= Non-attached members =

Members of the European Parliament not in a political group

Non-attached members, also known by the French term Non-Inscrits ([nɔn‿ɛ̃skʁi], NI), are members of the European Parliament (MEPs) who do not belong to one of the recognised political groups, which as of May 2025 consisted of eight groups ranging from far-left to far-right in their political positions.

These MEPs may be members of a national party, or of a European political party; however, for a political grouping to be formed in the European Parliament there need to be 23 MEPs from seven countries. Being part of a group grants access to state funds and committee seats, but the group members must be ideologically tied. Groups of convenience, such as the Technical Group of Independents, previously existed, but are no longer allowed, and the minimum requirements for group formation have been raised, forcing parties and MEPs without ideological similarity to already existing groupings to sit as non-inscrits. Whilst some groups of MEPs who sit as non-inscrits may share similar views and express an intention to form new groupings between themselves in the future, non-inscrits as a whole have no specific ties to each other, other than their mutual lack of a political grouping.

== MEPs ==
=== 10th European Parliament (2024–2029) ===
State	National party	European alliance	MEPs
Cyprus	Direct Democracy Cyprus; Άμεση Δημοκρατία Κύπρου	None	1 / 6
Czech Republic	Independent (elected with Enough!); Ondřej Dostál	Independent; ECPP individual member	1 / 21
France	Independent (elected with National Rally); Malika Sorel	Independent	1 / 81
Germany	Sahra Wagenknecht Alliance; Bündnis Sahra Wagenknecht	None	4 / 96
Germany	The PARTY; Die PARTEI	None	2 / 96
Germany	Independent (elected with Sahra Wagenknecht Alliance); Friedrich Pürner, Thomas Geisel	Independent	2 / 96
Greece	Communist Party of Greece; Κομμουνιστικό Κόμμα Ελλάδας	ECA	2 / 21
Greece	Victory; Νίκη	None	1 / 21
Greece	Course of Freedom; Πλεύση Ελευθερίας	None; PEL individual member	1 / 21
Luxembourg	Alternative Democratic Reform Party; Alternativ Demokratesch Reformpartei	ECR	1 / 6
Poland	Confederation of the Polish Crown; Konfederacja Korony Polskiej	None	1 / 53
Romania	Justice and Brotherhood; Dreptate și Frăție	None	1 / 33
Romania	S.O.S. Romania; S.O.S. România	None	1 / 33
Slovakia	Direction – Social Democracy; Smer – sociálna demokracia	None (Note: Ľuboš Blaha is also an individual member of PEL.)	5 / 15
Slovakia	Voice – Social Democracy; Hlas – sociálna demokracia	PES (associate; suspended); PEL individual member	1 / 15
Spain	The Party Is Over; Se Acabó La Fiesta (SALF)	None	1 / 61
Spain	Left Movement of Catalonia; Moviment d'Esquerres de Catalunya (MESCat)	None	1 / 61
European Union	Total		27 / 720

=== 9th European Parliament (2019–2024) ===
The majority of Non-attached members were right wing.

State	National party	European alliance	MEPs
Belgium	Independent; Marc Tarabella	Independent	1 / 21
Bulgaria	Independent; Elena Yoncheva	Independent	1 / 17
Croatia	Law and Justice; Pravo i Pravda	None	2 / 12
Czech Republic	Independent; Hynek Blaško	Independent	1 / 21
France	Independents; Gilbert Collard, Maxette Grisoni-Pirbakas, Hervé Juvin, Jérôme Rivière	Independent	4 / 79
Germany	Alternative for Germany; Alternative für Deutschland	None	9 / 96
Germany	The PARTY; Die PARTEI	None	1 / 96
Germany	Independents; Martin Buschmann, Jörg Meuthen	Independent	2 / 96
Greece	Communist Party of Greece; Κομμουνιστικό Κόμμα Ελλάδας (ΚΚΕ)	INITIATIVE	2 / 21
Greece	Independents; Alexis Georgoulis, Eva Kaili, Athanasios Konstantinou, Ioannis Lagos	Independent	4 / 21
Hungary	Fidesz – Hungarian Civic Alliance; Fidesz – Magyar Polgári Szövetség (Fidesz)	None	12 / 21
Hungary	Jobbik – Conservatives; Jobbik – Konzervatívok (Jobbik)	ECPM	1 / 21
Italy	Five Star Movement; Movimento 5 Stelle (M5S)	None	5 / 76
Italy	Christian Democracy Sicily; Democrazia Cristiana Sicilia (DCS)	None	1 / 76
Italy	Independents; Andrea Cozzolino, Dino Giarrusso, Maria Veronica Rossi, Massimiliano Smeriglio	Independent	4 / 76
Latvia	Latvian Russian Union; Latvijas Krievu savienība (LKS); Русский союз Латвии (РСЛ)	EFA (suspended)	1 / 8
Lithuania	Labour Party; Darbo Partija (DP)	None	1 / 11
Netherlands	Forum for Democracy; Forum voor Democratie (FvD)	None	1 / 29
Romania	Social Democratic Party; Partidul Social Democrat (PSD)	PES	1 / 33
Slovakia	Direction – Social Democracy; Smer – sociálna demokracia (SMER-SD)	PES (suspended)	2 / 14
Slovakia	Slovak PATRIOT; Slovenský PATRIOT (SP)	None	1 / 14
Slovakia	Republic Movement; Hnutie Republika	None	1 / 14
Spain	Together for Catalonia; Junts per Catalunya (Junts)	None	3 / 59
European Union	Total		61 / 705

Prior to the United Kingdom's withdrawal from the EU on 31 January 2020, there were 30 British MEPs who were Non-Inscrits: 29 members of the Brexit Party and 1 member of the Democratic Unionist Party.

=== 8th European Parliament (2014–2019) ===
The number of Non-Inscrits rose temporarily from 48 at the beginning of the term to 100 between 16 and 20 October 2014 when the EFDD group dissolved following the departure of Latvian MEP Iveta Grigule. The EFDD group was restored when Robert Iwaszkiewicz (KNP, Poland) decided to join it.

On 15 June 2015, 35 Non-Inscrits MEPs and a former EFDD member (Janice Atkinson, excluded from UKIP) formed a new group, named "Europe of Nations and Freedom" (ENF), around Marine Le Pen (FN) and Marcel de Graaff (PVV), later joined on 24 June 2015 by Aymeric Chauprade. The number of Non-Inscrits then fell to 14 on 22 July 2015, when Juan Fernando López Aguilar reintegrated S&D. Aymeric Chauprade left ENF on 9 November 2015. Marcus Pretzell was expelled from ECR before joining the ENF in May 2016, bringing the number of Non-Inscrits to 15. From May 2016 to May 2017 Renato Soru was expelled from S&D after being sentenced for tax evasion. When Steven Woolfe and Diane James left EFDD in October and November 2016 and Alessandra Mussolini left EPP during twelve days in November–December 2016 the number of Non-Inscrits grew to 19 before coming back to 18. Jacek Saryusz-Wolski was expelled from the EPP in March 2017.

The majority of Non-attached members were right wing.

Country	#	National party	MEP	European alliance
Denmark	1	Independent (elected with DF)	Rikke Karlsson (was member of ECR until 21 February 2018)	None
France	1	National Rally (RN); Rassemblement National	Bruno Gollnisch	EAF / MENF
France	1	Comités Jeanne (elected with RN)	Jean-Marie Le Pen	APF
France	1	Independent (elected with RN)	Sophie Montel (was member of EFDD until 5 July 2018)	None
Germany
Germany	1	Die PARTEI	Martin Sonneborn	None
Germany	1	National Democratic Party of Germany (NPD); Nationaldemokratische Partei Deutschlands	Udo Voigt	APF
Greece	2	Golden Dawn; Χρυσή Αυγή (ΧΑ); Chrysí Avgí	Georgios Epitidios	APF
Greece	2	Golden Dawn; Χρυσή Αυγή (ΧΑ); Chrysí Avgí	Lambros Foundoulis	APF
Greece	1	Patriotic Radical Union (elected with ΧΑ); Πατριωτική Ριζοσπαστική Ένωση (ΠΑΤ.ΡΙ.Ε.); Patriotikí Rizospastikí Énosi	Eleftherios Synadinos	None
Greece	2	Communist Party of Greece; Κομμουνιστικό Κόμμα Ελλάδας (ΚΚΕ); Kommounistikó Kómma Elládas	Konstantinos Papadakis	INITIATIVE
Greece	2	Communist Party of Greece; Κομμουνιστικό Κόμμα Ελλάδας (ΚΚΕ); Kommounistikó Kómma Elládas	Sotirios Zarianopoulos	INITIATIVE
Hungary	1	Jobbik; Jobbik Magyarországért Mozgalom	Zoltán Balczó	None
Hungary	2	Independent (elected with Jobbik)	Béla Kovács	None
Hungary	2	Independent (elected with Jobbik)	Krisztina Morvai	None
Poland	1	Liberty; Wolność	Dobromir Sośnierz (left KNP and joined KORWiN, replacing Janusz Korwin-Mikke upon his resignation)	None
Poland	1	Civic Platform (PO); Platforma Obywatelska	Jacek Saryusz-Wolski (expelled from EPP in March 2017)	EPP
Poland	1	Independent (elected with PiS)	Kazimierz Michał Ujazdowski (was member of ECR until 13 April 2018)	None
United Kingdom	1	Democratic Unionist Party (DUP)	Diane Dodds	None
United Kingdom	2	Independent (elected with UKIP)	James Carver (was member of EFDD until 28 May 2018)	None
United Kingdom	2	Independent (elected with UKIP)	Steven Woolfe (was member of EFDD until 23 October 2016)	None

==== Previous members ====
Country	#	National party	MEP	European alliance
Austria	4	Freedom Party of Austria (FPÖ); Freiheitliche Partei Österreichs	Barbara Kappel (Note: Until 14 June 2015, then joined ENF)	EAF / MENL
Austria	4	Freedom Party of Austria (FPÖ); Freiheitliche Partei Österreichs	Georg Mayer	EAF / MENL
Austria	4	Freedom Party of Austria (FPÖ); Freiheitliche Partei Österreichs	Franz Obermayr	EAF / MENL
Austria	4	Freedom Party of Austria (FPÖ); Freiheitliche Partei Österreichs	Harald Vilimsky	EAF / MENL
Belgium	1	Flemish Interest (VB); Vlaams Belang	Gerolf Annemans	EAF / MENL
France	18	National Front (FN); Front National	Louis Aliot	EAF / MENL
France	18	National Front (FN); Front National	Marie-Christine Arnautu	EAF / MENL
France	18	National Front (FN); Front National	Nicolas Bay	EAF / MENL
France	18	National Front (FN); Front National	Dominique Bilde	EAF / MENL
France	18	National Front (FN); Front National	Marie-Christine Boutonnet	EAF / MENL
France	18	National Front (FN); Front National	Steeve Briois	EAF / MENL
France	18	National Front (FN); Front National	Mireille d'Ornano	EAF / MENL
France	18	National Front (FN); Front National	Édouard Ferrand	EAF / MENL
France	18	National Front (FN); Front National	Sylvie Goddyn	EAF / MENL
France	18	National Front (FN); Front National	Jean-François Jalkh	EAF / MENL
France	18	National Front (FN); Front National	Marine Le Pen	EAF / MENL
France	18	National Front (FN); Front National	Philippe Loiseau (Replaced Jeanne Pothain, who resigned before sitting)	EAF / MENL
France	18	National Front (FN); Front National	Dominique Martin	EAF / MENL
France	18	National Front (FN); Front National	Joëlle Mélin	EAF / MENL
France	18	National Front (FN); Front National	Bernard Monot	EAF / MENL
France	18	National Front (FN); Front National	Sophie Montel	EAF / MENL
France	18	National Front (FN); Front National	Florian Philippot	EAF / MENL
France	18	National Front (FN); Front National	Mylène Troszczynski	EAF / MENL
France	2	Rassemblement bleu Marine (RBM); Front National	Gilles Lebreton	EAF / MENL
France	2	Rassemblement bleu Marine (RBM); Front National	Jean-Luc Schaffhauser	EAF / MENL
France	1	Independent (elected with FN)	Aymeric Chauprade (from 9 November 2015 to 18 April 2018; was member of ENF from 24 June to 9 November 2015)	none
Germany	1	Alternative for Germany (AfD); Alternative für Deutschland	Marcus Pretzell (from 12 April 2016 to 1 May 2016)	none
Italy	1	Democratic Party	Renato Soru (was member of S&D until 9 May 2016 and from 16 May 2017)	Party of European Socialists
Italy	5	Northern League (LN); Lega Nord	Mara Bizzotto	EAF / MENL
Italy	5	Northern League (LN); Lega Nord	Mario Borghezio	EAF / MENL
Italy	5	Northern League (LN); Lega Nord	Gianluca Buonanno	EAF / MENL
Italy	5	Northern League (LN); Lega Nord	Lorenzo Fontana (Replaced on 11 July 2014 Flavio Tosi, who resigned to remain mayor of Verona)	EAF / MENL
Italy	5	Northern League (LN); Lega Nord	Matteo Salvini	EAF / MENL
Italy	1	Forza Italia	Alessandra Mussolini (was member of EPP Group until 29 November 2016 and after 11 December 2016)	European People's Party
Italy	1	Independent (elected with M5S)	David Borrelli (was member of EFDD until 13 February 2018 and member of ALDE from 18 April 2019)	None
Latvia	1	Latvian Farmers' Union (ZZS); Zaļo un Zemnieku savienība	Iveta Grigule (from 16 October 2014 to 27 April 2015)	None
Netherlands	4	Party for Freedom (PVV); Partij voor de Vrijheid	Marcel de Graaff	EAF
Netherlands	4	Party for Freedom (PVV); Partij voor de Vrijheid	Vicky Maeijer	EAF
Netherlands	4	Party for Freedom (PVV); Partij voor de Vrijheid	Olaf Stuger	EAF
Netherlands	4	Party for Freedom (PVV); Partij voor de Vrijheid	Auke Zijlstra (from 1 to 7 September 2015, then joined ENF. He replaced Hans Jansen who died on 5 May 2015, himself replacing Geert Wilders, who resigned before sitting)	EAF
Poland	3	Congress of the New Right (KNP); Kongres Nowej Prawicy	Robert Iwaszkiewicz (until 20 October 2014, before joining EFDD)	None
Poland	3	Congress of the New Right (KNP); Kongres Nowej Prawicy	Michał Marusik	None
Poland	3	Congress of the New Right (KNP); Kongres Nowej Prawicy	Stanisław Żółtek	None
Poland	1	Liberty; Wolność	Janusz Korwin-Mikke (left KNP and founded own party KORWiN in March 2015)	None
Romania	1	Independent	Sorin Moisă	None
Spain	1	Spanish Socialist Workers' Party (PSOE); Partido Socialista Obrero Español	Juan Fernando López Aguilar (suspended from S&D from 15 April to 21 July 2015 following allegations of domestic violence)	PES
United Kingdom	1	Independent (elected with UKIP)	Diane James (was member of EFDD until 19 November 2016 and from 17 December 2018)	None
United Kingdom	1	UK Independence Party (UKIP)	Gerard Batten (was member of EFDD until 7 December 2018 and member of ENF from 15 January 2019)	None

=== 7th European Parliament (2009–2014) ===
The majority of Non-attached members were right wing.

Country	#	National party	MEP	European alliance
Austria	1	Hans-Peter Martin's List	Hans-Peter Martin	None
Austria	2	formerly Hans-Peter Martin's List	Martin Ehrenhauser	None
Austria	2	formerly Hans-Peter Martin's List	Angelika Werthmann	None
Austria	2	Freedom Party	Andreas Mölzer	None
Austria	2	Freedom Party	Franz Obermayr	None
Austria	1	Alliance for the Future of Austria	Ewald Stadler	None
Belgium	1	Flemish Interest	Philip Claeys	None
Bulgaria	2	Attack	Dimitar Stoyanov	None
Bulgaria	2	Attack	Slavcho Binev (joined EFD in 2012, while leaving Attack and founding PROUD)	None
France	3	Front National	Bruno Gollnisch	AENM
France	3	Front National	Jean-Marie Le Pen	None
France	3	Front National	Marine Le Pen	None
Hungary	3	Jobbik	Béla Kovács	None
Hungary	3	Jobbik	Krisztina Morvai	None
Hungary	3	Jobbik	Csanád Szegedi	None
Italy	1	Northern League	Mario Borghezio	MELD?
Ireland	1	formerly Labour	Nessa Childers	None
Netherlands	3	Party for Freedom	Lucas Hartong	None
Netherlands	3	Party for Freedom	Auke Zijlstra	None
Netherlands	3	Party for Freedom	Patricia van der Kammen	None
Netherlands	1	Article 50 (formerly Party for Freedom)	Daniël van der Stoep	None
Netherlands	1	(formerly Party for Freedom)	Laurence Stassen	None
Romania	2	Greater Romania Party	Claudiu Ciprian Tănăsescu	None
Romania	2	Greater Romania Party	Corneliu Vadim Tudor	None
Romania	1	New Generation Party – Christian Democratic	George Becali	None
Spain	1	Union, Progress and Democracy	Francisco Sosa Wagner	None
United Kingdom	2	British National Party	Nick Griffin	AENM
United Kingdom	2	British National Party (until 17 October 2010); British Democratic Party (from 9 February 2013)	Andrew Brons	None
United Kingdom	1	Democratic Unionist Party	Diane Dodds	None
United Kingdom	3	UK Independence Party (UKIP)	Trevor Colman (left EFD on 25 March 2011)	None
United Kingdom	3	UK Independence Party (before 4 November 2013); An Independence Party (2013–14); An Independence from Europe (from 25 March 2014)	Mike Nattrass (left EFD on 23 June 2010, rejoined EFD on 11 December 2012, left EFD again on 9 September 2013)	None
United Kingdom	3	UK Independence Party (before 16 February 2011); United Kingdom Independent (2011–12); We Demand a Referendum (from 13 September 2012)	Nikki Sinclaire (left EFD on 18 January 2010)	None

=== 6th European Parliament (2004-2009) ===
In the 6th European Parliament 23 right-wing NIs briefly formed the Identity, Tradition, Sovereignty group at the start of 2007, but it collapsed on 14 November 2007 due to internal disagreements.

The majority of Non-attached members were right wing.

Country	#		National party	MEP	European alliance
Austria	2	1	Hans-Peter Martin's List (Liste Dr. Hans-Peter Martin)	Hans-Peter Martin	None
Austria	2	1	Freedom Party	Andreas Mölzer	None
Belgium	3		Flemish Interest	Philip Claeys	None
Belgium	3		Flemish Interest	Koenraad Dillen	None
Belgium	3		Flemish Interest	Frank Vanhecke	None
Bulgaria	3		National Union Attack		None
Bulgaria	3		National Union Attack	Dimitar Stoyanov	None
Bulgaria	3		National Union Attack	Slavcho Binev	None
Bulgaria	3		National Union Attack	Desislav Chukolov	None
Czech Republic	1		Independent Democrats (Nezávislí demokraté)	Jana Bobošíková	
France	7		National Front	Bruno Gollnisch	Euronat
France	7		National Front	Carl Lang	Euronat
France	7		National Front	Jean-Marie Le Pen	Euronat
France	7		National Front	Marine Le Pen	Euronat
France	7		National Front	Fernand Le Rachinel	Euronat
France	7		National Front	Jean-Claude Martinez	Euronat
France	7		National Front	Lydia Schenardi	Euronat
Italy	3	1	Olive Tree (Uniti nell'Ulivo)	Gianni Rivera	None
Italy	3	1	Social Alternative	Roberto Fiore	None
Italy	3	1	Tricolour Flame	Luca Romagnoli	Euronat
Poland	2		League of Polish Families (Liga Polskich Rodzin)	Sylwester Chruszcz	None
Poland	2		League of Polish Families (Liga Polskich Rodzin)	Maciej Giertych	None
Slovakia	3		People's Party – Movement for a Democratic Slovakia (Ľudová strana – Hnutie za demokratické Slovensko)	Peter Baco	None
Slovakia	3		People's Party – Movement for a Democratic Slovakia (Ľudová strana – Hnutie za demokratické Slovensko)	Irena Belohorská	None
Slovakia	3		People's Party – Movement for a Democratic Slovakia (Ľudová strana – Hnutie za demokratické Slovensko)	Sergej Kozlík	None
United Kingdom	4	1	Traditional Unionist Voice	Jim Allister	ADIE
United Kingdom	4	1	formerly UKIP	Ashley Mote	None
United Kingdom	4	1	formerly UKIP	Robert Kilroy-Silk	None
United Kingdom	4	1	formerly UKIP	Tom Wise	None

=== 5th European Parliament (1999–2004) ===
The majority of Non-attached members were right wing.

Country	#	National party	MEP	European alliance
Austria	5	Freedom Party	Gerhard Hager	None
Austria	5	Freedom Party	Wolfgang Ilgenfritz	None
Austria	5	Freedom Party	Hans Kronberger	None
Austria	5	Freedom Party	Daniela Raschhofer	None
Austria	5	Freedom Party	Peter Sichrovsky	None
Belgium	2	Vlaams Blok	Philip Claeys	None
Belgium	2	Vlaams Blok	Koenraad Dillen	None
Belgium	1	Independent	Ward Beysen	None
Denmark	3	June Movement	Bent Andersen	None
Denmark	3	June Movement	Jens-Peter Bonde	None
Denmark	3	June Movement	Ulla Sandbæk	None
France	5	National Front	Charles de Gaulle	Euronat
France	5	National Front	Bruno Gollnisch	Euronat
France	5	National Front	Carl Lang	Euronat
France	5	National Front	Jean-Claude Martinez	Euronat
France	5	National Front	Marie-France Stirbois	Euronat
France	5	Individual members of Rally for France	Elizabeth Montfort	
France	5	Individual members of Rally for France	Thierry de la Perrière	
France	5	Individual members of Rally for France	Dominique Souchet	
France	5	Individual members of Rally for France	Nicole Thomas-Mauro	
France	5	Individual members of Rally for France	Alexandre Varaut	
Italy	7	Italian Radicals	Emma Bonino	ELDR
Italy	7	Italian Radicals	Marco Cappato	ELDR
Italy	7	Italian Radicals	Gianfranco Dell'Alba	ELDR
Italy	7	Italian Radicals	Benedetto Della Vedova	ELDR
Italy	7	Italian Radicals	Olivier Dupuis	ELDR
Italy	7	Italian Radicals	Marco Pannella	ELDR
Italy	7	Italian Radicals	Maurizio Turco	ELDR
Italy	4	Lega Nord	Mario Borghezio	None
Italy	4	Lega Nord	Marco Formentini	None
Italy	4	Lega Nord	Gian Paolo Gobbo	None
Italy	4	Lega Nord	Francesco Speroni	None
Italy	1	Tricolour Flame	Roberto Felice Bigliardo	None
Spain	1	Batasuna	Koldo Gorostiaga Atxalandabaso	None
United Kingdom	1	Democratic Unionist Party	Ian Paisley	None

=== 4th European Parliament (1994–1999) ===
The British Democratic Unionist Party was the only Non-attached.

Country	#	National party	MEP	European alliance
United Kingdom	1	Democratic Unionist Party	Ian Paisley	none

=== 3rd European Parliament (1989–1994) ===
The Dutch Reformed Political Party was the only Non-attached.

Country	#	National party	MEP	European alliance
Netherlands	1	Reformed Political Party	Leen van der Waal	none

=== 2nd European Parliament (1984–1989) ===
The Dutch Reformed Political Party was the only Non-attached.

Country	#	National party	MEP	European alliance
Netherlands	1	Reformed Political Party	Leen van der Waal	none

=== 1st European Parliament (1979–1984) ===
The Dutch Democrats 66 was the only Non-attached.

Country	#	National party	MEP	European alliance
Netherlands	2	Democrats 66	Suzanne Dekker	none
Netherlands	2	Democrats 66	Aar de Goede	none

== See also ==
- Independent politician
- Mixed Group
