= Members of the European Parliament (2014–2019) =

This is a list giving breakdowns of the members serving in the European Parliament session from 2014 to 2019, following the 2014 election. For a full single list, see: List of members of the European Parliament 2014–2019.

== MEPs ==
- List of members of the European Parliament for Austria, 2014–2019
- List of members of the European Parliament for Belgium, 2014–2019
- List of members of the European Parliament for Bulgaria, 2014–2019
- List of members of the European Parliament for Croatia, 2014–2019
- List of members of the European Parliament for Cyprus, 2014–2019
- List of members of the European Parliament for the Czech Republic, 2014–2019
- List of members of the European Parliament for Denmark, 2014–2019
- List of members of the European Parliament for Estonia, 2014–2019
- List of members of the European Parliament for Finland, 2014–2019
- List of members of the European Parliament for France, 2014–2019
- List of members of the European Parliament for Germany, 2014–2019
- List of members of the European Parliament for Greece, 2014–2019
- List of members of the European Parliament for Hungary, 2014–2019
- List of members of the European Parliament for Ireland, 2014–2019
- List of members of the European Parliament for Italy, 2014–2019
- List of members of the European Parliament for Latvia, 2014–2019
- List of members of the European Parliament for Lithuania, 2014–2019
- List of members of the European Parliament for Luxembourg, 2014–2019
- List of members of the European Parliament for Malta, 2014–2019
- List of members of the European Parliament for the Netherlands, 2014–2019
- List of members of the European Parliament for Poland, 2014–2019
- List of members of the European Parliament for Portugal, 2014–2019
- List of members of the European Parliament for Romania, 2014–2019
- List of members of the European Parliament for Slovakia, 2014–2019
- List of members of the European Parliament for Slovenia, 2014–2019
- List of members of the European Parliament for Spain, 2014–2019
- List of members of the European Parliament for Sweden, 2014–2019
- List of members of the European Parliament for the United Kingdom, 2014–2019 (including Gibraltar)
