= Gianluca Buonanno =

Italian politician (1966–2016)

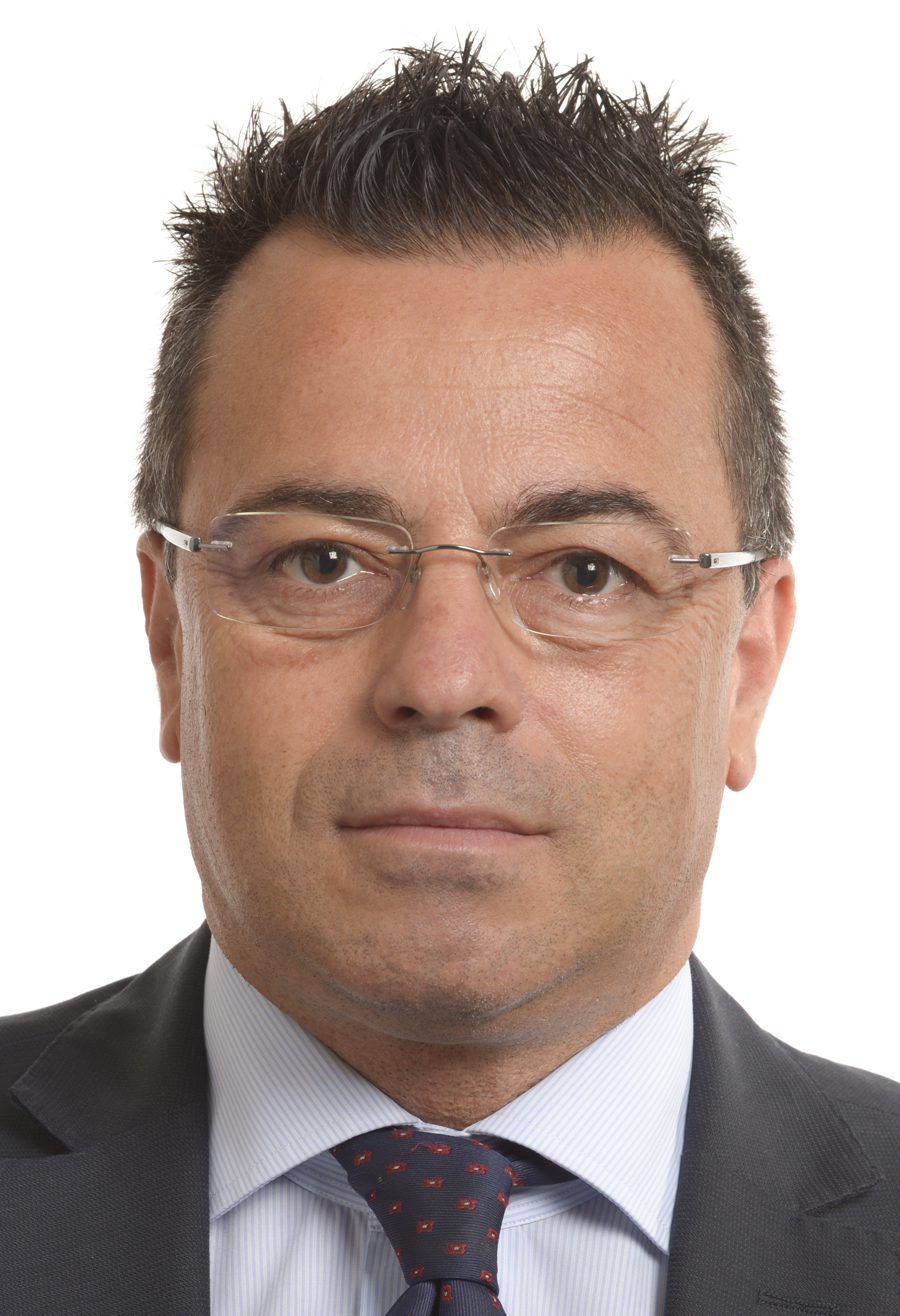

Mayor of Borgosesia
- In office 25 May 2014 – 5 June 2016
- Preceded by: Alice Freschi
- Succeeded by: Alice Freschi

Member of the European Parliament for North-West Italy
- In office 25 June 2014 – 5 June 2016

Member of the Chamber of Deputies
- Incumbent
- Assumed office 29 April 2008

Personal details
- Born: 15 May 1966 Borgosesia, Italy
- Died: 5 June 2016 (aged 50) Gorla Maggiore, Italy
- Party: LN (2002–2016)
- Other political affiliations: AN (1995–2002); MSI (1982–1995)
- Children: 2
- Profession: Politician

Gianluca Buonanno (15 May 1966 – 5 June 2016) was an Italian far-right politician. At the time of his death, Buonanno was mayor of Borgosesia and member of the European Parliament (MEP) for Lega Nord. During his career, Buonanno generated controversy and public uproar.

== Biography ==
Buonanno was born Borgosesia, province of Vercelli, in the Piedmont region. He was affiliated with the Italian Social Movement (MSI) from 1982 to 1995, when he switched to the MSI's legal successor National Alliance (AN). Buonanno left AN for Lega Nord in 2002. He was elected in the XVI and XVII legislature of Italy and in the 2014 European Parliament election for the eighth European Parliament. As an MEP, Buonanno was an unaffiliated Non-Inscrit before joining Europe of Nations and Freedom, and was backed by the European Alliance for Freedom and Movement for a Europe of Nations and Freedom. Buonanno died at the age of 50 in 2016 in a car accident in Gorla Maggiore, province of Varese. His funeral was held in the parish church of Serravalle Sesia, where Lega Nord leader Matteo Salvini was also present.

== Political views and controversies ==
Buonanno was known for having shown attitudes typical of Italian far-right politics and generating controversy and public uproar. Multiple times he expressed opinions, judged to be homophobic, on homosexuality. In 2011, Buonanno said: "Gays, everything is due to them. When a homosexual happens to be beaten up, a great outcry comes out, but nobody says anything when who is beaten up is not gay." In 2013, he stated: "At Gay Pride you can see scenes that are disgusting, horrifying scenes. [Gay] Pride sucks. If a gay person approaches me, does some flirting and he pisses me off, I kick him in the balls."

In April 2014, Buonanno had waved a sea bass in the Italian Parliament arguing that, unlike immigrants who he claimed were kept in luxury hotels, pensioners cannot afford it, and invited the then Chambers of Deputies president Laura Boldrini to eat it. In September 2014, Buonanno declared: "In Borgosesia there may be a dozen of gay people, but they may have increased. I would prefer to register and identify them all. If they ask me to celebrate a gay wedding in the town where I'm mayor, I'd say it's better for them to get an involuntary treatment. At most I would offer to gays bananas or fennel salad." (Note: "Fennel" (in Italian: finocchio, plural finocchi) designates a well-known Italian term usage to refer a male homosexual, in an offensive and homophobic way, similar as faggot in English.)

In 2015, Buonanno sided against the Romani people, saying: "Romanis are the scum of society." Because of this, in April 2016 the Court of Milan upheld an appeal filed by the Association for Juridical Studies on Immigration (ASGI) and NAGA (Voluntary Association of Social-Health Assistance and for the Rights of Foreign Citizens, Romani and Sinti) associations and sentenced Buonanno to the payment of €6,000 in favour of each of the recurring associations as compensation for non-pecuniary damage.
