= European Alliance for Freedom =

Former Right-wing European political party

- President: Franz Obermayr
- Vice President: Philip Claeys; Marine Le Pen
- Secretary General: Sharon Ellul-Bonici
- Founded: 2010
- Dissolved: 2016
- Succeeded by: MENF (majority)
- Headquarters: Birkirkara, Malta
- Think tank: European Foundation for Freedom
- Youth wing: Young European Alliance for Hope (YEAH)
- Ideology: Right-wing populism Euroscepticism; Nationalism
- Political position: Right-wing to far-right
- European Parliament group: Europe of Nations and Freedom
- International affiliation: None
- Colours: Blue

Website
- www.eurallfree.org

The European Alliance for Freedom (EAF) was a right-wing to far-right Eurosceptic European political party founded in 2010 and recognised by the European Parliament in 2011. In 2016, it did not seek registration as a European party with the new Authority for European Political Parties and European Political Foundations and was dissolved.

Unlike in most European parties, the members of the Alliance were not national parties but individuals. The head office of the Alliance was in Brussels, Belgium, and its registered office was in Birkirkara, Malta. Franz Obermayr, from Austria, was the president of the organisation starting in November 2012, succeeding founding chairman Godfrey Bloom from the United Kingdom. His vice-presidents were the Belgian Philip Claeys and the French Marine Le Pen. The secretary-general was Sharon Ellul-Bonici from Malta.

The EAF was awarded a grant by European Parliament for 2011 of, at most, €372,753. In 2012, the EP's maximal grant dropped to €360,455. The party's affiliated European political foundation was the European Foundation for Freedom.

== 2014 European Parliament election ==
Ahead of the 2014 European Parliament election, it was suggested that EAF members might form a parliamentary group of their own after the elections. The group was reported to have the support of the French National Front (FN), the Dutch Party for Freedom (PVV), the Flemish Vlaams Belang (VB), the Freedom Party of Austria (FPÖ), the Sweden Democrats (SD), the Slovak National Party and the Italian Northern League (LN). The Danish People's Party, UK Independence Party (UKIP) and the Alternative for Germany refused to join the new alliance, while the more radical and anti-Semitic European nationalist parties such as National Democratic Party of Germany, the British National Party, Greek Golden Dawn and Hungarian Jobbik were not permitted to. Some media reports referred to the proposed group as the "Le Pen–Wilders alliance". In the election, the French FN performed very strongly, winning 24 seats, while the Slovak National Party failed to win a seat and the Sweden Democrats abstained from the alliance (instead joining Europe of Freedom and Democracy), leaving the FN, PVV, LN, FPÖ and VB as the only EAF member parties.

On 28 May, three days after the end of the elections, Le Pen, Wilders, Matteo Salvini (LN), Harald Vilimsky (FPÖ) and Gerolf Annemans (VB) appeared at a press conference in Brussels, claiming to be confident to find enough allies for forming a new group soon. News media reported about a competition between the proposed EAF group led by Le Pen and the existing Europe of Freedom and Democracy (EFD) group led by Nigel Farage of UKIP, both trying to win over support from newly represented Eurosceptic, right-wing and populist parties from different countries. While the FN and Wilders preferred to form one large group, including UKIP, the British Eurosceptics decidedly rejected the idea, branding Le Pen's party as too extreme. Eventually, with MEPs from only five different member states, the proposed EAF group fell short of the parliament's requirement of seven member states to be represented in each group. Instead, their MEPs have continued to sit as Non-Inscrits.

== Structure ==
=== President ===
- 2010–2012 – Godfrey Bloom (UK)
- 2012–present – Franz Obermayr (Austria)

=== Vice president ===
- 2010–present – Philip Claeys (Belgium); Marine Le Pen (France)

=== Secretary General ===
- 2010–present – Sharon Ellul-Bonici (Malta)

== Former members ==
=== Former members of the European Parliament ===
- Austria – Georg Mayer (FPÖ)^{3},
- Austria – Andreas Mölzer (FPÖ),
- Austria – Harald Vilimsky, (FPÖ)
- Belgium – Gerolf Annemans (MEP) (Vlaams Belang)
- Bulgaria – Dimitar Stoyanov (MEP, NDP, formerly Attack)
- France – Jean-Marie Le Pen (National Front)
- France – Marine Le Pen (National Front)^{3}
- Poland – Janusz Korwin-Mikke (MEP)
- Poland – Robert Jarosław Iwaszkiewicz (MEP)
- Poland – Michał Marusik (MEP)
- Poland – Stanisław Żółtek (MEP)
- United Kingdom – Godfrey Bloom (MEP, Independent, formerly UKIP)
- United Kingdom – Jane Collins (MEP, UKIP)
- United Kingdom – Mike Hookem (MEP, UKIP)

=== Former board members and other members ===
- Czech Republic – Martin Lank (Dawn – National Coalition)
- Germany – Torsten Groß (Citizens in Rage)
- Germany – Jan Timke (Citizens in Rage)
- Hungary – Krisztina Morvai (Independent, associated with Jobbik)
- Latvia – Serzants Karlis (Union of Greens and Farmers, Member of Saeima)
- Lithuania – Rolandas Paksas, Juozas Imbrasas (Order and Justice)^{2}
- Malta – Anthony Agius Decelis (Labour Party)
- Malta – Sharon Ellul-Bonici
- Poland – Przemysław Wipler
- Sweden – Kent Ekeroth (Sweden Democrats)

^{1} Morvai is associated with Jobbik while not being a formal member. She quit in July 2011, citing differences with the FPÖ.
^{2} Paksas and Imbrasas later joined the Movement for a Europe of Liberties and Democracy (MELD)
^{3} Left to form Movement for a Europe of Nations and Freedom (MENL)

== See also ==
- European political party
- Authority for European Political Parties and European Political Foundations
- European political foundation
