= List of members of the European Parliament for the Netherlands, 2014–2019 =

Below is a list of the 26 members of the European Parliament for the Netherlands in the 2014 to 2019 session.

== List ==
Name	National party	EP Group (Note: Short periods as Non-Inscrits at the start of a term are excluded)	Start date	End date	Ref.
Hans van Baalen	VVD	ALDE	1 July 2014	2 July 2019	
Bas Belder	SGP	ECR	1 July 2014	2 July 2019	
Wim van de Camp	CDA	EPP	1 July 2014	2 July 2019	
Peter van Dalen	CU	ECR	1 July 2014	2 July 2019	
Bas Eickhout	GL	G–EFA	1 July 2014	2 July 2019	
André Elissen	PVV	ENF	13 June 2017	2 July 2019	
Gerben-Jan Gerbrandy	D66	ALDE	1 July 2014	2 July 2019	
Marcel de Graaff	PVV	NI	1 July 2014	2 July 2019	
Marcel de Graaff	PVV	ENF	1 July 2014	2 July 2019	
Anja Hazekamp	PvdD	EUL–NGL	1 July 2014	2 July 2019	
Jan Huitema	VVD	ALDE	1 July 2014	2 July 2019	
Hans Jansen	PVV	NI	1 July 2014	5 May 2015	
Hans Jansen	PVV	ENF	1 July 2014	5 May 2015	
Dennis de Jong	SP	EUL–NGL	1 July 2014	2 July 2019	
Agnes Jongerius	PvdA	S&D	1 July 2014	2 July 2019	
Esther de Lange	CDA	EPP	1 July 2014	2 July 2019	
Jeroen Lenaers	CDA	EPP	1 July 2014	2 July 2019	
Vicky Maeijer	PVV	NI	1 July 2014	15 March 2017	
Vicky Maeijer	PVV	ENF	1 July 2014	15 March 2017	
Matthijs van Miltenburg	D66	ALDE	1 July 2014	2 July 2019	
Anne-Marie Mineur	SP	EUL–NGL	1 July 2014	2 July 2019	
Caroline Nagtegaal-van Doorn	VVD	ALDE	14 November 2017	2 July 2019	
Cora van Nieuwenhuizen	VVD	ALDE	1 July 2014	25 October 2017	
Lambert van Nistelrooij	CDA	EPP	1 July 2014	2 July 2019	
Kati Piri	PvdA	S&D	1 July 2014	2 July 2019	
Judith Sargentini	GL	G–EFA	1 July 2014	2 July 2019	
Marietje Schaake	D66	ALDE	1 July 2014	2 July 2019	
Annie Schreijer-Pierik	CDA	EPP	1 July 2014	2 July 2019	
Olaf Stuger	PVV	NI	1 July 2014	2 July 2019	
Olaf Stuger	PVV	ENF	1 July 2014	2 July 2019	
Paul Tang	PvdA	S&D	1 July 2014	2 July 2019	
Sophie in 't Veld	D66	ALDE	1 July 2014	2 July 2019	
Auke Zijlstra	PVV	NI	7 September 2015	2 July 2019	
Auke Zijlstra	PVV	ENF	7 September 2015	2 July 2019	

== See also ==
- 2014 European Parliament election
- 2014 European Parliament election in the Netherlands
- List of members of the European Parliament, 2014–2019
