= Europe of Nations and Freedom =

Former far-right political group of the European Parliament

- European Parliament group
- English abbr.: ENF
- French abbr.: ENL
- Ideology: Nationalism; Right-wing populism; Anti-immigration; Euroscepticism
- Political position: Right-wing to far-right
- European parties: Movement for a Europe of Nations and Freedom
- From: 15 June 2015
- To: 13 June 2019
- Succeeded by: Identity and Democracy
- Chaired by: Nicolas Bay; Marcel de Graaff
- Website: enf.eu (archived)

Europe of Nations and Freedom (ENF; French: Europe des nations et des libertés, ENL) was a far-right political group that operated in the European Parliament between 2015 and 2019. It was composed of 37 MEPs and only existed during the European Parliament's 8th term. Most of its MPs were members of the Movement for a Europe of Nations and Freedom political party.

Ideologically, ENF was right-wing populist and Eurosceptic. Its members included far-right parties such as French National Front (known as National Rally after 2018), Italian Lega Nord, Dutch Party for Freedom, and Vlaams Belang. After the 2019 European Parliament election, ENF was transformed into the Identity and Democracy group.

== History ==
Following the 2014 European elections on 22–25 May 2014, the European Alliance for Freedom (EAF), comprising far-right parties from across Europe, aimed to form a stable parliamentary group in the European Parliament prior to the start of the 8th term. A previous attempt to create a far-right group in the European Parliament during the 6th term was the short-lived Identity, Tradition, Sovereignty (ITS) group in 2007.

On 28 May 2014, it was announced at a press conference in Brussels that the alliance led by Marine Le Pen of the French National Front (FN) and Geert Wilders of the Dutch Party for Freedom (PVV), including Northern League (LN) leader Matteo Salvini, were in negotiations to create a parliamentary group. On 24 June 2014, it was announced that the Le Pen/Wilders alliance had failed to gather the requisite 25 MEPs from seven EU member nations, thus starting the parliamentary term as Non-Inscrits members. Later in 2014, the EAF was succeeded by the Movement for a Europe of Nations and Freedom (MENL), without the participation of the PVV.

On 15 June 2015, Marine Le Pen announced that a new group in the European Parliament would be launched the following day, set to comprise MEPs from the FN, PVV, LN, the Freedom Party of Austria (FPÖ), Flemish Interest (VB), the Polish Congress of the New Right (KNP) and former UK Independence Party member Janice Atkinson. Together with the availability of the excluded UKIP MEP, the creation of the group with representation from seven member states was made possible by the recent side-lining of two historical but controversial figures of the far-right: Jean-Marie Le Pen was suspended by his own National Front, while Janusz Korwin-Mikke's departure from the KNP allowed Marine Le Pen and Wilders to accept the two remaining members of the party in their group, something they had rejected during the discussions held in June 2014. Among the FN delegation, Bruno Gollnisch chose not to join in solidarity with former president Jean-Marie Le Pen, while Aymeric Chauprade, on a trip to Fiji, joined a few days later. One of the four seats won by the PVV was vacant at the time of the group's creation until 8 September 2015, when Auke Zijlstra replaced Hans Jansen, who had died on 5 May 2015.

In July 2015, the European Parliament decided the group would earn €3 million per year from EU funds. By adding up all the grants for the group as well as for the linked political party and think tank, the funds will amount to €17.5 million for the next four years of their mandate. Reviewing votes in the EU Parliament on resolutions critical of Russia or measures not in the Kremlin's interests (e.g., the Ukraine-EU Association Agreement), Hungary's Political Capital Institute found that future members of the ENF voted "no" in 93% of cases. The first convention of the ENL took place on 28 and 29 January 2016 in Milan with all the leaders of ENL's member parties along with Freedom and Direct Democracy (SPD) leader Tomio Okamura, whose party was not a member of the ENL as it had no MEPs. During this convention, each leader made a speech followed by a press conference the next day. During the Alternative for Germany (AfD) party convention on 30 April 2016, it was announced that Marcus Pretzell MEP would join the ENL group. The AfD's other MEP Beatrix von Storch joined the Europe of Freedom and Direct Democracy (EFDD) group in March 2016, both MEPs having been expelled from the ECR group.

On 15 July 2015, Romanian MEP Laurențiu Rebega left both the Conservative Party and the S&D group to join the ENF. On 9 November 2015 Aymeric Chauprade left the group. On 2 October 2017, 3 MEPs left the Front National and joined the EFDD group two days later. On 2 March 2018, Romanian MEP Laurențiu Rebega left the group. In May 2018, another MEP, Bernard Monot, left the Front National to join the EFDD group. In January 2019, three UK Independence Party MEPs joined the group. In April 2019, one of those MEPs, Jane Collins, returned to the EFDD group.

On 12 June 2019, following the 2019 European Parliament elections, the successor group to ENF was announced as Identity and Democracy group, to be launched the following day.

== Member parties before being dissolved ==
The ENF group had members from eight countries.

Country	Name		Ideology	EU party	MEPs	Notes
Austria	Freedom Party of Austria	FPÖ	National conservatism Right-wing populism	MENF	4 / 18	Franz Obermayr, Georg Mayer, Harald Vilimsky, Barbara Kappel
Belgium	Vlaams Belang	VB	Flemish nationalism Right-wing populism	MENF	1 / 21	Gerolf Annemans
France	National Rally	RN	French nationalism Right-wing populism	MENF	15 / 74	Marie-Christine Arnautu, Nicolas Bay, Dominique Bilde, Marie-Christine Boutonnet, Steeve Briois, Jacques Colombier, Jean-François Jalkh, France Jamet, Gilles Lebreton, Christelle Lechevalier, Philippe Loiseau, Dominique Martin, Joëlle Mélin, Jean-Luc Schaffhauser, Mylène Troszczynski
Germany	The Blue Party	BP	National conservatism Economic liberalism	MENF	1 / 96	Marcus Pretzell
Italy	Northern League	LN	Nationalism; Right-wing populism	MENF	6 / 83	Mara Bizzotto, Mario Borghezio, Angelo Ciocca, Giancarlo Scottà, Marco Zanni, Danilo Oscar Lancini
Netherlands	Party for Freedom	PVV	Dutch nationalism Right-wing populism	None	4 / 26	Marcel de Graaff, André Elissen, Olaf Stuger, Auke Zijlstra
Poland	Congress of the New Right	KNP	Libertarian conservatism Right-wing populism	EAF (Marusik)	2 / 51	Michał Marusik, Stanisław Żółtek
United Kingdom	UK Independence Party	UKIP	Right-wing populism British nationalism	None	2 / 73	Gerard Batten, Stuart Agnew

=== Former members ===
Country	Initial party		MEPs	Duration	Joined party		Moved to
France	National Rally	RN	Aymeric Chauprade	24 June–9 November 2015	The Free French	LFL	Non-Inscrits
France	National Rally	RN	Mireille d'Ornano	15 June 2015 – 2 October 2017	The Patriots	LP	EFDD
France	National Rally	RN	Sophie Montel	15 June 2015 – 2 October 2017	The Patriots	LP	EFDD
France	National Rally	RN	Florian Philippot	15 June 2015 – 2 October 2017	The Patriots	LP	EFDD
France	National Rally	RN	Bernard Monot	24 June 2015 – 31 May 2018	Debout la France	DLF	EFDD
France	National Rally	RN	Sylvie Goddyn	15 June 2015 – 19 October 2018	Debout la France	DLF	EFDD
Romania	Conservative Party	PC	Laurențiu Rebega	15 July 2015 – 2 March 2018	Independent		Non-Inscrits
United Kingdom	UK Independence Party	UKIP	Jane Collins	16 January–15 April 2019	Brexit Party	BP	EFDD

== Leadership ==
- Co-president: Nicolas Bay
- Co-president: Marcel de Graaff
- Vice-president: Gerolf Annemans
- Vice-president: Janice Atkinson
- Vice-president: Michał Marusik
- Vice-president: Marcus Pretzell
- Vice-president: Matteo Salvini
- Vice-president: Harald Vilimsky

== See also ==
- European Alliance of Peoples and Nations
- Europe of Freedom and Direct Democracy
- Europe of Nations
