= Gheorghe Pănculescu =

Gheorghe Pănculescu might refer to:

- Gheorghe Pănculescu (engineer), Romanian engineer
- Gheorghe Pănculescu (general), the last Romanian World War I veteran
