= List of members of the European Parliament for Malta, 2014–2019 =

This is a list of the six members of the European Parliament for Malta in the 2014 to 2019 session.

== List ==
| Name | National party | EP Group |
|---|---|---|
| David Casa | Nationalist Party | EPP |
| Therese Comodini Cachia (2014–2017) | Nationalist Party | EPP |
| Miriam Dalli | Labour Party | S&D |
| Francis Zammit Dimech (2017–2019) | Nationalist Party | EPP |
| Roberta Metsola | Nationalist Party | EPP |
| Marlene Mizzi | Labour Party | S&D |
| Alfred Sant | Labour Party | S&D |

=== Party representation ===
| National party | EP Group | Seats | ± |
|---|---|---|---|
| Labour Party | S&D | 3 / 6 | −1 |
| Nationalist Party | EPP | 3 / 6 | +1 |

== Notes ==
- European Parliament (2014). "European Parliament / Results of the 2014 European elections". European Parliament.
