= Sharon Ellul-Bonici =

Maltese Eurosceptic politician (1970–2025)

Personal details
- Born: 2 August 1970
- Died: c. 31 August 2025 (aged 55)
- Party: Partit Laburista
- Other political affiliations: Europeans United for Democracy; European Alliance for Freedom
- Spouse: Kevin Ellul-Bonici
- Children: 3
- Relatives: Andy Ellul (brother)
- Education: University of Leicester

Sharon Ellul-Bonici (2 August 1970 – c. 31 August 2025) was a Maltese Eurosceptic politician.

== Background ==
Ellul-Bonici was born on 2 August 1970, and was the sister of fellow Labour politician Andy Ellul.

Sharon was married to Kevin Ellul Bonici. The couple had three sons – Stevey ellul bonici a member of the river of love church group and Jamie ellul bonici a compiler architect engineer, and Zakk ellul bonici an artist. Zakk died in Maastricht in September 2020 at the age of 24. Stevey stood as a candidate in the 2022 Maltese general election in the Sixth and Third Districts for ABBA.

Ellul-Bonici died in August 2025, at the age of 55. Her death was announced by her brother Andy.

== Career ==
Sharon Ellul-Bonici was a member of the soft eurosceptic Malta Labour Party. She tried to obtain her party's endorsement as a candidate for the 2004 European Parliament election, but was turned down for her hard eurosceptic links. Ellul-Bonici was at the time active in pan-European organisations such as No2EU and TEAM. The party's vigilance board feared that – once elected – she could join Europe of Democracies and Diversities rather than the PES group.

For the 2009 EU election she was fielded on the Labour Party list, but was not elected to the European Parliament.

She was the founding secretary-general of the European Alliance for Freedom, a Eurosceptic European political party, established in late 2010, and led by former UKIP europarliamentarian Godfrey Bloom.

== Controversy ==
In September 2015, Ellul-Bonici caused controversy when she made a Facebook comment saying "suspend Schengen, armies out on European frontiers and shoot to kill. That's the only temporary solution". Her comments were criticised by human rights NGO Aditus Foundation and its director Neil Falzon.
