= Vălenii de Munte =

- Town
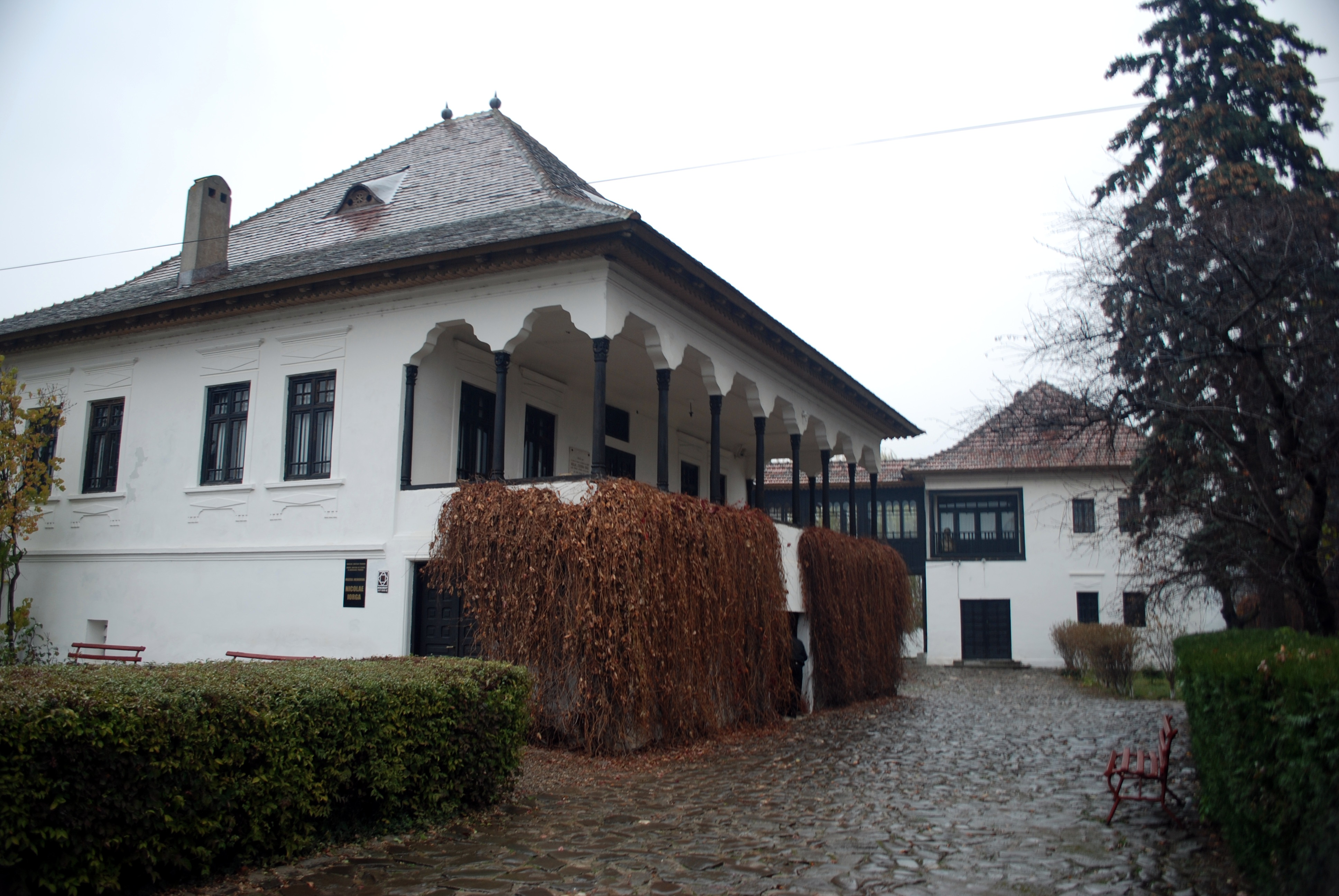
- The Nicolae Iorga memorial museum in Vălenii de Munte

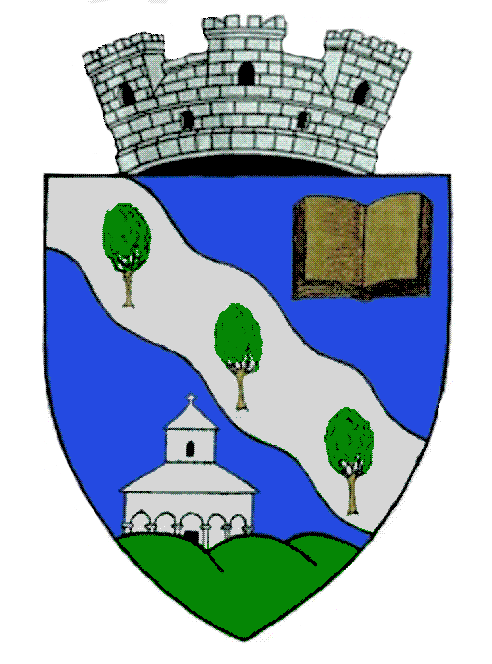
- Coat of arms

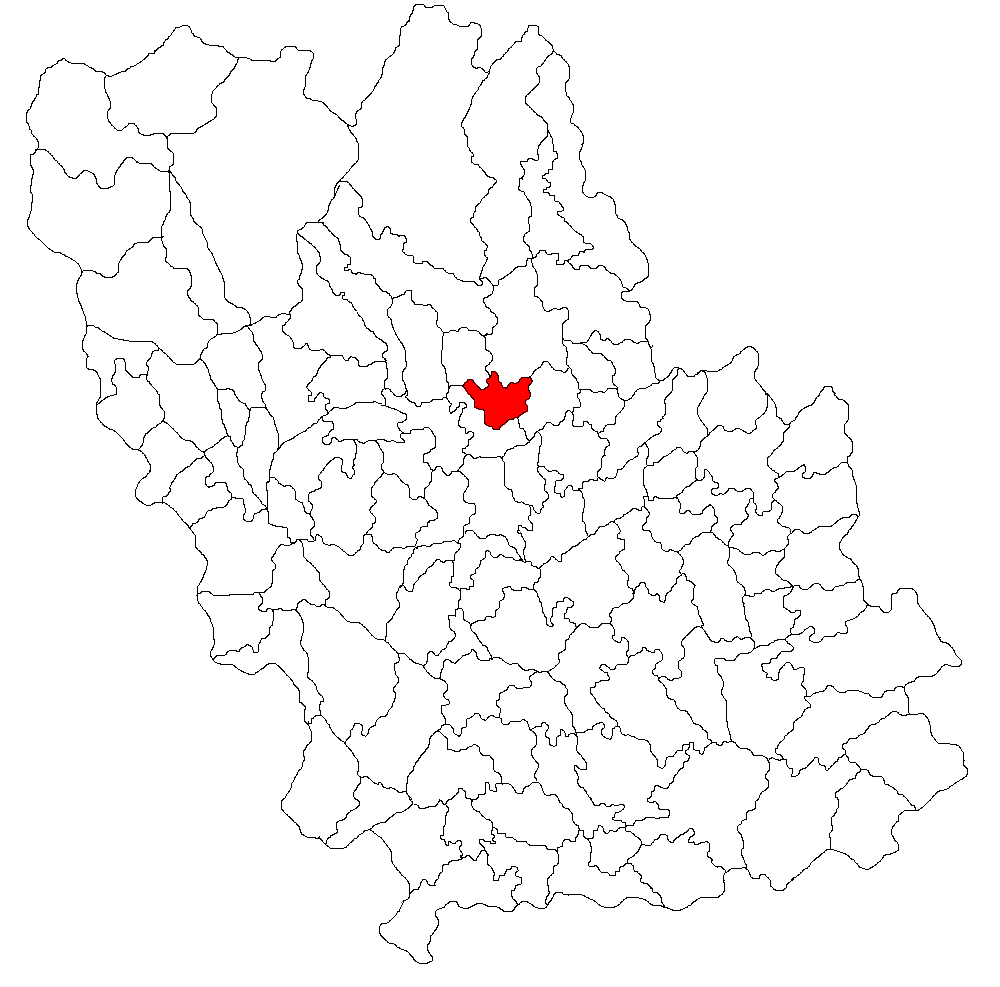
- Location in Prahova County

- Location in Romania
- Coordinates: 45°11′8″N 26°2′23″E
- Country: Romania
- County: Prahova

Government
  - Mayor (2024–2028): Florin Constantin (PSD)
- Area: 21.59 km^{2} (8.34 sq mi)
- Elevation: 350 m (1,150 ft)
- Population (2021-12-01): 12,044
  - Density: 557.9/km^{2} (1,445/sq mi)
- Time zone: UTC+02:00 (EET)
  - Summer (DST): UTC+03:00 (EEST)
- Postal code: 106400
- Area code: (+40) 02 44
- Vehicle reg.: PH
- Website: www.valeniidemunte.com.ro

Vălenii de Munte (Romanian pronunciation: [vəˈlenij de ˈmunte]) is a town in Prahova County, southern Romania (the historical region of Muntenia), with a population of 12,044 as of 2021. It lies In the Teleajen river valley, 28 kilometres (17 mi) north of the county seat of Ploiești.

The town's sister cities are Eaubonne, Cimișlia, and Sarandë.

== History ==
Historical population
Year	Pop.	±% p.a.
1912	3,704	—
1930	4,237	+0.75%
1948	4,491	+0.32%
1956	5,472	+2.50%
1966	7,380	+3.04%
1977	10,508	+3.26%
1992	13,689	+1.78%
2002	13,898	+0.15%
2011	11,707	−1.89%
2021	12,044	+0.28%
Source: Census data

The first recorded reference about the settlement dates back to 1431. In 1645 Vălenii de Munte (or Văleni for short) became the official residence of the then Săcueni County. Documents from 1832 note Valeni as having 518 households and 2,590 citizens. At the end of the 19th century, Vălenii de Munte was an urban commune, formed from the Văleni (Târgul-Văleni), Turburea, and Valea Gardului villages, having a total of 3,000 residents, who benefited from having a local hospital, pharmacy, post office, and telegraph station. In 1907 the historian Nicolae Iorga settled in Văleni, opening in January 1908 the People's Summer University. In 1952 Vălenii de Munte became the residence of Teleajen Raion within the Ploiești Region. The status was lost in the 1968 Administrative Reform, when Văleni became one of the towns of the newly established Prahova County.

== People ==
=== Natives ===
- Roberto Alecsandru (born 1996), footballer
- Sergiu Arnăutu (born 1990), footballer
- Mădălina Manole (1967–2010), singer, actress
- Gheorghe Pănculescu (1844–1924), engineer
- Laurențiu Rebega (born 1976), politician
- Horia Stamatu (1912–1989), poet and essayist

=== Notable residents ===
- Nicolae Iorga (1871–1940), historian, politician, writer
- Nicolae Tonitza (1886–1940), painter

== Museums ==
- Nicolae Iorga memorial house
- Teleajen Valley ethnographic museum
- Plum tree growing natural science museum
- Queen Mary religious arts museum and national missionary school

== Climate ==
Vălenii de Munte has a humid continental climate (Cfb in the Köppen climate classification).

Climate data for Vălenii de Munte
Month	Jan	Feb	Mar	Apr	May	Jun	Jul	Aug	Sep	Oct	Nov	Dec	Year
Mean daily maximum °C (°F)	2.2 (36.0)	4.3 (39.7)	9.1 (48.4)	14.6 (58.3)	19.6 (67.3)	23.1 (73.6)	25.3 (77.5)	25.4 (77.7)	20.2 (68.4)	14.3 (57.7)	8.8 (47.8)	3.9 (39.0)	14.2 (57.6)
Daily mean °C (°F)	−2.2 (28.0)	−0.4 (31.3)	4 (39)	9.7 (49.5)	14.9 (58.8)	18.7 (65.7)	20.7 (69.3)	20.7 (69.3)	15.7 (60.3)	9.8 (49.6)	4.7 (40.5)	−0.3 (31.5)	9.7 (49.4)
Mean daily minimum °C (°F)	−6.1 (21.0)	−4.7 (23.5)	−1.1 (30.0)	4.2 (39.6)	9.3 (48.7)	13.4 (56.1)	15.6 (60.1)	15.5 (59.9)	11 (52)	5.7 (42.3)	1.4 (34.5)	−3.7 (25.3)	5.0 (41.1)
Average precipitation mm (inches)	45 (1.8)	44 (1.7)	59 (2.3)	88 (3.5)	130 (5.1)	138 (5.4)	136 (5.4)	101 (4.0)	72 (2.8)	62 (2.4)	55 (2.2)	53 (2.1)	983 (38.7)
Source: https://en.climate-data.org/europe/romania/prahova/valenii-de-munte-15296/

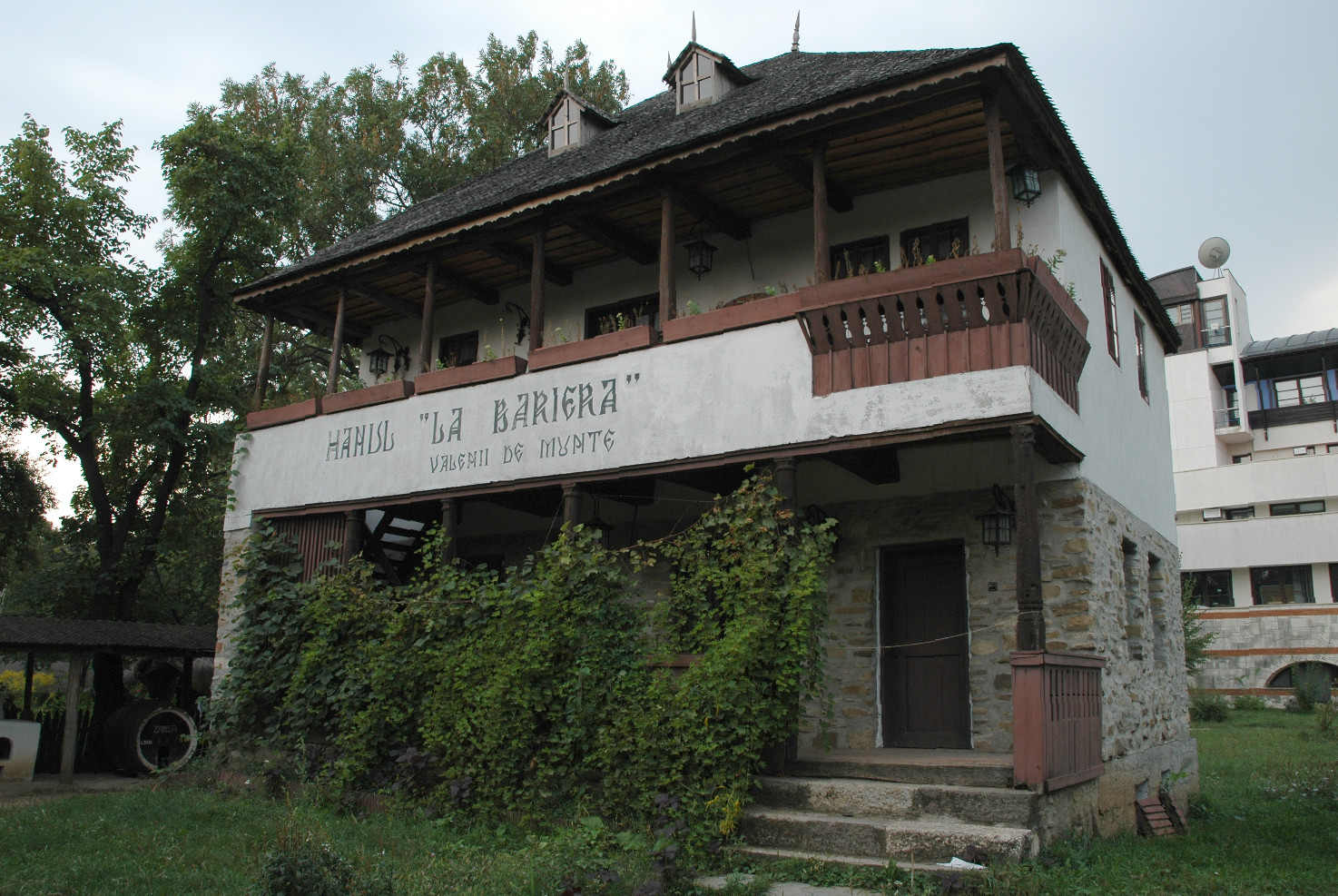
The "La barieră" ("The barrier") inn, originally located in Vălenii de Munte, can be seen today at the Village Museum in Bucharest.
