= KORWiN (2024) =

Political party in Poland

Confederation for the Renewal of the Republic of Liberty and Independence Konfederacja Odnowy Rzeczypospolitej Wolność i Niepodległość
- Abbreviation: KORWiN
- Chairman: Janusz Korwin-Mikke
- Vice-Chairman: Robert Iwaszkiewicz; Jacek Bartyzel
- Founder: Janusz Korwin-Mikke
- Founded: 5 January 2024
- Registered: 9 April 2024
- Split from: New Hope
- Headquarters: Anders Street 37/59A, Warsaw, Poland
- Ideology: Conservative libertarianism; Hard Euroscepticism
- Political position: Far-right
- National affiliation: Broad fire extinguisher front
- Colours: Gold; Purple

Website
- korwin.com.pl

Confederation for the Renewal of the Republic of Liberty and Independence (Polish: Konfederacja Odnowy Rzeczypospolitej Wolność i Niepodległość, KORWiN) is a minor far-right political party in Poland. The party was established by Janusz Korwin-Mikke in 2024 following his departure from New Hope (formerly also called KORWiN).

== History ==
=== Foundation ===
The founding of the party was preceded by the suspension of Janusz Korwin-Mikke in New Hope in October 2023. Following his suspension, on 13 December 2023 Korwin-Mikke announced the intention to found a new political party. The party was founded and submitted to the party registry on 5 January 2024, and registered on 9 April 2024 with Janusz Korwin-Mikke as chairman, Robert Iwaszkiewicz and Jacek Bartyzel as vice-chairmen and Roland Czarniawski as secretary.

=== 2024 and 2025 elections ===
In March 2024, the party announced its cooperation with Bezpartyjni Samorządowcy in the 2024 Polish local elections, with Korwin-Mikke being fielded on Bezpartyjni Samorządowcy's electoral list in the Warsaw presidential election. Ultimately, Korwin-Mikke won 1.4% of the popular vote; he argued that his result was not a defeat and was above his "usual performance".

Later in 2024, Marek Woch became the leader of Bezpartyjni Samorządowcy and expanded the party's cooperation with KORWiN. In the 2024 European Parliament election in Poland, the parties created an electoral committee Bezpartyjni Samorządowcy – Normalna Polska w Normalnej Europie (Polish: Bezpartyjni Samorządowcy - Normal Poland in Normal Europe). The committee opposed the European Union's New Pact on Migration and Asylum and stressed the need to restore the sovereignty of member states against central dictates of the EU. It won 108,926 votes, which amounted to 0.93% of the popular vote and was not sufficient to win any seats. Korwin-Mikke himself topped the committee's electoral list in Silesia, where he won 4343 votes, amounting to 0.33% of the popular vote there.

In the 2025 Polish presidential election, KORWiN supported Grzegorz Braun's candidacy. Following the split of Grzegorz Braun's Confederation of the Polish Crown from the Confederation alliance, Braun planned to establish a single political party with Korwin-Mikke. Early on, the party was called "KoBra" (Cobra, from the names of Korwin-Mikke and Braun).

Ultimately, the idea was abandoned, and in June 2025, Braun's party made a decision to pursue an independent start in the next parliamentary election. This decision was met with disappointment from Korwin and his party. Instead, Braun and his movement have created a political alliance known as the "broad fire extinguisher front". KORWiN became associated with the movement.

=== Later activity ===
In May 2025, the party failed to submit the financial statement for 2024, which results in deregistration. The party explained that its treasures submitted the report by email. However, the National Electoral Commission does not recognize reports submitted by email. The party then sent the report by traditional mail, but after the deadline.

On 2 and 4 September 2025, KORWiN's activists also registered the parties Confederation (Polish: Konfederacja, KonFed), and Radical Right (Polish: Radykalna Prawica, Prawica-R). According to Korwin-Mikke, this was done for technical and electoral reasons.

On 8 September, Rzeczpospolita speculated that the registration of the two parties may had been done to prevent Korwin-Mikke and his environment from having no formal political party in the event of deregistration. As of October, the party was still registered, meaning that Korwin-Mikke had 3 parties at the time. However, the party was eventually deregistered on 21 November 2025; however, the court's decision to deregister the party was non-final (Polish: nieprawomocny).

In April 2026, KORWiN announced its merger with the Radical Right, with both parties holding conventions confirming the merger. This was done to prevent the party from being delegalized after the non-final deregistration court decision from November 2025. Radical Right subsequently changed its name to KORWiN, allowing the party to continue functioning. On 8 July 2026, party's activists attempted to break into the office of a Ukrainian company to check whether employers "were not supporting Stepan Bandera". Party activists were detained by the police; the party commented on the incident by stating that Ukraine is hostile towards Poland, and stating that Ukrainians should operate businesses in their own country instead.

== Ideology ==
The party has been described as far-right, and Hard Eurosceptic; it supported a "Polexit" from the European Union. It is also considered conservative libertarian, and expressed its opposition to any forms of state intervention or etatism.

In Gazeta Wyborcza, Piotr Głuchowski wrote that the party combines an "extremely economically liberal, socially conservative worldview and at the same time libertarian program", noting that it reflects the program of Real Politics Union, Korwin-Mikke's first party. The party consists only of Korwin-Mikke's loyalists who followed him after his expulsion from Confederation.

== Electoral results ==
=== Local offices ===
| Election year | Candidate | Office | # of votes | % of vote | Elected? |
|---|---|---|---|---|---|
| 2024 | Janusz Korwin-Mikke | Mayor of Warsaw | 10,839 | 1.40% | No |
Joint candidate with Bezpartyjni Samorządowcy.

=== European Parliament ===
| Election | Votes | % | Seats | +/– | EP Group |
|---|---|---|---|---|---|
| 2024 | 108,926 | 0.93 | 0 / 53 | Steady | – |
As part of Bezpartyjni Samorządowcy – Normal Poland in Normal Europe (Polish: Bezpartyjni Samorządowcy – Normalna Polska w Normalnej Europie).

=== Presidential ===
| Election year | 1st round | | |
| Election year | Candidate | # of overall votes | % of overall vote |
|---|---|---|---|
| 2025 | Supported Grzegorz Braun | 1,242,917 | 6.34 (#4) |
