= List of members of the European Parliament for Cyprus, 2014–2019 =

This is a list of the 6 members of the European Parliament for Cyprus in the 2014 to 2019 session.

== List ==
Name	Photograph	National party	EP Group	Ref
Lefteris Christoforou		Democratic Rally	EPP	
Takis Hadjigeorgiou		Progressive Party of Working People	EUL–NGL	
Costas Mavrides		Democratic Party	S&D	
Dimitris Papadakis		Movement for Social Democracy	S&D	
Neoklis Sylikiotis		Progressive Party of Working People	EUL–NGL	
Eleni Theocharous		Democratic Rally (2014-2015) Solidarity Movement (2015-2019)	EPP (2014-2015) ECR (2016-2019)	

=== Party representation ===
National party	EP Group	Seats	±
Progressive Party of Working People	EUL–NGL	2 / 6	Steady
Democratic Rally	EPP	(2014-2015) 2 / 6	Steady
Democratic Rally	EPP	(2015-2019) 1 / 6	▼1
Solidarity Movement	ECR	(2014-2015) 0 / 6	Steady
Solidarity Movement	ECR	(2015-2019) 1 / 6	▲1
Democratic Party	S&D	1 / 6	Steady
Movement for Social Democracy	S&D	1 / 6	▲1
