= György Baló =

Hungarian television presenter

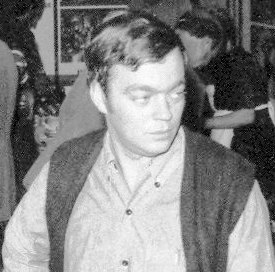
- Born: June 14, 1947; Budapest, Hungary
- Died: March 18, 2019 (aged 71); Budapest, Hungary
- Education: Eötvös Loránd University
- Occupations: Television and radio broadcaster
- Years active: 1970–2019
- Spouse: Krisztina Morvai (until 2011)
- Children: 3

György Baló (14 June 1947 – 18 March 2019) was a Hungarian broadcast journalist and academic lecturer, who served as anchorman for various political talk shows of the Hungarian public television channel Magyar Televízió (MTV) since the 1970s.
