= Philip Claeys =

Member of the European Parliament
- In office 16 June 2003 – 30 June 2014

Personal details
- Born: 24 May 1965 (age 60) Ghent, Belgium
- Party: Vlaams Belang (since 2004); Vlaams Blok (before 2004)
- Occupation: Politician

Philip Claeys (Dutch: [ˈfilɪp ˈklaːis]; born 24 May 1965) is a Belgian Flanders-based politician for the Vlaams Belang.

== Political career ==
Claeys was a Member of the European Parliament from 2003 to 2014. He participated in the international counter-jihad conferences in Brussels in 2007 and in 2012. Since late 2010, he was a board member of the eurosceptic party European Alliance for Freedom, which was dissolved in 2016. From 2017 to 2019 he was the secretary-general of the Europe of Nations and Freedom group, and since 2019 he has been secretary of the Identity and Democracy group.
