= Robert Iwaszkiewicz =

Polish politician (born 1962)

Robert Iwaszkiewicz MEP
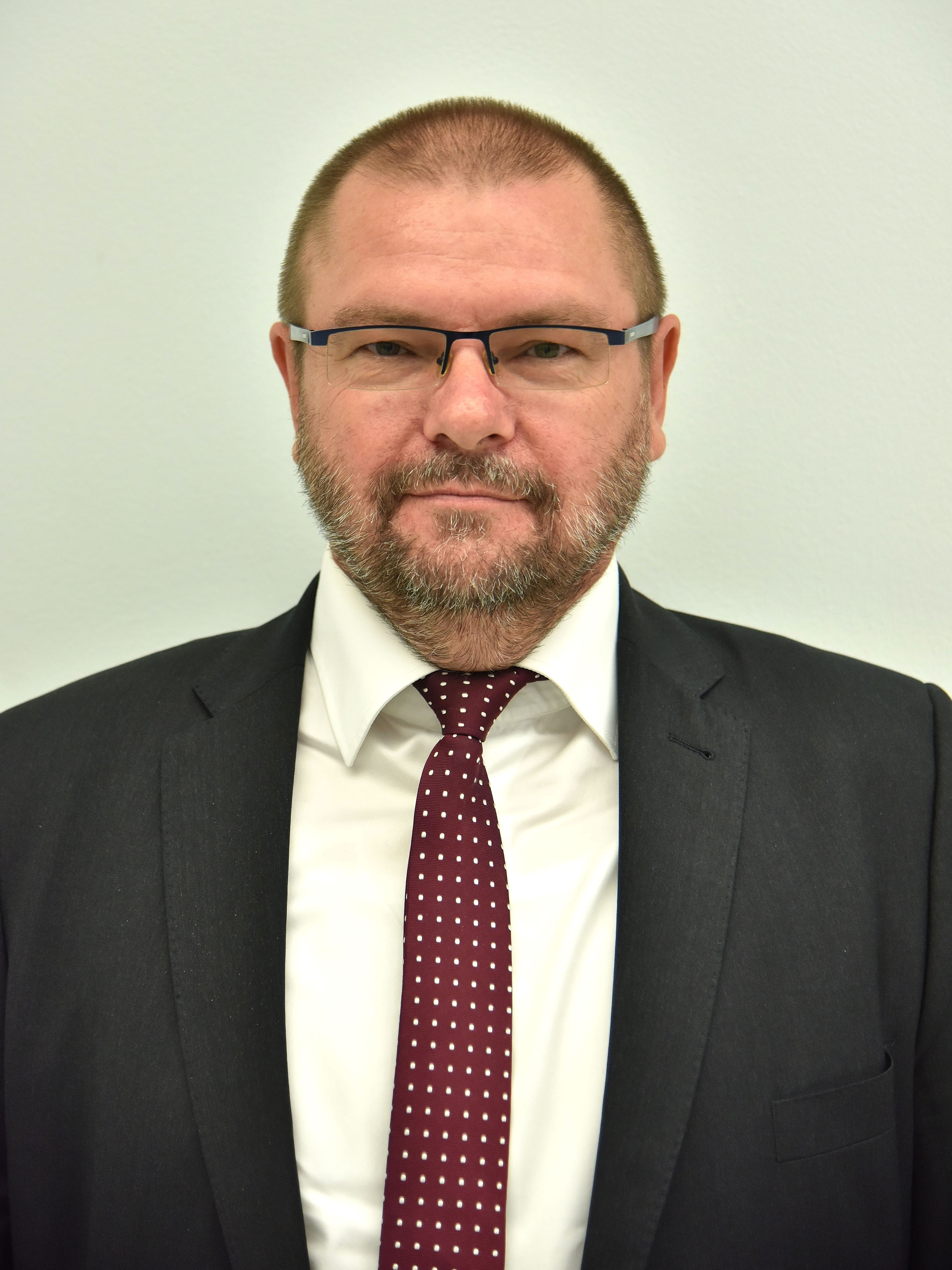

Member of the European Parliament for Lower Silesian and Opole
- In office 25 May 2014 – 31 May 2019

Personal details
- Born: Robert Jarosław Iwaszkiewicz; 17 April 1962 (age 64) Wrocław, Polish People's Republic
- Party: KORWiN
- Other political affiliations: Congress of the New Right (2011–2015); Real Politics Union (2004–2011); New Hope (formerly); Confederation (formerly)
- Education: Agricultural University of Wroclaw

Robert Jarosław Iwaszkiewicz (born 17 May 1962) is a Polish politician affiliated with the KORWiN party. In May 2014 he was elected as a Member of the European Parliament (MEP).

== Biography ==
Originally a non-inscrit in the EP, Iwaszkiewicz joined the Europe of Freedom and Direct Democracy (EFDD) on 20 October 2014. The EFDD had briefly ceased to exist when Iveta Grigule left the group since it no longer had representatives from seven countries as the EP rules require. Upon Iwaszkiewicz joining, group leader Nigel Farage stated "To paraphrase Mark Twain 'Rumours of our death have been greatly exaggerated.'" as the group again had members from the required seven countries. The three other members of KNP remained non-inscrits. Iwaszkiewicz cited UKIP's support for free market economy and fight against EU bureaucracy as reasons for joining the group.

He is a former member of the UPR and KNP. In 2015 he was co-founder of paleolibertarian party New Hope.

He is a member of the European Parliament Committee on the Internal Market and Consumer Protection. Member of the Organization of Polish Monarchists.

He is an individual member of the Extreme-Right European political party Alliance of European National Movements.

In 2024, after splitting from New Hope, he co-founded the KORWiN party with Janusz Korwin-Mikke.
