= André Elissen =

Dutch politician, consultant and police officer

André Elissen MEP
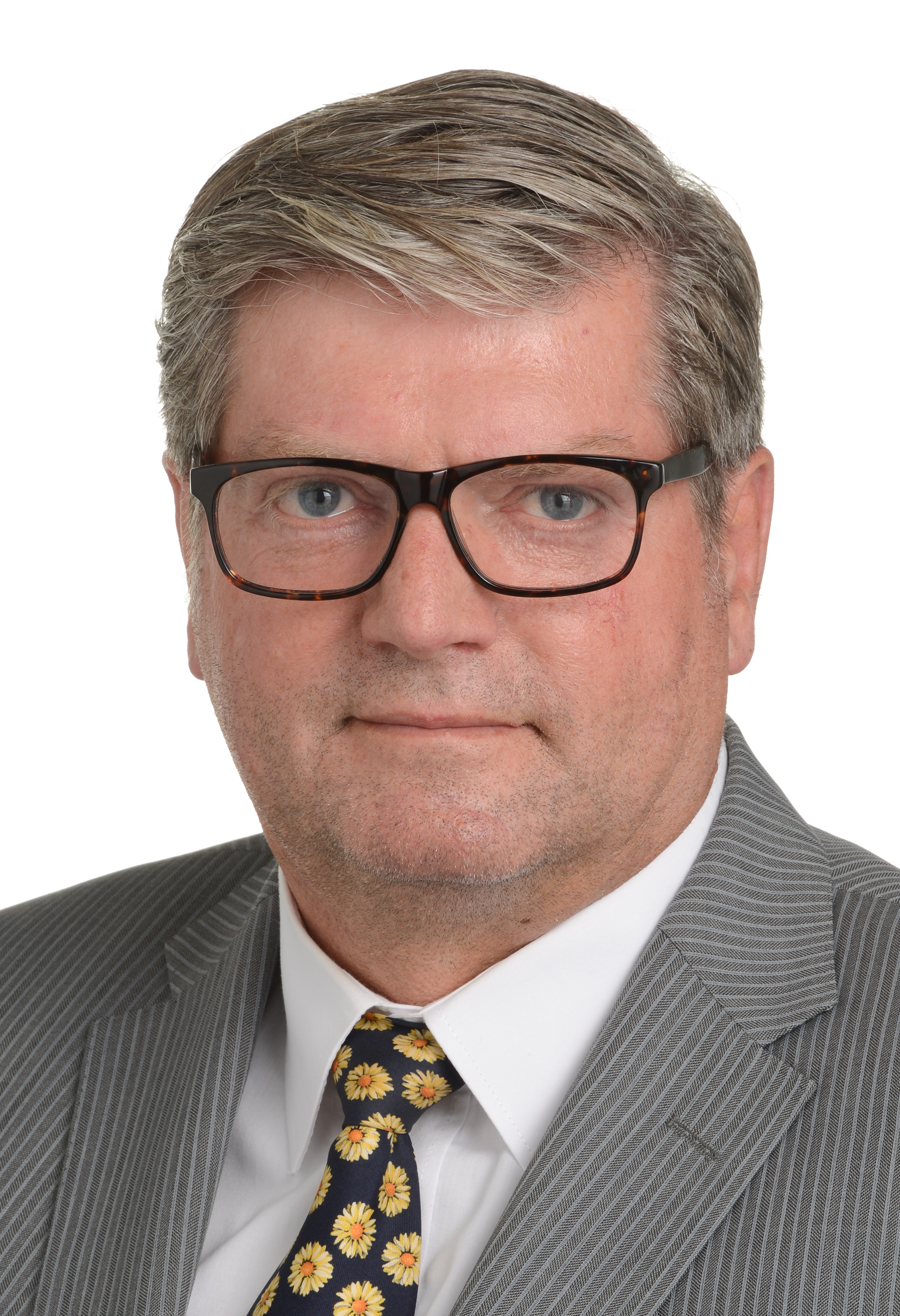

Member of the European Parliament
- In office 13 June 2017 – 2 July 2019
- Constituency: Netherlands

Member of the House of Representatives of the Netherlands
- In office 17 June 2010 – 19 September 2012

Personal details
- Born: 13 February 1960 (age 66) Frechen, Germany
- Party: Dutch; Party for Freedom; EU; Europe of Nations and Freedom

André Elissen (born 12 February 1960 in Frechen, Germany) is a Dutch politician and consultant as well as police officer. As a member of the Party for Freedom (Partij voor de Vrijheid) he was an MP from 17 June 2010 to 19 September 2012. He focused on matters of constitutional law, local government finance, the Dutch Royal House, counter-terrorism, emergency management and the Dutch secret service.
