= List of members of the European Parliament for Portugal, 2014–2019 =

This is a list of the members of the European Parliament for Portugal in the 2014 to 2019 session, ordered by name.

See 2014 European Parliament election in Portugal for further information on these elections in Portugal, and 2014 European Parliament election for discussion on likely changes to the Parliamentary Groups.

== List ==
Name	National party	EP Group
Francisco Assis	Socialist Party	S&D
Maria João Rodrigues	Socialist Party	S&D
Carlos Zorrinho	Socialist Party	S&D
Elisa Ferreira (2014–2016)	Socialist Party	S&D
Ricardo Serrão Santos	Socialist Party	S&D
Ana Gomes	Socialist Party	S&D
Pedro Silva Pereira	Socialist Party	S&D
Liliana Rodrigues	Socialist Party	S&D
Manuel António dos Santos (2016–2019)	Socialist Party	S&D
Paulo Rangel	Social Democratic Party	EPP
Fernando Ruas	Social Democratic Party	EPP
Sofia Ribeiro	Social Democratic Party	EPP
Carlos Coelho	Social Democratic Party	EPP
Cláudia Aguiar	Social Democratic Party	EPP
José Manuel Fernandes	Social Democratic Party	EPP
Nuno Melo	CDS – People's Party	EPP
João Ferreira	Portuguese Communist Party	EUL–NGL
Inês Zuber (2014–2016)	Portuguese Communist Party	EUL–NGL
Miguel Viegas	Portuguese Communist Party	EUL–NGL
João Pimenta Lopes (2016–2019)	Portuguese Communist Party	EUL–NGL
António Marinho e Pinto	Earth Party (2014); Independent (2014–2015); Democratic Republican Party (2015–2019)	ALDE
José Inácio Faria	Earth Party	ALDE (2014–2016); EPP (2016–2019)
Marisa Matias	Left Bloc	EUL–NGL
