= Gheorghe Pănculescu (engineer) =

Romanian engineer (1844–1924)

Gheorghe Pănculescu (1844–1924) was a Romanian engineer born in the Romanian town Vălenii de Munte, district of Prahova, who designed the railway line between the capital city Bucharest and Predeal (1878).

== Life and work ==
Born in 1844 in Vălenii de Munte, Pănculescu went to study abroad and graduated from the Zurich Science and Technology University, and then joined the 'Société des Établissements Eiffel' engineering company founded by Gustave Eiffel, recommended by famous Romanian poet Vasile Alecsandri. In 1878, Pănculescu returned to Romania in order to design and build the railway line between Predeal and Bucharest, which he completed in less than a year, despite the five-year contract initially drafted; this is attributed to the truly innovative system for joining the metal girders together in the pre-assembly phase, away from the tracks' location which he devised. In 1879, Gustave Eiffel made a documented visit to Pănculescu's house in Vălenii de Munte, in what is today the Nicolae Iorga Memorial Museum, where he was shown the technology used by Pănculescu for the construction of his railway line. Eiffel himself documented Pănculescu's contribution in his work titled 'Communication sur les travaux de la tour de 300 m' written in 1887. The same technology was used by Eiffel in building the Eiffel Tower. Gheorghe Pănculescu became the General Inspector of the CFR SA, the Romanian national train operator.

== Recognition ==
The only significant research of this collaboration between Gheorghe Pănculescu and Gustave Eiffel has been done by Prof. Eugen Stănescu, adjunct director of the Museum of History and Archaeology in Prahova, Romania. Stănescu went to Paris and researched Eiffel's archives, where he came across the document 'Communication sur les travaux de la tour de 300 m' mentioned above, which gives credit to Pănculescu's innovation and its crucial role to the completion of the tower.

On 15 September 2004, during an official ceremony, a local school from Vălenii de Munte dating back from 1774 received the name 'The Gheorghe Pănculescu School of Arts and Crafts' in recognition of the genius of the inventor born in their town.

== Gallery ==
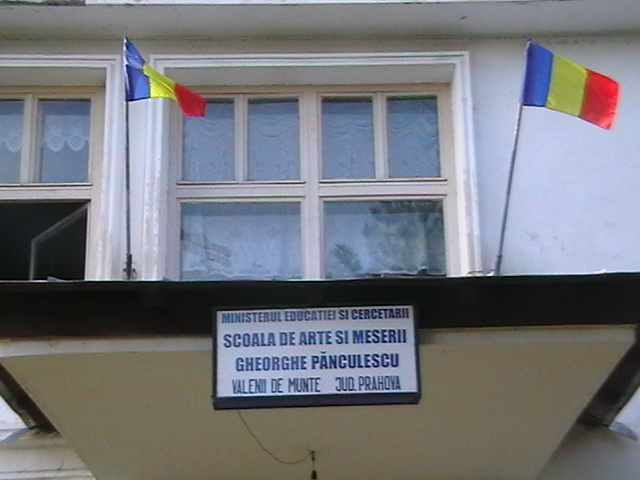
Gheorghe Pănculescu School of Arts and Crafts Entrance

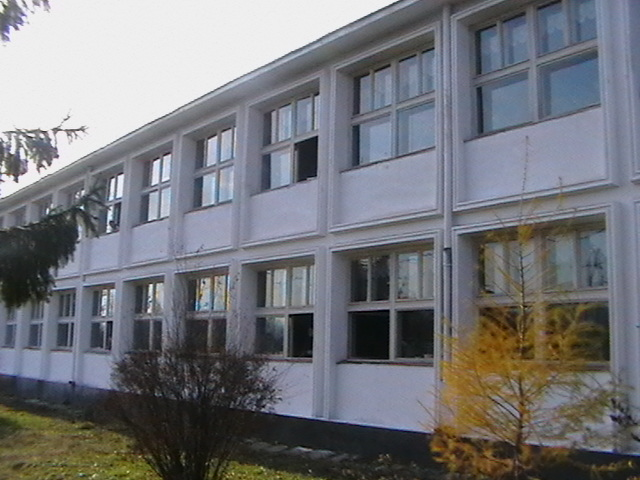
Gheorghe Pănculescu School of Arts and Crafts Side View

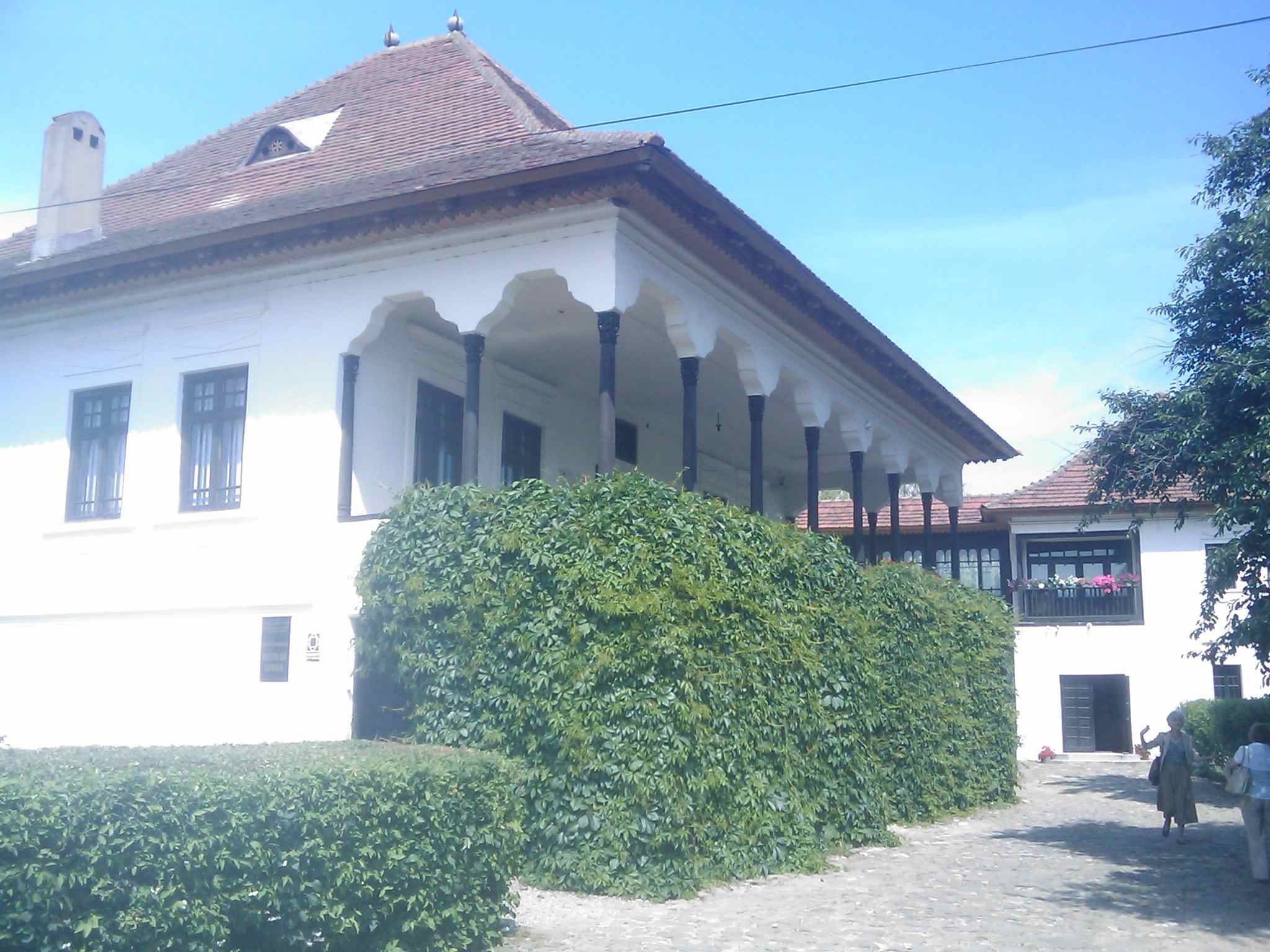
Pănculescu's House where he met Gustave Eiffel, now the Nicolae Iorga Memorial Museum
