= Christelle Lechevalier =

French politician (born 1968)

Christelle Lechevalier (born 27 September 1968) is a French National Front Member of the European Parliament for North-West France. She replaced Marine Le Pen in the European Parliament on 19 June 2017 following Le Pen's election to the National Assembly.
