= Georgios Epitidios =

Greek politician

Georgios Epitidios MEP
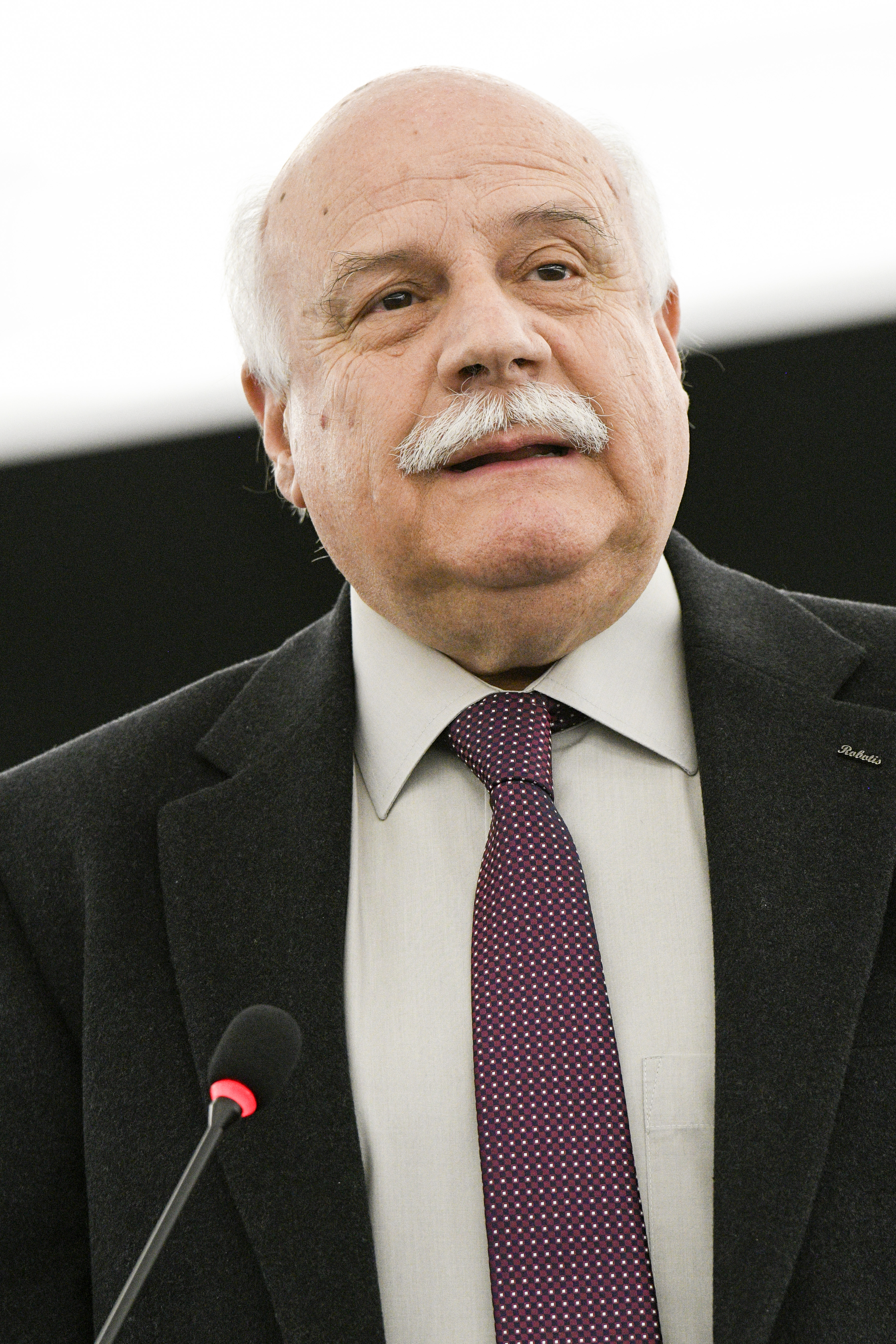

Member of the European Parliament for Greece
- In office 2 July 2014 – 2 July 2019

Personal details
- Born: 2 March 1953 (age 73)
- Party: Golden Dawn

Georgios Epitidios (Greek: Γεώργιος Επιτήδειος; born 2 March 1953) is a Greek far right politician, representing the far right Golden Dawn party and former Army officer. He was a Member of the European Parliament (MEP) from Greece between 2014 and 2019 alongside fellow General Eleftherios Synadinos.

Georgios Epitideios served in the Greek Army and retired with the rank of Lieutenant General. He comes from the town Psachna of Euboea and was born in 1953. He graduated the Hellenic Army Military Academy in 1975 and appointed as Artillery Second Lieutenant.

Also he is a graduate of the Political Science and Public Administration Department of Athens University. He speaks English and French. He is married and has two children.

He spent 18 years of active service in Combat Units as Battery Commander in Towed, Self Propelled and Air Defence Artillery Battalions, Tactical Control Officer in a HAWK Battery, Deputy Commander in an Air Defence Artillery Battalion, Commander of a Towed Artillery Battalion, Deputy Commander of a Mechanized Infantry Division and Commander of the Hellenic Artillery School.

He also spent 14 years of his Military career as Staff Officer in National and Allied Headquarters namely the Hellenic Army General Staff (HAGS), the Hellenic National Defence General Staff (HNDGS), the Supreme Headquarters of Allied Powers in Europe (SHAPE), the International Military Staff of NATO (IMS), and the European Military Staff (EUMS) as Chief of the Current Operations and Crisis Management Branch. Furthermore he was Director of the Joint Doctrine Directorate and Head of the Operational Logistics Division in the Hellenic National Defence General Staff (HNDGS). Additionally he was the Higher National Representative in all conferences for the planning of NATO Exercises, Doctrines and Operational Logistics.

He has been awarded with all medals and decorations provided for his rank. In 2008 he received an honorary retirement.

Since his retirement he has been an active member of the Hellenic Institute for Strategic Studies (HEL.I.S.S). From 2008 since 2011 he has been elected as a Member of the Management Board of the Retired Army Officers Association.
