= List of members of the European Parliament for Estonia, 2014–2019 =

This is a list of members of the European Parliament for the Estonia in the 2014 to 2019 session.

See 2014 European Parliament election in Estonia for further information on these elections in Estonia.

== List ==
This table can be sorted by party or party group: click the symbol at the top of the appropriate column.

Name	National party	EP group
Hannes Hanso	Social Democratic Party (SDE)	S&D
Tunne Kelam	Pro Patria and Res Publica Union (IRL)	EPP
Urmas Paet	Estonian Reform Party (ER)	ALDE
Igor Gräzin	Estonian Reform Party (ER)	ALDE
Yana Toom	Estonian Centre Party (EK)	ALDE
Indrek Tarand	Independent	Greens/EFA
