= Barbara Kappel =

Austrian politician

Barbara Kappel MEP
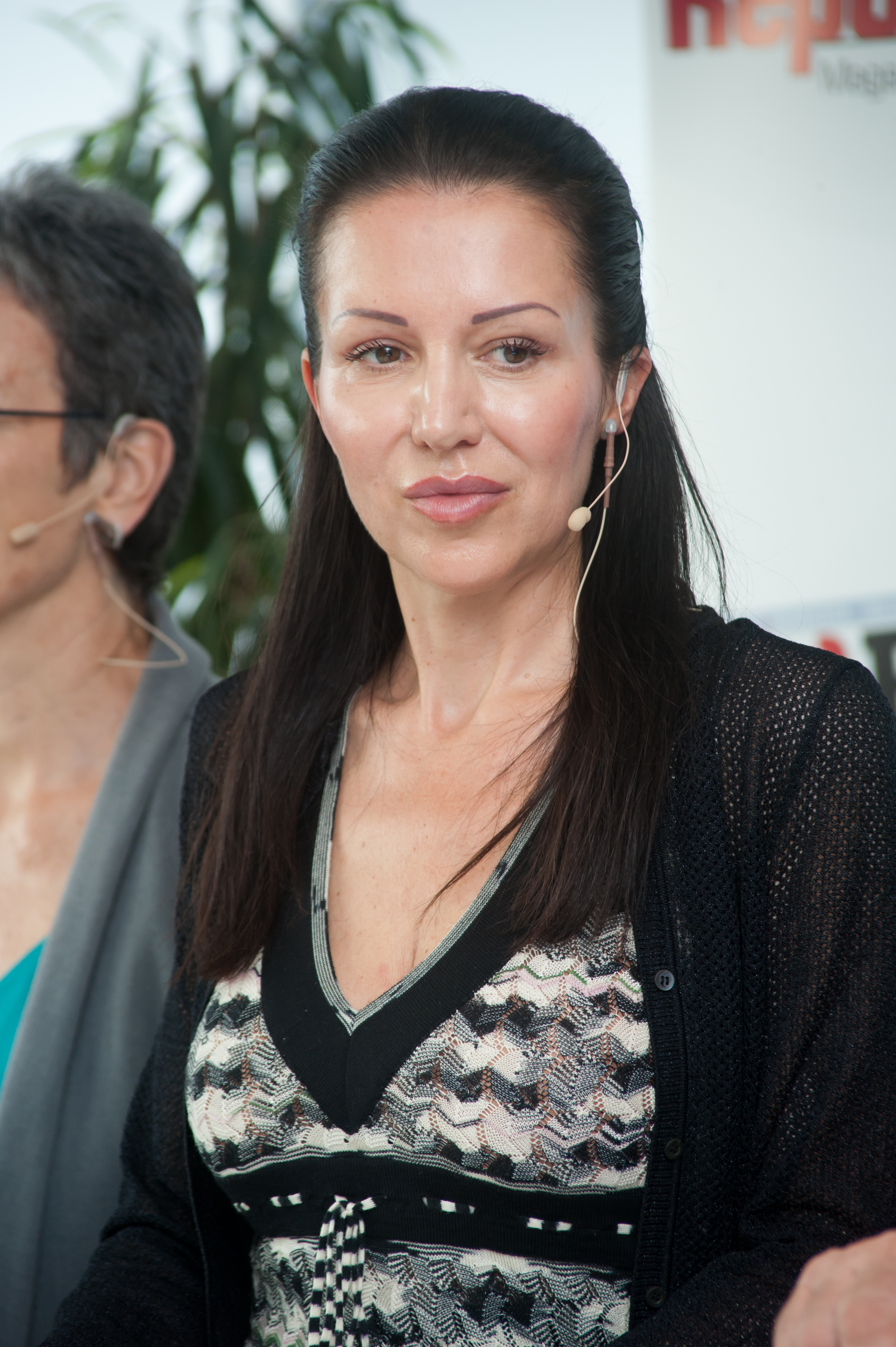

Member of the European Parliament
- Incumbent
- Assumed office 1 July 2014
- Constituency: Austria

Personal details
- Born: 16 February 1965 (age 61) Innsbruck, Tyrol, Austria
- Party: Austrian; Freedom Party of Austria; EU; Europe of Nations and Freedom

Barbara Kappel (born 16 February 1965 in Reith im Alpbachtal) is an Austrian politician. From 2010 to 2014 she was a member of the FPÖ in the Vienna State Parliament and City Council. She then moved, initially as a non-attached member, to the European Parliament, where she was a member of the Europe of Nations and Freedom group until she left in June 2019.

== Life ==
Barbara Kappel has a doctorate in economics after studying economics and social sciences in Innsbruck and Vienna. From 2000 to 2006 Kappel worked as office manager for Thomas Prinzhorn and also in a number of agencies that are closely related to the Federation of Industrialists. From 2006 to 2015, Kappel was the managing partner of the consulting company Austrian Technologies. In October 2015, she left the company.

In 2010, Kappel was part of an FPÖ campaign in which she was presented by Heinz-Christian Strache as Minister of Economy and Finance in the shadow cabinet. March 2010 she was part of the FPÖ list Pro Mittelstand in the Chamber of Commerce elections. After the state and local council elections in Vienna in 2010, where she was placed 6th on the liberal list, she moved into the state parliament. In 2016 and in the course of the formation of the government in 2017, Kappel was mentioned again in the shadow cabinet by ex-FPÖ chief Heinz-Christian Strache as a possible minister of economy.

== MEPs to the EU Parliament ==
According to a ranking by the non-governmental organization VoteWatch Europe from 2019, in which the most influential EU parliamentarians were determined, Kappel was one of the second most influential EU MPs in Austria. Overall, it ranked among the best 5% out of 751 in the ranking.

In the European Parliament, Kappel was a member of the following committees and delegations:

- Committee on Industry, Research and Energy
- Economic and Monetary Affairs Committee
- Special Committee on Financial Crime, Tax Evasion and Tax Avoidance (TAX3)
- Delegation for relations with the countries of Southeast Asia and the Association of Southeast Asian Nations (ASEAN)
- Delegation for relations with the United States.

She was also a deputy member of the following committees and delegations:

- Committee on Budgetary Control
- Committee on Budgets
- Delegation for relations with the Arabian Peninsula

After the European elections in Austria in 2019, she left the European Parliament.

== Post-Parliament ==
In April 2020, text messaging conversations from 2018 and 2019 were published, from which it emerges that the then leader Harald Vilimsky and party leader Heinz-Christian Strache doubted Barbara Kappel's loyalty and she in the EU election will no longer be on a promising list place in May 2019.

In order to avoid a scandal, Kappel should voluntarily and without publicity waive her candidacy publicly and, in return, be quiescent with posts in government-related companies which she rejected. Kappel left the party in February 2020 and has not been associated with the FPÖ any further.
