= Eleftherios Synadinos =

Greek politician

Eleftherios Synadinos MEP
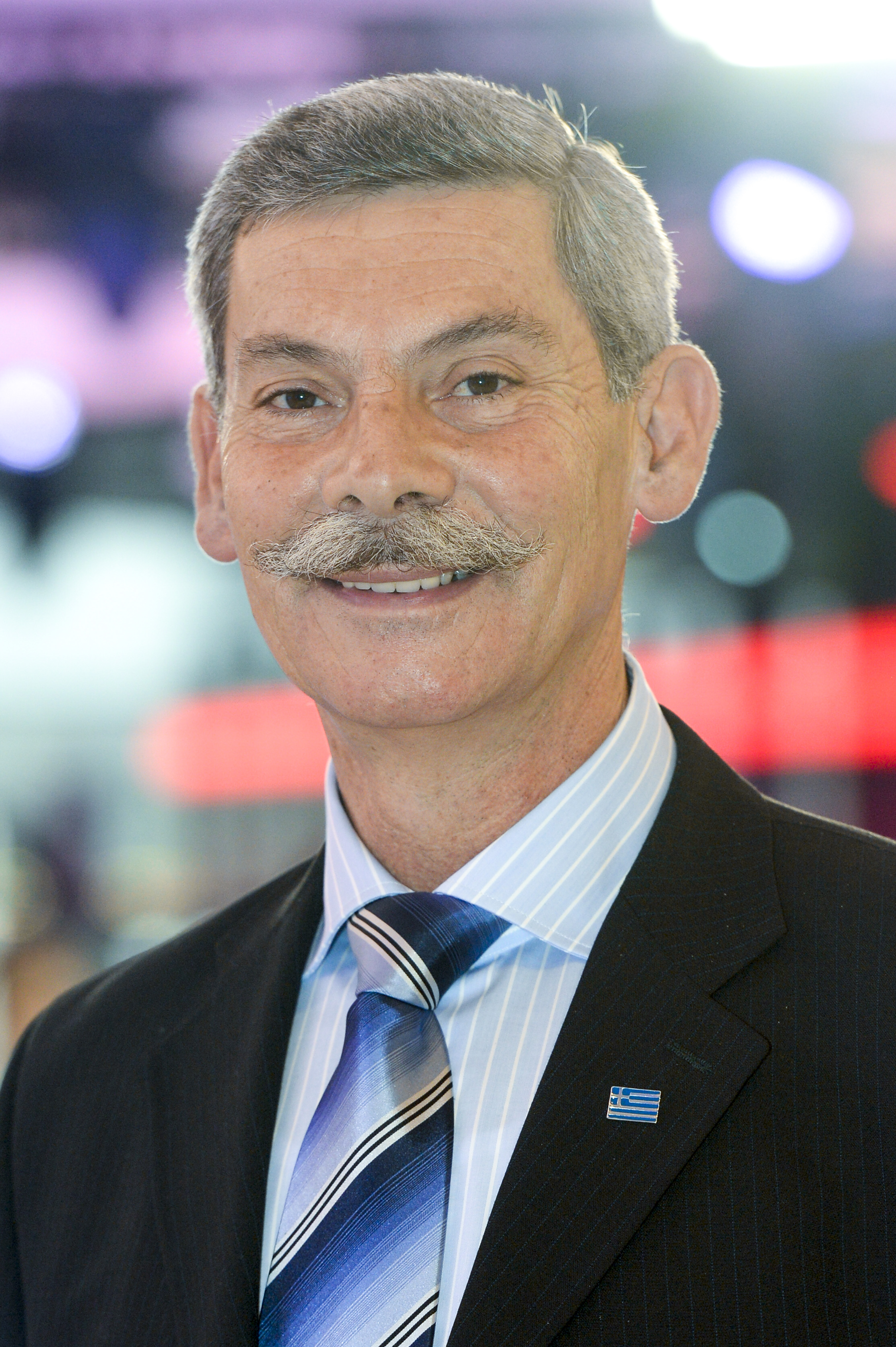
- Synadinos in 2014

Member of the European Parliament for Greece
- In office 2014–2019

Personal details
- Born: 6 July 1955 (age 70) Argos Orestiko, Greece
- Party: Patriotic Radical Union (2018–2022); Golden Dawn (2014–2018)

Eleftherios Synadinos (Greek: Ελευθέριος Συναδινός; born 6 July 1955) is a retired Greek army officer and politician.

== Biography ==
Synadinos was born in Argos Orestiko. He is a retired army officer. He advanced to the rank of Lieutenant General, commanding the Greek Army's special forces. He served in a variety of positions in NATO coordination bodies, and in the Greek forces opposed to the Turkish invasion of Cyprus.

He was elected Member of the European Parliament with the Greek Golden Dawn party in the 2014 European elections alongside fellow General Georgios Epitideios. He remained with the Golden Dawn party from 2014 until 21 April 2018, when he sat as an independent MEP.

On 9 March 2016, he was expelled from Plenary by the President of the European Parliament, Martin Schulz, for calling Turks “dirty and polluted” during a debate. Referencing article 165 of the European Parliament's rules of procedure, Schulz stated that Synadinos' sentence represented “a breach of the values of the EU”.

On 22 June 2018, in Thessaloniki, he announced the founding declaration of his new political party called Patriotic Radical Union. In the 2019 European elections, his party ran on a common ballot with the LAOS party. The list gathered 1.23% and as such it failed to elect any MEP.
