= Eighth European Parliament =

Session of the European Parliament from 2014 to 2019

8th European Parliament
- 1 July 2014 – 18 April 2019
- President (1st Half): Martin Schulz
- President (2nd Half): Antonio Tajani
- Commission: Juncker
- Political groups: EPP; S&D; ECR; ALDE; GUE-NGL; Greens/EFA; EFDD; ENF; NI
- MEPs: 751
- Elections: May 2014 (Union)
- Treaty of Lisbon (Note: The Treaties of Rome and Treaty of Maastricht as amended by the Treaty of Lisbon and all preceding amending treaties.)

The eighth European Parliament was elected in the 2014 elections and lasted until the 2019 elections.

== Major events ==

- 22–25 May 2014
  - Elections to the Eighth Parliament.
- 1 July 2014
  - First meeting (constitutive session) of the Eighth Parliament.
  - Martin Schulz is elected as President of the European Parliament.
  - Vice-presidents elections.
- 17 January 2017
  - Antonio Tajani is elected as President of the European Parliament.
- 18 January 2017
  - Vice-presidents elections.

== Activity ==
	2014	2015	2016	2017	2018	2019	Source
Reports							
Resolutions and positions							
Parliamentary questions							
Written declarations							

== Major resolutions and positions ==
Resolution/position number	Procedure number	Notes

== Committees ==
=== Summary ===
Type	Number	Sources	Notes
Standing committee			
Temporary committee			
Committee of enquiry			

=== Temporary committees ===
Code	Committee	Report	Sources

=== Committees of enquiry ===
Code	Committee	Report	Sources

== Delegations ==
Type	Number	Sources
Europe delegations		
Non-Europe delegations		
Ad-hoc delegations		

== Political groups ==
Group	Parties	Leader(s)	Est.	MEPs
European People's Party (EPP)	European People's Party (EPP); +1 unaffiliated national party; +4 independent politicians	Manfred Weber	2009	216
Progressive Alliance of Socialists and Democrats (S&D)	Party of European Socialists (PES); +3 unaffiliated national parties	Gianni Pittella	2009	185
European Conservatives and Reformists Group (ECR)	Alliance of Conservatives and Reformists in Europe (ACRE); European Christian Political Movement (ECPM); + 1 unaffiliated national party; + 2 independent politicians	Syed Kamall	2009	77
Alliance of Liberals and Democrats for Europe (ALDE)	Alliance of Liberals and Democrats for Europe (ALDE); European Democratic Party (EDP); + 5 unaffiliated national parties	Guy Verhofstadt	2004	69
European United Left–Nordic Green Left (GUE-NGL)	Party of the European Left (PEL); European Anti-Capitalist Left (EACL); Nordic Green Left Alliance (NGLA); Maintenant le Peuple (MLP); + 10 unaffiliated national parties	Gabi Zimmer	1995	52
Greens–European Free Alliance (Greens–EFA)	European Green Party (EGP); European Free Alliance (EFA); + 3 unaffiliated national parties; + 2 independent politicians	Rebecca Harms; Philippe Lamberts	1999	52
Europe of Freedom and Direct Democracy (EFDD)	Alliance for Direct Democracy in Europe (ADDE); + 1 unaffiliated national party; + 1 independent politician	Nigel Farage	2014	42
Europe of Nations and Freedom (ENF)	European Alliance for Freedom (EAF); Movement for a Europe of Nations and Freedom (MENF); + 2 unaffiliated national parties; + 2 independent politicians	Marine Le Pen; Marcel de Graaff	2015	36
Non-Inscrits (NI)	Alliance for Peace and Freedom (APF); Alliance of European National Movements (AENM); Initiative of Communist and Workers' Parties (INITIATIVE); +3 unaffiliated national parties; +4 independent politicians	N/A		20
Source for MEPs: Seats by Member State		Total		749

=== Members in groups by country ===
Political group Country	EPP	S&D	ECR	ALDE	GUE-NGL	Greens-EFA	EFDD	ENF	NI	MEPs	Vacant
Austria	5	5		1		3		4		18	
Belgium	4	4	4	6		2		1		21	
Bulgaria	7	4	2	4						17	
Croatia	5	2	1	2		1				11	
Cyprus	1	2	1		2					6	
Czech Republic	7	4	2	4	3		1			21	
Denmark	1	3	4	3	1	1				13	
Estonia	1	1		3		1				6	
Finland	3	2	2	4	1	1				13	
France	20	13		7	4	6	1	20	3	74	
Germany	34	27	6	4	8	13	1	1	2	96	
Greece	5	4	1		6				5	21	
Hungary	12	4				2			3	21	
Ireland	4	1	1	1	4					11	
Italy	15	31	2		3	1	15	6		73	
Latvia	4	1	1	1		1				8	
Lithuania	3	2	1	3		1	1			11	
Luxembourg	3	1		1		1				6	
Malta	3	3								6	
Netherlands	5	3	2	7	3	2		4		26	
Poland	22	5	19				1	2	2	51	
Portugal	8	8		1	4					21	
Romania	13	14	1	3				1		32	
Slovakia	6	4	3							13	
Slovenia	5	1		1		1				8	
Spain	17	14		8	11	4				54	
Sweden	4	6		3	1	4	2			20	
United Kingdom	2	20	19	1	1	6	20	1	3	73	
Total	219	188	71	68	51	52	44	36	20	751	

== Leadership ==
=== Presidents ===
Term	President (or candidate)	Group	State	Votes
1 July 2014 – 17 January 2017	Martin Schulz	PES	Germany	409
1 July 2014 – 17 January 2017	Sajjad Karim	ECR	United Kingdom	101
1 July 2014 – 17 January 2017	Pablo Iglesias Turrión	GUE-NGL	Spain	51
1 July 2014 – 17 January 2017	Ulrike Lunacek	Greens/EFA	Austria	51

Term	President (or candidate)	Group	State	Votes			
Term	President (or candidate)	Group	State	1st round	2nd round	3rd round	4th round
17 January 2017 –	Antonio Tajani	EPP	Italy	274	287	291	351
17 January 2017 –	Gianni Pittella	S&D	Italy	183	200	199	282
17 January 2017 –	Helga Stevens	ECR	Belgium	77	66	58	
17 January 2017 –	Jean Lambert	Greens–EFA	United Kingdom	56	51	53	
17 January 2017 –	Eleonora Forenza	GUE/NGL	Italy	50	42	45	
17 January 2017 –	Laurențiu Rebega	ENF	Romania	43	45	44	

=== Vice-Presidents ===
	Members	Group	State	Votes
1	Antonio Tajani	EPP	Italy	452, Round 1
2	Mairead McGuinness	EPP	(Republic of Ireland) Ireland	441, Round 1
3	Rainer Wieland	EPP	Germany	437, Round 1
4	Ramón Luis Valcárcel	EPP	Spain	406, Round 1
5	Ildikó Pelczné Gáll	EPP	Hungary	400, Round 1
6	Adina Vălean	EPP	Romania	394, Round 1
7	Corina Crețu	S&D	Romania	406, Round 2
8	Sylvie Guillaume	S&D	France	406, Round 2
9	David Sassoli	S&D	Italy	394, Round 2
10	Olli Rehn	ALDE	Finland	377, Round 3
11	Alexander Graf Lambsdorff	ALDE	Germany	365, Round 3
12	Ulrike Lunacek	Greens/EFA	Austria	319, Round 3
13	Dimitrios Papadimoulis	GUE/NGL	Greece	302, Round 3
14	Ryszard Czarnecki	ECR	Poland	284, Round 3

=== Quaestors ===
Name	Country	Party	Group
Élisabeth Morin	France	Union for a Popular Movement	EPP
Bogusław Liberadzki	Poland	Democratic Left Alliance	S&D
Catherine Bearder	United Kingdom	Liberal Democrats	ALDE
Andrey Kovatchev	Bulgaria	GERB	EPP
Karol Karski	Poland	Law and Justice	ECR

== Membership ==
After the 2014 election, the members formed seven groups with 52 independent members, mainly MEPs against the Union who failed to unify into a political group.

Apportionment

State	Seats	State	Seats	State	Seats	State	Seats
Germany	96	Netherlands	26	Austria	18	Lithuania	11
France	74	Belgium	21	Bulgaria	17	Latvia	8
Italy	73	Czech Republic	21	Denmark	13	Slovenia	8
United Kingdom	73	Greece	21	Finland	13	Cyprus	6
Spain	54	Hungary	21	Slovakia	13	Estonia	6
Poland	51	Portugal	21	Croatia	11	Luxembourg	6
Romania	32	Sweden	20	Ireland	11	Malta	6
Total							751
