= Andreas Mölzer =

Austrian politician (born 1952)

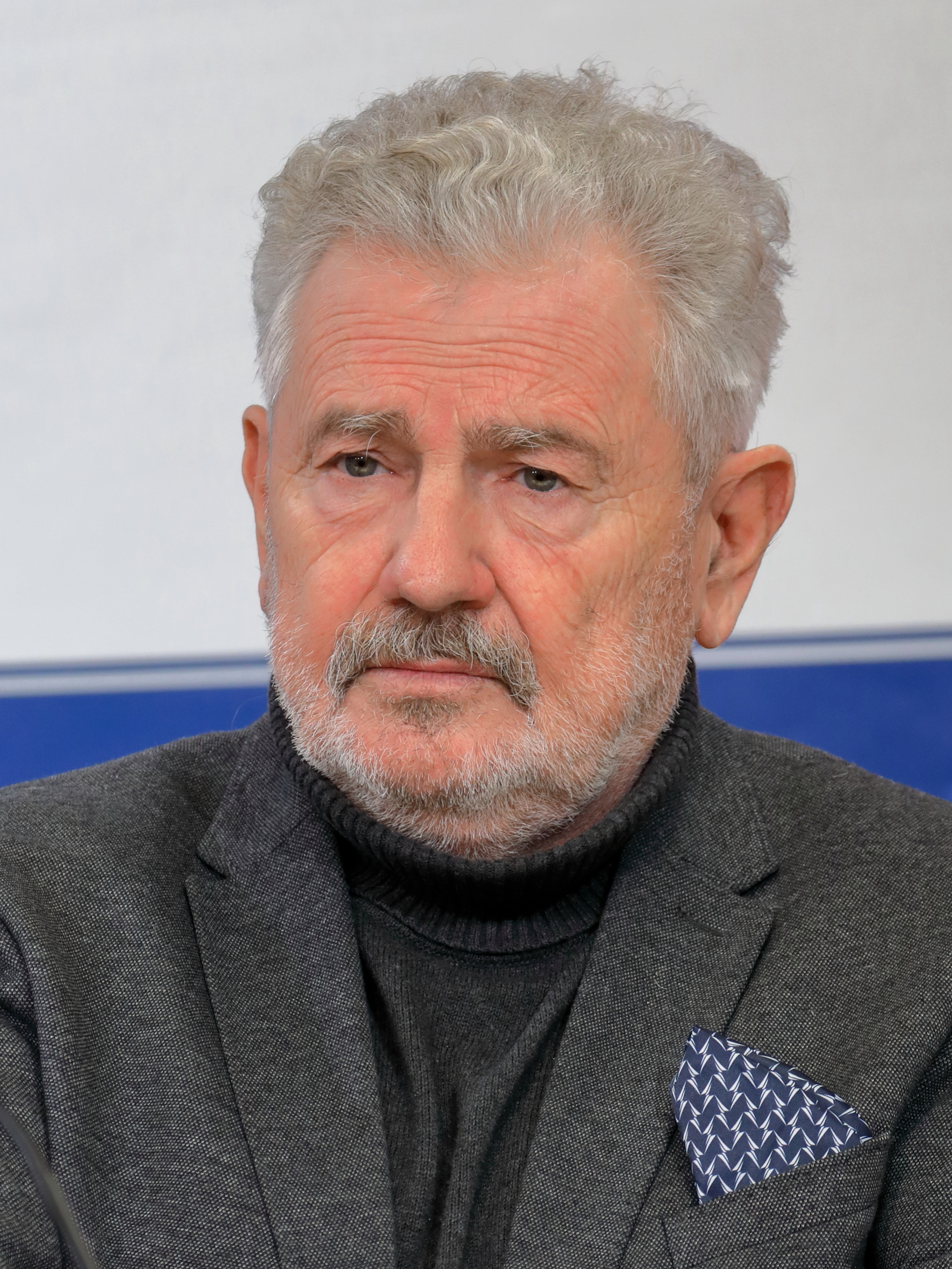
- Mölzer in 2019

Member of the European Parliament for Austria
- In office 2004–2014

Personal details
- Born: 2 December 1952 (age 73) Leoben, Styria, Austria
- Party: Freedom Party of Austria

Andreas Mölzer (born 2 December 1952) is an Austrian politician and former Member of the European Parliament for the Freedom Party of Austria.

== Biography ==
Born in Leoben, Styria, Andreas Mölzer is of Styrian origin and attended grammar school in Knittelfeld. After serving in the Austrian Army, he studied Law, History and Sociology at the Graz University. He became a member of a Student Corps. From 1979 to 1981 he was assistant at law departments. He left university in 1982 without graduating and became editor-in-chief of the Kärntner Nachrichten newspaper. From 1991 until 1994 he was an elected member of the Bundesrat and president of the Freedom Party's Academy.

From 1999 until 2002, Mölzer was cultural advisor of Jörg Haider, governor of Carinthia. In 2004, Mölzer was elected as the only MEP for the Freedom Party. In 2005, he was expelled from the Freedom Party for being a harsh critic of Jörg Haider and his faction, but was readmitted after Heinz-Christian Strache took over the party. Andreas Mölzer is married and has six children. He lives in Carinthia.

== Politics ==
Mölzer is a leading figure of the pan-German wing of the Freedom Party. He defines himself as a "cultural German" and often publishes articles in the Junge Freiheit.

In the European Parliament, Mölzer is known for trying to create a network of right-wing-MEPs, including the French Front National, the Italian Fiamma Tricolore and others. The formation of the Identity, Tradition, Sovereignty group was an effect of his efforts. he was Deputy Leader of the group. He sat on its Committee on Constitutional Affairs, and was a substitute for the Committee on Culture and Education and a member of the Delegation to the EU-Turkey Joint Parliamentary Committee.

In April 2014, Mölzer pulled out of the European elections over controversy sparked by remarks he made at a party meeting.

== Media ==
Mölzer has been publishing in the Die Presse and the Kronen Zeitung, Austria's leading tabloid, since 1998. Since 1997, he is editor-in-chief of the right-wing-weekly Zur Zeit, which is seen as Austrian pendant to Germany's Junge Freiheit, for which Mölzer contributes an article on European Affairs every week. He has also been writing and editing several books on political or history topics.

Mölzer has published several lyrical and prosaical works. His lyrics (Earth-brown tides / roll crowding / mightily through the country) is interpreted in a political context. However, it is said that the situation depicted in the poem could have been avoided. His novel Der Graue was criticized as it became subject of a public debate in 2014. This novel tells the tale of a survivor of a nuclear war who wanders and rapes through an apocalyptic landscape. The daily newspaper Kurier called the novel as "crazed fantasy of violence" and summarised its ending as follows: "From a folkish perspective, everything in the gray finds its happy ending: the aryan finds his female, saves the species - and is allowed to die."

== See also ==
- 2004 European Parliament election in Austria
