= Franz Obermayr =

Austrian politician

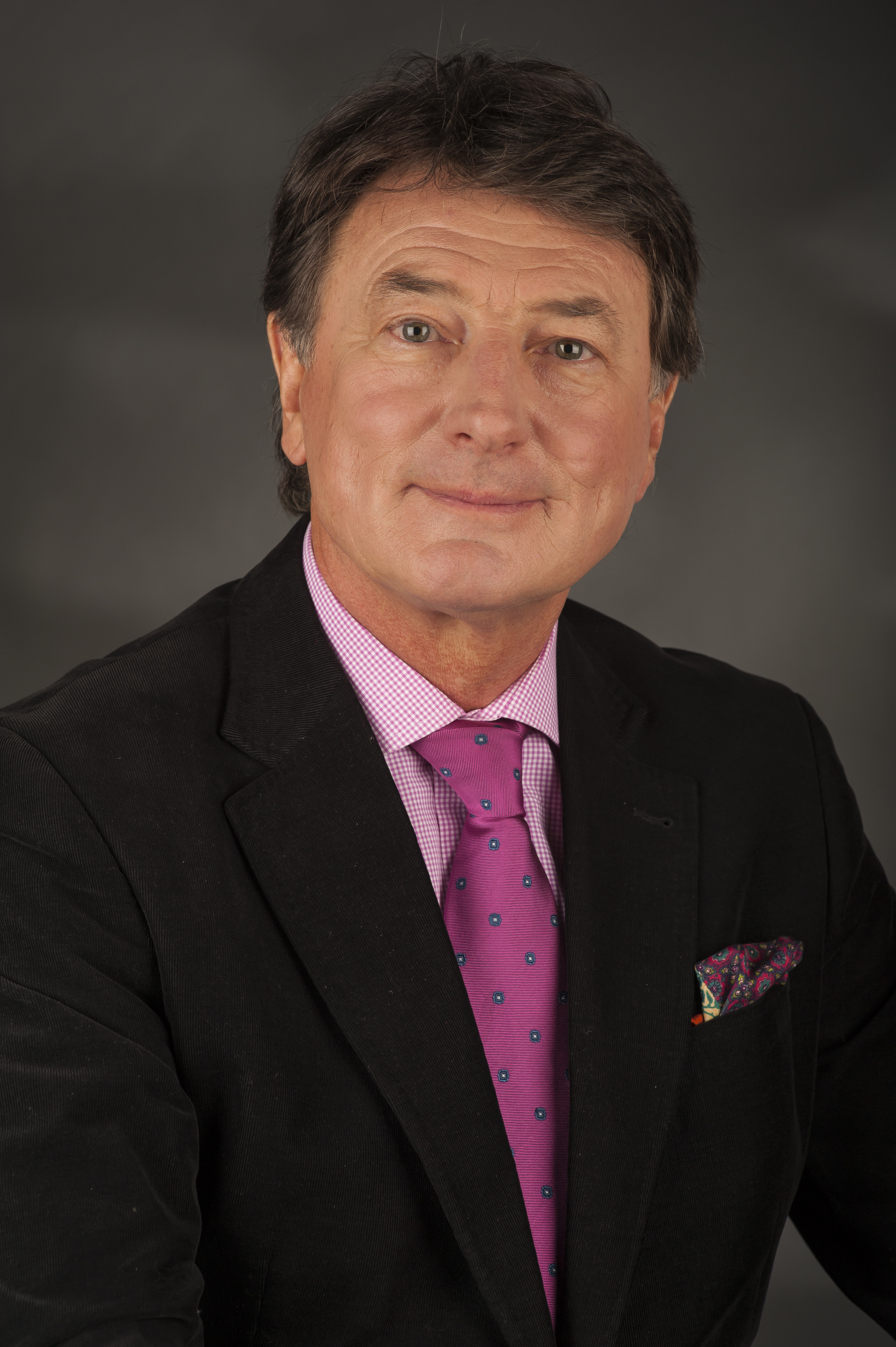

President of the European Alliance for Freedom
- In office 7 November 2012 – 15 June 2015
- Preceded by: Godfrey Bloom
- Succeeded by: Office abolished

Member of the European Parliament
- In office 1 July 2009 – 24 May 2019
- Constituency: Austria

Personal details
- Born: Franz Sebastian Obermayr; 25 May 1952 (age 74) Linz, Austria
- Party: Freedom Party
- Education: University of Vienna

Video-Introduction

Franz Sebastian Obermayr (born 25 May 1952) is an Austrian politician who served as a Member of the European Parliament (MEP) from 2009 to 2019. He was the President of the European Alliance for Freedom from 2012 to 2015.
