= Krisztina Morvai =

Hungarian politician

Krisztina Morvai MEP
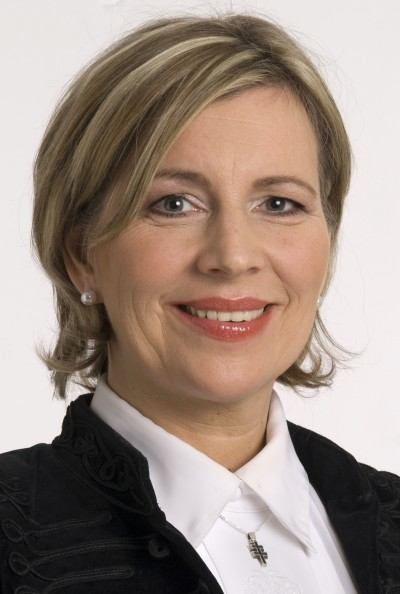
- Krisztina Morvai in 2009

Member of the European Parliament
- In office 14 July 2009 – 1 July 2019

Personal details
- Born: 22 June 1963 (age 63) Budapest, Hungary
- Party: Elected on Jobbik ticket
- Spouse: György Baló (until 2011)
- Children: Vera; Sára; Lili
- Education: Eötvös Loránd University; King's College London
- Occupation: Politician, jurist

Krisztina Morvai (born 22 June 1963) is a Hungarian jurist and nationalist politician. She was a Member of the European Parliament (MEP), having been elected on the list of the political party Jobbik – Movement for a Better Hungary – in the 2009 European Parliament elections. She was re-elected in 2014. Morvai is not a member of Jobbik, and later supported Fidesz.

== Early life and education ==
Morvai was born in Budapest in 1963 to Klári Fekete and Miklós Morvai. After graduating from ELTE Apáczai Csere János High School, she went to the Faculty of Law of the Eötvös Loránd University of Budapest, getting a law degree cum laude. After graduation she gained qualifications to practice as a judge in Hungary, but instead of working in that capacity she went on to teach at the university, currently as an associate professor.

In 1989, she was the first recipient of a British Government scholarship for students in central Europe and was presented with her award by UK Prime Minister Margaret Thatcher personally. She used the scholarship to study advanced law at King's College London, gaining a Master of Laws degree. From 1993 to 1994, she taught law in the United States at the University of Wisconsin–Madison as a Fulbright scholar.

Her primary research area was penal law, dealing with the retrospective administration of justice, the question of abortion, victim's rights in criminal procedure, the dignity and rights of the HIV positive, child abuse and sexual exploitation, the problem of prostitution, discrimination and domestic violence. She wrote a book on domestic violence, Terror a családban (Terror in the family).

== Career ==
In the 1990s, Morvai worked for the European Commission of Human Rights and between 2003 and 2006 she was a member of the Women's Anti-discrimination Committee of the United Nations. In the UN Women's Rights Committee, Morvai conducted research into what she called the "inhumane living conditions" of Palestinian women, which resulted in a complaint being filed against her by the Israeli government. In 2006, after she was removed from her UN position, she complained that this was due to Israeli political pressure which resulted in her losing her seat and being replaced by a Hungarian Jewish woman, Andrea Pető, whom she described as "a well-known Zionist activist". Pető, actually an activist of the feminist, Jewish traditionalist cultural foundation Esztertáska, did not receive the necessary votes to be confirmed to the committee.

In March 2009 the Jewish Telegraphic Agency cited a report in a German weekly called Jungle World, according to which Morvai "advised" the "liberal-bolshevik Zionists" to "start thinking of where to flee and where to hide" in a 2008 speech. Morvai was further criticized for alleged anti-Semitism for a letter addressed to the editors of the prestigious Hungarian literary weekly Élet és Irodalom in which she referred to the community to which the author of the article she was responding to belonged as "his type" or "their type", while never actually using the words "Jew" or "Jewish". In February 2009, Morvai objected to Israel's offensive in the Gaza Strip and called it a "mass murder" and "genocide" of the Palestinian people and in an open letter to the Israeli ambassador to Hungary wrote that Israel held itself above the law and that its leaders would be imprisoned for their actions in Gaza, she continued, "The only way to talk to people like you is by assuming the style of Hamas. I wish all of you lice-infested, dirty murderers will receive Hamas' 'kisses.'" In November 2009, Palestinian Return Centre, a pro-Palestinian advocacy organisation, withdrew Morvai's invitation to a London conference in support of Palestine.

Morvai had come to international attention several times over various human rights issues. After announcing her candidacy for the European elections, Morvai became a focus of attention for the media, shunning interviews with the United Kingdom press in light of what she saw as biased attacks. During the election campaign, Morvai said that if Jobbik entered parliament, it would join “one of the eurosceptic factions which will only form in the light of the election results”. On 7 June 2009, Morvai was elected MEP (Member of the European Parliament) along with two of her colleagues on the Jobbik ticket. After the election Morvai stated that despite the large amount of defamation Jobbik was calling on its political opponents to come together and cooperate to achieve the goals of the country. Her then-husband György Baló was not given his usual role of leading the election coverage to avoid accusations of bias.

Morvai has been called antisemitic by Haaretz, especially after her statement that "so-called proud Hungarian Jews should go back to playing with their tiny little circumcised tails.", written in a public forum to an American-Hungarian Jew living in New York, Gábor Barat.

Morvai wrote an open letter to Eleni Tsakopoulos Kounalakis, United States Ambassador to Hungary, on the occasion that the ambassador visited the headquarters of three parties but not that of the Jobbik, on the night of the 2010 general election. This was answered by Richard Field, an American businessman living in Hungary, the main financial supporter of the party Politics Can Be Different.

== Personal life ==
She was married to Hungarian TV presenter, journalist György Baló; the couple divorced in 2011. They have two daughters, twins Vera and Sára. Morvai has another daughter, Lili, from her early relationship.

== Books and articles ==
- Gender Discrimination – Related Cases Before the European Commission and Court of Human Rights. = Promoting Human Rights and Civil Society in Central and Eastern Europe. 1995.
- What is Missing the Rhetoric of Choice? UCLA Women’s Law Journal. 1995.
- Magánügy-e a feleségbántalmazás? Belügyi Szemle. 1998/3. 55-71.
- Terror a családban. A feleségbántalmazás és a jog. Budapest, Kossuth Kiadó, 1998.
- KITTI Rettegés és erőszak – otthon Rejtjel Kiadó. – ISBN 963-7255-09-5
