= Laurențiu Rebega =

Romanian politician

Laurențiu Constantin Rebega MEP
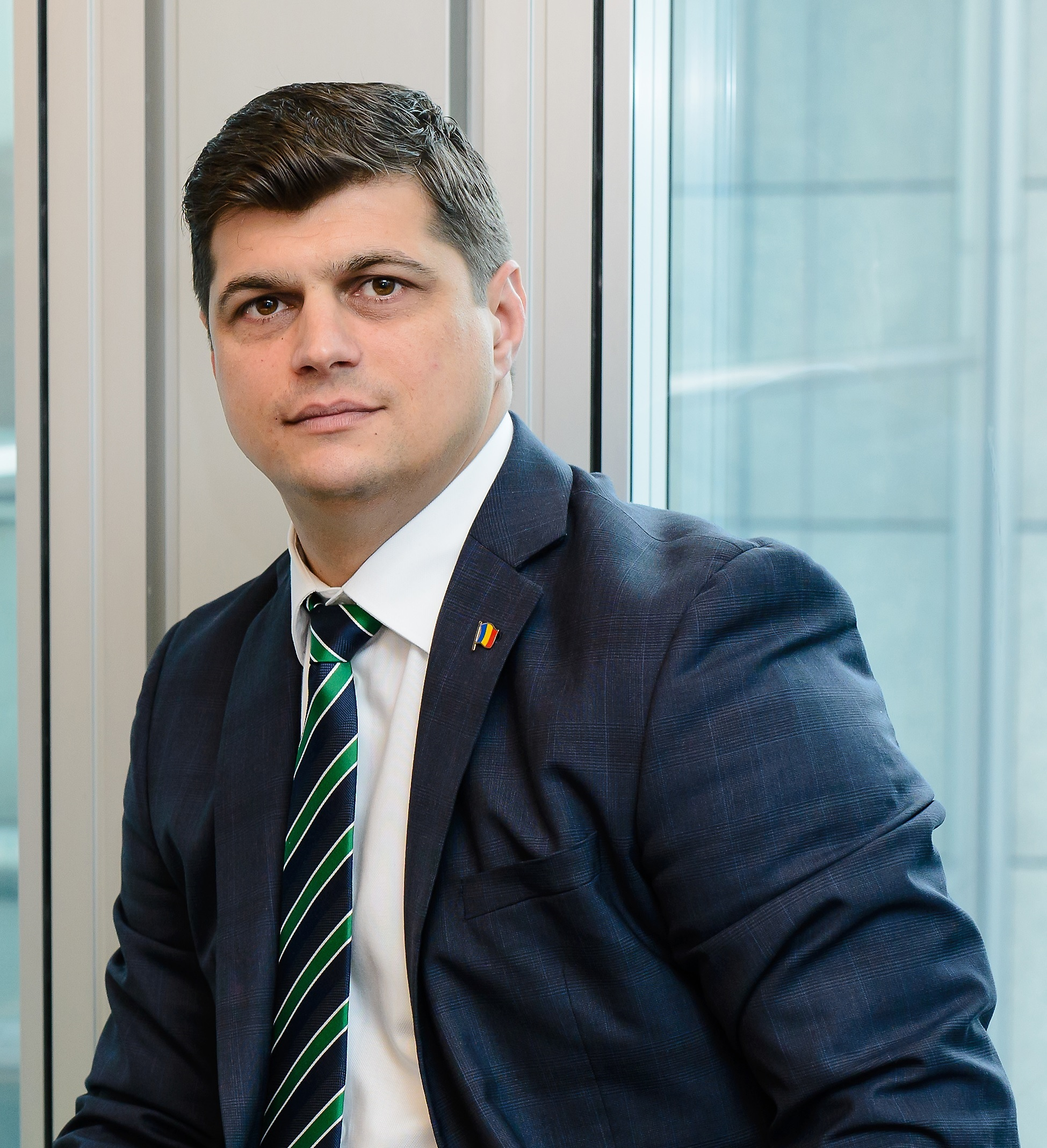

Member of the European Parliament for Romania
- Incumbent
- Assumed office May 2014

Personal details
- Born: 20 February 1976 (age 50) Vălenii de Munte, Prahova County, Romania
- Party: PRO Romania party
- Other political affiliations: Romanian Conservative Party (2010–2015)
- Education: USAMV, Bucharest, Romania
- Occupation: Politician
- Profession: Engineer
- Website: www.laurentiurebega.ro

Laurențiu Constantin Rebega (born 20 February 1976) is a Romanian politician and since 2014, a member of the European Parliament (MEP).

In the European Parliament, Laurentiu Rebega is a full member of the Committee on Agriculture and Rural Development (COMAGRI) and the Committee on Petitions (PETI) and a substitute in the European Parliament Committee on Foreign Affairs (AFET), Committee on Industry, Research and Energy (ITRE) and Committee on Regional Development (REGI). He is also a member of the Delegation to the EU-Turkey Joint Parliamentary Committee. He is a member of the European Conservatives and Reformists Group (ECR).

== Education ==
In 2004, Laurentiu Rebega received his bachelor's degree from the Zootechnology faculty of the University of Agronomic Sciences and Veterinary Medicine (USAMV), the Zootechnology faculty, in Bucharest Romania. As a student, he has been involved in various student organizations and student related activities. For example, he was the representative of the Student League at USAMV in Bucharest, the president of the Sports Association Agronomia and the editor in chief at Impact studentesc magazine. In 2003, he took the course Young farmers offered by Grindsted Agricultural College in Denmark. After graduation from USAMV, he got back to Denmark, at the Grindsted Agricultural College where he enrolled for Junior Leaders in Agricultural Business, a 2-year programme. Therefore, between 2004 and 2006, he studied and worked on projects in the field of agricultural management. Between 2007 and 2009, he enrolled for an MA degree in Management and Rural Development at the University of Agronomic Sciences and Veterinary Medicine in Bucharest. Between 2009 and 2011, he studied Rural and Regional Development Project Management at the Bucharest Academy of Economic Studies, from where he received his second MA degree. In 2012, he attended the short-term course on Foreign Policy and Diplomacy offered by the Diplomatic Institute of Romania. He graduated International Politics, an MA programme offered by the Centre Européen de Recherches Internationales et Stratégiques, a post-graduate school that provides education designed for professionals.

== Career ==
Between 2004 and 2006, Laurentiu Rebega worked in Denmark as a junior agricultural engineer. After his return to Romania, he worked in Bucharest as an agricultural engineer for ISPIF, then he was recruited as an expert in logistics by ADT Projekt. Afterwards, he became a production director for the company JD Agro Cocora and a GM for SC Semina SA. He also worked as a consultant for the department of agriculture at SDC Agro Seed SRL. In 2010, he chose to join the Conservative Party's Prahova county local branch where he very soon became president. In 2012, following the local elections in Romania, Laurentiu Rebega secured a mandate as a county counsellor. Then, he was elected vice-president of the Prahova County Council. In 2014, he became the vice-president of the Conservative Party at a national level and the coordinator of the Agriculture and Rural Development Department. Starting from October 2018 he is Vicepresident of the PRO Romania party.

== At the European Parliament ==
In 2014, as a candidate of the PSD-PC-UNPR party coalition, he ran for the European Parliament elections organized at the end of May 2014. At 38 years old, he has become one of the 32 Romanian members of the European Parliament. Until June 2015, he was a member of Progressive Alliance of Socialists and Democrats, one of the 8 political groups at the EP. For one year, during June 2014 and June 2015, he was a member of the Committee on Agriculture and Rural Development (COMAGRI) and the Committee on Petitions (PETI) and a substitute in the Committee for Fisheries (PECH). He was also a member in the Delegation to the EU-Armenia and EU-Azerbaijan Parliamentary Cooperation Committees and the EU-Georgia Parliamentary Association Committee. In January 2015, he resigned from the Romanian Conservative Party and thus, became a politically independent Member of the European Parliament. A couple of months later, in June 2015, he left the S&D group at the EP and joined the newly formed political group, the Europe of Nations and Freedom (ENF). On 1 March 2018, Laurențiu Rebega left the ENF Group and became an independent Member of the European Parliament. Starting from April 2018 he became a member of the European Conservatives and Reformists Group (ECR). Since June 2015, Rebega has been a substitute in the Committee on Foreign Affairs (AFET), Committee on Industry, Research and Energy (ITRE) and Committee on Regional Development (REGI) and became a member of the Delegation to the EU-Turkey Joint Parliamentary Committee.

On his personal website, Laurentiu Rebega highlights that his entire ideological and participatory activity stands up for individual liberties, national sovereignty and the protection of the freedom of expression in all its forms. Rebega expresses his unconditional patriotism and loyalty for national values and Romania's unitary state principles.

"I firmly believe that the good of one nation does not necessary mean the bad of the other, therefore my patriotic and nationalist beliefs will always be part of my political actions. I will stand up for national ideals, history, traditions, Christianity and inherited customs and I will actively participate in the process of Romanian values’ recognition at a European and global level. I am and I will always be the one who follows the rightful aspirations of the Romanian revolution from 1848, namely the territorial unity, the spirit of emancipation and affirmation of the Romanian nation, its just, national harmony.My activity is based on the defense of Romania's territorial integrity and national sovereignty, the support of Christianity, in general and the Orthodox faith, in particular, the protection of individual liberties, with a focus on the freedom of speech."

Rebega is a strong supporter of the unification of the Republic of Moldova with Romania.

Laurențiu Rebega is the first Romanian in the EU history who run for elections in one of the European institutions. During the elections held on 17 January 2017, Laurențiu Rebega was amongst the seven candidates for the presidency of the European Parliament.

== Books ==
"Terorism și Contra-terorism în UE: lecții din trecut" - book published in 2017 at Mica Valahie publishing house, ISBN 978-606-738-067-5 written in Romanian

"Terrorism and Counter-terrorism in the EU: Lessons from the past" -book published in 2017 at Mica Valahie publishing house, ISBN 978-606-738-066-8, written in English

"Romania from Romania and Romania from the European Union" - book published in 2018 at Mica Valahie publishing house, ISBN 978-606-738-069-9 written in Romanian

== Personal life ==
Laurentiu Rebega is married and has two daughters.
