= 2014 European Parliament election =

- 22–25 May 2014

All 751 seats in the European Parliament 376 seats needed for a majority
- Turnout: 163,551,013 (42.54% ▼0.7 pp)
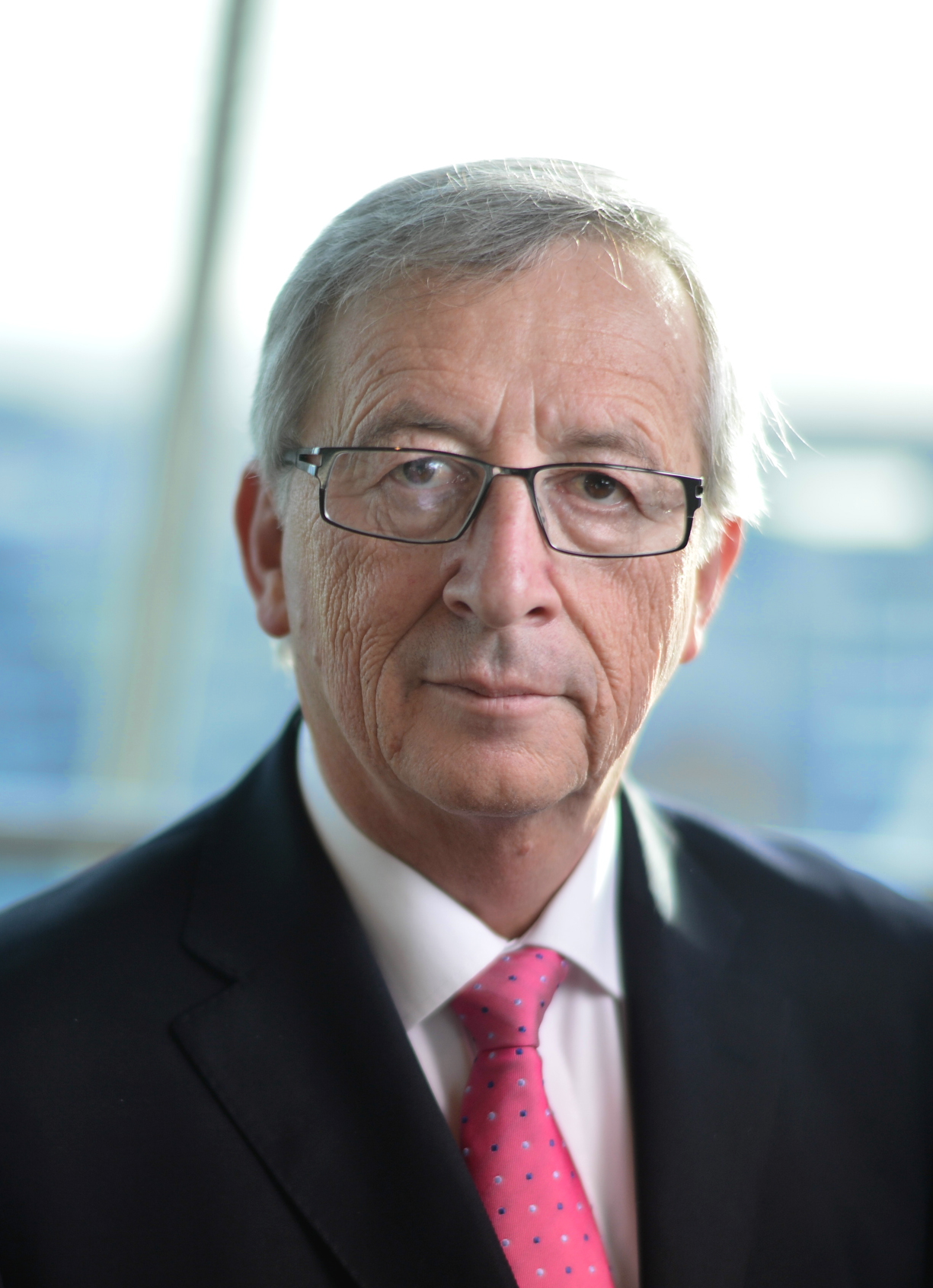

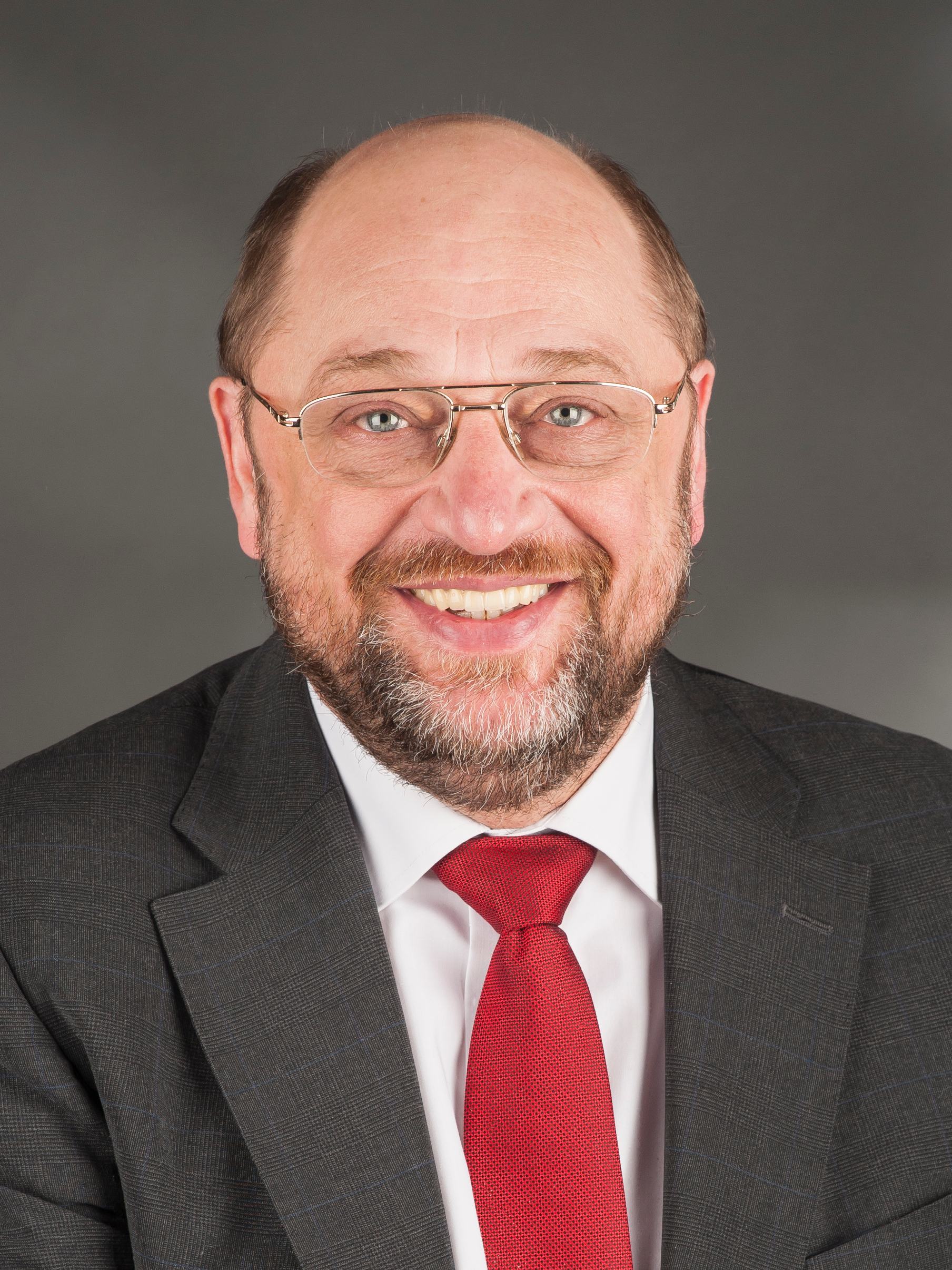

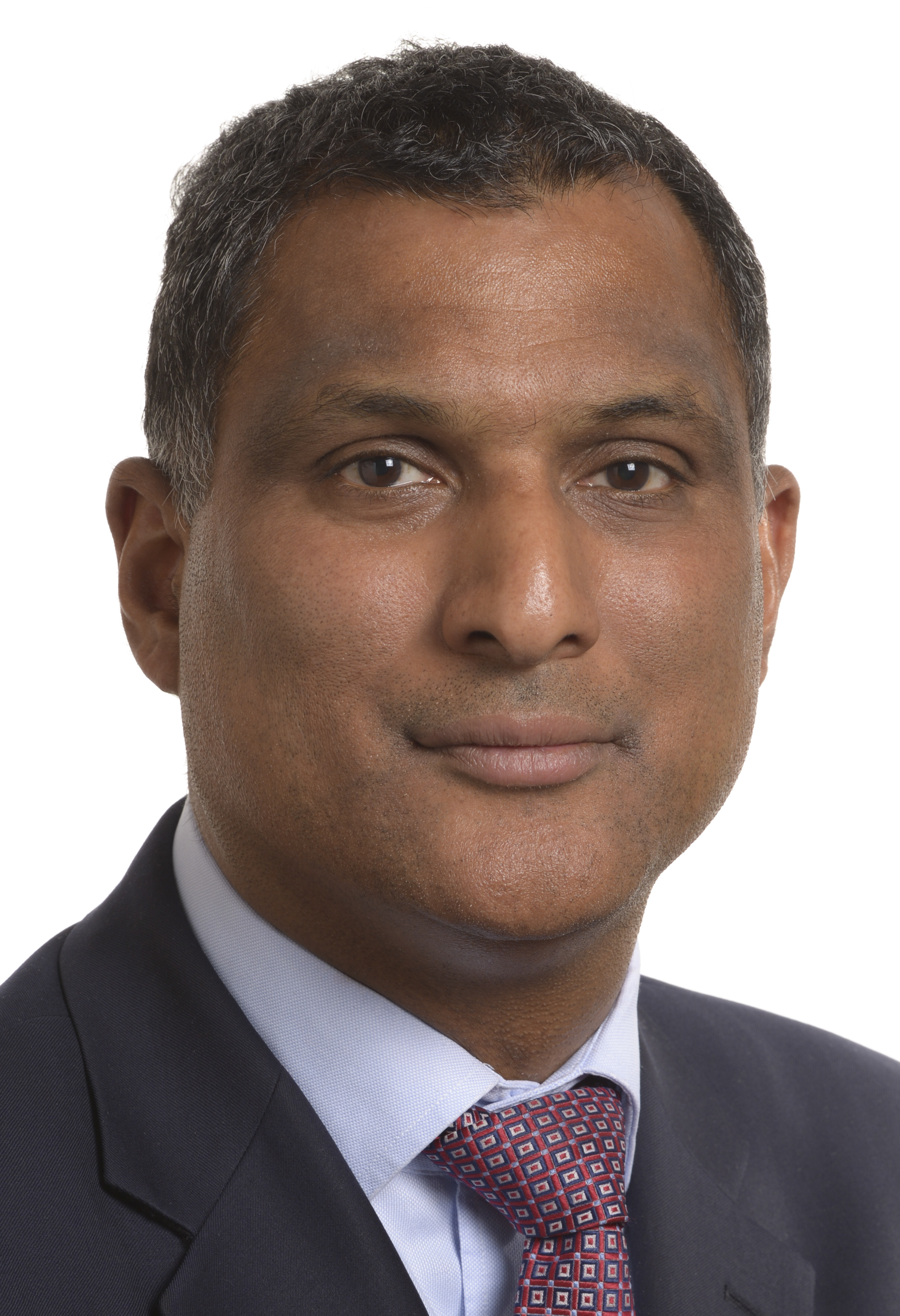

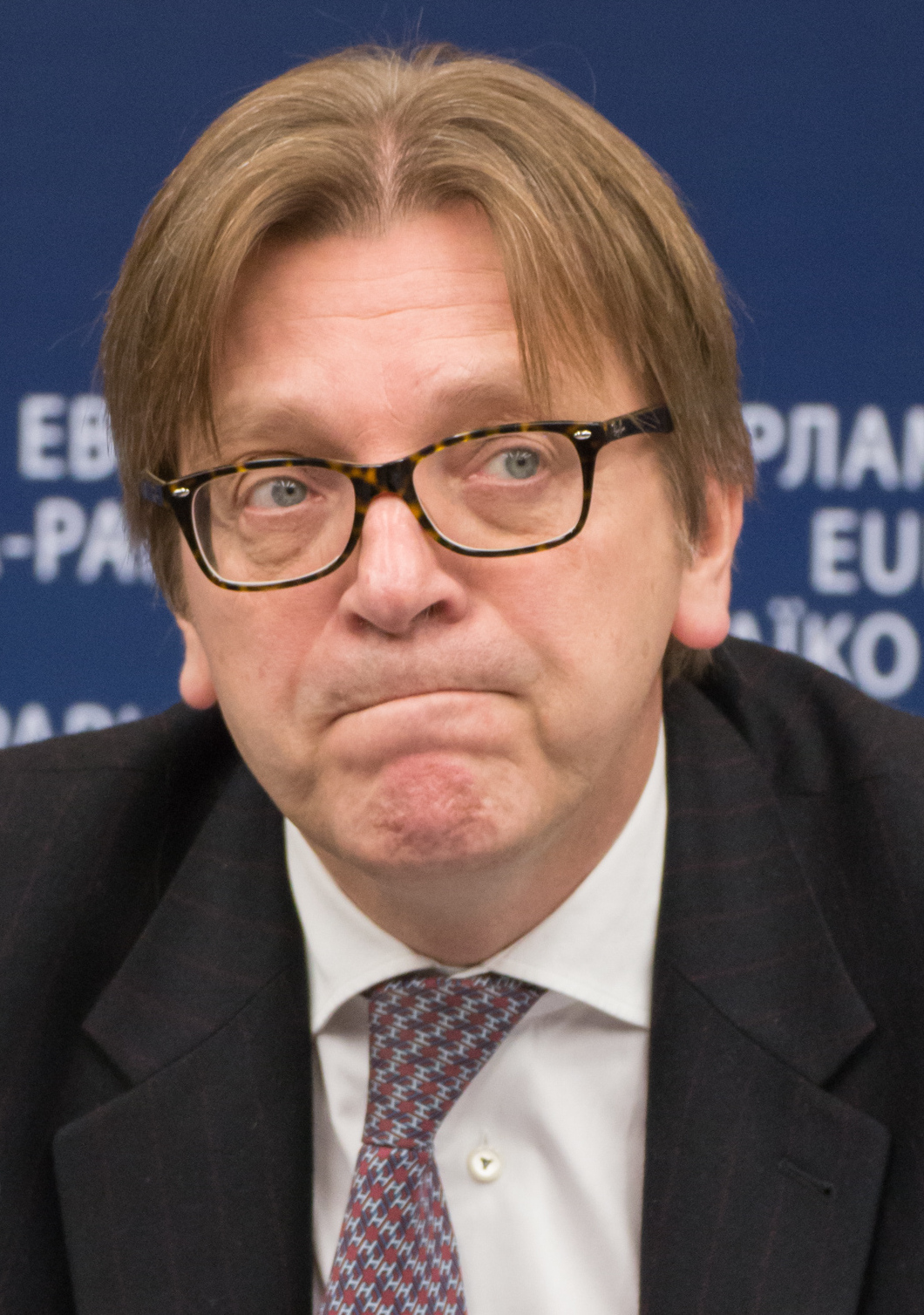

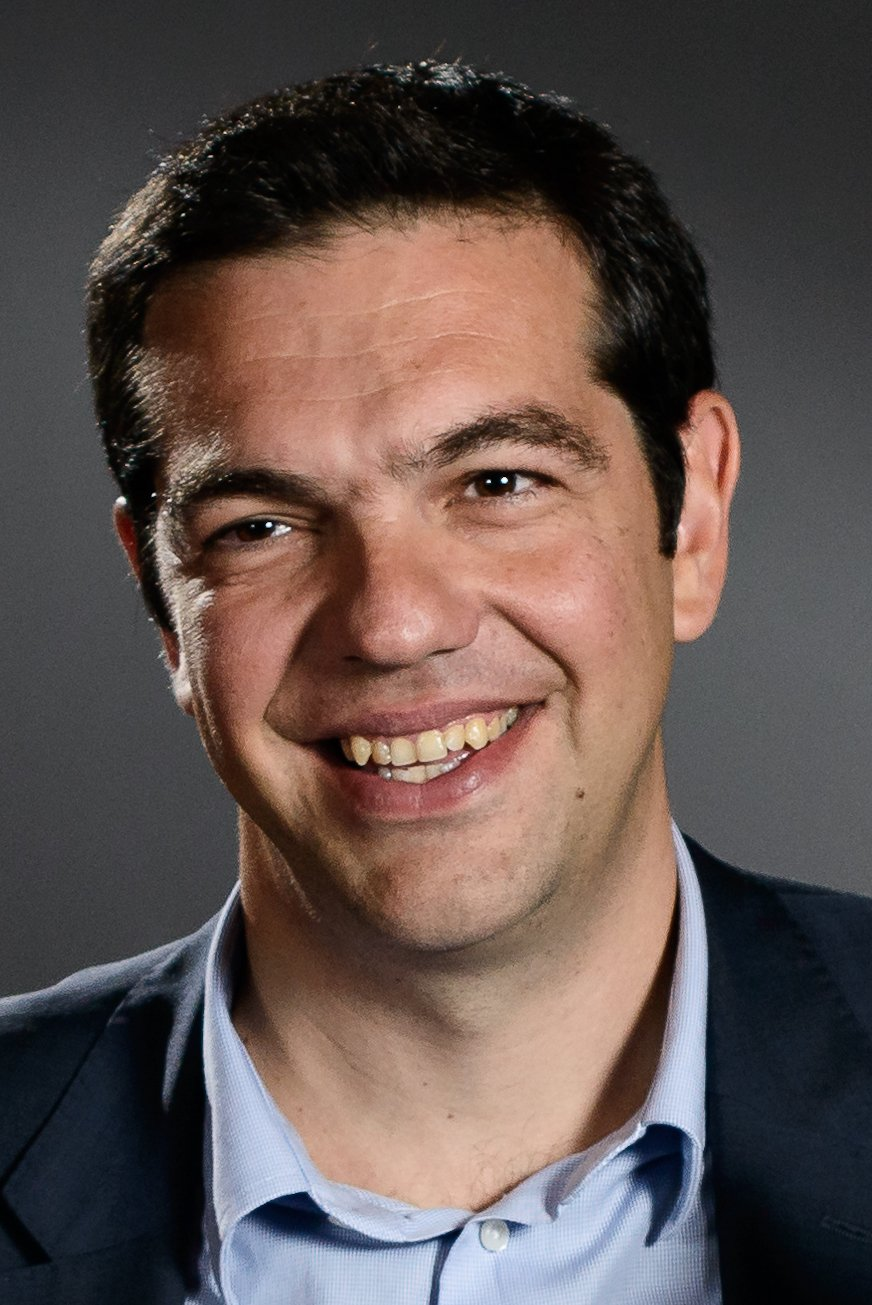

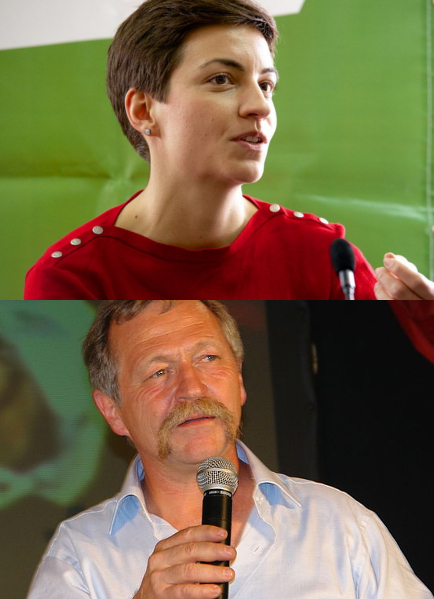

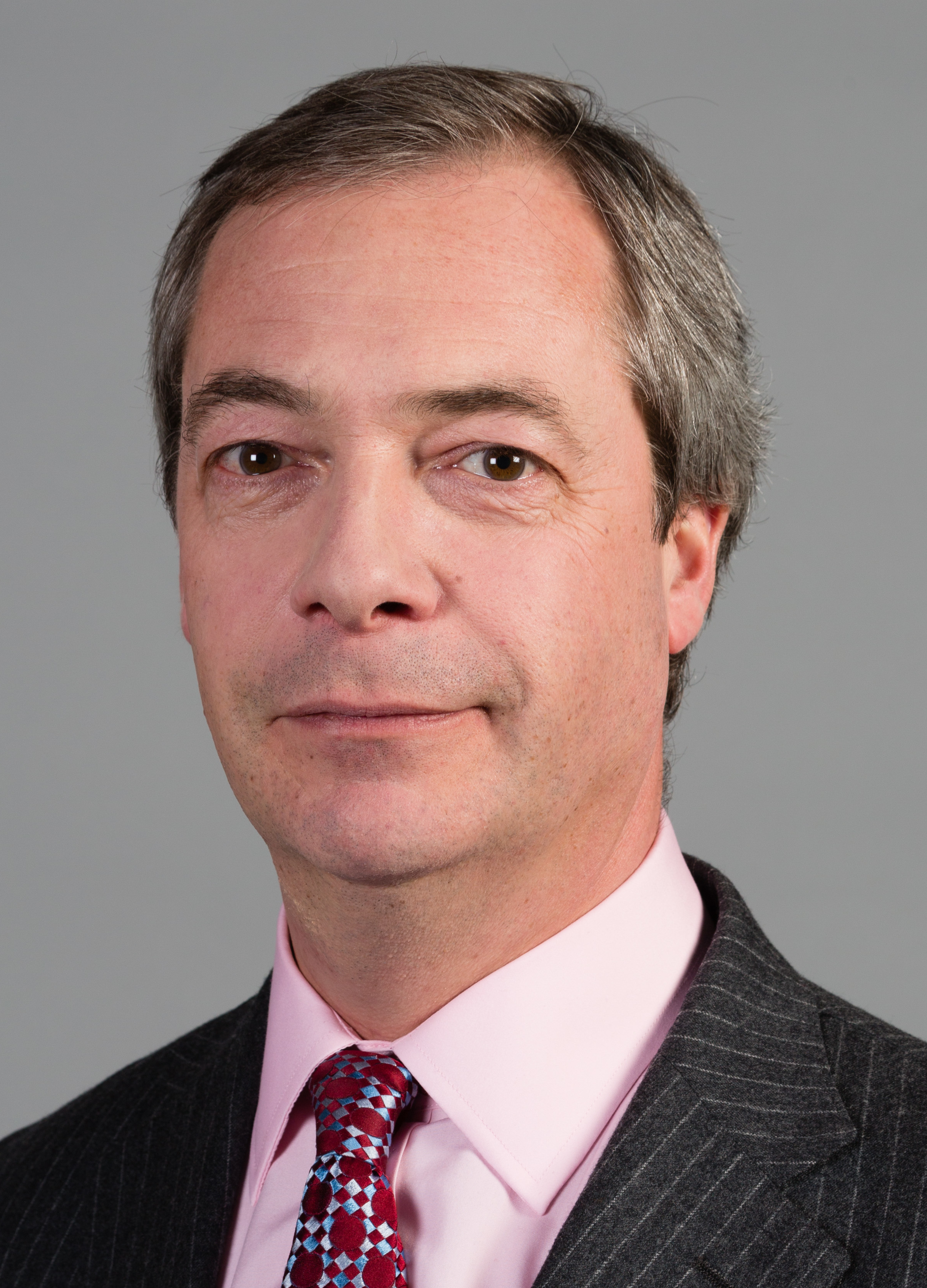

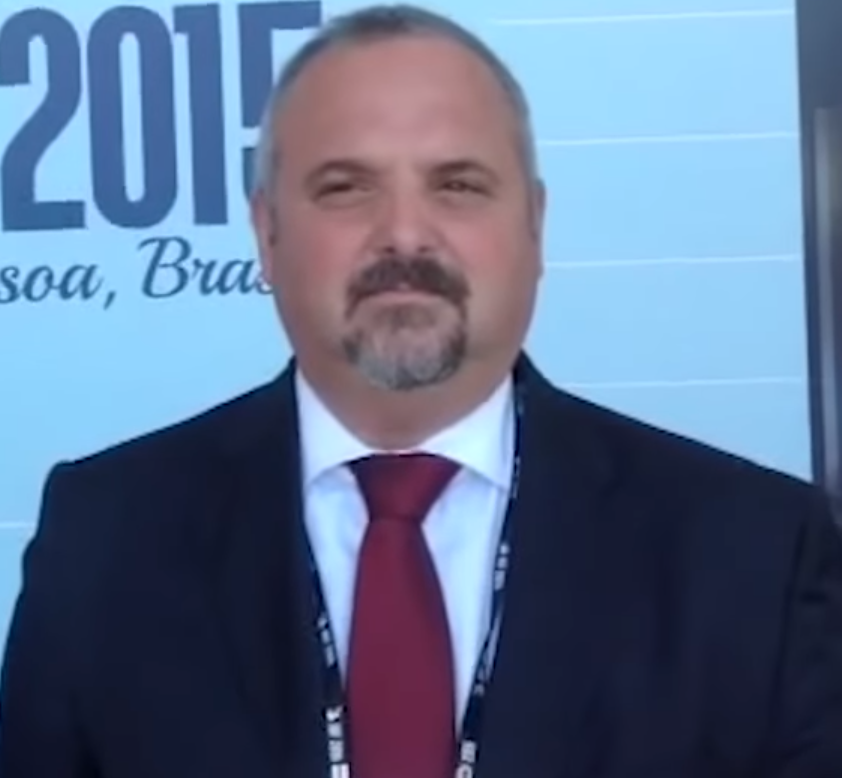
Leader	Jean-Claude Juncker	Martin Schulz	Syed Kamall
Alliance	EPP	S&D	ECR
Leader's seat	Luxembourg (Note: Not running for a European Parliament seat)	Germany	London
Last election	265 (36%)	183 (25%)	54 (7.3%)
Seats before	274	183	57
Seats won	221	185	45
Seats after	221 (29.4%)	191 (25.4%)	70 (9.3%)
Seat change	▼44	▲8	▲16
Popular vote	38,610,376	40,202,068	8,612,168
Percentage	23.8%	24.4%	5.2%
Swing	▼6.6%	▲0.4%	▲2.0%
Leader	Guy Verhofstadt	Alexis Tsipras	Ska Keller; José Bové
Alliance	ALDE	GUE/NGL	Greens/EFA
Leader's seat	Belgium (Dutch)	Greece	Germany; France
Last election	84 (11.4%)	35 (4.8%)	55 (7.5%)
Seats before	83	35	58
Seats won	59	45	47
Seats after	67 (8.9%)	52 (6.9%)	50 (6.7%)
Seat change	▼16	▲17	▼5
Popular vote	11,652,405	9,243,548	12,058,475
Percentage	7.0%	5.6%	7.3%
Swing	▼2.5%	▲2.1%	▼0.8%
Leader	Nigel Farage & David Borrelli
Alliance	EFDD
Leader's seat	South East England; North-East Italy
Last election	32 (4.3%)
Seats before	31
Seats won	38
Seats after	48 (6.4%)
Seat change	▲16
Popular vote	10,830,339
Percentage	6.6%
Swing	▲2.1%
- Post-election composition of each member state's delegation
President of the European Commission before election
José Manuel Barroso
EPP
President of the European Commission after election
Jean-Claude Juncker
EPP

The 2014 European Parliament election was held in the European Union (EU) between 22 and 25 May 2014. It was the 8th parliamentary election since the first direct elections in 1979, and the first in which the European political parties fielded candidates for President of the Commission.

The candidates, sometimes referred to by the German term Spitzenkandidaten (English: top candidates), were Jean-Claude Juncker for the European People's Party, Martin Schulz for the Party of European Socialists, Guy Verhofstadt for the Alliance of Liberals and Democrats for Europe Party, Ska Keller and José Bové jointly for the European Green Party and Alexis Tsipras for the Party of the European Left. The Alliance of European Conservatives and Reformists and the European Alliance for Freedom declined to nominate candidates.

While the European People's Party lost ground to the Progressive Alliance of Socialists and Democrats, it remained the largest faction in the new Parliament, resulting in the EPP's nomination of Jean-Claude Juncker as Commission President at the European Council. In turn, the European Council accepted the nomination by a simple majority (only David Cameron and Viktor Orban voted against Juncker).

== Background ==
The Council of the European Union decided to hold the 2014 elections in late May instead of early June as had been the case with previous EP elections. The elections were brought forward to provide more time for the election of a president of the European Commission, and because they would otherwise have coincided with the Pentecost weekend which falls during school holidays in many member states.

The ongoing Eurozone crisis, an offshoot of the Great Recession, started several months after the last Parliament election in June 2009. Although it affected most EU member states, the hardest-hit economies were those of southern Europe: Greece, Cyprus, Italy, Spain, and Portugal, along with Ireland. Among other reasons, harsh austerity measures significantly affected the public approval of EU leadership. The percentage of Greeks approving the EU leadership decreased from 32% in 2010 to 19% in 2013, while in Spain, the approval dwindled more than a half from 59% in 2008 to 27% in 2013. Overall, only four of the 27 members countries approved the EU leadership. Peter S. Goodman suggests that "distrust about the treaties and conventions that hold together modern Europe appear at an all-time high." "Europe's establishment parties are widely expected to suffer their worst performance" since 1979, with the three mainstream parties (EPP, PES, ALDE) expected to collectively gain 63% of the vote, a 10% loss since 2009.

The Economist estimated in January 2014 that "anti-EU populists of the left and right could take between 16% and 25% of the parliament's seats, up from 12% today." Euromoney predicted "anti-EU populists and nationalists" winning around 150 seats in the parliament, almost 20% of the total. A Policy Network article from February 2014 suggested that despite the media focus on anti-EU parties, they "will undoubtedly remain modest compared to" other mainstream parties, but "their growth and their intentions to cooperate, signify important changes for the EU and European politics." In several countries, far-right and right-wing populist parties were expected to be in contention to poll the most votes in this election, including parties in Austria (Freedom Party), Denmark (People's Party), France (National Front), the Netherlands (Party for Freedom), and the UK (UKIP). In Greece, the left-wing Coalition of the Radical Left (SYRIZA) consistently led the polling in the leadup to the election. In Italy the populist and anti-establishment Five Star Movement, according to the polls, was expected to be the second most popular party after the Democratic Party, with about 25% of votes.

In January 2014, José Manuel Barroso, President of the European Commission, said, "We are seeing, in fact, a rise of extremism from the extreme right and from the extreme left" and suggested that the election might become "a festival of unfounded reproaches against Europe."

== Presidential candidates ==
The Lisbon Treaty, which entered into force on 1 December 2009, provides that the European Parliament shall endorse or veto the appointment of the president of the European Commission on the basis of a proposal made by the European Council, taking into account the European elections (article 17, paragraph 7 of the Treaty on European Union). This provision applied for the first time for the 2014 elections.

Nevertheless, senior figures such as European Council president Herman Van Rompuy, German Chancellor Angela Merkel, and former Commission president Jacques Delors questioned the aspiration of European political parties to link the presidency of the European Commission with the result of the European elections and insisted that the future Commission president has to suit Member States' expectations first.

Based on these new provisions, the following European political parties designated candidates for Commission president ahead of the 2014 election: the Party of European Socialists (PES), the European People's Party (EPP), the Alliance of Liberals and Democrats for Europe Party (ALDE party), the European Green Party (EGP), the Party of European Left (EL) and the European Democratic Party.

=== Overview ===
European political party		EP Group	Lead candidate(s)
EPP	European People's Party	EPP Group	Jean-Claude Juncker
PES	Party of European Socialists	S&D	Martin Schulz
ALDE	Alliance of Liberals and Democrats for Europe Party	ALDE Group	Guy Verhofstadt
EDP	European Democratic Party	ALDE Group	Guy Verhofstadt
EGP	European Green Party	Greens/EFA	José Bové, Ska Keller
EFA	European Free Alliance	Greens/EFA	None
AECR	Alliance of European Conservatives and Reformists	ECR	None
PEL	Party of the European Left	GUE/NGL	Alexis Tsipras
MELD	Movement for a Europe of Liberties and Democracy	EFD	None
EAF	European Alliance for Freedom	NI	None
ECPM	European Christian Political Movement	ECR, EFD	None

=== European People's Party ===
On 6 and 7 March 2014, the congress of the European People's Party in Dublin elected Jean-Claude Juncker as its presidential candidate, who run against Michel Barnier, and adopted an election manifesto. Juncker set out the priorities he would have as president:

1. Create growth and jobs
2. Reform and reorganise the European energy policy into a new energy union
3. Negotiate a reasonable and balanced trade agreement with the United States
4. Continue with the reform of the Economic and Monetary Union, with the European social dimension in mind
  1. Re-balance the relationship between elected politicians and the European Central Bank in the daily management of the Eurozone
  2. Re-balance the way in which we grant conditional stability support to Eurozone countries in financial difficulties
  3. Strengthen the external projection of our monetary union
5. Give an answer to the British question

Juncker also set out five priorities on the subject of immigration:

1. Implement the Common European Asylum System
2. Step up the practical assistance provided by the European Asylum Support Office
3. Step up cooperation with third countries, particularly North African countries
4. More political determination when it comes to legal migration
5. Secure Europe's borders

Finally he set out three foreign policy objectives:

1. Making the High Representative act like a true European Minister of Foreign Affairs
2. Permanent structured cooperation in defence matters
3. A pause for enlargement

=== Party of European Socialists ===
The Common Candidate process of the Party of European Socialists was carried out according to the following timetable:

- 1–31 October 2013: nominations.
- 6 November 2013: PES Presidency meeting to check the candidacies and publish the official list of candidates.
- 1 December 2013 – 31 January 2014: internal selection process within each member Party or organisation.
- February 2014: PES Election Congress to ratify the votes on the candidate, adopt the Manifesto, and launch the PES European election campaign.

Following the defeat of the Party of European Socialists during the European elections of June 2009, the PES made the decision that PES would designate its candidate for Commission president in December 2009, which rapidly triggered debates about how to select this candidate. The PES Congress gathering in Brussels in November 2011 made the decision that it would select the PES candidate through internal primaries in each of its member parties and organisations. Member parties and organisations are free to determine their own voting process, including by opening it to non-members.

- Possible candidates: José Luis Zapatero, Margot Wallström, Helle Thorning Schmidt, Frans Timmermans, Borut Pahor, Sergei Stanishev, Wouter Bos, José Sócrates, Werner Faymann, Pascal Lamy.
- Declared candidate: Martin Schulz
- Elected candidate: Martin Schulz

=== Alliance of Liberals and Democrats for Europe Party ===
The timetable of the Alliance for Liberals and Democrats for Europe Party (ALDE) for designating its candidate for President of the European Commission is:

- 28–30 November: Nominations opens & Election Manifesto adopted at London Congress
- 19 December: Pre-Summit liberal leaders meeting to discuss nominations received
- 20 December: Nominations formally close
- 1 February: ALDE Party Candidate to be announced at special Electoral Congress, Brussels

In 2012, the Alliance of Liberals and Democrats for Europe Party (ALDE) members were said to be "struggling" to find a candidate for Commission president ahead of the 2014 European elections. Guy Verhofstadt was considered to be the likely nominee, but a meeting of the then-ELDR party held in Dublin from 8 to 10 November 2012 did not agree to formally nominate him yet; concerns voiced included the fact that it was considered unlikely that Verhofstadt would have a chance of getting elected as President of the European Commission, as Anders Fogh Rasmussen (the incumbent Secretary General of NATO) was expected to be appointed to the post of President of the European Council or High Representative of the Union for Foreign Affairs and Security Policy after the 2014 election, and two liberal politicians in the EU's top ranks were not expected to be considered acceptable. While a compromise position was reached (to nominate a candidate for Commission President "in time for the 2014 European Parliamentary election campaign"), the corresponding resolution was not passed due to disagreements on other points included in the resolution. The ALDE political party finally decided to discuss candidates at the party's pre-summit meeting at the margins of the 19–20 December European Council. Belgian daily De Standaard and EU news website EurActiv reported during the summit that the ALDE party has appointed Mark Rutte and Christian Lindner as 'mediators' between Rehn and Verhofstadt to work out who would be the candidate.

- Possible candidates: Anders Fogh Rasmussen, Guy Verhofstadt, Olli Rehn
- Declared candidates: Guy Verhofstadt, Olli Rehn
- Elected Candidate: Guy Verhofstadt

=== European Green Party ===
In July 2013 European Green Party (EGP) announced that it would run an open primary online. Open to all inhabitants in the union over the age of 16 who "support green values", this resulted in Ska Keller and José Bové being elected candidates. Other qualified candidates were Rebecca Harms and Monica Frassoni.

=== Party of the European Left ===
Meeting on 19 October 2013 in Madrid, the Council of chairpersons of the Party of the European Left (EL) decided to designate a common candidate for the president of the European Commission to prevent "the forces responsible for the crisis" from keeping the monopoly during the electoral campaign. The Council reaffirmed however that this new measure "will not hide, as European leaders and the troika hope, their authoritarianism".

The Council decided to submit to the decision of the next Congress, 13 to 15 December in Madrid, the candidacy of Alexis Tsipras, who "would be the voice of resistance and hope against the ultra-liberal policies and facing the threat of the extreme right". As Alexis Tsipras will therefore be the only candidate for the job, the Council has mandated the Presidency of the EL to consult all members and observers parties of the EL and the GUE/NGL group in the European parliament about this application. Tsipras's candidature was confirmed on 15 December. Alexis Tsipras was elected.

=== European Democratic Party ===
On 2 December 2013 in Rome, the Council of the European Democratic Party decided to designate a candidate on the occasion of the next meeting in February 2014, along with its manifesto. The next president of the Commission will have to "settle a more political Commission". Allied with the Liberals in the ALDE Group but opposed to Olli Rehn, the European Democratic Party welcomed the candidature of Guy Verhofstadt, ALDE Group leader. The party adopted its manifesto on 28 February and named Guy Verhofstadt as its candidate for the Presidency of the European Commission on 12 March. Guy Verhofstadt was elected.

=== Alliance of European Conservatives and Reformists ===
The Alliance of European Conservatives and Reformists did not present a candidate for the European Commission presidency. They argued that participating in the process would legitimate a federalist vision of a European super-state and that the lack of a European demos makes the process illegitimate.

=== European Free Alliance ===
The European Free Alliance stands for "a Europe of Free Peoples based on the principle of subsidiarity, which believe in solidarity with each other and the peoples of the world." It consists of various national-level political parties in Europe advocating either full political independence (statehood), or some form of devolution or self-governance for their country or region. The alliance has generally limited its membership to progressive parties, and therefore, not all European regionalist parties are members of EFA. The EFA stands on the left of the political spectrum, and in the Brussels declaration it emphasises the protection of human rights, sustainable development and social justice. In 2007 the EFA congress in Bilbao added several progressive principles to the declaration: including a commitment to fight against racism, antisemitism, discrimination, xenophobia and islamophobia and a commitment to get full citizenship for migrants, including voting rights.

=== European Christian Political Movement ===
The European Christian Political Movement, abbreviated to ECPM, is a European political party that unites national parties from across Europe that share Christian democratic politics. The member parties are generally more socially conservative and Eurosceptic than the European People's Party, not only at this election allied with the AECR, without any candidate as well.

=== European Pirate Party ===
The newly founded European Pirate Party elected MEP Amelia Andersdotter (who is running for re-election) and The Pirate Bay co-founder Peter Sunde (running for election in Finland) as its candidates for the European Commission presidency. The European Pirate Party is not recognised as a European political party.

== Televised debates ==
The lead candidates designated for nomination to the European Commission presidency participated in various debates, conducted in different countries and variously, in French, German and English. A total of ten debates were held through April and May in the lead up to the election period. Five debates were designed as head-to-head debates between the representatives of the two leading European political parties: Jean-Claude Juncker of the European People's Party and Martin Schulz of the Party of European Socialists. Four others were open to all nominated lead candidates, while one French-language debate was held between José Bové of the European Green Party and Guy Verhofstadt of the Alliance of Liberals and Democrats for Europe Party.

Date	Time (CEST)	Institute	Participants	Location	Language	Main Presenter(s)
9 April 2014	17:10	France 24 and RFI	Juncker and Schulz	Brussels	French	Caroline de Camaret (France 24) and Dominique Baillard (RFI)
9 April 2014		France 24	Juncker and Schulz	Brussels	English	Christophe Robeet (France 24)
28 April 2014	19:00	European Youth Forum, City and University of Maastricht, Euronews	Juncker, Schulz, Verhofstadt, and Keller	Maastricht	English	Isabelle Kumar (Euronews)
29 April 2014	14:30	Euranet Plus	Juncker, Schulz, Verhofstadt, and Keller	Brussels	English	Brian Mcguire (Euranet) and Ahinara Bascuñana López (Euranet)
8 May 2014	20:15	ZDF and ORF	Juncker and Schulz	Berlin	German	Ingrid Thurnher (ORF) and Peter Frey (ZDF)
9 May 2014	18:30	EUI	Juncker, Schulz, Verhofstadt and Bové	Florence	English	Tony Barber (FT), Monica Maggioni (RAI) and J.H.H. Weiler (EUI)
13 May 2014	18:30	LCI and RFI	Juncker and Schulz	Paris	French	Michel Field (LCI) and Jérôme Chapuis (RTL)
15 May 2014	21:00	EBU	Juncker, Schulz, Verhofstadt, Keller and Tsipras	Brussels	English	Monica Maggioni (RAI)
19 May 2014	23:01	France 2	Verhofstadt and Bové	Paris	French	Yves Calvi (France 2)
20 May 2014	21:00	ARD	Juncker and Schulz	Hamburg	German	Andreas Cichowicz (NDR) and Sonia Seymour Mikich (WDR)

== Opinion polls ==
No pan-European opinion polls are carried out; however, several institutes compiled predictions of the outcome of the elections based on national polls.

Some of the institutes below, such as Pollwatch, applied algorithms to the national poll results before aggregating them, in an attempt to account for the lower than expected results received by governing parties in previous European Parliament elections. However, other institutions did not share the expectation that governing parties would automatically perform worse than the polls suggest.

Opinion polls
Date	Institute	EPP	S&D	ALDE	Greens–EFA	ECR	GUE-NGL	EFD	NI
22 May 2014	Scenari Politici	219 (29.2%)	208 (27.7%)	66 (8.8%)	41 (5.5%)	43 (5.7%)	48 (6.4%)	31 (4.1%)	95 (12.6%)
21 May 2014	Cicero Group	204 (27.2%)	190 (25.3%)	83 (11.1%)	54 (7.2%)	35 (4.7%)	55 (7.3%)	31 (4.1%)	99 (13.2%)
21 May 2014	election.de	219 (29.2%)	202 (26.9%)	71 (9.5%)	42 (5.6%)	50 (6.8%)	51 (6.7%)	57 (7.6%)	59 (7.9%)
20 May 2014	Pollwatch	217 (28.9%)	201 (26.8%)	59 (7.9%)	44 (5.9%)	42 (5.6%)	53 (7.1%)	40 (5.3%)	95 (12.6%)
19 May 2014	TNS	217 (28.9%)	199 (26.5%)	61 (8.1%)	50 (6.7%)	42 (5.6%)	46 (6.1%)	33 (4.4%)	103 (13.7%)
19 May 2014	Der (europäische) Föderalist	215 (28.6%)	202 (26.9%)	70 (9.3%)	48 (6.4%)	39 (5.2%)	49 (6.5%)	29 (3.9%)	99 (13.2%)
19 May 2014	Scenari Politici	213 (28.4%)	224 (29.8%)	63 (8.4%)	39 (5.2%)	42 (5.6%)	47 (6.3%)	29 (3.9%)	94 (12.5%)
16 May 2014	Cicero Group	202 (26.9%)	195 (26%)	83 (11.1%)	52 (6.9%)	37 (4.9%)	55 (7.3%)	29 (3.9%)	98 (13%)
15 May 2014	election.de	220 (29.3%)	209 (27.8%)	74 (9.9%)	43 (5.7%)	48 (6.4%)	50 (6.7%)	56 (7.5%)	51 (6.8%)
12 May 2014	Scenari Politici	210 (28.0%)	225 (30.0%)	66 (8.8%)	40 (5.3%)	42 (5.6%)	47 (6.3%)	29 (3.9%)	92 (12.3%)
8 May 2014	Cicero Group	199 (26.5%)	196 (26.1%)	83 (11.1%)	50 (6.7%)	39 (5.2%)	54 (7.2%)	30 (4.0%)	100 (13.3%)
7 May 2014	Der (europäische) Föderalist	213 (28.4%)	213 (28.4%)	78 (10.4%)	45 (6.0%)	38 (5.1%)	48 (6.4%)	27 (3.6%)	89 (11.9%)
7 May 2014	Pollwatch	216 (28.8%)	205 (27.3%)	63 (8.4%)	41 (5.5%)	39 (5.2%)	49 (6.5%)	39 (5.2%)	99 (13.2%)
5 May 2014	Scenari Politici	210 (28.0%)	222 (29.6%)	63 (8.4%)	38 (5.1%)	42 (5.6%)	51 (6.8%)	29 (3.9%)	96 (12.8%)
2 May 2014	election.de	216 (28.8%)	209 (27.8%)	75 (10.0%)	45 (6.0%)	47 (6.3%)	51 (6.8%)	57 (7.6%)	51 (6.8%)
30 April 2014	Cicero Group	197 (26.2%)	198 (26.4%)	84 (11.2%)	51 (6.8%)	39 (5.2%)	54 (7.2%)	30 (4.0%)	98 (13.0%)
30 April 2014	Pollwatch	213 (28.4%)	208 (27.7%)	62 (8.3%)	42 (5.6%)	42 (5.6%)	51 (6.8%)	36 (4.8%)	97 (12.9%)
29 April 2014	TNS	215 (28.6%)	205 (27.3%)	58 (7.7%)	45 (6.0%)	40 (5.3%)	50 (6.7%)	40 (5.33%)	106 (14.1%)
28 April 2014	Scenari Politici	214 (28.5%)	219 (29.2%)	63 (8.4%)	37 (4.9%)	41 (5.5%)	53 (7.1%)	28 (3.7%)	96 (12.8%)
28 April 2014	Der (europäische) Föderalist	210 (28.0%)	214 (28.5%)	75 (10.0%)	40 (5.3%)	42 (5.6%)	51 (6.8%)	26 (3.5%)	93 (12.4%)
24 April 2014	election.de	207 (27.6%)	218 (29.0%)	73 (9.7%)	42 (5.6%)	55 (7.3%)	57 (7.6%)	50 (6.7%)	49 (6.5%)
23 April 2014	TNS	215 (28.6%)	209 (27.8%)	57 (7.6%)	45 (6.0%)	40 (5.3%)	48 (6.4%)	30 (4.0%)	107 (14.2%)
23 April 2014	Pollwatch	217 (28.9%)	208 (27.7%)	63 (8.4%)	41 (5.5%)	41 (5.5%)	51 (6.8%)	36 (4.8%)	94 (12.5%)
22 April 2014	Cicero Group	205 (27.3%)	200 (26.6%)	83 (11.1%)	48 (6.4%)	35 (4.7%)	55 (7.3%)	28 (3.7%)	97 (12.9%)
21 April 2014	Scenari Politici	215 (28.6%)	218 (29.0%)	65 (8.7%)	37 (4.9%)	42 (5.6%)	53 (7.1%)	25 (3.3%)	96 (12.8%)
21 April 2014	Der (europäische) Föderalist	216 (28.8%)	215 (28.6%)	74 (9.9%)	44 (5.9%)	41 (5.5%)	48 (6.4%)	26 (3.5%)	87 (11.6%)
21 April 2014	Electionista	212 (28.2%)	205 (27.3%)	60 (8.0%)	42 (5.6%)	43 (5.7%)	56 (7.5%)	34 (4.5%)	99 (13.1%)
16 April 2014	Pollwatch	222 (29.6%)	209 (27.8%)	60 (8.0%)	38 (5.1%)	42 (5.6%)	53 (7.1%)	34 (4.5%)	93 (12.4%)
14 April 2014	Der (europäische) Föderalist	218 (29.0%)	216 (28.8%)	72 (9.6%)	43 (5.7%)	41 (5.5%)	50 (6.7%)	27 (3.6%)	84 (11.2%)
14 April 2014	Scenari Politici	215 (28.6%)	219 (29.2%)	64 (8.5%)	37 (4.9%)	41 (5.5%)	57 (7.6%)	25 (3.3%)	93 (12.4%)
9 April 2014	Cicero Group	208 (27.7%)	198 (26.4%)	86 (11.5%)	47 (6.3%)	39 (4.8%)	59 (7.9%)	28 (3.7%)	89 (11.9%)
7 April 2014	Scenari Politici	216 (28.8%)	220 (29.3%)	63 (8.4%)	35 (4.7%)	41 (5.5%)	56 (7.5%)	25 (3.3%)	95 (12.6%)
7 April 2014	Der (europäische) Föderalist	219 (29.2%)	212 (28.2%)	72 (9.6%)	45 (6.0%)	39 (5.2%)	51 (6.8%)	27 (3.6%)	87 (11.6%)
3 April 2014	Pollwatch	212 (28.2%)	212 (28.2%)	62 (8.3%)	38 (5.1%)	46 (6.1%)	55 (7.3%)	36 (4.8%)	90 (12%)
2 April 2014	Der (europäische) Föderalist	213 (28.4%)	213 (28.4%)	72 (9.6%)	48 (6.4%)	43 (5.7%)	55 (7.3%)	28 (3.7%)	79 (10.5%)
2 April 2014	Cicero Group	203 (27%)	193 (25.7%)	86 (11.5%)	56 (7.5%)	39 (5.2%)	56 (7.5%)	28 (3.7%)	90 (12%)
31 March 2014	Scenari Politici	212 (28.2%)	224 (29.8%)	63 (8.4%)	36 (4.8%)	41 (5.5%)	56 (7.5%)	25 (3.3%)	94 (12.5%)
27 March 2014	Der (europäische) Föderalist	212 (28.2%)	213 (28.4%)	72 (9.6%)	44 (5.9%)	43 (5.7%)	58 (7.7%)	28 (3.7%)	81 (10.8%)
27 March 2014	TNS	212 (28.2%)	208 (27.7%)	58 (7.7%)	43 (5.7%)	40 (5.3%)	53 (7.1%)	32 (4.2%)	105 (14.0%)
26 March 2014	Cicero Group	198 (26.4%)	196 (26.1%)	84 (11.2%)	52 (6.9%)	43 (5.7%)	61 (8.1%)	27 (3.6%)	90 (12%)
24 March 2014	Scenari Politici	212 (28.2%)	226 (30.1%)	63 (8.4%)	34 (4.5%)	41 (5.5%)	57 (7.6%)	26 (3.5%)	92 (12.3%)
19 March 2014	Der (europäische) Föderalist	211 (28.1%)	215 (28.6%)	71 (9.5%)	43 (5.7%)	39 (5.2%)	58 (7.7%)	30 (4.0%)	84 (11.2%)
19 March 2014	Pollwatch	213 (28.4%)	214 (28.5%)	66 (8.8%)	38 (5.1%)	40 (5.3%)	57 (7.6%)	33 (4.4%)	90 (12.0%)
18 March 2014	Cicero Group	201 (26.8%)	195 (26.0%)	87 (11.6%)	51 (6.8%)	41 (5.5%)	58 (7.7%)	24 (3.2%)	94 (12.5%)
17 March 2014	Scenari Politici	216 (28.8%)	226 (30.1%)	63 (8.4%)	33 (4.4%)	41 (5.5%)	58 (7.7%)	30 (4.0%)	84 (11.2%)
15 March 2014	Der (europäische) Föderalist	211 (28.1%)	219 (29.2%)	69 (9.2%)	43 (5.7%)	41 (5.5%)	56 (7.5%)	25 (3.3%)	87 (11.5%)
13 March 2014	TNS	219 (29.2%)	204 (27.2%)	61 (8.1%)	45 (6.0%)	42 (5.6%)	51 (6.8%)	26 (3.5%)	103 (12.7%)
10 March 2014	Scenari Politici	217 (28.9%)	226 (30.1%)	63 (8.4%)	34 (4.5%)	41 (5.5%)	62 (8.3%)	30 (4.0%)	78 (10.4%)
5 March 2014	Pollwatch	202 (26.9%)	209 (27.8%)	61 (8.1%)	44 (5.9%)	45 (6.0%)	67 (8.9%)	31 (4.1%)	92 (12.3%)
3 March 2014	Scenari Politici	216 (28.8%)	224 (29.8%)	63 (8.4%)	34 (4.5%)	42 (5.6%)	62 (8.3%)	30 (4.0%)	80 (10.7%)
2 March 2014	Electionista	204 (27.2%)	206 (27.4%)	72 (9.6%)	42 (5.6%)	45 (6.0%)	59 (7.8%)	31 (4.1%)	92 (12.3%)
27 February 2014	Der (europäische) Föderalist	214 (28.5%)	214 (28.5%)	70 (9.3%)	45 (6.0%)	44 (5.9%)	57 (7.6%)	24 (3.2%)	83 (11.1%)
23 February 2014	Kapa Research	202 (26.9%)	215 (28.6%)	74 (9.9%)	43 (5.7%)	41 (5.5%)	56 (7.5%)	38 (5.1%)	82 (10.9%)
19 February 2014	Pollwatch	200 (26.6%)	217 (28.9%)	70 (9.3%)	44 (5.9%)	42 (5.6%)	56 (7.5%)	30 (4.0%)	92 (12.3%)
7 June 2009	2009 election	265 (36.0%)	183 (25.0%)	84 (11.4%)	55 (7.5%)	54 (7.3%)	35 (4.8%)	32 (4.3%)	28 (3.8%)

Note: Percentages indicate proportion of predicted seats and not vote share.

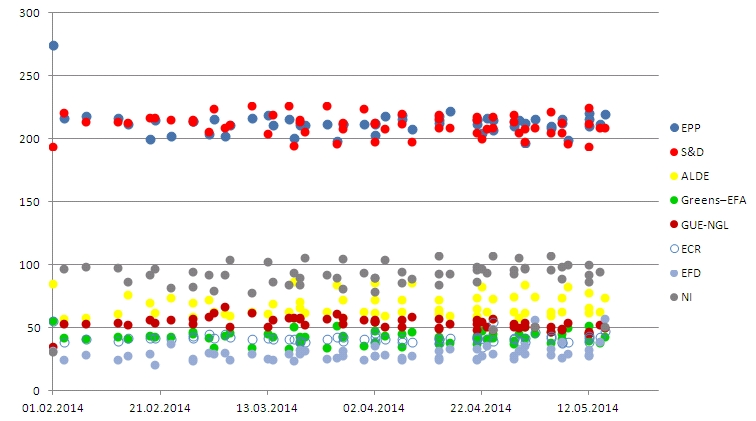
Polls (until 15 May 2014)

== Apportionment of seats ==
Apportionment of seats
Member state	2009	2014	Change
Germany	99	96	−3
France	72	74	+2
United Kingdom (including Gibraltar)	72	73	+1
Italy	72	73	+1
Spain	50	54	+4
Poland	50	51	+1
Romania	33	32	−1
Netherlands	25	26	+1
Belgium	22	21	−1
Greece	22	21	−1
Czech Republic	22	21	−1
Portugal	22	21	−1
Hungary	22	21	−1
Sweden	18	20	+2
Austria	17	18	+1
Bulgaria	17	17	+0
Denmark	13	13	+0
Finland	13	13	+0
Slovakia	13	13	+0
Ireland	12	11	−1
Croatia	/	11	/
Lithuania	12	11	−1
Slovenia	7	8	+1
Latvia	8	8	+0
Estonia	6	6	+0
Cyprus	6	6	+0
Luxembourg	6	6	+0
Malta	5	6	+1
Total	736	751	+15

Decisions on the apportionment of seats in the Parliament are governed by article 14 of the Treaty of Lisbon. This article lays down that "The European Parliament shall be composed of representatives of the Union's citizens. They shall not exceed seven hundred and fifty in number, plus the President. Representation of citizens shall be degressively proportional, with a minimum threshold of six members per Member State. No Member State shall be allocated more than ninety-six seats."

It had been the stated desire of the member-state governments to ratify the Treaty of Lisbon before the 2009 election, so that its articles governing the European Parliament could be in force for that election. However, this was blocked by the Irish rejection of the treaty in a referendum. Therefore, in June 2009, the European Parliament was elected under the rules of the Treaty of Nice, which provided for 736 seats, instead of the 751 to be provided in the Treaty of Lisbon.

The Lisbon Treaty was subsequently ratified, and provisional measures were ratified in December 2011 to give the 18 additional seats, to the countries entitled to them, before the 2014 elections, without withdrawing Germany's 3 extra seats. These 18 additional MEPs brought the number of MEPs to 754 temporarily until 2014. These 18 "phantom MEPs" would initially have observer status, before becoming full members of the parliament if an additional protocol is ratified by 2014.

Thus the 2014 election will be the first to apply the apportionment of seats provided by the Lisbon treaty.

Andrew Duff MEP (ALDE, UK) tabled two reports in March 2011 and September 2012 proposing new apportionments of seats (see table opposite). Article 14 provides that "The European Council shall adopt by unanimity, on the initiative of the European Parliament and with its consent, a decision establishing the composition of the European Parliament", respecting the principle of degressive proportionality, the threshold of 6 MEPs for smaller member states and the limit of 96 MEPs for larger member states.

== Election dates ==
22 May	23 May	24 May	25 May	Map
Netherlands, United Kingdom (including Gibraltar)	Ireland	Latvia, Malta, Slovakia, French Overseas Territories	Austria, Belgium, Bulgaria, Croatia, Cyprus, Denmark, Estonia, Finland, Metropolitan France, Germany, Greece, Hungary, Italy, Lithuania, Luxembourg, Poland, Portugal, Romania, Sweden, Slovenia, Spain	
Netherlands, United Kingdom (including Gibraltar)	Czech Republic		Austria, Belgium, Bulgaria, Croatia, Cyprus, Denmark, Estonia, Finland, Metropolitan France, Germany, Greece, Hungary, Italy, Lithuania, Luxembourg, Poland, Portugal, Romania, Sweden, Slovenia, Spain	

== Results ==
The centre-right European People's Party won the most seats, but came up well short of a majority. In Denmark, France, and United Kingdom rightist groups opposed to the European Union won "unprecedented" victories according to some news organisations such as Reuters. Elsewhere, populist parties won significant seats. In total, roughly a quarter of all seats went to parties sceptical of the EU or protest parties. Thus, the election was seen as anti-establishment. In the wake of the election, several prominent political figures said the EU needed to realign its priorities in a hurry. Dutch Prime Minister Mark Rutte called for "fewer rules and less fuss", while British Prime Minister David Cameron said "Europe should concentrate on what matters, on growth and jobs, and not try to do so much."

State	Political groups of the 7th European Parliament (previous session)																		MEPs		Note
State	EPP (EPP)		S&D (PES)		ECR (AECR, ECPM)		ALDE (ALDE, EDP)		GUE/NGL (EL, NGLA, EACL)		G-EFA (EGP, EFA)		EFD (MELD)		NI		New parties w/o affiliation (Note: Highlight colours show declared group affiliation in the incoming parliament.)		MEPs		Note
Germany	29 (CDU); 5 (CSU)	−5 −3	27 (SPD)	+4			3 (FDP)	−9	7 (Linke)	−1	11 (B'90/Grüne)	−3					7 (AfD) 1 (FW) 1 (Piraten) 1 (Tierschutz) 1 (NPD) 1 (Familie) 1 (ÖDP) 1 (Partei)	+14	96	−3	
France	20 (UMP)	−9	12+1 (PS+PRG)	−1			3+4 (UDI+MoDem)	−3	3 (FG); 1 (UOM)	−1 =	6 (EE)	−6	0 (MPF)	−1	23 + 1 (FN) (Note: Mrs Joëlle Bergeron who was elected from the Marine blue gathering's electoral list will eventually seat as an independent MEP in the Europe of Freedom and Democracy political group after having ended her membership of the National Front.)	+21			74	=	
(United Kingdom); United; Kingdom			20 (LAB)	+7	19 (CON); 1 (UUP)	−7 =	1 (LD)	−11	1 (SF)	=	3 (GPEW); 2 (SNP); 1 (PC)	+1 = =	24 (UKIP)	+11	1 (DUP); 0 (BNP)	= −2			73	=	
Italy	13 (FI); 2+1 (NCD+UDC); 1 (SVP)	−16 -2 =	31 (PD)	+10			0 (IdV)	−7	3 (AET)	+3			5 (LN)	−4			17 (M5S)	+17	73	=	
Spain	16 (PP); 1 (CpE: UDC)	−8 =	13+1 (PSOE+PSC)	−9			1+1 (CpE: CDC+PNV)	=	4+1 (IP: IU+Anova)	+4	2 (EPDD) 1 (LPD: EH Bildu+BNG) 1 (PE: Comp.+Equo) 1 (IP: ICV)	+1~2 +0~1 +1 =			4 (UPyD)	+3	5 (Podemos) 2 (C's)	+7	54	=	
Poland	19 (PO); 4 (PSL)	-6; 0	4+1 (SLD+UP)	−2	18+1 (PiS+PR)	+4											4 (KNP)	+4	51	=	
Romania	5 (PDL); 2 (UDMR); 2 (PMP); 0 (Băsescu)	−5 −1 +2 −1	13+1+2 (PSD+PC+UNPR)	+5			6 (PNL)	+1							0 (PRM)	−3	1 (Diaconu)	+1	32	−1	
Netherlands	5 (CDA)	=	3 (PvdA)	=	1 (CU)	=	4 (D66); 3 (VVD)	+1 =	2 (SP)	=	2 (GL)	−1	1 (SGP)	=	4 (PVV)	=	1 (PvdD)	+1	26	+1	
Belgium	2 (CD&V); 1 (CDH); 1 (CSP)	−1 = =	3 (PS); 1 (SP.A)	= −1	0 (LDD)	−1	3 (Open VLD); 3 (MR)	= +1			4 (N-VA) 1 (Groen); 1 (Ecolo)	+3 = −1			1 (VB)	−1			21	−1	
(Czech Republic); Czech; Republic	3+1 (TOP 09+STAN); 3 (KDU-ČSL)	+4 +1	4 (ČSSD)	−3	2 (ODS)	−7			3 (KSČM)	−1							4 (ANO) 1 (Svobodní)	+5	21	−1	
Greece	5 (ND)	−3	2 (Elia: PASOK)	−6					6 (SYRIZA) 2 (KKE)	+5 =	0 (OP)	−1	0 (LAOS)	−2			3 (XA) 1 (ANEL) 2 (Potami)	+6	21	−1	
Hungary	11+1 (Fidesz+KDNP)	−2	2 (MSZP)	−2	0 (MDF)	−1					1 (LMP)	+1			3 (Jobbik)	=	2 (DK) 0+1 (Együtt+PM)	+3	21	−1	
Portugal	6+1 (PSD+CDS-PP)	−3	8 (PS)	+1					3 (CDU: PCP); 1 (BE)	+1 −2							2 (MPT)	+2	21	−1	
Sweden	3 (M); 1 (KD)	−1 =	5 (S)	-1			2 (FP); 1 (C)	−1 =	1 (V)	=	4 (MP); 0 (PP)	+2 −2					2 (SD) 1 (FI)	+3	20	=	
Austria	5 (ÖVP)	−1	5 (SPÖ)	=			1 (NEOS)	+1			3 (Grüne)	+1			4 (FPÖ) 0 (MARTIN); 0 (BZÖ)	+2 −3 −1			18	−1	
Bulgaria	6 (GERB); 1 (RB: DSB); 0 (RB: SDS)	+1 = −1	4 (KB: BSP)	=			4 (DPS); 0 (NDSV)	+1 −2							0 (Ataka)	−2	1 (BBTs) 1 (VMRO) (Note: VMRO was elected on the BBT list, and was accepted to the ECR Group in late June.)	+2	17	−1	
Finland	3 (Kok.); 0 (KD)	= −1	2 (SDP)	=			3 (Kesk.); 1 (RKP)	= =	1 (Vas.)	+1	1 (Vihr.)	−1	2 (PS)	+1					13	=	
Denmark	1 (K)	=	3 (S)	−1			2 (V); 1 (RV)	−1 +1	1 (N)	=	1 (SF)	−1	4 (DF)	+2					13	=	
Slovakia	2 (KDH); 2 (SDKÚ-DS); 1 (SMK); 1 (Most-Híd)	= = −1 +1	4 (Smer)	−1			1 (SaS); 0 (ĽS-HZDS)	+1 −1					0 (SNS)	−1			1 (OĽaNO); 1 (Nova)	+2	13	=	
Croatia	4 (HDZ); 1 (HSS)	-1 +1	2 (SDP)	−3	1 (HSP-AS)	=	1 (HNS); 1 (IDS)	+1 +1	0 (HL-SR)	−1							1 (ORaH)	+1	11	−1	
(Republic of Ireland); Ireland	4 (FG)	=	0 (Lab)	−3			1 (FF) (Note: Brian Crowley was the sole elected Fianna Fáil MEP, which had sat with the ALDE group in the previous Parliament. Against party wishes, Crowley left the ALDE group and joined the ECR group for the Eighth Parliament. Fianna Fáil was and remains a member of the ALDE party, and as a result of Crowley's actions, the party whip was withdrawn, though he retains his party membership.) 1 (Harkin)	−2 =	3 (SF); 0 (Soc)	+3 −1					1 (Childers)	+1	1 (Flanagan)	+1	11	−1	
Lithuania	2 (TS-LKD)	–2	2 (LSDP)	−1	1 (LLRA)	=	2 (LRLS); 1 (DP)	+1 =					2 (TT)	=			1 (LVŽS)	+1	11	−1	
Latvia	4 (Vienotība)	+1	1 (Saskaņa SDP)	−1	1 (NA)	=	0 (LPP/LC)	−1	0 (LSP)	−1	1 (LKS)	=					1 (ZZS: LZS)	+1	8	−1	
Slovenia	3 (SDS); 1+1 (NSi+SLS)	= +1	1 (SD)	−1			0 (LDS); 0 (Zares)	−1 −1									1 (DeSUS) 1 (Verjamem)	+2	8	=	
Cyprus	2 (DISY)	=	1 (EDEK); 1 (DIKO)	= =					2 (AKEL)	=									6	=	
Estonia	1 (IRL)	=	1 (SDE)	=			2 (RE); 1 (KE)	+1 −1			1 (Tarand)	=							6	=	
Luxembourg	3 (CSV)	=	1 (LSAP)	=			1 (DP)	=			1 (Gréng)	=							6	=	
Malta	3 (PN)	+1	3 (PL)	−1															6	=	
Total (Note: Official results as of Wednesday 28 May 2014, 8:30 UTC: all 751 seats assigned.) (Note: Differences in seat counts for each group only take into account parties or individuals who were already members of a given group in the outgoing parliament (or of a corresponding European party). The MEPs elected in 2014 will be free to join existing groups or form new ones. To learn more about this process, see Political groups of the European Parliament and section #Group reshuffling below.)																			MEPs		
Total	EPP		S&D		ECR		ALDE		GUE/NGL		G-EFA		EFD		NI		New parties		MEPs		
Total	215 (28.6%)	−59	185 (24.6%)	−11	45 (6.0%)	−12	59 (7.9%)	−24	45 (6.0%)	+10	49 (6.5%)	−8	38 (5.1%)	+7	42 (5.6%)	+9	73 (9.7%)		751	−15	

=== Group reshuffling ===
Between the election and the inaugural session of the 8th European Parliament, scheduled for 1 July, some parties and individual MEPs usually switch allegiances between the political groups of the European Parliament. This process, which sometimes has resulted in the disappearance of whole political groups from the Parliament, or their recomposition in another form, is particularly important for new parties and MEPs.

=== Announced membership changes ===
The following table describes the announced membership changes in the Parliament groupings and the impact on the Parliament makeup:

	Announced changes in the makeup of the political groups for the 8th European Parliament																MEPs	
	EPP		S&D		ECR		ALDE		GUE/NGL		G-EFA		EFDD (replacing EFD)		NI		MEPs	
End of 7th Parliament (seats)	274		196		57		83		35		57		31		33		766	
End of 7th Parliament (percentage)	36%		26%		7%		11%		5%		7%		4%		4%		100%	
Number of member states	27		28		9		21		16		15		9		10		n/a	
Election changes (cf table above)	215	−59	185	−11	45	−12	59	−24	45	+10	49	−8	38	+7	42	+9	751	−15
Accession	(Romania) PNL	+6	(Greece) Potami (Hungary) DK (Republic of Ireland) Child. (Sweden) FI	+2 +2 +1 +1	(Belgium) N-VA (Bulgaria) BBTs (Bulgaria) VMRO (Denmark) DF (Finland) PS (Germany) AfD (Germany) Famil. (Greece) ANEL (Republic of Ireland) FF (Netherlands) SGP (Slovakia) Nova (Slovakia) OĽaNO	+4 +1 +1 +4 +2 +7 +1 +1 +1 +1 +1 +1	(Czech Republic) ANO (Germany) FW (Portugal) MPT (Romania) Diac. (Slovenia) DeSUS (Spain) UPyD (Spain) C's	+4 +1 +2 +1 +1 +4 +2	(Germany) Tiersch. (Republic of Ireland) Flanag. (Netherlands) PvdD (Spain) Podem. (Spain) LPD	+1 +1 +1 +5 +1	(Croatia) OraH (Germany) ÖDP (Germany) Pirat. (Hungary) PM (Lithuania) LVŽS (Slovenia) Verj.	+1 +1 +1 +1 +1 +1	(Czech Republic) Svob. (France) Berg. (Italy) M5S (Latvia) ZZS (Sweden) SD	+1 +1 +17 +1 +2	(Germany) NPD (Germany) PARTEI (Greece) KKE (Greece) XA (Italy) LN (Poland) KNP	+1 +1 +2 +3 +5 +4	751	
Withdrawal							(Republic of Ireland) FF (Romania) PNL	−1 −6	(Greece) KKE	−2	(Belgium) N-VA (Spain) LPD	−4 −1	(Denmark) DF (Finland) PS (Italy) LN (Netherlands) SGP	−4 −2 −5 −1	(France) Berg. (Republic of Ireland) Child. (Spain) UPyD	−1 −1 −4	751	
Start of 8th Parliament (seats)	221	−53	191	−5	70	+13	67	−16	52	+17	50	−7	48	+17	52	+19	751	
Start of 8th Parliament (percentage)	29%	−7pp	26%	=	9%	+2pp	9%	−2pp	7%	+2pp	7%	=	6%	+2pp	7%	+3pp	100%	
Number of member states	27	=	28	=	15	+6	21	=	14	-2	17	+2	7	-2	10	=		

A group is required to be made up by at least 25 MEPs from seven Member States to be constituted in the new legislature.

A proposed European Alliance for Freedom (EAF) group, said to be composed of the French FN, Dutch PVV, Austrian FPÖ, Belgian VB and Italian LN, was unable to reach the threshold. About a year later, on 16 June 2015, the same parties formed the Europe of Nations and Freedom group together with two MEPs from KNP and a former UKIP MEP.

=== Make-up following election ===
Based on the new groupingon the ENF, the Parliament makeup following the election were as follows:

State	Political groups of the 8th European Parliament								MEPs
State	EPP	S&D	ECR	ALDE	GUE/NGL	G-EFA	EFDD	NI	MEPs
Germany	29 (CDU); 5 (CSU)	27 (SPD)	7 (AfD); 1 (Familie)	3 (FDP); 1 (FW)	7 (Linke); 1 (Tierschutz)	11 (B'90/Grüne); 1 (Piraten); 1 (ÖDP)		1 (NPD); 1 (Partei)	96
France	20 (UMP)	12 (PS); 1 (PRG)		4 (MoDem); 3 (UDI)	3 (FG); 1 (UOM)	6 (EE)	1 (Bergeron)	23 (FN)	74
(United Kingdom); United; Kingdom		20 (Lab)	19 (Cons.); 1 (UUP)	1 (LibDem)	1 (SF)	3 (Green); 2 (SNP); 1 (PC)	24 (UKIP)	1 (DUP)	73
Italy	13 (FI); 2 (NCD); 1 (UDC); 1 (SVP)	31 (PD)			3 (AET)		17 (M5S)	5 (LN)	73
Spain	16 (PP); 1 (UDC)	13 (PSOE); 1 (PSC)		4 (UPyD); 2 (C's); 1 (CDC); 1 (PNV)	5 (Podemos); 4 (IU); 1 (Anova); 1 (LPD)	2 (EDD); 1 (ICV); 1 (PE)			54
Poland	19 (PO); 4 (PSL)	4 (SLD); 1 (UP)	18 (PiS); 1 (PR)					4 (KNP)	51
Romania	6 (PNL); 5 (PDL); 2 (UDMR); 2 (PMP)	13 (PSD); 2 (UNPR); 1 (PC)		1 (Diaconu)					32
Netherlands	5 (CDA)	3 (PvdA)	1 (CU); 1 (SGP)	4 (D66); 3 (VVD)	2 (SP); 1 (PvdD)	2 (GL)		4 (PVV)	26
Belgium	2 (CD&V); 1 (CDH); 1 (CSP)	3 (PS); 1 (SP.A)	4 (N-VA)	3 (Open VLD); 3 (MR)		1 (Groen); 1 (Ecolo)		1 (VB)	21
(Czech Republic); Czech; Republic	3 (KDU-ČSL); 3 (TOP 09); 1 (STAN)	4 (ČSSD)	2 (ODS)	4 (ANO)	3 (KSČM)		1 (Svobodní)		21
Greece	5 (ND)	2 (PASOK); 2 (Potami)	1 (ANEL)		6 (SYRIZA)			3 (XA); 2 (KKE)	21
Hungary	11 (Fidesz); 1 (KDNP)	2 (MSZP); 2 (DK)				1 (LMP); 1 (PM)		3 (Jobbik)	21
Portugal	6 (PSD); 1 (CDS-PP)	8 (PS)		2 (MPT)	3 (PCP); 1 (BE)				21
Sweden	3 (M); 1 (KD)	5 (S); 1 (FI)		2 (FP); 1 (C)	1 (V)	4 (MP)	2 (SD)		20
Austria	5 (ÖVP)	5 (SPÖ)		1 (NEOS)		3 (Grüne)		4 (FPÖ)	18
Bulgaria	6 (GERB); 1 (DSB)	4 (BSP)	1 (BBTs); 1 (VMRO)	4 (DPS)					17
Finland	3 (Kok.)	2 (SDP)	2 (PS)	3 (Kesk.); 1 (RKP)	1 (Vas.)	1 (Vihr.)			13
Denmark	1 (K)	3 (S)	4 (DF)	2 (V); 1 (RV)	1 (N)	1 (SF)			13
Slovakia	2 (KDH); 2 (SDKÚ-DS); 1 (SMK); 1 (Most-Híd)	4 (Smer – SD)	1 (OĽaNO); 1 (Nova)	1 (SaS)					13
Croatia	4 (HDZ); 1 (HSS)	2 (SDP)	1 (HSP-AS)	1 (HNS); 1 (IDS)		1 (ORaH)			11
(Republic of Ireland); Ireland	4 (FG)	1 (Childers)	1 (FF/Crowley)	1 (Harkin)	3 (SF); 1 (Flanagan)				11
Lithuania	2 (TS-LKD)	2 (LSDP)	1 (LLRA)	2 (LRLS); 1 (DP)		1 (LVŽS)	2 (TT)		11
Latvia	4 (Vienotība)	1 (Saskaņa SDP)	1 (NA)			1 (LKS)	1 (LZS)		8
Slovenia	3 (SDS); 1 (NSi); 1 (SLS)	1 (SD)		1 (DeSUS)		1 (Verjamem)			8
Cyprus	2 (DISY)	1 (EDEK); 1 (DIKO)			2 (AKEL)				6
Estonia	1 (IRL)	1 (SDE)		2 (RE); 1 (KE)		1 (Tarand)			6
Luxembourg	3 (CSV)	1 (LSAP)		1 (DP)		1 (Gréng)			6
Malta	3 (PN)	3 (PL)							6
Total									MEPs
Total	EPP	S&D	ECR	ALDE	GUE/NGL	G-EFA	EFDD	NI	MEPs
Total	221 (29%)	191 (25%)	70 (9%)	67 (9%)	52 (7%)	50 (7%)	48 (6%)	52 (7%)	751

The largest European Parliament group as elected by each constituency. For the French Overseas Territories constituency, its three sections are considered. EPP S&D ALDE Greens/EFA ECR GUE/NGL EFD NI

Parliamentary seats
EPP	29.40%
S&D	25.40%
ECR	9.30%
ALDE	8.90%
NI	7.00%
GUE-NGL	6.90%
Greens-EFA	6.70%
EFDD	6.40%

=== Voter turnout ===
The final turnout figure for the 2014 European Parliament elections reached an all-time low at 42.54%, and thus marked a continued downward turnout since the first direct election. The result was also lower than the number communicated immediately after the elections. During the election night exit polls suggested a turnout of 43.1% based on preliminary figures. This was then revised down to 43.09% a few days later. There was a small increase in absolute voter numbers, with 163,551,013 valid votes cast in 2014 as compared to 160,687,462 in 2009, though this was outweighed by the increase in eligible voters from 386,711,169 in 2009 to 396,104,240 in 2014.

== New European Commission ==
The leaders of the parliament's seven groups met on Tuesday 27 May to discuss who should become the new president of the European Commission. Citing the Lisbon Treaty's requirement for the result of the elections to be "taken into account", five of the seven groups issued a statement saying that Juncker should be nominated by the European Council to be president. Only the ECR and EFD disagreed. However, when the European Council met that evening, they said that nominations should only be made "after having held the appropriate consultations". They authorised van Rompuy, President of the Council, to consult with the new group leaders in the European Parliament and to report back to their summit on 26 June. The leaders of the UK, Hungary and Sweden were said to have opposed Juncker although the Swedish government then declared that Sweden never had such opposition. Leaders of the European People's Party publicly acknowledged that Juncker may not end up heading the executive European Commission. Friday, 27 June, the European Council eventually proposed to the European Parliament the candidacy of Jean-Claude Juncker to the presidency of the European Commission. The United Kingdom and Hungary opposed Juncker's nomination, while the remaining Council members supported his candidacy. The European Parliament confirmed Juncker's nomination on a vote of 422 in favour to 250 opposed, 47 abstentions and 10 invalid votes. Most EPP, Socialist and Liberal MEPs supported Juncker's nomination.

The appointment of top EU jobs in the new government was expected to be contentious. Leaders of EU member states agreed to seek a package deal that would give significant posts to the new political parties in an effort to win back public support for the European Parliament. According to German Chancellor Angela Merkel, the new government will focus on making EU economies more competitive in the global economy, seek common energy and environmental policies, and seek a united foreign policy.

The main political groups, including the EPP and the S&D, in the European Parliament on 12 June backed the right of Jean-Claude Juncker to be the next head of the European Commission, after talks with the President of the European Council Herman Van Rompuy.

Juncker has stated that his priorities would be the creation of a digital single market, the development of an EU energy union, the negotiation of the Transatlantic trade agreement, the continued reform of the economic and monetary union, with the social dimension in mind and a 'targeted fiscal capacity' for the Euro area, as well as to negotiate a new deal with Britain, which ultimately failed to be accepted in the Brexit vote.
