= Europe of Freedom and Direct Democracy =

Former Eurosceptic political group of the European Parliament

- European Parliament group
- Europe of Freedom and Direct Democracy Group logo
- Name: Europe of Freedom and Direct Democracy
- English abbr.: EFDD
- French abbr.: ELDD
- Formal name: Europe of Freedom and Direct Democracy Group in the European Parliament
- Ideology: Euroscepticism; Right-wing populism Direct democracy
- Political position: Right-wing to far-right
- European parties: Alliance for Direct Democracy in Europe (2014–16)
- From: 24 June 2014
- To: 26 June 2019
- Preceded by: Europe of Freedom and Democracy
- Chaired by: Nigel Farage (UKIP/BXP); David Borrelli (M5S) (until 2017)
- Website: www.efddgroup.eu

Europe of Freedom and Direct Democracy (EFDD or EFD²) was a Eurosceptic and populist political group in the European Parliament. The EFDD group was a continuation for the Eighth European Parliament of the Europe of Freedom and Democracy (EFD) group that existed during the Seventh European Parliament, with significant changes to group membership.

In 2017, it was one of the seven political groups of the parliament. This group was opposed to European integration. Twenty-four out of its 47 MEPs were from the United Kingdom, representing the UK Independence Party.

Its president was British politician Nigel Farage, who was first elected for the UK Independence Party, and then became an independent in 2018 before becoming leader of the Brexit Party in 2019. David Borrelli of the Italian Five Star Movement was co-president until January 2017, when he had to resign the co-presidency after a failed attempt by his party to transfer to the ALDE group.

The parliamentary group was originally linked to the Alliance for Direct Democracy in Europe (ADDE); however, the Alliance later ceased activities in 2016 after an auditors' inquiry found misspending of EU funds and was eventually dissolved on 24 May 2017. Nonetheless, the group continued its activities until 26 June 2019, when it was also dissolved following the 2019 European Parliament election.

== History ==
=== Formation for the 8th European Parliament ===
Following the 2014 European parliament elections, the Europe of Freedom and Democracy (EFD) group faced difficulties reforming for the 8th European Parliament, with various member parties and MEPs of the previous term's EFD either defecting to different parliamentary groups or failing to be re-elected.

On 4 June 2014, the Danish People's Party (Denmark) and Finns Party (Finland) were admitted into the European Conservatives and Reformists (ECR) and therefore were no longer attached to the EFD.

On 12 June 2014, the Five Star Movement (M5S) of Italy, having been rejected by the Greens/EFA and Alliance of Liberals and Democrats for Europe groups, offered its activists a limited-choice online referendum to choose a European Parliament group for the party, in which 78% of participating activists voted for the EFD.

On 16 June 2014, Dutch MEP Bas Belder of the Reformed Political Party (SGP) moved from the EFD to the ECR group.

The EFD group was reformed on 18 June 2014 with MEPs from existing member parties: the UK Independence Party (United Kingdom) and the Order and Justice (Lithuania), in addition to new affiliates: the Five Star Movement, the Sweden Democrats (Sweden), the Party of Free Citizens (Czech Republic), the Latvian Farmers Union (Latvia) and a French independent MEP, formerly of the National Front.

On 24 June 2014, the EFD group name was revised to Europe of Freedom and Direct Democracy (EFDD), and David Borrelli of the Five Star Movement was chosen as the group's co-president.

=== Events during 8th European Parliament ===
On 16 October 2014, it was announced that Iveta Grigule MEP from the Latvian Farmers' Union defected from EFDD to the ALDE group, resulting in the collapse of the group because it was no longer composed of representatives from at least a quarter of the EU's Member States. The criterion was restored on 20 October, with one Polish MEP, Robert Iwaszkiewicz from Congress of the New Right (KNP), joining the group, although the other party's MEPs remained Non-Inscrits.

On 24 January 2015, Amjad Bashir was suspended from UKIP pending a party investigation into financial fraud: Bashir defected to the Conservative Party within an hour of his suspension. On 20 March 2015, Janice Atkinson was suspended from UKIP and later expelled on 23 March for alleged financial fraud. Atkinson joined the Europe of Nations and Freedom (ENF) group at its launch on 15 June 2015.

In April 2015, Valentinas Mazuronis left Order and Justice and joined the ranks of Labour Party, also leaving the EFDD.

On 8 April 2016, Alternative for Germany (AfD) MEP Beatrix von Storch left the ECR group to join EFDD.

On 24 October 2016, Steven Woolfe left the group to sit as Non-Inscrits, followed by Diane James on 20 November 2016.

On 9 January 2017, the Five Star Movement voted in an online referendum to leave EFDD in order to join the ALDE group; however, they were rejected by ALDE later the same day. In the aftermath, two MEPs left the group, with Marco Affronte defected to the Greens/EFA group, and Marco Zanni to the ENL group. Other Five Star Movement MEPs pulled out of switching parliamentary group after threatened by party leader Beppe Grillo with a fine of €250,000.

In October 2017, with change in the French National Front, Florian Philippot, president of the "Patriotes", Sophie Montel and Mireille d'Ornano join the Europe of Freedom and Direct Democracy group.

On 13 February 2018, former group co-president David Borrelli left the M5S and moved to Non-Inscrits.

On 3 July 2018, the 2 Sweden Democrats MEPs moved to ECR group.

In December 2018, Farage and multiple other MEPs left UKIP in protest over Gerard Batten's leadership. Batten in turn left the EFDD and then withdrew the remaining further 6 UKIP MEPs.

In April 2019, group leader Nigel Farage launched the Brexit Party, which he and ten of the other former UKIP MEPs in the group joined, along with one UKIP MEP from the Europe of Nations and Freedom group.

On the 26 June 2019 it was reported that the EFDD had failed to register for the 9th European Parliament, making them no longer an official political group. Most of the former members of EFDD have now become part of the Identity and Democracy political group.

== Membership ==
=== 8th European Parliament, 2014 ===
At foundation, the Europe of Freedom and Direct Democracy had 48 elected members as follows:

Member state	Party	MEPs	Previous group	Additional notes
Czech Republic	Party of Free Citizens	1 / 21	N/A	
France	Joëlle Bergeron (independent MEP)	1 / 74	N/A	Former FN member
Italy	Five Star Movement	17 / 73	N/A	
Latvia	Latvian Farmers Union	1 / 8	N/A	
Lithuania	Order and Justice	2 / 11	Europe of Freedom and Democracy	
Sweden	Sweden Democrats	2 / 20	N/A	
United Kingdom	UK Independence Party	24 / 73	Europe of Freedom and Democracy	

=== 9th European Parliament, 2019 ===
In 2019 the Europe of Freedom and Direct Democracy had 42 members of the European Parliament along with other affiliated parties as follows:

Member state	Party	MEPs	Previous group	Additional notes
Czech Republic	Svobodní	1 / 21	N/A	Petr Mach and Jiří Payne; Petr Mach was elected as MEP however was replaced by Jiří Payne in 2017
France	The Patriots	2 / 74	ENF	Florian Philippot and Mireille d'Ornano; Former FN MEPs
France	Debout la France	2 / 74	ENF	Sylvie Goddyn and Bernard Monot; Former FN MEPs
France	Independent MEPs	2 / 74	N/A	Joëlle Bergeron and Aymeric Chauprade; Former FN MEPs
Germany	Alternative for Germany	1 / 96	ECR	Jörg Meuthen
Italy	Five Star Movement	11 / 73	N/A	Dino Giarrusso, Dario Tamburrano, Fabio Massimo Castaldo, Ignazio Corrao, Isabella Adinolfi, Laura Agea, Laura Ferrara, Marco Zullo, Piernicola Pedicini, Rosa D'Amato and Tiziana Beghin; Six MEPs have left Five Star Movement since creation of EFDD
Italy	Independent MEPs	3 / 73	EFDD	Daniela Aiuto, Giulia Moi and Marco Valli
Lithuania	Order and Justice	1 / 11	EFDD	Rolandas Paksas
Poland	KORWiN	1 / 51	N/A	Robert Iwaszkiewicz
United Kingdom	Brexit Party	14 / 73	EFDD, NI	Tim Aker, Jonathan Arnott, Jonathan Bullock, David Coburn, Jane Collins, Bill Etheridge, Nigel Farage, Ray Finch, Nathan Gill, Diane James, Paul Nuttall, Margot Parker, Julia Reid, and Jill Seymour; Former UKIP MEPs
United Kingdom	Social Democratic Party	1 / 73	EFDD	Patrick O'Flynn; Former UKIP MEP
United Kingdom	Libertarian Party	0 / 73	N/A	Bill Etheridge; Switched to Brexit Party in 2019
United Kingdom	Independent MEPs	3 / 73	EFDD, NI	Louise Bours, James Carver and William Dartmouth; Former UKIP MEPs

== Leadership ==
- Chair/Co-president: Nigel Farage (2014–2019)
- Chair/Co-president: David Borrelli (2014–2017)
- Chair of the Bureau: (United Kingdom) Roger Helmer
- Vice-chair: (France) Joëlle Bergeron
- Vice-chair: (Italy) Piernicola Pedicini
- Vice-chair: (Poland) Robert Jarosław Iwaszkiewicz
- Vice-chair: (Lithuania) Rolandas Paksas
- Treasurer: (Italy) Tiziana Beghin

== Political positions ==
The bloc's primary goal was the reduction in the powers of, or even the dissolution of, the European Union. Nigel Farage, the bloc's president, was also the leader of the UK Independence Party and latterly the Brexit Party, both of which advocated for the immediate withdrawal of the UK from the European Union.

During the European Parliament debate about Catalan independence referendum in 2017, the EFDD, by the voice of Ray Finch considered that European Union should have made some intervention against Spain to protect Catalan independence. He considered that this referendum led to human rights abuses. According to him, people should have the right to vote even when the referendum is illegal.

== See also ==
- European Alliance of Peoples and Nations
