= 2014 Party of European Socialists presidential primaries =

The 2014 Party of European Socialists presidential primaries is the selection process by which the members of the Party of European Socialists (PES) and will choose the PES candidate for President of the European Commission ahead of the 2014 European elections.

== Context ==
Partly due to reluctance among some national delegations, the Party of European Socialists (PES) did not present any candidate for the post of Commission President to the European elections of June 2009. Following the disappointing results of PES member parties during these elections, however, the European People's Party (EPP) remained the largest party in the European Parliament, and their candidate José Manuel Durão Barroso was re-elected as Commission President. In light of this, the PES Congress of Prague of December 2009 made the decision that PES would designate its own candidate before the 2014 European elections.

A few months afterwards, in June 2010, several PES supporters launched an online campaign for a PES primary which rapidly gained momentum on social networks. Led by Desmond O'Toole, José Reis Santos and Arthur Colin, the campaign managed to convince the PES Council meeting in Warsaw in December 2010 to set up Working Group "Candidate 2014" in charge of proposing a procedure and timetable for a "democratic" and "transparent" designation process. The Council accepted to "bring on board all PES member parties and all levels within the parties" in the selection process.

One year later, basing on the working group's conclusions, a PES Council gathering in Brussels in November 2011 decided that PES would designate its candidate for Commission president through primaries taking place in January 2014 in each of its member parties and organisations, before a ratification of the results by an Extraordinary PES Congress in Rome in February 2014.

== Process ==
The general procedure of the PES primary is detailed in the PES Resolution "Selecting our common candidate in 2014" adopted by the PES Council on 24 November 2011.

Six months before the process is launched, the timetable of the primary will be readjusted by the PES Presidency according to the exact date decided by the Council of the EU for the 2014 European elections.

=== Nomination process ===
Delegates with voting rights to the ninth PES Congress 2012
Party or organisation		Delegates
S&D Group in the European Parliament		28
Germany	SPD	28
Spain	PSOE	27
United Kingdom	Labour	22
United Kingdom	SDLP	2
France	PS	23
Italy	DS	20
Italy	PS	3
Poland	SLD	17
Poland	UP	3
Romania	PSD	14
Czech Republic	CSSD	11
Greece	PASOK	11
Portugal	PS	11
Belgium	PS	6
Belgium	sp.a	5
Netherlands	PvdA	10
Hungary	MSzP	8
Hungary	MSzDP	2
Sweden	SAP	9
Austria	SPÖ	9
Bulgaria	BSP	8
Slovakia	SMER	8
Denmark	SD	7
Ireland	Labour	7
Lithuania	LSDP	7
Norway	DNA	7
Finland	SDP	6
Malta	MLP	5
Cyprus	EDEK	4
Estonia	SDE	4
Luxembourg	LSAP	4
Slovenia	SD	4
Latvia	LSDSP	3
PES Group in the Committee of the Regions		3
Young European Socialists (Youth organisation)		3
PES Women (Women's organisation)		3
Foundation for European Progressive Studies (Political foundation)		3
PES President		1
PES Secretary general		1
Total		355

First, a nomination process will determine which candidates are eligible for the primary. It follows three steps:

- 1–31 October 2013: Opening of nominations. Candidates will have to send their candidacies, one letter of nomination, and five letters of support to the PES secretariat.

Anyone meeting the nomination criteria can stand as a candidate:

- Be nominated by a PES full member party or organisation.
- Be supported by 15% of PES full member parties or organisations (nominating party or organisation included), including his/her party or a party from his/her country if he/she is not a member of a PES full member party.
- A party can only nominate or support one potential candidate.

These criteria will allow for a maximum of six candidates. In November 2011, the PES had 33 full member parties and 5 full member organisations. In these conditions, a candidate would need the support from 6 parties or organisations: one nominating her/him, 5 other supporting.

- October 2013: A PES Leaders' Conference will take place to examine the nomination process.
- 6 November 2013: Official opening of the campaign and the announcement of candidates.

The PES Presidency will meet to close the nomination process, check candidacies, make the candidacies public, and set up an electoral committee composed of representatives from each potential candidate to scrutinise the fairness of the process.

=== Votes in member parties and organisations ===
- 1 December – 31 January 2014: Once the list of potential candidates is finalised, votes on the candidates will be organised in each full member party and organisation.

Each party or organisation determines its own voting process according to its traditions. Nevertheless, they will have to respect the following principles:

- Direct or indirect consultation of individual members,
- Ratification of the result by a democratically elected body of the party or organisation,
- Proportionality of votes within each delegation.

=== Results and their ratification ===
- February 2014: The PES will convene an extraordinary Congress in Rome to ratify the election of the candidate and to vote upon the Manifesto.

The results of the votes of member parties and organisations will first be aggregated at the PES Congress. To consolidate them, the votes of full member parties and organisations will be weighted on the basis of the breakdown of delegates in the PES Congress established according to the PES Statutes. If a candidate obtains an absolute majority of the weighted votes, he or she will be ratified by the PES Congress.
If no candidate obtains an absolute majority, a second round will be held between the two first candidates in the PES Congress by open ballot.

== Voting procedures in member parties and organisations ==
=== France – PS ===
From November 2011 on, several leaders of France's Socialist Party have advocated for an open primary to determine the French vote on the PES candidate. They included former Prime Minister of France Michel Rocard and former vice-president of the European Parliament Pierre Moscovici.

== Candidates ==
Mid-2013, the following leaders were considered to be possible presidential PES candidates for 2014:

- Martin Schulz – German politician and Member of the European Parliament for the Social Democratic Party of Germany, since 2004 leader of the Socialists in the European Parliament Progressive Alliance of Socialists and Democrats in the Parliament, since 2012 President of the European Parliament. Has been called "a person standing firm for our values, which express the real needs of the people" by PES President Sergei Stanishev in a press briefing at an earlier PES party council in June 2013. Is viewed as a clear front runner as of the beginning of the nomination process.
- José Luis Zapatero – former Prime Minister of Spain 2004 to 2011.
- Helle Thorning Schmidt – incumbent Prime Minister of Denmark since 2011.
- Frans Timmermans – incumbent Dutch Minister of Foreign Affairs since 2012.
- Pascal Lamy – incumbent Director-General of the World Trade Organization since 2005.
