= Arndt Kohn =

German politician (born 1980)

Arndt Kohn MEP a. D.
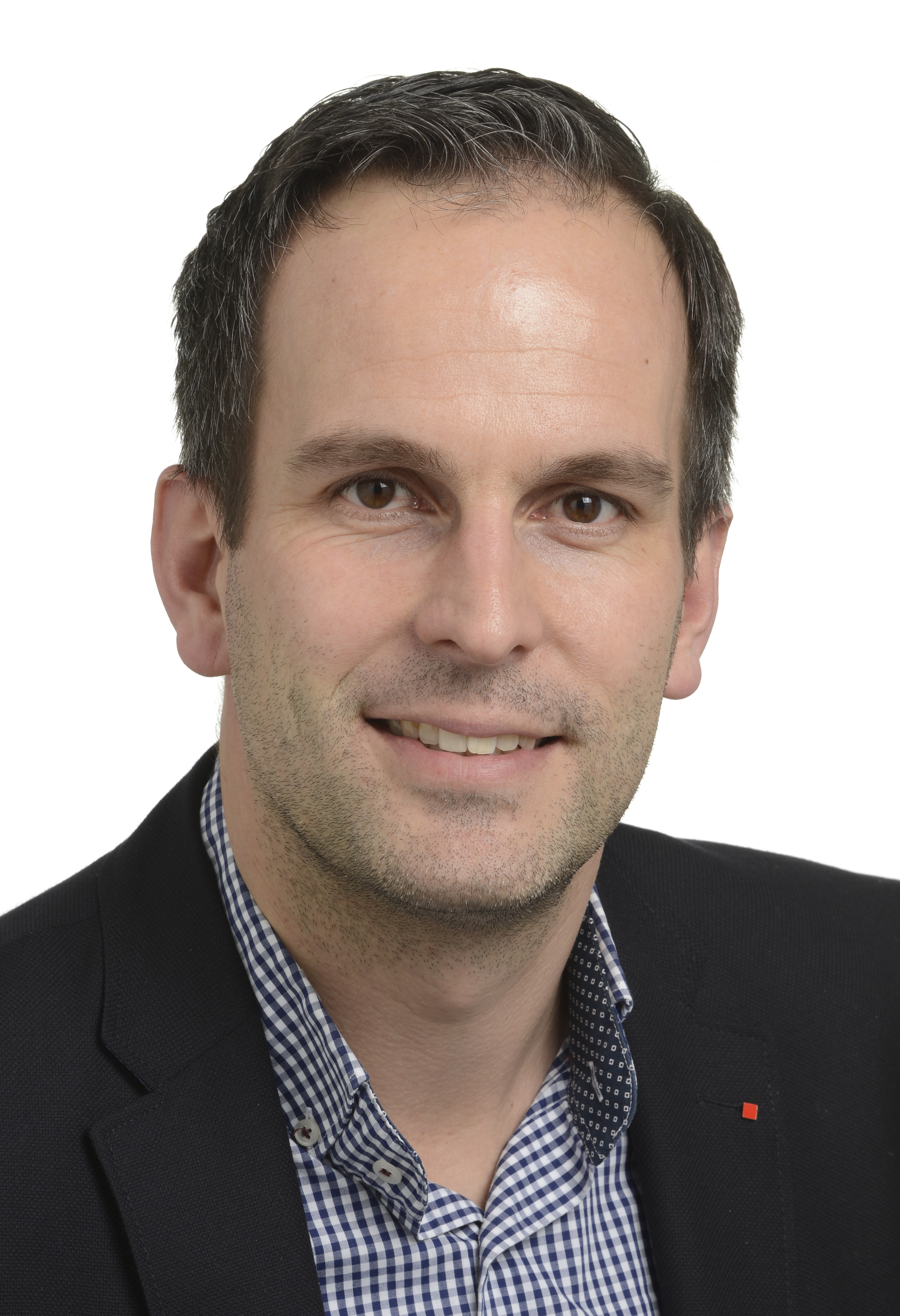

Member of the European Parliament for Germany
- In office 24 February 2017 – 2 July 2019
- Preceded by: Martin Schulz
- Succeeded by: multi-member district

Personal details
- Born: 3 September 1980 (age 46) Stolberg, North Rhine-Westphalia, West Germany
- Party: German; Social Democratic Party; European Union; Party of European Socialists
- Children: 2
- Education: Hochschule für Finanzen Nordrhein-Westfalen
- Occupation: Politician; Bank Teller; Civil Servant
- Website: Official website

Arndt Kohn (born 3 September 1980) is a German politician who served as a Member of the European Parliament from 2017 until 2019. He is a member of the Social Democratic Party, part of the Party of European Socialists.

He replaced Martin Schulz, the former President of the European Parliament after Schulz resigned to contest the 2017 German federal election.

== Parliamentary service ==
- Member, Committee on Budgetary Control (2017-2019)
- Member, Delegation to the EU-Albania Stabilisation and Association Parliamentary Committee (2017-2019)

== Other activities ==
- German Federation for the Environment and Nature Conservation (BUND), Member
