= Martin Schulz =

German politician (born 1955)

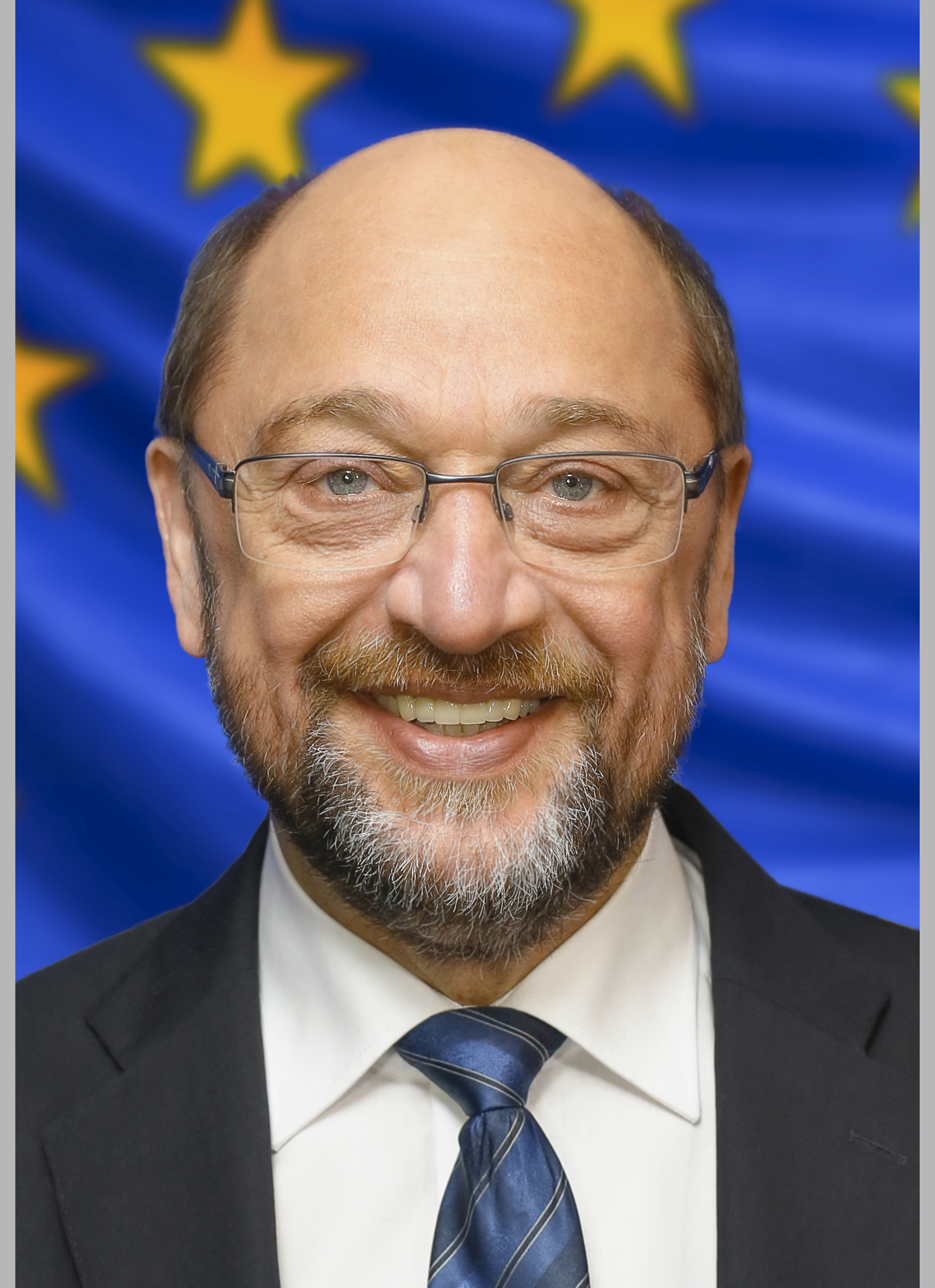
- Schulz in 2012

Chair of the Friedrich Ebert Foundation
- Incumbent
- Assumed office 14 December 2020
- Deputy: Daniela Kolbe; Michael Sommer
- Preceded by: Kurt Beck

Leader of the Social Democratic Party
- In office 19 March 2017 – 13 February 2018
- General Secretary: Hubertus Heil; Lars Klingbeil
- Deputy: Ralf Stegner; Thorsten Schäfer-Gümbel; Olaf Scholz; Manuela Schwesig; Natascha Kohnen; Malu Dreyer
- Preceded by: Sigmar Gabriel
- Succeeded by: Andrea Nahles

President of the European Parliament
- In office 17 January 2012 – 17 January 2017
- Vice President: Gianni Pittella; Antonio Tajani
- Preceded by: Jerzy Buzek
- Succeeded by: Antonio Tajani

Leader of the Progressive Alliance of Socialists and Democrats
- Acting; 18 June 2014 – 1 July 2014
- Preceded by: Hannes Swoboda
- Succeeded by: Gianni Pittella
- In office 15 July 2004 – 17 January 2012
- Preceded by: Enrique Barón Crespo
- Succeeded by: Hannes Swoboda

Mayor of Würselen
- In office 1987–1998
- Preceded by: Bernd Thielen
- Succeeded by: Wolfgang Peltzer
Parliamentary constituencies
Member of the Bundestag for North Rhine-Westphalia
In office 24 October 2017 – 26 October 2021
Preceded by	Peer Steinbrück (2016)
Succeeded by	Multi-member district
Electoral list	Social Democratic Party
Member of the European Parliament for Germany
In office 19 July 1994 – 19 February 2017
Preceded by	Multi-member district
Succeeded by	Arndt Kohn

Personal details
- Born: 20 December 1955 (age 70) Kinzweiler-Hehlrath, North Rhine-Westphalia, West Germany (now Eschweiler-Hehlrath, Germany)
- Party: Social Democratic Party (1975–present)
- Spouse: Inge Schulz (m. 1985)
- Children: 2
- Website: Official Website

Martin Schulz (born 20 December 1955) is a German politician who was a Member of the European Parliament (MEP) from Germany from 1994 to 2017 and a Member of the Bundestag (MdB) from 2017 to 2021. During his tenure he was Leader of the Progressive Alliance of Socialists and Democrats from 2004 to 2012, President of the European Parliament from 2012 to 2017 and Leader of the Social Democratic Party from 2017 to 2018.

In November 2016, Schulz announced he would not seek a third term as President of the European Parliament, but instead would stand in 2017 as the SPD candidate for the German chancellorship. In January 2017, Sigmar Gabriel announced he would not stand for re-election as party leader and as the SPD candidate for the German chancellorship, Gabriel recommended Schulz as his replacement.

After the elections of September 2017, which resulted in a postwar low for the SPD, Schulz declared the end of the existing Grand coalition under Angela Merkel and explicitly refused to serve in a Merkel government. On 7 February 2018, coalition talks concluded and Schulz announced he would succeed Sigmar Gabriel as foreign minister and leave his party chairmanship to Andrea Nahles. After heavy public and internal criticism, Schulz decided not to enter the new cabinet. On 13 February 2018 Schulz stepped down as party chair.

== Early life ==
Martin Schulz was born in the village of Hehlrath, which is now a part of Eschweiler in western Rhineland, near the Dutch and Belgian borders, as one of five children. His father, Albert Schulz, was a local policeman and belonged to a social democratic family; his mother, Clara, belonged to a conservative Catholic family and was active in the Christian Democratic Union. Having grown up in the border area between Germany, Belgium and the Netherlands, Schulz has relatives in all three countries.

After four years at primary school, from 1962 to 1966, Schulz attended the Heilig-Geist (Holy Spirit) gymnasium, a private Roman Catholic school run by the Holy Ghost Fathers (or Spiritans), in Broich (now Würselen), a district of the town of Broichweiden, for nine years. As a teenager, he went to France on a school exchange programme. He left school without passing his Abitur after failing the 11th grade twice.

From 1975 to 1977 Schulz then trained to be a bookseller. The next two years he worked for a number of publishing houses and bookshops. In 1980 Schulz suffered from alcoholism. After a successful rehab Schulz opened his own bookshop in Würselen in 1982.

== Early career in municipal politics, 1987–1998 ==
In 1974, at the age of 19, Schulz joined the SPD, became involved with the Young Socialists and in 1984 was elected to the Würselen Municipal Council, remaining a member for just over two electoral terms, to 1998, from 1987 onwards as mayor. At 31, he was then the youngest mayor in North Rhine-Westphalia. He held that office until 1998. As a municipal counselor he initiated the twinning of Würselen with the city of Morlaix in French Brittany, where he became friends with Marylise Lebranchu, who was the mayor and later became French Minister of Justice (2000–2002) and Minister for Public Services (2012–2016).

== Member of the European Parliament (MEP), 1994–2017 ==
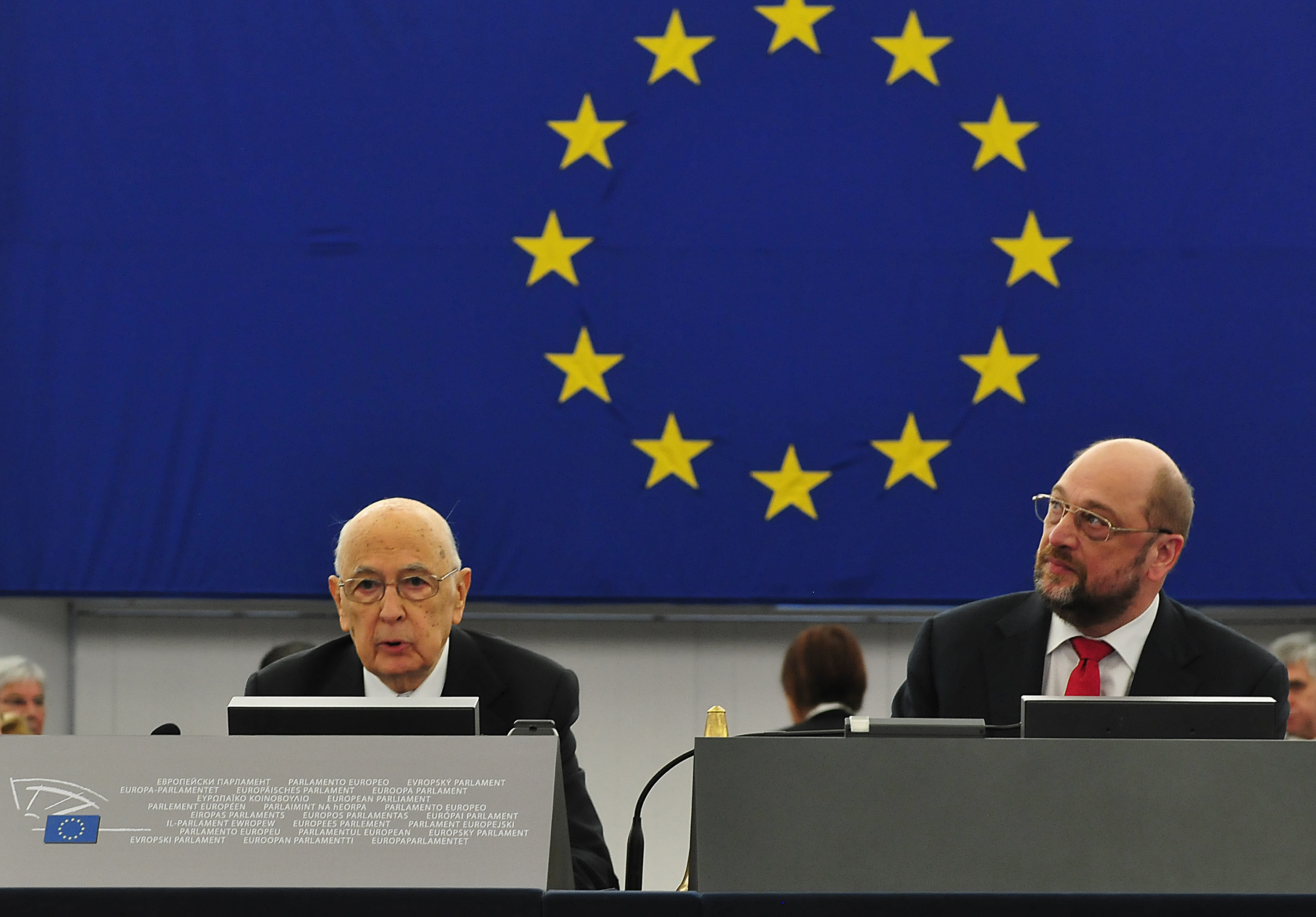
Martin Schulz with Italian President Giorgio Napolitano in 2014

In the 1994 European elections Schulz was elected to the European Parliament and between 2000 and 2004 was chair of the SPD delegation. Schulz has served on a number of committees, including the Committee on Civil Liberties, Justice and Home Affairs and the Subcommittee on Human Rights. He led the German delegation of the Socialist group (SPD members) from 2000 and was also a vice-chair of the Socialist Group in the EP. He was elected group leader in 2004, of the PSE Group, succeeding the Spaniard Enrique Barón Crespo, a position held until he was elected EP president. Since 2009, Schulz has also acted as the representative for European Affairs for Germany's SPD party and his views have deeply influenced his party's pro-European politics.

In 2004 as Leader of the S&D group, Schulz introduced a motion in the European Parliament to refuse to give approval/consent to the Barroso Commission on the basis of the proposed appointment of Italian nominee Rocco Buttiglione and his publicly expressed homophobic views. A large majority of MEPs from the other political groups followed and consequently Buttiglione was withdrawn and replaced by Franco Frattini.

By 2008, SPD chairman Kurt Beck has said he wanted Schulz to succeed Günter Verheugen as Germany's EU commissioner following the 2009 European elections; the post eventually went to Günther Oettinger.

=== President of the European Parliament, 2012–2017 ===
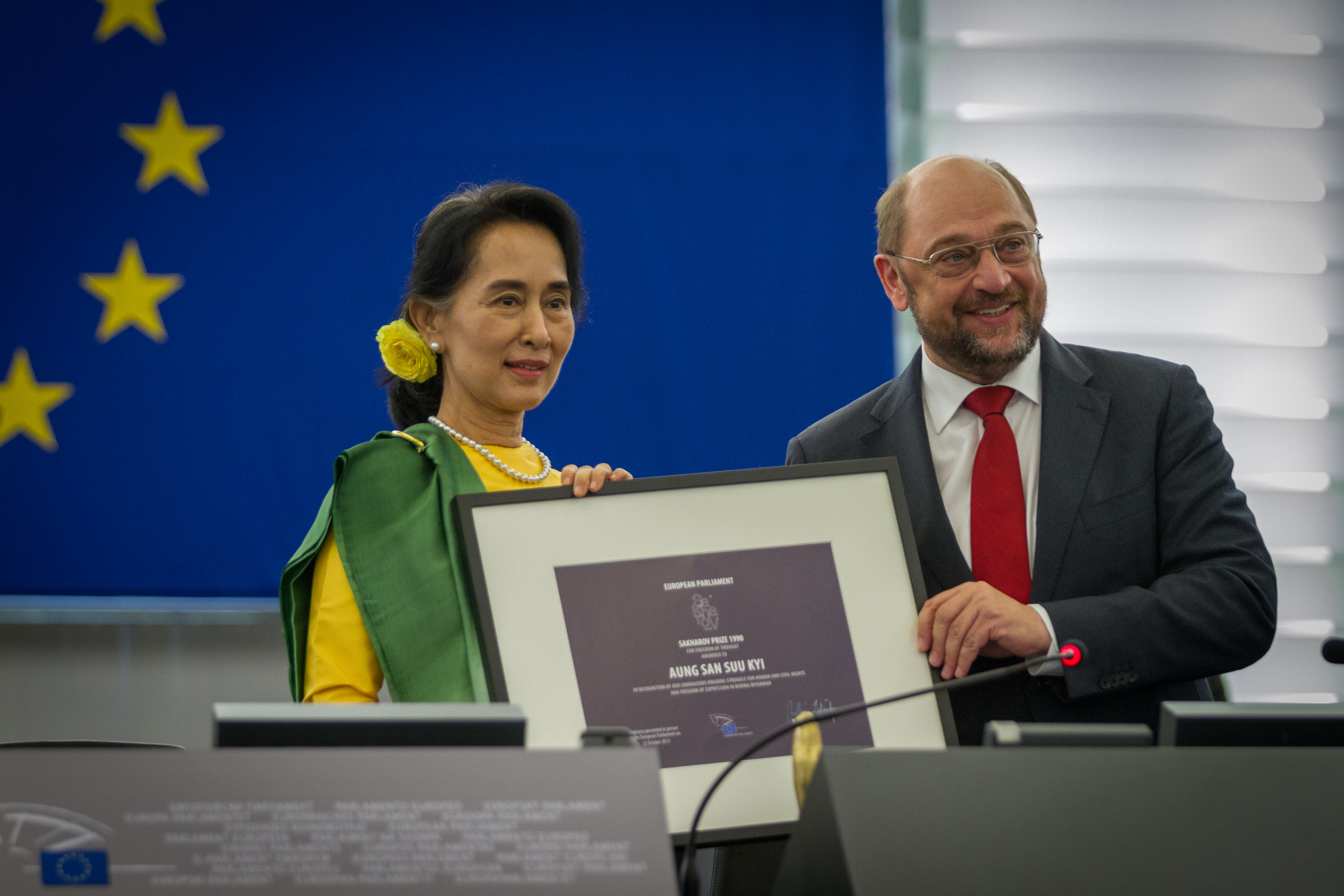
The ceremony of the Sakharov Prize awarded to Aung San Suu Kyi by Schulz, inside the European Parliament's Strasbourg hemicycle, in 2013

Following the 2009 European elections Schulz came to public attention when he insisted that his group should not immediately approve a second term of office for European Commission President Jose Manuel Barroso and instead, together with the chair of the Green Group in the European Parliament, Daniel Cohn-Bendit, proposed the Belgian Liberal Guy Verhofstadt as a candidate for that office. Following reassurances by Barroso, Schulz dropped his categorical opposition to him, insisting only that he should make certain political concessions to the Social Democrats. As a result, the majority of the group abstained on the confidence vote to Barroso.

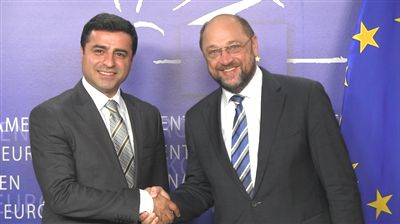
Schulz meeting with the Turkish opposition politician Selahattin Demirtaş, who was later arrested

On 15 September 2011, members of the Progressive Alliance of Socialists and Democrats in the European Parliament unanimously nominated Schulz as their candidate for the president of the European Parliament. On 17 January 2012, Schulz was elected as President of the European Parliament, with 387 votes in favour out of 670 cast. Other candidates were Nirj Deva (142 votes) and Diana Wallis (141 votes).

Together with EU Commission President Barroso and EU Council President Herman van Rompuy, Schulz collected the 2012 Nobel Peace Prize on behalf of the European Union. The Prize, honoring "over six decades [having] contributed to the advancement of peace and reconciliation, democracy and human rights in Europe", was awarded by a unanimous decision of the Norwegian Nobel Committee.

As president of European Parliament, Schulz proved extremely adept at delicate diplomatic missions, such as his visit with Turkish president Recep Tayyip Erdoğan following the 2016 coup attempt and his visit with Iranian president Hassan Rohani in November 2015 to "intensify dialogue" between the EU and Iran a few months after the signing of the Joint Comprehensive Plan of Action.

In November 2016, Schulz announced that he would not run for a third term in January 2017, and instead return to German politics. He resigned his seat on 10 February 2017, leaving the European Parliament after more than twenty-two years.

=== Candidacy for President of the European Commission ===
On 6 November 2013, Schulz was nominated as "candidate designate" by the Party of European Socialists – at the time the second-largest group in the 750-seat parliament –, with the aim to become the first candidate to be elected President of the European Commission by democratic elections. He was unopposed, as no other candidate stepped forward to challenge him in the race to be the socialist campaign figurehead. This kicked off a tour to all member states and particularly all member parties.

On 1 March 2014, Schulz accepted the nomination of the Party of European Socialists in Rome. He was elected by 368 PES members out of 404, with only 2 votes against him. Prior to the vote, in what was widely seen as a clear signal to its European partners on the left that there are limits to their support for the EU, Britain's Labour Party had publicly spoken out against Schulz as the left's candidate, instead favouring Helle Thorning-Schmidt of Denmark's Social Democrats. Schulz launched his European campaign on 17 April in front of 1,600 socialist activists in Paris, promising to tackle taxes and social dumping. He ran against Conservative Jean-Claude Juncker, then Prime Minister of Luxembourg, and Liberal Guy Verhofstadt.

However, when the Socialists came second in the European election behind the centre-right European People's Party (EPP), Germany's Social Democrats announced that they would accept one of Chancellor Angela Merkel's conservatives taking the German post on the European Commission if Schulz remained president of the European Parliament. The decision to back Juncker for the Commission's presidency instead was later endorsed at an informal meeting in Paris of eight Social Democratic leaders, including Thorning-Schmidt, Sigmar Gabriel of Germany and Werner Faymann of Austria. Accordingly, Schulz did not join the European Commission but remained in his current position.

== Domestic politics ==
Since 1999, Schulz has been part of the SPD leadership under party chairmen Gerhard Schröder (1999–2004), Franz Müntefering (2004–05 and 2008–09), Matthias Platzeck (2005–06), Kurt Beck (2006–08) and Sigmar Gabriel (2009–17). Within the party, he serves as co-chairman of the Commission for International Politics, alongside Niels Annen. Schulz was an SPD delegate to the Federal Convention for the purpose of electing the President of Germany in 2004, 2009, 2010 and 2012. In the negotiations to form a coalition government following the 2013 federal elections, he was part of the wider leadership circle chaired by Angela Merkel, Horst Seehofer and Sigmar Gabriel. He also led the SPD delegation in the working group on European affairs; his co-chair of the CDU/CSU was fellow MEP Herbert Reul.

During his 2014 campaign for the Presidency of the European Commission, Schulz established himself as a regular presence in German media on issues unconnected to the European Parliament elections that year. By 2015, German newspapers speculated that Schulz was interested in running for the chancellorship of Germany in the 2017 federal elections. In May 2016, he told weekly newspaper Welt am Sonntag that he would not enter the race to succeed Angela Merkel. In November 2016, Schulz announced that he would not seek a third term as president of the European Parliament, but would instead run for a seat on the German parliament in the 2017 elections, which reignited the chancellorship speculations. On 24 January 2017, Schulz was confirmed as the Social Democrats' candidate for chancellor.

=== 2017 federal election ===
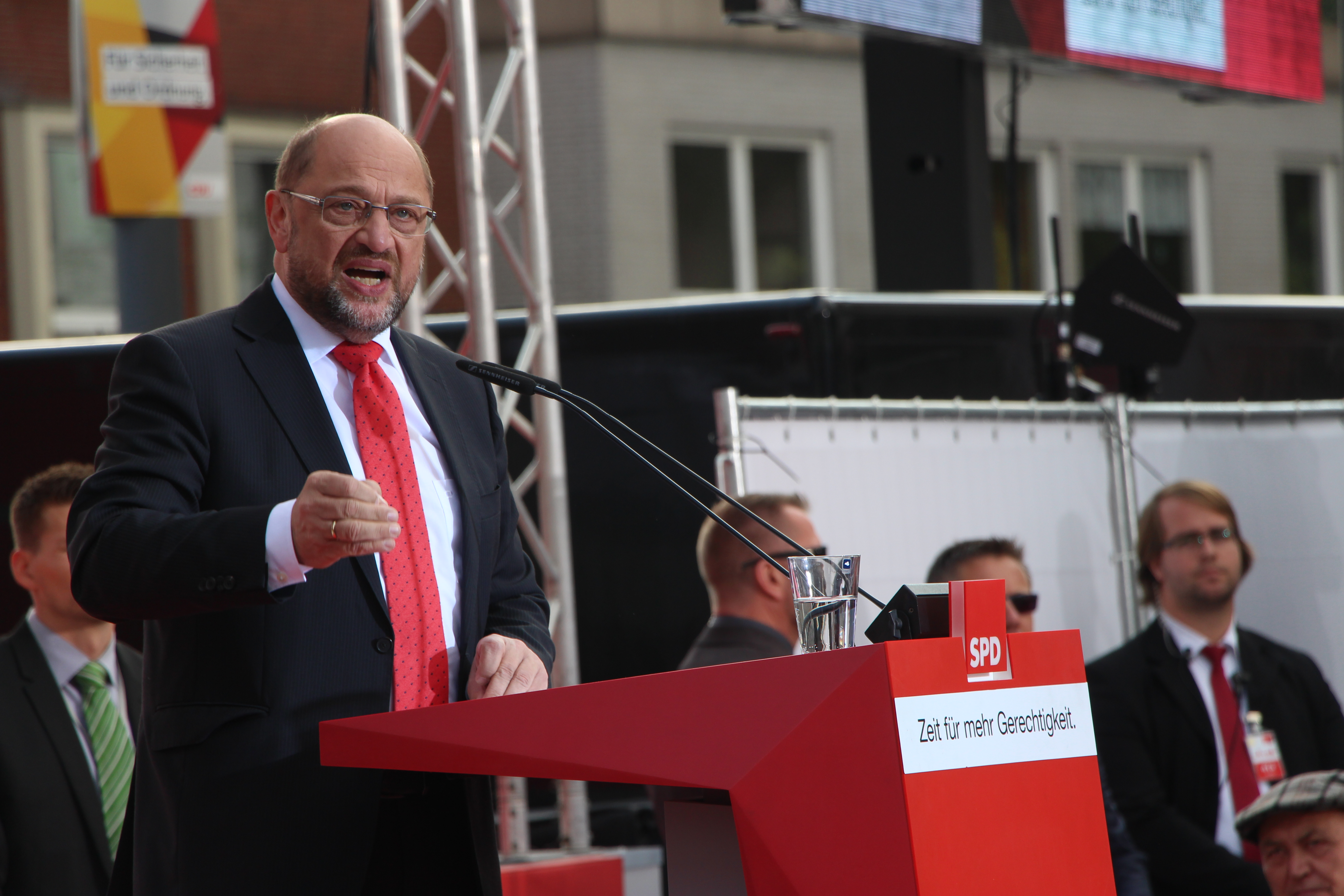
Schulz in Gelsenkirchen, 20 September 2017

On 24 January 2017, Schulz became the Social Democrats' candidate for chancellor in that year's Federal election. In March he was unanimously chosen as official head of the party, the first time in post-war Germany a leader of the SPD received no dissenting vote. Following the announcement of his nomination, his party gained an average of ten percentage points in public opinion polls. For a short period of time the SPD was close to the Union parties of Chancellor Merkel, during this time political observers regarded it possible that Schulz could unseat Merkel in the federal election on 24 September 2017. Polls also showed Schulz leading Merkel if Germans could elect their chancellor directly.

With unemployment hitting new lows each month during the campaign, Schulz later struggled to gain traction with a message focusing on the ills of inequality in Germany. Shortly before the election, he refocused his campaign on the risk of a rekindled European migrant crisis. In July 2017, illness forced Schulz's campaign manager and friend Markus Engels to step down. In the federal elections on 24 September 2017, the Social Democrats slumped to 20.5 percent, a new postwar low.

=== Aftermath of the 2017 federal election ===
Within an hour of the first exit poll, Schulz confirmed statements by other senior party figures that the SPD would not renew its Grand coalition with the CDU under Angela Merkel but head into opposition. Schulz explicitly refused to serve in a Merkel government. However, after the attempt to form a "Jamaica coalition" between CDU/CSU, FDP and Greens failed in November 2017 and President Steinmeier asked him to reconsider, Schulz reversed his position and began coalition talks with the CDU/CSU parties.

In February 2018, these coalition talks concluded successfully and Schulz announced he would succeed incumbent foreign minister Sigmar Gabriel as foreign minister. After heavy public and internal criticism, Schulz stepped down as SPD Leader on 13 February 2018 and proposed Andrea Nahles as his replacement; and shortly thereafter he also gave up his attempt to become foreign minister. The attempt to install Nahles as acting party leader faced severe criticism from several regional party associations as well as experts in constitutional law. The party executive nominated Nahles as the new leader, with Olaf Scholz, as the longest-serving deputy, taking over as acting party leader until the party conference on 22 April 2018.

In December 2020, Schulz announced that he would not stand in the 2021 federal elections but instead resign from active politics by the end of the parliamentary term. At the same time, he was elected to chair the Friedrich Ebert Foundation - a position he occupies to this day.

== Political positions ==
=== European integration ===
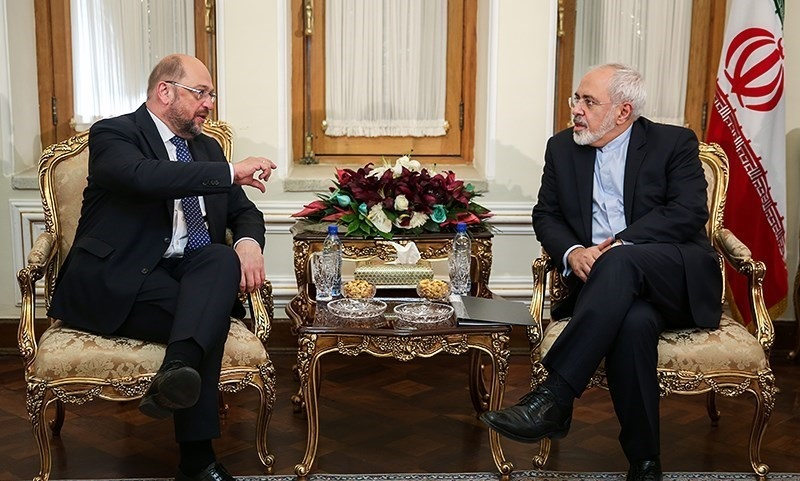
Schulz meeting with Iranian foreign minister Mohammad Javad Zarif in Tehran

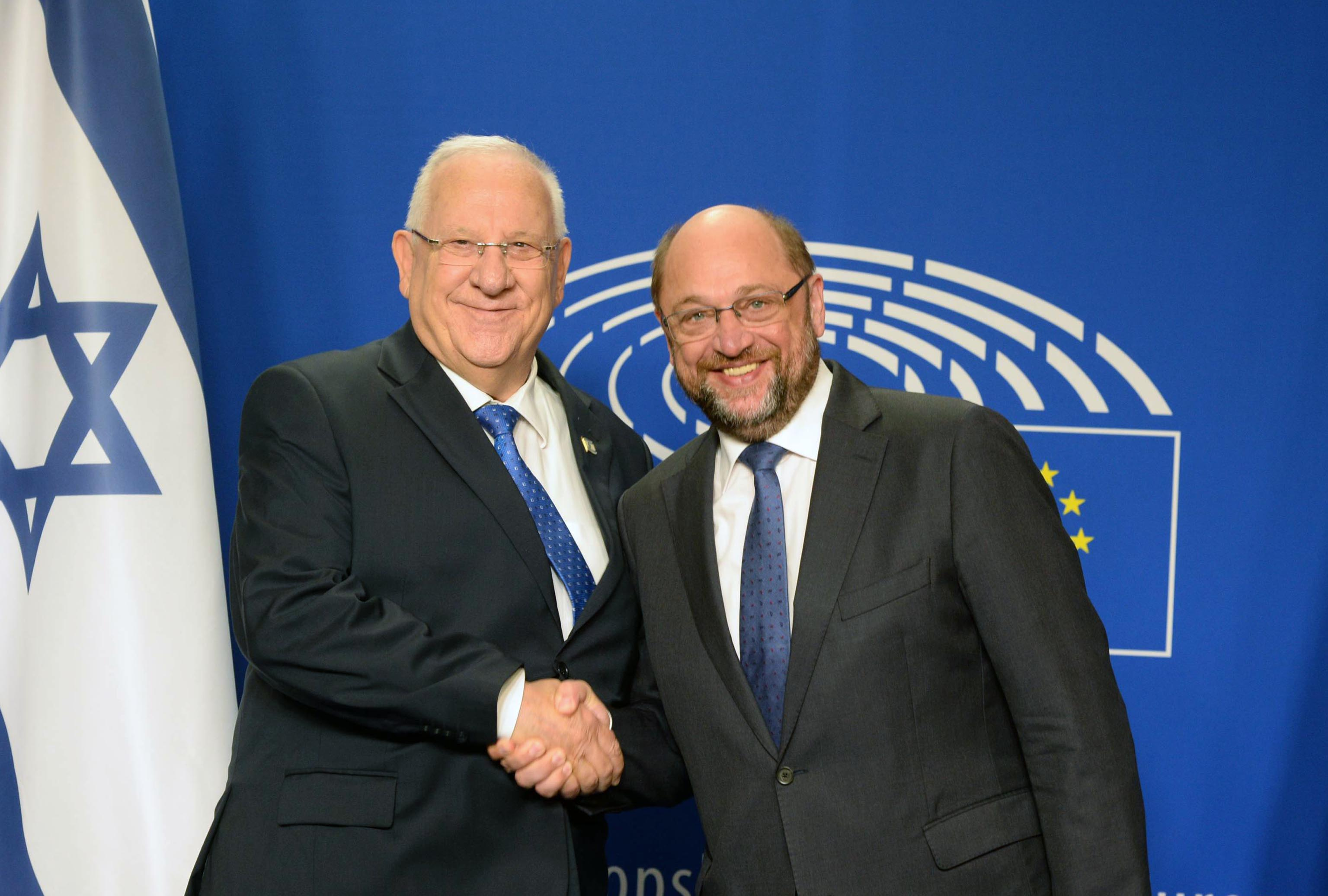
Schulz meeting with Israeli President Reuven Rivlin in Brussels

Schulz is widely considered an ardent EU supporter. He has hailed European unification as being civilization's greatest achievement over the past century. In 2014, however, he argued it was also essential that responsibility was delegated away from Brussels and down to national, regional and local authorities, allowing the EU to focus on the big issues. As a result of Schulz's pro-Europeanism, both supporters and detractors have linked him with the slogan "MEGA" – "Make Europe Great Again" – as a parody of US president Donald Trump's "Make America Great Again".

Schulz is committed to strengthening Europe and the European institutions. In 2016, he presented a ten-point plan for a reform of the EU with Vice Chancellor Sigmar Gabriel. It calls for a "streamlining" of European structures and the establishment of a strong European government under the control of the European Parliament.

Schulz has often emphasised that the European Union is the best way to banish the "demons of the twentieth century", such as racism, xenophobia and antisemitism.

After the United Kingdom voted to leave the European Union in a membership referendum, Schulz warned in mid-2016: "If we break the instruments with which we banish the demons, we will set them free again." He is one of the 27 initiators of the Charter of Digital Fundamental Rights published in November 2016 Of the European Union.

In December 2017, Schulz called for a new constitutional treaty for a "United States of Europe". He proposed that this constitution should be written by "a convention that includes civil society and the people" and that any state that declined to accept this proposed constitution should have to leave the bloc. His proposal is "likely to be met with some resistance from Merkel and other EU leaders".

=== Security policy ===
In front of the European Council on 19 December 2013, Schulz took responsibility for the initiation of the Cox-Kwaśniewski mission to Ukraine. In the same speech, he noted that Europe was still militarily dependent on the US, and that in many cases Europe would be quite incapable of carrying out a military operation without the support of the US.

Schulz was quoted in a newspaper report of his speech as having said: "If we wish to defend our values and interests, if we wish to maintain the security of our citizens, then a majority of MEPs consider that we need a headquarters for civil and military missions in Brussels and deployable troops," The External Action Service of HRUFASP Catherine Ashton had prepared a proposal, which was supported by France, Spain, Italy, Poland and Germany who together have QMV majority, to create a European Air Force composed of surveillance drones, heavy transport airplanes, and air-to-air refuelling planes. The debate was joined with a view presented by NATO Secretary General Anders Fogh Rasmussen, who maintained that "Nato will remain the bedrock of Euro-Atlantic security." Rasmussen's view prevailed on the Council at this time because QMV does not take effect in decisions of the European Council until 1 November 2014.

=== Economy ===
Schulz believes that dignified work is a value in itself. For that reason, he says, he is not a proponent of the concept of unconditional basic income. However, Schulz is much in favour of decent wage agreements, secure and lasting jobs, employee participation in decision-making and the examination of the social justification for claims and payments.

=== Foreign affairs ===
In an effort to improve relations between Europe and Cuba, Schulz led a European Parliament delegation to Havana for talks with Carlos Lage Dávila on lifting EU sanction against the countries in 2008.

In 2014, Schulz delivered a speech to the Israeli Knesset, in which he criticised Israel for denying Palestinians a fair share of water resources in the occupied West Bank. The speech sparked a walk-out by several lawmakers from the Jewish Home party, and drew a public rebuke from Prime Minister Benjamin Netanyahu.

In 2015, amid the Russo-Ukrainian War, Schulz suspended a committee made up of Russian and EU lawmakers that meets several times a year to improve ties. When Russia barred entry to two politicians from the EU who had planned to attend the funeral in 2015 of murdered opposition figure Boris Nemtsov, Schulz criticised the barring as "a high affront to EU–Russia relations and the work of democratic institutions".

In 2016, Schulz stated that Donald Trump is a problem "for the whole world," and linked the Trump phenomenon to far-right populism in Europe. He called Trump an "irresponsible man" who "boasts about not having a clue".

== Other activities ==
- Business Forum of the Social Democratic Party of Germany, Member of the Political Advisory Board (since 2020)
- Bonner Akademie für Forschung und Lehre praktischer Politik (BAPP), member of the board of trustees
- Friedrich Ebert Foundation (FES), chairman (since December 2020)
- Institute for European Politics, member of the board of trustees
- Stiftung "Achtung!Kinderseele", member of the board of trustees
- IG Bergbau, Chemie, Energie (IG BCE), Member
- 1. FC Köln, member of the advisory board (–2019)

== Controversy ==
=== Berlusconi incident ===
On 2 July 2003, one day after Italy taking over the rotating presidency of the Council of the EU, Schulz criticized Prime Minister Silvio Berlusconi of Italy of his domestic policy. Berlusconi replied:

Signor Schulz, so che in Italia c'è un produttore che sta montando un film sui campi di concentramento nazisti: la suggerirò per il ruolo di kapò. Lei è perfetto! In English: Mister Schulz, I know of a film-producer in Italy who is making a film about Nazi concentration-camps. I will recommend you for the role of a Kapo [concentration-camp inmate appointed as supervisor]. You are perfect!

Berlusconi later claimed he was referring to the comedy-series Hogan's Heroes, where a slow-witted character named Sgt. Hans Georg Schultz, played by John Banner, starred. Even though Berlusconi insisted that he was just being ironic, his comparisons with the Nazis caused a brief diplomatic rift between the two.

=== Incident with Godfrey Bloom ===
On 24 November 2010 the British MEP Godfrey Bloom caused a row in the European Parliament when he interrupted a speech by Martin Schulz, heckling him with the Nazi propaganda slogan Ein Volk, ein Reich, ein Führer ('one people, one empire, one leader') and accusing him of being an 'undemocratic fascist'. Bloom later stated that he was referring to the fact that the indoctrination of the German people under the Nazi regime has long-lasting effects; "some Germans still find it difficult to accept diversity in Europe and differences of opinion". In the debate on the future of the Euro Stability Pact Schulz had criticised the role played by the United Kingdom, which was involved in the discussions despite not being a member of the eurozone, and said that some eurosceptics would take pleasure in the collapse of the European Union. Following the incident, the president of Parliament, Jerzy Buzek, excluded Bloom from the Chamber. The Dutch MEP Barry Madlener, from the right-wing populist Partij voor de Vrijheid (PVV – Freedom Party), then protested against that decision, on the grounds that Schulz himself had recently described the PVV MEP Daniël van der Stoep as a fascist, but had not been excluded from the Chamber.

=== Campaign-related issues ===
Schulz received criticism after having transformed the Twitter account that his staff had built up for his European Parliament presidency into his own personal account in order to use it as part of his candidature to the EU Commission.

During his time as President of the European Parliament, Schulz removed a paragraph critical of his stewardship in a key committee report set for debate on 2 April 2014, thereby attracting a lot of negative attention. As a consequence, a large majority of the European Parliament voted on 4 April 2014 to invite Schulz to resign so that he would be able to campaign for the European elections.

Lastly, Schulz was criticized about the tax-free daily allowance of €304 the president of the Parliament received, until 18 April 2014, which he received while he was campaigning to become president of the commission. This was paid for 365 days a year, in addition to his salary of 200 thousand euros per year. A member of parliament receives this daily allowance only for attending.

=== Allegation of favoring close employees ===
In April 2017, the European Parliament, as part of its decision to discharge the financial year 2015, criticized two personnel matters where Schulz had been responsible for as President of Parliament. An employee of the parliament received an expatriation allowance of around 20,000 euros, even though his center of life had previously been in Berlin. The employee was a confidant of Schulz and later worked for the SPD as its campaign manager. Schulz was also accused of signing irregular promotions of close associates in a presidential decree that would have secured them financially advantageous posts beyond his departure. Schulz described the complaint as an election maneuver by "anti-Europeans, conservatives and Greens" and referred a decision of the European Anti-Fraud Office not to initiate an official investigation.

=== Foreign minister debate ===
On the day of the 2017 Federal Election, Schulz said he would under no circumstances become a minister of a government led by Angela Merkel or negotiate to form a Grand Coalition. After the SPD and Union parties finished their coalition talks on 6 February 2018, he made his intentions clear that he wanted to be foreign minister in the next government. This was met by heavy criticism from the party base, as Schulz was abandoning his word for a second time—the first being his vow not to enter coalition talks with Angela Merkel. The harshest criticism came from the incumbent foreign minister and his predecessor as SPD leader, Sigmar Gabriel. He accused Schulz and the Party leadership of not showing him the respect he deserves and being rude towards him. This public attack, coupled with internal pressure from the party leadership, led Schulz to retract prior statements and on 9 February 2018 he released a statement saying he would not enter into the new government; he resigned as leader of the SPD effective 13 February 2018.

== Personal life ==
Schulz is married and has two children, Nico and Lina. He was raised Catholic but is now lapsed.

He suffered a period of alcoholism as a young man, after a knee injury put an end to his hopes of playing football.

Besides German, Schulz speaks English, French, Spanish, Italian and Dutch with varying degrees of fluency.

== Honours and decorations ==
=== National honour ===
- Germany: Grand Cross of the Order of Merit of the Federal Republic of Germany in 2006
- Germany: International Charlemagne Prize of Aachen on 14 May 2015

=== Foreign honours ===
- Austria: Großes goldenes Ehrenzeichen der Republik in 2008
- Russian Federation : Honorary Doctorate by the Kaliningrad State Technical University on 18 May 2009
- France: Officer of the French Légion d'honneur in 2010
- Romania: Collar of the Chamber of Deputies of Romania on 31 October 2012; Doctor Honoris Causa title by the National School of Political Science and Public Administration of Bucharest on 31 October 2012.
- Italy: Knight Grand Cross of the Order of Merit of the Italian Republic on 10 November 2012
- Portugal: Key of Honor to the City of Lisbon on 20 June 2013
- Portugal: Grand Cross of the Order of Liberty on 17 January 2017
- Gold Medal of the Jean Monnet Foundation for Europe, in 2014.

=== South America ===
- Argentina: Grand Cross of the Order of the Liberator General San Martín, 22 August 2016

=== Asia ===
- Israel: Honorary PhD by Hebrew University of Jerusalem in 2014

Party political offices
Preceded by Enrique Barón Crespo	Leader of the Progressive Alliance of Socialists and Democrats; 2004–2012	Succeeded by Hannes Swoboda
Preceded by Sigmar Gabriel	Leader of the Social Democratic Party; 2017–2018	Succeeded by Olaf Scholz; Acting
Political offices
Preceded by Jerzy Buzek	President of the European Parliament; 2012–2017	Succeeded by Antonio Tajani
