= David Borrelli (politician) =

Italian politician

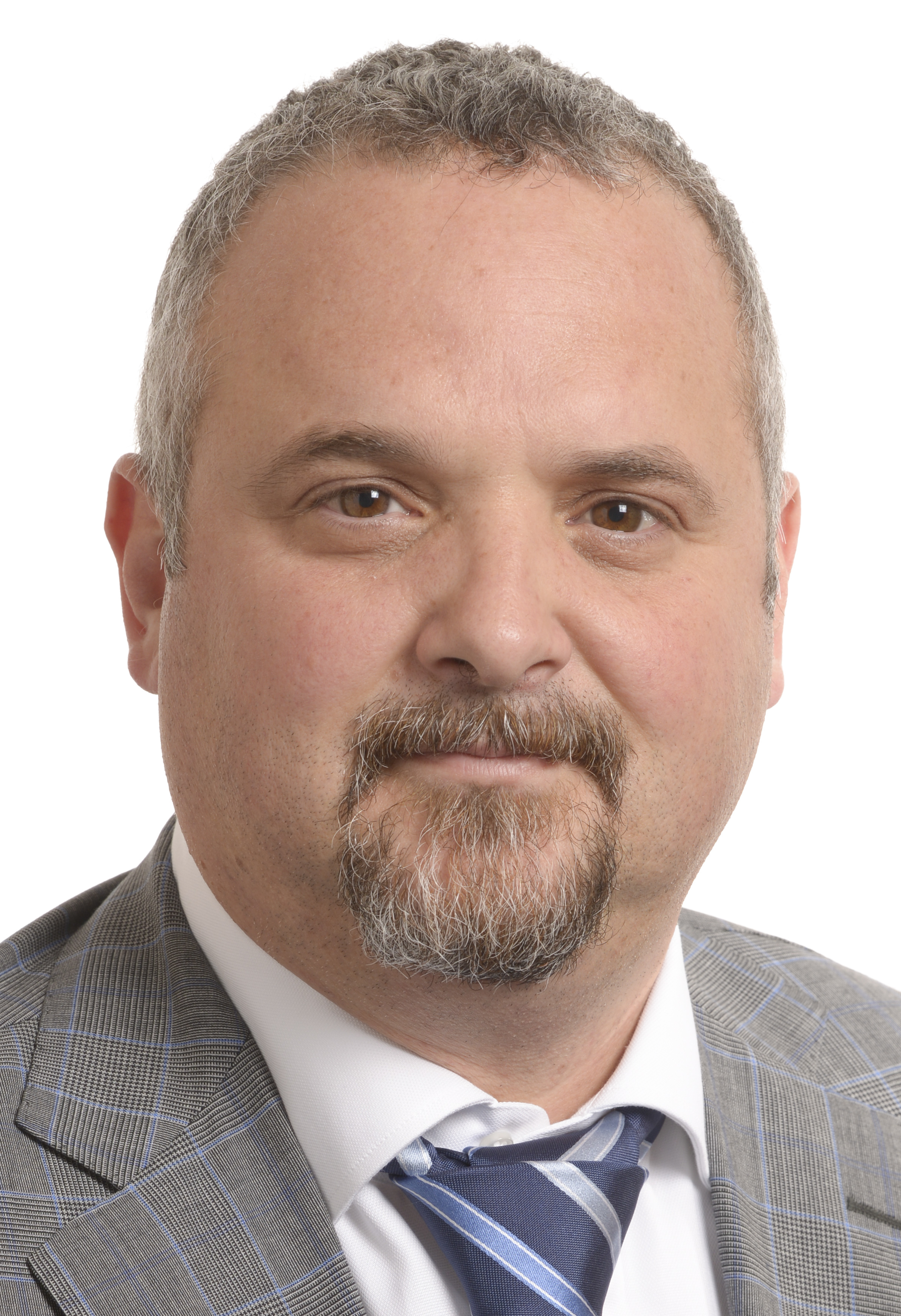

Chair of Europe of Freedom and Direct Democracy
- In office 20 October 2014 – 16 January 2017 Serving with Nigel Farage
- Preceded by: Position established

Member of the European Parliament for North-East Italy
- In office 25 May 2014 – 2 July 2019

Personal details
- Born: 28 April 1971 (age 54) Treviso, Veneto, Italy
- Party: Independent (since 2018)
- Other political affiliations: Five Star Movement (until 2018)

David Borrelli (born 28 April 1971) is an Italian politician and former member of the European Parliament.

== Biography ==
In 2005 Borrelli started the Meetup group "Grilli Treviso", which later merged into the M5S.

Borrelli was elected to Treviso city council in 2008 and served to 2013, the first M5S city councillor in a provincial capital. Working as a computer specialist, he co-founded an IT company in 2011.

In 2010 Borrelli ran for regional elections in Veneto, gathering 80.000 votes (3.16%) but was not elected.

In March 2014 Borrelli received 501 preferences at that online selections for M5S candidate MEPs. He was then elected to the European Parliament in the 2014 European election from North-East Italy with 26,090 preference votes.

He is a member of the European Parliament committees for International Trade (INTA) and for Industry, Research and Energy (ITRE), as well as of the European Parliament's Delegation for relations with the Mashreq countries, with South Africa, and of the Delegation to the Parliamentary Assembly of the Union for the Mediterranean.

He is a member of Rousseau Association which is responsible for the management of the core operating system of the Movement and he is responsible for LEX Europe, a piece of software for Rousseau OS that allows M5S supporters to propose amendments to the European legislation.

On 13 February 2018, Borrelli left the M5S and joined the Non-Inscrits group in the European Parliament.
