= Joëlle Bergeron =

French politician (born 1949)

Member of the European Parliament
- In office 2014–2019

Personal details
- Born: 28 June 1949 (age 77) Charlieu, France
- Party: National Front
- Education: Jean Monnet University; University of Western Brittany
- Political group: Europe of Freedom and Direct Democracy

Joëlle Bergeron (born 28 June 1949 in Charlieu) is a French politician and Member of the European Parliament (MEP). She became a card-carrying member of the National Front when it was created in 1972 and at the end of the 1970s she was responsible for the party's Brittany section. Her late husband Daniel Bergeron was a member of the Front National's Central Committee and a candidate for the party in national, regional and local elections and after he died, she took his place as Front National candidate for the 2011 cantonal elections in Lorient, obtaining 15.39% of the vote in North Lorient and later standing as candidate for the party in senatorial and National Assembly elections. She was elected as a member of the National Front at the European election in May 2014 but was asked to stand down after she called for European immigrants to be given the right to vote. She refused and instead resigned from the party two days after the election to sit as an independent MEP.

On 18 June 2014, it was announced that she was joining the Europe of Freedom and Direct Democracy (EFDD) group in the European Parliament, which is led by Nigel Farage of the UK Independence Party.

In spite of her previous 42-year membership of the National Front and her longstanding organizational activities within it, the EFDD stated in announcing her admission to the group that she had "joined the National Front with great hopes but realised that their philosophy was very different" and went on to add that she was an "Anglophile, with the desire for democratic self-determination and a respect among different nations".
