= List of members of the European Parliament (2014–2019) =

Results of the election: GUE/NGL S&D / G-EFA ALDE / EPP ECR / EFDD NI

Below is a list of members of the European Parliament serving in the eighth term (2014–2019). It is sorted by an English perception of surname treating all variations of de/di/do, van/von, Ó/Ní, and so forth as part of the collation key, even if this is not the normal practice in a member's own country.

During the 2014–2019 term, there are 751 members of parliament divided among the 28 member states.

== List of members ==
=== Austria ===
On the Austrian People's Party list: (EPP Group)

1. Othmar Karas
2. Elisabeth Köstinger – until 8 November 2017
  Lukas Mandl – since 30 November 2017
3. Paul Rübig
4. Claudia Schmidt
5. Heinz K. Becker

On the Social Democratic Party of Austria list: (S&D)

1. Eugen Freund
2. Evelyn Regner
3. Jörg Leichtfried – until 23 June 2015
  Karoline Graswander-Hainz – from 9 July 2015
4. Karin Kadenbach
5. Josef Weidenholzer

On the Freedom Party list: (Non-inscrits, since 15 June 2015 ENF)

1. Harald Vilimsky
2. Franz Obermayr
3. Georg Mayer
4. Barbara Kappel

On The Greens – The Green Alternative list: (Greens-EFA)

1. Ulrike Lunacek – until 8 November 2017
  Thomas Waitz – since 10 November 2017
2. Michel Reimon
3. Monika Vana

On the NEOS – The New Austria list: (ALDE)

1. Angelika Mlinar

=== Belgium ===
Dutch-speaking college

On the New Flemish Alliance list: (ECR Group)

1. Johan Van Overtveldt – until 10 October 2014
  Sander Loones – from 14 October 2014 until 11 November 2018
  Ralph Packet – from 22 November 2018
2. Helga Stevens
3. Mark Demesmaeker
4. Louis Ide – until 18 December 2014
  Anneleen Van Bossuyt – from 8 January 2015

On the Open Flemish Liberals and Democrats list: (ALDE)

1. Guy Verhofstadt
2. Annemie Neyts-Uyttebroeck – until 31 December 2014
  Hilde Vautmans – from 1 January 2015
3. Philippe De Backer – until 2 May 2016
  Lieve Wierinck – from 4 May 2016

On the Christian Democratic and Flemish list: (EPP Group)

1. Marianne Thyssen – until 31 October 2014
  Tom Vandenkendelaere – from 6 November 2014
2. Ivo Belet

On the Socialist Party – Different list: (S&D)

1. Kathleen Van Brempt

On the Green list: (Greens-EFA)

1. Bart Staes

On the Flemish Interest list: (Non-inscrits, since 15 June 2015 ENF)

1. Gerolf Annemans

French-speaking college

On the Socialist Party list: (S&D)

1. Marie Arena
2. Marc Tarabella
3. Hugues Bayet

On the Reformist Movement list: (ALDE)

1. Louis Michel
2. Frédérique Ries
3. Gérard Deprez

On the Ecolo list: (Greens-EFA)

1. Philippe Lamberts

On the Humanist Democratic Centre list: (EPP Group)

1. Claude Rolin

German-speaking college

On the Christian Social Party list: (EPP Group)

1. Pascal Arimont

=== Bulgaria ===
On the Citizens for European Development of Bulgaria list: (EPP Group)

1. Andrey Kovatchev
2. Vladimir Urutchev
3. Eva Maydell
4. Emil Radev
5. Tomislav Donchev – until 6 November 2014
  Andrey Novakov – since 24 November 2014
6. Mariya Gabriel – until 6 July 2017
  Asim Ademov – since 14 September 2017

On the Bulgarian Socialist Party list: (S&D)

1. Georgi Pirinski
2. Iliana Iotova – until 16 January 2017
  Petar Kurumbashev – since 17 January 2017
3. Sergei Stanishev
4. Momchil Nekov

On the Movement for Rights and Freedoms list: (ALDE)

1. Filiz Hyusmenova
2. Iskra Mihaylova
3. Nedzhmi Ali
4. Ilhan Kyuchyuk

On the Bulgaria Without Censorship-led coalition list: (ECR Group)

1. Nikolay Barekov (BWC, since 4 April 2017 Reload Bulgaria)
2. Angel Dzhambazki (IMRO)

On the Reformist Bloc list: (EPP Group)

1. Svetoslav Malinov

=== Croatia ===
On the Patrotic Coalition list:

- Croatian Democratic Union (EPP Group)
1. Ivana Maletić
2. Andrej Plenković – until 13 October 2016
  Željana Zovko – from 24 October 2016
3. Dubravka Šuica
4. Davor Ivo Stier – until 13 October 2016
  Ivica Tolić – from 24 October 2016
- Croatian Peasant Party (EPP Group)
1. Marijana Petir (left the party in 2017)
- Croatian Party of Rights dr. Ante Starčević (ECR Group)
1. Ruža Tomašić (left the party on 20 November 2014; since 27 January 2015 HKS)

On the Kukuriku Coalition list:

- Social Democratic Party of Croatia (S&D)
1. Tonino Picula
2. Biljana Borzan
- Croatian People's Party – Liberal Democrats (ALDE)
1. Jozo Radoš (left the party on 13 June 2017, joined later GLAS)
- Istrian Democratic Assembly (ALDE)
1. Ivan Jakovčić

On the Croatian Sustainable Development list: (Greens-EFA)

1. Davor Škrlec (Left the party on 20 April 2016)

=== Cyprus ===
On the Democratic Rally list: (EPP Group)

1. Eleni Theocharous (since 8 March 2016 KA and ECR Group)
2. Christos Stylianides – until 31 October 2014
  Lefteris Christoforou – from 3 November 2014

On the Progressive Party of Working People list: (GUE/NGL)

1. Neoklis Sylikiotis
2. Takis Hadjigeorgiou

On the Democratic Party list: (S&D)

1. Costas Mavrides

On the Movement for Social Democracy–Ecological and Environmental Movement list: (S&D)

1. Dimitris Papadakis (EDEK)

=== Czech Republic ===
On the ANO 2011 list: (ALDE)

1. Pavel Telička (left the party on 5 February 2018)
2. Petr Ježek (left the party on 5 February 2018)
3. Dita Charanzová
4. Martina Dlabajová

On the TOP 09–Mayors and Independents list: (EPP Group)

1. Jiří Pospíšil
2. Luděk Niedermayer
3. Jaromír Štětina
4. Stanislav Polčák (STAN)

On the Czech Social Democratic Party list: (S&D)

1. Jan Keller
2. Olga Sehnalová
3. Pavel Poc
4. Miroslav Poche

On the Communist Party of Bohemia and Moravia list: (GUE/NGL)

1. Kateřina Konečná
2. Miloslav Ransdorf – until 22 January 2016
  Jaromír Kohlíček – since 4 February 2016
3. Jiří Maštálka

On the Christian and Democratic Union - Czechoslovak People's Party list: (EPP Group)

1. Michaela Šojdrová
2. Pavel Svoboda
3. Tomáš Zdechovský

On the Civic Democratic Party list: (ECR Group)

1. Jan Zahradil
2. Evžen Tošenovský

On the Party of Free Citizens list: (EFDD)

1. Petr Mach – until 31 August 2017
  Jiří Payne – since 5 September 2017

=== Denmark ===
On the Danish People's Party list: (ECR Group)

1. Jørn Dohrmann
2. Rikke Karlsson (left the party on 16 October 2015, since 21 February 2018 Non-inscrits)
3. Morten Messerschmidt
4. Anders Primdahl Vistisen

On the Social Democrats list: (S&D)

1. Ole Christensen
2. Jeppe Kofod
3. Christel Schaldemose

On the Venstre list: (ALDE)

1. Jens Rohde (left the party on 20 December 2015 and joined the Social Liberals)
2. Ulla Tørnæs – until 29 February 2016
  Morten Løkkegaard – since 3 March 2016

On the Socialist People's Party list: (Greens-EFA)

1. Margrete Auken

On the Conservative People's Party list: (EPP Group)

1. Bendt Bendtsen

On the People's Movement against the EU list: (GUE/NGL)

1. Rina Ronja Kari

On the Danish Social Liberal Party list: (ALDE)

1. Morten Helveg Petersen

=== Estonia ===
On the Estonian Reform Party list: (ALDE)

1. Andrus Ansip – until 31 October 2014
  Urmas Paet – since 3 November 2014
2. Kaja Kallas – until 5 September 2018
  Igor Gräzin – since 6 September 2018

On the Estonian Centre Party list: (ALDE)

1. Yana Toom

On the Pro Patria and Res Publica Union list: (EPP Group)

1. Tunne Kelam

On the Social Democratic Party list: (S&D)

1. Marju Lauristin – until 6 November 2017
  Ivari Padar – since 6 November 2017

As an Independent: (Greens-EFA)

1. Indrek Tarand

=== Finland ===
On the National Coalition Party list: (EPP)

1. Sirpa Pietikäinen
2. Henna Virkkunen
3. Petri Sarvamaa

On the Centre Party list: (ALDE)

1. Olli Rehn – until 26 April 2015
  Hannu Takkula – from 27 April 2015 to 28 February 2018
  Elsi Katainen – since 1 March 2018
2. Paavo Väyrynen (left the party on 10 January 2017) – until 11 June 2018
  Mirja Vehkaperä – since 18 June 2018
3. Anneli Jäätteenmäki

On the Finns Party list: (ECR Group)

1. Jussi Halla-aho
2. Sampo Terho – until 26 April 2015
  Pirkko Ruohonen-Lerner – since 27 April 2015

On the Social Democratic Party list: (S&D)

1. Liisa Jaakonsaari
2. Miapetra Kumpula-Natri

On the Green League list: (Greens-EFA)

1. Heidi Hautala

On the Left Alliance list: (GUE–NGL)

1. Merja Kyllönen

On the Swedish People's Party of Finland list: (ALDE)

1. Nils Torvalds

=== France ===
On the National Front list (since 11 March 2018 National Rally): (Non-inscrits, since 15 June 2015 ENF)

1. Louis Aliot – until 20 July 2017
  France Jamet – since 21 July 2017
2. Marie-Christine Arnautu
3. Nicolas Bay
4. Dominique Bilde
5. Marie-Christine Boutonnet
6. Steeve Briois
7. Aymeric Chauprade (left the FN on 10 November 2015, since January 2016 Les Français Libres. 24 June–9 November 2015 ENF, since 17 April 2018 EFDD)
8. Mireille d'Ornano (since 4 October 2017 The Patriots and EFDD)
9. Édouard Ferrand – until 1 February 2018
  Jacques Colombier – since 2 February 2018
10. Sylvie Goddyn (since 20 October 2018 independent and EFDD, since 12 December 2018 Debout la France)
11. Bruno Gollnisch (remained Non-inscrits after the ENF group was formed)
12. Jean-François Jalkh
13. Gilles Lebreton (SIeL)
14. Marine Le Pen – until 18 June 2017
  Christelle Lechevalier – since 19 June 2017
15. Jean-Marie Le Pen (remained Non-inscrits after the ENF group was formed)
16. Philippe Loiseau
17. Dominique Martin
18. Joëlle Mélin
19. Bernard Monot (since 29 May 2018 Debout la France and EFDD)
20. Sophie Montel (from 4 October 2017 to 22 June 2018 The Patriots and EFDD, since 13 September 2018 Non-inscrit)
21. Florian Philippot (left FN on 21 September 2017, since 4 October 2017 The Patriots and EFDD)
22. Jean-Luc Schaffhauser
23. Mylène Troszczynski

On the Union for a Popular Movement list (since 30 May 2015 The Republicans): (EPP)

1. Michèle Alliot-Marie
2. Alain Cadec
3. Arnaud Danjean
4. Michel Dantin
5. Rachida Dati
6. Angélique Delahaye
7. Françoise Grossetête
8. Brice Hortefeux
9. Marc Joulaud
10. Philippe Juvin
11. Alain Lamassoure (left the party on 25 October 2017)
12. Jérôme Lavrilleux (out of the party since 16 October 2014)
13. Constance Le Grip – until 30 November 2017
  Geoffroy Didier – since 1 December 2017
14. Nadine Morano
15. Élisabeth Morin-Chartier (left the party on 21 February 2018)
16. Renaud Muselier
17. Maurice Ponga
18. Franck Proust
19. Tokia Saïfi (since 14 December 2017 Agir)
20. Anne Sander

On the Socialist Party-Radical Party of the Left list: (S&D)

1. Éric Andrieu
2. Guillaume Balas (since November 2017 Génération.s)
3. Pervenche Berès
4. Jean-Paul Denanot – until 10 June 2018
  Karine Gloanec Maurin – since 11 June 2018
5. Sylvie Guillaume
6. Louis-Joseph Manscour
7. Édouard Martin
8. Emmanuel Maurel (from 26 October to 5 November 2018 Non-inscrit, since 6 November 2018 GUE–NGL)
9. Gilles Pargneaux
10. Vincent Peillon
11. Christine Revault d'Allonnes-Bonnefoy
12. Virginie Rozière (PRG until December 2017, then Les Radicaux de gauche)
13. Isabelle Thomas (since November 2017 Génération.s)

On the Union of Democrats and Independents–Democratic Movement list: (ALDE)

1. Jean Arthuis (UDI-AC) (since 1 September 2017 En Marche!)
2. Jean-Marie Cavada (UDI-NC, January–June 2015 Nous Citoyens, since September 2015 Génération Citoyens)
3. Marielle de Sarnez (MoDem) – until 17 May 2017
  Patricia Lalonde (UDI) – since 18 May 2017
4. Nathalie Griesbeck (MoDem)
5. Sylvie Goulard (MoDem, since April 2017 En Marche!) – until 17 May 2017
  Thierry Cornillet (Radical) – since 18 May 2017
6. Dominique Riquet (UDI-Radical)
7. Robert Rochefort (MoDem)

On the Europe Ecology – The Greens list: (Greens-EFA)

1. José Bové
2. Karima Delli
3. Pascal Durand (left the party on 1 February 2016)
4. Yannick Jadot
5. Eva Joly
6. Michèle Rivasi

On the Left Front list: (GUE–NGL)

1. Patrick Le Hyaric (PCF)
2. Jean-Luc Mélenchon (PG) – until 18 June 2017
  Marie-Pierre Vieu – since 19 June 2017
3. Younous Omarjee (Union pour les Outremer)
4. Marie-Christine Vergiat

Elected as a candidate of the National Front, but left the party before inauguration: (EFDD)

1. Joëlle Bergeron

=== Germany ===
On the Christian Democratic Union list: (EPP)

1. Burkhard Balz – until 31 August 2018
  Stefan Gehrold – since 20 September 2018
2. Reimer Böge
3. Elmar Brok
4. Daniel Caspary
5. Birgit Collin-Langen
6. Jan Christian Ehler
7. Karl-Heinz Florenz
8. Michael Gahler
9. Jens Gieseke
10. Ingeborg Gräßle
11. Peter Jahr
12. Dieter-Lebrecht Koch
13. Werner Kuhn
14. Werner Langen
15. Peter Liese
16. Norbert Lins
17. Thomas Mann
18. David McAllister
19. Markus Pieper
20. Godelieve Quisthoudt-Rowohl
21. Herbert Reul – until 6 July 2017
  Dennis Radtke – since 24 July 2017
22. Sven Schulze
23. Andreas Schwab
24. Renate Sommer
25. Sabine Verheyen
26. Axel Voss
27. Rainer Wieland
28. Hermann Winkler
29. Joachim Zeller

On the Social Democratic Party of Germany list: (S&D)

1. Martin Schulz – until 10 February 2017
  Arndt Kohn – since 24 February 2017
2. Birgit Sippel
3. Udo Bullmann
4. Kerstin Westphal
5. Bernd Lange
6. Evelyne Gebhardt
7. Jens Geier
8. Jutta Steinruck – until 31 December 2017
  Michael Detjen – since 1 January 2018
9. Ismail Ertug
10. Sylvia-Yvonne Kaufmann
11. Matthias Groote – until 31 October 2016
  Tiemo Wölken – since 14 November 2016
12. Ulrike Rodust
13. Dietmar Köster
14. Petra Kammerevert
15. Jo Leinen
16. Martina Werner
17. Peter Simon
18. Maria Noichl
19. Knut Fleckenstein
20. Gabriele Preuß
21. Joachim Schuster
22. Susanne Melior
23. Constanze Krehl
24. Arne Lietz
25. Jakob von Weizsäcker – until 6 January 2019
  Babette Winter – since 10 January 2019
26. Iris Hoffmann
27. Norbert Neuser

On the Alliance '90 / The Greens list: (Greens-EFA)

1. Rebecca Harms
2. Sven Giegold
3. Ska Keller
4. Reinhard Bütikofer
5. Barbara Lochbihler
6. Jan Philipp Albrecht – until 2 July 2018
  Romeo Franz – since 3 July 2018
7. Helga Trüpel
8. Martin Häusling
9. Terry Reintke
10. Michael Cramer
11. Maria Heubuch

On the Left list: (GUE–NGL)

1. Gabi Zimmer
2. Thomas Händel
3. Cornelia Ernst
4. Helmut Scholz
5. Sabine Lösing
6. Fabio De Masi – until 23 October 2017
  Martin Schirdewan – since 8 November 2017
7. Martina Michels

On the Alternative for Germany list: (ECR Group)

1. Bernd Lucke (left the party in July 2015, joined LKR)
2. Hans-Olaf Henkel (left the party in July 2015, joined LKR, since 13 November 2018 independent)
3. Bernd Kölmel (left the party in July 2015, joined LKR, since 13 November 2018 independent)
4. Beatrix von Storch (left ECR group in April 2016, joined EFDD group) – until 23 October 2017
  Jörg Meuthen – since 8 November 2017 (EFDD)
5. Joachim Starbatty (left the party in July 2015, LKR, since 13 November 2018 independent)
6. Ulrike Trebesius (left the party in July 2015, LKR, since 13 November 2018 independent)
7. Marcus Pretzell (expelled from ECR group in April 2016, since May 2016 ENF and since 14 November 2017 The Blue Party).

On the Christian Social Union in Bavaria list: (EPP)

1. Markus Ferber
2. Angelika Niebler
3. Manfred Weber
4. Monika Hohlmeier
5. Albert Dess

On the Free Democratic Party list: (ALDE)

1. Alexander Graf Lambsdorff – until 23 October 2017
  Nadja Hirsch – since 8 November 2017
2. Michael Theurer – until 23 October 2017
  Wolf Klinz – since 8 November 2017
3. Gesine Meißner

On the Free Voters list: (ALDE)

1. Ulrike Müller

On the Pirate Party list: (Greens-EFA)

1. Felix Reda

On the Animal Protection Party list: (GUE–NGL)

1. Stefan Eck (left the party on 8 January 2015)

On the National Democratic Party of Germany list: (Non-inscrits)

1. Udo Voigt

On the Family Party of Germany list: (ECR Group)

1. Arne Gericke (from 1 June 2017 to 14 October 2018 Free Voters, since then Bündnis C)

On the Ecological Democratic Party list: (Greens-EFA)

1. Klaus Buchner

On The PARTY list: (Non-inscrits)

1. Martin Sonneborn

=== Greece ===
On the Coalition of the Radical Left list: (GUE–NGL)

1. Konstantinos Chrysogonos (left the party on 6 October 2018)
2. Manolis Glezos – until 8 July 2015
  Nikolaos Chountis – since 20 July 2015 (since 1 Sept 2015 Popular Unity)
3. Georgios Katrougalos – until 26 January 2015
  Stelios Kouloglou – since 27 January 2015
4. Konstantina Kouneva
5. Dimitrios Papadimoulis
6. Sofia Sakorafa (left Syriza on 28 September 2015)

On the New Democracy list: (EPP)

1. Manolis Kefalogiannis
2. Giorgos Kyrtsos
3. Maria Spyraki
4. Eliza Vozemberg
5. Theodoros Zagorakis

On the Golden Dawn list: (Non-inscrits)

1. Georgios Epitidios
2. Lambros Foundoulis
3. Eleftherios Synadinos (left the party on 25 April 2018)

On the Olive Tree list: (S&D)

1. Nikos Androulakis
2. Eva Kaili

On the River list: (S&D)

1. Giorgos Grammatikakis
2. Miltiadis Kyrkos

On the Communist Party of Greece list: (Non-inscrits)

1. Konstantinos Papadakis
2. Sotirios Zarianopoulos

On the Independent Greeks list: (ECR Group)

1. Notis Marias (left the party on 6 January 2015, since 5 April 2017 Greece - An Alternative Road)

=== Hungary ===
On the Fidesz–Christian Democratic People's Party list: (EPP Group)

1. Ildikó Gáll-Pelcz – until 31 August 2017
  Lívia Járóka – since 15 September 2017
2. József Szájer
3. László Tőkés
4. Tamás Deutsch
5. András Gyürk
6. Kinga Gál
7. György Schöpflin
8. Norbert Erdős
9. Andrea Bocskor
10. Andor Deli
11. Ádám Kósa
12. György Hölvényi (KDNP)

On the Jobbik list: (Non-inscrits)

1. Krisztina Morvai (independent, severed ties with Jobbik on 13 April 2018)
2. Zoltán Balczó
3. Béla Kovács (left the party on 6 December 2017)

On the Hungarian Socialist Party list: (S&D)

1. Tibor Szanyi
2. István Ujhelyi

On the Democratic Coalition list: (S&D)

1. Csaba Molnár
2. Péter Niedermüller

On the Together 2014–Dialogue for Hungary list: (Greens-EFA)

1. Benedek Jávor

On the Politics Can Be Different list: (Greens-EFA)

1. Tamás Meszerics (independent, left the party on 22 October 2018)

=== Ireland ===
As candidates of Fine Gael: (EPP Group)

1. Deirdre Clune
2. Brian Hayes
3. Seán Kelly
4. Mairead McGuinness

As candidates of Sinn Féin: (GUE–NGL)

1. Lynn Boylan
2. Matt Carthy
3. Liadh Ní Riada

As a candidate of Fianna Fáil, but expelled a month after the election: (ECR Group)

1. Brian Crowley

As Independent candidates:

1. Nessa Childers (S&D)
2. Luke 'Ming' Flanagan (GUE–NGL)
3. Marian Harkin (ALDE)

=== Italy ===
On the Democratic Party list: (S&D)

1. Brando Benifei
2. Goffredo Bettini
3. Simona Bonafé
4. Mercedes Bresso
5. Renata Briano
6. Nicola Caputo
7. Caterina Chinnici
8. Sergio Cofferati (until 19 January 2015, since November 2015 SI)
9. Silvia Costa
10. Andrea Cozzolino
11. Nicola Danti
12. Paolo De Castro
13. Isabella De Monte
14. Enrico Gasbarra
15. Elena Gentile
16. Michela Giuffrida
17. Roberto Gualtieri
18. Cécile Kyenge
19. Alessandra Moretti – until 1 February 2015
  Damiano Zoffoli – since 18 February 2015
20. Luigi Morgano
21. Alessia Mosca
22. Pier Antonio Panzeri (since 25 February 2017 Art.1)
23. Massimo Paolucci (since 25 February 2017 Art.1)
24. Pina Picierno
25. Gianni Pittella – until 22 March 2018
  Giuseppe Ferrandino – since 17 April 2018
26. David Sassoli
27. Elly Schlein (left the party on 9 July 2015, since then Possible)
28. Renato Soru (from 10 May 2016 to 15 May 2017 Non-inscrits)
29. Patrizia Toia
30. Daniele Viotti
31. Flavio Zanonato (since 25 February 2017 Art.1)

On the Five Star Movement list: (EFDD)

1. Isabella Adinolfi
2. Marco Affronte (since 11 January 2017 Greens-EFA)
3. Laura Agea
4. Daniela Aiuto
5. Tiziana Beghin
6. David Borrelli (since 13 February 2018 Non-inscrits)
7. Fabio Massimo Castaldo
8. Ignazio Corrao
9. Rosa D'Amato
10. Eleonora Evi
11. Laura Ferrara
12. Giulia Moi
13. Piernicola Pedicini
14. Dario Tamburrano
15. Marco Valli
16. Marco Zanni (since 11 January 2017 ENF and 15 May 2018 Lega Nord)
17. Marco Zullo

On the Forza Italia list: (EPP Group)

1. Salvatore Cicu
2. Alberto Cirio
3. Lara Comi
4. Raffaele Fitto (since 28 January 2017 DI and ECR Group)
5. Elisabetta Gardini
6. Fulvio Martusciello
7. Barbara Matera
8. Alessandra Mussolini (from 30 November to 11 December 2016 Non-inscrits, left the party on 3 September 2018 but remained in the group)
9. Aldo Patriciello
10. Salvo Pogliese – until 14 July 2018
  Giovanni Miccichè – from 19 July 2018 to 19 August 2018
  Innocenzo Leontini – since 20 August 2018
11. Remo Sernagiotto (since 28 January 2017 DI and ECR Group)
12. Antonio Tajani
13. Giovanni Toti – until 9 July 2015
  Stefano Maullu – since 13 July 2015

On the Lega Nord list: (Non-inscrits, since 15 June 2015 ENF)

1. Mara Bizzotto
2. Mario Borghezio
3. Gianluca Buonanno – until 5 June 2016
  Angelo Ciocca – since 7 July 2016
4. Flavio Tosi – until 8 July 2014
  Lorenzo Fontana – from 11 July 2014 to 22 March 2018
  Giancarlo Scottà – from 17 April 2018
5. Matteo Salvini – until 22 March 2018
  Danilo Oscar Lancini – since 17 April 2018

On the New Centre-Right–Union of Christian and Centre Democrats list: (EPP Group)

1. Lorenzo Cesa
2. Giovanni La Via (from 18 March 2017 to 13 November 2018 AP, since then FI)
3. Massimiliano Salini (since 1 October 2015 FI)

On The Other Europe list: (GUE–NGL)

1. Eleonora Forenza
2. Curzio Maltese
3. Barbara Spinelli (left the party on 18 May 2015)

On the South Tyrolean People's Party list: (EPP Group)

1. Herbert Dorfmann

=== Latvia ===
On the Unity list: (EPP Group)

1. Valdis Dombrovskis – until 31 October 2014
  Inese Vaidere – from 1 November 2014
2. Sandra Kalniete
3. Artis Pabriks (joined Movement For! on 3 June 2018) – until 5 November 2018
  Kārlis Šadurskis – since 28 November 2018
4. Arturs Krišjānis Kariņš – until 23 January 2019
  Aleksejs Loskutovs – since 24 January 2019

On the National Alliance list: (ECR Group)

1. Roberts Zīle

On the Harmony list: (S&D)

1. Andrejs Mamikins (left the party in June 2018, joined Latvian Russian Union)

On the Union of Greens and Farmers list: (EFDD, 16 Oct 2014–27 Apr 2015 Non-inscrits, since 27 April 2015 ALDE)

1. Iveta Grigule (LZS)

On the For Human Rights in United Latvia list: (Greens-EFA)

1. Tatjana Ždanoka – until 4 March 2018
  Miroslavs Mitrofanovs – since 5 March 2018

=== Lithuania ===
On the Homeland Union list: (EPP Group)

1. Algirdas Saudargas
2. Gabrielius Landsbergis – until 12 May 2016
  Laima Andrikienė – since 30 May 2016

On the Social Democratic Party of Lithuania list: (S&D)

1. Zigmantas Balčytis
2. Vilija Blinkevičiūtė

On the Liberal Movement list: (ALDE)

1. Antanas Guoga (left the party and since 5 October 2016 EPP Group)
2. Petras Auštrevičius

On the Order and Justice list: (EFDD)

1. Rolandas Paksas
2. Valentinas Mazuronis (since 19 May 2015 Labour Party and ALDE, left the Labour Party on 7 November 2017)

On the Labour Party list: (ALDE)

1. Viktor Uspaskich

On the Electoral Action of Poles in Lithuania list: (ECR Group)

1. Valdemar Tomasevski

On the Lithuanian Peasant and Greens Union list: (Greens-EFA)

1. Bronis Ropė

=== Luxembourg ===
On the Christian Social People’s Party list: (EPP Group)

1. Viviane Reding – until 1 September 2018
  Christophe Hansen – since 2 September 2018
2. Georges Bach
3. Frank Engel

On the Greens list: (Greens-EFA)

1. Claude Turmes – until 19 June 2018
  Tilly Metz – since 20 June 2018

On the Democratic Party list: (ALDE)

1. Charles Goerens

On the Luxembourg Socialist Workers' Party list: (S&D)

1. Mady Delvaux-Stehres

=== Malta ===
As candidates of the Nationalist Party: (EPP Group)

1. Roberta Metsola
2. David Casa
3. Therese Comodini Cachia – until 23 June 2017
  Francis Zammit Dimech – since 24 June 2017

As candidates of the Labour Party: (S&D)

1. Alfred Sant
2. Miriam Dalli
3. Marlene Mizzi

=== Netherlands ===
On the Christian Democratic Appeal list: (EPP Group)

1. Annie Schreijer-Pierik
2. Lambert van Nistelrooij
3. Esther de Lange
4. Jeroen Lenaers
5. Wim van de Camp

On the Democrats 66 list: (ALDE)

1. Sophie in 't Veld
2. Gerben-Jan Gerbrandy
3. Marietje Schaake
4. Matthijs van Miltenburg

On the Party for Freedom list: (Non-inscrits, since 15 June 2015 ENF)

1. Olaf Stuger
2. Marcel de Graaff
3. Vicky Maeijer – until 15 March 2017
  André Elissen – since 13 June 2017
4. Hans Jansen – until 5 May 2015
  Auke Zijlstra – since 1 September 2015 (as Non-Inscrits from 1 to 7 September 2015)

On the People's Party for Freedom and Democracy list: (ALDE)

1. Jan Huitema
2. Hans van Baalen
3. Cora van Nieuwenhuizen – until 25 October 2017
  Caroline Nagtegaal – since 14 November 2017

On the Labour Party list: (S&D)

1. Paul Tang
2. Agnes Jongerius
3. Kati Piri

On the Socialist Party list: (GUE/NGL Group)

1. Anne-Marie Mineur
2. Dennis de Jong

On the Christian Union–Reformed Political Party list: (ECR Group)

1. Peter van Dalen (CU)
2. Bas Belder (SGP)

On the GreenLeft list: (Greens-EFA)

1. Bas Eickhout
2. Judith Sargentini

On the Party for the Animals list: (GUE/NGL Group)

1. Anja Hazekamp

=== Poland ===
On the Civic Platform list: (EPP Group)

1. Michał Boni
2. Jerzy Buzek
3. Danuta Hübner
4. Danuta Jazłowiecka
5. Agnieszka Kozłowska-Rajewicz
6. Barbara Kudrycka
7. Janusz Lewandowski
8. Elżbieta Łukacijewska
9. Jan Olbrycht
10. Julia Pitera
11. Marek Plura
12. Dariusz Rosati
13. Jacek Saryusz-Wolski (since 23 March 2017 non-inscrits)
14. Adam Szejnfeld
15. Róża Thun
16. Jarosław Wałęsa
17. Bogdan Wenta – until 5 November 2018
  Bogusław Sonik – since 20 November 2018
18. Bogdan Zdrojewski
19. Tadeusz Zwiefka

On the Law and Justice list: (ECR Group)

1. Ryszard Czarnecki
2. Andrzej Duda – until 25 May 2015
  Edward Czesak – since 11 June 2015
3. Anna Fotyga
4. Beata Gosiewska
5. Marek Gróbarczyk – until 15 November 2015
  Czesław Hoc – since 27 November 2015
6. Dawid Jackiewicz – until 15 November 2015
  Sławomir Kłosowski – since 27 November 2015
7. Marek Jurek (Right Wing of the Republic)
8. Karol Karski
9. Zdzisław Krasnodębski (independent)
10. Zbigniew Kuźmiuk
11. Ryszard Legutko
12. Stanisław Ożóg
13. Bolesław Piecha
14. Mirosław Piotrowski (left the party on 9 October 2014)
15. Tomasz Poręba
16. Kazimierz Michał Ujazdowski (left the party on 3 January 2017, since 13 April 2018 Non-inscrit)
17. Jadwiga Wiśniewska
18. Janusz Wojciechowski – until 7 May 2016
  Urszula Krupa (independent) – since 24 June 2016
19. Kosma Złotowski

On the Democratic Left Alliance-Labor Union list: (S&D)

1. Adam Gierek (UP)
2. Bogusław Liberadzki (SLD)
3. Krystyna Łybacka (SLD)
4. Janusz Zemke (SLD)

On the Congress of the New Right list: (Non-inscrits, since 15 June 2015 ENF)

1. Robert Iwaszkiewicz (since 20 October 2014 EFDD, since January 2015 member of the party KORWiN)
2. Janusz Korwin-Mikke (left the party and founded KORWiN on 22 January 2015) – until 1 March 2018
  Dobromir Sośnierz – since 22 March 2018
3. Michał Marusik
4. Stanisław Żółtek

On the Polish People's Party list: (EPP Group)

1. Andrzej Grzyb
2. Krzysztof Hetman
3. Jarosław Kalinowski
4. Czesław Siekierski

Elected on the Democratic Left Alliance list, but left the party before inauguration: (S&D)

1. Lidia Geringer de Oedenberg

=== Portugal ===
On the Socialist Party list: (S&D)

1. Francisco Assis
2. Maria João Rodrigues
3. Carlos Zorrinho
4. Elisa Ferreira – until 19 June 2016
  Manuel António dos Santos – since 28 June 2016
5. Ricardo Serrão Santos
6. Ana Maria Gomes
7. Pedro Silva Pereira
8. Liliana Rodrigues

On the Portugal Alliance coalition list: (EPP Group)

1. Paulo Rangel (PSD)
2. Fernando Ruas (PSD)
3. Sofia Ribeiro (PSD)
4. Nuno Melo (CDS-PP)
5. Carlos Coelho (PSD)
6. Cláudia Aguiar (PSD)
7. José Manuel Fernandes (PSD)

On the Democratic Unitarian Coalition list: (GUE/NGL)

1. João Ferreira
2. Inês Zuber – until 30 January 2016
  João Pimenta Lopes – since 31 January 2016
3. Miguel Viegas

On the Earth Party list: (ALDE)

1. António Marinho e Pinto (left the MPT in September 2014, formed the PDR in February 2015)
2. José Inácio Faria (since 12 December 2016 EPP Group)

On the Left Bloc list: (GUE/NGL)

1. Marisa Matias

=== Romania ===
On the Social Democratic Party-led coalition list: (S&D)

1. Corina Crețu – until 31 October 2014
  Emilian Pavel – from 1 November 2014
2. Cătălin Ivan (since 27 September 2018 independent and Non-inscrits)
3. Dan Nica
4. Maria Grapini (until 7 July 2015 PC, after that PPUSL)
5. Damian Drăghici (UNPR, left the party on 28 November 2016)
6. Daciana Sârbu (left the party on 9 July 2018 but remained in the group)
7. Ioan Mircea Pașcu
8. Viorica Dăncilă – until 28 January 2018
  Gabriela Zoană – since 30 January 2018
9. Sorin Moisă (until 21 November 2017, then Non-inscrits, and EPP Group since 29 November 2017)
10. Victor Boștinaru
11. Claudiu Ciprian Tănăsescu
12. Doru-Claudian Frunzulică (UNPR, since 30 June 2016 PSD)
13. Laurențiu Rebega (until 14 July 2015 PC, then independent, from 25 August 2015 to 2 March 2018 ENF, since 3 April 2018 ECR)
14. Ana-Claudia Țapardel
15. Andi Cristea
16. Victor Negrescu – until 29 June 2017
  Răzvan Popa – since 13 September 2017

On the National Liberal Party list: (EPP Group)

1. Norica Nicolai (ALDE, left the PNL on 12 October 2015, since 1 February 2017 ALDE Romania)
2. Adina-Ioana Vălean
3. Ramona Mănescu
4. Cristian Bușoi
5. Renate Weber (since 17 November 2014 ALDE, left the PNL on 10 September 2015)
6. Eduard Hellvig – until 1 March 2015
  Mihai Țurcanu – since 2 March 2015

On the Democratic Liberal Party list (merged into the National Liberal Party on 17 November 2014): (EPP Group)

1. Theodor Stolojan
2. Monica Macovei (left the PLD in September 2014, founded M10 in June 2015, since 27 October 2015 ECR Group)
3. Traian Ungureanu
4. Marian-Jean Marinescu
5. Daniel Buda

On the Democratic Union of Hungarians in Romania list: (EPP Group)

1. Iuliu Winkler
2. Csaba Sógor

On the People's Movement Party list: (EPP Group)

1. Cristian Preda (left the PMP in December 2014)
2. Siegfried Mureșan (left the party and joined PNL on 7 May 2018)

As an Independent: (ALDE)

1. Mircea Diaconu

=== Slovakia ===
On the Direction – Social Democracy list: (S&D)

1. Monika Flašíková-Beňová
2. Boris Zala
3. Vladimír Maňka
4. Monika Smolková

On the Christian Democratic Movement list: (EPP Group)

1. Anna Záborská
2. Miroslav Mikolášik

On the Slovak Democratic and Christian Union list: (EPP Group)

1. Eduard Kukan (left the party on 29 September 2016)
2. Ivan Štefanec (left the party on 25 February 2015 and joined KDH on 7 July 2015)

On the Ordinary People and Independent Personalities list: (ECR Group)

1. Branislav Škripek

On the New Majority list: (ECR Group)

1. Jana Žitňanská

On the Freedom and Solidarity list: (ALDE; since 8 October 2014 ECR Group)

1. Richard Sulík

On the Party of the Hungarian Community list: (EPP Group)

1. Pál Csáky

On the Most–Híd list: (EPP Group)

1. József Nagy

=== Slovenia ===
On the Slovenian Democratic Party list: (EPP Group)

1. Milan Zver
2. Romana Tomc
3. Patricija Šulin

On the New Slovenia-Slovenian People’s Party list: (EPP Group)

1. Lojze Peterle
2. Franc Bogovič

On the Verjamem list: (Greens-EFA)

1. Igor Šoltes

On the Social Democrats list: (S&D)

1. Tanja Fajon

On the Democratic Party of Pensioners of Slovenia list: (ALDE)

1. Ivo Vajgl

=== Spain ===
On the People's Party list: (EPP Group)

1. Miguel Arias Cañete – until 31 October 2014
  Carlos Iturgaiz – from 3 November 2014
2. Esteban González Pons
3. Teresa Jiménez-Becerril
4. Luis de Grandes Pascual
5. Pilar del Castillo
6. Ramón Luis Valcárcel
7. Rosa Estaràs
8. Francisco José Millán Mon
9. Pablo Zalba Bidegain – until 17 November 2016
  José Ignacio Salafranca Sánchez-Neyra – since 3 January 2017
10. Verónica Lope Fontagne
11. Antonio López-Istúriz White
12. Santiago Fisas
13. Gabriel Mato Adrover
14. Pilar Ayuso González
15. Esther Herranz García
16. Agustín Díaz de Mera García Consuegra

On the Spanish Socialist Workers' Party list: (S&D)

1. Elena Valenciano
2. Ramón Jáuregui
3. Soledad Cabezón Ruiz
4. Juan Fernando López Aguilar (15 April – 21 July 2015 Non-inscrits)
5. Iratxe García
6. Javier López Fernández
7. Inmaculada Rodríguez-Piñero
8. Enrique Guerrero Salom
9. Eider Gardiazabal Rubial
10. José Blanco López
11. Clara Aguilera García
12. Sergio Gutiérrez Prieto
13. Inés Ayala
14. Jonás Fernández Álvarez

On the United Left–Initiative for Catalonia Greens list: (GUE/NGL)

1. Willy Meyer Pleite – until 9 July 2014
  Javier Couso Permuy – since 15 July 2014
2. Paloma López Bermejo
3. Ernest Urtasun (ICV) (Greens-EFA)
4. Marina Albiol
5. Lidia Senra (Anova)
6. Ángela Rosa Vallina

On the Podemos list: (GUE/NGL)

1. Pablo Iglesias Turrión - until 27 October 2015
  Xabier Benito Ziluaga – since 25 November 2015
2. Teresa Rodríguez – until 4 March 2015
  Miguel Urbán Crespo – since 5 March 2015
3. Carlos Jiménez Villarejo – until 31 July 2014
  Tania González Peñas – since 11 September 2014
4. Lola Sánchez Caldentey
5. Pablo Echenique Robba – until 14 March 2015
  Estefanía Torres Martínez – since 25 March 2015

On the Union, Progress and Democracy list: (ALDE)

1. Francisco Sosa Wagner – until 19 October 2014
  Enrique Calvet Chambon – from 20 November 2014 (left the party on 23 June 2015)
2. Maite Pagazaurtundúa
3. Fernando Maura Barandiarán – until 24 November 2015
  Teresa Giménez Barbat – since 25 November 2015 (left UPyD on 7 April 2016)
4. Beatriz Becerra (left UPyD on 1 April 2016)

On the Coalition for Europe list: (ALDE)

1. Ramon Tremosa (CDC)
2. Izaskun Bilbao Barandica (PNV)
3. Francesc de Paula Gambús (UDC, left the party on 11 May 2016) (EPP Group)

On The Left for the Right to Decide list: (Greens-EFA)

1. Josep Maria Terricabras (ERC)
2. Ernest Maragall (NECat) – until 30 December 2016
  Jordi Solé i Ferrando (ERC) – since 3 January 2017

On the Citizens – Party of the Citizenry list: (ALDE)

1. Javier Nart
2. Juan Carlos Girauta – until 11 January 2016.
  Carolina Punset – from 3 February 2016 (left the party on 20 October 2018 but remained in the group)

On The Peoples Decide list: (GUE/NGL)

1. Josu Juaristi (EH Bildu) – until 27 February 2018
  Ana Miranda Paz (BNG, Greens-EFA) – since 28 February 2018

On the European Spring list: (Greens-EFA)

1. Jordi Sebastià (Compromis) – until 9 October 2016.
  Florent Marcellesi (Equo) – from 11 October 2016

=== Sweden ===
On the Social Democratic list: (S&D)

1. Marita Ulvskog
2. Olle Ludvigsson
3. Jytte Guteland
4. Jens Nilsson – until 13 March 2018
  Aleksander Gabelić – since 4 April 2018
5. Anna Hedh

On the Green Party list: (Greens-EFA)

1. Isabella Lövin – until 2 October 2014
  Linnéa Engström – from 8 October 2014
2. Peter Eriksson – until 24 May 2016
  Jakop Dalunde – since 7 June 2016
3. Bodil Valero
4. Max Andersson

On the Moderate Party list: (EPP Group)

1. Anna Maria Corazza Bildt
2. Gunnar Hökmark
3. Christofer Fjellner

On the Liberal People's Party list: (ALDE)

1. Marit Paulsen – until 29 September 2015
  Jasenko Selimovic – from 30 September 2015
2. Cecilia Wikström

On the Sweden Democrats list: (EFDD)

1. Kristina Winberg
2. Peter Lundgren

On the Centre Party list: (ALDE)

1. Fredrick Federley

On the Left Party list: (GUE/NGL Group)

1. Malin Björk

On the Christian Democrats list: (EPP Group)

1. Lars Adaktusson – until 23 September 2018
  Anders Sellström – since 3 October 2018

On the Feminist Initiative list: (S&D)

1. Soraya Post

=== United Kingdom ===
On the UKIP list: (EFDD)

1. Stuart Agnew (since 16 January 2019 ENF)
2. Tim Aker (left the party on 5 December 2018, since 12 February 2019 The Brexit Party)
3. Jonathan Arnott (left the party on 19 January 2018, since April 2019 The Brexit Party)
4. Janice Atkinson (expelled from UKIP, joined ENF on 15 June 2015)
5. Amjad Bashir (joined the Conservatives and the ECR Group on 23 January 2015)
6. Gerard Batten (Non-Inscrits 8 December 2018 – 16 January 2019, since then ENF)
7. Louise Bours (left the party on 22 November 2018)
8. James Carver (left the party on 28 May 2018, Non-Inscrits)
9. David Coburn (left the party on 7 December 2018, since 12 February 2019 The Brexit Party)
10. Jane Collins (since 16 January 2019 ENF, joined The Brexit Party in April 2019)
11. William Dartmouth (left the party on 19 October 2018)
12. Bill Etheridge (left the party on 1 October 2018, 8 October 2018-12 February 2019Libertarian Party, since then The Brexit Party)
13. Nigel Farage (left the party on 4 December 2018, since 12 February 2019 The Brexit Party)
14. Ray Finch (since April 2019 The Brexit Party)
15. Nathan Gill (left the party on 6 December 2018, since 12 February 2019 The Brexit Party)
16. Roger Helmer – until 31 July 2017
  Jonathan Bullock – since 1 August 2017 (left the party on 9 December 2018, since 12 February 2019 The Brexit Party)
17. Mike Hookem
18. Diane James (Non-Inscrits since 20 November 2016, joined The Brexit Party in April 2019)
19. Paul Nuttall (left the party on 7 December 2018, since 12 February 2019 The Brexit Party)
20. Patrick O'Flynn (left the party on 27 December 2018, since then Social Democratic Party)
21. Margot Parker (since April 2019 The Brexit Party)
22. Julia Reid (left the party on 8 December 2018, since 12 February 2019 The Brexit Party)
23. Jill Seymour (since April 2019 The Brexit Party)
24. Steven Woolfe (Non-Inscrits since 24 October 2016)

On the Labour Party list: (S&D)

1. Lucy Anderson
2. Paul Brannen
3. Richard Corbett
4. Seb Dance
5. Anneliese Dodds – until 8 June 2017
  John Howarth – since 30 June 2017
6. Neena Gill
7. Theresa Griffin
8. Mary Honeyball
9. Richard Howitt – until 1 November 2016
  Alex Mayer – since 15 November 2016
10. Afzal Khan – until 8 June 2017
  Wajid Khan – since 29 June 2017
11. Judith Kirton-Darling
12. David Martin
13. Linda McAvan
14. Clare Moody
15. Claude Moraes
16. Siôn Simon
17. Catherine Stihler – until 31 January 2019
18. Derek Vaughan
19. Julie Ward
20. Glenis Willmott – until 2 October 2017
  Rory Palmer – since 3 October 2017

On the Conservative Party list: (ECR Group)

1. Richard Ashworth (since 28 February 2018 EPP Group)
2. Philip Bradbourn – until 19 December 2014
  Daniel Dalton – from 8 January 2015
3. David Campbell Bannerman
4. Nirj Deva
5. Ian Duncan – until 22 June 2017
  Nosheena Mobarik – since 8 September 2017
6. Vicky Ford – until 8 June 2017
  John Flack – since 28 June 2017
7. Jacqueline Foster
8. Ashley Fox
9. Julie Girling (since 28 February 2018 EPP Group)
10. Daniel Hannan
11. Syed Kamall
12. Sajjad Karim
13. Timothy Kirkhope - until 5 October 2016
  John Procter – since 17 November 2016
14. Andrew Lewer – until 8 June 2017
  Rupert Matthews – since 29 June 2017
15. Emma McClarkin
16. Anthea McIntyre
17. Kay Swinburne
18. Charles Tannock
19. Geoffrey Van Orden

On the Green Party of England and Wales list: (Greens-EFA)

1. Jean Lambert
2. Molly Scott Cato
3. Keith Taylor

On the Scottish National Party list: (Greens-EFA)

1. Ian Hudghton
2. Alyn Smith

On the Liberal Democrats list: (ALDE)

1. Catherine Bearder

On the Plaid Cymru list: (Greens-EFA)

1. Jill Evans

Northern Ireland

As a candidate of Sinn Féin: (GUE/NGL Group)

1. Martina Anderson

As a candidate of the Democratic Unionist Party: (Non-inscrits)

1. Diane Dodds

As a candidate of the Ulster Unionist Party: (ECR Group)

1. Jim Nicholson

== Members of the European Parliament who are also citizen of a non-EU country ==
Andrea Bocskor who was elected in Hungary for Fidesz holds besides her Hungarian citizenship also Ukrainian citizenship (this practice is quite common among the Hungarian minority in Ukraine, although, at the time of her election, Ukrainian law did not recognize dual citizenship). Hence, she became the first elected Ukrainian in the European Parliament. Bocskor lives in Ukraine; in the city Berehove.

== See also ==
- 2014 European Parliament election
- Members of the European Parliament 2014–2019
