= Claudia Schmidt =

Claudia Schmidt may refer to:

- Claudia Schmidt (musician) (born 1953), American musician
- Claudia Schmidt (politician) (born 1963), Austrian politician and educator
