= Liliana Rodríguez =

Liliana Rodríguez may refer to:

- Liliana Rodríguez (footballer) (born 1996), Mexican footballer
- Liliana Rodríguez (actress) (born 1967), Venezuelan singer and TV actress
- Liliana Rodríguez, 1985 Federation Cup
- Liliana Rodríguez, 1993 South American Cross Country Championships

== See also ==
- Liliana Rodrigues, Portuguese politician
