= Van Miltenburg =

van Miltenburg is a surname. Notable people with the surname include:

- Anouchka van Miltenburg (born 1967), Dutch politician and journalist
- James Cornelius van Miltenburg (1909–1966), Pakistani Roman Catholic archbishop
- Matthijs van Miltenburg (born 1972), Dutch politician
- Peter Van Miltenburg (born 1957), Australian sprinter
