= Claudia Țapardel =

Romanian politician (born 1983)

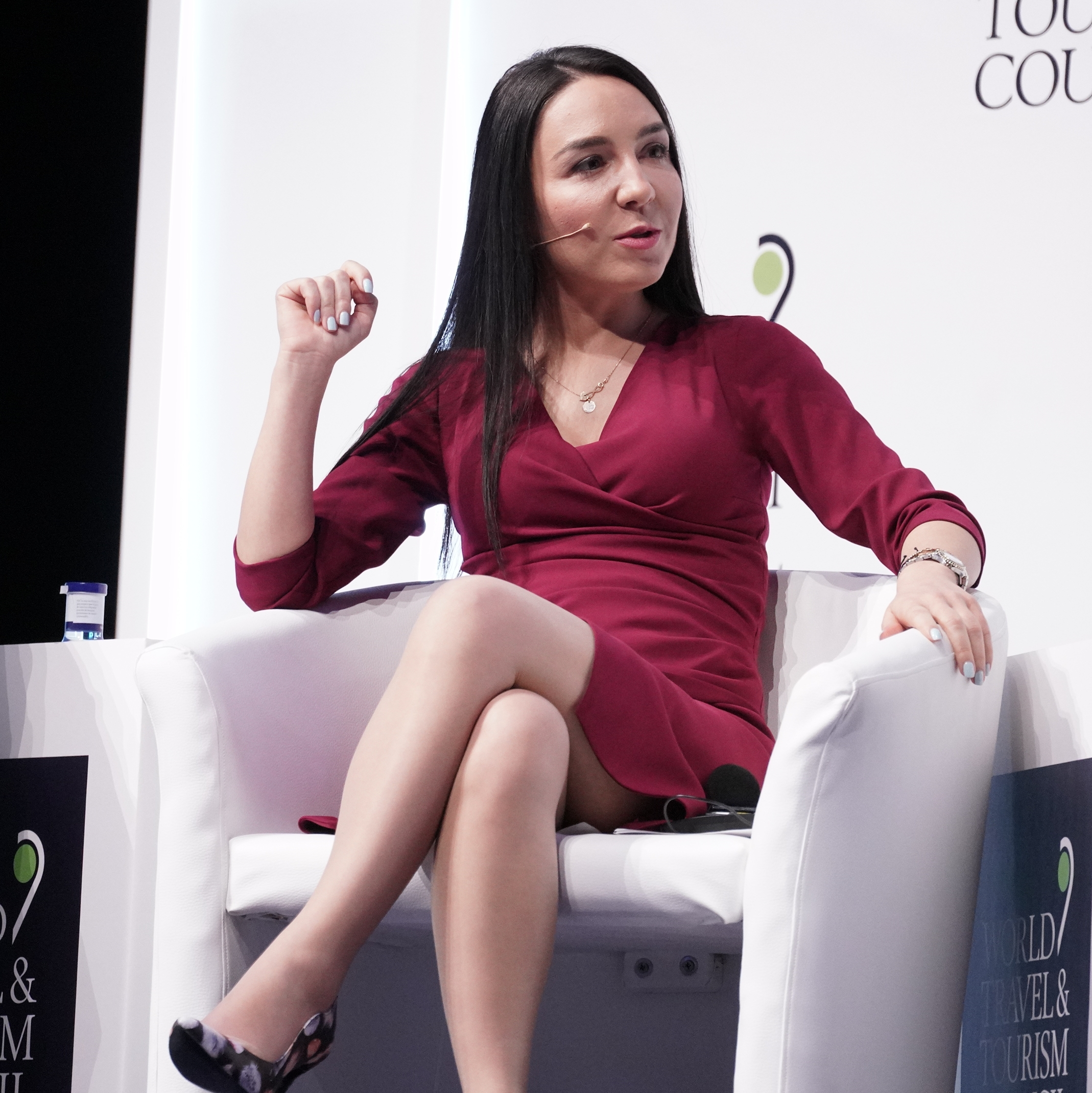
Claudia Țapardel in 2019

Ana-Claudia Țapardel (born 16 December 1983, in Bucharest, Romania) is a Romanian Member of the European Parliament for the Progressive Alliance of Socialists and Democrats (S&D). Elected in May 2014, she is currently one of the youngest MEPs in the European Parliament.

In the European Parliament, Ţapardel is a member of the Committee on Transport and Tourism, the Committee on Constitutional Affairs and the Delegation for relations with the countries of South Asia. She is a substitute member in the Committee on Budgets, the Parliamentary Delegation for relations with Mexico, and the Parliamentary Delegation for relations with Latin American countries. She is also co-chairperson of the European Parliament Intergroup on Tourism Development and Cultural Patrimony.

== Education and training ==
Ţapardel is an economist, licensed in both Administrative Sciences (Academy of Economic Studies - Faculty of Public Administration and Management) and Banking Management (Romanian Banking Institute - School of Management, specializing in Finance - Banks).

In April 2003 and April 2006 she obtained special awards at the Student Scientific and Communication Sessions.

She earned a PhD in Economics from the Academy of Economic Studies, specializing in management and strategic planning in local communities in Romania.

She also holds a master's degree in International Business (from the Academy of Economic Studies, Faculty of International Economic Relations), a master's degree in International Conflict Analysis and Resolution (from the National School of Political Science and Public Administration, Department of International Relations and European Integration), and a master's degree in Public Management (from the "Ovidiu Şincai" Social Democratic Institute).

== Political and professional experience ==
Ţapardel has been a member of the Social Democratic Party (PSD) since January 2002. She is currently serving as spokesperson for the Youth Organisation of the PSD (Social Democratic Youth).

She is vice-president of the Bucharest Organization of PSD and Vice President of the Young Social Democrats, with more attributions within the 3rd and 5th District Bucharest Organizations of PSD.
