= Joachim Schuster =

German politician (born 1962)

Joachim Schuster MEP
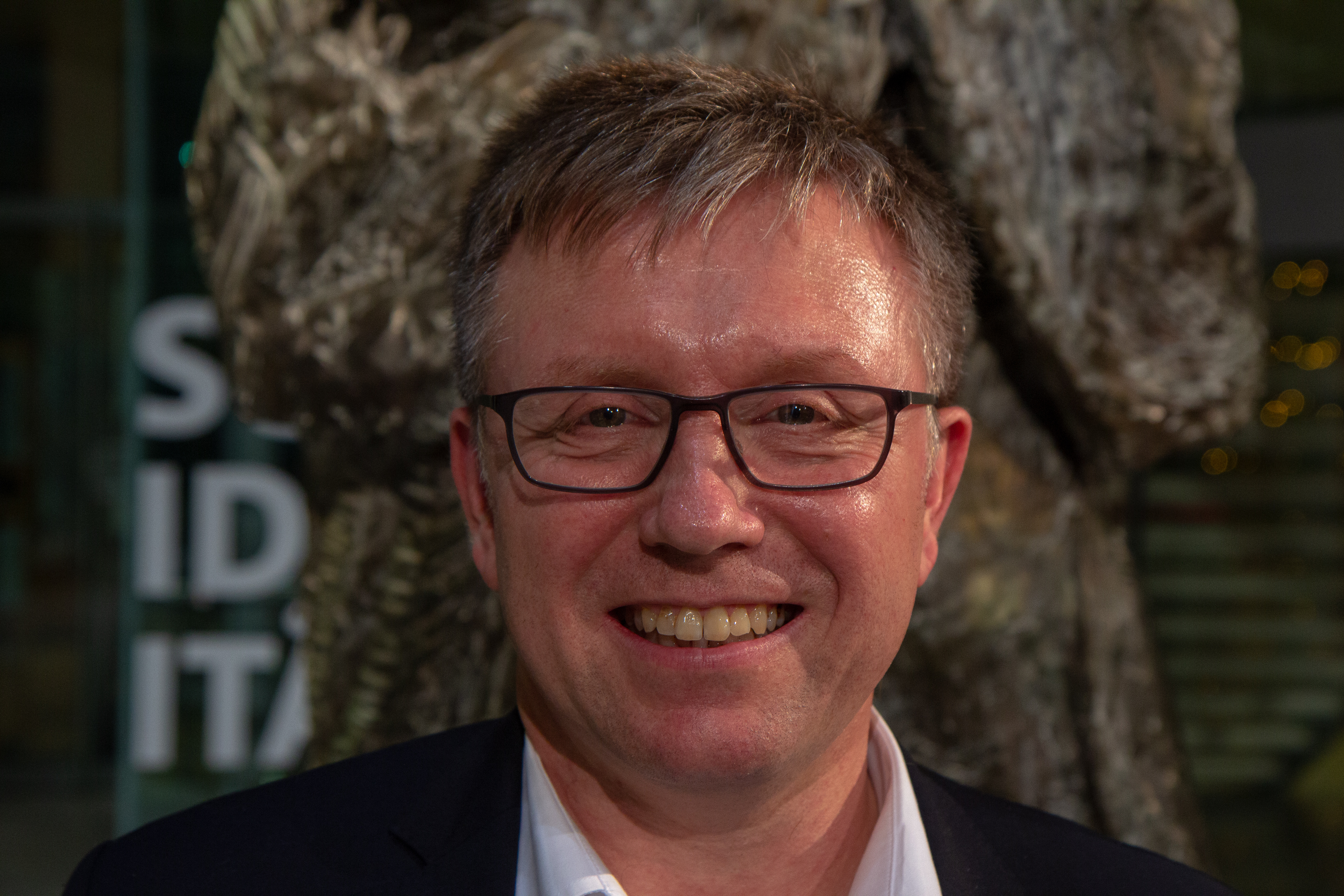
- Joachim at European delegates' conference in 2018

Member of the European Parliament
- Incumbent
- Assumed office 1 July 2014
- Constituency: Germany

Personal details
- Born: 28 October 1962 (age 63) Rastatt, Baden-Württemberg, Germany
- Party: German; Social Democratic Party; European Union; Party of European Socialists
- Education: University of Marburg; University of Bremen

Joachim Schuster (born 28 October 1962 in Rastatt) is a German politician of the Social Democratic Party (SPD) who has been serving as a Member of the European Parliament (MEP) since 2014, representing Germany as part of the Party of European Socialists. From 1999 until 2006, Schuster was member of the Bürgerschaft of Bremen. From 2006 until December 2012, State Council in Bremen, first of work, youth and social issues, then of health and science.

== Education and early career ==
Schuster was studying political science from 1984 until 1989 at the University of Marburg and graduated in 1993 at the University of Bremen with an analysis of the perspectives of the European Economic and Monetary Union. From 1991 until 1994 and from 1997 until 1999 he was research associate in two different research projects in regard to questions of the European Integration and the role of European trade unions.

Further, between 1994 and 1999 he was self-employed in the field of policy consultation and between 1999 and 2006 he was the manager of the Institute for applied social and political sciences.

== Political career ==
Schuster started his political career in the student council and in the peace movement. In 1982 he joined the Social Democratic Party(SPD). There he started at the group of the young socialists in the SPD (Jusos), later he got involved in different positions in the SPD.

In 1999 Schuster became a deputy in the Bürgerschaft of Bremen until 2006. First, he was the speaker for environmental issues, afterwards he became speaker for social issues in his parliamentary group. Between 2006 and 2012 he was State Council in Bremen, first for work, youth and social issues, later for health and sciences.

In April 2013 the state party conference of the SPD Bremen nominated Schuster as candidate for the elections of the European Parliament on 25 May 2014, where he then became elected as Member of the European Parliament. In his political views Schuster is a left-wing politician.

=== Member of the European Parliament, 2014–present ===
Joachim Schuster is a vice chairman of the SPD group in the Parliament and responsible for the relations to the SPD-Group of the German Bundestag. He is member of the Committee on International Trade (INTA) and substitute member of the Committee on Employment and Social Affairs (EMPL). His main topics in the INTA are about Africa (especially the southern African states), Ukraine, CETA and TTIP, in the EMPL he focuses on digitalization.

In addition to his committee assignments, Schuster is substitute member of the EU delegation to the ACP–EU Joint Parliamentary Assembly and with the national parliaments of Ukraine, Moldova, Belarus, Armenia, Azerbaijan and Georgia (EURONEST). He is also a member of the European Parliament Intergroup on Trade Unions and the European Parliament Intergroup on Western Sahara.

== Other activities ==
- Business Forum of the Social Democratic Party of Germany, Member of the Political Advisory Board (since 2020)
- German United Services Trade Union (ver.di), Member
- Centre for Social Policy of the University of Bremen, Honorary member of the Scientific Advisory Board
- Europa-Union Bremen, Member of the Executive Board

== Personal life ==
Schuster is married and father of two children.

== Publications ==
- SPD Bundesparteitag: Sozialdemokratische Kompetenz in der Wirtschaftspolitik SPW 210, Dortmund 2015, ISSN 0170-4613
- mit Dominika Biegón: Strukturreformen neu denken. Das Europäische Semester und der Jahreswachstumsbericht 2016 Friedrich-Ebert-Stiftung, Berlin 2015, ISBN 978-3-95861-371-3.
- Ohne soziale Dimension hat die EU keine Zukunft. Stellungnahme des Europäischen Parlaments. In: Europa Kommunal, 2/2017, Rat der Gemeinden und Regionen Europas, Köln 2017, ISSN 1866-1904
- Investitionsschutz á la CETA reicht nicht. Ohne Investorenpflichten wäre ein multilaterales Investitionsabkommen schädlich Internationale Politik und Gesellschaft 2017
- mit Dominika Biegón und Wolfgang Kowalsky: Schöne neue Arbeitswelt? Wie eine Antwort der EU auf die Plattformökonomie aussehen könnte Friedrich-Ebert-Stiftung, Berlin 2017, ISBN 978-3-95816-961-6.
- Für einen Paradigmenwechsel in der Handelspolitik. In: Helmut Scholz: handel(n) von links. VSA Verlag, Hamburg 2017, ISBN 978-3-89965-747-0.

== See also ==
- List of members of the European Parliament, 2014–19
