= Petar Kurumbashev =

Bulgarian politician

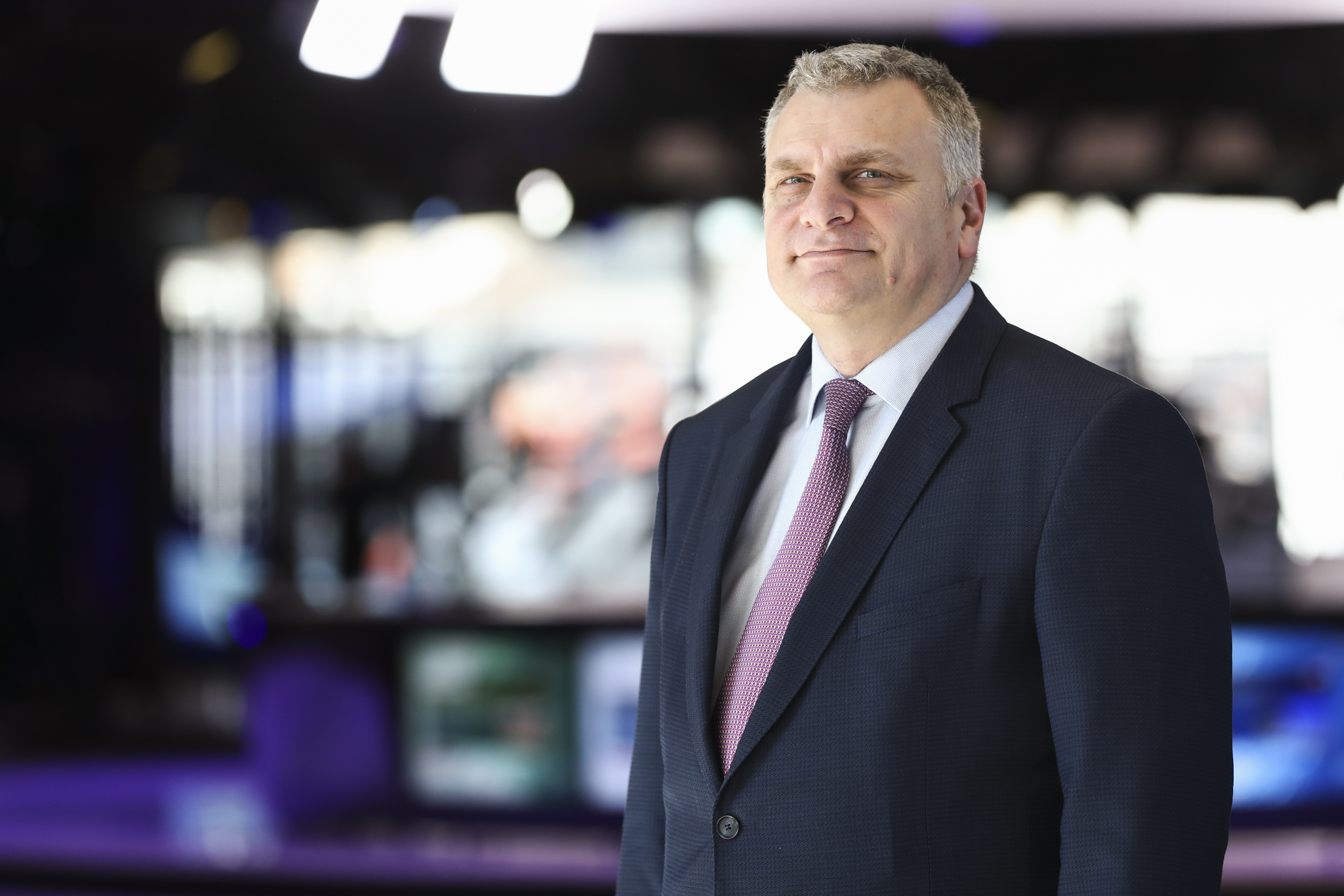
Peter Kurumbashev

Petar Atanassov Kurumbashev (Bulgarian: Петър Атанасов Курумбашев) is a Bulgarian politician who served as a MEP in the EU Parliament's 8th term from 2017 to 2019 from the Bulgaria constituency.
