= Progressive Alliance of Socialists and Democrats =

Centre-left political group of the European Parliament

- European Parliament group
- Name: Progressive Alliance of Socialists and Democrats
- English abbr.: S&D (23 June 2009 – present) Older: PES (21 April 1993 – 22 June 2009) SOC (1958 – 21 April 1993) S (23 June 1953 – 1958)
- French abbr.: S&D (23 June 2009 – present) Older: PSE (21 April 1993 – 22 June 2009) SOC (1958 – 21 April 1993) S (23 June 1953 – 1958)
- Formal name: Group of the Progressive Alliance of Socialists and Democrats in the European Parliament (23 June 2009 – present) Older: Socialist Group in the European Parliament (20 July 2004 – 23 June 2009) Group of the Party of European Socialists (21 April 1993 – 20 July 2004) Socialist Group (1958 – 21 April 1993) Group of the Socialists (23 June 1953 – 1958)
- Ideology: Social democracy Pro-Europeanism
- Political position: Centre-left
- European parties: Party of European Socialists
- Associated organisations: Progressive Alliance; Socialist International
- From: 23 June 1953
- To: Present
- Chaired by: Iratxe García
- MEP(s): 135 / 720 (19%)
- Website: socialistsanddemocrats.eu

The Progressive Alliance of Socialists and Democrats (S&D) is the political group in the European Parliament of the Party of European Socialists (PES). The Progressive Alliance of Socialists and Democrats was officially founded as a Socialist Group on 29 June 1953, which makes it the second oldest political group in the European Parliament after the European People's Party Group (EPP Group). It adopted its present-day name on 23 June 2009. Centre-left in orientation, the group mostly comprises social democratic parties and is affiliated with the Progressive Alliance and Socialist International.

Until the 1999 European Parliament elections, it was the largest group in the Parliament, but since then it has always been the second-largest group. During the eighth EU Parliament Assembly, the S&D was the only Parliament group with representation from all 27 EU member states. In the current EU Parliament the S&D is currently composed of 135 members from 25 member states.

In the European Council, eight out of 27 heads of state and government belong to PES parties and in the European Commission, 8 out of 27 Commissioners come from PES parties.

== History ==
The Socialist Group was one of the first three groups to be created when it was founded on 23 June 1953 in the Common Assembly of the European Coal and Steel Community. The Common Assembly was the predecessor of the European Parliament. A group bureau and secretariat was established in Luxembourg. The group continued through the creation of the appointed Parliament in 1958 and, when the Parliament became an elected body in 1979 following the first European election, the group became the largest in terms of returned MEPs. It has ever since remained the largest or second-largest Group.

In 1987, the Single European Act came into force and the group began co-operating with the European People's Party (EPP) to secure the majorities needed under the cooperation procedure. The left–right coalition between the Socialists and EPP has dominated the Parliament since then. Further, with some exceptions, the post of President of the Parliament has alternated between the two groups ever since.

Meanwhile, the national parties making up the group were also organising themselves on a European level outside the Parliament, creating the Confederation of Socialist Parties of the European Community in 1974. The Confederation was succeeded by the Party of European Socialists (PES), in 1992. As a result, the parliamentary group was renamed the Group of the Party of European Socialists on 21 April 1993.

In 1999, the Parliament refused to approve the Santer Commission's handling of the EU budget. Allegations of corruption centred on two PES Commissioners, Édith Cresson and Manuel Marín. The group initially supported the Commission but later withdrew their support, forcing the Commission to resign.

The group was renamed again to the Socialist Group in the European Parliament on 20 July 2004, and was given a different logo, to further distinguish the PES group organisation from the PES European political party.

In 2007, the Socialist Group was the second largest group in Parliament, with MEPs from all but two member states, Latvia and Cyprus. However, the 2009 European election saw a reduction in the number of PES MEPs returned from 2004. The group sought additional members in the Democratic Party of Italy, which was not affiliated to the PES in 2009. By the conclusion of the 2004–2009 parliamentary term, the Democratic Party had 8 MEPs in the Socialist Group (coming from the Democrats of the Left), but also had eight MEPs in ALDE Group (coming from the Daisy). The Democratic Party is a big tent centre-left party, strongly influenced by social democracy and the Christian left, and had MEPs who were former Christian Democrats or had other political views. As such, a new and more inclusive group name had to be found.

The group was going to be named Alliance of Socialists and Democrats for Europe (ASDE) but this was seemed too similar to Alliance of Liberals and Democrats for Europe (ALDE). The name Progressive Alliance of Socialists and Democrats was suggested on 18 June by group president Martin Schulz and it was renamed on 23 June 2009. The English abbreviation was initially unclear, being variously reported as PASD, S&D Group or PASDE. Dissatisfaction by Socialist MEPs towards the new name led Martin Schulz to admit that the name was still under consideration and that the group was to be referred to as the "Socialists and Democrats" until a final title was chosen. On 14 July 2009, the first day of the constitutive session of the 2009–2014 term, the full formal group name was Group of the Progressive Alliance of Socialists and Democrats in the European Parliament and the abbreviation was S&D.

The S&D Group joined the Progressive Alliance upon its official foundation on 22 May 2013 and is a member of the organisation's board. The group was formerly an associated organisation of the Socialist International.

== Presidents of the European Parliament ==
For presidents of the European Parliament from the group, see President of the European Parliament.

== Organisation ==
The group is led by a President and a Bureau of vice-presidents. There is also a Treasurer and a Secretary General.

=== Presidents of the group ===
Presidents of the group include:

Chairperson	Took office	Left office	Country (Constituency)	Party
Guy Mollet	1953	1956	France	French Section of the Workers' International
Hendrik Fayat	1956	1958	Belgium	Belgian Socialist Party
Pierre-Olivier Lapie	1958	1959	France	French Section of the Workers' International
Willi Birkelbach	1959	1964	Germany	Social Democratic Party
Käte Strobel	1964	1967	Germany	Social Democratic Party
Francis Vals	1967	1974	France	French Section of the Workers' International
Georges Spénale	1974	1975	France	Socialist Party
Ludwig Fellermaier	1975	1979	Germany	Social Democratic Party
Ernest Glinne	1979	1984	Belgium (French)	Socialist Party
Rudi Arndt	1984	1989	Germany	Social Democratic Party
Jean-Pierre Cot	1989	1994	France	Socialist Party
Pauline Green	1994	1999	United Kingdom (London North)	Labour Party
Enrique Barón Crespo	1999	2004	Spain	Spanish Socialist Workers' Party
Martin Schulz	2004	2012	Germany	Social Democratic Party
Hannes Swoboda	2012	2014	Austria	Social Democratic Party
Martin Schulz	2014 (May)	2014 (June)	Germany	Social Democratic Party
Gianni Pittella	2014	2018	Italy (Southern)	Democratic Party
Udo Bullmann	2018 (March)	2019	Germany	Social Democratic Party
Iratxe García	2019	present	Spain	Spanish Socialist Workers' Party

=== 2024–2029 legislature ===
Iratxe García Pérez remained as President, as well as Eero Heinäluoma as Treasurer. Some of the vice-presidents have changed.

- Alex Agius Saliba (Malta),
- Gabriele Bischoff (Germany),
- Mohammed Chamim (Netherlands),
- Christophe Clergeau (France),
- Heléne Fritzon (Sweden),
- Camila Laureti (Italy),
- Giannis Maniatis (Greece),
- Ana Catarina Mendes (Portugal),
- Kathleen Van Brempt (Belgium)

==== Treasurer ====
- Eero Heinäluoma (Finland)

=== 2019–2024 legislature ===
==== Vice-presidents ====
Following the 2019 European elections, S&D Members elected their new political Bureau made up of the President Iratxe García Pérez, nine vice-presidents and the treasurer. As a consequence of Brexit, British S&D Member Claude Moraes had to resign from his position as vice-president. Marek Belka has been appointed the new vice-president.

- Pedro Marques (Portugal),
- Elisabetta Gualmini (Italy),
- Biljana Borzan (Croatia),
- Alex Agius Saliba (Malta),
- Gabriele Bischoff (Germany),
- Heléne Fritzon (Sweden),
- Mohammed Chahim (Netherlands),
- Rovana Plumb (Romania),
- Marek Belka (Poland)

==== Treasurer ====
- Eero Heinäluoma (Finland)

=== 2014–2019 legislature ===
==== Vice-presidents ====
Previous vice-presidents of the group appointed at the start of the current legislature in 2014

- Victor Boștinaru (Romania),
- Tanja Fajon (Slovenia),
- Isabelle Thomas (France),
- Enrique Guerrero Salom (Spain),
- Marju Lauristin (Estonia),
- Jörg Leichtfried (Austria),
- Knut Fleckenstein (Germany),
- Maria João Rodrigues (Portugal),
- Kathleen Van Brempt (Belgium),

==== Treasurer ====
- Péter Niedermüller (Hungary)

=== 2009–2014 legislature ===
==== Vice-presidents ====
Previous vice-presidents of the group appointed at the start of the 2009 legislature:

- María Badía i Cutchet (PSOE, Spain) – Communication Policy and Public Relations
- Monika Beňová (Smer, Slovakia) – Europe of the Citizens
- Véronique De Keyser (PS, Belgium) – Human Rights, Development and International Trade
- Stephen Hughes (Labour, United Kingdom) – Economy and Social Policy
- Stéphane Le Foll (PS, France) – Budget and Territorial Cohesion
- Adrian Severin (PSD, Romania) – Foreign Policy and Defence
- Gianluca Susta (PD, Italy) – Agriculture and Fisheries
- Hannes Swoboda (SPÖ, Austria) – Parliamentary Affairs and Relations with International Organisations
- Marita Ulvskog (SAP, Sweden) – Sustainable Development and Competition

=== 2004–2009 legislature ===
==== Vice-presidents ====
Previous vice-presidents of the group for the 2004–2009 term were as follows:

- Harlem Désir (PS, France)
- Bárbara Dührkop Dührkop (PSOE, Spain)
- Robert Goebbels (LSAP, Luxembourg)
- Linda McAvan (Labour Party, UK)
- Pasqualina Napoletano (Sinistra Democratica, Italy)
- Hannes Swoboda (SPÖ, Austria)
- Kristian Vigenin (BSP, Bulgaria)
- Jan Marinus Wiersma (PvdA, Netherlands)

==== Treasurers ====
Current/previous Treasurers of the group are as follows:

- Magda Kósáné Kovács (Hungary, MSZP)

=== Secretaries General ===
Current/previous Secretaries General of the group are as follows:

- Manfred Michel (West Germany) c. 1970 – c. 1985
- Paolo Falcone (Italy) c. 1986 – 1989
- Julian Priestley (UK) 1989–1994
- Joan Prat (Spain) 1994–1999 (Deputy Sec Gen Richard Corbett UK)
- Christine Verger (France) 1999–2004
- David Harley (UK) 2004–2006
- Anna Colombo (Italy) 2006–2014
- Javier Moreno Sanchez (Spain) 2014–2019
- Michael Hoppe (Germany) 2019–2021
- Anton Beumer (Netherlands) 2022–

== MEPs ==
=== 10th European Parliament ===
State	National party	European alliance	MEPs
Austria	Social Democratic Party of Austria; Sozialdemokratische Partei Österreichs (SPÖ)	PES	5 / 20
Belgium	Socialist Party; Parti Socialiste (PS)	PES	2 / 22
Belgium	Forward; Vooruit	PES	2 / 22
Bulgaria	Bulgarian Socialist Party; Българска социалистическа партия (БСП); Bulgarska sotsialisticheska partiya (BSP)	PES	2 / 17
Croatia	Social Democratic Party of Croatia; Socijaldemokratska partija Hrvatske (SDP)	PES	4 / 12
Cyprus	Democratic Party; Δημοκρατικό Κόμμα; Dimokratikó Kómma (DIKO)	None	1 / 6
Denmark	Social Democrats; Socialdemokraterne	PES	3 / 15
Estonia	Social Democratic Party; Sotsiaaldemokraatlik Erakond (SDE)	PES	2 / 7
Finland	Social Democratic Party of Finland; Suomen sosialidemokraattinen puolue Finlands socialdemokratiska parti	PES	2 / 15
France	Socialist Party; Parti socialiste (PS)	PES	10 / 81
France	Public place Place publique (PP)	PES	3 / 81
Germany	Social Democratic Party of Germany; Sozialdemokratische Partei Deutschlands (SPD)	PES	14 / 96
Greece	Panhellenic Socialist Movement - Movement for Change; Panellínio Sosialistikó Kínima– Kínima Allagís (PASOK-KINAL)	PES	4 / 21
Hungary	Democratic Coalition; Demokratikus Koalíció	PES	2 / 21
Ireland	Labour Party; Páirtí an Lucht Oibre	PES	1 / 14
Italy	Democratic Party; Partito Democratico (PD)	PES	18 / 76
Italy	Solidary Democracy; Democrazia Solidale (DemoS)	None	1 / 76
Latvia	Social Democratic Party "Harmony"; Sociāldemokrātiskā partija "Saskaņa" (SDPS)	PES	1 / 9
Lithuania	Social Democratic Party of Lithuania; Lietuvos socialdemokratų partija (LSDP)	PES	2 / 11
Luxembourg	Luxembourg Socialist Workers' Party; Lëtzebuerger Sozialistesch Aarbechterpartei; Parti ouvrier socialiste luxembourgeois Luxemburger Sozialistische Arbeiterpartei (LSAP)	PES	1 / 6
Malta	Labour Party; Partit Laburista (PL)	PES	3 / 6
Netherlands	Progressive Netherlands; Progressief Nederland (PRO)	PES	4 / 31
Poland	New Left; Nowa Lewica	PES	3 / 53
Portugal	Socialist Party; Partido Socialista (PS)	PES	8 / 21
Romania	Social Democratic Party; Partidul Social Democrat (PSD)	PES	10 / 33
Romania	Social Liberal Humanist Party; Partidul Umanist Social Liberal (PUSL)	None	1 / 33
Slovenia	Social Democrats; Socialni demokrati (SD)	PES	1 / 9
Spain	Spanish Socialist Workers' Party; Partido Socialista Obrero Español (PSOE)	PES	20 / 60
Sweden	Swedish Social Democratic Party; Sveriges socialdemokratiska arbetareparti (SAP)	PES	5 / 21
European Union	Total		135 / 720

=== 9th European Parliament ===
The S&D had MEPs from 26 of the 27 EU states, including 24 with more than one MEP (in red) and two (Luxembourg and Czech Republic) with exactly one MEP (pink). Ireland had no S&D MEPs.

State	National party	European alliance	MEPs
Austria	Social Democratic Party of Austria; Sozialdemokratische Partei Österreichs (SPÖ)	PES	5 / 19
Belgium	Socialist Party; Parti Socialiste (PS)	PES	1 / 21
Belgium	Forward; Vooruit	PES	1 / 21
Bulgaria	Bulgarian Socialist Party; Българска социалистическа партия (БСП); Bulgarska sotsialisticheska partiya (BSP)	PES	4 / 17
Croatia	Social Democratic Party of Croatia; Socijaldemokratska partija Hrvatske (SDP)	PES	4 / 12
Cyprus	Movement for Social Democracy; Κίνημα Σοσιαλδημοκρατών (ΚΣ); Kinima Sosialdimokraton (KS)	PES	1 / 6
Cyprus	Democratic Party; Δημοκρατικό Κόμμα; Dimokratikó Kómma (DIKO)	None	1 / 6
Czech Republic	Social Democracy; Sociální demokracie (SOCDEM)	PES	1 / 21
Denmark	Social Democrats; Socialdemokraterne	PES	3 / 14
Estonia	Social Democratic Party; Sotsiaaldemokraatlik Erakond (SDE)	PES	2 / 7
Finland	Social Democratic Party of Finland; Suomen sosialidemokraattinen puolue Finlands socialdemokratiska parti	PES	2 / 14
France	Socialist Party; Parti socialiste (PS)	PES	3 / 79
France	Public place Place publique (PP)	None	2 / 79
France	New Deal; Nouvelle Donne	None	1 / 79
France	Renaissance; Renaissance (RE)	None	1 / 79
Germany	Social Democratic Party of Germany; Sozialdemokratische Partei Deutschlands (SPD)	PES	16 / 96
Greece	Panhellenic Socialist Movement - Movement for Change; Panellínio Sosialistikó Kínima– Kínima Allagís (PASOK-KINAL)	PES	1 / 21
Greece	Independent; Theodoros Zagorakis	Independent	1 / 21
Hungary	Democratic Coalition; Demokratikus Koalíció (DK)	PES	4 / 21
Hungary	Opportunity Community; Esély Közösség (EK)	None	1 / 21
Italy	Democratic Party; Partito Democratico (PD)	PES	14 / 76
Italy	Independent; Giuliano Pisapia	Independent	1 / 76
Latvia	Social Democratic Party "Harmony"; Sociāldemokrātiskā partija "Saskaņa" (SDPS)	PES	1 / 8
Latvia	Honor to serve Riga; Gods kalpot Rīgai (GKR)	None	1 / 8
Lithuania	Social Democratic Party of Lithuania; Lietuvos socialdemokratų partija (LSDP)	PES	2 / 11
Luxembourg	Luxembourg Socialist Workers' Party; Lëtzebuerger Sozialistesch Aarbechterpartei; Parti ouvrier socialiste luxembourgeois Luxemburger Sozialistische Arbeiterpartei (LSAP)	PES	1 / 6
Malta	Labour Party; Partit Laburista (LP Malta)	PES	4 / 6
Netherlands	Labour Party; Partij van de Arbeid (PvdA)	PES	6 / 29
Poland	New Left; Nowa Lewica	PES	6 / 52
Poland	Independent; Leszek Miller	Independent	1 / 52
Portugal	Socialist Party; Partido Socialista (PS)	PES	9 / 21
Romania	Social Democratic Party; Partidul Social Democrat (PSD)	PES	7 / 33
Romania	PRO Romania; PRO România (PRO)	None	1 / 33
Romania	Social Liberal Humanist Party; Partidul Umanist Social Liberal (PUSL)	None	1 / 33
Slovakia	Independent; Róbert Hajšel	Independent	1 / 14
Slovenia	Social Democrats; Socialni demokrati (SD Slovenia)	PES	2 / 8
Spain	Spanish Socialist Workers' Party; Partido Socialista Obrero Español (PSOE)	PES	21 / 59
Sweden	Swedish Social Democratic Party; Sveriges socialdemokratiska arbetareparti (SAP)	PES	5 / 21
European Union	Total		139 / 705

=== From 6th to 8th European Parliament ===
State	National party	European alliance	MEPs 2004– 2009	MEPs 2009– 2014	MEPs 2014– 2019
Austria	Social Democratic Party of Austria; Sozialdemokratische Partei Österreichs	PES	7	4	5
Belgium	Socialist Party; Parti Socialiste	PES	4	3	3
Belgium	Socialist Party Different; Socialistische Partij Anders	PES	3	2	1
Bulgaria	Bulgarian Socialist Party; Българска социалистическа партия Bulgarska sotsialisticheska partiya	PES	5	4	4
Croatia	Social Democratic Party of Croatia; Socijaldemokratska partija Hrvatske	PES		5	4
Cyprus	Movement for Social Democracy; Κίνημα Σοσιαλδημοκρατών; Kinima Sosialdimokraton	PES		1	1
Cyprus	Democratic Party; Δημοκρατικό Κόμμα; Dimokratikó Kómma	None	1	1	1
Czech Republic	Czech Social Democratic Party; Česká strana sociálně demokratická	PES	2	7	4
Denmark	Social Democrats; Socialdemokraterne	PES	5	4	3
Estonia	Social Democratic Party; Sotsiaaldemokraatlik Erakond	PES	3	1	1
Finland	Social Democratic Party of Finland; Suomen sosialidemokraattinen puolue Finlands socialdemokratiska parti	PES	3	2	2
France	Socialist Party; Parti socialiste	PES	31	14	12
France	Radical Party of the Left; Parti radical de gauche	None			1
Germany	Social Democratic Party of Germany; Sozialdemokratische Partei Deutschlands	PES	24	23	27
Greece	Movement for Change (PASOK); Κίνημα Αλλαγής; Kinima Allagis	PES	8	6	2
Greece	Democratic Left; Δημοκρατική Αριστερά; Dimokratiki Aristera	None		1	
Greece	The River; Το Ποτάμι; To Potami	None			2
Hungary	Hungarian Socialist Party; Magyar Szocialista Párt	PES	9	4	2
Hungary	Democratic Coalition; Demokratikus Koalíció	None			2
Ireland	Labour Party; Páirtí an Lucht Oibre	PES	1	3	
Ireland	Nessa Childers (Independent)	None			1
Italy	Democrats of the Left; Democratici di Sinistra	PES	12		
Italy	Democratic Party; Partito Democratico	PES		21	31
Italy	Italian Democratic Socialists; Socialisti Democratici Italiani	PES	2		
Italy	Article 1 – Democratic and Progressive Movement; Articolo Uno – Movimento Democratico e Progressista	None			3
Italy	Italian Left; Sinistra Italiana	None			1
Italy	Possible; Possibile	None			1
Italy	United in the Olive Tree; Uniti nell'Ulivo	None	2		
Latvia	Social Democratic Party "Harmony"; Sociāldemokrātiskā partija "Saskaņa"	PES		1	1
Lithuania	Social Democratic Party of Lithuania; Lietuvos socialdemokratų partija	PES	2	3	2
Luxembourg	Luxembourg Socialist Workers' Party; Lëtzebuerger Sozialistesch Aarbechterpartei; Parti ouvrier socialiste luxembourgeois Luxemburger Sozialistische Arbeiterpartei	PES	1	1	1
Malta	Labour Party; Partit Laburista	PES	3	4	3
Netherlands	Labour Party; Partij van de Arbeid	PES	7	3	3
Poland	Democratic Left Alliance-Labor Union; Sojusz Lewicy Demokratycznej – Unia Pracy	PES	5	7	5
Poland	Self-Defence of the Republic of Poland; Samoobrona Rzeczpospolitej Polskiej	PES	2	1	
Poland	Social Democratic Party of Poland; Socjaldemokracja Polska	None	3		
Portugal	Socialist Party; Partido Socialista	PES	12	7	8
Romania	Social Democratic Party; Partidul Social Democrat	PES	10	11	14
Slovakia	Direction – Social Democracy; Smer – sociálna demokracia	PES	3	5	4
Slovenia	Social Democrats; Socialni demokrati	PES	1	2	1
Spain	Spanish Socialist Workers' Party; Partido Socialista Obrero Español	PES	24	21	14
Sweden	Swedish Social Democratic Party; Sveriges socialdemokratiska arbetareparti	PES	5	5	5
Sweden	Feminist Initiative; Feministiskt initiativ	None			1
United Kingdom	Labour Party	PES	19	13	20
Total			215	184	190
