= Susanne Melior =

German biologist and politician

Susanne Melior MEP
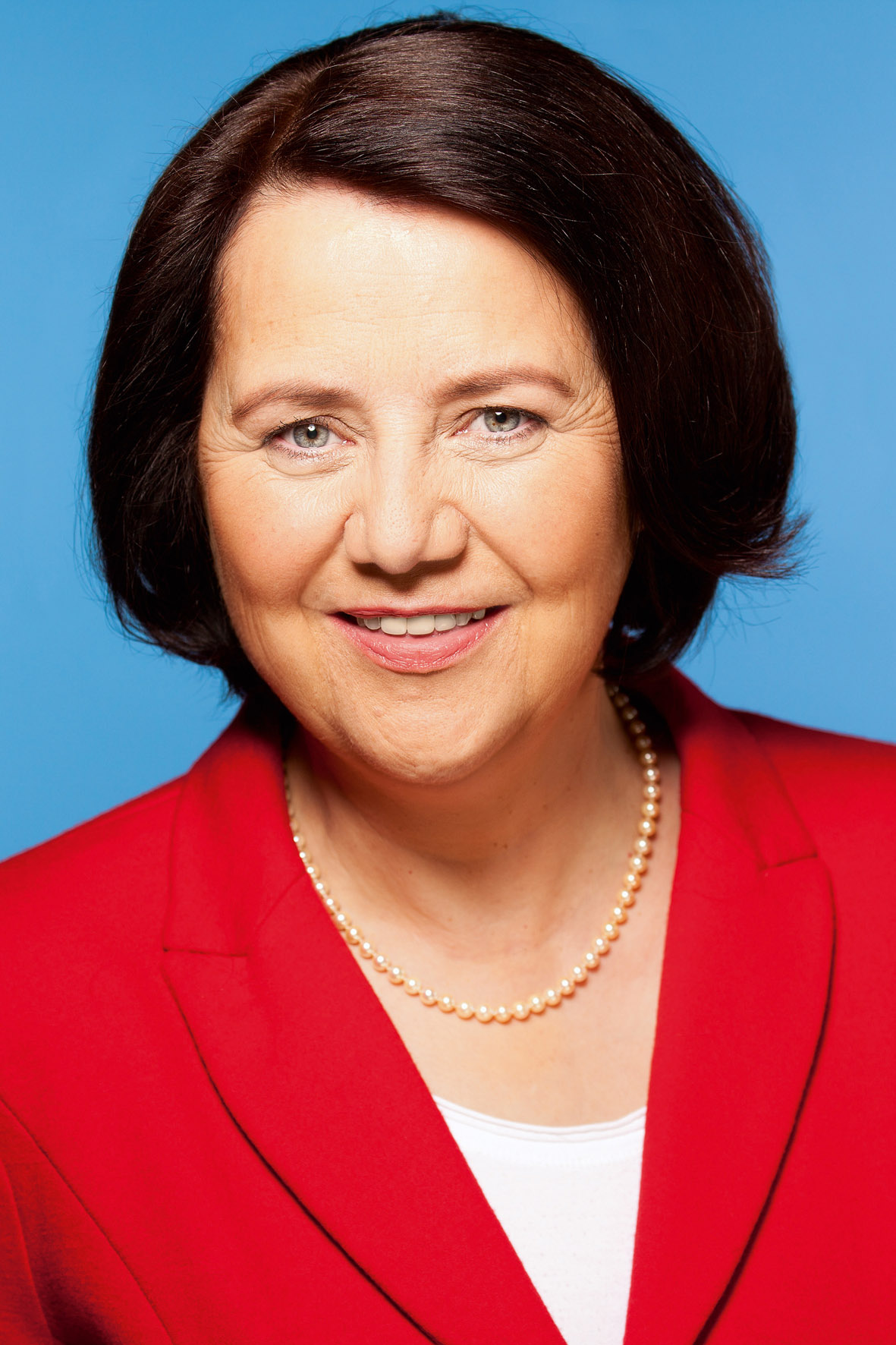

Member of the European Parliament
- In office 1 July 2014 – 2019
- Constituency: Germany

Personal details
- Born: 1 September 1958 (age 67) Havelberg, Saxony-Anhalt, Germany
- Party: German; Social Democratic Party; European Union; Party of European Socialists

Susanne Melior (born 1 September 1958) is a German biologist and politician who served as Member of the European Parliament (MEP) from 2014 until 2019. She is a member of the Social Democratic Party, part of the Party of European Socialists.

== Early life and career ==
Melior undertook her secondary education at the Johann Heinrich Pestalozzi Extended Secondary School gymnasium and completed her higher education at the University of Greifswald; studying Microbiology. She was later employed at the Bad Frankenhausen District Hospital as a biologist. She also worked as a research assistant, an equal opportunities adviser at the State Parliament of Brandenburg.

== Political career ==
From 2004 to 2014 Melior was a Member of the State Parliament of Brandenburg. In addition, she was involved in local politics serving as a member of the Potsdam-Mittelmark District Assembly from 1998 until 2014 and was Langerwisch municipal representative from 1998 until 2003. She served as Chair of the Social Democratic Party group in both positions.

As Member of the European Parliament, Melior served on the Committee on the Environment, Public Health and Food Safety (2014-2019) and the Parliament's delegation to the EU-Albania Stabilisation and Association Parliamentary Committee (2014-2019). In addition to her committee assignments, she is a member of the European Parliament Intergroup on the Welfare and Conservation of Animals.

In June 2018, Melior announced that she would not stand in the 2019 European elections but instead resign from active politics by the end of the parliamentary term.

== Other activities ==
- Max Planck Institute of Molecular Plant Physiology, Member of the Board of Trustees
