= Tania González Peñas =

Spanish politician

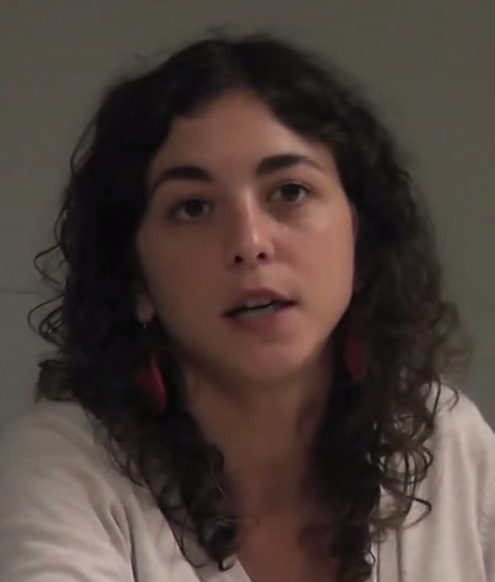
- Tania González Peñas in 2014

Member of the European Parliament

Personal details
- Born: Tania González Peñas; 18 October 1982 (age 43) Avilés, Spain
- Party: Podemos

Tania González Peñas (born 18 October 1982 in Avilés, Asturias) is a Spanish politician, political scientist, and MEP of Podemos, since September 11, 2014, when she replaced Carlos Jiménez Villarejo, who was one of the five members of the party elected in the 2014 European Parliament election.
