= Enrique Guerrero Salom =

Spanish politician

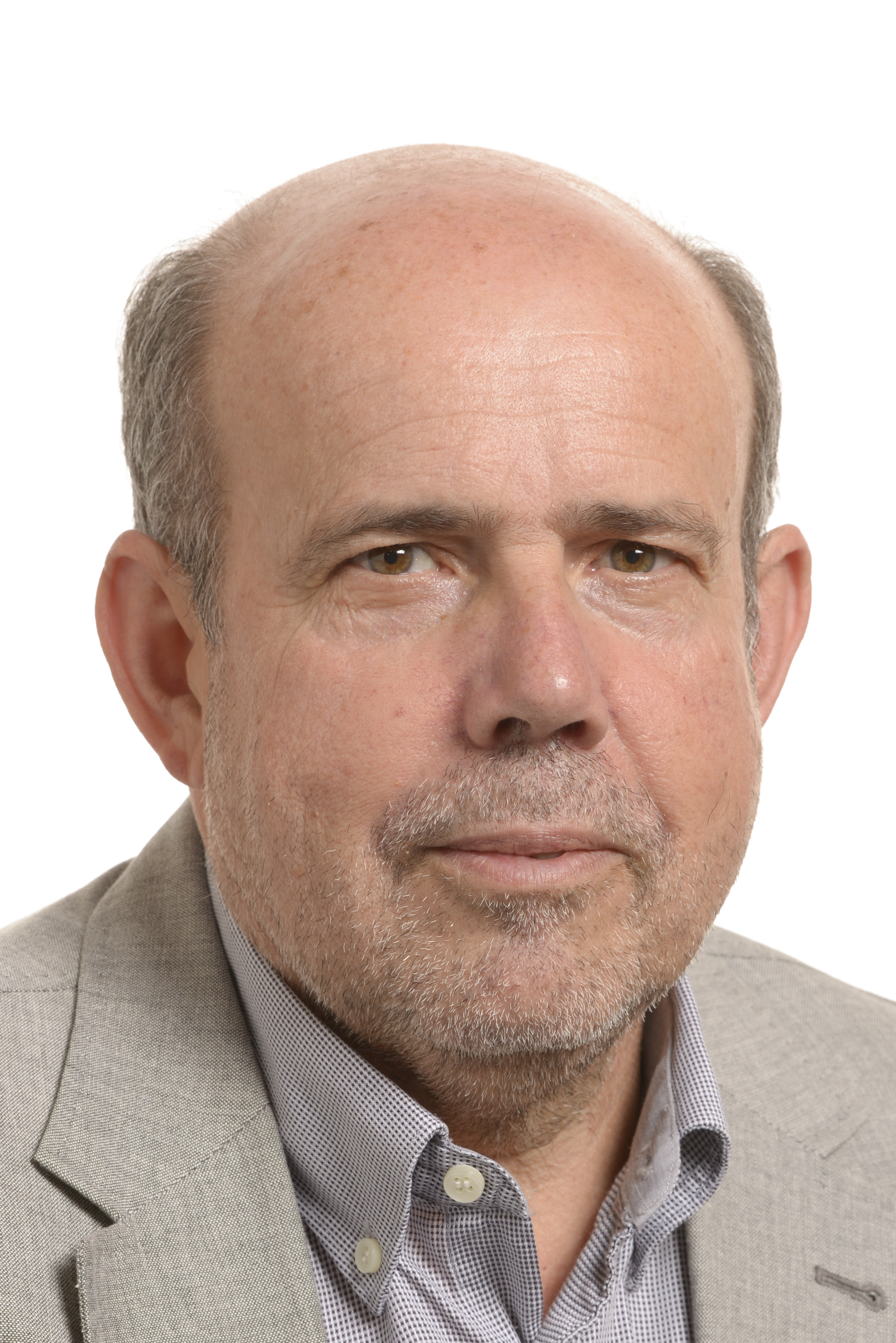

Member of the European Parliament
- In office 14 July 2009 – 2019
- Constituency: Spain

Personal details
- Born: 28 August 1948 (age 77) Carcaixent, Spain
- Party: Spanish Socialist Workers Party
- Occupation: Politician

Enrique Guerrero Salom (born 28 August 1948) is a Spanish politician who served as a Member of the European Parliament from 2009 until 2019, representing Spain for the Spanish Socialist Workers Party. From 2012 until 2014 he served as Vice-Chair of the Progressive Alliance of Socialists and Democrats group in the European Parliament. Between 1993 and 1996 he served as Secretary of State for Relations with the Cortes.
