= Martina Werner =

German politician

Martina Werner MEP
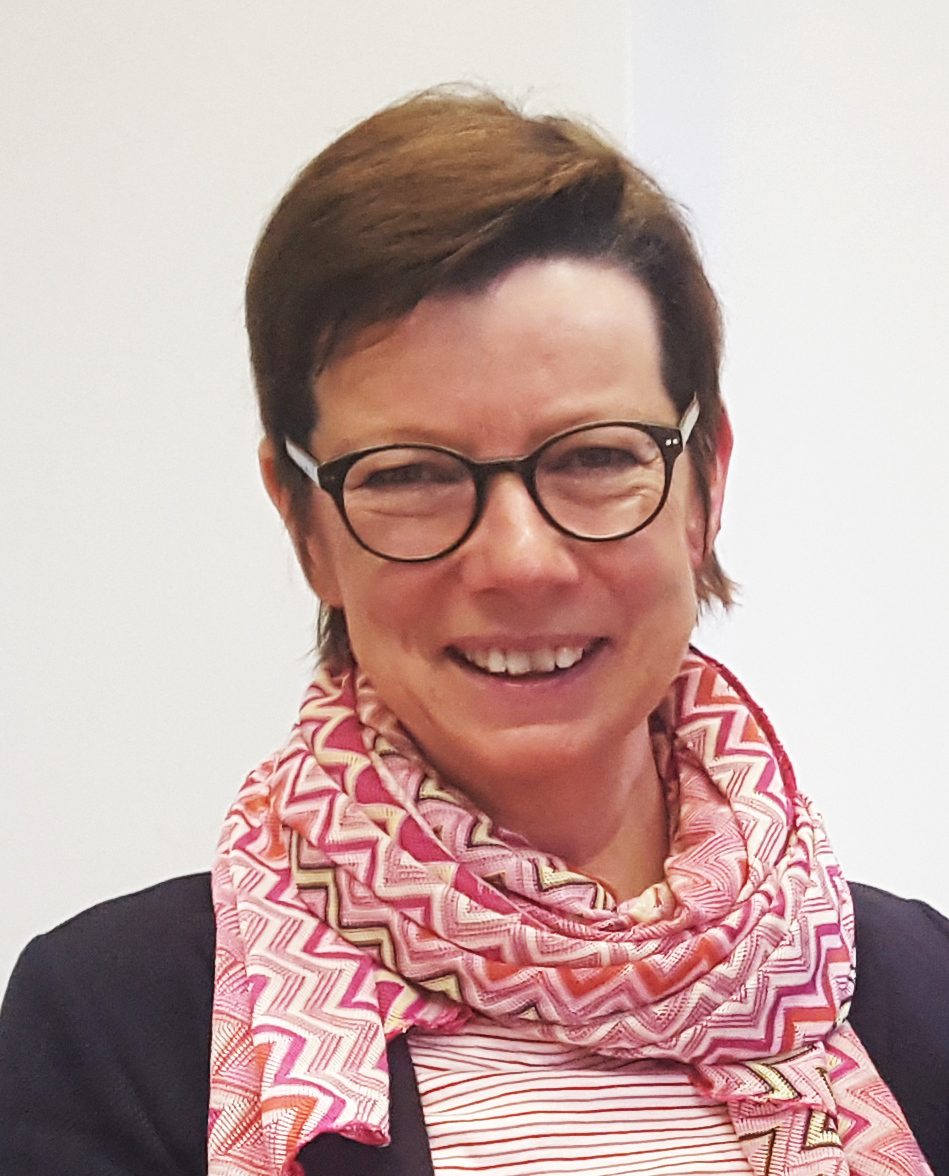

Member of the European Parliament
- Incumbent
- Assumed office 1 July 2014
- Constituency: Germany

Personal details
- Born: 28 December 1961 (age 64) Kassel, Hessen, Germany
- Party: German; Social Democratic Party; European Union; Party of European Socialists
- Education: University of Kassel

Martina Werner (born 28 December 1961) is a German politician and Member of the European Parliament (MEP) representing Germany since July 2014. She is a member of the Social Democratic Party, part of the Party of European Socialists.

Before her election Werner was educated at the Herder School in Kassel before undertaking professional training in hotel management. In 1991 she graduated from the University of Kassel with a degree in economics. She later worked in business development and investment management.

== Parliamentary service ==
- Member, Committee on Industry, Research and Energy (2014-)
- Member, Delegation to the ACP-EU Joint Parliamentary Assembly (2014-)

In addition to her committee assignments, Werner serves as a member of the European Parliament Intergroup on Western Sahara.

== Other activities ==
- IG Bergbau, Chemie, Energie, Member
- German United Services Trade Union (ver.di), Member
