= Knut Fleckenstein =

German politician and former Member of the European Parliament (born 1953)

Knut Fleckenstein MEP
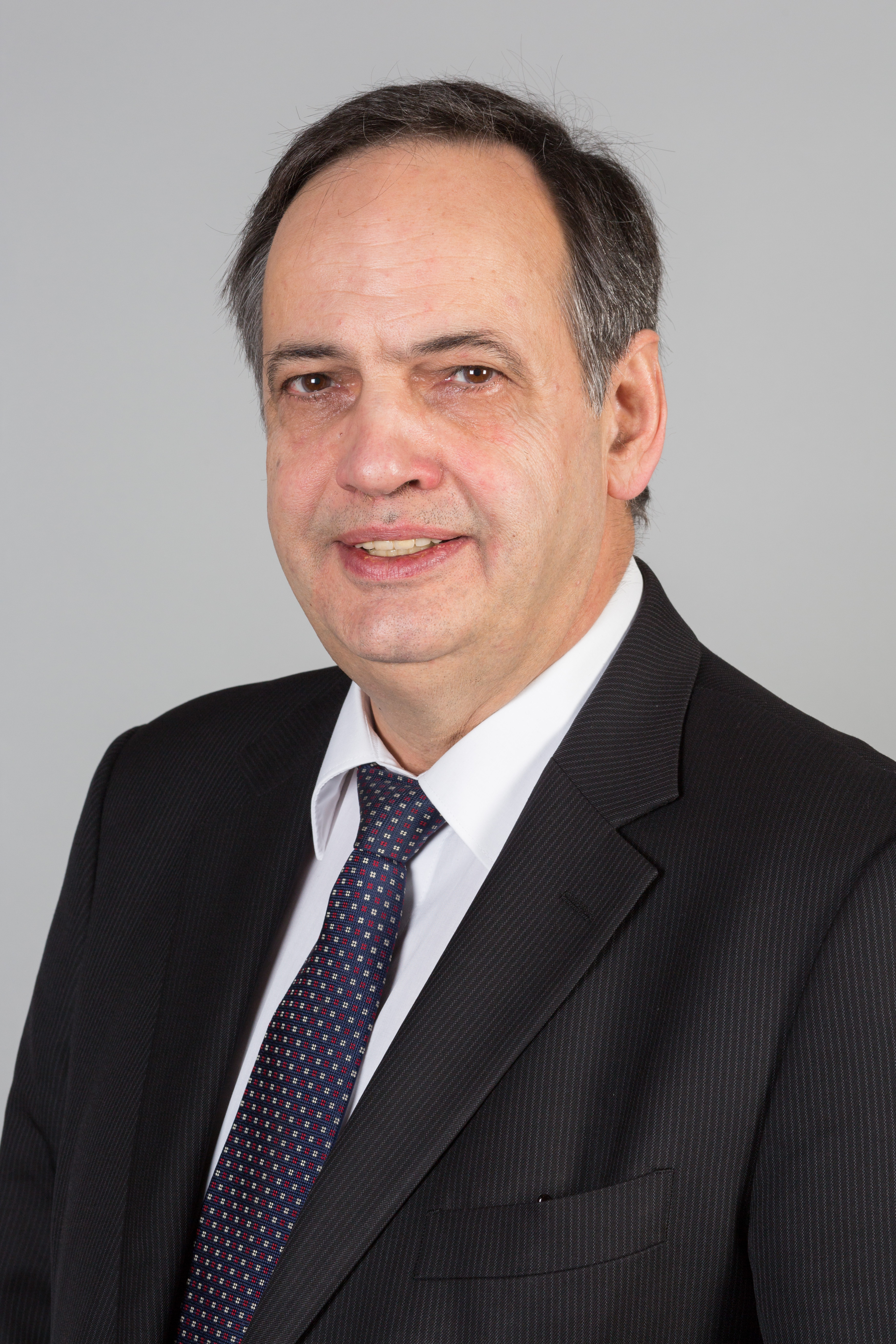
- Fleckenstein in 2014

Member of the European Parliament
- In office 14 July 2009 – 2019
- Constituency: Germany

Personal details
- Born: 20 December 1953 (age 72) Bad Nauheim, Germany
- Party: German: Social Democratic Party; EU: Party of European Socialists
- Website: knut-fleckenstein.eu

Video introduction (English)

Knut Fleckenstein (born 20 December 1953) is a German politician and former Member of the European Parliament (MEP) from Germany. He is a member of the Social Democratic Party of Germany, part of the Party of European Socialists.

He was elected to the European Parliament in 2009, prior to which he had managed the Workers' Samaritan Federation in Hamburg.

Since July 2020, he serves as an official adviser to the speaker of Albania's parliament, Gramoz Ruci.

== Member of the European Parliament, 2009–2019 ==
Between 2009 and 2014, Fleckenstein served on the Committee on Transport and Tourism. From 2014, he was member of the Committee on Foreign Affairs (AFET). In addition, he served on the delegation to the EU-Russia Parliamentary Cooperation Committee since 2009. He was the Parliament's rapporteur on market access to port services and financial transparency.

In addition to his committee assignments, Fleckenstein was a member of the European Parliament Intergroup on the Welfare and Conservation of Animals

Within the parliamentary group of the Progressive Alliance of Socialists and Democrats, Fleckenstein served as vice-president responsible for foreign policy, human rights, trade and development.

== Other activities ==
- European Endowment for Democracy (EED), Member of the Board of Governors
- Ernst Deutsch Theater, Chairman of the Supervisory Board
- Europa-Kolleg Hamburg, Member of the Board of Trustees
- Hamburgische Regenbogenstiftung, Member of the Board of Trustees
- BERTINI Award, Chairman of the Board of Directors (since 2007)
- Samaritan International, President

== Political positions ==
In his capacity as vice-chair of the Progressive Alliance of Socialists and Democrats, Fleckenstein called in August 2015 for a "new initiative for political dialogue in Europe" after the annexation of Crimea by the Russian Federation and the removal "from the sanction lists of both Russia and the European Union all members of national Parliaments as well as the European Parliament." His call also targeted the EU sanctions list, which imposed visa bans and asset freezes on 151 people in Russia, including dozens of members of the State Duma, the lower house of the Russian parliament.
