= Victor Boștinaru =

Romanian politician

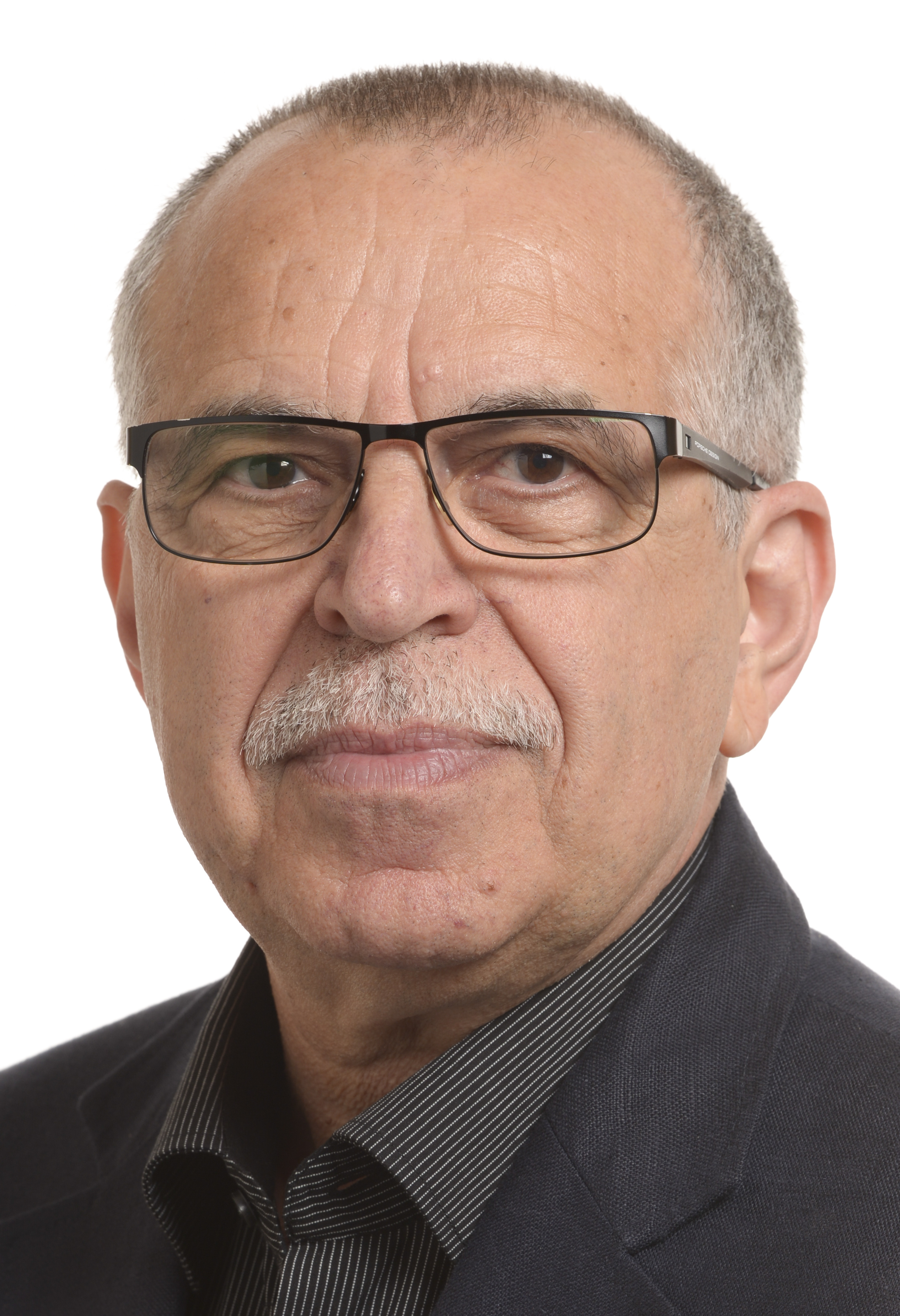

Member of the European Parliament
- In office 2007–2019
- Constituency: Romania

Member of the Chamber of Deputies
- In office 1990–2000
- Constituency: Dâmboviţa County

Secretary of State, Ministry of Foreign Affairs
- In office November 2004 – December 2004

Personal details
- Born: 17 May 1952 (age 74) Romania
- Party: Social Democratic Party (Romania)
- Other political affiliations: Progressive Alliance of Socialists and Democrats (EU affiliation)
- Education: University of Bucharest (History, Geography, Philosophy)
- Committees: Committee for Regional Development, Committee on Petitions

Victor Boştinaru (born 17 May 1952) is a Romanian member of the European Parliament and sits on the Committee for Regional Development (REGI) and Committee on Petitions (PETI). He is a member of the Social Democratic Party of Romania and in the European Union he is part of the Progressive Alliance of Socialists and Democrats.

== Education ==
Boştinaru was educated at the University of Bucharest and holds two degrees from the university (achieved in 1974 and 1981). His degrees are in the areas of History, Geography and Philosophy. Boştinaru worked as Professor of History and Geography at multiple establishments.

== Political life ==
=== Positions within Romania ===
In 1991, Boştinaru became Vice President of the National Salvation Front and Vice President of the Democratic Party. Boştinaru later went on to become chairman of the National Salvation Front.

In 1990, he was elected as the MP for Dâmboviţa, and served in this position until 2000. During his time as an MP he sat on committees of foreign affairs and the Committee of the Chamber of Deputies.

In April, Boştinaru became the leader of the Democratic Party Parliamentary Group and served as a member of the Romanian delegation to the OSCE Parliamentary Assembly (1992–1996).

=== Other positions ===
Other posts Boştinaru subsequently held include:

- Deputy Leader of the Democratic Party Parliamentary Group (April 1994).
- Secretary of Foreign Policy of the Chamber of Deputies, Romanian Parliament (March–November 1996).
- Chairman of Foreign Policy of the Chamber of Deputies, Parliament of Romania (1996–2000).
- Member of the European Integration Committee of the Chamber of Deputies, Parliament of Romania (1996–2000).
- President of the European Integration Committee of the Chamber of Deputies, Romanian Parliament (July - December 2000).
- Secretary of State, Ministry of Foreign Affairs (November 2004-December 2004).
- Adviser for Foreign Policy and International Relations of the President of the Chamber of Deputies (March 2001 - October 2004).
- Adviser for Foreign Policy and International Relations of the President of the Chamber of Deputies (January 2005 - April 2006).
- USIA Program Participant (March 2003).
- Founder and Vice President of National Advisory Council for Euro-Atlantic Integration (1993–1996).
- Founder and Secretary General of the Atlantic Council of Romania (1993–1996).
- Member of the Manfred Worner Foundation.
