= Isabelle Thomas (politician) =

French politician

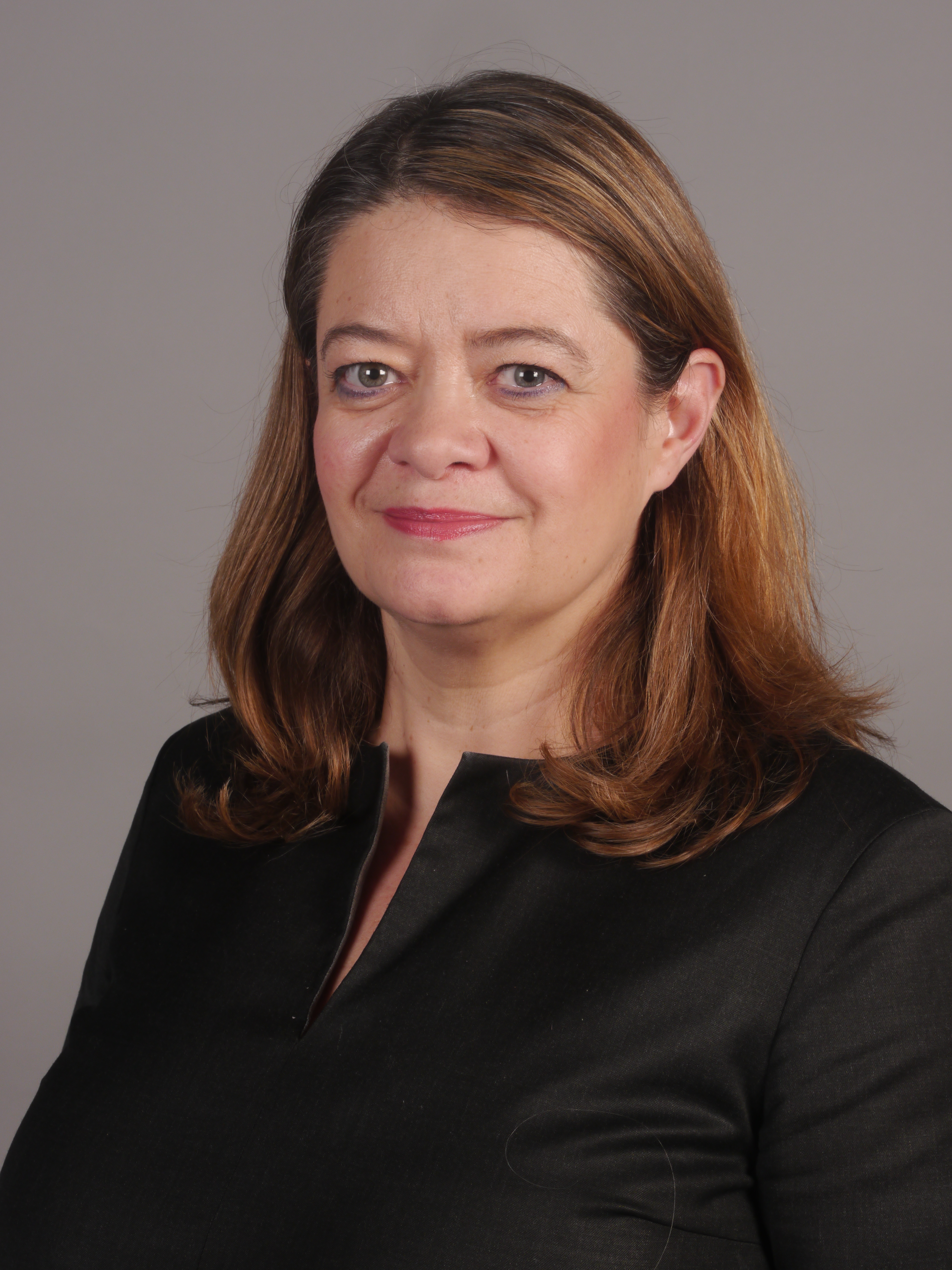

Member of the European Parliament

Personal details
- Born: 26 November 1961 (age 64) Le Blanc-Mesnil, France

Isabelle Thomas (born 26 November 1961) is a French politician. She was a Member of the European Parliament, serving in the eighth term (2014–2019). Previously a member of the Socialist Party, she has been a member of the Génération.s political party since 2017.

Thomas sat on the European Parliament's budgets and fisheries committees.
