= Xabier Benito Ziluaga =

Spanish politician

Xabier Benito Ziluaga MEP
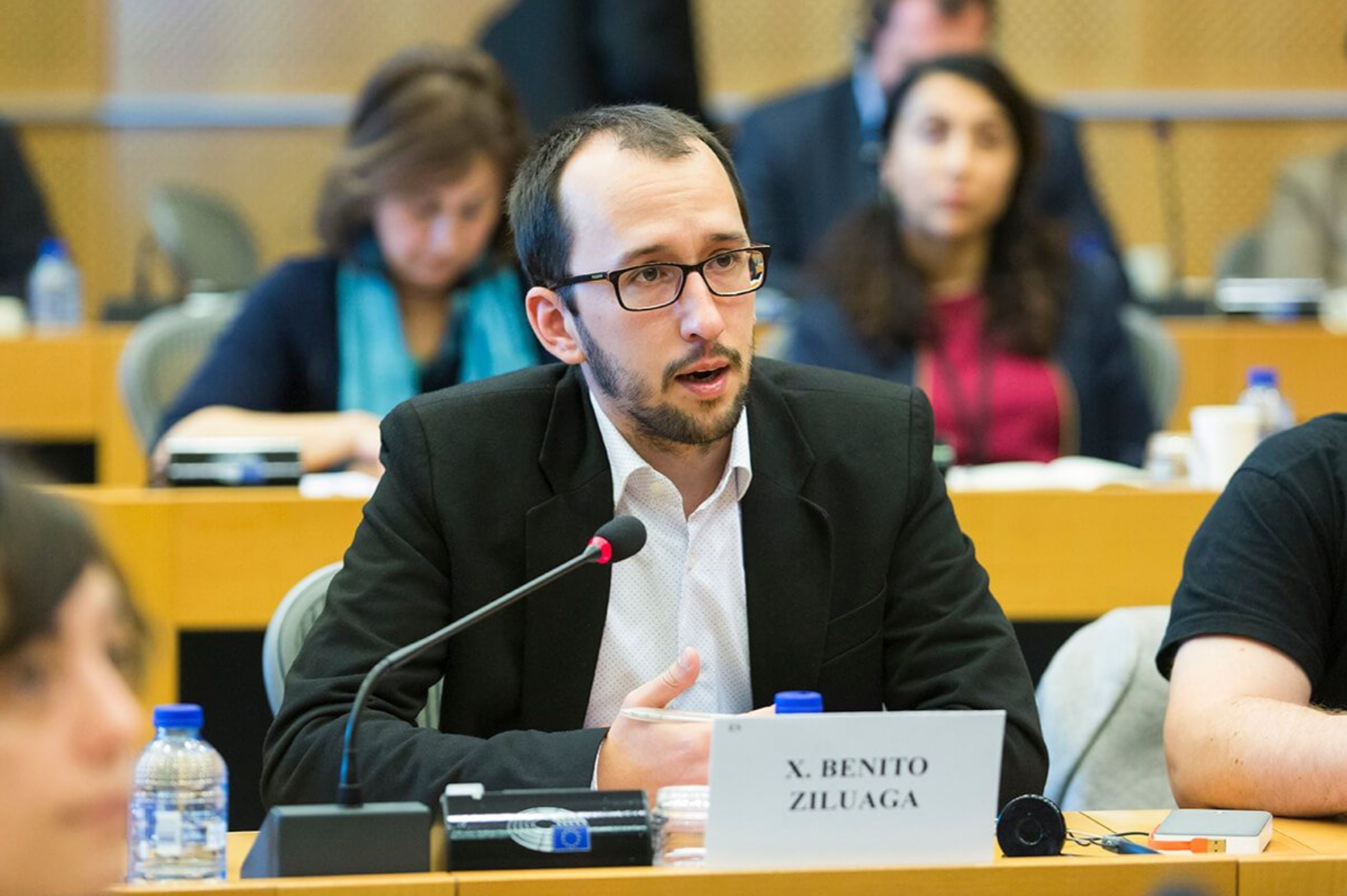

Member of the European Parliament
- Incumbent
- Assumed office 25 November 2015
- Preceded by: Pablo Iglesias Turrión
- Constituency: Spain

Personal details
- Born: 23 May 1988 (age 37) Getxo, Basque Country, Spain
- Party: Podemos
- Occupation: Politician

Xabier Benito Ziluaga, is a Spanish politician, who, since November 2015 has been a Member of the European Parliament, representing Spain as a member of Podemos.

== Biography ==
Xabier Benito was born in Getxo, Basque Country, in 1988. He obtained a Bachelor in Social Works and, before focusing on politics, he developed his professional career working with social excluded people, with special attention to those who suffered drug addictions.

== Political career ==
Benito became a member of the Podemos Urain Ahal Dugu Circulo since its very beginning, in 2014. This local assembly, close to Anti-capitalism ideology, was integrated as a part of the new political party Podemos, which was born in January 2014 as a political reaction to the Spanish anti-austerity movement 15M. The new party presented a national candidacy to the European Parliament election of 2014 after a process of autonomic primary elections in which Benito was placed in the 9th position. Unexpectedly for the media and the rest of political parties, Podemos -born just five months before de election- obtained five seats and became overnight the fourth Spanish political force.

Although Benito didn't enter the European Parliament in the first place, he became a member of the chamber in November 2015, when Pablo Iglesias, leader of the party, resigned and left his seat in Brussels in order to focus in the Spanish General Election 2016. Benito, who was 25 year-old back then, became the youngest member of the European Parliament. In an interview days before becoming a new Member, Benito said he was specially interested in working for "young employment, and a new energy model".

== Parliamentary service ==
- Member, Committee on Industry, Research and Energy
- Vice-chair, Delegation for relations with Mercosur
- Substitute, Delegation for relations with the Federative Republic of Brazil
- Substitute, Committee on Budgets
- Substitute, Delegation to the Euro-Latin American Parliamentary Assembly

== Official website ==
https://xabierbenitoziluaga.info/
