= Claudia Schmidt (politician) =

Austrian politician

Claudia Schmidt (born 26 April 1963) is a politician and educator from Austria who served as Member of 8th European Parliament from 2014 to 2019.

== Personal life ==
Schmidt was born in Salzburg where she also served as Mayor.
