= Ovidiu Sincai Social Democratic Institute =

Non-governmental organization

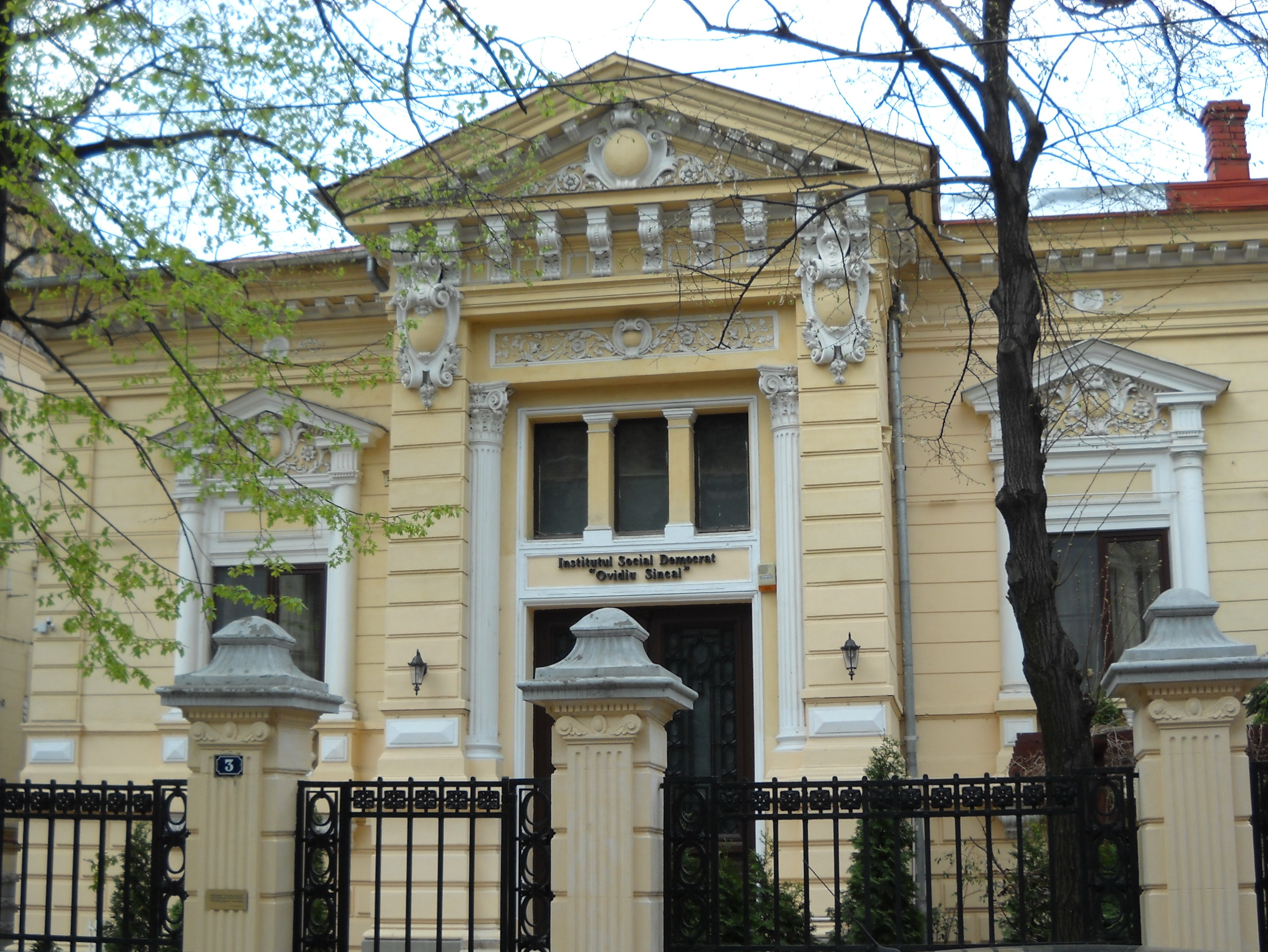
Isd 2011 003

Ovidiu Sincai Social Democratic Institute Foundation is a non-governmental organization from Romania.

The Ovidiu Sincai Social Democratic Institute Foundation received the legal status of non-profit organization of public utility on 4 June 2002. The aim of this foundation is to support the process of doctrinal modernization and has various objectives.

The institute is viewed as one of Social Democratic Party, (Partidul Social Democrat - PSD).

== Objectives ==
Ovidiu Sincai Social Democratic Institute has the following objectives:

- Designing and organizing activities of doctrine and programmatic elaboration;
- Monitoring and professionally analyzing open source information
- Elaborating scientific and political papers and materials;
- Organizing seminars, symposiums, workshops, conferences
- Functioning as a think-tank for governmental institutions and political organizations;
- Organizing activities of education and professional training;
- Cooperating with similar institutes from within the country as well as from abroad;
- Offering scholarships
- Maintaining a documentation center

== Leadership ==
- Adrian Marius Dobre, Secretary General
- Maria Manuela Catrina, Executive Director
- Alexandru Petrescu
- Ionut Pandelica

== Activities, events and actions ==
The Ovidiu Sincai Institute has a prolific research and academic activity, organizing numerous events, round-tables and debates concerning political, social or economical themes, foreign affairs issues or ideology matters.

=== Seminars, conferences and debates ===
Since its foundation, the Ovidiu Sincai Institute organized and hosted various conferences, debates, round tables, covering different issues such as: social-democracy in Romania and in Europe, role of women in politics and in Europe, the EU integration process for Romania and for Eastern Europe countries, the social-democratic party reform process, social-democracy ideology, European security, Romanian foreign affairs, economic growth and sustainable development etc. (check here for a complete list).,

In organizing these events the Ovidiu Sincai Institute collaborated with PES Group of the European Parliament, Friedrich Ebert Foundation, Foundation for European Progressive Studies, the Union of European Federalists, the China Center for World Contemporary Studies among others.

Ovidiu Sincai Institute received special guests such as foreign officials, international organizations officials and foreign ambassadors to Bucharest (HE Philippe Etienne, Ambassador of the France in Romania, HE Eldar Humbat oglu Hasanov, Ambassador of Azerbaijan in Romania, HE Terenyi Janos, former Ambassador of Hungary in Romania, HE Soknan Han Jung, Director of the UN Representation in Romania, HE Markiyan Kulyk, Ambassador of Ukraine in Romania, HE Oleg Malginov, Ambassador of the Russian Federation in Romania).

Among them were Madeleine Albright, former US State Secretary, Ronald Asmus, Co-president of the US NATO Committee, António Guterres, President of the Socialist International, Regis Passerieux, Secretary for International Relations of the French Socialist Party, Herbert Boesch, Vice-president of the Budget Control Commission of the European Parliament, Dominique Strauss-Kahn, Vlad Filat, former prime-minister of Moldova; Erhard Busek, Coordinator of the Stability Pact for South-East Europe, Peter Schieder, President of the Parliamentary Assembly of the Council of Europe, Catherine Lalumiere, former Secretary General of the Council of Europe, Anke Fuchs, Vice-President of the German Bundestag, HE Gerhard Schroeder, Federal Chancellor of Germany (1998-2005).

=== Reports and policy papers ===
The Ovidiu Sincai Institute elaborated and presented a few analysis reports concerning political and social issues,. All these reports were given to Romanian political parties, mass media, other NGOs and to foreign embassies in Bucharest.

The institute also publishes books, political analysis bulletins, policy-briefs, political analysis reports and synthesis. Some of the published books covered the social-democracy issue in Romania and in Europe, others analyzed the Romanian integration process.

== Ovidiu Sincai European School ==
One of the important projects of the institute is the Ovidiu Sincai European School, established on 18 June 2004 in Bucharest, under the aegis of the Council of Europe. Every participant receives a graduation certificate from the Council of Europe at the end of courses.

Each year 30 participants are selected from a wide spectrum of the Romanian society to participate in three national seminars of three-four days, conducted by experienced national and international experts, covering the main aspects of governing a pluralist, democratic and open society. They graduate courses after taking part to the Strasbourg World Forum for Democracy, organized by the Council of Europe in November.

The main objectives are:

- to train future decision-makers, representatives of political parties, of the judiciary, of the administration, journalists, businessmen/women, representatives of civil society in the spirit of democratic and European practices
- to create a proper framework for dialogue and experience-sharing.
