= Liliana Rodrigues =

Portuguese politician

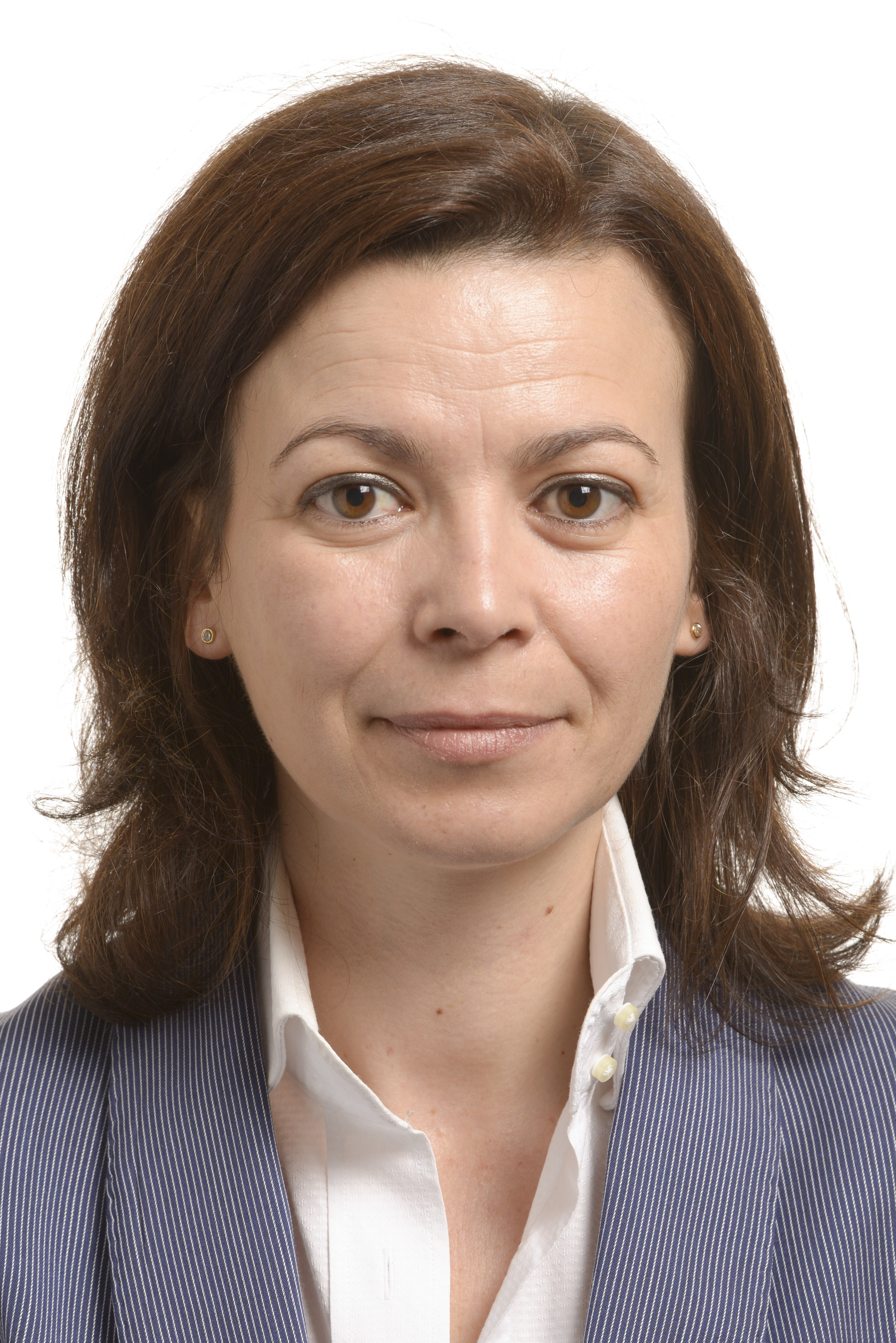
- Official portrait as an MEP, 2014

Member of the European Parliament for Portugal
- Incumbent
- Assumed office 2014—2019

Personal details
- Born: 13 April 1973 (age 53) Santo António, Funchal, Portugal
- Party: Portuguese: Socialist Party; EU: Party of European Socialists

Liliana Maria Gonçalves Rodrigues de Góis (born Santo António, Funchal, 13 April 1973) is a Madeira-born politician of the Socialist Party who served as a Member of the European Parliament, representing Portugal.

== Professional career ==
Prior to her election to the European Parliament, Rodrigues served as the president of the Laboratório de Ideias da Madeira from 2011 until 2015. In her professional life she is a professor at the University of Madeira and an educational investigator. She graduated from the Universidade Nova de Lisboa in 1996 with a degree in philosophy, and received two degrees in education from the University of Madeira, a master's degree in 2003 and a doctorate in 2008. She has taught philosophy, psychology, and sociology at the secondary level as well. She has also traveled to Brazil to teach.

In her spare time Rodrigues enjoys training dogs, a hobby which she says is difficult to pursue in Brussels. She has said that she intends to retain her connections to Madeira while in Parliament.

== Member of the European Parliament, 2014–2019 ==
Rodrigues was first elected to the European Parliament in 2014. In Parliament, she served on the Committee on Regional Development, the Committee on Women's Rights and Gender Equality, the Delegation for relations with the Mashreq countries, and the Delegation to the Parliamentary Assembly of the Union for the Mediterranean. In addition to her committee assignments, she was a member of the European Parliament Intergroup on LGBT Rights.

== Political positions ==
Rodrigues has spoken against austerity measures taken by the government of Portugal.
