= Matthijs van Miltenburg =

Dutch politician

Matthijs van Miltenburg MEP
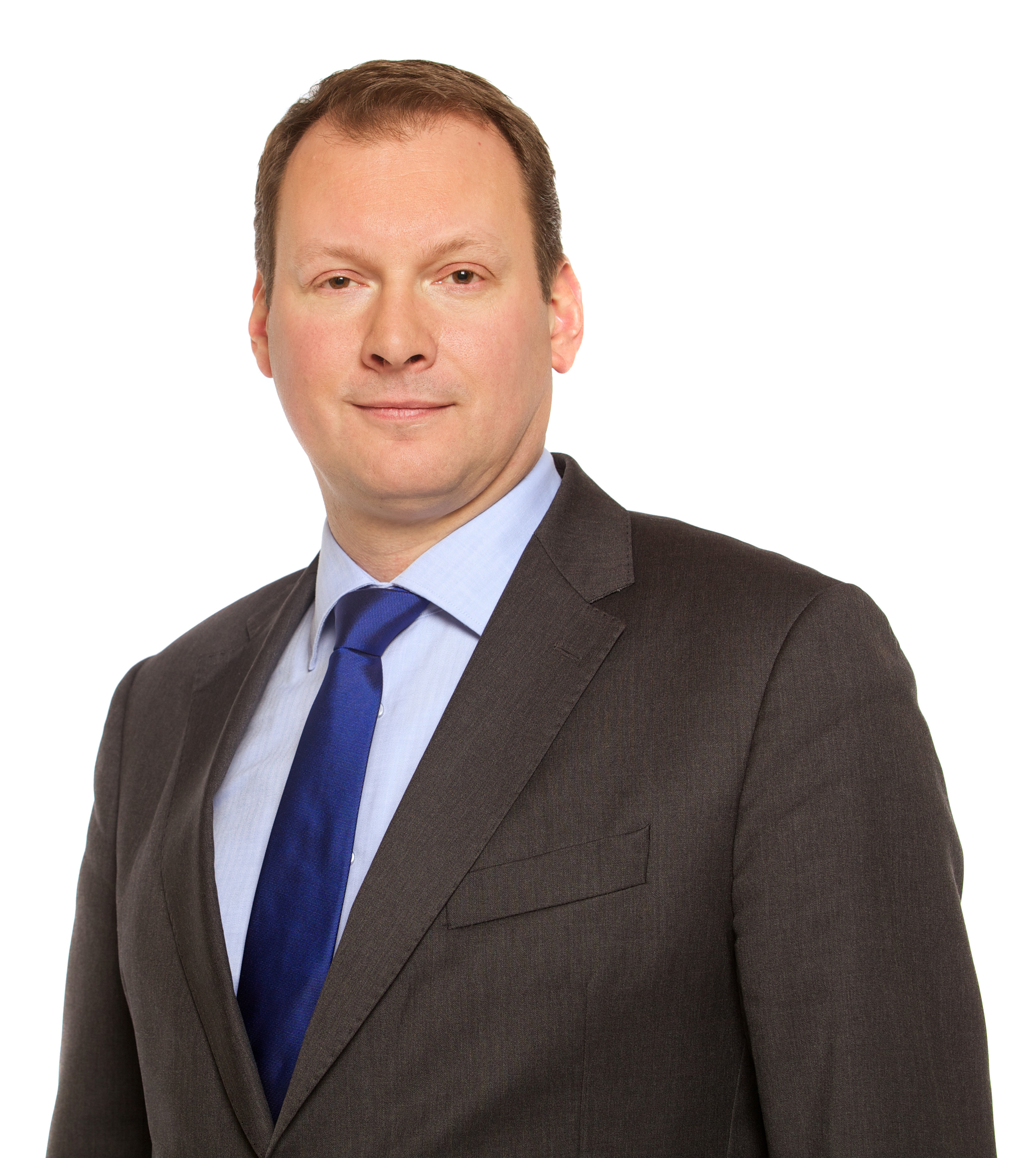

Member of the European Parliament
- In office 1 July 2014 – 1 July 2019
- Constituency: Netherlands

Personal details
- Born: 2 April 1972 (age 54) Rosmalen, Netherlands
- Party: Democrats 66; Alliance of Liberals and Democrats for Europe
- Education: Catholic University of Tilburg
- Website: matthijsvanmiltenburg.eu

Matthijs van Miltenburg (born 2 April 1972) is a Dutch politician who served as Member of the European Parliament (MEP) from 2014 until 2019. He is a member of the Democrats 66.

== Career ==
Van Miltenburg was born on 2 April 1972 in Rosmalen. He studied law and international law at the Catholic University of Tilburg between 1990 and 1996. He followed this up with a study of judicial and administrative science at the same university during the following year.

He worked as a jurist and policy employee for the Ministry of Transport, Public Works and Water Management between 1997 and 2001. Van Miltenburg subsequently worked as a consultant of European funds between 2003 and 2007. He then became a senior policy advisor international affairs for the Dutch province of North Brabant, he stayed in this position until April 2012. At that point he became a projectmanager of foreign investments at a provincial development company.

Van Miltenburg was a member of the municipal council of 's-Hertogenbosch between 11 March 2010 and 24 June 2014.

=== Member of the European Parliament, 2014–2019 ===
In the 2014 European Parliament elections Van Miltenburg was elected for the Democrats 66. Van Miltenburg occupied the fourth place on the party list and he received 16,698 votes.

A member of the ALDE (Group of the Alliance of Liberals and Democrats for Europe) political faction, Van Miltenburg served on the Committee on Regional Development. He was also the ALDE group’s shadow rapporteur for a 2015 European Commission report on regulations for commercial drones.

His term in the European Parliament ended on 1 July 2019.
