= Article 50 (political party) =

Political party in Netherlands

Article 50 Artikel 50
- Founded: 10 December 2012
- Dissolved: 27 January 2015
- Split from: Party for Freedom
- Merged into: For the Netherlands
- Ideology: Euroscepticism
- European affiliation: Movement for a Europe of Liberties and Democracy
- Colours: Orange Purple

Website
- artikel50.nl at the Wayback Machine (archived 2013-04-01)

Article 50 (Dutch: Artikel 50) was a Eurosceptic political party in the Netherlands. The party was founded by MEP Daniël van der Stoep in 2012. The name refers to article 50 of the Lisbon Treaty, of which the first sentence is "Any Member State may decide to withdraw from the Union in accordance with its own constitutional requirements", as well as article 50 of the Constitution of the Netherlands, which states that "[t]he States General shall represent the entire people of the Netherlands." On 27 January 2015, the party merged into For the Netherlands, and therefore Article 50 ceased to exist.

== History ==
Daniël van der Stoep was elected into the European Parliament for the Party for Freedom (PVV) at the 2009 election. He resigned as an MEP on 17 August 2011, having caused a car crash when drunken driving, and was replaced by Auke Zijlstra. He was returned to the European Parliament on 14 December 2011, after the Treaty of Lisbon expanded the Parliament by eighteen MEPs. It was initially disputed Patricia van der Kammen should be elected. However, the PVV did not allow him to rejoin their delegation, and went on as an independent. In November 2012, Van der Stoep founded Article 50 with the intention of participating in the 2014 European Parliament election.

The party participated in several municipalities in the 2014 municipal elections, and won one seat in the municipal council of Weesp, where they promised to write out a referendum concerning the construction of a new mosque. In the 2014 European Parliament election, Article 50 gathered 24,069 votes, not enough for a seat. After the European Parliament election, the party expressed the desire to participate in the 2015 provincial elections and subsequent Senate election.

However, Van der Stoep dissolved the party's national leadership on 23 July 2014, causing the party's councillor in Weesp to split off. Later, Van der Stoep stepped down as party leader. On 27 January 2015, Article 50 merged with the party For the Netherlands, which had been founded by two other former PVV members the year before.

== Electoral results ==
=== European Parliament ===
Election year	# of overall votes	% of overall vote	# of overall seats won	+/–
2014	24,069	0.51 (#12)	0 / 26	
