= Daniël van der Stoep =

Dutch politician (born 1980)

drs Daniël van der Stoep

Member of the European Parliament
- Constituency: Netherlands
- In office 14 July 2009 – 17 August 2011
- In office 1 December 2011 – 1 July 2014

Personal details
- Born: 12 September 1980 (age 46) Delft, Netherlands
- Party: Christian Democratic Appeal (-2006); Party for Freedom (2006–2011); Article 50 (2012–2014)
- Education: Leiden University

Daniël Teunis van der Stoep (born 12 September 1980, Delft) is a Dutch politician who was a Member of the European Parliament (MEP) during two periods from July 2009 to August 2011 and from December 2011 to July 2014.

== Career ==
He was elected to the European Parliament for the Party for Freedom (PVV) at the 2009 election. He resigned as an MEP on 17 August 2011, having caused a car crash when drunken driving, and was replaced by Auke Zijlstra. He returned to the European Parliament on 14 December 2011, after the Treaty of Lisbon expanded the Parliament by eighteen MEPs. It was initially disputed Patricia van der Kammen should be elected. However, the PVV did not allow him to rejoin their delegation, and went on as an independent. In 2012, Van der Stoep founded his own party, Article 50, with the intention of participating in the 2014 European Parliament election. The name refers to Article 50 of the Treaty on European Union, of which the first sentence is "Any Member State may decide to withdraw from the Union in accordance with its own constitutional requirements." In the 2014 European Parliament elections the party did not earn a seat; it was merged with For the Netherlands after Van der Stoep's departure.

=== Salary ===
Daniël van der Stoep has been very public in regards to his salary and expenditures granted by the European Parliament. In a European Union documentary by Peter Vlemmix, he has reported his monthly salary to be 8000 Euros plus the allowance to request 300 euros daily without the need of explaining, other forms of benefits and expenditures are also included. In another YouTube video featuring Van der Stoep, he has explained and demonstrated the luxury and the expenses he and the other members of parliament enjoy. He has told that he would be willing to get a lower salary but has not undertook any measures to reject the benefits entitled to him by the European parliament, neither it looks like he presented any proposition in front of the parliament to pass any law demanding reducing EU members of parliament benefits.

== Conviction ==
On November 11, 2015, the Public Prosecutor's Office confirmed that Van der Stoep was suspected of at least three attempts at fornication with underage girls in the period from 2012 to early 2014. He allegedly offered money, cocaine, cigarettes, drinks, hotel stays and holidays, among other things, abusing his status as a Member of the European Parliament. On 24 November 2015, the Public Prosecution Service demanded five months' imprisonment (three of which was conditional) and a 240-hour community sentence before the court in The Hague. On December 8, Van der Stoep was sentenced in accordance with the requirement. In August 2018, on appeal, the unconditional prison sentence was converted into 3 months probation.
