= Paul Tang (politician) =

Dutch politician (born 1967)

Paul Tang MEP
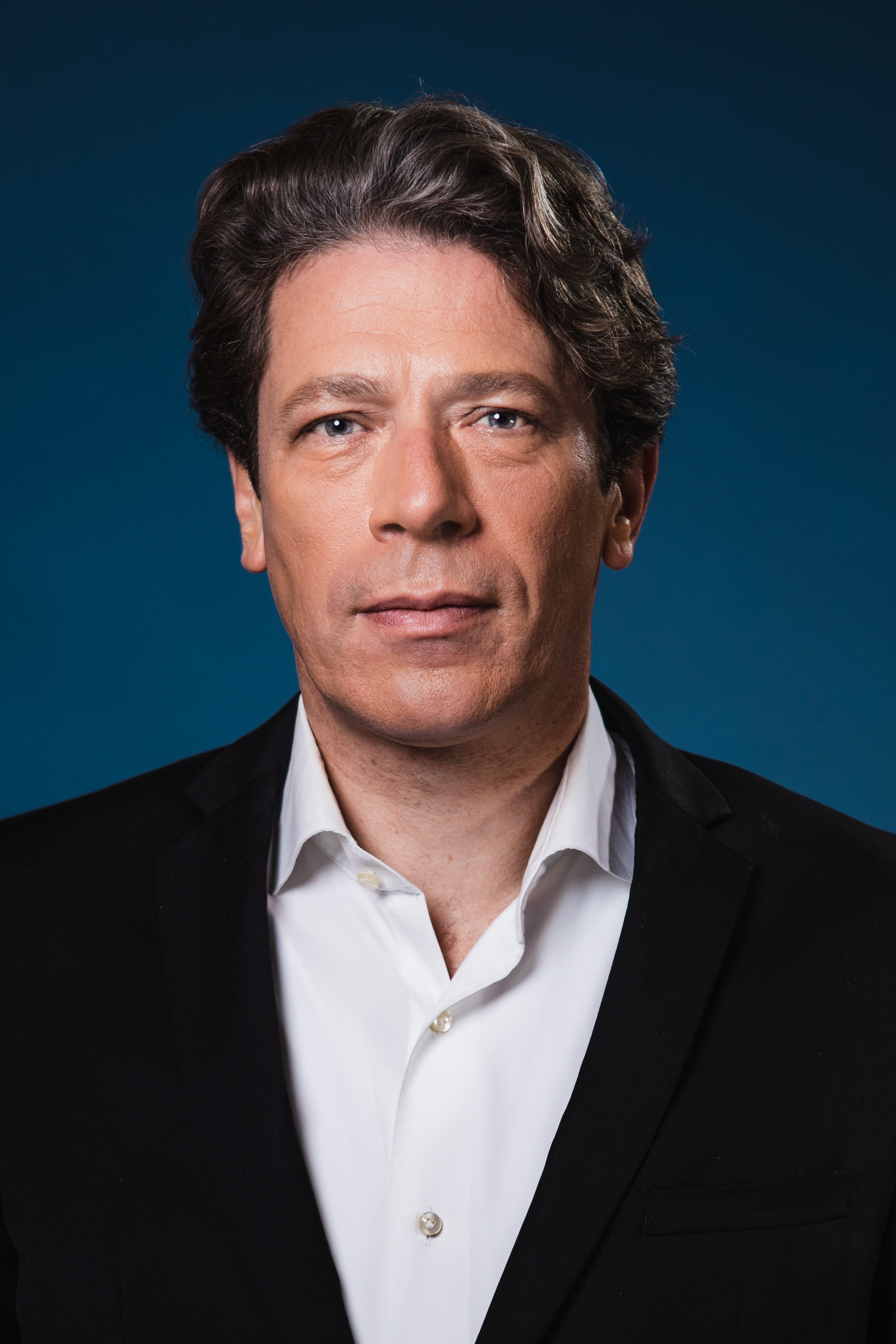
- Paul Tang in 2020

Member of the European Parliament
- In office 1 July 2014 – 15 July 2024
- Constituency: Netherlands

Member of the House of Representatives of the Netherlands
- In office 1 March 2007 – 17 June 2010

Personal details
- Born: Paul Johannes George Tang; 23 April 1967 (age 59) Haarlem, Netherlands
- Party: Labour Party; Progressive Alliance of Socialists and Democrats
- Children: 2
- Education: University of Amsterdam
- Website: paultang.nl

Paul Johannes George (Paul) Tang (Haarlem, 23 April 1967) is a Dutch economist and politician on behalf of the Dutch Labour Party.

== Early life ==
Paul Johannes George Tang was born on 23 April 1967 in Haarlem in the Netherlands, and he was raised in Alkmaar. His father worked for the water authority, while his mother worked as an accountant.

== Education ==
Paul Tang grew up in Alkmaar, the Netherlands. He studied economics at the University of Amsterdam (UvA), where he graduated cum laude in 1991. He then worked as an assistant-in-training at the Katholieke Universiteit Brabant and as a researcher-in-training at the UvA. From 1995 to 2005, Tang worked at the Central Planning Bureau. Here he worked, among other things, on "Four futures of Europe,"[1] an analysis of the challenges facing the European Union and its member states.

In September 2005, he joined the Ministry of Economic Affairs, as deputy director of the Directorate of General Economic Policy. Tang had earned a doctorate in Economic Sciences in 2000 for his dissertation on endogenous growth theory; one of his promoters was politician Rick van der Ploeg. He wrote several scholarly articles on economic topics.

== Political career ==
In the 2006 national parliament elections, Tang was 35th on the PvdA's candidate list, too low to be directly elected. As a number of MPs from his party joined the Balkenende IV cabinet, Tang was still installed as an MP on 1 March 2007.

Tang held his maiden speech on 11 April 2007 at the ‘spoeddebat’ (emergency debate) on excessive remuneration. He continued to pursue this issue with proposals such as an environmental bonus for the Schiphol top, the claw-back of unintended bonuses, freezing rewards in mergers and acquisitions. Out of anger over the bonus policy at ING, he cancelled his account at the bank. In mid-2007, he succeeded Ferd Crone as financial and fiscal spokesman for the PvdA party and led during the 2008 financial crisis.

On 14 September 2009, it was revealed that Tang had leaked the Macro-Economic Outlook for 2010 to RTL Nieuws, due to an error by RTL.[2] From whom the ‘Miljoenennota’ (national annual budget) originated remained unknown. He was not allowed to speak in his policy area for a month. In 2008, Tang also discussed the contents of the then secret ‘Miljoenennota’ on the radio together with Agnes Kant and Frans Weekers.[3]

On 16 April 2010 Tang announced that he would not run for re-election to the House of Representatives,[4]. While Tang left the political arena, he remained in the public sphere through his column in the ‘Groene Amsterdammer’. He also worked as a self-employed Consultant. He was the initiator of the Taskforce Verzilveren,[5] which was an initiative to look at how people can cash in the surplus value of their own home if their income or pension is insufficient.

=== European Parliament ===
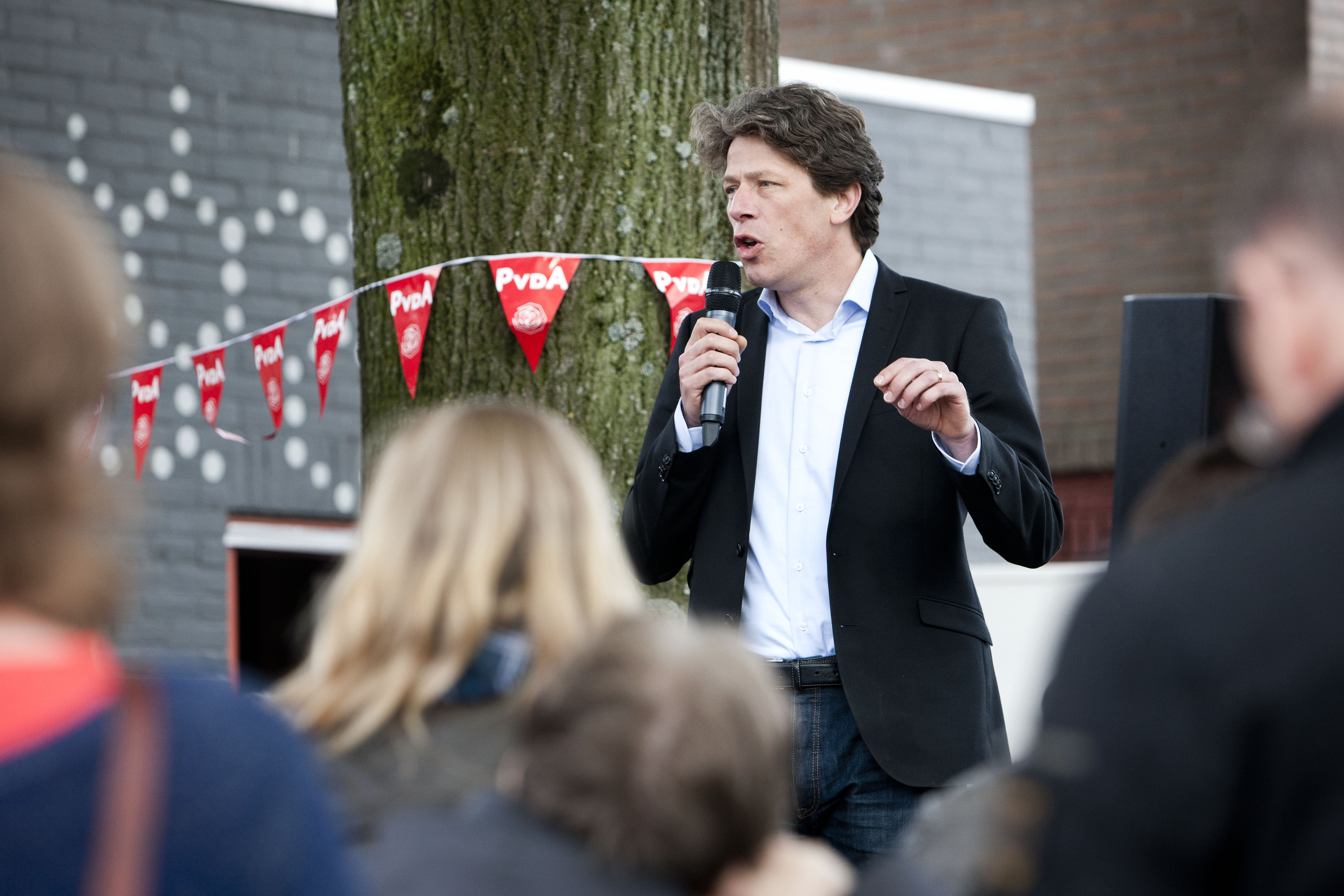
Paul Tang campaigning in 2014

First mandate European Parliament

For the 2014 European Parliament elections, Tang had been chosen as the list leader on behalf of the Labour Party, with 52% of the vote in the first round. He called for an unemployment standard as a counterpart to a budget standard.[6] In the elections, the Labour Party retained its three seats. On 1 July 2014 Tang became a member of the European Parliaments 8th parliamentary term. During this term Tang was the leader of the PvdA delegation, in the S&D group.

Tang became a member of the Economic and Monetary Affairs (ECON), Budget (BUDG) and substitute member of the Industry, Research and Energy (ITRE) Committee. In February 2015, the European Parliament established a special committee [7] on tax agreements between member states and multinational corporations (TAXE), where Tang served as a member. This committee was set up in response to the LuxLeaks revelations that revealed that Luxembourg gave huge tax breaks to multinationals, the committee put forward a list of recommendations to tackle tax avoidance by multinational companies in the EU. Tang also served as a Member is the consecutive Special Committee TAXE2 and TAX3, which focused on increasing transparency and cooperation between governments and between national parliaments in the field of taxation and on new tax evasion and avoidance issues. Following the Panama Papers revelations about tax avoidance and evasion by corporations, criminals and wealthy individuals, a commission of inquiry was established in July 2016 named PANA Committee of Inquiry. TAXE, TAXE2, TAX3 and PANA served as the basis for what later would become the FISC committee, of which Tang became chair.

In December 2015, Paul Tang became responsible for the new legislation on Simple Transparent and Standardized (STS) securitization on behalf of the European Parliament. As rapporteur for the European Parliament, he informed Commissioner Hill in March that he did not want to act hastily.[8] Securitization was one of the causes of the financial crisis in 2008. This formed the reason for Tang's report to place a heavier emphasis on supervision and require more transparency on loans being resold. Banks and financial institutions were eager for the European Parliament to rush the new legislation and were therefore not happy with Tang's stance.

On 24 November 2016 Paul Tang was appointed rapporteur on the directive for a European Common Corporate Tax Base (CCTB). This proposal provides for the harmonization of profit taxes for multinationals in the EU and will mean that profit taxes for large international companies will be calculated in a uniform way across the European Union. The aim is to make tax avoidance more difficult while creating greater clarity for multinationals on the profit tax payable in different EU member states. The common base is attached to a second bill that proposes to consolidate and allocate profits tax within the EU to member states, called CCCTB. Collectively, these two directives will ensure that large companies can no longer shift their profits to member states with the most advantageous tax regime, and will also eliminate unfair competition from multinational companies vis-à-vis SMEs that do pay profit tax in the country where they operate.

In December 2017, while dealing with the Panama Papers, Tang filed an amendment that added to a list of external tax havens five internal ones: Luxembourg, Malta, Cyprus, Ireland and the Netherlands. The vote stalled at 327 to 327, due to a supporter mistakenly voting against it.[9] On another occasion, in March 2019, Tang still managed to pass the amendment through parliament.[10]

In September, Tang was closely involved in the European Parliament's position on the EU Action Plan on Sustainable Finance, which served as a corner stone for the sustainable finance agenda. Furthermore, as rapporteur in 2019, he played a central role in the negotiations regarding the Sustainable Finance Disclosure Regulation (SFDR) regulation. This regulations put forward an transparency framework on sustainability-related disclosers in the financial sector, which allows investors to assess sustainability risks.

In December 2018, Tang was rapporteur from the Economic Affairs Committee on the proposal for a Digital Services Tax. His report was adopted by an overwhelming majority.[11] In March 2019, the Economic and Financial Affairs Council blocked the proposal, pending negotiations at the OECD level.[12] Following the blockade, Tang presented an initiative bill for a Dutch Digital Services Tax in the Dutch National Parliament with Member of Parliament Henk Nijboer in April 2019.[13]

Second mandate European Parliament For the 2019 European Parliament elections, Tang was third on the candidate list of the PvdA. On 23 May 2019 the party doubled in size, after an overwhelming election result. with 6 of the 26 Dutch seats the PvdA became the biggest Dutch Party. The PvdA ‘Spitzenkandidat’ Frans Timmermans became Eurocommissioner. Tang took a seat on the Economic and Monetary Affairs Committee (ECON). He also became a substitute member of the Civil Liberties, Internal Affairs and Justice (LIBE) committee.

During his second term, Tang continued his extensive work on sustainable finance. He was shadow rapporteur on the EU Taxonomy proposal which, as part of the aforementioned EU Action Plan on Sustainable Finance, sets European uniform criteria to determine whether investments are sustainable. Furthermore, he was rapporteur on European Green Bond Standard. Among other things, he emphasized independent audits and transition plans, which enable financing of sustainable activities over time.

On digital policy, Tang was the only Dutch negotiator involved in the Digital Services Act (DSA), the law that aims to make online services more secure and reliable. Experts suspected in advance that this would become the most lobbied law worldwide.[14][15][16][17] On behalf of the European Parliament, Tang was one of the rapporteurs on the DSA initiative report in 2020 and, as the initiator of the European Tracking-free Ads Coalition - a coalition of politicians, NGOs and companies formed to ban tracking ads on the Internet - filed several successful amendments against tracking and targeting. In the final legal text, this led to a ban on profiling through processing of special personal data and minors. The agreement on the DSA was dealt with in parallel with the consideration of the sister law DMA (Digital Markets Act), in which Tang was also involved as a negotiator. This law focuses on limiting market power of the Big Tech.

Thus, he advocated interoperability to get more choice for users and less power for the tech companies. Following the DSA, Tang initiated amendments to the Political Ads Regulation again with the Tracking-free Ads Coalition. As shadow rapporteur on the Judiciary Committee (LIBE), Tang helped negotiate this law.[18]

In addition, Tang worked on the controversial law to curb online child grooming and the distribution of child pornography. His effort to remove mass scanning of all, encrypted and unencrypted communications from the law was adopted by a large majority of the European Parliament.[source?] Within the Justice Committee (LIBE), Tang also worked on legislation in the field of data exchange between police forces (Prum II) and between Passenger Information Units and airlines (Advanced Passenger Information) to combat terrorism and cross-border crime. Tang successfully proposed several measures in the negotiations that better protect fundamental rights of citizens.[19]

At his urging, following the TAXE, TAXE2, TAX3 and PANA committees, the Subcommittee on Taxation (FISC) was established in September 2020 for which Tang was elected chairman . This subcommittee of the Economic and Monetary Affairs Committee was set up to assist in tax-related legislation, and focuses on combating tax avoidance and tax evasion. The FISC subcommittee is the only public platform where European and international tax legislation is publicly discussed and scrutinized.

Under Tang's chairmanship, the FISC committee began a Tax Tour. Its purpose was to exchange knowledge between the European Parliament, national parliaments and civil society. This took subcommittee delegations past Ireland, Luxembourg, the Netherlands, Switzerland, the United Kingdom and Singapore[20], France and the United States. In some countries, the need for change is not felt as strongly as in others. As a result, the problem persists. Tax Tour is gathering insight on the bottlenecks in tackling tax avoidance and holding countries accountable for their responsibility to combat tax avoidance.

In addition to the Tax tour, Tang organized the Tax symposium together with the European Commission. This two-day European tax conference aimed to discuss the future of taxation in Europe. During this symposium, delegates from the IMF and the OECD, Ministers and politicians from various European countries, Euro Commissioners and parliamentarians as well as academics and business representatives spoke.

Following is the tackling of money laundering. Tang is the co-rapporteur for the 6th Money Laundering Directive (AMLD) and also involved in the establishment of the European Anti-Money Laundering Authority (AMLA). Efforts include improving and broadening information on who has what assets where

As a member of the ECON Committee, Tang is also involved in legislation on investment funds AIFMD with the goal of better protecting investor from opaque structures. Tang is also responsible for negotiating legislation on the Digital Euro on behalf of the European Social Democrats.

Paul Tang made an early announcement not to run for a third term in the European Parliament. Since 30 May 2024 he is executive cabinet member and first deputy mayor of the city Almere with the portfolio of Housing, Spatial Development and Sport. His term as MEP ended on 15 July 2024.

== Personal life ==
Tang is married to Victoria, whom he met in secondary school, and they have two sons. As of 2024, Tang was living in Amsterdam. He is a supporter of the football club AZ Alkmaar He had to quit as chairman of the soccer club SDZ after he won the campaign for list leader.
