= Auke Zijlstra =

Dutch politician (born 1964)

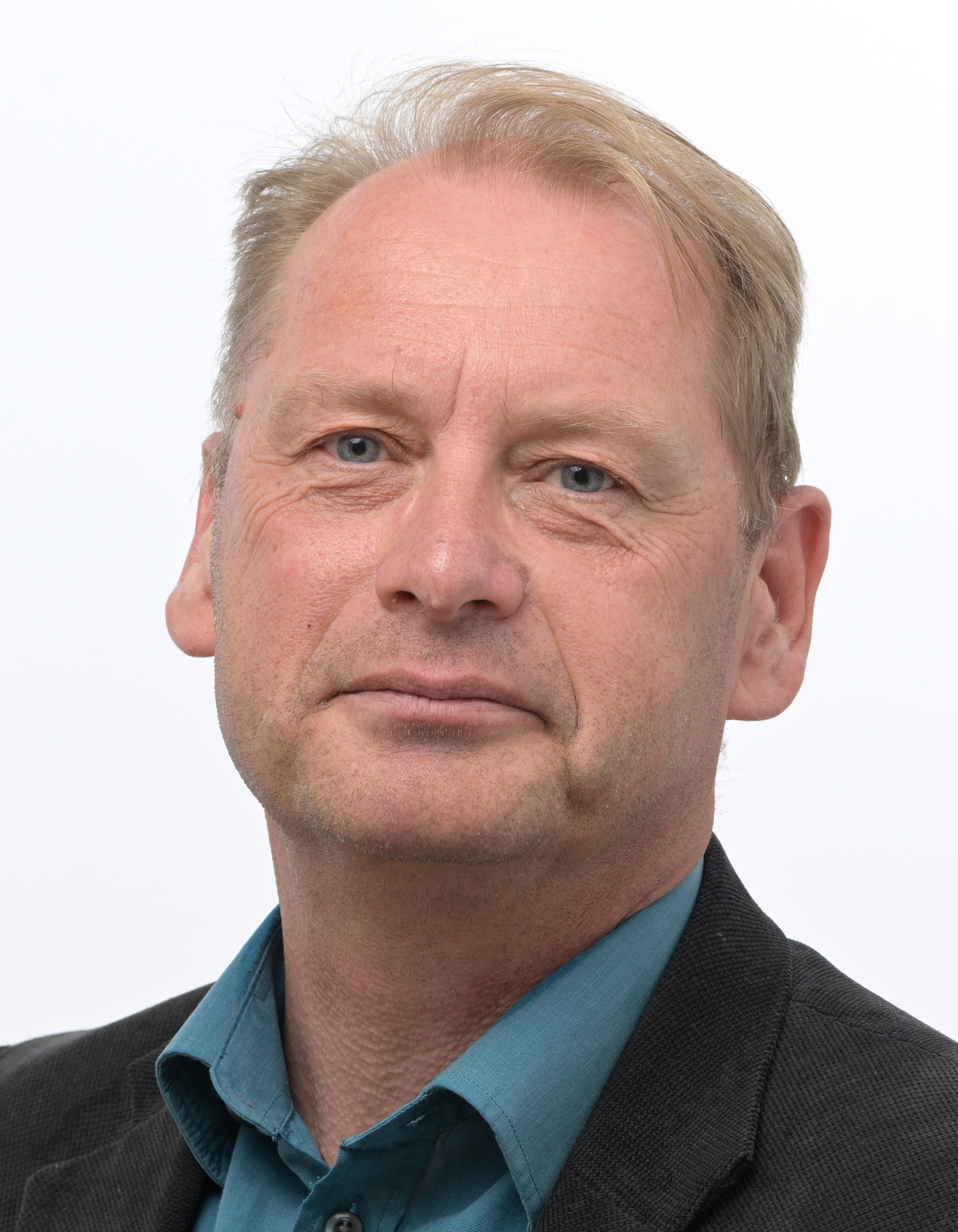
- Official portrait, 2024

Member of the European Parliament for the Netherlands
- Incumbent
- Assumed office 16 July 2024
- Parliamentary group: Patriots for Europe
- In office 7 September 2015 – 1 July 2019
- In office 13 September 2011 – 30 June 2014

Personal details
- Born: 1 November 1964 (age 61) Joure, Netherlands
- Party: PVV (2006–present)
- Other political affiliations: VVD (until 2006)
- Education: University of Groningen

Auke Zijlstra (born 1 November 1964) is a Dutch politician. He has been a member of the European Parliament (MEP) for the Party for Freedom (PVV) since July 2024. He previously served on the body from 13 September 2011 to 1 July 2014 and once more from 7 September 2015 until 2 July 2019.

== Early life and career ==
Zijlstra was born on 1 November 1964 in Joure. He studied economy at the University of Groningen from 1984 to 1992.

Zijlstra then started working as a projectmanager in the ICT department of British American Tobacco from 1991 to 2002. From 2003 to 2010 he worked for the Ministry of the Interior and Kingdom Relations.

== Political career ==
Zijlstra was on the sixth position of the candidate list of the Party for Freedom at the 2009 European Parliament election. As the Party for Freedom won four seats, he was not elected. He went on to serve as a parliamentary aide to the Party for Freedom group in the European Parliament from September 2010 onwards. On 13 September 2011 he replaced Daniël van der Stoep, who gave his seat back to the Party for Freedom after being involved in a drunk driving incident in August 2011.

Zijlstra is known for his pro-Israel views. He sees the Israeli–Palestinian conflict as a conflict in which the world denies that for the Arab side it is a conflict of religion rather than territory. He sees no solution for peace before this world opinion is changed.

In March 2012 the Party for Freedom launched a website on which Dutch citizens could complain of inconveniences caused by migrant workers from Central and Eastern Europe. Zijlstra defended the speech in the European Parliament, citing that the party listens to the complaints by the population. He furthermore claimed that crime levels had risen in the Netherlands since the addition of new member states in 2004. He blamed the "Brussels elite" of "importing criminality from Eastern Europe". The speech and the website received severe criticism from other MEPs. In a vote on the website the European Parliament with a large majority said that the website was discriminatory and malicious.

His term ended on 1 July 2014. Zijlstra had been member, amongst others, of the Committee on Civil Liberties, Justice and Home Affairs and the Delegation for relations with the Palestinian Legislative Council. For the 2014 European Parliament elections he was fifth on the Party for Freedom list, the party won four seats and Zijlstra was thus not elected. He then became an employee for the Party for Freedom delegation the European Parliament.

Zijlstra joined the European Parliament again in September 2015, after the death of Hans Jansen. Zijlstra stated, that for a Eurospectic party like the Party for Freedom it was best to impede the decision-making process. For the European Parliament elections of 2019 Zijlstra was third on the Party for Freedom list. He was not elected and his membership of the European Parliament ended on 2 July 2019. He ran for the office again in June 2024 as the PVV's third candidate. The party won six seats, and Zijlstra was sworn in on 16 July.

== Electoral history ==
Electoral history of Auke Zijlstra
| Year | Body | Party | Pos. | Votes | Result | | Ref. |
| Year | Body | Party | Pos. | Votes | Party seats | Individual | Ref. |
|---|---|---|---|---|---|---|---|
| 2006 | House of Representatives | Party for Freedom | 11 | 540 | 9 | Lost | |
| 2010 | House of Representatives | Party for Freedom | 26 | 335 | 24 | Lost | |
| 2024 | European Parliament | Party for Freedom | 3 | 24,318 | 6 | Won | |
