= Louis Bontes =

Dutch politician and police officer

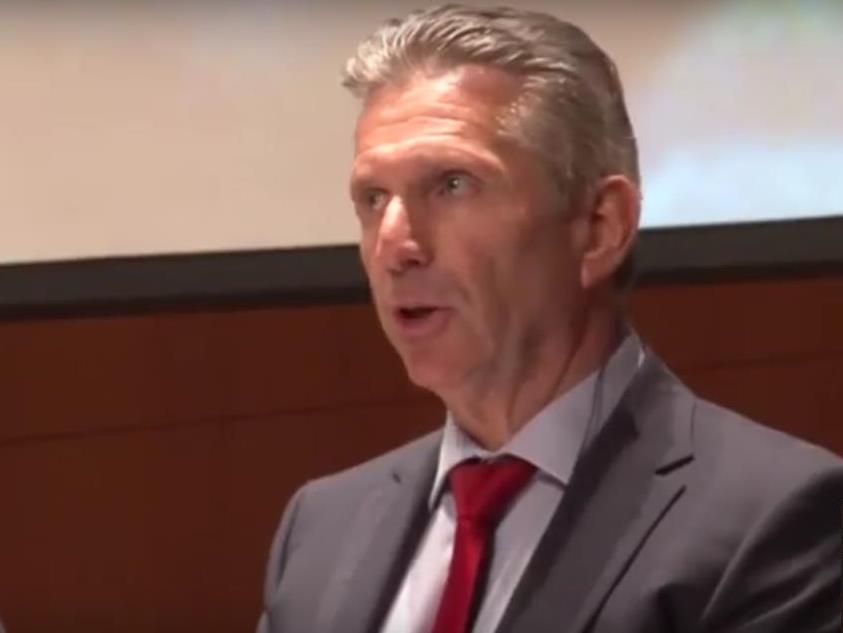

Member of the House of Representatives
- In office 17 June 2010 – 23 March 2017

Member of the European Parliament for the Netherlands
- In office 14 July 2009 – 17 June 2010

Personal details
- Born: 28 February 1956 (age 70) Rotterdam, Netherlands
- Party: VNL (2014–2015)
- Other political affiliations: PVV (2009–2013)
- Education: The Hague University of Applied Science; Utrecht University
- Occupation: Police officer Politician
- Website: (in Dutch) Party for Freedom website

Louis Bontes (Dutch pronunciation: [luˈʋi ˈbɔntəs]; born 28 February 1956) is a Dutch politician and former police officer. He was a member of the European Parliament (2009–2010) and a member of the House of Representatives of the Netherlands (2010–2017) for the Party for Freedom (PVV) until 2013 and as an independent since. He was the cofounder and chairman of the political party For the Netherlands (VNL) from 2014 to 2015.

== Early life and career ==
Louis Bontes was born on 28 February 1956 in Rotterdam in the Netherlands.

He worked many years in the Dutch police force, towards the end as district commander harbor for the Rotterdam-Rijnmond area.

== Politics ==
Bontes represented the Party for Freedom (PVV) until 2013, and focused on matters of the European Union, civil law, security, police and foreign policy (Africa, Middle and South America). From 2009 to 2010, he was an MEP for the PVV. In October 2013, after Bontes talked to the media about his being disappointed with the methods of the PVV, the party's parliamentary group expelled him.

Bontes remained in parliament as an independent, and stated he would keep voting along with the PVV. In May 2014, Bontes founded the political party For the Netherlands (VNL) with other former PVV members Joram van Klaveren, and Johan Driessen. Bontes stepped down as chairman of VNL, after Bram Moszkowicz was selected to become lijsttrekker in the next elections.

Bontes has been banned from entry to Russia since 2015.

His term in the House ended on 23 March 2017.
