= Johan Driessen =

Dutch politician and former lawyer

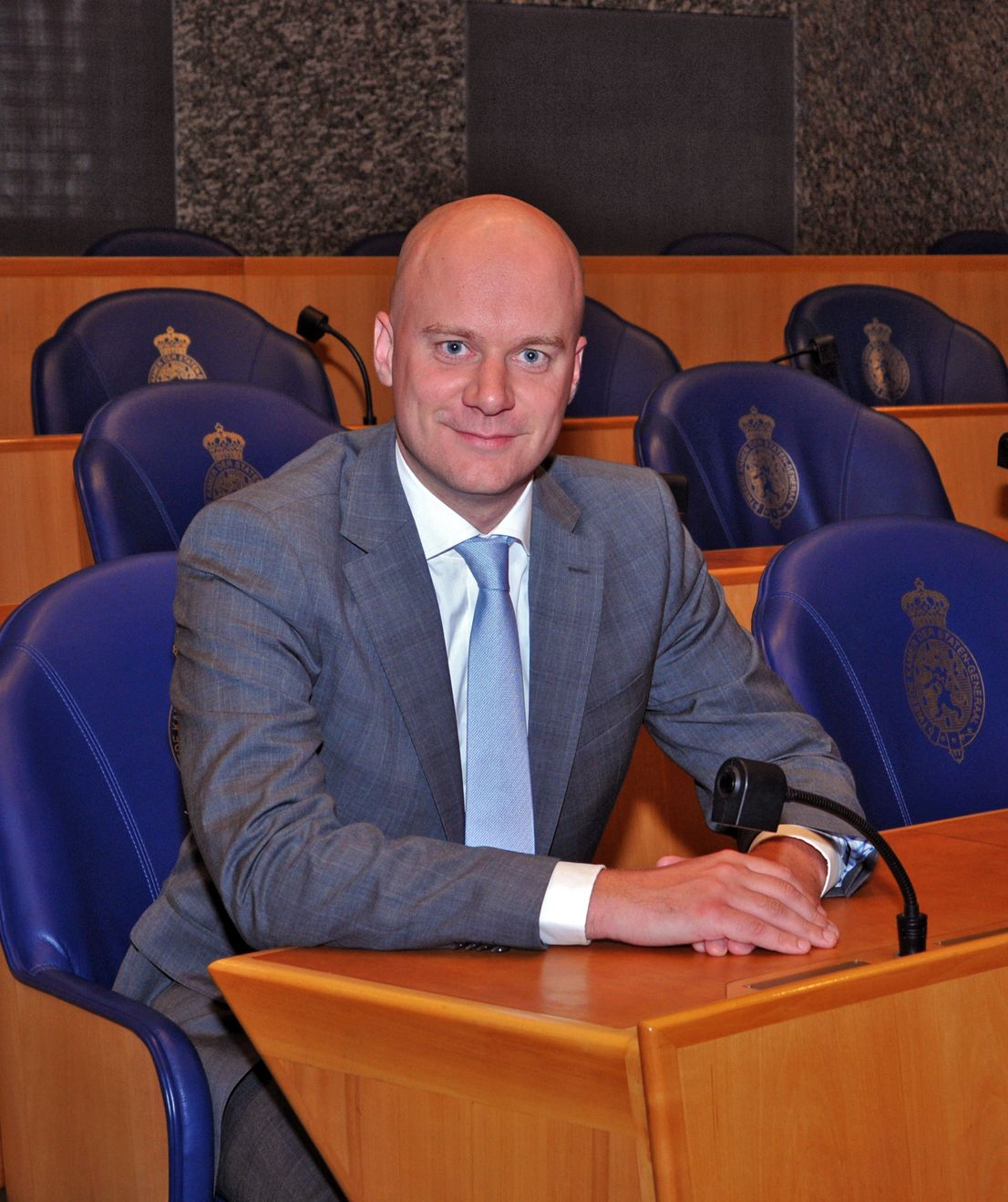
Johan Driessen

Johannes Henricus Antonius (Johan) Driessen (born 4 June 1981 in Cuijk en Sint Agatha) is a Dutch politician and former lawyer. He was an MP for the Party for Freedom (PVV) from 17 June 2010 to 19 September 2012. He focused on matters of development aid.

In late 2013, Driessen joined the independent MP Louis Bontes who had been expelled from the PVV. Together with Joram van Klaveren, who had also left the PVV, Bontes later formed a new group in the House of Representatives. In 2014, the three founded a new party called For the Netherlands (VNL), of which Driessen became the treasurer.
