= Joram van Klaveren =

Dutch politician (born 1979)

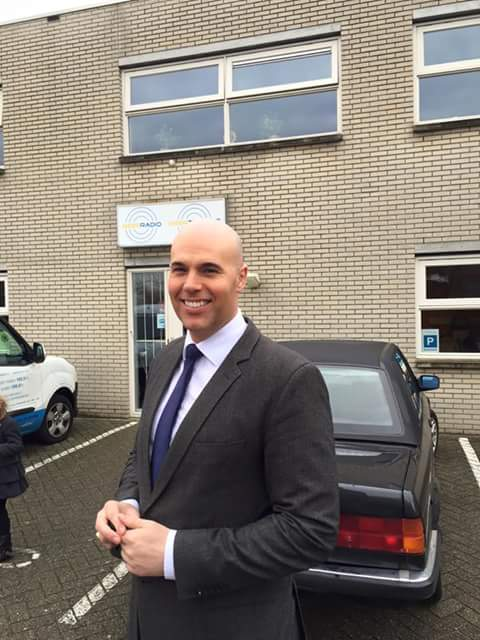

Member of the House of Representatives
- In office 17 June 2010 – 23 March 2017

Member of the States-Provincial of Flevoland
- In office 24 March 2011 – 11 June 2014

Personal details
- Born: Joram Jaron van Klaveren; 23 January 1979 (age 47) Amsterdam, Netherlands
- Party: Party for Freedom (until 2014)
- Education: Vrije Universiteit Amsterdam
- Occupation: Politician

Joram Jaron van Klaveren (born 23 January 1979) is a Dutch politician. As a member of the Party for Freedom he was an MP from 17 June 2010 until 21 March 2014. He subsequently was an independent until his term in office ended on 23 March 2017. He focused on matters of desegregation, employment-to-population ratio, egalitarianism and emancipation. From 24 March 2011 until 11 June 2014, he also was a member of the States-Provincial of Flevoland. He became well known for anti-Muslim comments. In October 2018, he converted to Islam halfway through writing an anti-Islam book. After becoming a Muslim, he decided to rededicate his book to his search for religiosity and the subsequent conversion to Islam. His book titled Apostate: From Christianity to Islam in Times of Secularisation and Terror was published in both Dutch and English.

== Biography ==
Van Klaveren was born on 23 January 1979 in Amsterdam. He was raised as a Reformed Liberated Christian, studied religious studies at VU University Amsterdam and has worked as an educator.

From March 2006 to June 2009, he was a member of the municipal council of Almere on behalf of the People's Party for Freedom and Democracy. In the 2010 general election, he was elected into the House of Representatives on behalf of the Party for Freedom. He has also been a member of the States of Flevoland since the 2011 provincial elections.

In 2009, van Klaveren was convicted for driving under the influence and refusing a sobriety test.

On 21 March 2014, van Klaveren announced that he would leave the Party for Freedom, as he no longer agreed with the party's course. Controversial comments on the Moroccan minority in the Netherlands by party leader Geert Wilders after the 2014 local elections played part in this decision. Van Klaveren continued as an independent MP. In May 2014, Joram van Klaveren, together with Louis Bontes and Johan Driessen, founded a new conservative political party called For the Netherlands (VNL).

After failing to get reelected during the 2017 general election because VNL did not secure a single seat, van Klaveren's term in the House formally ended on 23 March 2017. Subsequently, he became a commentator in April 2017 for the daily radio show Dit is de Dag, produced by Christian public broadcaster EO. According to presenter Tijs van den Brink, he was hired because he represented conservative and right-wing Christians.

== Conversion to Islam ==
At 40-years-old, he has said he became a Muslim after writing an anti-Islamic book. Van Klaveren was known for anti-Islamic comments: he spoke of "Muslim misery". In 2019, in interviews on the occasion of his publishing De afvallige ('The Renegade'), which chronicles his search for religion and religiosity, he mentioned that he now accepts Muhammad as a prophet, and said that he had converted to Islam.

Van Klaveren is not the first high-profile PVV member to convert to Islam. He follows in the footsteps of Arnoud van Doorn, a former Hague-based PVV city councillor who converted in 2013.

His former political leader Wilders (PVV) said he had never seen van Klaveren's conversion coming, adding that if van Klaveren had still been with the PVV, he would have had to leave immediately. His erstwhile VNL leader Jan Roos added he was equally startled: "Does this flip surprise me? Yes, totally."

Said Bouharrou, who serves on the Board of Moroccan Mosques in the Netherlands praised his conversion and said that it was brave that he was prepared to do it in public.

== Book ==
In his book, Apostate: From Christianity to Islam in Times of Secularisation and Terror, van Klaveren talked about his testimony of faith:

"With the idea in mind that one God Whom Moses and Jesus, amongst others, spoke about is the same as the God that we read about in the Quran, and that Muhammad, may Allah bless him and grant him peace, without any doubts fits the line of prophets from the Bible, I decided to pronounce the testimony of faith. This took place after an excellent dinner in a cozy, homely setting with a small group of people. After pronouncing the Shahada, it did not rain gold and did not see the stars sparkle more than usual. However, I did notice a certain personal delight and rest."
