= VoorNederland =

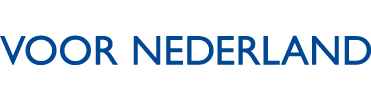
- Abbreviation: VNL
- Leader: Jan Roos
- Chairman: Laurence Stassen
- Secretary: Joram van Klaveren
- Treasurer: Johan Driessen
- Leader in the House of Representatives: Louis Bontes
- Founders: Louis Bontes; Joram van Klaveren; Johan Driessen
- Founded: 28 May 2014
- Dissolved: 20 March 2017
- Split from: Party for Freedom
- Headquarters: Het Plein 2, The Hague
- Ideology: Classical liberalism; Liberal conservatism; Right-wing populism; Euroscepticism
- Political position: Right-wing
- European affiliation: Alliance for Direct Democracy in Europe
- Colours: Blue

Website
- vnl.nu

VoorNederland (lit. 'For the Netherlands'; abbreviated VNL) was a Dutch political party. It had been active in the House of Representatives as the Bontes/Van Klaveren Group (Dutch: Groep Bontes/Van Klaveren), a parliamentary group founded in April 2014. The parliamentary group was succeeded by a political party in May 2014. After failing to win a seat in the 2017 general election, the party disbanded.

== History ==
The Bontes/Van Klaveren Group (Dutch: Groep Bontes/Van Klaveren) was a parliamentary group formed on 15 April 2014 by Louis Bontes and Joram van Klaveren, two Members of the House that had left the Party for Freedom (PVV), the party they were originally elected to represent.

On 28 May 2014, group members officially founded a new political party, VoorNederland, a classical liberal and liberal conservative and eurosceptic political party.

On 13 November 2014, the party announced that it would cooperate with the UK Independence Party in the Alliance for Direct Democracy in Europe.

In December 2014 and January 2015, VNL was joined by former PVV leader in the European Parliament Laurence Stassen and, leading up to the 2015 provincial elections, two provincial PVV representatives from Groningen and Gelderland. On 27 January 2015 it was announced that the members of the party Article 50 had voted to merge it into VoorNederland.

On 21 April 2015, it was announced that jurist and former lawyer Bram Moszkowicz would become the party leader and lijsttrekker of VoorNederland at the next Dutch general election, planned for 2017, but after nine months he was rejected by the party.

In the 2017 Dutch general election, VoorNederland failed to win a single seat, securing just 0.4% of the vote.

Because of its election failure and lack of money, the party was dissolved by its members congress on 18 June 2017.

== Ideology ==
VNL was a proponent of small government and proposed the introduction of a low flat tax rate. Furthermore, it supported investment in the police and defence, and it wanted to limit the powers of the European Union to a free trade area, and a stricter immigration policy, the party had ties with UKIP.
