= Patricia van der Kammen =

Dutch politician (born 1972)

Member of the European Parliament
- In office 27 September 2012 – 1 July 2014
- Constituency: Netherlands

Personal details
- Born: 8 April 1972 (age 54) Heerlen, Netherlands
- Party: Party for Freedom
- Education: Tilburg University

Patricia van der Kammen (born 8 April 1972) is a Dutch politician. She served as a Member of the European Parliament (MEP) for the Party for Freedom from 27 September 2012 to 1 July 2014. She also is a member of the States of North Brabant since 10 March 2011.

== Early life and career ==
Van der Kammen was born on 8 April 1972 in Heerlen. She studied psychology at the Tilburg University and graduated in 1999. Van der Kammen then started working as a policy employee at the same institution.

== Political career ==
Since 10 March 2011 Van der Kammen is a member of the States of North Brabant. In September 2011 she introduced a motion in which she called to stop or reduce the support of pay provided to ex-States-Provincial members in North Brabant. Van der Kammen was likely to be elected to the European Parliament when the Netherlands, and with it the Party for Freedom, gained another seat to the Parliament in December 2011. However, the seat the Party for Freedom gained went to Daniël van der Stoep, who previously had been a member but had resigned in September 2011. Van der Stoep was allowed to return because he was the highest listed candidate on the original Party for Freedom candidate list who wished to enter the European Parliament, the Party for Freedom however did not allow him to return to their party. The return of Van der Stoep to Parliament had been unexpected and Van der Kammen had already been announced as member on the Parliament website. However, Van der Kammen succeeded Barry Madlener in the European Parliament in September 2012 while remaining a member of the States-Provincial of North Brabant. Madlener, who was number eight on the candidate list of the Party for Freedom for the 2012 Dutch general election, was chosen to the House of Representatives. Van der Kammen herself had been number 32 and was not chosen. During her time in the European Parliament she was on political leave from her job at Tilburg University, and was allowed to return when she wanted.

Her term ended on 1 July 2014. Van der Kammen had been member amongst others of the Committee on Transport and Tourism and the Delegation for relations with the Korean Peninsula. She decided not to return to the European Parliament for personal and health reasons.

== Electoral history ==
Electoral history of Patricia van der Kammen
Year	Body	Party	Pos.	Votes	Result		Ref.
Year	Body	Party	Pos.	Votes	Party seats	Individual	Ref.
2019	Senate	Party for Freedom	13	0	5	Lost	
2021	House of Representatives	Party for Freedom	46	1,015	17	Lost	
