= 2014 European Parliament election in the Netherlands =

- 22 May 2014

26 seats to the European Parliament
- Turnout: 37.32%
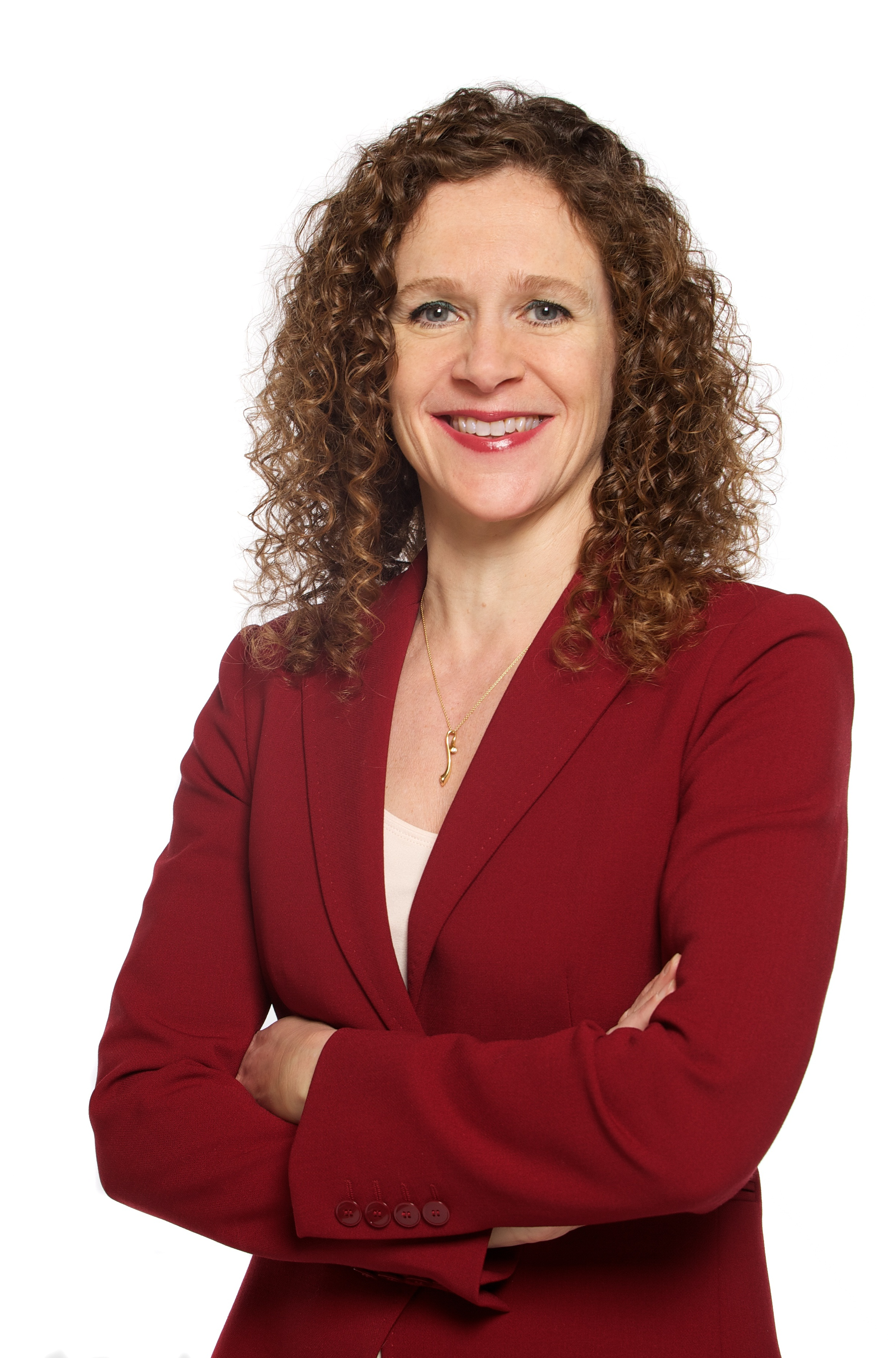

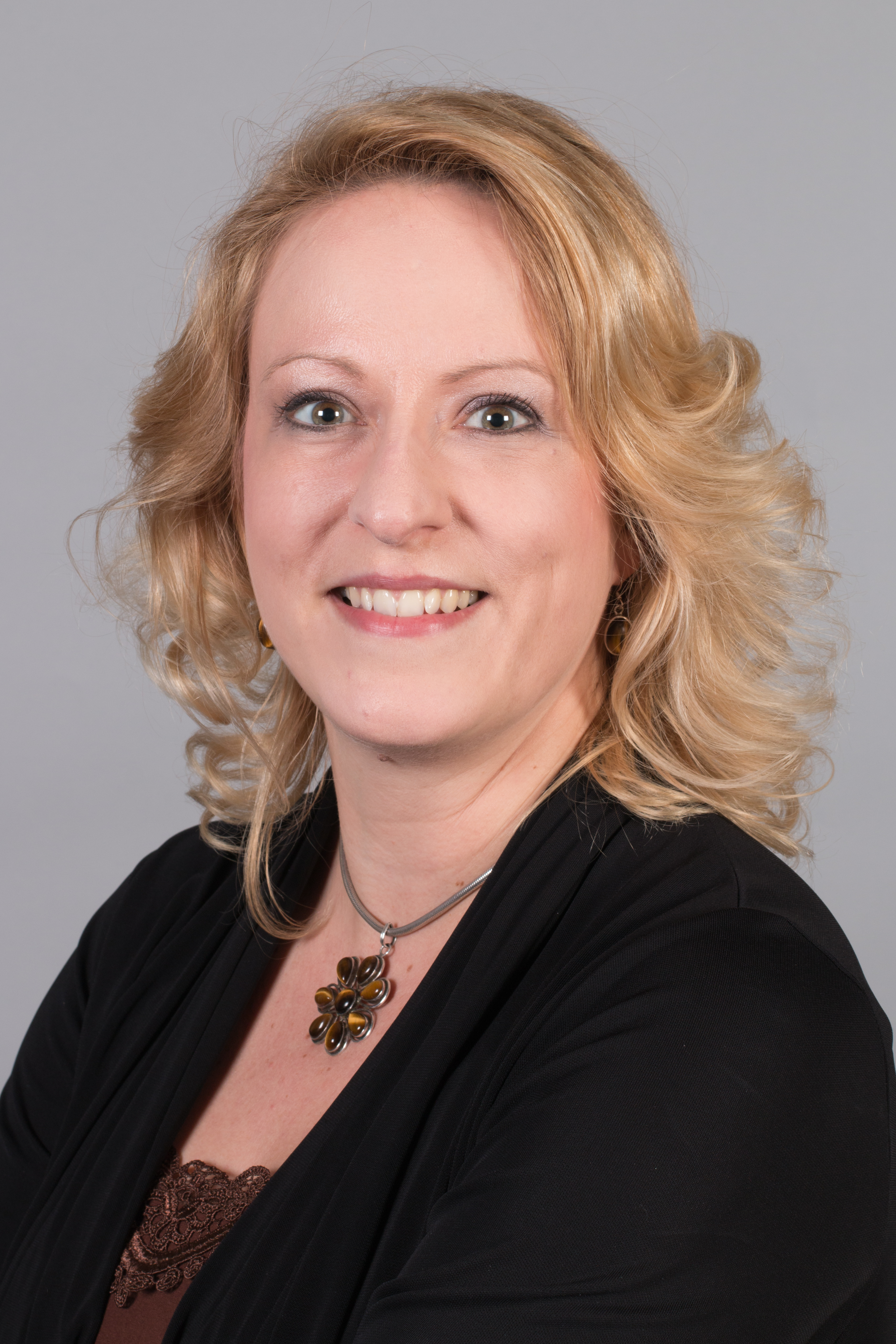

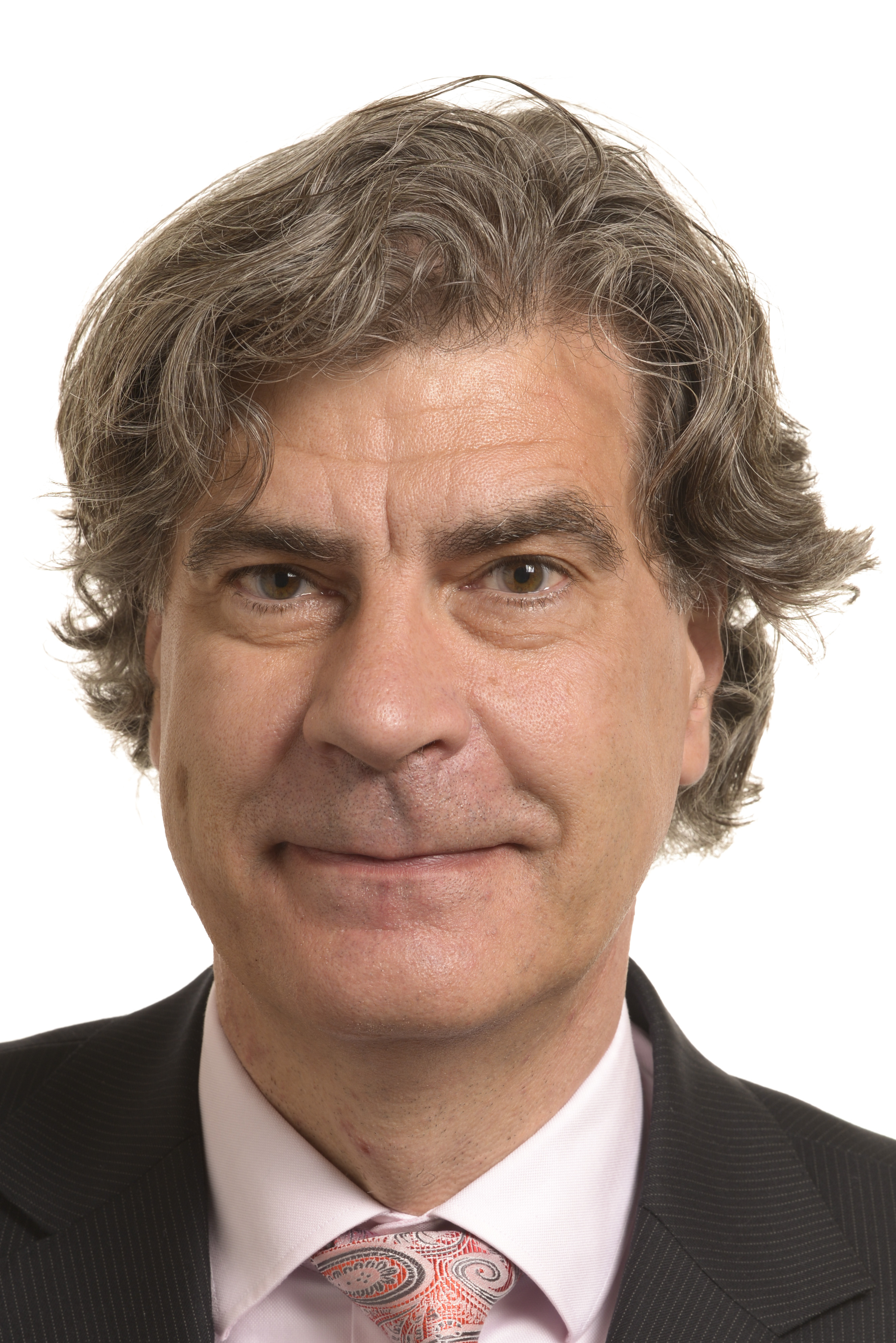

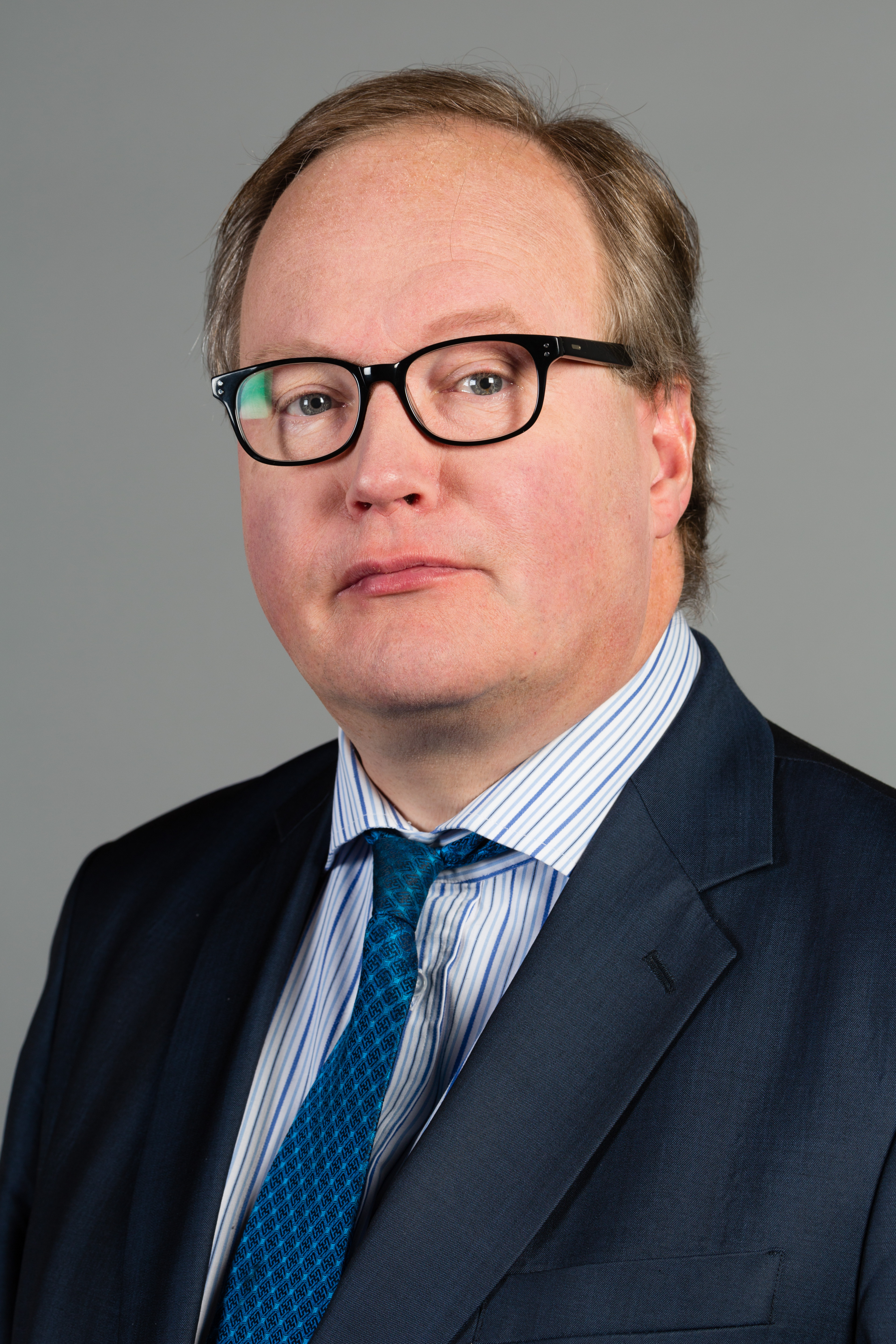

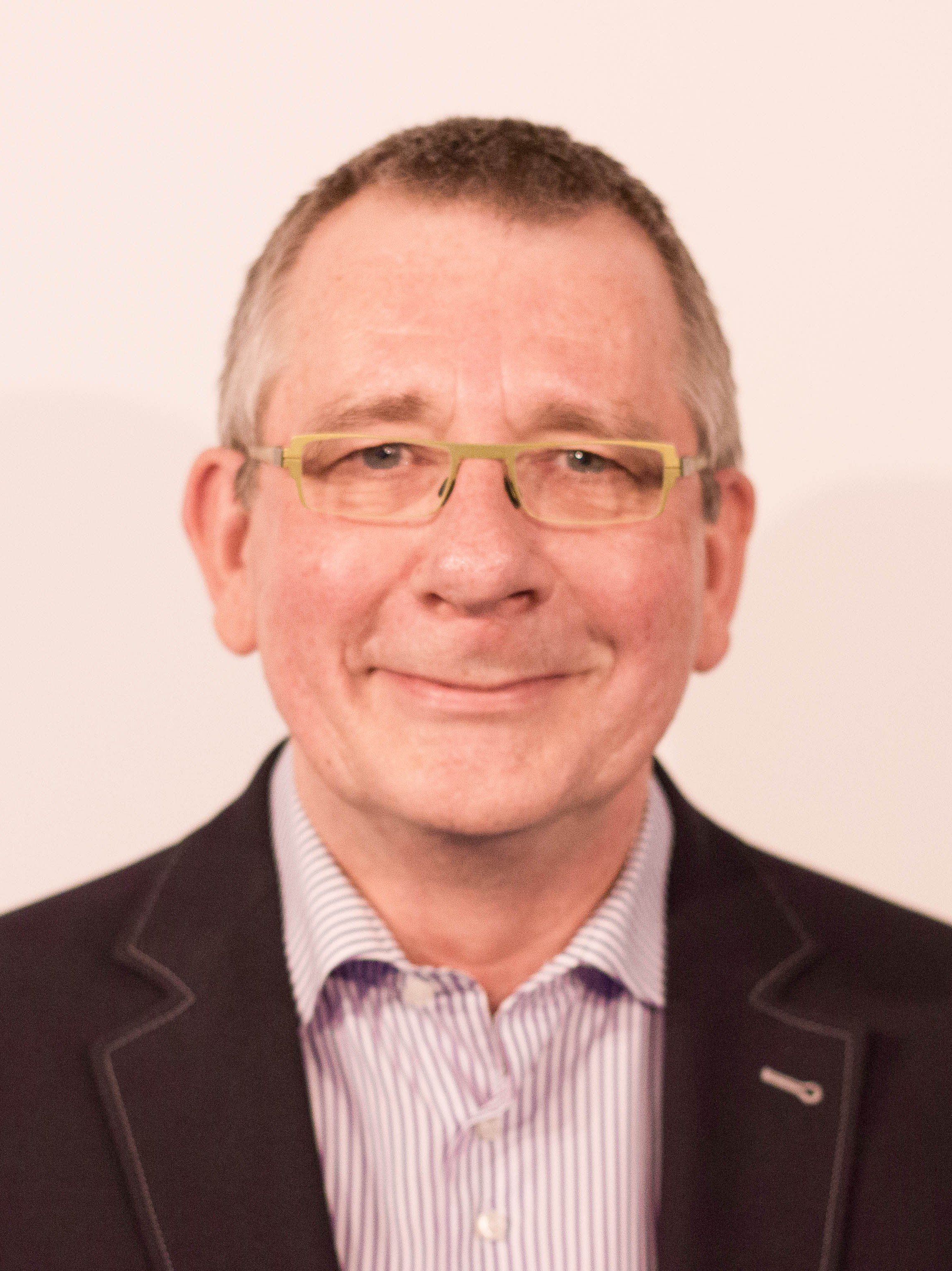

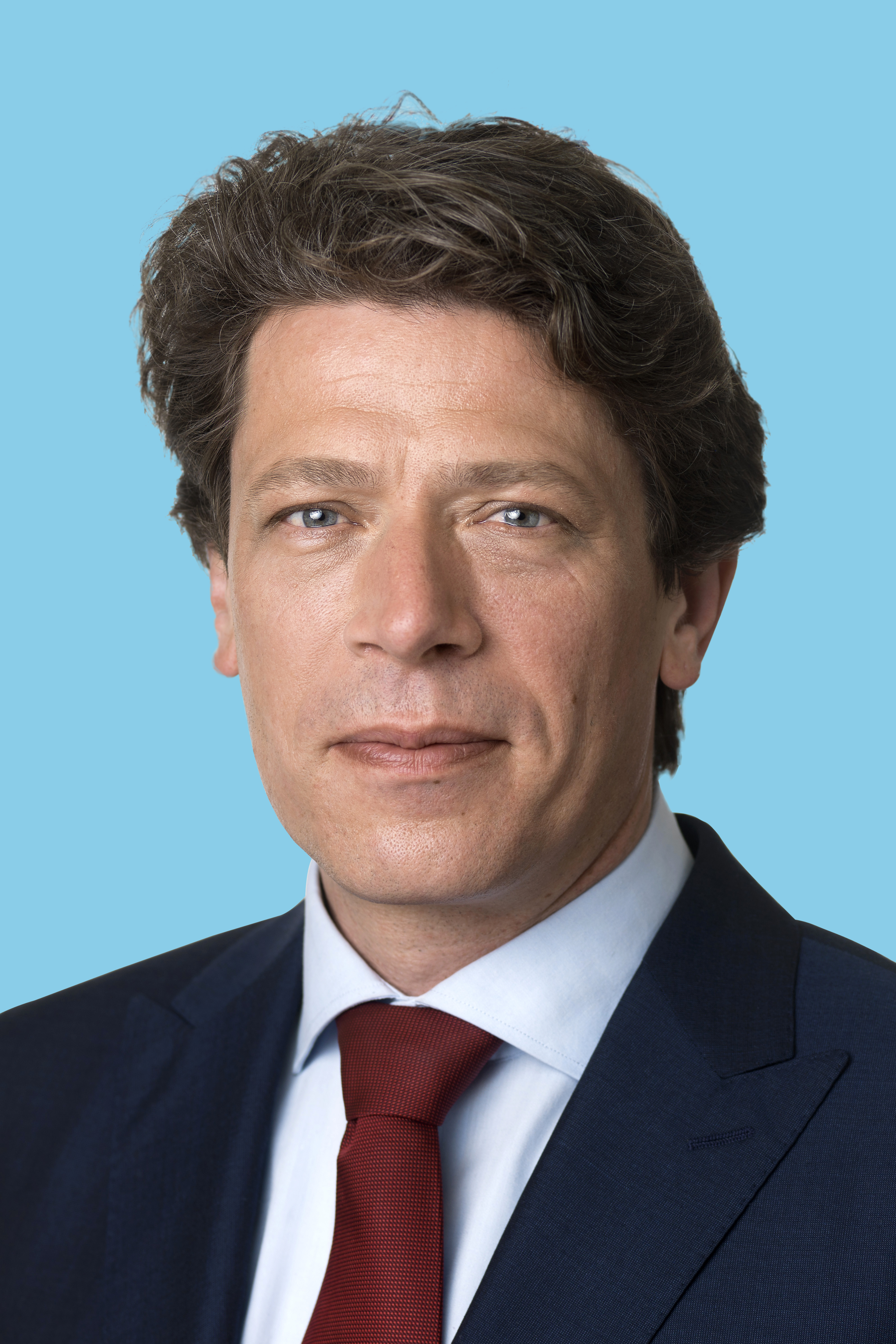

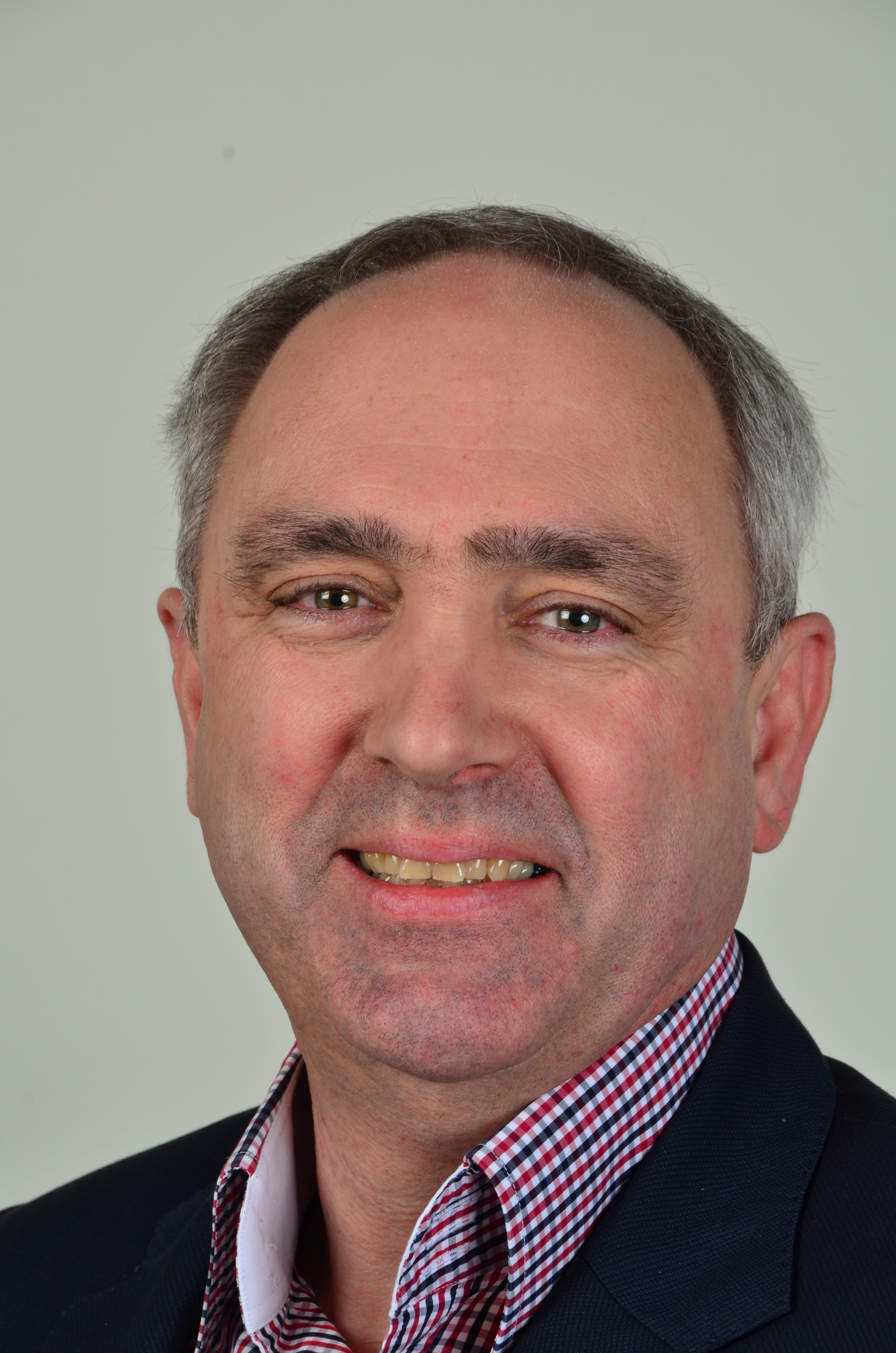

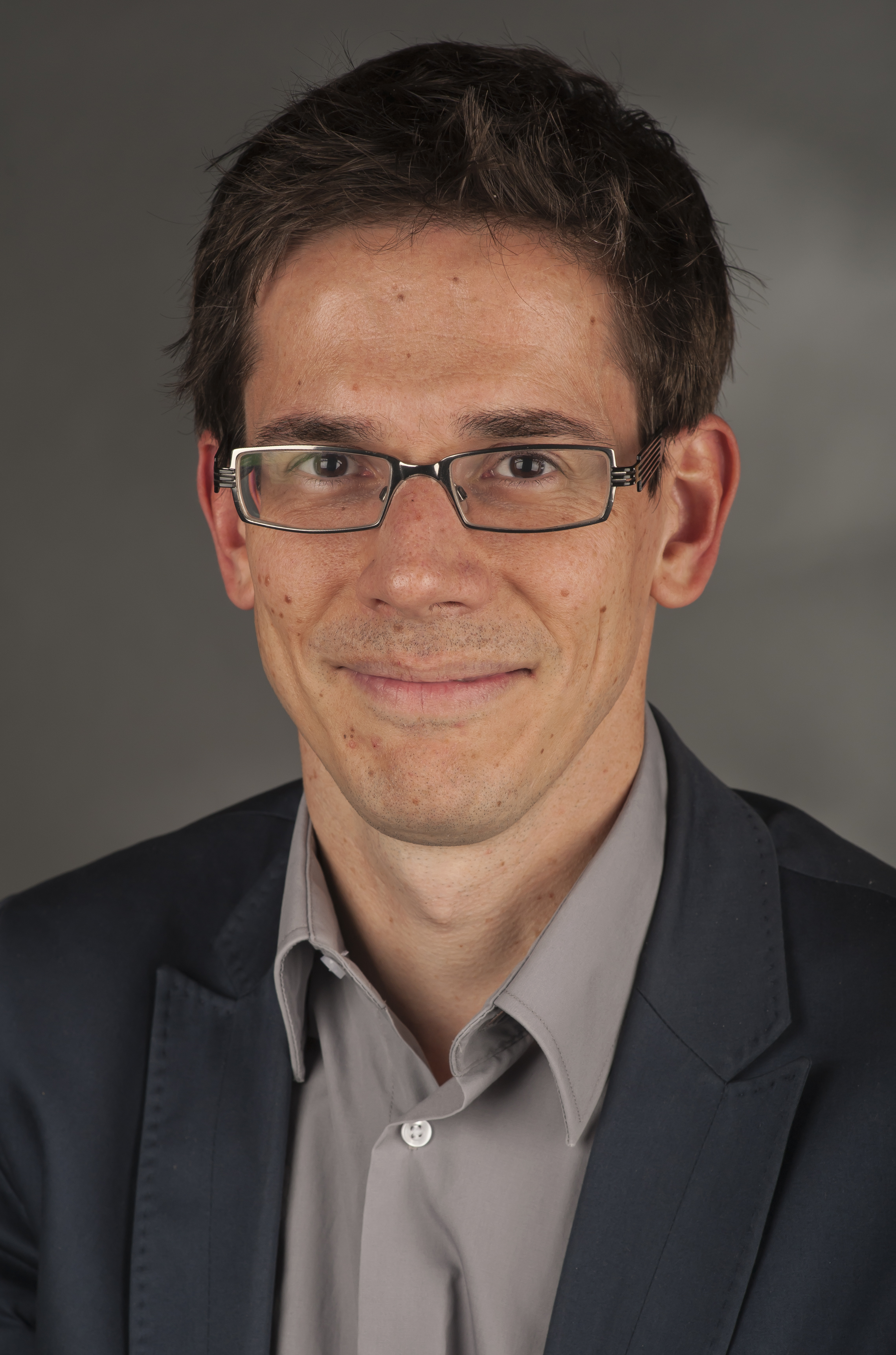

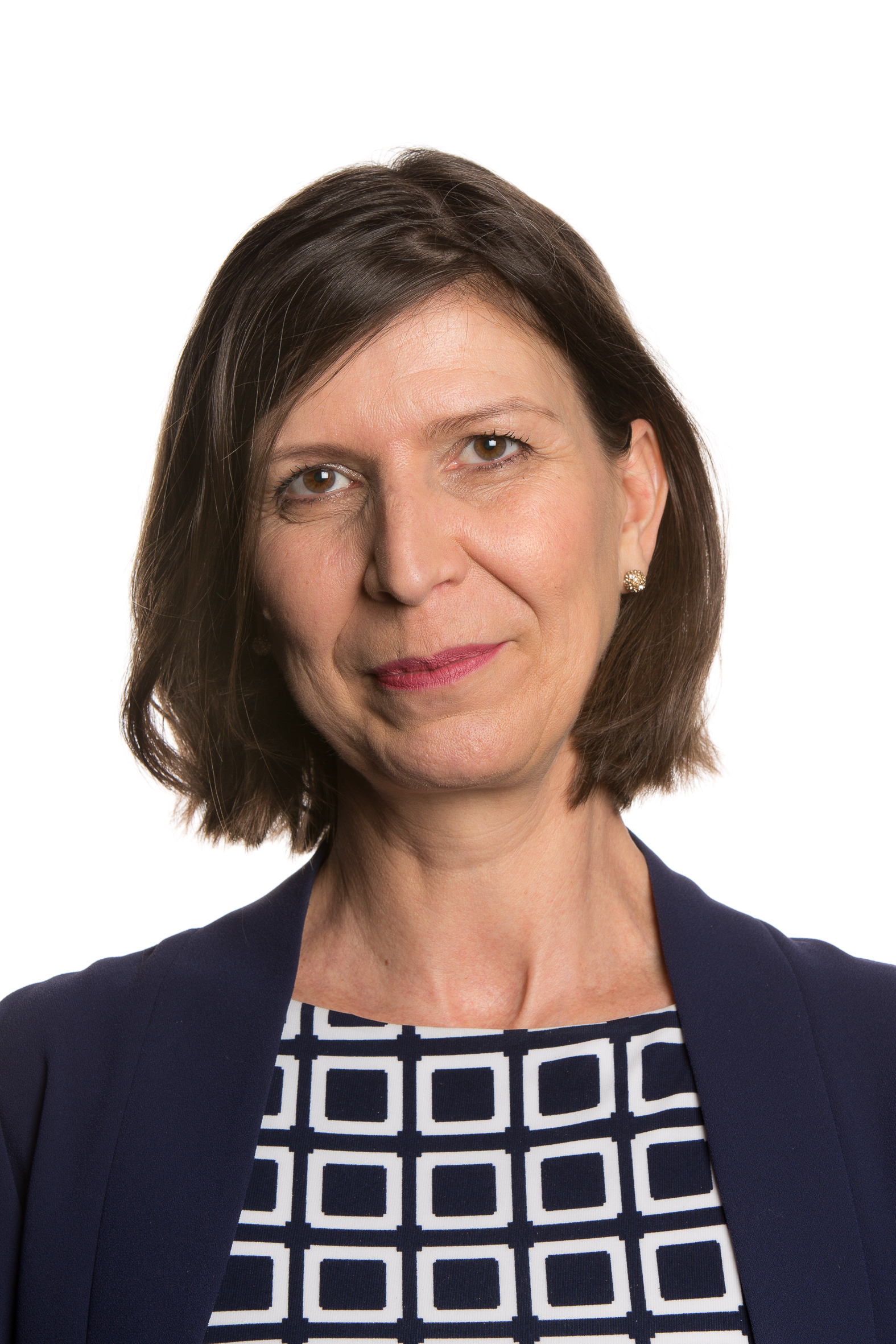
	First party	Second party	Third party
Leader	Sophie in 't Veld	Esther de Lange	Marcel de Graaff
Party	D66	CDA	PVV
Alliance	ALDE	EPP	ENF
Seats won	4 / 26	5 / 26	4 / 26
Seat change	1 ▲	0	1 ▼
Popular vote	735,825	721,766	633,114
Percentage	15.48%	15.18%	13.32%
Swing	4.16% ▲	4.87% ▼	3.65% ▼
	Fourth party	Fifth party	Sixth party
Leader	Hans van Baalen	Dennis de Jong	Paul Tang
Party	VVD	SP	PvdA
Alliance	ALDE	EUL/NGL	PES
Seats won	3 / 26	2 / 26	3 / 26
Seat change	0	0	0
Popular vote	571,176	458,079	446,763
Percentage	12.02%	9.64%	9.40%
Swing	0.63% ▲	2.54% ▲	2.65% ▼
	Seventh party	Eighth party	Ninth party
Leader	Peter van Dalen	Bas Eickhout	Anja Hazekamp
Party	CU–SGP	GL	PvdD
Alliance	ECR	Greens-EFA	EUL/NGL
Seats won	2 / 26	2 / 26	1 / 26
Seat change	0	1 ▼	1 ▲
Popular vote	364,843	331,594	200,254
Percentage	7.67%	6.98%	4.21%
Swing	0.85% ▲	1.89% ▼	0.75% ▲

An election of the Members of the European Parliament from the Netherlands was held on 22 May 2014. This is the 8th time the elections have been held for the European elections in the Netherlands.

== Background ==
=== Voting and election organisation ===
==== Active voting right ====
To cast a vote (for the right to vote) in elections for the European Parliament. The voter should:

- have either the Dutch nationality or the nationality of a European Union member state;
- be 18 years or older;
- not be disqualified from voting.

Non-Dutch citizens who are nationals of other Member States of the European Union may vote at the election of the European Parliament, provided that they:

- are living on the day of the candidates' nomination in the Netherlands;
- have attained the age of 18 on the day of the vote;
- are not disqualified from voting either in the Netherlands or in the Member State in which they are a citizen;
- have registered in a municipality with a statement that they want to vote in the Netherlands. (The so-called Y-32 form.)

Dutch nationals abroad have to register to vote for the elections to the European Parliament. Upon registration request, they must indicate whether they are voting by letter, by proxy, or in person at a polling station in the Netherlands. Dutch nationals living in another EU Member State must make a statement that they have not voted in the Member State in which they reside.

Dutch residents of Aruba, Curaçao and Sint Maarten have the same required as other Dutch living abroad. Dutch residents on Bonaire, St. Eustatius, and Saba have no need to register, because these islands are part of the Netherlands. They may, as in other Dutch municipalities, vote at their polling stations.

The number of granted requests for registration in 2014 was 23,799 individuals. This was down from 39,601 registered international voters in 2009. Of these registered voters, 21,017 indicated they wanted to vote by mail, 1,804 requested to vote in the Netherlands itself at a polling station, and 978 wanted to grant power of attorney to someone in the Netherlands.

==== Passive voting right ====
To stand for election (for the right to be elected), a candidate should:

- have either Dutch nationality or the nationality of a Member State of the European Union;
- be eighteen years on the day of possible admission to the European Parliament;
- not be excluded from the right to vote.

Non-Dutch candidates from other Member States of the European Union must, in addition, be an actual resident in the Netherlands and not be excluded from the right to be elected in the Member State of which they are a national.

==== Organisation of elections ====
In elections for the European Parliament, the national electoral districts play no role in the nomination. The Netherlands consists of a single electoral district. Political parties, therefore, take part in the elections with only a single candidate list.

Although the national electoral districts do play an important role in processing the election results. The principal polling station of each constituency determines the vote total of the constituency. The results of the vote are recorded in an official document and transferred to the Electoral Council. The Electoral Council, in its role as the central electoral committee, then determines the result of the Netherlands' distribution of seats.

The transfer of the official recorded votes to the Electoral Council took place in 18 constituencies on Monday, 26 May 2014. On Tuesday, 27 May, this transfer occurred for the two remaining constituencies where the municipalities Raalte, Kampen (constituency Zwolle), and Ouder-Amstel, (constituency Haarlem) experimented with a centralised counting of votes.

==== Casting a vote ====
A voter could cast their vote at a polling station of their choice within their own district. At the casting their vote, they could identify themselves with an identity document which is considered valid even if it has expired within the last 5 years.

Voters who voted in the election for the European Parliament in 2014 from outside the Netherlands experimented with a new model ballot. In this new ballot, parties were allowed to show the party logo above their candidates if it had been registered in advance with the Electoral Council.

==== Participation of political groups ====
On Monday, 14 April 2014, the Electoral Council had a public hearing on the validity of the lists of candidates for the election of the Dutch seats for the European Parliament. The candidate list of the Women's Party was declared invalid because the required deposit to participate (€11,250) was not paid. Furthermore, the following candidates of the Party for the Animals were deleted because their documentation was incomplete and, as such, could not participate in the election:

- Tom Regan (United States);
- Will Kymlicka (Canada);
- J. M. Coetzee (Australia).

==== Numbering of the candidates list ====
In the public hearing on 14 April 2014, the Electoral Council numbered the lists of candidates. The parties who had obtained one or more seats in 2009 at the last election to the European Parliament were given a number based on the number of votes that the parties had achieved in the previous election. These totaled 8 candidate lists. The party with the most votes got number 1 and the rest were listed accordingly. The list numbers for the remaining 11 candidates were decided by a lottery.

Official order and names of the lists for the European Parliament election in the Netherlands
List		English translation	List name (Dutch)
1	list	CDA - European People's Party	CDA — Europese Volkspartij
2	list	PVV (Party for Freedom)	PVV (Partij voor de Vrijheid)
3	list	P.v.d.A./European Social Democrats	P.v.d.A./Europese Sociaaldemocraten
4	list	VVD	
5	list	Democrats 66 (D66) - ALDE	Democraten 66 (D66) - ALDE
6	list	GreenLeft	GroenLinks
7	list	SP (Socialist Party)	SP (Socialistische Partij)
8	list	Christian Union-SGP	ChristenUnie–SGP
9	list	Article 50	Artikel 50
10	list	IQ, the Rights-Obligations-Party	IQ, de Rechten-Plichten-Partij
11	list	Pirate Party	Piratenpartij
12	list	50PLUS	
13	list	The Greens	De Groenen
14	list	Anti EU(ro) Party	Anti EU(ro) Partij
15	list	Liberal Democratic Party	Liberaal Democratische Partij
16	list	Jesus Lives	Jezus Leeft
17	list	ichooseforhonest.eu	ikkiesvooreerlijk.eu
18	list	Party for the Animals	Partij voor de Dieren
19	list	Focus and Simplicity	Aandacht en Eenvoud

==== Common lists ====
A common list consists of 2 distinct parties which are sharing the same candidate list. The Christian Union and SGP formed a common list Christian Union-SGP for the European Parliament election.

==== Electoral alliances ====
Several parties formed an electoral alliance.

1. CDA/European People's Party and ChristenUnie-SGP
2. PvdA/European Social-Democrats and GreenLeft

==== Election day ====
Traditionally, all elections are held on Wednesday in the Netherlands. Sunday is not an option because it is a resting day for Christians, while Friday and Saturday are impossible, because of the Sabbath. Monday is also impossible, because then all preparation for an election would need to happen on the weekend. That leaves Tuesday, Wednesday and Thursday as possible election days. Many polling stations are located in schools, therefore, Wednesday is chosen because it is usually the quietest day of the week for classes. However, the European Parliament Elections run from Thursday to Sunday across the entire European Union. Therefore, Thursday is the election day for the European Parliament Elections.

=== Treaty of Lisbon ===
According to the Treaty of Lisbon, the Netherlands was awarded 26 seats in the European parliament. This is one more than the election of 2009. The last elections were held when the treaty was not yet in effect, because not all member states had ratified the treaty. The treaty came into effect during the last session of the European Parliament. The additional seat was then awarded to the Party of Freedom on 9 October 2011 based on the results of the 2009 election. This increased the numbers of seats for the PVV from 4 to 5 for the 2009–2014 session.

== Campaign ==
=== Campaign posters ===
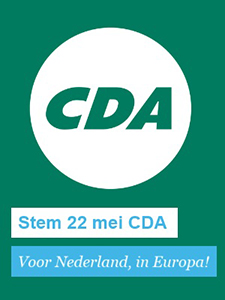
CDA campaign poster "Vote CDA on 22 may. For the Netherlands, in Europe!"

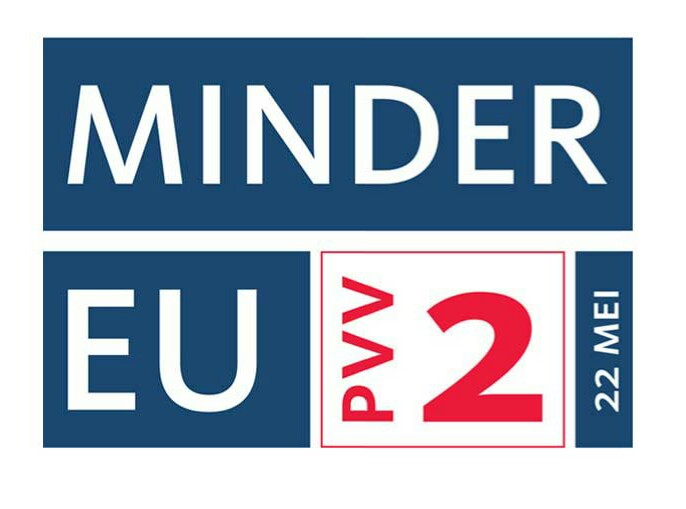
PVV campaign poster "Less - EU"

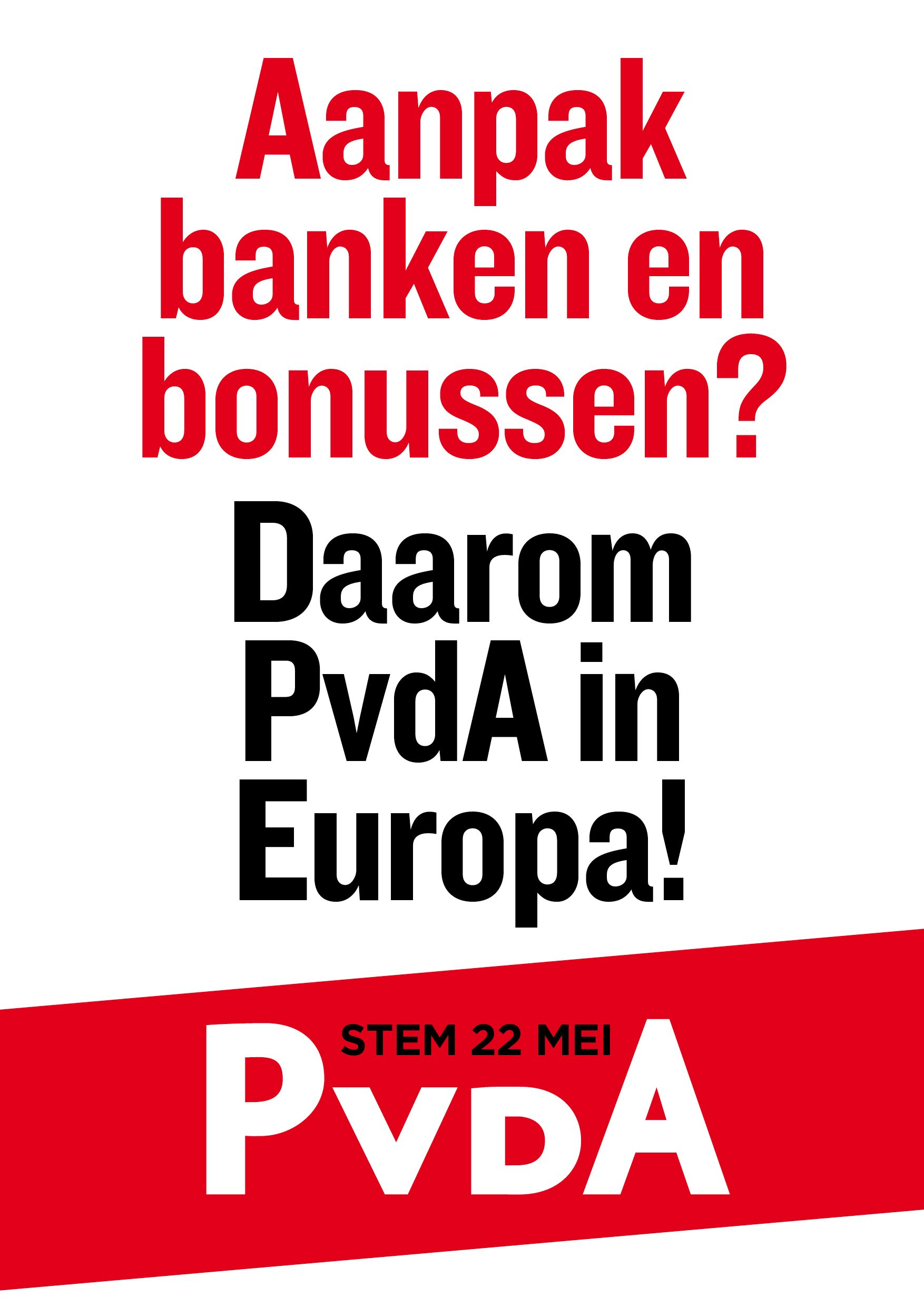
PvdA campaign poster "Do something about banks and bonuses? - That's why PvdA in Europe!"

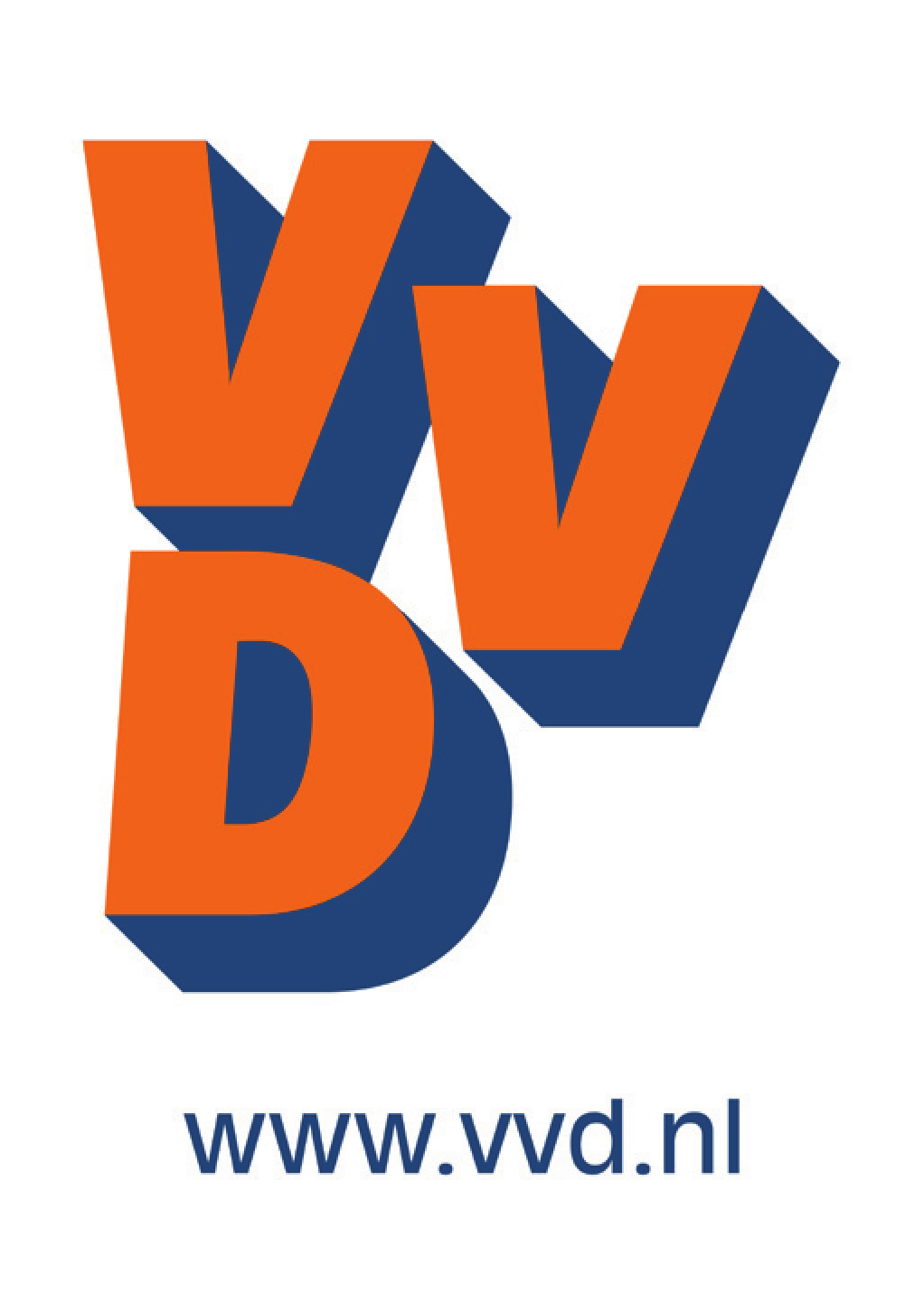
VVD campaign poster "VVD.nl"

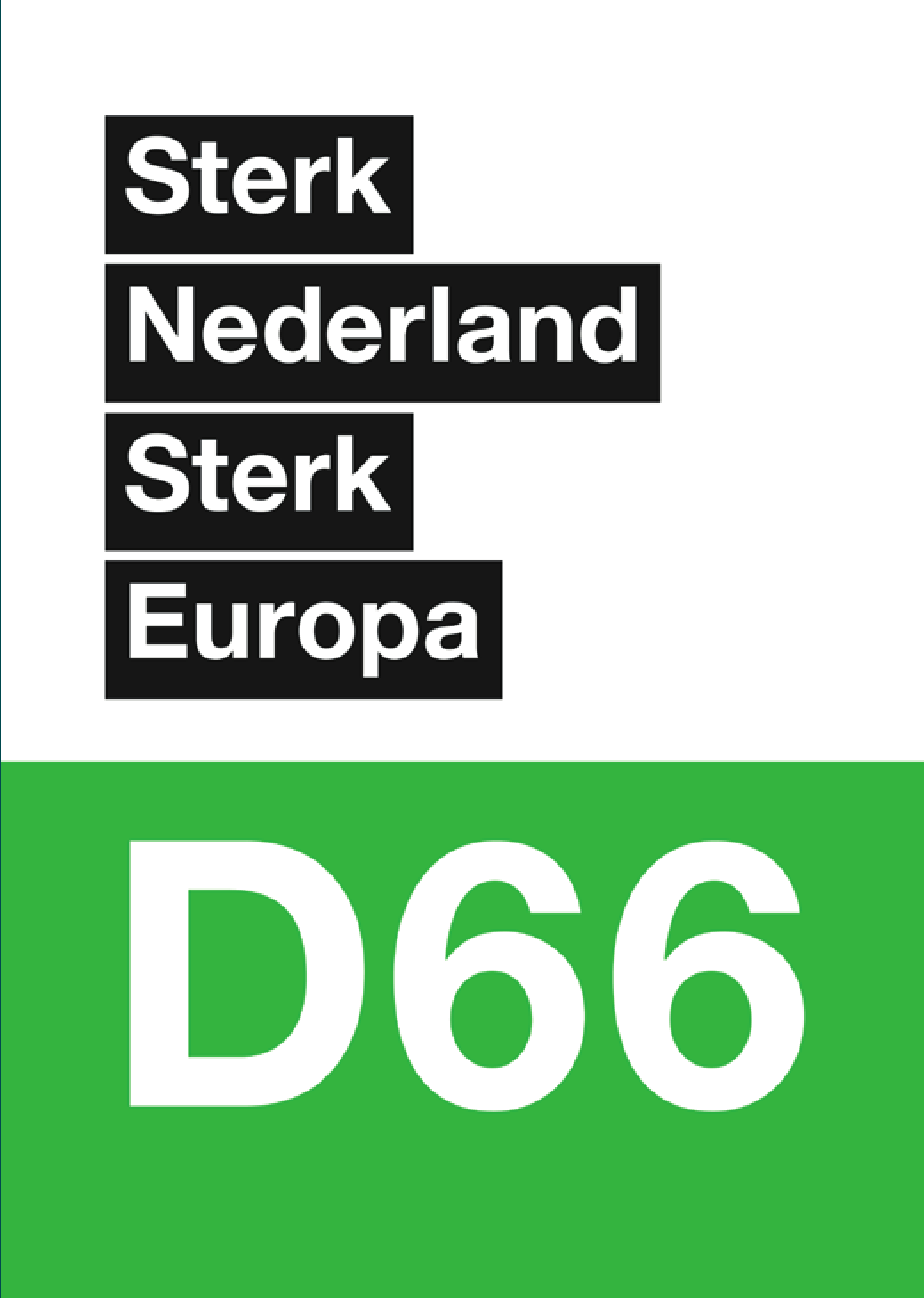
D66 campaign poster "Strong Europe - Strong Netherlands"

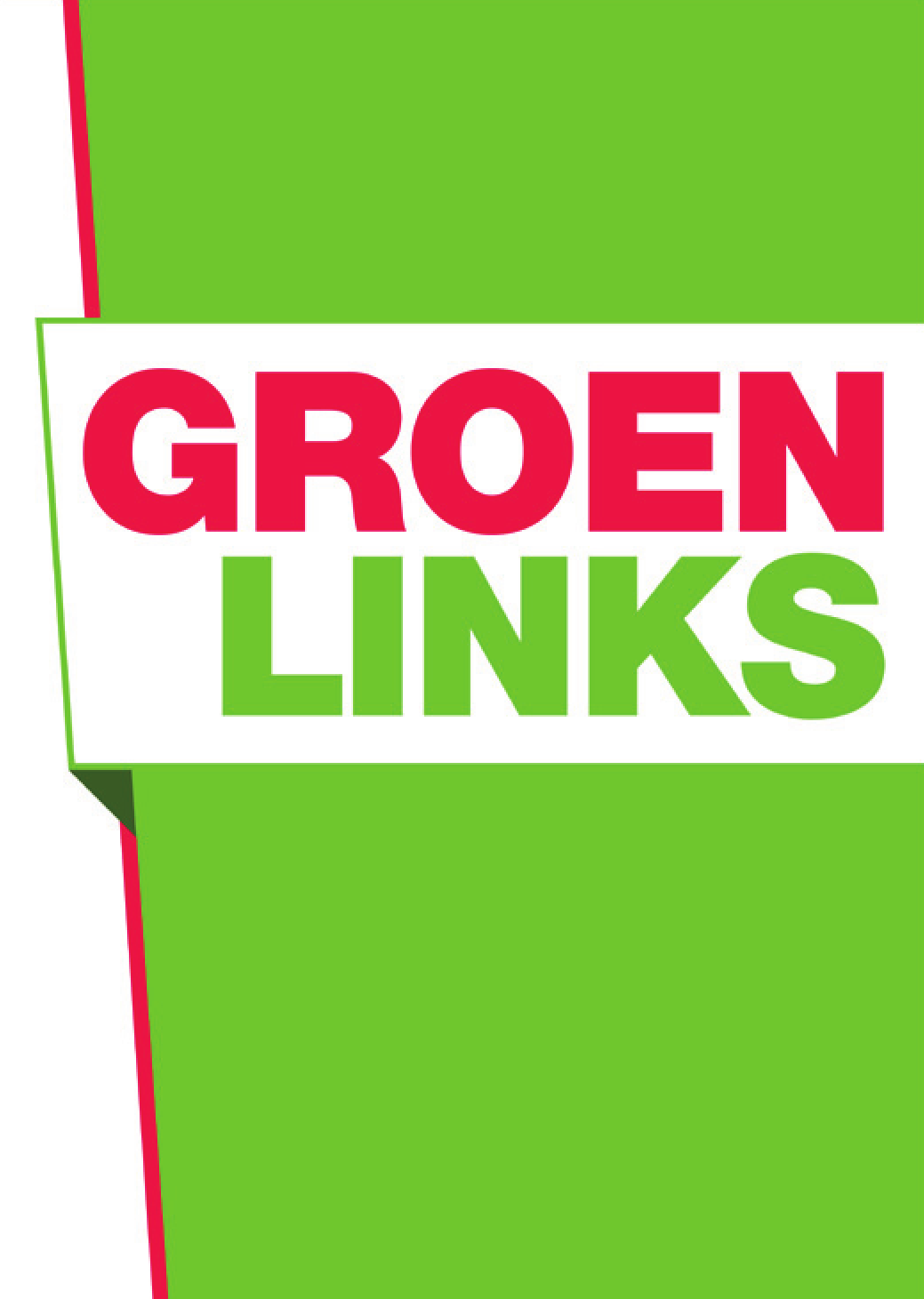
GreenLeft campaign poster "GreenLeft"

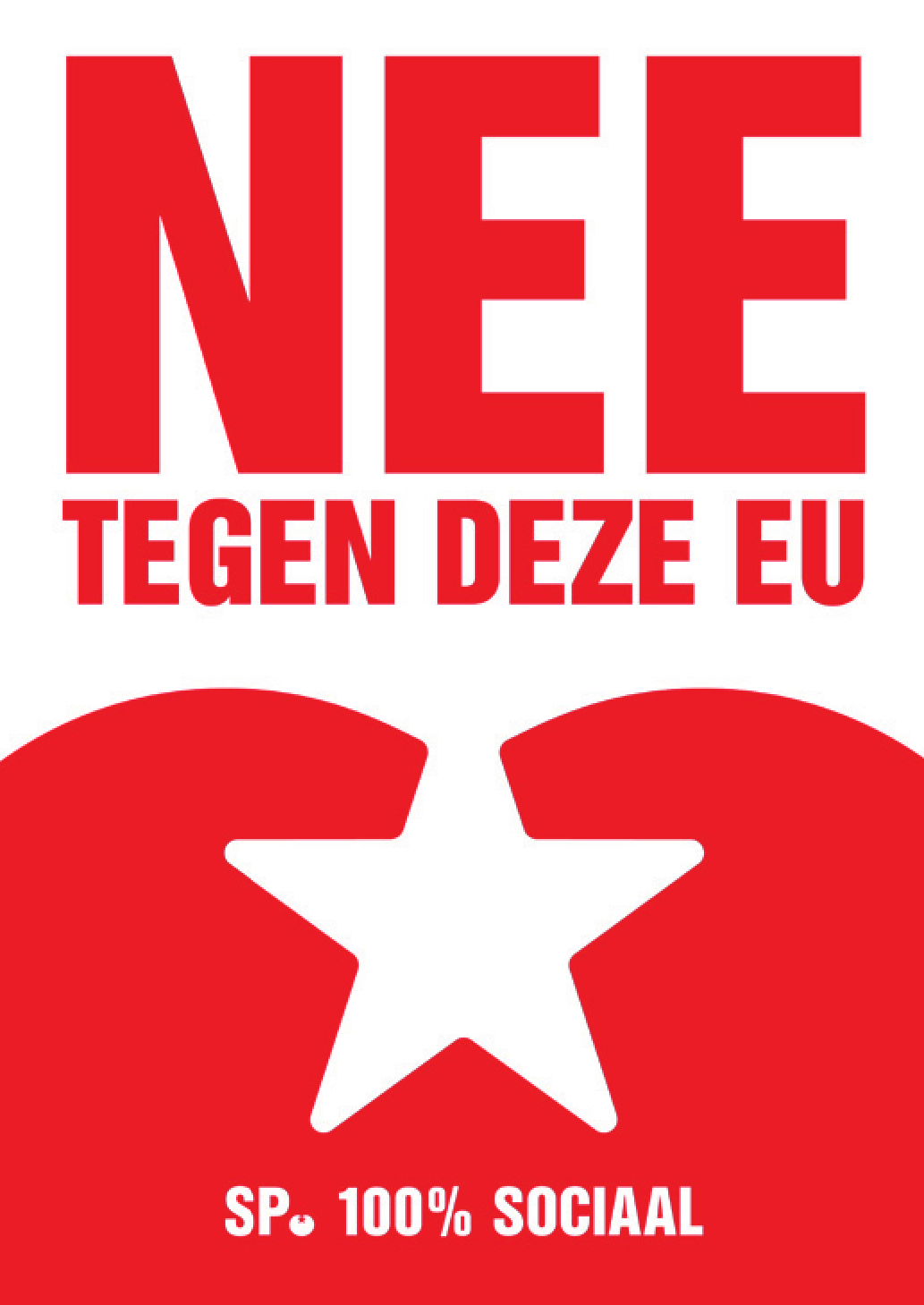
SP campaign poster "No, against this EU"

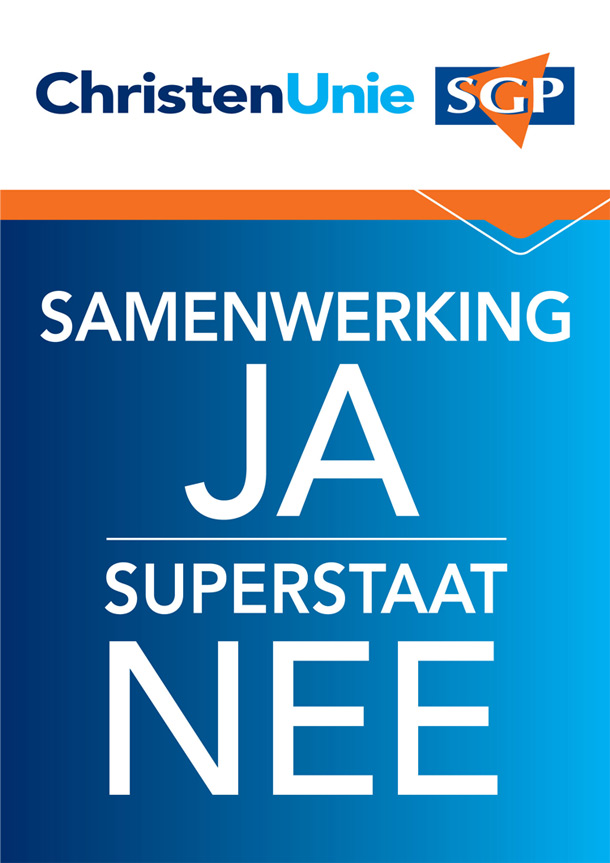
Christian Union - SGP campaign poster "Working together YES - Superstate NO"

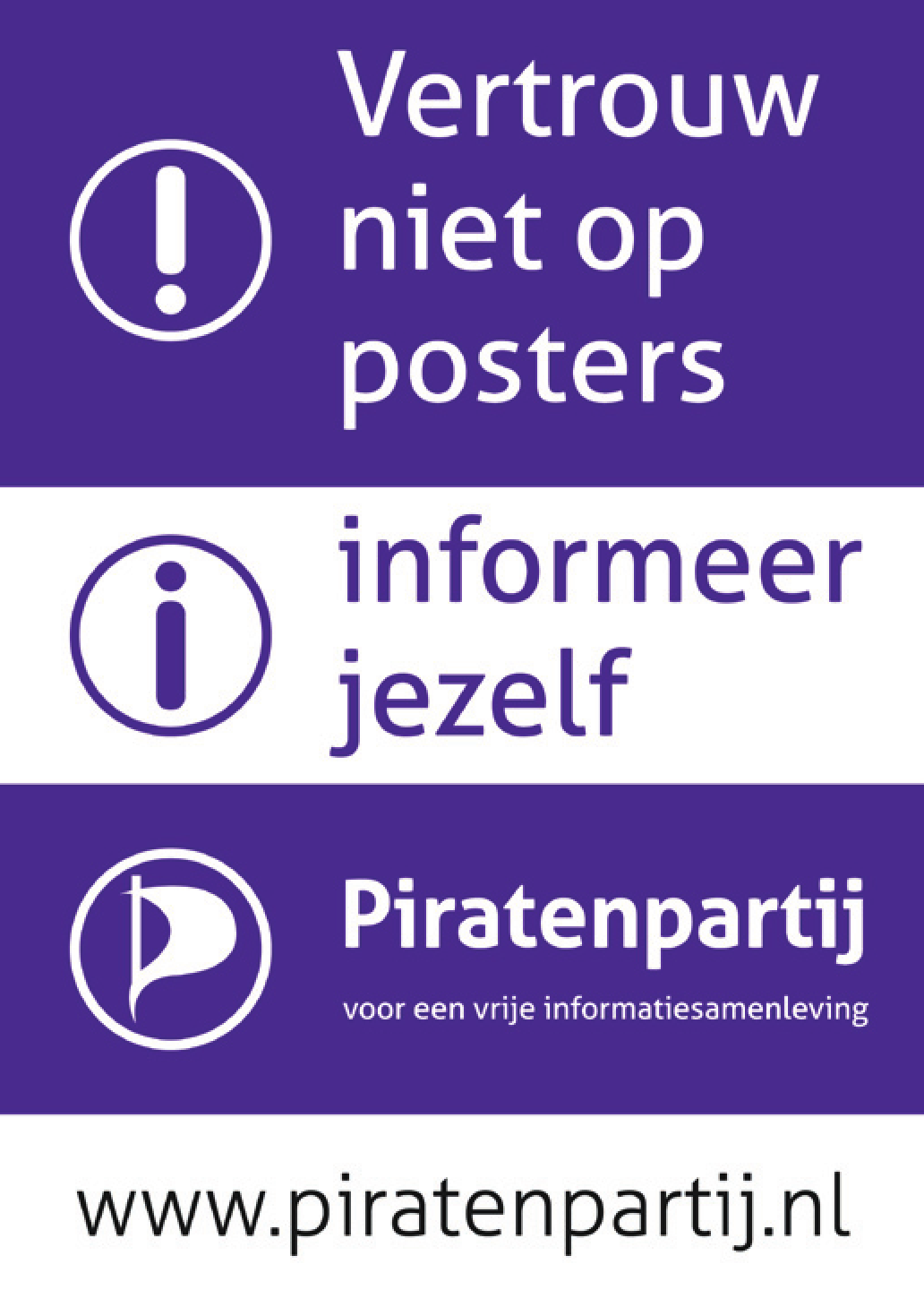
Pirate Party campaign poster "Don't trust posters. Inform yourself. Pirate Party"

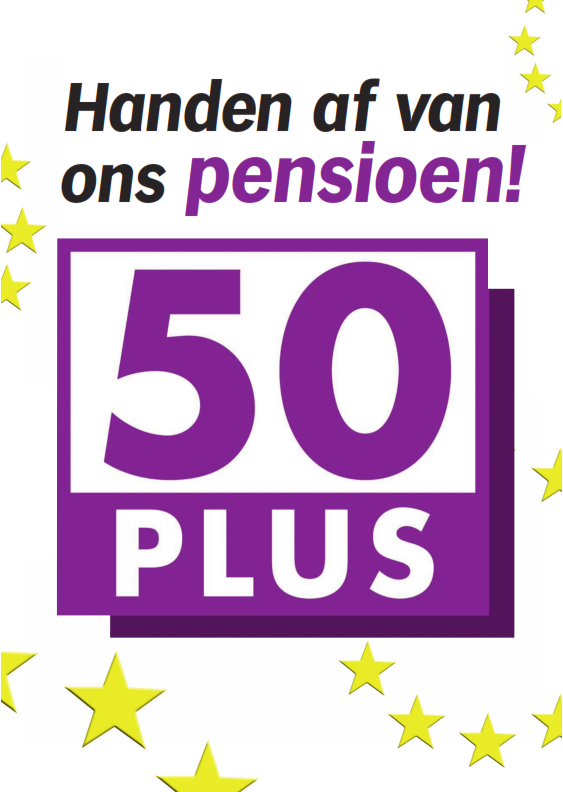
50PLUS campaign poster "Don't touch our pensions. 50PLUS"

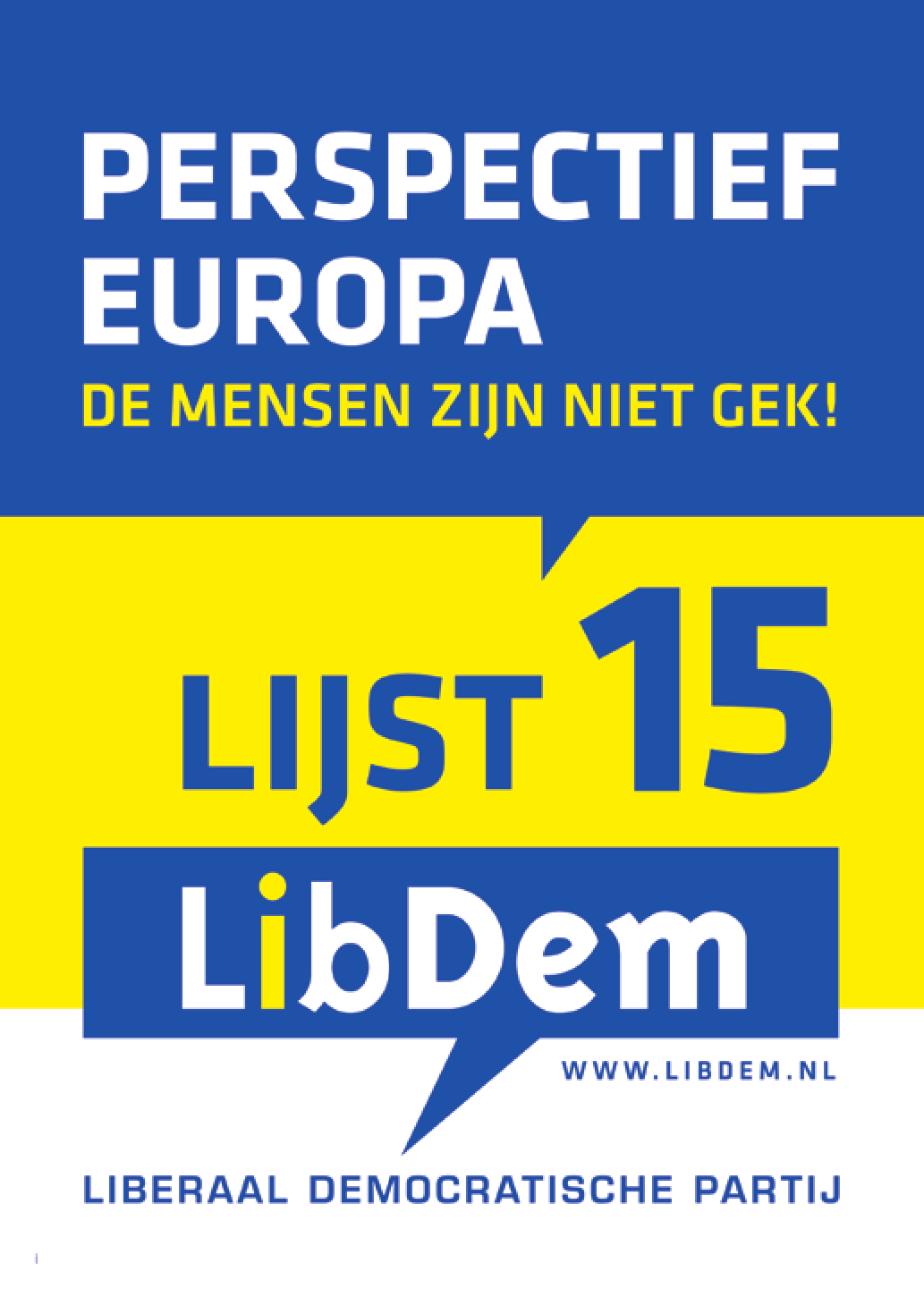
Liberal Democratic Party campaign poster "Perspective Europe, the people are not insane"

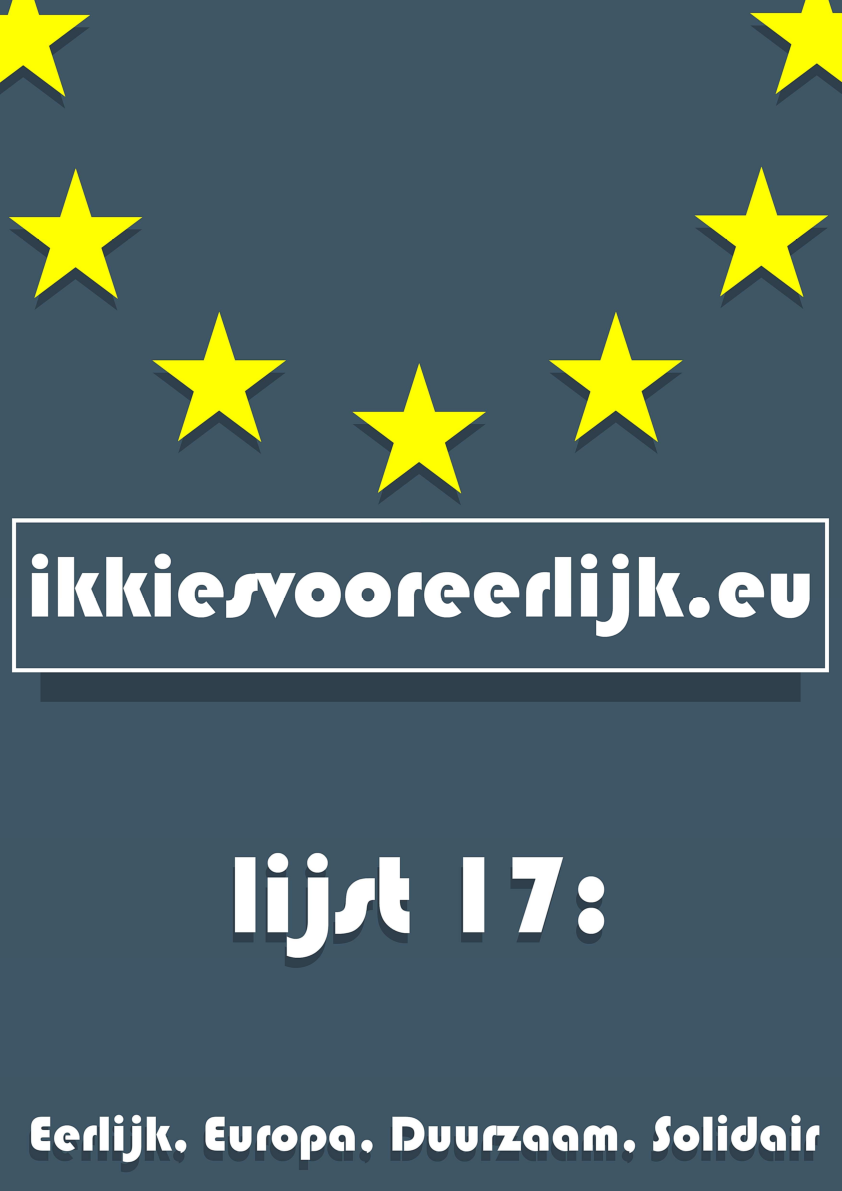
ichooseforhonest.eu campaign poster "ikkiesvooreerlijk.eu"

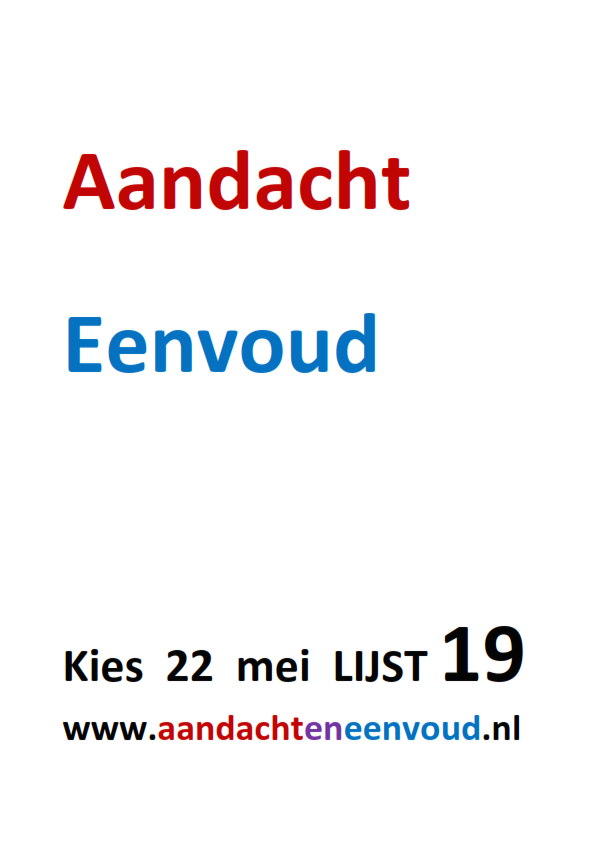
Focus and Simplicity campaign poster "Focus Simplicity"

=== Polls ===
Poll results are listed in the tables below in reverse chronological order. The highest figure in each survey is displayed in bold type, and the background is shaded in the colour the party. In the instance that there is a tie, then no figure is shaded.

==== Seats ====
Date	Polling Firm	VVD	PvdA	PVV	SP	CDA	D66	CU−SGP	GL	PvdD	50PLUS	Others		
Date	Polling Firm	26 May (Preliminary results)	ANP	3	3	4	2	**5**	4	2	2	1	0	0
22 May (Exit polls)	Ipsos	3	3	3	3	**4**	**4**	2	2	1	1	0		
18 May	Peil (prognosis)	3–4	2–3	**4–5**	3–4	4–5	**4–5**	2–3	1–2	0–1	0–1	0		
15 May	TNS Nipo	3–4	2–3	3–4	3–4	2–3	**4–6**	2–3	2	0–1	1	0		
16 Apr	TNS Nipo	**4–5**	2–3	**4–5**	2–3	2–3	3–5	2–3	1–2	0–1	0–1	0–1		
13 Apr	Peil	**4**	2	**4**	3	**4**	**4**	2	1	1	1	0		
6 Mar	Ipsos	**4**	3	**4**	**4**	3	**4**	2	1	0	1	0		
11 Jan	TNS Nipo	**5**	3	**5**	4	3	3	1	1	0	1	0		
2014
4 June 2009	Election results	3	3	4	2	**5**	3	2	3	0	0	0		

==== Percentages ====
Date	Polling Firm	VVD	PvdA	PVV	SP	CDA	D66	CU−SGP	GL	PvdD	50PLUS	Others
26 May (Preliminary results)	ANP	11.9%	9.4%	13.2%	9.6%	15%	**15.4%**	7.6%	7.0%	4.2%	3.7%	3%
22 May (Exit polls)	Ipsos	12.3%	9.4%	12.2%	10.0%	15.2%	**15.6%**	7.8%	7.3%	4.2%	4.2%	1.1%
15 May	TNS Nipo	12.3%	9.9%	11.9%	11.9%	11.3%	**19.3%**	9.5%	6.0%	1.6%	3.8%	2.5%
16 Apr	TNS Nipo	16.2%	10.5%	**18.1%**	9.9%	11.1%	15.7%	8.3%	4.7%	1.0%	2.8%	1.8%
13 Apr	Peil	**15%**	8%	**15%**	11%	**15%**	**15%**	7%	4%	4%	4%	1%
6 Mar	Ipsos	**16%**	10%	**16%**	14%	13%	15%	6.7%	3.7%	2.7%	3.5%	N/A
11 Jan	TNS Nipo	16.4%	12.2%	**17.2%**	13.2%	10.6%	12.3%	6.2%	3.7%	2.2%	3.8%	1.7%
2014
4 June 2009	Election results	11.4%	12.1%	17.0%	7.1%	20.1%	11.3%	6.8%	8.9%	3.5%	−	2.0%

== Results ==
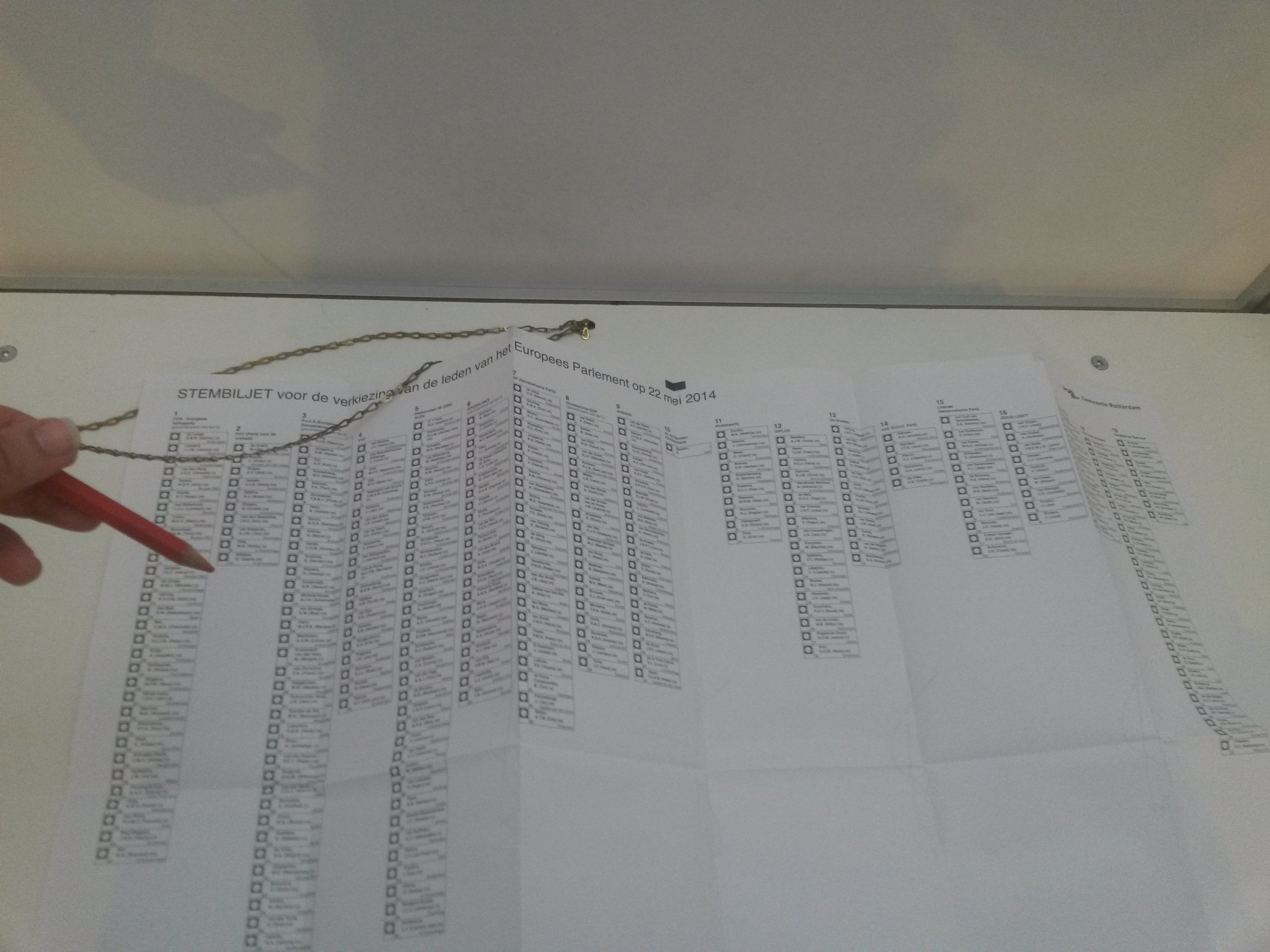
Voting ballot

The Christian Democratic Appeal won the most seats and was seen as the winner of the 2014 elections, although Democrats 66 received more votes. The Christian Democratic Appeal got an extra seat due to their electoral alliance with Christian Union – Reformed Political Party. The eurosceptic PVV (Party for Freedom) was the biggest loser of the 2014 elections, though it only lost one seat. Contrary to other European countries, the eurosceptic movement did worse than previous elections.

Voter turnout was with 37.32%, which is a little higher than in 2009 (36.75%). Turnout was highest in Schiermonnikoog (70.95%) and lowest in Sint Eustatius (7.44%).

Party	Votes	%	Seats	+/–
Democrats 66	735,825	15.48	4	+1
Christian Democratic Appeal	721,766	15.18	5	0
Party for Freedom	633,114	13.32	4	–1
People's Party for Freedom and Democracy	571,176	12.02	3	0
Socialist Party	458,079	9.64	2	0
Labour Party	446,763	9.40	3	0
Christian Union – Reformed Political Party	364,843	7.67	2	0
GroenLinks	331,594	6.98	2	–1
Party for the Animals	200,254	4.21	1	+1
50PLUS	175,343	3.69	0	New
Pirate Party	40,216	0.85	0	New
Article 50	24,069	0.51	0	New
Anti EU(ro) Party	12,290	0.26	0	New
The Greens	10,883	0.23	0	0
Jesus Lives	9,507	0.20	0	New
ichooseforhonest.eu	6,796	0.14	0	New
Liberal Democratic Party	6,349	0.13	0	0
Focus and Simplicity	3,174	0.07	0	New
IQ, the Rights–Obligations-Party	1,705	0.04	0	New
Total	4,753,746	100.00	26	+1
Valid votes	4,753,746	99.40		
Invalid/blank votes	28,505	0.60		
Total votes	4,782,251	100.00		
Registered voters/turnout	12,815,496	37.32		
Source: Kiesraad

=== European groups ===
Summary:

- The ALDE remained the biggest group in the Netherlands. They increased their seats from 6 to 7, thanks to Democrats 66 seat win.
- The PVV (Party for Freedom) founded and joined the ENF, they were Non-Inscrits before.
- The SGP (Reformed Political Party) joined the ECR and left the EFD group. The Christian Union and SGP, which were in separate groups since 2009 rejoined the same group again.
- The Party for the Animals joined the GUE/NGL group, increasing their seats from 2 to 3.
- The G-EFA lost one seat, because GreenLeft lost one.

EPP	S&D	ECR	ALDE	GUE/NGL	G-EFA	EFDD	ENF	(Netherlands) Total
5 (CDA)	3 (PvdA)	2 (CU-SGP)	4 (D66); 3 (VVD)	2 (SP); 1 (PvdD)	2 (GL)		4 (PVV)	26

Summary of the 22 May 2014 European Parliament elections in the Netherlands
2014
European group		Seats 2009	Seats 2014	Change
Alliance of Liberals and Democrats for Europe	ALDE	6	7	1 ▲
European People's Party	EPP	5	5	0
Europe of Nations and Freedom	ENF	none	4	4 ▲
Progressive Alliance of Socialists and Democrats	S&D	3	3	0
European United Left–Nordic Green Left	EUL-NGL	2	3	1 ▲
The Greens–European Free Alliance	Greens-EFA	3	2	1 ▼
European Conservatives and Reformists	ECR	1	2	1 ▲
Europe of Freedom and Democracy	EFD	1	0	1 ▼
Non-Inscrits	NI	4+1	0	5 ▼
		25(+1)	26	0
