= List of members of the European Parliament (2004–2009) =

This is a list of members of the European Parliament serving in the sixth term (2004–2009). It is sorted by an English perception of surname treating all variations of de/di/do, van/von, Ó, and so forth as part of the collation key, even if this is not the normal practice in a member's own country.

This list was initially published by the Parliament at the convening on 20 July 2004, amended on 21 July when the Lega Nord affiliated to the Independence and Democracy group, and then further updated with replacements. Members from Bulgaria and Romania, appointed by their parliaments, became full members on 1 January 2007; some of these participated in the formation of the new Identity, Tradition, Sovereignty group in the following sitting of the Parliament, but this broke up later the same year.

== List ==
Name	Country	Region	Party	Group
Adamos Adamou	Cyprus		AKEL	EUL/NGL
Vittorio Agnoletto	Italy	Southern	RC	EUL/NGL
Vincenzo Aita from 19 June 2006	Italy		RC	EUL/NGL
Gabriele Albertini	Italy	North-West	FI	EPP-ED
Jim Allister	United Kingdom	Northern Ireland	DUP	NI
Alexander Nuno Alvaro	Germany		FDP	ALDE
Jan Andersson	Sweden		S	PES
Georgs Andrejevs	Latvia		LC	ALDE
Laima Liucija Andrikienė	Lithuania		TS-LK	EPP-ED
Emmanouil Angelakas from 1 October 2007	Greece		ND	EPP-ED
Roberta Angelilli	Italy	Central	AN	UEN
Rapisardo Antinucci from 17 June 2008	Italy	Central	PS	PES
Alin Lucian Antochi from 21 January 2009	Romania		PSD	PES
Alfredo Antoniozzi	Italy	Central	FI	EPP-ED
Kader Arif	France	Sud-Ouest	PS	PES
Stavros Arnaoutakis	Greece		PASOK	PES
Richard Ashworth	United Kingdom	South East England	Con	EPP-ED
Francisco Assis	Portugal		PS	PES
Robert Atkins	United Kingdom	North West England	Con	EPP-ED
John Attard Montalto	Malta		MLP	PES
Elspeth Attwooll	United Kingdom	Scotland	Lib Dem	ALDE
Marie-Hélène Aubert	France	Ouest	Les Verts	Greens-EFA
Jean-Pierre Audy from 11 June 2005	France	Massif central – Centre	UMP	EPP-ED
Margrete Auken	Denmark		SF	Greens-EFA
Inés Ayala Sender	Spain		PSOE	PES
Liam Aylward	Republic of Ireland	East	FF	UEN
María del Pilar Ayuso González	Spain		PP	EPP-ED
Peter Baco	Slovakia		LS – HZDS	NI
María Badía i Cutchet (also Badía i Cutxet)	Spain		PSOE	PES
Marielka Velichkova Baeva from 6 June 2007	Bulgaria		DPS	ALDE
Enrique Barón Crespo	Spain		PSOE	PES
Etelka Barsiné Pataky	Hungary		FIDESZ/MPSZ	EPP-ED
Paolo Bartolozzi from 23 June 2008	Italy	Central	FI	EPP-ED
Domenico Antonio Basile from 17 June 2008	Italy	Southern	AN	UEN
Gerard Batten	United Kingdom	London	UKIP	IND/DEM
Alessandro Battilocchio	Italy	Central	NPSI	NI
Aikaterini Batzeli	Greece		PASOK	PES
Edit Bauer	Slovakia		MKP	EPP-ED
Daniel Bautista from 26 March 2009	Spain		PP	EPP-ED
Jean-Marie Beaupuy	France	Est	UDF	ALDE
Christopher Beazley	United Kingdom	East of England	Con	EPP-ED
Zsolt Becsey	Hungary		FIDESZ/MPSZ	EPP-ED
Glenn Bedingfield	Malta		MLP	PES
Angelika Beer	Germany		Die Grünen	Greens-EFA
Bastiaan Belder	Netherlands		ChristenUnie /SGP	IND/DEM
Ivo Belet	Belgium	Flemish Community	CD&V/N-VA	EPP-ED
Irena Belohorská	Slovakia		LS – HZDS	NI
Jean-Luc Bennahmias	France	Sud-Est	Les Verts	Greens-EFA
Monika Beňová	Slovakia		SMER	PES
Rolf Berend	Germany	Thuringia	CDU	EPP-ED
Pervenche Berès	France	Ile-de-France	PS	PES
Maria Berger from 11 December 2008	Austria		SPÖ	PES
Sergio Berlato	Italy	North-East	AN	UEN
Giovanni Berlinguer	Italy	North-East	DS	PES
Thijs Berman	Netherlands		PvdA	PES
Adam Bielan	Poland	MP & SW	PiS	UEN
Slavcho Binev from 6 June 2007	Bulgaria		NSA	NI
Šarūnas Birutis	Lithuania		DP	ALDE
Hans Blokland	Netherlands		ChristenUnie /SGP	IND/DEM
Godfrey Bloom	United Kingdom	Yorkshire and the Humber	UKIP	IND/DEM
Jana Bobošiková	Czech Republic			NI
Sebastian Valentin Bodu from 10 December 2007	Romania		PSD	EPP-ED
Reimer Böge	Germany	Schleswig-Holstein	CDU	EPP-ED
Guy Bono	France	Sud-Est	PS	PES
Vito Bonsignore	Italy	North-West	UDC	EPP-ED
Mario Borghezio	Italy	North-West	LN	UEN
Josep Borrell Fontelles	Spain		PSOE	PES
Herbert Bösch	Austria		SPÖ	PES
Erminio Enzo Boso from 23 June 2008	Italy	North-East	LN	UEN
Victor Boştinaru from 10 December 2007	Romania		PSD	PES
Costas Botopoulos from 1 October 2007	Greece		PASOK	PES
Catherine Boursier from 18 May 2008	France	Est	PS	PES
John Bowis	United Kingdom	London	Con	EPP-ED
Sharon Bowles from 12 May 2005	United Kingdom	South East England	Lib Dem	ALDE
Emine Bozkurt	Netherlands		PvdA	PES
Philip Bradbourn	United Kingdom	West Midlands	Con	EPP-ED
Iles Braghetto from 28 July 2005	Italy	North-East	UDC	EPP-ED
Mihael Brejc	Slovenia		SDS	EPP-ED
Frederika Brepoels	Belgium	Flemish Community	N-VA	EPP-ED
Hiltrud Breyer	Germany		Die Grünen	Greens-EFA
Jan Březina	Czech Republic		KDU-CSL	EPP-ED
André Brie	Germany		PDS	EUL/NGL
Elmar Brok	Germany	North Rhine-Westphalia	CDU	EPP-ED
Danutė Budreikaitė	Lithuania		DP	ALDE
Kathalijne Buitenweg	Netherlands		GroenLinks	Greens-EFA
Wolfgang Bulfon from 18 January 2007	Austria		SPÖ	PES
Udo Bullmann	Germany		SPD	PES
Nicodim Bulzesc from 10 December 2007	Romania		PSD	EPP-ED
Colm Burke from 19 June 2007	Republic of Ireland	South	FG	EPP-ED
Philip Bushill-Matthews	United Kingdom	West Midlands	Con	EPP-ED
Niels Busk	Denmark		V	ALDE
Cristian Silviu Buşoi from 24 April 2007	Romania		PNL	ALDE
Philippe Busquin from 13 September 2004	Belgium	French Community	PS	PES
Simon Busuttil	Malta		PN	EPP-ED
Jerzy Buzek	Poland	SL	PO	EPP-ED
Milan Cabrnoch	Czech Republic		ODS	EPP-ED
Maddalena Calia from 12 September 2008	Italy	Islands	FI	EPP-ED
Martin Callanan	United Kingdom	North East England	Con	EPP-ED
Mogens Camre	Denmark		DF	UEN
Marco Cappato from 8 May 2006	Italy		Lista Bonino	ALDE
Luis Manuel Capoulas Santos	Portugal		PS	PES
Marie-Arlette Carlotti	France	Sud-Est	PS	PES
Maria Carlshamre	Sweden		Fp	ALDE
Giorgio Carollo	Italy	North-East	FI	EPP-ED
David Casa	Malta		PN	EPP-ED
Paulo Casaca	Portugal		PS	PES
Michael Cashman	United Kingdom	West Midlands	Lab	PES
Carlo Casini from 8 May 2006	Italy		UDC	EPP-ED
Daniel Caspary	Germany	Baden-Württemberg	CDU	EPP-ED
Françoise Castex	France	Sud-Ouest	PS	PES
Giusto Catania	Italy	North-West	RC	EUL/NGL
Jean-Marie Cavada	France	Sud-Ouest	UDF	ALDE
Charlotte Cederschiöld	Sweden		M	EPP-ED
Alejandro Cercas	Spain		PSOE	PES
Jorgo Chatzimarkakis	Germany		FDP	ALDE
Giles Chichester	United Kingdom	South West England	Con	EPP-ED
Giulietto Chiesa	Italy	Southern or North-West	SCDO	ALDE
Călin Cătălin Chiriţă from 22 December 2008	Romania		PD-L	EPP-ED
Zdzisław Chmielewski	Poland	LB & ZP	Civic Platform	EPP-ED
Ole Christensen	Denmark		SD	PES
Sylwester Chruszcz	Poland	DS & OP	LPR	IND/DEM
Desislav Chukolov from 6 June 2007	Bulgaria		NSA	NI
Fabio Ciani from 16 May 2008	Italy	Central	PD	PES
Paolo Cirino Pomicino	Italy	Southern	AP-UDEUR	EPP-ED
Philip Claeys	Belgium	Flemish Community	VlB	NI
Derek Clark	United Kingdom	East Midlands	UKIP	IND/DEM
Luigi Cocilovo	Italy	Islands	Margherita	ALDE
Carlos Coelho	Portugal		PPD-PSD	EPP-ED
Daniel Cohn-Bendit	Germany		Die Grünen	Greens-EFA
Trevor Colman from 1 October 2008	United Kingdom	South West England	UKIP	IND/DEM
Richard Corbett	United Kingdom	Yorkshire and the Humber	Lab	PES
Dorette Corbey	Netherlands		PvdA	PES
Giovanna Corda from 31 August 2007	Belgium	French Community	PS	PES
Thierry Cornillet	France	Sud-Est	UDF	ALDE
Paolo Costa	Italy	North-East	Margherita	ALDE
Jean-Louis Cottigny	France	Nord-Ouest	PS	PES
Paul-Marie Coûteaux	France	Ile-de-France	MPF	IND/DEM
Michael Cramer	Germany		Die Grünen	Greens-EFA
Jan Cremers from 30 April 2008	Netherlands		PvdA	PES
Corina Creţu from 1 January 2007	Romania		PSD	PES
Gabriela Creţu from 1 January 2007	Romania		PSD	PES
Brian Crowley	Republic of Ireland	South	FF	UEN
Magor Imre Csibi from 10 December 2007	Romania		PNL	ALDE
Marek Czarnecki	Poland	MA	Samoobrona	UEN
Ryszard Czarnecki	Poland	DS & OP	Samoobrona	UEN
Hanne Dahl from 9 May 2008	Denmark		Juni B.	IND/DEM
Daniel Dăianu from 10 December 2007	Romania		PNL	ALDE
Vasilica Dăncilă from 21 January 2009	Romania		PSD	PES
Joseph Daul	France	Est	UMP	EPP-ED
Dragoş Florin David from 10 December 2007	Romania		PSD	EPP-ED
Chris Davies	United Kingdom	North West England	Lib Dem	ALDE
Antonio de Blasio from 31 July 2006	Hungary		FIDESZ/MPSZ	EPP-ED
Bairbre de Brún	United Kingdom	Northern Ireland	SF	EUL/NGL
Luis de Grandes Pascual	Spain		PP	EPP-ED
Els de Groen-Kouwenhoven	Netherlands		ET	Greens-EFA
Véronique de Keyser	Belgium	French Community	PS	PES
Esther de Lange from 12 April 2007	Netherlands		CDA	EPP-ED
Gianni De Michelis	Italy	Southern	NPSI	NI
Proinsias De Rossa	Republic of Ireland	Dublin	Labour Party	PES
Marielle de Sarnez	France	Ile-de-France	UDF	ALDE
Christine de Veyrac	France	Sud-Ouest	UMP	EPP-ED
Philippe de Villiers	France	Ouest	MPF	IND/DEM
Mia De Vits	Belgium	Flemish Community	SP.A	PES
Arūnas Degutis	Lithuania		DP	ALDE
Jean-Luc Dehaene	Belgium	Flemish Community	CD&V	EPP-ED
Pilar del Castillo Vera	Spain		PP	EPP-ED
Panayiotis Demetriou	Cyprus		DISY	EPP-ED
Jean-Paul Denanot from 6 October 2008	France	Massif central – Centre	PS	PES
Gérard Deprez	Belgium	French Community	MCC	ALDE
Marie-Hélène Descamps	France	Massif central – Centre	UMP	EPP-ED
Harlem Désir	France	Ile-de-France	PS	PES
Albert Dess	Germany	Bavaria	CSU	EPP-ED
Nirj Deva	United Kingdom	South East England	Con	EPP-ED
Agustín Díaz de Mera García Consuegra	Spain		PP	EPP-ED
Jolanta Dičkutė	Lithuania		DP	ALDE
Gintaras Didžiokas	Lithuania		LVLS	UEN
Rosa María Díez Gonzalez	Spain		PSOE	PES
Koenraad Dillen	Belgium	Flemish Community	VlB	NI
Giorgos Dimitrakopoulos	Greece		ND	EPP-ED
Alexandra Dobolyi	Hungary		MSZP	PES
Beniamino Donnici from 15 November 2007	Italy		Ind	PES
Bert Doorn	Netherlands		CDA	EPP-ED
Manuel dos Santos	Portugal		PS	PES
Brigitte Douay	France	Nord-Ouest	PS	PES
Den Dover	United Kingdom	North West England	Con	EPP-ED
Avril Doyle	Republic of Ireland	East	FG	EPP-ED
Mojca Drčar Murko	Slovenia		LDS/DeSUS	ALDE
Konstantinos Droutsas from 3 June 2008	Greece		KKE	EUL/NGL
Petr Duchoň	Czech Republic		ODS	EPP-ED
Andrew Duff	United Kingdom	East of England	Lib Dem	ALDE
Bárbara Dührkop Dührkop	Spain		PSOE	PES
Garrelt Duin	Germany		SPD	PES
Árpád Duka-Zólyomi	Slovakia		MKP	EPP-ED
Constantin Dumitriu from 10 December 2007	Romania		PSD	EPP-ED
Antoine Duquesne	Belgium	French Community	MR	ALDE
Michl Ebner	Italy	North-East	SVP	EPP-ED
Christian Ehler	Germany	Brandenburg	CDU	EPP-ED
Lena Ek	Sweden		C	ALDE
Saïd el Khadraoui	Belgium	Flemish Community	SP.A/Spirit	PES
James Elles	United Kingdom	South East England	Con	EPP-ED
Assunção Esteves	Portugal		PPD-PSD	EPP-ED
Edite Estrela	Portugal		PS	PES
Harald Ettl	Austria		SPÖ	PES
Jill Evans	United Kingdom	Wales	PC	Greens-EFA
Jonathan Evans	United Kingdom	Wales	Con	EPP-ED
Robert Evans	United Kingdom	London	Lab	PES
Hynek Fajmon	Czech Republic		ODS	EPP-ED
Richard Falbr	Czech Republic		CSSD	PES
Nigel Farage	United Kingdom	South East England	UKIP	IND/DEM
Göran Färm from 1 February 2007	Sweden		S	PES
Carlo Fatuzzo	Italy	North-West	PdP	EPP-ED
Claudio Fava	Italy	Islands	DS	PES
Szabolcs Fazakas	Hungary		MSZP	PES
Markus Ferber	Germany	Bavaria	CSU	EPP-ED
Emanuel Fernandes	Portugal		PS	PES
Fernando Fernández Martín	Spain		PP	EPP-ED
Francesco Ferrari from 5 July 2007	Italy	North-West	Olive Tree	ALDE
Anne Ferreira	France	Ile-de-France	PS	PES
Elisa Ferreira	Portugal		PS	PES
Ilda Figueiredo	Portugal		PCP	EUL/NGL
Roberto Fiore from 16 May 2008	Italy	Central	AS	NI
Christofer Fjellner	Sweden		M	EPP-ED
Věra Flasarová	Czech Republic		KSCM	EUL/NGL
Hélène Flautre	France	Nord-Ouest	Les Verts	Greens-EFA
Karl-Heinz Florenz	Germany	North Rhine-Westphalia	CDU	EPP-ED
Alessandro Foglietta	Italy	Central	AN	UEN
Hanna Foltyn-Kubicka	Poland		PiS	UEN
Nicole Fontaine	France	Ile-de-France	UMP	EPP-ED
Glyn Ford	United Kingdom	South West England	Lab	PES
Anna Fotyga	Poland	PM	PiS	UEN
Brigitte Fouré from 10 January 2008	France	Nord-Ouest	NC	EPP-ED
Janelly Fourtou	France	Massif central – Centre	UDF	ALDE
Carmen Fraga Estévez	Spain		PP	EPP-ED
Juan Fraile Cantón from 7 April 2008	Spain		PSOE	PES
Armando França from 15 October 2007	Portugal		PS	PES
Monica Frassoni	Italy	North-West	Verdi	Greens-EFA
Duarte Freitas	Portugal		PPD-PSD	EPP-ED
Ingo Friedrich	Germany	Bavaria	CSU	EPP-ED
Sorin Frunzăverde from 10 December 2007	Romania		PSD	EPP-ED
Daniel Petru Funeriu from 22 December 2008	Romania		PD-L	EPP-ED
Urszula Gacek from 6 December 2007	Poland	MP & SW	PO	EPP-ED
Michael Gahler	Germany	Hesse	CDU	EPP-ED
Kinga Gál	Hungary		FIDESZ/MPSZ	EPP-ED
Milan Gaľa	Slovakia		SDKU	EPP-ED
Gerardo Galeote Quecedo	Spain		PP	EPP-ED
Vicente Miguel Garcés Ramón	Spain		PSOE	PES
José García-Margallo y Marfil	Spain		PP	EPP-ED
Iratxe García Perez	Spain		PSOE	PES
Elisabetta Gardini from 30 May 2008	Italy	North-East	FI	EPP-ED
Giuseppe Gargani	Italy	Southern	FI	EPP-ED
Salvador Garriga Polledo	Spain		PP	EPP-ED
Patrick Gaubert	France	Ile-de-France	UMP	EPP-ED
Jean-Paul Gauzes	France	Nord-Ouest	UMP	EPP-ED
Jas Gawronski	Italy	North-West	FI	EPP-ED
Evelyne Gebhardt	Germany		SPD	PES
Eugenijus Gentvilas	Lithuania		LCS	ALDE
Georgios Georgiou from 1 October 2007	Greece		LA.O.S	IND/DEM
Lidia Geringer de Oedenberg	Poland	DS & OP	SLD/UP	PES
Roland Gewalt from 27 October 2005	Germany	Berlin	CDU	EPP-ED
Claire Gibault	France	Sud-Est	UDF	ALDE
Adam Gierek	Poland	SL	SLD/UP	PES
Maciej Giertych	Poland	SL	LPR	IND/DEM
Neena Gill	United Kingdom	West Midlands	Lab	PES
Monica Giuntini from 17 October 2008	Italy	Central	PD	PES
Ioannis Gklavakis	Greece		ND	EPP-ED
Norbert Glante	Germany		SPD	PES
Béla Glattfelder	Hungary		FIDESZ/MPSZ	EPP-ED
Robert Goebbels	Luxembourg		LSAP	PES
Lutz Goepel	Germany	Saxony	CDU	EPP-ED
Bogdan Golik	Poland	LD	Samoobrona	PES
Bruno Gollnisch	France	Est	FN	NI
Ana Maria Gomes	Portugal		PS	PES
Alfred Gomolka	Germany	Mecklenburg-Vorpommern	CDU	EPP-ED
Donata Maria Assunta Gottardi from 8 May 2006	Italy		Olive Tree	PES
Hélène Goudin	Sweden		Junilistan	IND/DEM
Genowefa Grabowska	Poland	SL	SDPL	PES
Dariusz Grabowski	Poland	MA	LPR	UEN
Vasco Graça Moura	Portugal		PPD-PSD	EPP-ED
Friedrich-Wilhelm Graefe zu Baringdorf	Germany		Die Grünen	Greens-EFA
Ingeborg Grässle	Germany	Baden-Württemberg	CDU	EPP-ED
Martí Grau i Segú from 7 April 2008	Spain		PSC	PES
Louis Grech	Malta		MLP	PES
Natalie Griesbeck	France	Est	UDF	ALDE
Lissy Gröner	Germany		SPD	PES
Matthias Groote from 26 October 2005	Germany		SPD	PES
Mathieu Grosch	Belgium	German community	CSP-EVP	EPP-ED
Françoise Grossetête	France	Sud-Est	UMP	EPP-ED
Ambroise Guellec	France	Ouest	UMP	EPP-ED
Pedro Guerreiro from 13 January 2005	Portugal		PCP	EUL/NGL
Umberto Guidoni	Italy	Central	PdCI	EUL/NGL
Zita Gurmai	Hungary		MSZP	PES
Cristina Gutiérrez-Cortines	Spain		PP	EPP-ED
Catherine Guy-Quint	France	Massif central – Centre	PS	PES
András Gyürk	Hungary		FIDESZ/MPSZ	EPP-ED
Fiona Hall	United Kingdom	North East England	Lib Dem	ALDE
Ioan Lucian Hămbăşan from 1 March 2009	Romania		PD-L	EPP-ED
David Hammerstein Mintz	Spain		Los Verdes	Greens-EFA
Benoît Hamon	France	Est	PS	PES
Małgorzata Handzlik	Poland	SL	PO	EPP-ED
Daniel Hannan	United Kingdom	South East England	Con	EPP-ED
Klaus Hänsch	Germany		SPD	PES
Gábor Harangozó	Hungary		MSZP	PES
Malcolm Harbour	United Kingdom	West Midlands	Con	EPP-ED
Marian Harkin	Republic of Ireland	North-West		ALDE
Rebecca Harms	Germany		Die Grünen	Greens-EFA
Joel Hasse Ferreira from 12 March 2005	Portugal		PS	PES
Satu Hassi	Finland		Vihreät	Greens-EFA
Jutta Haug	Germany		SPD	PES
Adeline Hazan	France	Est	PS	PES
Chris Heaton-Harris	United Kingdom	East Midlands	Con	EPP-ED
Anna Hedh	Sweden		S	PES
Gyula Hegyi	Hungary		MSZP	PES
Roger Helmer	United Kingdom	East Midlands	Con	EPP-ED
Jacky Henin	France	Nord-Ouest	PCF	EUL/NGL
Erna Hennicot-Schoepges	Luxembourg		CSV	EPP-ED
Jeanine Hennis-Plasschaert	Netherlands		VVD	ALDE
Edit Herczog	Hungary		MSZP	PES
María Esther Herranz García	Spain		PP	EPP-ED
Luis Herrero-Tejedor Algar	Spain		PP	EPP-ED
Ruth Hieronymi	Germany	North Rhine-Westphalia	CDU	EPP-ED
Jim Higgins	Republic of Ireland	North-West	FG	EPP-ED
Gunnar Hökmark	Sweden		M	EPP-ED
Jens Holm from 27 September 2006	Sweden		V	EUL/NGL
Krzysztof Hołowczyc from 6 December 2007	Poland	PD & WM	PO	EPP-ED
Mary Honeyball	United Kingdom	London	Lab	PES
Karsten Friedrich Hoppenstedt	Germany	Lower Saxony	CDU	EPP-ED
Milan Horáček	Germany		Die Grünen	Greens-EFA
Richard Howitt	United Kingdom	East of England	Lab	PES
Ján Hudacký	Slovakia		KDH	EPP-ED
Ian Hudghton	United Kingdom	Scotland	SNP	Greens-EFA
Stephen Hughes	United Kingdom	North East England	Lab	PES
Filiz Husmenova from 1 January 2007	Bulgaria		DPS	ALDE
Alain Hutchinson	Belgium	French Community	PS	PES
Jana Hybášková	Czech Republic		ED	EPP-ED
Anna Ibrisagic	Sweden		M	EPP-ED
Sophia Helena in 't Veld	Netherlands		D66	ALDE
Mikel Irujo Amezaga from 19 June 2007	Spain		EA	Greens-EFA
Marie-Anne Isler-Béguin	France	Est	Les Verts	Greens-EFA
Ville Itälä	Finland		KOK	EPP-ED
Carlos José Iturgaiz Angulo	Spain		PP	EPP-ED
Anneli Jäätteenmäki	Finland		KESK	ALDE
Caroline Jackson	United Kingdom	South West England	Con	EPP-ED
Lily Jacobs from 4 September 2007	Netherlands		PvdA	PES
Stanisław Jałowiecki	Poland	DS & OP	PO	EPP-ED
Mieczysław Janowski	Poland	PK	PiS	UEN
Lívia Járóka	Hungary		FIDESZ/MPSZ	EPP-ED
Georg Jarzembowski	Germany	Hamburg	CDU	EPP-ED
Elisabeth Jeggle	Germany	Baden-Württemberg	CDU	EPP-ED
Rumiana Jeleva from May 2007	Bulgaria		GERB	EPP-ED
Anne Elisabet Jensen	Denmark		V	ALDE
Pierre Jonckheer	Belgium	French Community	Ecolo	Greens-EFA
Karin Jöns	Germany		SPD	PES
Romana Jordan Cizelj	Slovenia		SDS	EPP-ED
Dan Jørgensen	Denmark		SD	PES
Madeleine de Grandmaison from 9 November 2007	France	outre-mer	RDM	EUL/NGL
Ona Juknevičienė	Lithuania		DP	ALDE
Aurelio Juri from 7 November 2008	Slovenia		SD	PES
Jelko Kacin	Slovenia		LDS/DeSUS	ALDE
Filip Kaczmarek	Poland	WP	PO	EPP-ED
Gisela Kallenbach	Germany		Die Grünen	Greens-EFA
Syed Kamall from 12 May 2005	United Kingdom	London	Con	EPP-ED
Othmar Karas	Austria		ÖVP	EPP-ED
Saj Karim	United Kingdom	North West England	Con	EPP-ED
Ioannis Kasoulides	Cyprus		DISY	EPP-ED
Martin Kastler from 4 December 2008	Germany	Bavaria	CSU	EPP-ED
Sylvia-Yvonne Kaufmann	Germany		PDS	EUL/NGL
Metin Kazak from 6 June 2007	Bulgaria		DPS	ALDE
Tunne Kelam	Estonia		IL	EPP-ED
Robert Kilroy-Silk	United Kingdom	East Midlands	Veritas	NI
Heinz Kindermann	Germany		SPD	PES
Glenys Kinnock	United Kingdom	Wales	Lab	PES
Evgeni Kirilov from 1 January 2007	Bulgaria		KzB	PES
Timothy Kirkhope	United Kingdom	Yorkshire and the Humber	Con	EPP-ED
Ewa Klamt	Germany	Lower Saxony	CDU	EPP-ED
Christa Klaß	Germany	Rhineland-Palatinate	CDU	EPP-ED
Wolf Klinz	Germany		FDP	ALDE
Roger Knapman	United Kingdom	South West England	UKIP	IND/DEM
Dieter-Lebrecht Koch	Germany	Thuringia	CDU	EPP-ED
Silvana Koch-Mehrin	Germany		FDP	ALDE
Jaromír Kohlíček	Czech Republic		KSCM	EUL/NGL
Christoph Werner Konrad	Germany	North Rhine-Westphalia	CDU	EPP-ED
Maria Eleni Koppa from 1 October 2007	Greece		PASOK	PES
Eija-Riitta Korhola	Finland		KOK	EPP-ED
Magda Kósáné Kovács	Hungary		MSZP	PES
Miloš Koterec	Slovakia		SMER	PES
Sergej Kozlík	Slovakia		LS – HZDS	NI
Holger Krahmer	Germany		FDP	ALDE
Guntars Krasts	Latvia		TB/LNNK	UEN
Rodi Kratsa-Tsagaropoulou	Greece		ND	EPP-ED
Konstanze Krehl	Germany		SPD	PES
Wolfgang Kreissl-Doerfler	Germany		SPD	PES
Girts Valdis Kristovskis	Latvia		TB/LNNK	UEN
Urszula Krupa	Poland	LD	LPR	IND/DEM
Wiesław Kuc	Poland	LU	Samoobrona	UEN
Helmut Kuhne	Germany		SPD	PES
Jan Kułakowski	Poland	WP	UW	ALDE
Aldis Kuškis	Latvia		JL	EPP-ED
Sepp Kusstatscher	Italy	North-East	Verdi	Greens-EFA
Zbigniew Kuźmiuk	Poland	MA	PSL "Piast"	UEN
Joost Lagendijk	Netherlands		GroenLinks	Greens-EFA
André Laignel	France	Massif central – Centre	PS	PES
Alain Lamassoure	France	Sud-Ouest	UMP	EPP-ED
Jean Lambert	United Kingdom	London	Greens (E&W)	Greens-EFA
Stavros Lambrinidis	Greece		PASOK	PES
Alexander Lambsdorff Graf	Germany		FDP	ALDE
Vytautas Landsbergis	Lithuania		TS-LK	EPP-ED
Carl Lang	France	Nord-Ouest	FN	NI
Werner Langen	Germany	Rhineland-Palatinate	CDU	EPP-ED
Raymond Langendries	Belgium	French Community	CDH	EPP-ED
Anne Laperrouze	France	Sud-Ouest	UDF	ALDE
Kurt Joachim Lauk	Germany	Baden-Württemberg	CDU	EPP-ED
Vincenzo Lavarra from 24 May 2005	Italy	North-West	DS	PES
Henrik Lax	Finland		SFP	ALDE
Stéphane Le Foll	France	Ouest	PS	PES
Jean-Marie Le Pen	France	Sud-Est	FN	NI
Marine Le Pen	France	Ile-de-France	FN	NI
Fernand Le Rachinel from 22 October 2004	France	Nord-Ouest	FN	NI
Johannes Lebech from 29 November 2007	Denmark		RV	ALDE
Kurt Lechner	Germany	Rhineland-Palatinate	CDU	EPP-ED
Bernard Lehideux	France	Ile-de-France	UDF	ALDE
Klaus-Heiner Lehne	Germany	North Rhine-Westphalia	CDU	EPP-ED
Lasse Lehtinen	Finland		SDP	PES
Jörg Leichtfried	Austria		SPÖ	PES
Roselyne Lefrançois from 4 July 2007	France	Ouest	PS	PES
Jo Leinen	Germany		SPD	PES
Innocenzo Leontini from 23 June 2008	Italy	Islands	FI	EPP-ED
Katalin Lévai	Hungary		MSZP	PES
Janusz Lewandowski	Poland	PM	PO	EPP-ED
Bogusław Liberadzki	Poland	LB & ZP	SLD/UP	PES
Marcin Libicki	Poland	WP	PiS	UEN
Eva Lichtenberger	Austria		Grünen	Greens-EFA
Marie-Noëlle Lienemann	France	Nord-Ouest	PS	PES
Liene Liepiņa from 19 March 2009	Latvia		JL	EPP-ED
Peter Liese	Germany	North Rhine-Westphalia	CDU	EPP-ED
Kartika Liotard	Netherlands		SP	EUL/NGL
Alain Lipietz	France	Ile-de-France	Les Verts	Greens-EFA
Pia Elda Locatelli	Italy	North-West	SDI	PES
Eleonora Lo Curto from 24 July 2008	Italy	Islands	FI	EPP-ED
Antonio López-Istúriz White	Spain		PP	EPP-ED
Andrea Losco from 8 May 2006	Italy		Olive Tree	ALDE
Patrick Louis	France	Sud-Est	MPF	IND/DEM
Caroline Lucas	United Kingdom	South East England	Greens (E&W)	Greens-EFA
Sarah Ludford	United Kingdom	London	Lib Dem	ALDE
Astrid Lulling	Luxembourg		CSV	EPP-ED
Nils Lundgren	Sweden		Junilistan	IND/DEM
Florencio Luque Aguilar from 7 April 2008	Spain		PP	EPP-ED
Liz Lynne	United Kingdom	West Midlands	Lib Dem	ALDE
Marusya Ivanova Lyubcheva from 1 January 2007	Bulgaria		KzB	PES
Jules Maaten	Netherlands		VVD	ALDE
Jamila Madeira	Portugal		PS	PES
Eugenijus Maldeikis from 18 May 2006	Lithuania		TiT	UEN
Toine Manders	Netherlands		VVD	ALDE
Ramona Nicole Mănescu from 10 December 2007	Romania		PNL	ALDE
Vladimír Maňka	Slovakia		SMER	PES
Erika Mann	Germany		SPD	PES
Thomas Mann	Germany	Hesse	CDU	EPP-ED
Adrian Manole from 22 December 2008	Romania		PD-L	EPP-ED
Marian-Jean Marinescu from 1 January 2007	Romania		PD	EPP-ED
Catiuscia Marini from 16 May 2008	Italy	Central	PD	PES
Helmuth Markov	Germany		PDS	EUL/NGL
Sérgio Marques	Portugal		PPD-PSD	EPP-ED
Maria Martens	Netherlands		CDA	EPP-ED
David Martin	United Kingdom	Scotland	Lab	PES
Hans-Peter Martin	Austria		Liste Martin	NI
Jean-Claude Martinez	France	Sud-Ouest	FN	NI
Miguel Angel Martínez Martínez	Spain		PSOE	PES
Jan Masiel	Poland	WP	Samoobrona	UEN
Antonio Masip Hidalgo	Spain		PSOE	PES
Jiří Maštálka	Czech Republic		KSCM	EUL/NGL
Véronique Mathieu	France	Est	UMP	EPP-ED
Marios Matsakis	Cyprus		DIKO	ALDE
Yiannakis Matsis	Cyprus		GTE	EPP-ED
Maria Matsouka	Greece		PASOK	PES
Iosif Matula from 22 December 2008	Romania		PD-L	EPP-ED
Mario Mauro	Italy	North-West	FI	EPP-ED
Manolis Mavrommatis	Greece		ND	EPP-ED
Hans-Peter Mayer	Germany	Lower Saxony	CDU	EPP-ED
Jaime María Mayor Oreja	Spain		PP	EPP-ED
Linda McAvan	United Kingdom	Yorkshire and the Humber	Lab	PES
Arlene McCarthy	United Kingdom	North West England	Lab	PES
Mary Lou McDonald	Republic of Ireland	Dublin	SF	EUL/NGL
Mairead McGuinness	Republic of Ireland	East	FG	EPP-ED
Edward McMillan-Scott	United Kingdom	Yorkshire and the Humber	Con	EPP-ED
Manuel Medina Ortega	Spain		PSOE	PES
Erik Meijer	Netherlands		SP	EUL/NGL
Íñigo Méndez de Vigo	Spain		PP	EPP-ED
Emilio Menéndez	Spain		PSOE	PES
Willy Meyer Pleite	Spain		IU	EUL/NGL
Rosa Miguélez Ramos	Spain		PSOE	PES
Marianne Mikko	Estonia		SDE	PES
Miroslav Mikolášik	Slovakia		KDH	EPP-ED
Francisco José Millán Mon	Spain		PP	EPP-ED
Gay Mitchell	Republic of Ireland	Dublin	FG	EPP-ED
Nickolay Mladenov from 6 June 2007	Bulgaria		GERB	EPP-ED
Viktória Mohácsi from 29 November 2004	Hungary		SzDSz	ALDE
Andreas Mölzer	Austria		FPÖ	NI
Claude Moraes	United Kingdom	London	Lab	PES
Javier Moreno Sanchez	Spain		PSOE	PES
Eluned Morgan	United Kingdom	Wales	Lab	PES
Luisa Morgantini	Italy	Central or Islands	RC	EUL/NGL
Philippe Morillon	France	Ouest	UDF	ALDE
Elisabeth Morin from 24 May 2007	France	Ouest	UMP	EPP-ED
Ashley Mote	United Kingdom	South East England	UKIP	NI
*Jan Mulder	Netherlands		VVD	ALDE
Roberto Musacchio	Italy	North-East	RC	EUL/NGL
Cristiana Muscardini	Italy	North-West	AN	UEN
Francesco Musotto	Italy	Islands	FI	EPP-ED
Antonio Mussa from 4 November 2008	Italy	North-West	AN	UEN
Sebastiano (Nello) Musumeci	Italy	Islands	Sicilian Alliance	UEN
Riitta Myller	Finland		SDP	PES
Pasqualina Napoletano	Italy	Central	DS	PES
Juan Andrés Naranjo Escobar from 7 April 2008	Spain		PP	EPP-ED
Hartmut Nassauer	Germany	Hesse	CDU	EPP-ED
Mike Nattrass	United Kingdom	West Midlands	UKIP	IND/DEM
Alexandru Nazare from 22 December 2008	Romania		PD-L	EPP-ED
Catherine Neris from 4 July 2007	France	outre-mer	PS	PES
Bill Newton Dunn	United Kingdom	East Midlands	Lib Dem	ALDE
Annemie Neyts-Uyttebroeck	Belgium	Flemish Community	VLD/Vivant	ALDE
Emma Nicholson	United Kingdom	South East England	Lib Dem	ALDE
Jim Nicholson	United Kingdom	Northern Ireland	UUP	EPP-ED
Rareş-Lucian Niculescu from 10 December 2007	Romania		PSD	EPP-ED
Angelika Niebler	Germany	Bavaria	CSU	EPP-ED
Ljudmila Novak	Slovenia		NSi	EPP-ED
Seán Ó Neachtain	Republic of Ireland	North-West	FF	UEN
Raimon Obiols	Spain		PSOE	PES
Vural Öger	Germany		SPD	PES
Péter Olajos	Hungary		MDF	EPP-ED
Jan Olbrycht	Poland	SL	PO	EPP-ED
Gérard Onesta	France	Sud-Ouest	Les Verts	Greens-EFA
Janusz Onyszkiewicz	Poland	MP & SW	UW	ALDE
Ria Oomen-Ruijten	Netherlands		CDA	EPP-ED
Josu Ortuondo Larrea	Spain		PNV	ALDE
Csaba Őry	Hungary		FIDESZ/MPSZ	EPP-ED
Miroslav Ouzký	Czech Republic		ODS	EPP-ED
Siiri Oviir	Estonia		K	ALDE
Cem Özdemir	Germany		Die Grünen	Greens-EFA
Reino Paasilinna	Finland		SDP	PES
Doris Pack	Germany	Saarland	CDU	EPP-ED
Thanasis Pafilis	Greece		KKE	EUL/NGL
Maria Grazia Pagano from 17 June 2008	Italy	Southern	PD	PES
Justas Vincas Paleckis	Lithuania		LSDP	PES
Marie Panayotopoulos-Cassiotou	Greece		ND	EPP-ED
Vladko Panayotov from 6 June 2007	Bulgaria		DPS	ALDE
Marco Pannella	Italy	North-East or North-West	Lista Bonino	ALDE
Pier Antonio Panzeri	Italy	North-West	DS	PES
Dimitrios Papadimoulis	Greece		SYN	EUL/NGL
Atanas Atanassov Paparizov from 1 January 2007	Bulgaria		KzB	PES
Georgios Papastamkos	Greece		ND	EPP-ED
Neil Parish	United Kingdom	South West England	Con	EPP-ED
Ioan Mircea Paşcu from 1 January 2007	Romania		PSD	PES
Aldo Patriciello from 18 May 2006	Italy		UDC	EPP-ED
Béatrice Patrie	France	Sud-Ouest	PS	PES
Vincent Peillon	France	Nord-Ouest	PS	PES
Bogdan Pęk	Poland	MP & SW	LPR	UEN
Lojze Peterle	Slovenia		NSi	EPP-ED
Maria Petre from 1 January 2007	Romania		PD	EPP-ED
Tobias Pflüger	Germany		PDS	EUL/NGL
Markus Pieper	Germany	North Rhine-Westphalia	CDU	EPP-ED
Sirpa Pietikäinen from 4 April 2008	Finland		KOK	EPP-ED
Rihards Pīks	Latvia		TP	EPP-ED
João de Deus Pinheiro	Portugal		PPD-PSD	EPP-ED
Józef Pinior	Poland	DS & OP	SDPL	PES
Mirosław Piotrowski	Poland	LU	LPR	UEN
Umberto Pirilli	Italy	Southern	AN	UEN
Hubert Pirker from 1 February 2006	Austria		ÖVP	EPP-ED
Paweł Piskorski	Poland	Warsaw	PO	ALDE
Giovanni Pittella	Italy	Southern	DS	PES
Francisca Pleguezuelos Aguilar	Spain		PSOE	PES
Zita Pleštinská	Slovakia		SDKU	EPP-ED
Rovana Plumb from 2 May 2007	Romania		PSD	PES
Guido Podestà	Italy	North-West	FI	EPP-ED
Anni Podimata from 1 October 2007	Greece		PASOK	PES
Zdzisław Podkański	Poland	LU	PSL "Piast"	UEN
Hans-Gert Poettering	Germany	Lower Saxony	CDU	EPP-ED
Samuli Pohjamo from 23 April 2007	Finland		KESK	ALDE
Bernard Poignant	France	Ouest	PS	PES
Lydie Polfer	Luxembourg		DP	ALDE
José Javier Pomés Ruiz	Spain		PP	EPP-ED
Nicolae Vlad Popa from 10 December 2007	Romania		PLD	ALDE
Miguel Portas	Portugal		BE	EUL/NGL
Horst Posdorf from 24 October 2005	Germany	North Rhine-Westphalia	CDU	EPP-ED
Bernd Posselt	Germany	Bavaria	CSU	EPP-ED
Christa Prets	Austria		SPÖ	PES
Pierre Pribetich from 4 July 2007	France	Est	PS	PES
Vittorio Prodi	Italy	North-East	Margherita	ALDE
Jacek Protasiewicz	Poland	DS & OP	PO	EPP-ED
John Purvis	United Kingdom	Scotland	Con	EPP-ED
Luis Queiró	Portugal		CDS-PP	EPP-ED
Godelieve Quisthoudt-Rowohl	Germany	Lower Saxony	CDU	EPP-ED
Reinhard Rack	Austria		ÖVP	EPP-ED
Biliana Ilieva Raeva from 6 June 2007	Bulgaria		NDSV	ALDE
Miloslav Ransdorf	Czech Republic		KSCM	EUL/NGL
Bernhard Rapkay	Germany		SPD	PES
Poul Nyrup Rasmussen	Denmark		SD	PES
Vladimír Remek	Czech Republic		KSCM	EUL/NGL
Karin Resetarits	Austria		Liberal Forum	ALDE
Herbert Reul	Germany	North Rhine-Westphalia	CDU	EPP-ED
José Ribeiro e Castro	Portugal		CDS-PP	EPP-ED
Teresa Riera Madurell	Spain		PSOE	PES
Frédérique Ries	Belgium	French Community	MR	ALDE
Karin Riis-Jørgensen	Denmark		V	ALDE
Giovanni Rivera from 24 May 2005	Italy	Southern	Olive Tree	NI
Marco Rizzo	Italy	North-West	PdCI	EUL/NGL
Giovanni Robusti from 30 May 2008	Italy	North-West	Ind	UEN
Ulrike Rodust from 29 August 2008	Germany		SPD	PES
Bogusław Rogalski	Poland	PD & WM	LPR	UEN
Zuzana Roithová	Czech Republic		KDU-CSL	EPP-ED
Luca Romagnoli	Italy	Southern	FT	NI
Raül Romeva	Spain		IC/V	Greens-EFA
Dariusz Rosati	Poland	Warsaw	SDPL	PES
Wojciech Roszkowski	Poland	SL	PiS	UEN
Dagmar Roth-Behrendt	Germany		SPD	PES
Mechtild Rothe	Germany		SPD	PES
Libor Rouček	Czech Republic		CSSD	PES
Martine Roure	France	Sud-Est	PS	PES
Christian Rovsing	Denmark		KF	EPP-ED
Paul Rübig	Austria		ÖVP	EPP-ED
Heide Rühle	Germany		Die Grünen	Greens-EFA
Leopold Rutowicz	Poland	MP & SW	Samoobrona	UEN
Eoin Ryan	Republic of Ireland	Dublin	FF	UEN
Guido Sacconi	Italy	Central	DS	PES
Tokia Saïfi	France	Nord-Ouest	UMP	EPP-ED
Aloyzas Sakalas	Lithuania		LSDP	PES
Katrin Saks from 9 October 2006	Estonia		SDE	PES
José Salafranca Sánchez-Neyra	Spain		PP	EPP-ED
Antolín Sánchez Presedo	Spain		PSOE	PES
Michele Santoro	Italy	Southern	Olive Tree	PES
Salvador Domingo Sanz Palacio from 7 April 2008	Spain		PP	EPP-ED
Sebastiano Sanzarello from 22 May 2008	Italy	Islands	FI	EPP-ED
Daciana Octavia Sârbu from 1 January 2007	Romania		PSD	PES
Amalia Sartori	Italy	North-East	FI	EPP-ED
Jacek Saryusz-Wolski	Poland	LD	PO	EPP-ED
Gilles Savary	France	Ile-de-France	PS	PES
Toomas Savi	Estonia		ER	ALDE
Christel Schaldemose from 15 October 2006	Denmark		SD	PES
Pierre Schapira	France	Ile-de-France	PS	PES
Lydia Schenardi	France	Sud-Est	FN	NI
Agnes Schierhuber	Austria		ÖVP	EPP-ED
Margaritis Schinas from 1 October 2007	Greece		ND	EPP-ED
Carl Schlyter	Sweden		Mp	Greens-EFA
Frithjof Schmidt	Germany		Die Grünen	Greens-EFA
Olle Schmidt from 19 October 2006	Sweden		Fp	ALDE
Ingo Schmitt	Germany	Berlin	CDU	EPP-ED
Pál Schmitt	Hungary		FIDESZ/MPSZ	EPP-ED
Horst Schnellhardt	Germany	Saxony-Anhalt	CDU	EPP-ED
György Schöpflin	Hungary		FIDESZ/MPSZ	EPP-ED
Juergen Schröder	Germany	Saxony	CDU	EPP-ED
Elisabeth Schroedter	Germany		Die Grünen	Greens-EFA
Martin Schulz	Germany		SPD	PES
Willem Schuth	Germany		FDP	ALDE
Andreas Schwab	Germany	Baden-Württemberg	CDU	EPP-ED
Richard Seeber	Austria		ÖVP	EPP-ED
Inger Segelström	Sweden		S	PES
Esko Seppänen	Finland		VAS	EUL/NGL
Adrian Severin from 1 January 2007	Romania		PSD	PES
Czesław Siekierski	Poland	MP & SW	PSL	EPP-ED
Eva-Riitta Siitonen from 1 January 2009	Finland		KOK	EPP-ED
José Silva Peneda	Portugal		PPD-PSD	EPP-ED
Brian Simpson from 28 August 2006	United Kingdom	North West England	Lab	PES
Kathy Sinnott	Republic of Ireland	South		IND/DEM
Marek Siwiec	Poland	WP	SLD/UP	PES
Peter Skinner	United Kingdom	South East England	Lab	PES
Nina Škottová	Czech Republic		ODS	EPP-ED
Alyn Smith	United Kingdom	Scotland	SNP	Greens-EFA
Csaba Sógor from 10 December 2007	Romania		UDMR	EPP-ED
Renate Sommer	Germany	North Rhine-Westphalia	CDU	EPP-ED
Søren Bo Søndergaard from 1 January 2007	Denmark		Folk B.	EUL/NGL
Bogusław Sonik	Poland	MP & SW	PO	EPP-ED
María Sornosa Martinez	Spain		PSOE	PES
Bernard Soulage from 1 February 2009	France	Sud-Est	PS	PES
Sérgio Sousa Pinto	Portugal		PS	PES
Jean Spautz	Luxembourg		CSV	EPP-ED
Francesco Speroni	Italy	North-West	LN	UEN
Bart Staes	Belgium	Flemish Community	Groen!	Greens-EFA
Grażyna Staniszewska	Poland	SL	UW	ALDE
Margarita Starkevičiūtė	Lithuania		LCS	ALDE
Peter Šťastný	Slovakia		SDKU	EPP-ED
Gabriele Stauner from 18 January 2006	Germany		CSU	EPP-ED
Petya Stavreva Stavreva from 6 June 2007	Bulgaria		GERB	EPP-ED
Ursula Stenzel	Austria		ÖVP	EPP-ED
Dirk Sterckx	Belgium	Flemish Community	VLD/Vivant	ALDE
Struan Stevenson	United Kingdom	Scotland	Con	EPP-ED
Catherine Stihler	United Kingdom	Scotland	Lab	PES
Theodor Dumitru Stolojan from 10 December 2007	Romania		PLD	ALDE
Dimitar Stoyanov from 1 January 2007	Bulgaria		NSA	NI
Ulrich Stockmann	Germany		SPD	PES
Ivo Strejček	Czech Republic		ODS	EPP-ED
Daniel Stroz	Czech Republic		KSCM	EUL/NGL
Robert Sturdy	United Kingdom	East of England	Con	EPP-ED
Margie Sudre	France	outre-mer	UMP	EPP-ED
David Sumberg	United Kingdom	North West England	Con	EPP-ED
László Surján	Hungary		FIDESZ/MPSZ	EPP-ED
Gianluca Susta from 18 May 2006	Italy		Margherita	ALDE
Eva-Britt Svensson	Sweden		V	EUL/NGL
Hannes Swoboda	Austria		SPÖ	PES
József Szájer	Hungary		FIDESZ/MPSZ	EPP-ED
Andrzej Szejna	Poland	MP & SW	SLD/UP	PES
István Szent-Iványi	Hungary		SzDSz	ALDE
Konrad Szymański	Poland	DS & OP	PiS	UEN
Csaba Sándor Tabajdi	Hungary		MSZP	PES
Hannu Takkula	Finland		KESK	ALDE
Charles Tannock	United Kingdom	London	Con	EPP-ED
Marc Tarabella from 9 August 2004	Belgium	French Community	PS	PES
Andres Tarand	Estonia		SDE	PES
Salvatore Tatarella	Italy	Southern	AN	UEN
Michel Teychenné from 6 October 2008	France	Sud-Ouest	PS	PES
Britta Thomsen	Denmark		SD	PES
Marianne Thyssen	Belgium	Flemish Community	CD&V	EPP-ED
Silvia Adriana Ţicău from 1 January 2007	Romania		PSD	PES
Jeffrey Titford	United Kingdom	East of England	UKIP	IND/DEM
Gary Titley	United Kingdom	North West England	Lab	PES
Patrizia Toia	Italy	North-West	Margherita	ALDE
László Tőkés from 10 December 2007	Romania		Ind	NI
Ewa Tomaszewska from 30 August 2007	Poland	Warsaw	PiS	UEN
Witold Tomczak	Poland	WP	LPR	IND/DEM
Jacques Toubon	France	Ile-de-France	UMP	EPP-ED
Giorgos Toussas	Greece		KKE	EUL/NGL
Antonios Trakatellis	Greece		ND	EPP-ED
Catherine Trautmann	France	Est	PS	PES
Kyriacos Triantaphyllides	Cyprus		AKEL	EUL/NGL
Helga Trüpel	Germany		Die Grünen	Greens-EFA
Claude Turmes	Luxembourg		Déi Gréng	Greens-EFA
Evangelia Tzampazi	Greece		PASOK	PES
Feleknas Uca	Germany		PDS	EUL/NGL
Thomas Ulmer	Germany	Baden-Württemberg	CDU	EPP-ED
Vladimir Urutchev from 6 June 2007	Bulgaria		GERB	EPP-ED
Inese Vaidere	Latvia		TB/LNNK	UEN
Nikos Vakalis	Greece		ND	EPP-ED
Adina Ioana Vălean from 1 January 2007	Romania		PNL	ALDE
Joan Vallvé from 8 May 2009	Spain		CiU (CDC)	ALDE
Paul van Buitenen	Netherlands		ET	Greens-EFA
Ieke van den Burg	Netherlands		PvdA	PES
Anne Van Lancker	Belgium	Flemish Community	SP.A	PES
Johan Van Hecke	Belgium	Flemish Community	VLD/Vivant	ALDE
Lambert van Nistelrooij	Netherlands		CDA	EPP-ED
Geoffrey van Orden	United Kingdom	East of England	Con	EPP-ED
Frans Vanhecke	Belgium	Flemish Community	VlB	NI
Ioannis Varvitsiotis	Greece		ND	EPP-ED
Ari Vatanen	France	Sud-Est	UMP	EPP-ED
Yannick Vaugrenard	France	Ouest	PS	PES
Armando Veneto from 18 May 2006	Italy		AP-UDEUR	EPP-ED
Riccardo Ventre	Italy	Southern	FI	EPP-ED
Donato Tommaso Veraldi from 18 May 2006	Italy		Margherita	ALDE
Bernadette Vergnaud	France	Ouest	PS	PES
Marcello Vernola	Italy	Southern	FI	EPP-ED
Alejo Vidal-Quadras Roca	Spain		PP	EPP-ED
Kristian Vigenin from 1 January 2007	Bulgaria		KzB	PES
Kyösti Virrankoski	Finland		KESK	ALDE
Cornelis Visser from 17 October 2007	Netherlands		CDA	EPP-ED
Oldrich Vlasák	Czech Republic		ODS	EPP-ED
Dominique Vlasto	France	Sud-Est	UMP	EPP-ED
Johannes Voggenhuber	Austria		Grünen	Greens-EFA
Karl von Wogau	Germany	Baden-Württemberg	CDU	EPP-ED
Sahra Wagenknecht	Germany		PDS	EUL/NGL
Diana Wallis	United Kingdom	Yorkshire and the Humber	Lib Dem	ALDE
Ralf Walter	Germany		SPD	PES
Graham Watson	United Kingdom	South West England	Lib Dem	ALDE
Henri Weber	France	Nord-Ouest	PS	PES
Manfred Weber	Germany	Bavaria	CSU	EPP-ED
Renate Weber from 10 December 2007	Romania		PNL	ALDE
Barbara Weiler	Germany		SPD	PES
Anja Weisgerber	Germany	Bavaria	CSU	EPP-ED
Åsa Westlund	Sweden		S	PES
John Whittaker	United Kingdom	North West England	UKIP	IND/DEM
Rainer Wieland	Germany	Baden-Württemberg	CDU	EPP-ED
Andrzej Wielowieyski from 26 August 2008	Poland		PD	ALDE
Jan Marinus Wiersma	Netherlands		PvdA	PES
Anders Wijkman	Sweden		KD	EPP-ED
Glenis Willmott	United Kingdom	East Midlands	Labour	PES
Iuliu Winkler from 10 December 2007	Romania		UDMR	EPP-ED
Tom Wise	United Kingdom	East of England	UKIP	IND/DEM
Lars Wohlin	Sweden		Junilistan	IND/DEM
Bernard Piotr Wojciechowski from 26 October 2005	Poland		LPR	NI
Janusz Wojciechowski	Poland	LD	PSL "Piast"	UEN
Corien Wortmann-Kool	Netherlands		CDA	EPP-ED
Joachim Wuermeling	Germany	Bavaria	CSU	EPP-ED
Francis Wurtz	France	Ile-de-France	PCF	EUL/NGL
Luis Yañez-Barnuevo García	Spain		PSOE	PES
Iliana Malinova Iotova from 6 June 2007	Bulgaria		PES	PES
Anna Záborská	Slovakia		KDH	EPP-ED
Jan Zahradil	Czech Republic		ODS	EPP-ED
Zbigniew Zaleski	Poland	LU	PO	EPP-ED
Mauro Zani	Italy	North-East	DS	PES
Iva Zanicchi from 16 May 2008	Italy	North-West	FI	EPP-ED
Andrzej Tomasz Zapałowski from 12 July 2005	Poland	PM	LPR	UEN
Stefano Zappala'	Italy	Central	FI	EPP-ED
Tomáš Zatloukal	Czech Republic		SNK	EPP-ED
Tatjana Ždanoka	Latvia		PCTVL	Greens-EFA
Dushana Panayotova Zdravkova from 6 June 2007	Bulgaria		GERB	EPP-ED
Vladimir Železný	Czech Republic			IND/DEM
Rumyana Ruseva Zheleva from 6 June 2007	Bulgaria		GERB	EPP-ED
Jozef Zieleniec	Czech Republic		SNK	EPP-ED
Roberts Zīle	Latvia		TB/LNNK	UEN
Gabi Zimmer	Germany		PDS	EUL/NGL
Jürgen Zimmerling from 6 July 2005	Germany	North Rhine-Westphalia	CDU	EPP-ED
Jaroslav Zvěřina	Czech Republic		ODS	EPP-ED
Tadeusz Zwiefka	Poland	KP	PO	EPP-ED

== Outgoing members during the session ==
Date	Name	Country	Party	Group	Notes
1 October 2004	Chantal Simonot	France	FN	NI	Replaced by Fernand Le Rachinel
28 October 2004	Gábor Demszky	Hungary	SzDSz	ALDE	Resigned to remain Mayor of Budapest; Replaced by Viktória Mohácsi
11 January 2005	Sérgio Ribeiro	Portugal	PCP	EUL/NGL	Replaced by Pedro Guerreiro
11 March 2005	António Costa	Portugal	PS	PES	Replaced by Joel Hasse Ferreira
1 May 2005	Ottaviano Del Turco	Italy	SDI	PES	Elected President of Abruzzo; Replaced by Giovanni Rivera
11 May 2005	Theresa Villiers	United Kingdom	Con	EPP-ED	Elected UK Member of Parliament; Replaced by Syed Kamall
11 May 2005	Chris Huhne	United Kingdom	Lib Dem	ALDE	Elected UK Member of Parliament; Replaced by Sharon Bowles
15 May 2005	Antonio De Poli	Italy	UDC	EPP-ED	Replaced by Iles Braghetto
24 May 2005	Mercedes Bresso	Italy	DS	PES	Replaced by Vincenzo Lavarra
2 June 2005	Brice Hortefeux	France	UMP	EPP-ED	Replaced by Jean-Pierre Audy
26 June 2005	Filip Adwent	Poland	LPR	IND/DEM	Replaced by Andrzej Tomasz Zapałowski
29 June 2005	Armin Laschet	Germany	CDU	EPP-ED	Replaced by Jürgen Zimmerling
16 October 2005	Wojciech Wierzejski	Poland	LPR	IND/DEM	Replaced by Bernard Piotr Wojciechowski
8 October 2005	Jürgen Zimmerling	Germany	CDU	EPP-ED	from 6 July 2005; Replaced by Horst Posdorf
17 October 2005	Garrelt Duin	Germany	SPD	PES	Elected to Bundestag; Replaced by Matthias Groote
17 October 2005	Ingo Schmitt	Germany	CDU	EPP-ED	Elected to Bundestag; Replaced by Roland Gewalt
13 November 2005	Michele Santoro	Italy	Olive Tree	PES	Replaced by Giovanni Procacci
22 November 2005	Anna Fotyga	Poland	PiS	UEN	Replaced by Hanna Foltyn-Kubicka
18 December 2005	Joachim Wuermeling	Germany	CSU	EPP-ED	Replaced by Gabriele Stauner
31 December 2005	Phillip Whitehead	United Kingdom	Labour	PES	Replaced by Glenis Willmott
31 January 2006	Ursula Stenzel	Austria	ÖVP	EPP-ED	Replaced by Hubert Pirker
27 April 2006	Pier Luigi Bersani	Italy	DS	PES	(The next 10 elected to Italian Parliament); Replaced by Achille Occhetto
27 April 2006	Fausto Bertinotti	Italy	RC	EUL/NGL	Replaced by Corrado Gabriele
27 April 2006	Emma Bonino	Italy	Lista Bonino	ALDE	Replaced by Marco Cappato
27 April 2006	Lorenzo Cesa	Italy	UDC	EPP-ED	Replaced by Aldo Patriciello
27 April 2006	Paolo Cirino Pomicino	Italy	AP-UDEUR	EPP-ED	Replaced by Armando Veneto
27 April 2006	Massimo D'Alema	Italy	DS	PES	Replaced by Donata Maria Assunta Gottardi
27 April 2006	Armando Dionisi	Italy	UDC	EPP-ED	Replaced by Carlo Casini
27 April 2006	Antonio Di Pietro	Italy	SCDO	ALDE	Replaced by Andrea Losco
27 April 2006	Enrico Letta	Italy	Margherita	ALDE	Replaced by Gianluca Susta
27 April 2006	Giovanni Procacci	Italy	Margherita	ALDE	Replaced by Donato Tommaso Veraldi
10 May 2006	Rolandas Pavilionis	Lithuania	LDP	UEN	Died. Replaced by Eugenijus Maldeikis
19 June 2006	Corrado Gabriele	Italy	RC	EUL/NGL	Replaced by Vincenzo Aita
31 July 2006	István Pálfi	Hungary	FIDESZ/MPSZ	EPP-ED	Died. Replaced by Antonio de Blasio
27 August 2006	Terry Wynn	United Kingdom	Lab	PES	Replaced by Brian Simpson
26 September 2006	Jonas Sjöstedt	Sweden	V	EUL/NGL	Replaced by Jens Holm
5 October 2006	Cecilia Malmström	Sweden	Fp	ALDE	Swedish Minister of European Affairs. Replaced by Olle Schmidt
8 October 2006	Toomas Hendrik Ilves	Estonia	SDE	PES	President of Estonia. Replaced by Katrin Saks
14 October 2006	Henrik Dam Kristensen	Denmark	SD	PES	Replaced by Christel Schaldemose
7 November 2006	Matteo Salvini	Italy	LN	NI	Replaced by Gian Paolo Gobbo
31 December 2006	Ole Krarup	Denmark	Folk B.	EUL/NGL	Replaced by Søren Bo Søndergaard
10 January 2007	Maria Berger	Austria	SPÖ	PES	Replaced by Wolfgang Bulfon
31 January 2007	Ewa Hedkvist Petersen	Sweden	S	PES	Replaced by Göran Färm
21 February 2007	Camiel Eurlings	Netherlands	CDA	EPP-ED	Dutch Minister. Replaced by Joop Post
8 March 2007	Titus Corlăţean	Romania	PSD	PES	Replaced by Vasile Puşcaş
2 April 2007	Adrian Mihai Cioroianu	Romania	PNL	ALDE	Replaced by Cristian Silviu Buşoi and Horia-Victor Toma
2 April 2007	Ovidiu Ioan Silaghi	Romania	PNL	ALDE	Replaced by Cristian Silviu Buşoi and Horia-Victor Toma
9 April 2007	Albert Jan Maat	Netherlands	CDA	EPP-ED	Replaced by Esther de Lange
18 April 2007	Paavo Väyrynen	Finland	KESK	ALDE	Replaced by Samuli Pohjamo
1 May 2007	Vasile Puşcaş	Romania	PSD	PES	Replaced by Rovana Plumb
17 May 2007	Roselyne Bachelot-Narquin	France	UMP	EPP-ED	French Minister. Replaced by Elisabeth Morin
5 June 2007	Nedzhmi Ali	Bulgaria	DPS	ALDE	Replaced by new members elected in 2007 direct elections: (GERB); Nickolay Mladenov; Petya Stavreva Stavreva; Vladimir Andreev Uruchev; Dushana Panayotova Zdravkova; Rumyana Ruseva Zheleva (DPS); Mariela Velichkova Baeva; Metin Kazak; Vladko Panayotov (NSA); Slavcho Binev; Desislav Chukolov (PES); Iliana Malinova Iotova (NDSV); Biliana Ilieva Raeva
5 June 2007	Georgi Bliznashki	Bulgaria	KzB	PES	Replaced by new members elected in 2007 direct elections: (GERB); Nickolay Mladenov; Petya Stavreva Stavreva; Vladimir Andreev Uruchev; Dushana Panayotova Zdravkova; Rumyana Ruseva Zheleva (DPS); Mariela Velichkova Baeva; Metin Kazak; Vladko Panayotov (NSA); Slavcho Binev; Desislav Chukolov (PES); Iliana Malinova Iotova (NDSV); Biliana Ilieva Raeva
5 June 2007	Mladen Petrov Chervenyakov	Bulgaria	KzB	PES	Replaced by new members elected in 2007 direct elections: (GERB); Nickolay Mladenov; Petya Stavreva Stavreva; Vladimir Andreev Uruchev; Dushana Panayotova Zdravkova; Rumyana Ruseva Zheleva (DPS); Mariela Velichkova Baeva; Metin Kazak; Vladko Panayotov (NSA); Slavcho Binev; Desislav Chukolov (PES); Iliana Malinova Iotova (NDSV); Biliana Ilieva Raeva
5 June 2007	Christina Velcheva Christova	Bulgaria	NDSV	ALDE	Replaced by new members elected in 2007 direct elections: (GERB); Nickolay Mladenov; Petya Stavreva Stavreva; Vladimir Andreev Uruchev; Dushana Panayotova Zdravkova; Rumyana Ruseva Zheleva (DPS); Mariela Velichkova Baeva; Metin Kazak; Vladko Panayotov (NSA); Slavcho Binev; Desislav Chukolov (PES); Iliana Malinova Iotova (NDSV); Biliana Ilieva Raeva
5 June 2007	Konstantin Dimitrov	Bulgaria	DSB	EPP-ED	Replaced by new members elected in 2007 direct elections: (GERB); Nickolay Mladenov; Petya Stavreva Stavreva; Vladimir Andreev Uruchev; Dushana Panayotova Zdravkova; Rumyana Ruseva Zheleva (DPS); Mariela Velichkova Baeva; Metin Kazak; Vladko Panayotov (NSA); Slavcho Binev; Desislav Chukolov (PES); Iliana Malinova Iotova (NDSV); Biliana Ilieva Raeva
5 June 2007	Martin Dimitrov	Bulgaria	ODF	EPP-ED	Replaced by new members elected in 2007 direct elections: (GERB); Nickolay Mladenov; Petya Stavreva Stavreva; Vladimir Andreev Uruchev; Dushana Panayotova Zdravkova; Rumyana Ruseva Zheleva (DPS); Mariela Velichkova Baeva; Metin Kazak; Vladko Panayotov (NSA); Slavcho Binev; Desislav Chukolov (PES); Iliana Malinova Iotova (NDSV); Biliana Ilieva Raeva
5 June 2007	Philip Dimitrov Dimitrov	Bulgaria	ODF	EPP-ED	Replaced by new members elected in 2007 direct elections: (GERB); Nickolay Mladenov; Petya Stavreva Stavreva; Vladimir Andreev Uruchev; Dushana Panayotova Zdravkova; Rumyana Ruseva Zheleva (DPS); Mariela Velichkova Baeva; Metin Kazak; Vladko Panayotov (NSA); Slavcho Binev; Desislav Chukolov (PES); Iliana Malinova Iotova (NDSV); Biliana Ilieva Raeva
5 June 2007	Stanimir Ilchev	Bulgaria	NDSV	ALDE	Replaced by new members elected in 2007 direct elections: (GERB); Nickolay Mladenov; Petya Stavreva Stavreva; Vladimir Andreev Uruchev; Dushana Panayotova Zdravkova; Rumyana Ruseva Zheleva (DPS); Mariela Velichkova Baeva; Metin Kazak; Vladko Panayotov (NSA); Slavcho Binev; Desislav Chukolov (PES); Iliana Malinova Iotova (NDSV); Biliana Ilieva Raeva
5 June 2007	Tchetin Kazak	Bulgaria	DPS	ALDE	Replaced by new members elected in 2007 direct elections: (GERB); Nickolay Mladenov; Petya Stavreva Stavreva; Vladimir Andreev Uruchev; Dushana Panayotova Zdravkova; Rumyana Ruseva Zheleva (DPS); Mariela Velichkova Baeva; Metin Kazak; Vladko Panayotov (NSA); Slavcho Binev; Desislav Chukolov (PES); Iliana Malinova Iotova (NDSV); Biliana Ilieva Raeva
5 June 2007	Antonyia Parvanova	Bulgaria	NDSV	ALDE	Replaced by new members elected in 2007 direct elections: (GERB); Nickolay Mladenov; Petya Stavreva Stavreva; Vladimir Andreev Uruchev; Dushana Panayotova Zdravkova; Rumyana Ruseva Zheleva (DPS); Mariela Velichkova Baeva; Metin Kazak; Vladko Panayotov (NSA); Slavcho Binev; Desislav Chukolov (PES); Iliana Malinova Iotova (NDSV); Biliana Ilieva Raeva
5 June 2007	Lydia Shouleva	Bulgaria	NDSV	ALDE	Replaced by new members elected in 2007 direct elections: (GERB); Nickolay Mladenov; Petya Stavreva Stavreva; Vladimir Andreev Uruchev; Dushana Panayotova Zdravkova; Rumyana Ruseva Zheleva (DPS); Mariela Velichkova Baeva; Metin Kazak; Vladko Panayotov (NSA); Slavcho Binev; Desislav Chukolov (PES); Iliana Malinova Iotova (NDSV); Biliana Ilieva Raeva
5 June 2007	Stefan Sofianski	Bulgaria	BNS	EPP-ED	Replaced by new members elected in 2007 direct elections: (GERB); Nickolay Mladenov; Petya Stavreva Stavreva; Vladimir Andreev Uruchev; Dushana Panayotova Zdravkova; Rumyana Ruseva Zheleva (DPS); Mariela Velichkova Baeva; Metin Kazak; Vladko Panayotov (NSA); Slavcho Binev; Desislav Chukolov (PES); Iliana Malinova Iotova (NDSV); Biliana Ilieva Raeva
10 June 2007	Simon Coveney	Republic of Ireland	FG	EPP-ED	Elected to the Dáil. Replaced by Colm Burke
18 June 2007	Bernat Joan i Mari	Spain	ERC	Greens-EFA	Replaced by Mikel Irujo Amezaga
25 June 2007	Jean-Claude Fruteau	France	PS	PES	Elected to National Assembly. Replaced by: Catherine Neris, Pierre Pribetich; Roselyne Lefrançois
25 June 2007	Pierre Moscovici	France	PS	PES	Elected to National Assembly. Replaced by: Catherine Neris, Pierre Pribetich; Roselyne Lefrançois
25 June 2007	Marie-Line Reynaud	France	PS	PES	Elected to National Assembly. Replaced by: Catherine Neris, Pierre Pribetich; Roselyne Lefrançois
29 June 2007	Marta Vincenzi	Italy	DS	PES	Mayor of Genoa. Replaced by Francesco Ferrari
19 July 2007	Marc Tarabella	Belgium	PS	PES	Minister in Wallonia. Replaced by Giovanna Corda
6 August 2007	Michał Kamiński	Poland	PiS	UEN	Secretary of State in Poland; Replaced by Ewa Tomaszewska
31 August 2007	Margrietus van den Berg	Netherlands	PvdA	PES	Queen's Commissioner in Groningen. Replaced by Lily Jacobs
18 September 2007	Konstantinos Hatzidakis	Greece	ND	EPP-ED	Elected to Greek Parliament.Replaced by: (PASOK); Costas Botopoulos; Maria Eleni Koppa; Anni Podimata (ND); Emmanouil Angelakas; Margaritis Schinas (LA.O.S); Georgios Georgiou
25 September 2007	Panagiotis Beglitis	Greece	PASOK	PES	Elected to Greek Parliament.Replaced by: (PASOK); Costas Botopoulos; Maria Eleni Koppa; Anni Podimata (ND); Emmanouil Angelakas; Margaritis Schinas (LA.O.S); Georgios Georgiou
25 September 2007	Georgios Karatzaferis	Greece	LA.O.S	IND/DEM	Elected to Greek Parliament.Replaced by: (PASOK); Costas Botopoulos; Maria Eleni Koppa; Anni Podimata (ND); Emmanouil Angelakas; Margaritis Schinas (LA.O.S); Georgios Georgiou
25 September 2007	Antonis Samaras	Greece	ND	EPP-ED	Elected to Greek Parliament.Replaced by: (PASOK); Costas Botopoulos; Maria Eleni Koppa; Anni Podimata (ND); Emmanouil Angelakas; Margaritis Schinas (LA.O.S); Georgios Georgiou
25 September 2007	Nikolaos Sifounakis	Greece	PASOK	PES	Elected to Greek Parliament.Replaced by: (PASOK); Costas Botopoulos; Maria Eleni Koppa; Anni Podimata (ND); Emmanouil Angelakas; Margaritis Schinas (LA.O.S); Georgios Georgiou
25 September 2007	Marilisa Xenogiannakopoulou	Greece	PASOK	PES	Elected to Greek Parliament.Replaced by: (PASOK); Costas Botopoulos; Maria Eleni Koppa; Anni Podimata (ND); Emmanouil Angelakas; Margaritis Schinas (LA.O.S); Georgios Georgiou
4 October 2007	Paul Verges	France	PCF	EUL/NGL	Replaced by Madeleine Jouye de Grandmaison
9 October 2007	Fausto De Sousa Correia	Portugal	PS	PES	Died. Replaced by Armando França
16 October 2007	Joop Post	Netherlands	CDA	EPP-ED	Replaced by Cornelis Visser
14 November 2007	Achille Occhetto	Italy	Ind	PES	Appointment overturned. Replaced by Beniamino Donnici
15 November 2007	Bogdan Klich	Poland	PO	EPP-ED	Polish Minister. Replaced by Urszula Gacek
15 November 2007	Barbara Kudrycka	Poland	PO	EPP-ED	Polish Minister. Replaced by Krzysztof Hołowczyc
26 November 2007	Anders Samuelsen	Denmark	RV	ALDE	Elected to the Parliament of Denmark. Replaced by Johannes Lebech
26 November 2007	Gitte Seeberg	Denmark	KF	EPP-ED	Elected to the Parliament of Denmark. Replaced by Christian Rovsing
9 December 2007	Alexandru Athanasiu	Romania	PSD	PES	Replaced by new members elected in 2007 direct elections: PD: Sebastian Valentin Bodu; Nicodim Bulzesc; Dragoş Florin David; Constantin Dumitriu; Petru Filip; Sorin Frunzăverde; Rareş-Lucian Niculescu; Mihaela Popa; Marian Zlotea; PSD: Victor Boştinaru; Titus Corlăţean; Cătălin-Ioan Nechifor; PNL: Magor Imre Csibi; Daniel Dăianu; Ramona Nicole Mănescu; Renate Weber; PLD: Dumitru Oprea; Nicolae Vlad Popa; Theodor Stolojan; UDMR: Csaba Sógor; Iuliu Winkler; Independent: László Tőkés
9 December 2007	Tiberiu Bărbuleţiu	Romania	PNL	ALDE	Replaced by new members elected in 2007 direct elections: PD: Sebastian Valentin Bodu; Nicodim Bulzesc; Dragoş Florin David; Constantin Dumitriu; Petru Filip; Sorin Frunzăverde; Rareş-Lucian Niculescu; Mihaela Popa; Marian Zlotea; PSD: Victor Boştinaru; Titus Corlăţean; Cătălin-Ioan Nechifor; PNL: Magor Imre Csibi; Daniel Dăianu; Ramona Nicole Mănescu; Renate Weber; PLD: Dumitru Oprea; Nicolae Vlad Popa; Theodor Stolojan; UDMR: Csaba Sógor; Iuliu Winkler; Independent: László Tőkés
9 December 2007	Daniela Buruiană Aprodu	Romania	PRM	NI	Replaced by new members elected in 2007 direct elections: PD: Sebastian Valentin Bodu; Nicodim Bulzesc; Dragoş Florin David; Constantin Dumitriu; Petru Filip; Sorin Frunzăverde; Rareş-Lucian Niculescu; Mihaela Popa; Marian Zlotea; PSD: Victor Boştinaru; Titus Corlăţean; Cătălin-Ioan Nechifor; PNL: Magor Imre Csibi; Daniel Dăianu; Ramona Nicole Mănescu; Renate Weber; PLD: Dumitru Oprea; Nicolae Vlad Popa; Theodor Stolojan; UDMR: Csaba Sógor; Iuliu Winkler; Independent: László Tőkés
9 December 2007	Silvia Ciornei	Romania	PC	ALDE	Replaced by new members elected in 2007 direct elections: PD: Sebastian Valentin Bodu; Nicodim Bulzesc; Dragoş Florin David; Constantin Dumitriu; Petru Filip; Sorin Frunzăverde; Rareş-Lucian Niculescu; Mihaela Popa; Marian Zlotea; PSD: Victor Boştinaru; Titus Corlăţean; Cătălin-Ioan Nechifor; PNL: Magor Imre Csibi; Daniel Dăianu; Ramona Nicole Mănescu; Renate Weber; PLD: Dumitru Oprea; Nicolae Vlad Popa; Theodor Stolojan; UDMR: Csaba Sógor; Iuliu Winkler; Independent: László Tőkés
9 December 2007	Mircea Coşea	Romania	PNL	ALDE	Replaced by new members elected in 2007 direct elections: PD: Sebastian Valentin Bodu; Nicodim Bulzesc; Dragoş Florin David; Constantin Dumitriu; Petru Filip; Sorin Frunzăverde; Rareş-Lucian Niculescu; Mihaela Popa; Marian Zlotea; PSD: Victor Boştinaru; Titus Corlăţean; Cătălin-Ioan Nechifor; PNL: Magor Imre Csibi; Daniel Dăianu; Ramona Nicole Mănescu; Renate Weber; PLD: Dumitru Oprea; Nicolae Vlad Popa; Theodor Stolojan; UDMR: Csaba Sógor; Iuliu Winkler; Independent: László Tőkés
9 December 2007	Vasile Dîncu	Romania	PSD	PES	Replaced by new members elected in 2007 direct elections: PD: Sebastian Valentin Bodu; Nicodim Bulzesc; Dragoş Florin David; Constantin Dumitriu; Petru Filip; Sorin Frunzăverde; Rareş-Lucian Niculescu; Mihaela Popa; Marian Zlotea; PSD: Victor Boştinaru; Titus Corlăţean; Cătălin-Ioan Nechifor; PNL: Magor Imre Csibi; Daniel Dăianu; Ramona Nicole Mănescu; Renate Weber; PLD: Dumitru Oprea; Nicolae Vlad Popa; Theodor Stolojan; UDMR: Csaba Sógor; Iuliu Winkler; Independent: László Tőkés
9 December 2007	Cristian Dumitrescu	Romania	PSD	PES	Replaced by new members elected in 2007 direct elections: PD: Sebastian Valentin Bodu; Nicodim Bulzesc; Dragoş Florin David; Constantin Dumitriu; Petru Filip; Sorin Frunzăverde; Rareş-Lucian Niculescu; Mihaela Popa; Marian Zlotea; PSD: Victor Boştinaru; Titus Corlăţean; Cătălin-Ioan Nechifor; PNL: Magor Imre Csibi; Daniel Dăianu; Ramona Nicole Mănescu; Renate Weber; PLD: Dumitru Oprea; Nicolae Vlad Popa; Theodor Stolojan; UDMR: Csaba Sógor; Iuliu Winkler; Independent: László Tőkés
9 December 2007	Ovidiu Victor Ganţ	Romania	DFDR	EPP-ED	Replaced by new members elected in 2007 direct elections: PD: Sebastian Valentin Bodu; Nicodim Bulzesc; Dragoş Florin David; Constantin Dumitriu; Petru Filip; Sorin Frunzăverde; Rareş-Lucian Niculescu; Mihaela Popa; Marian Zlotea; PSD: Victor Boştinaru; Titus Corlăţean; Cătălin-Ioan Nechifor; PNL: Magor Imre Csibi; Daniel Dăianu; Ramona Nicole Mănescu; Renate Weber; PLD: Dumitru Oprea; Nicolae Vlad Popa; Theodor Stolojan; UDMR: Csaba Sógor; Iuliu Winkler; Independent: László Tőkés
9 December 2007	Eduard Raul Hellvig	Romania	PC	ALDE	Replaced by new members elected in 2007 direct elections: PD: Sebastian Valentin Bodu; Nicodim Bulzesc; Dragoş Florin David; Constantin Dumitriu; Petru Filip; Sorin Frunzăverde; Rareş-Lucian Niculescu; Mihaela Popa; Marian Zlotea; PSD: Victor Boştinaru; Titus Corlăţean; Cătălin-Ioan Nechifor; PNL: Magor Imre Csibi; Daniel Dăianu; Ramona Nicole Mănescu; Renate Weber; PLD: Dumitru Oprea; Nicolae Vlad Popa; Theodor Stolojan; UDMR: Csaba Sógor; Iuliu Winkler; Independent: László Tőkés
9 December 2007	Attila Kelemen	Romania	UDMR	EPP-ED	Replaced by new members elected in 2007 direct elections: PD: Sebastian Valentin Bodu; Nicodim Bulzesc; Dragoş Florin David; Constantin Dumitriu; Petru Filip; Sorin Frunzăverde; Rareş-Lucian Niculescu; Mihaela Popa; Marian Zlotea; PSD: Victor Boştinaru; Titus Corlăţean; Cătălin-Ioan Nechifor; PNL: Magor Imre Csibi; Daniel Dăianu; Ramona Nicole Mănescu; Renate Weber; PLD: Dumitru Oprea; Nicolae Vlad Popa; Theodor Stolojan; UDMR: Csaba Sógor; Iuliu Winkler; Independent: László Tőkés
9 December 2007	Sándor Kónya-Hamar	Romania	UDMR	EPP-ED	Replaced by new members elected in 2007 direct elections: PD: Sebastian Valentin Bodu; Nicodim Bulzesc; Dragoş Florin David; Constantin Dumitriu; Petru Filip; Sorin Frunzăverde; Rareş-Lucian Niculescu; Mihaela Popa; Marian Zlotea; PSD: Victor Boştinaru; Titus Corlăţean; Cătălin-Ioan Nechifor; PNL: Magor Imre Csibi; Daniel Dăianu; Ramona Nicole Mănescu; Renate Weber; PLD: Dumitru Oprea; Nicolae Vlad Popa; Theodor Stolojan; UDMR: Csaba Sógor; Iuliu Winkler; Independent: László Tőkés
9 December 2007	Dan Mihalache	Romania	PSD	PES	Replaced by new members elected in 2007 direct elections: PD: Sebastian Valentin Bodu; Nicodim Bulzesc; Dragoş Florin David; Constantin Dumitriu; Petru Filip; Sorin Frunzăverde; Rareş-Lucian Niculescu; Mihaela Popa; Marian Zlotea; PSD: Victor Boştinaru; Titus Corlăţean; Cătălin-Ioan Nechifor; PNL: Magor Imre Csibi; Daniel Dăianu; Ramona Nicole Mănescu; Renate Weber; PLD: Dumitru Oprea; Nicolae Vlad Popa; Theodor Stolojan; UDMR: Csaba Sógor; Iuliu Winkler; Independent: László Tőkés
9 December 2007	Eugen Mihăescu	Romania	PRM	NI	Replaced by new members elected in 2007 direct elections: PD: Sebastian Valentin Bodu; Nicodim Bulzesc; Dragoş Florin David; Constantin Dumitriu; Petru Filip; Sorin Frunzăverde; Rareş-Lucian Niculescu; Mihaela Popa; Marian Zlotea; PSD: Victor Boştinaru; Titus Corlăţean; Cătălin-Ioan Nechifor; PNL: Magor Imre Csibi; Daniel Dăianu; Ramona Nicole Mănescu; Renate Weber; PLD: Dumitru Oprea; Nicolae Vlad Popa; Theodor Stolojan; UDMR: Csaba Sógor; Iuliu Winkler; Independent: László Tőkés
9 December 2007	Viorica Georgeta Pompilia Moisuc	Romania	PRM	NI	Replaced by new members elected in 2007 direct elections: PD: Sebastian Valentin Bodu; Nicodim Bulzesc; Dragoş Florin David; Constantin Dumitriu; Petru Filip; Sorin Frunzăverde; Rareş-Lucian Niculescu; Mihaela Popa; Marian Zlotea; PSD: Victor Boştinaru; Titus Corlăţean; Cătălin-Ioan Nechifor; PNL: Magor Imre Csibi; Daniel Dăianu; Ramona Nicole Mănescu; Renate Weber; PLD: Dumitru Oprea; Nicolae Vlad Popa; Theodor Stolojan; UDMR: Csaba Sógor; Iuliu Winkler; Independent: László Tőkés
9 December 2007	Alexandru Ioan Morţun	Romania	PNL	ALDE	Replaced by new members elected in 2007 direct elections: PD: Sebastian Valentin Bodu; Nicodim Bulzesc; Dragoş Florin David; Constantin Dumitriu; Petru Filip; Sorin Frunzăverde; Rareş-Lucian Niculescu; Mihaela Popa; Marian Zlotea; PSD: Victor Boştinaru; Titus Corlăţean; Cătălin-Ioan Nechifor; PNL: Magor Imre Csibi; Daniel Dăianu; Ramona Nicole Mănescu; Renate Weber; PLD: Dumitru Oprea; Nicolae Vlad Popa; Theodor Stolojan; UDMR: Csaba Sógor; Iuliu Winkler; Independent: László Tőkés
9 December 2007	Radu Podgorean	Romania	PSD	PES	Replaced by new members elected in 2007 direct elections: PD: Sebastian Valentin Bodu; Nicodim Bulzesc; Dragoş Florin David; Constantin Dumitriu; Petru Filip; Sorin Frunzăverde; Rareş-Lucian Niculescu; Mihaela Popa; Marian Zlotea; PSD: Victor Boştinaru; Titus Corlăţean; Cătălin-Ioan Nechifor; PNL: Magor Imre Csibi; Daniel Dăianu; Ramona Nicole Mănescu; Renate Weber; PLD: Dumitru Oprea; Nicolae Vlad Popa; Theodor Stolojan; UDMR: Csaba Sógor; Iuliu Winkler; Independent: László Tőkés
9 December 2007	Petre Popeangă	Romania	PRM	NI	Replaced by new members elected in 2007 direct elections: PD: Sebastian Valentin Bodu; Nicodim Bulzesc; Dragoş Florin David; Constantin Dumitriu; Petru Filip; Sorin Frunzăverde; Rareş-Lucian Niculescu; Mihaela Popa; Marian Zlotea; PSD: Victor Boştinaru; Titus Corlăţean; Cătălin-Ioan Nechifor; PNL: Magor Imre Csibi; Daniel Dăianu; Ramona Nicole Mănescu; Renate Weber; PLD: Dumitru Oprea; Nicolae Vlad Popa; Theodor Stolojan; UDMR: Csaba Sógor; Iuliu Winkler; Independent: László Tőkés
9 December 2007	Gheorghe Vergil Șerbu	Romania	PNL	ALDE	Replaced by new members elected in 2007 direct elections: PD: Sebastian Valentin Bodu; Nicodim Bulzesc; Dragoş Florin David; Constantin Dumitriu; Petru Filip; Sorin Frunzăverde; Rareş-Lucian Niculescu; Mihaela Popa; Marian Zlotea; PSD: Victor Boştinaru; Titus Corlăţean; Cătălin-Ioan Nechifor; PNL: Magor Imre Csibi; Daniel Dăianu; Ramona Nicole Mănescu; Renate Weber; PLD: Dumitru Oprea; Nicolae Vlad Popa; Theodor Stolojan; UDMR: Csaba Sógor; Iuliu Winkler; Independent: László Tőkés
9 December 2007	Cristian Stănescu	Romania	PRM	NI	Replaced by new members elected in 2007 direct elections: PD: Sebastian Valentin Bodu; Nicodim Bulzesc; Dragoş Florin David; Constantin Dumitriu; Petru Filip; Sorin Frunzăverde; Rareş-Lucian Niculescu; Mihaela Popa; Marian Zlotea; PSD: Victor Boştinaru; Titus Corlăţean; Cătălin-Ioan Nechifor; PNL: Magor Imre Csibi; Daniel Dăianu; Ramona Nicole Mănescu; Renate Weber; PLD: Dumitru Oprea; Nicolae Vlad Popa; Theodor Stolojan; UDMR: Csaba Sógor; Iuliu Winkler; Independent: László Tőkés
9 December 2007	Károly Ferenc Szabó	Romania	UDMR	EPP-ED	Replaced by new members elected in 2007 direct elections: PD: Sebastian Valentin Bodu; Nicodim Bulzesc; Dragoş Florin David; Constantin Dumitriu; Petru Filip; Sorin Frunzăverde; Rareş-Lucian Niculescu; Mihaela Popa; Marian Zlotea; PSD: Victor Boştinaru; Titus Corlăţean; Cătălin-Ioan Nechifor; PNL: Magor Imre Csibi; Daniel Dăianu; Ramona Nicole Mănescu; Renate Weber; PLD: Dumitru Oprea; Nicolae Vlad Popa; Theodor Stolojan; UDMR: Csaba Sógor; Iuliu Winkler; Independent: László Tőkés
9 December 2007	Radu Tîrle	Romania	DA	EPP-ED	Replaced by new members elected in 2007 direct elections: PD: Sebastian Valentin Bodu; Nicodim Bulzesc; Dragoş Florin David; Constantin Dumitriu; Petru Filip; Sorin Frunzăverde; Rareş-Lucian Niculescu; Mihaela Popa; Marian Zlotea; PSD: Victor Boştinaru; Titus Corlăţean; Cătălin-Ioan Nechifor; PNL: Magor Imre Csibi; Daniel Dăianu; Ramona Nicole Mănescu; Renate Weber; PLD: Dumitru Oprea; Nicolae Vlad Popa; Theodor Stolojan; UDMR: Csaba Sógor; Iuliu Winkler; Independent: László Tőkés
9 December 2007	Horia-Victor Toma	Romania	PNL	ALDE	Replaced by new members elected in 2007 direct elections: PD: Sebastian Valentin Bodu; Nicodim Bulzesc; Dragoş Florin David; Constantin Dumitriu; Petru Filip; Sorin Frunzăverde; Rareş-Lucian Niculescu; Mihaela Popa; Marian Zlotea; PSD: Victor Boştinaru; Titus Corlăţean; Cătălin-Ioan Nechifor; PNL: Magor Imre Csibi; Daniel Dăianu; Ramona Nicole Mănescu; Renate Weber; PLD: Dumitru Oprea; Nicolae Vlad Popa; Theodor Stolojan; UDMR: Csaba Sógor; Iuliu Winkler; Independent: László Tőkés
31 December 2007	Jean-Louis Bourlanges	France	UDF	ALDE	Replaced by Brigitte Fouré
31 March 2008	Joan Calabuig Rull	Spain	PSOE	PES	Elected to Congress of Deputies. Replaced by PP; Florencio Luque Aguilar; Juan Andrés Naranjo Escobar; Salvador Domingo Sanz Palacio; PSOE; Juan Fraile Cantón; PSC; Martí Grau i Segú
31 March 2008	Ana Mato Adrover	Spain	PP	EPP-ED	Elected to Congress of Deputies. Replaced by PP; Florencio Luque Aguilar; Juan Andrés Naranjo Escobar; Salvador Domingo Sanz Palacio; PSOE; Juan Fraile Cantón; PSC; Martí Grau i Segú
31 March 2008	Cristóbal Montoro Romero	Spain	PP	EPP-ED	Elected to Congress of Deputies. Replaced by PP; Florencio Luque Aguilar; Juan Andrés Naranjo Escobar; Salvador Domingo Sanz Palacio; PSOE; Juan Fraile Cantón; PSC; Martí Grau i Segú
31 March 2008	Luisa Fernanda Rudi Ubeda	Spain	PP	EPP-ED	Elected to Congress of Deputies. Replaced by PP; Florencio Luque Aguilar; Juan Andrés Naranjo Escobar; Salvador Domingo Sanz Palacio; PSOE; Juan Fraile Cantón; PSC; Martí Grau i Segú
31 March 2008	María Valenciano Martínez-Orozco	Spain	PSOE	PES	Elected to Congress of Deputies. Replaced by PP; Florencio Luque Aguilar; Juan Andrés Naranjo Escobar; Salvador Domingo Sanz Palacio; PSOE; Juan Fraile Cantón; PSC; Martí Grau i Segú
3 April 2008	Alexander Stubb	Finland	KOK	EPP-ED	Minister for Foreign Affairs. Replaced by Sirpa Pietikäinen
28 April 2008	Alfonso Andria	Italy	Margherita	ALDE	(PD); Fabio Ciani; Catiuscia Marini; Maria Grazia Pagano (FI); Elisabetta Gardini; Iva Zanicchi (AS); Roberto Fiore (AN); Domenico Antonio Basile; Ind; Giovanni Robusti
28 April 2008	Umberto Bossi	Italy	LN	UEN	(PD); Fabio Ciani; Catiuscia Marini; Maria Grazia Pagano (FI); Elisabetta Gardini; Iva Zanicchi (AS); Roberto Fiore (AN); Domenico Antonio Basile; Ind; Giovanni Robusti
28 April 2008	Renato Brunetta	Italy	FI	EPP-ED	(PD); Fabio Ciani; Catiuscia Marini; Maria Grazia Pagano (FI); Elisabetta Gardini; Iva Zanicchi (AS); Roberto Fiore (AN); Domenico Antonio Basile; Ind; Giovanni Robusti
28 April 2008	Mario Mantovani	Italy	FI	EPP-ED	(PD); Fabio Ciani; Catiuscia Marini; Maria Grazia Pagano (FI); Elisabetta Gardini; Iva Zanicchi (AS); Roberto Fiore (AN); Domenico Antonio Basile; Ind; Giovanni Robusti
28 April 2008	Alessandra Mussolini	Italy	AS	NI	(PD); Fabio Ciani; Catiuscia Marini; Maria Grazia Pagano (FI); Elisabetta Gardini; Iva Zanicchi (AS); Roberto Fiore (AN); Domenico Antonio Basile; Ind; Giovanni Robusti
28 April 2008	Lapo Pistelli	Italy	Margherita	ALDE	(PD); Fabio Ciani; Catiuscia Marini; Maria Grazia Pagano (FI); Elisabetta Gardini; Iva Zanicchi (AS); Roberto Fiore (AN); Domenico Antonio Basile; Ind; Giovanni Robusti
28 April 2008	Adriana Poli Bortone	Italy	AN	UEN	(PD); Fabio Ciani; Catiuscia Marini; Maria Grazia Pagano (FI); Elisabetta Gardini; Iva Zanicchi (AS); Roberto Fiore (AN); Domenico Antonio Basile; Ind; Giovanni Robusti
28 April 2008	Luciana Sbarbati	Italy	MRE	ALDE	(PD); Fabio Ciani; Catiuscia Marini; Maria Grazia Pagano (FI); Elisabetta Gardini; Iva Zanicchi (AS); Roberto Fiore (AN); Domenico Antonio Basile; Ind; Giovanni Robusti
29 April 2008	Edith Mastenbroek	Netherlands	PvdA	PES	Replaced by Jan Cremers
8 May 2008	Antonio Tajani	Italy	FI	EPP-ED	Replaced by Paolo Bartolozzi
8 May 2008	Jens-Peter Bonde	Denmark	Juni B.	IND/DEM	Replaced by Hanne Dahl
17 May 2008	Adeline Hazan	France	PS	PES	Replaced by Catherine Boursier
19 May 2008	Diamanto Manolakou	Greece	KKE	EUL/NGL	Replaced by Konstantinos Droutsas
21 May 2008	Raffaele Lombardo	Italy	MPA	EPP-ED	Replaced by Sebastiano Sanzarello
16 June 2008	Nicola Zingaretti	Italy	DS	PES	Replaced by Rapisardo Antinucci
22 June 2008	Francesco Musotto	Italy	FI	EPP-ED	Replaced by Innocenzo Leontini
22 June 2008	Gian Paolo Gobbo	Italy	LN	UEN	Replaced by Erminio Enzo Boso
13 July 2008	Bronisław Geremek	Poland	UW	ALDE	Died in car crash. Replaced by Andrzej Wielowieyski
23 July 2008	Innocenzo Leontini	Italy	FI	EPP-ED	Replaced by Eleonora Lo Curto
1 August 2008	Willi Piecyk	Germany	SPD	PES	Replaced by Ulrike Rodust
11 September 2008	Giuseppe Castiglione	Italy	FI	EPP-ED	Replaced by Maddalena Calia
30 September 2008	Joseph Muscat	Malta	Malta Labour Party	PES	Elected Member of the Maltese Parliament and Leader of the Opposition. Replaced by Glenn Bedingfield
30 September 2008	Robert Navarro	France	PS	PES	Replaced by Michel Teychenné
30 September 2008	Lilli Gruber	Italy	Olive Tree	PES	Replaced by Monica Giuntini
30 September 2008	Bernadette Bourzai	France	PS	PES	Replaced by Jean-Paul Denanot
30 September 2008	Graham Booth	United Kingdom	UKIP	IND/DEM	Replaced by Trevor Colman
14 October 2008	Borut Pahor	Slovenia	SD	PES	Replaced by Aurelio Juri
3 November 2008	Romano Maria la Russa	Italy	AN	UEN	Replaced by Antonio Mussa
2 December 2008	Alexander Radwan	Germany	CSU	EPP-ED	Replaced by Martin Kastler
10 December 2008	Karin Scheele	Austria	SPÖ	PES	Replaced by Maria Berger
18 December 2008	Mihaela Popa	Romania	PSD	EPP-ED	Replaced by: Călin Cătălin Chiriţă; Daniel Petru Funeriu; Adrian Manole; Iosif Matula; Alexandru Nazare
18 December 2008	Dumitru Oprea	Romania	PLD	ALDE	Replaced by: Călin Cătălin Chiriţă; Daniel Petru Funeriu; Adrian Manole; Iosif Matula; Alexandru Nazare
18 December 2008	Monica Maria Iacob-Ridzi	Romania	PD	EPP-ED	Replaced by: Călin Cătălin Chiriţă; Daniel Petru Funeriu; Adrian Manole; Iosif Matula; Alexandru Nazare
18 December 2008	Petru Filip	Romania	PSD	EPP-ED	Replaced by: Călin Cătălin Chiriţă; Daniel Petru Funeriu; Adrian Manole; Iosif Matula; Alexandru Nazare
18 December 2008	Roberta Alma Anastase	Romania	PD	EPP-ED	Replaced by: Călin Cătălin Chiriţă; Daniel Petru Funeriu; Adrian Manole; Iosif Matula; Alexandru Nazare
18 December 2008	Cătălin-Ioan Nechifor	Romania	PSD	PES	Replaced by: Vasilica Viorica Dăncilă; Alin Lucian Antochi
18 December 2008	Titus Corlăţean	Romania	PSD	PES	Replaced by: Vasilica Viorica Dăncilă; Alin Lucian Antochi
31 December 2008	Piia-Noora Kauppi	Finland	KOK	EPP-ED	Replaced by Eva-Riitta Siitonen
31 January 2009	Michel Rocard	France	PS	PES	Replaced by Bernard Soulage
16 February 2009	Marian Zlotea	Romania	PSD	EPP-ED	Replaced by Ioan Lucian Hămbăşan
9 March 2009	Daniel Varela Suanzes-Carpegna	Spain	PP	EPP-ED	Replaced by Daniel Bautista
11 March 2009	Valdis Dombrovskis	Latvia	JL	EPP-ED	Replaced by Liene Liepiņa
22 April 2009	Ignasi Guardans Cambó	Spain	CiU (CDC)	ALDE	Replaced by Joan Vallvé
4 May 2009	María Isabel Salinas García	Spain	PSOE	PES	
27 May 2009	Carlos Carnero González	Spain	PSOE	PES	

== Sources ==
- EU elections site
- French Ministry of the Interior
- Italian Ministry of the Interior
- rai.it & Uniti nell'ulivo
- Polish Official Results
- slovensko.com
- European Parliament – Your MEPs

== See also ==
- Members of the European Parliament 2004–2009
- 2004 European Parliament election
