= Vakalis =

Vakalis (Greek: Βακάλης) is a Greek surname. Notable people with the surname include:

- Donna Vakalis (born 1979), Canadian modern pentathlete
- Nassos Vakalis (born 1966), American animator and film director
- Nikos Vakalis (1939–2017), Greek politician
