= Gewalt =

Gewalt is a German surname. Notable people with the surname include:

- Olle Gewalt (1921–1985), Swedish curler
- Roland Gewalt (born 1958), German politician
- Wolfgang Gewalt (1928–2007), German zoologist
