= Zimmerling =

Zimmerling is a German surname. Notable people with the surname include:

- Jürgen Zimmerling (1952–2005), German politician
- Matthias Zimmerling (born 1967), German footballer and manager
