= Evangelia Tzampazi =

Greek politician

Evangelia Tzampazi (Ευαγγελία Τζαμπάζη; born 5 October 1960 in Serres, Greece) is a Greek politician and Member of the European Parliament (MEP) for the Panhellenic Socialist Movement; part of the Party of European Socialists.
