= Daniel Strož =

Czech politician

Daniel Strož (born 4 August 1943 in Plzeň) is a Czech politician and former Member of the European Parliament for the Communist Party of Bohemia and Moravia; part of the European United Left–Nordic Green Left party group in the European Parliament.
