= Francesco Ferrari (politician, born 1946) =

Italian politician (1946–2022)

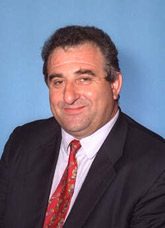
Francesco Ferrari

Francesco Ferrari (16 December 1946 – 23 May 2022) was an Italian politician. He was appointed to the European Parliament on 5 July 2007 to replace Marta Vincenzi, and sat as a member of the Alliance of Liberals and Democrats for Europe group. He was a member of United in the Olive Tree – for Europe.
