= Gabriele Stauner =

German politician and a former Member of the European Parliament (born 1948)

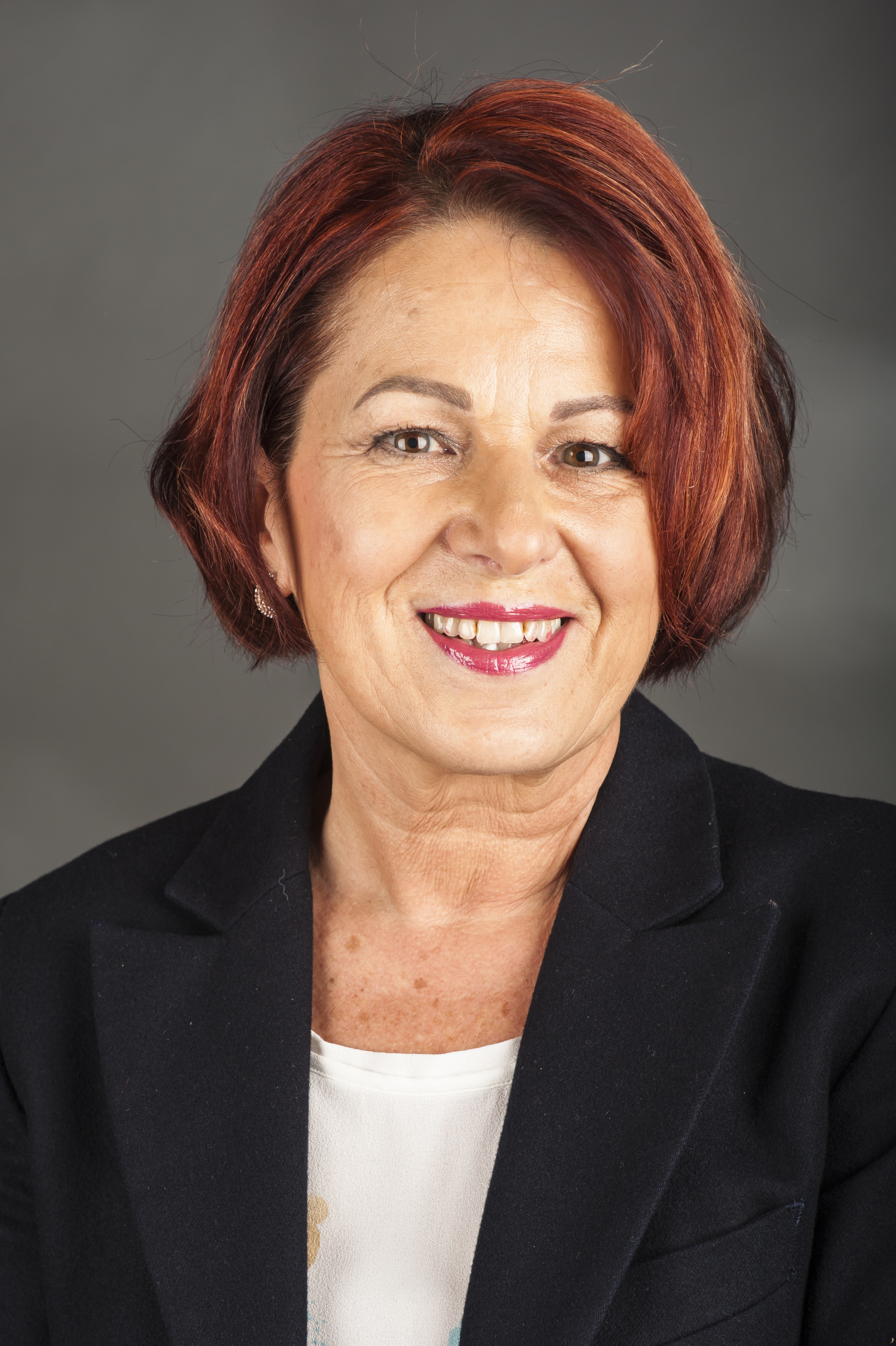
- Stauner in 2014

Member of the European Parliament
- In office 1 July 2004 – 1 July 2014
- Constituency: Germany

Personal details
- Born: 22 April 1948 (age 78) Wolfratshausen, Germany
- Party: Germany; Christian Social Union in Bavaria; EU; European People's Party
- Education: University of Vienna
- Website: www.stauner.de

Gabriele Stauner (born 22 April 1948) is a German politician and a former Member of the European Parliament (MEP) from Germany. She is a member of the Christian Social Union in Bavaria, part of the European People's Party.

== Education and early career ==
In 1972 Stauner became qualified as an interpreter in English, French, and Russian. She took her first state law examination in 1977 and her second state law examination in 1979. In 1982 she received a doctorate in the field of law. She worked as a trainee lawyer from 1977 to 1979 and as a civil servant of the Free State of Bavaria from 1979 to 1987, and in 1990. From 1987 to 1990 she was an official of the foreign service of the Federal Republic of Germany.

== Political career ==
Stauner has been a member of the Upper Bavaria Christian Social Union district executive since 1995 and vice-chairman of Bad Tölz-Wolfratshausen district executive of the Christian Social Union since 1999. In 2000 she became Land vice-chairman of the Christian-Social Workers' Organisation. In 1996 she became a member of Bad Tölz-Wolfratshausen district council. She is also a lecturer at the University of Regensburg.

In 1999, Gabriele Stauner became a member of the 5th European Parliament. During this time, she served on the Committee on Budgetary Control and the delegation to the EU-Russia Parliamentary Cooperation Committee. In her capacity as member of the Committee on Budgetary Control, she drafted the committee's report on granting budget discharge for 1998 and 2002. She also became well known in the Parliament for her attacks on Commission secrecy over a fraud case involving the Fléchard dairy and abuse of EU butter export subsidies worth tens of millions in the 1990s. In 2001, she belonged to a cross-party grouping of MEPs, that brought a legal action before the European Court of Justice over the obstacles they faced in securing copies of classified EU documents.

Although she failed to win re-election in 2004, Stauner became a member of the 6th European Parliament on 18 January 2006, after Joachim Wuermeling had left to become State Secretary in the German Federal Ministry for Economics and Technology on 18 December 2005. She served as a member of the Committee on Legal Affairs and a delegation to the EU-Armenia, EU-Azerbaijan and EU-Georgia Parliamentary Cooperation Committees. She also was a substitute for the Committee on Employment and Social Affairs, the delegation to the EU-Russia Parliamentary Cooperation Committee, and the delegation to the EU-Ukraine Parliamentary Cooperation Committee.

In October 2013, Stauner returned to the European Parliament to take over from Anja Weisgerber who was elected to the German Bundestag.

== Controversies ==
In 2001, Stauner issued a statement through her office, saying she thought it was “ridiculous” that details of her financial interests should be put on the European Parliament's website. At the time, Swedish MEP Cecilia Malmström said: “It’s astonishing that [Stauner] is known for calling for more transparency, and has criticised the Commission a lot because of its lack of transparency. She should be setting a good example.”

During the Azerbaijani presidential elections in 2013, Stauner participated in an election monitoring delegation funded by the Berlin-based Society for the Promotion of German-Azerbaijani Relations (GEFDAB); the organization is registered as a private company. The resulting report on Azerbaijan's presidential election was subsequently criticized as markedly kinder than the verdict of the Organization for Security and Co-operation in Europe.
