= Bernard Piotr Wojciechowski =

Polish politician

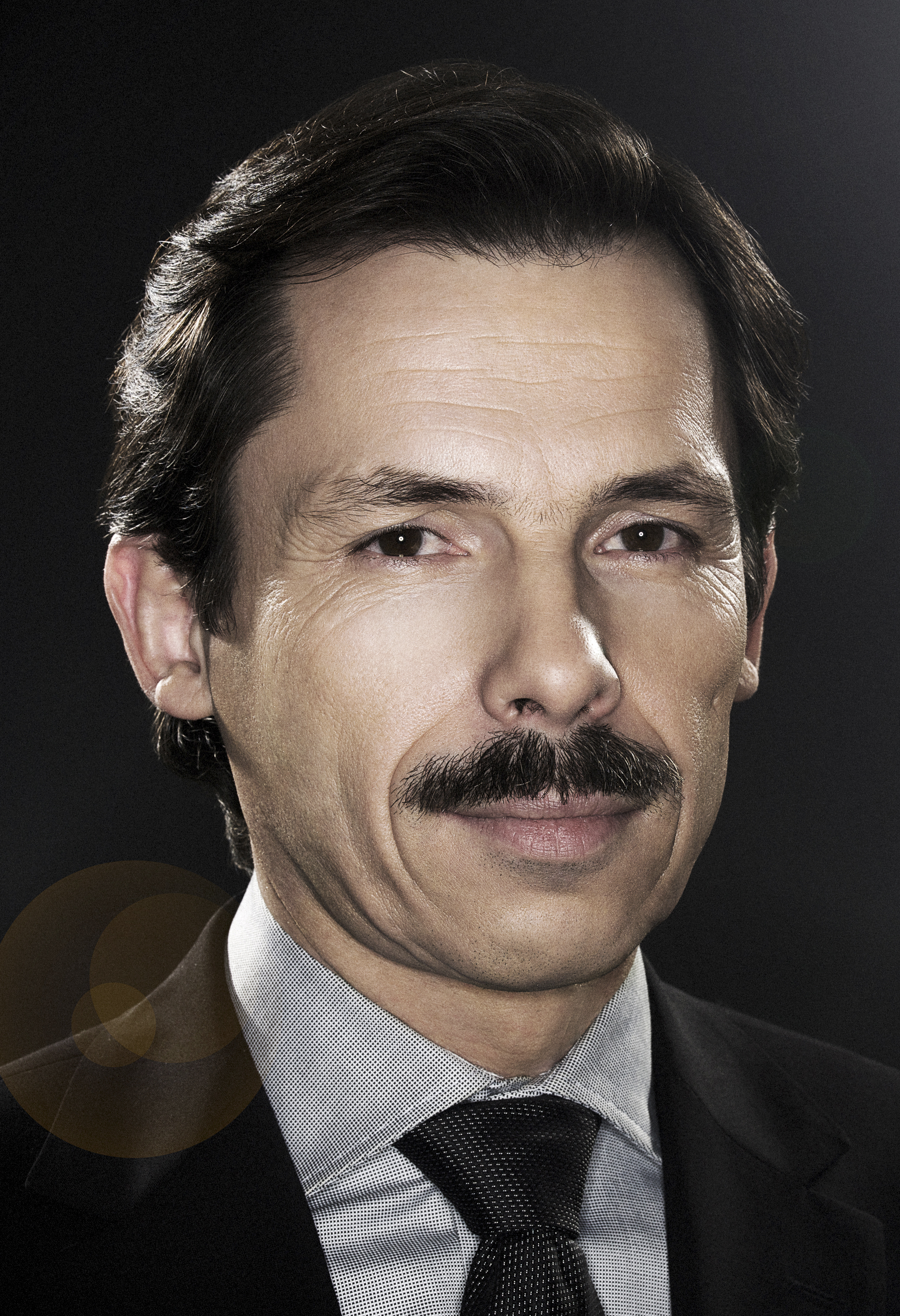

Bernard Piotr Wojciechowski (18 August 1958 in Łowicz) is a Polish politician and a Member of the European Parliament (MEP). He was a member of the League of Polish Families, but is a Non-attached Member in the European Parliament. He was a member of the Committee on Constitutional Affairs.

Bernard Piotr Wojciechowski received a master's degree in English Philology from Warsaw University in 1985. In 1980 he graduated from the National College for Stenography and Foreign Language Studies in Warsaw, specializing in air transport economics and organisation.

Until October 2005, prior to becoming a Member of the European Parliament, he was a Wawer District Councillor in Warsaw. During this time he was a member of the District Council Committee Municipal Economic Development and Investment and a member of the Committee Education, Culture, and Sport.
