= Zsolt Becsey =

Hungarian politician

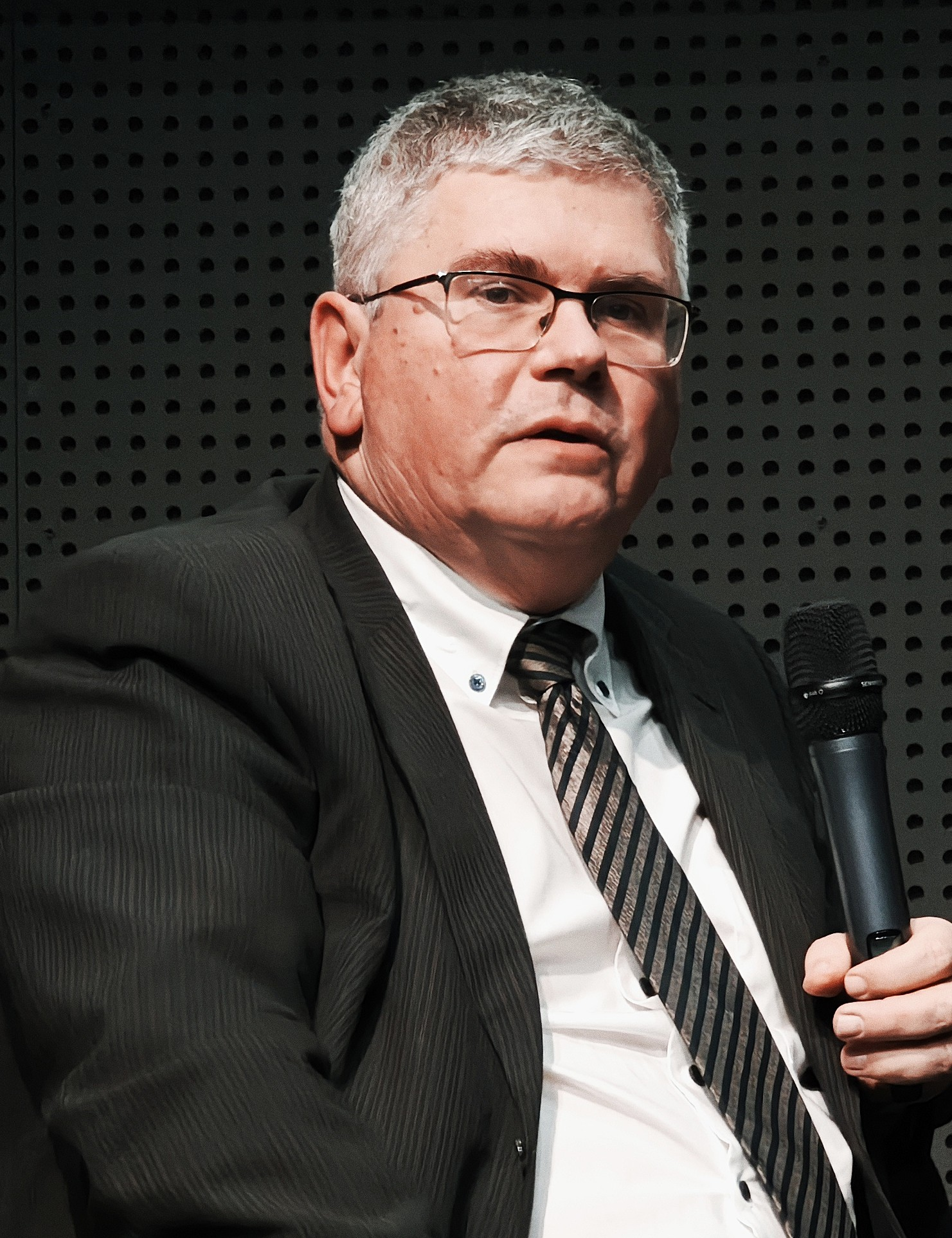
Zsolt Becsey in 2026

Zsolt László Becsey (born 12 January 1964 in Szeged) is a Hungarian politician and former Member of the European Parliament (MEP) with the Fidesz, part of the European People's Party. He sat on the European Parliament's Committee on Economic and Monetary Affairs.

Becsey was also a substitute for the Committee on Transport and Tourism, substitute for the Delegation to the EU-Croatia Joint Parliamentary Committee.

From 2010 to 2011, Becsey served as State Secretary for Foreign Economic Relations in the Ministry of National Economy.

== Education ==
- 1988: Karl Marx University of Economics, university diploma
- 1988: Desk officer with responsibility for the Council of Europe, Ministry of Foreign Affairs
- 1991: Secretary, Hungary's Representation to the EU, Brussels
- Ministry of Foreign Affairs
- 1999: Deputy head, Hungary's Representation to the EU, Brussels

== See also ==
- 2004 European Parliament election in Hungary

== Personal life ==
He is married and has three children.
