= Diamanto Manolakou =

Greek politician (born 1959)

Diamanto Manolakou (Greek: Διαμάντω Μανωλάκου; born 1 March 1959, in Piraeus) is a Greek politician. She was elected as a Member of the European Parliament (MEP) for the Communist Party of Greece in the 2004 European elections, an office she held until 5 June 2008, when she resigned in favor of Costas Droutsas. She sat with the European United Left–Nordic Green Left. She resigned in order to take a seat in the Hellenic Parliament, one previously held by Elpida Pantelaki. She was re-elected to the Hellenic Parliament in 2009, May and June 2012, January and September 2015, 2019, May 2023 and June 2023.
