= Corrado Gabriele =

Italian politician

Member of the European Parliament
- In office 8 May 2006 – 19 June 2006
- Constituency: Italy

Personal details
- Born: November 1966 (age 59) Naples, Italy
- Party: Communist Refoundation Party
- Other political affiliations: European United Left–Nordic Green Left (group)
- Occupation: Politician

Corrado Gabriele (born November 1966) is an Italian politician. He was a member of the European Parliament from May 8, 2006, when he took up a seat vacated after the 2006 Italian general election, until June 19 in the same year. He represented the Communist Refoundation Party within the European United Left–Nordic Green Left parliamentary group.
