= Costas Droutsas =

Greek politician

Costas Droutsas (Greek: Κώστας Δρούτσας, born on 5 December 1939 in Thessaloniki) is a Greek politician, a member of the Greek Communist Party. He was a member of the European Parliament from 3 June 2008 to 13 July 2009, representing Greece in the seat previously held by Diamanto Manolakou.
