= Horst Posdorf =

German politician and a Member of the European Parliament (1949 - 2017)

Horst Posdorf (8 February 1949 in Dornum – 12 October 2017) was a German politician and a Member of the European Parliament (2005-2009). He was a member of the Christian Democratic Union of Germany, which is affiliated with the Group of the European People's Party (Christian Democrats) and European Democrats in the European Parliament.

He was a member of the Committee on Development and the delegation for relations with Arab states of the Persian Gulf, including Yemen. He was also a substitute for the Committee on the Internal Market and Consumer Protection, the delegation for relations with the countries of Southeast Asia and the Association of Southeast Asian Nations, and the delegation to the ACP-EU Joint Parliamentary Assembly.

Horst Posdorf earned a degree in mathematics in 1974. He worked as a probationary teacher in 1974 and 1975, as a teaching inspector in 1975, and as an academic employee at the computer center of Ruhr University Bochum from 1976 to 1978. He was senior teacher from 1978 to 1980 and has been a Professor of Mathematics at Dortmund Vocational College since 1981. He was conferred an Honorary Doctorate in Public Administration by the University of Cambodia in 2008.

Horst Posdorf was a member of the North Rhine-Westphalia Land Assembly from 1985 to 2000. He has been a member of the Executive of the European Pensioners Union since 2003 and a member of the SES Germany pensioners export service since 2005. In 1994 he received a Federal Cross of Merit with Ribbon and in 2002 he received a Federal Order of Merit, First Class.

Posdorf was one of six Members of the European Parliament participating in the European Union's observer mission in Togo for the October 2007 Togolese parliamentary election.
