= Sérgio Ribeiro (politician) =

Portuguese politician (1935–2024)

Sérgio José Ferreira Ribeiro (21 December 1935 – 29 April 2024) was a Portuguese politician. He was a Member of the European Parliament (MEP) for the Portuguese Communist Party (part of the European United Left–Nordic Green Left group), having been elected in the 2004 election, but was replaced on 13 January 2005 by Pedro Guerreiro, of the same party. Ribeiro died on 29 April 2024, at the age of 88.
