= Göran Färm =

Swedish politician

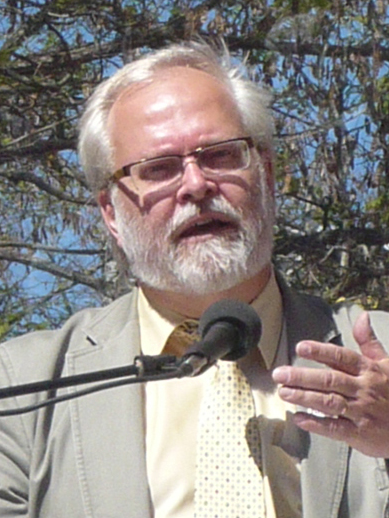
Göran Färm

Göran Färm (born 17 October 1949) is a former PES Member of the European Parliament (MEP) for Sweden. His national party is the Swedish Social Democratic Party and sits on the Committee on Budgets. He is also part of the delegation for South East Europe.

== Curriculum Vitae ==
- Advanced school-leaving certificate (1968).
- Diploma (Stockholm College of Journalism, 1971).
- Journalist on various newspapers (1970–1973).
- Editor-in-chief of SSU (Social-Democratic Youth of Sweden) newspaper 'Frihet' (1973–1976).
- Head of advertising agency ARE Idé 2 (1976–1979).
- Various posts with the Swedish Confederation of Trade Unions, including Head of the Economic Policy Unit (1979–1986).
- Director of Information, Riksbyggen (1986–1987).
- Editor-in-chief of Örebro-Kuriren (1987–1988).
- Own consultancy (1989–1994 and 2004–2007).
- Member of executive committee of the Social-Democratic Youth of Sweden (1978–1981).
- Chairman of the Social-Democratic Party, Norrköping (1991–1994).
- Member of Östergötland party district (1991–1994).
- Vice-President, International Union of Socialist Youth (1979–1981).
- Municipal Commissioner, Norrköping (1994–1999).
- Member of Östsams regional council (2004–2007).
- Chairman of Östsams international relations committee (1997–1999 and 2004–2006).
- Member of the Committee on Regional Policy and its Transport Committee (1995–1999).
- Member of the Board, Baltic Sea States Subregional Cooperation (1997–1999).
- Special adviser to Commissioner Margot Wallström (2005–2007).
- 2004 Book (together with First Vice President of the European Commission Margot Wallström): THE PEOPLE’ S EUROPE or Why is it so hard to love the EU? (Swedish: “FOLKENS EUROPA eller Varför är det så svårt att älska EU?” - ISBN 91-89660-54-4)
