= Pedro Guerreiro =

Portuguese politician

Pedro Miguel Neves Guerreiro (born 25 February 1966, Lisbon) is a Portuguese politician and Member of the European Parliament for the Portuguese Communist Party, part of the European United Left - Nordic Green Left group. He took his seat in the European Parliament on 13 January 2005, replacing Sérgio Ribeiro of the same party.
