= Anni Podimata =

Greek politician (born 1962)

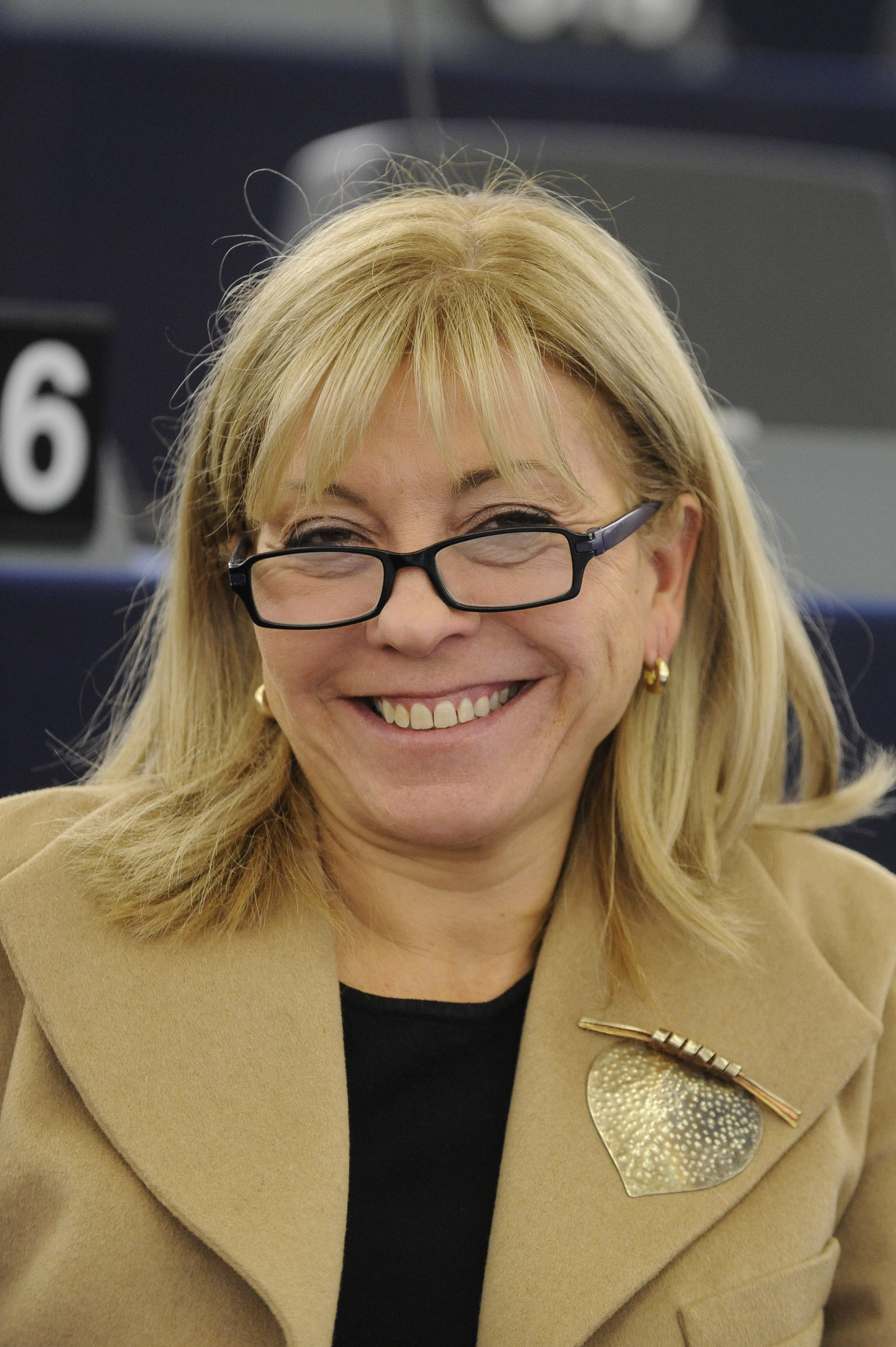

Anni Podimata is a Greek politician who served as Vice-President of the European Parliament and Member of Sixth European Parliament and Seventh European Parliament.
