= Roselyne Lefrançois =

French politician

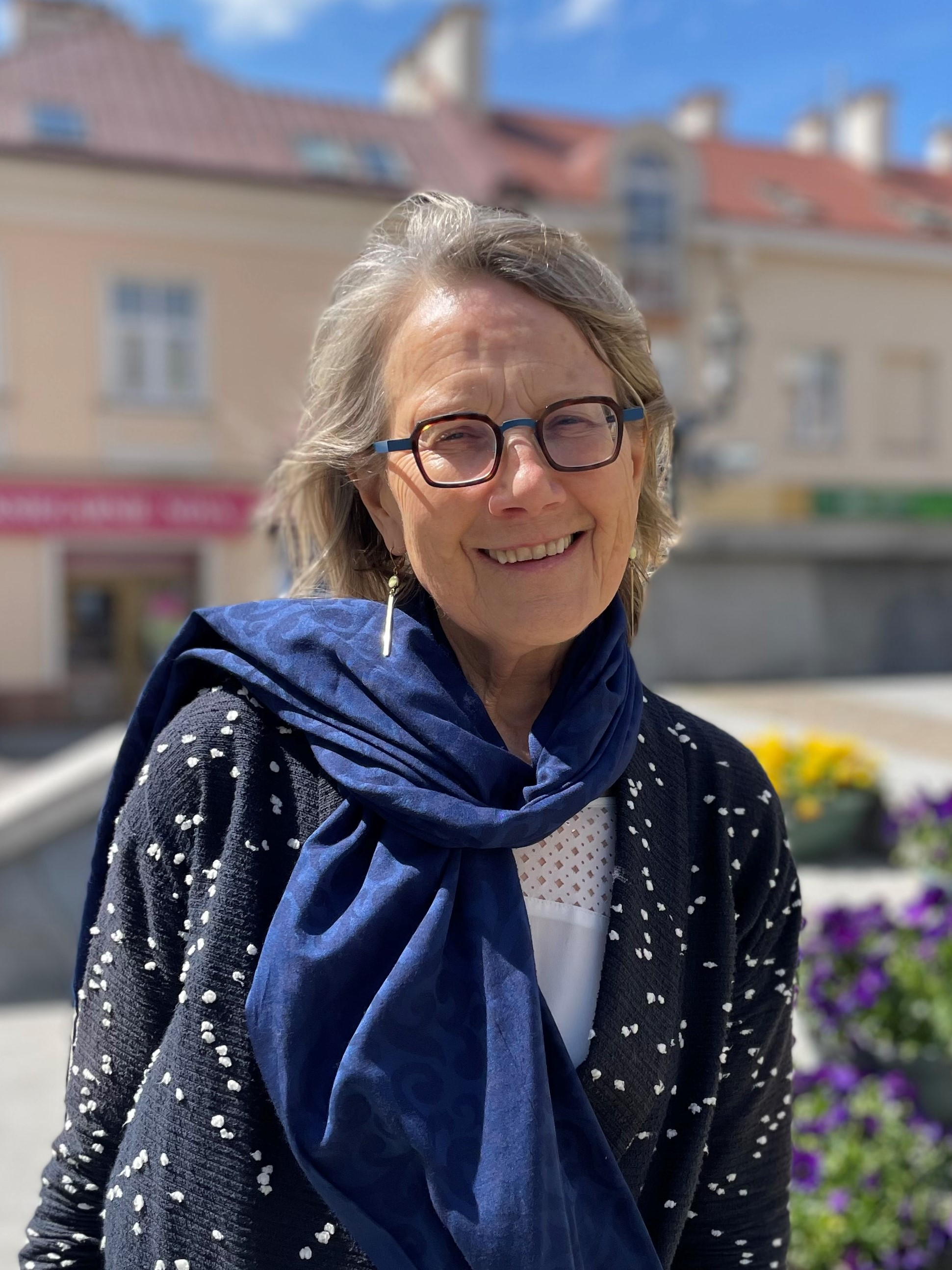

Member of the European Parliament
- In office 4 July 2007 – 13 July 2009
- Preceded by: Marie-Line Reynaud
- Constituency: West France

Personal details
- Born: 20 June 1950 (age 76) Saint-Malo, Brittany, France
- Party: Socialist Party
- Occupation: Politician

Roselyne Lefrançois is a French politician and former Member of the European Parliament (MEP). She represented West France for the Socialist Party from 2007 until 2009. She was appointed to fill the vacancy caused by the resignation of Marie-Line Reynaud

== Parliamentary service ==
- Member, Committee on Women's Rights and Gender Equality
- Member, Committee on Civil Liberties, Justice and Home Affairs
- Member, Delegation for relations with the United States
