= Manolis Mavrommatis =

Greek politician

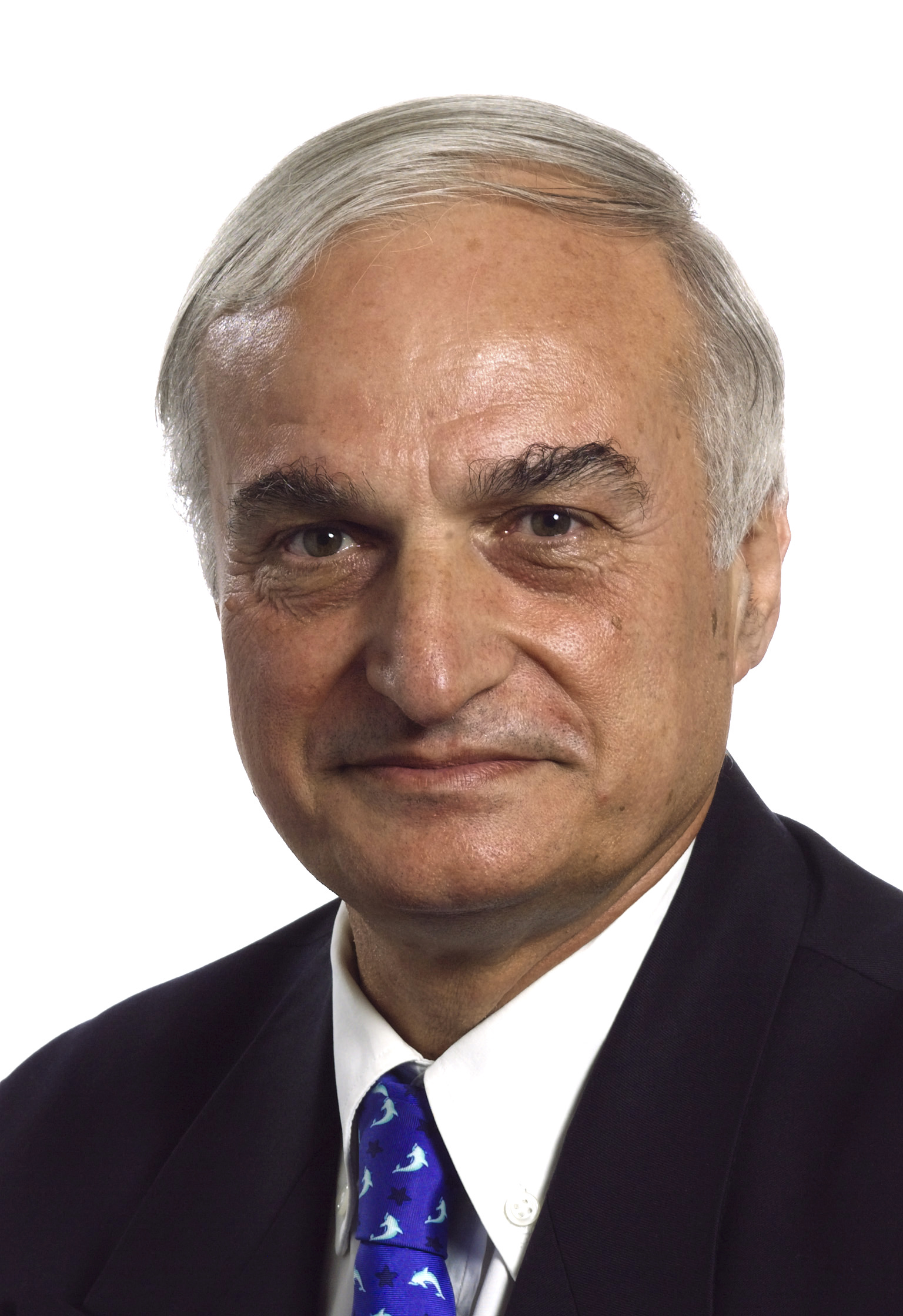

Manolis Mavrommatis (born August 15, 1941) is a Greek politician and former Member of the European Parliament (MEP) for New Democracy, belonging to the European People's Party.

Born in Platanias, Crete, he studied sociology in the University of Rome, as well as Cinema, Theater and Radio techniques. He started off as a director for short-films and documentaries and moved on to directing theatrical acts for both the radio and the stage. In 1975 he started working as a sports journalist and covered a variety of major sporting events (Olympic Games, FIFA World Cup, UEFA European Championship etc.) up until his election to the European Parliament in 2004.

He is married to actress Rena Venieri and has a son, Michael Mavrommatis.
