= Antonio De Blasio =

Hungarian politician

Antonio De Blasio MEP

Member of the European Parliament
- In office 31 July 2006 – 13 July 2009
- Constituency: Hungary

Personal details
- Born: 5 September 1955 (age 70) Pécs, Hungary
- Party: Hungarian; Fidesz; EU; European People's Party
- Children: Roberta; Domenico
- Education: University of Pécs; University of Szeged

Antonio De Blasio (born 5 September 1955) is a Hungarian politician and former Member of the European Parliament (MEP) with the Fidesz, part of the European People's Party and was a member of the European Parliament's Committee on Regional Development.

He became MEP on 31 July 2006, succeeding István Pálfi, who died on 15 July 2006.

== Personal life ==
He is married and has two children, Roberta and Domenico. He lives in Pécs, Hungary.

== See also ==
- 2004 European Parliament election in Hungary
