= Joop Post =

Dutch businessman and politician (born 1950)

Johannes (Joop) Post (born 5 July 1950, in Velsen) is a Dutch businessman and former politician.
