= Viorica Moisuc =

Romanian politician (born 1934)

Viorica Georgeta Pompilia Moisuc (born 8 April 1934) is a Romanian politician and Member of the European Parliament. Moisuc is a member of the Greater Romania Party, part of the Identity/Sovereignty/Transparency group, and became an MEP on 1 January 2007 with the accession of Romania to the European Union.
