= Donata Gottardi =

Italian politician

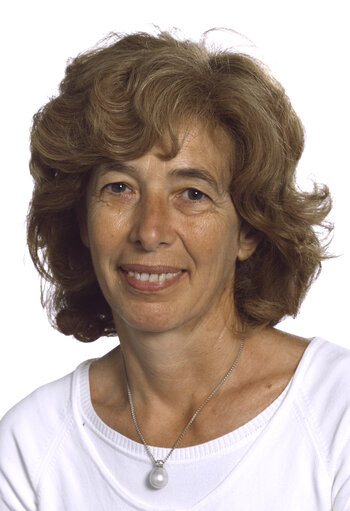
GOTTARDI Donata

Donata Maria Assunta Gottardi (born October 17, 1950, in Verona) is an Italian politician. She was a member of the European Parliament from May 8, 2006, when she took up a seat vacated after the 2006 Italian general election, until the 2009 European elections. She represented the Olive Tree coalition within the Party of European Socialists parliamentary group.
