= Vincenzo Aita =

Italian politician

Vincenzo Aita (born September 14, 1948, in Eboli) is an Italian politician and a member of the European Parliament with the Partito della Rifondazione Comunista, part of the European United Left–Nordic Green Left. He sits on the Committee on Economic and Monetary Affairs and is a substitute on the Committee on Agriculture and Rural Development.

From 1972 to 1976, Aita was a member of the Salerno Provincial Committee of the Alleanza Contadini Party. From 1976 to 1980 he was a member of the Central Committee of the Italian Communist Party, and he was a member of the Central Committee of the Italian Communist Party from 1975 to 1983. From 1983 to 1996, he was a municipal councillor for Eboli. He was a Deputy Mayor of Eboli with responsibility for finance from 1987 to 1988. From 1980 to 1985, he was a member of the Campania Regional Council. Most recently, from June 2000 until September 2004, he was a member of the Campania Regional Executive with responsibility for agriculture.
