= Ulrike Rodust =

German politician (born 1949)

Ulrike Rodust MEP
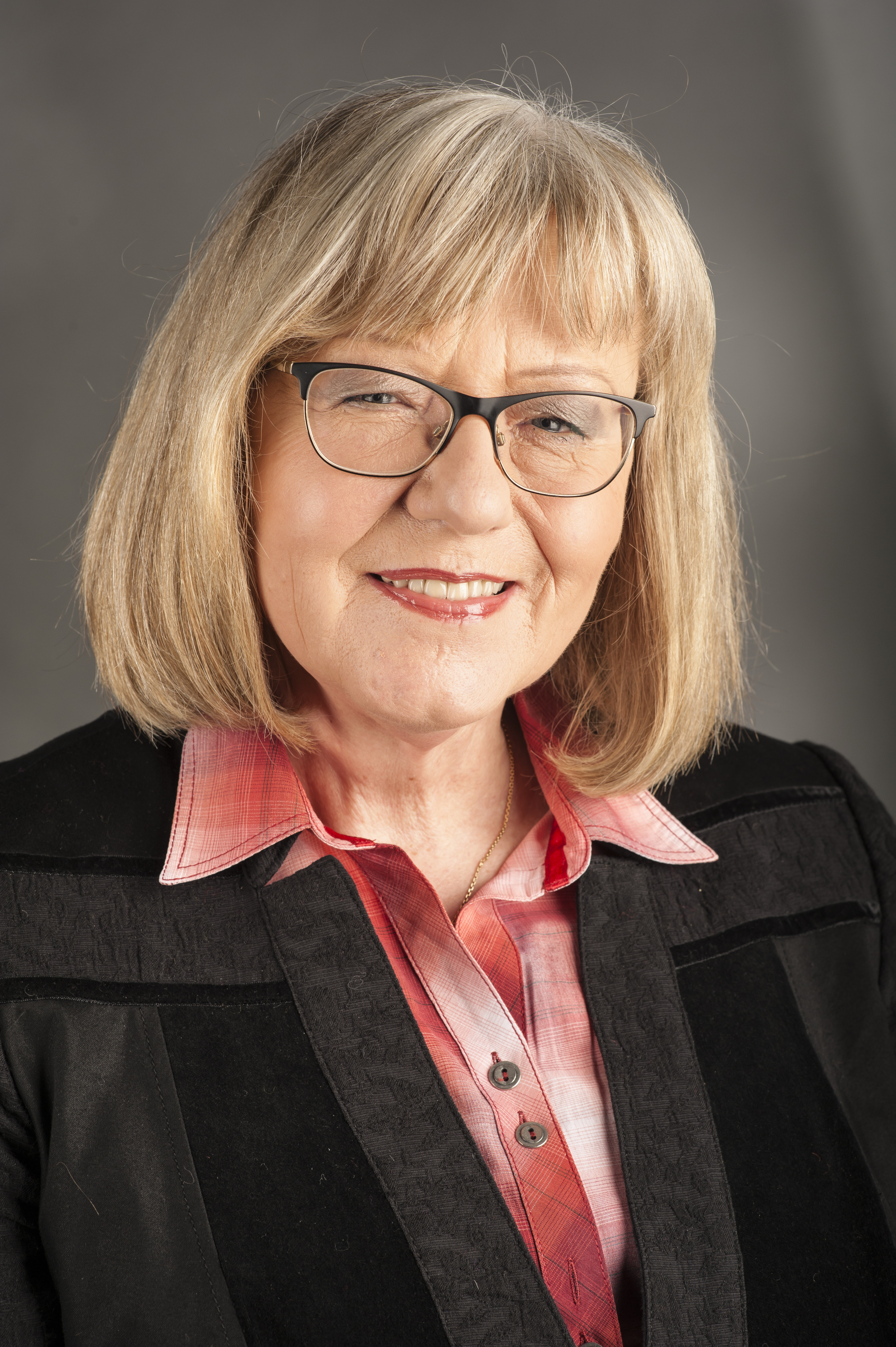
- Ulrike Rodust

Member of the European Parliament
- In office 29 August 2008 – 2019
- Constituency: Germany

Personal details
- Born: 4 June 1949 (age 76) Quakenbrück, Lower Saxony, Germany
- Party: German; Social Democratic Party; European Union; Party of European Socialists

Ulrike Rodust (born 4 June 1949) is a German politician who served as Member of the European Parliament (MEP) from 2008 until 2019. She is a member of the Social Democratic Party, part of the Party of European Socialists.

Between 1993 and 2008, Rodust was a member of the Landtag of Schleswig-Holstein.

== Parliamentary service ==
- Member, Committee on Fisheries (2008-2019)
- Member, Delegation for relations with the countries of Central America (2009-2019)
- Member, Delegation to the Euro-Latin American Parliamentary Assembly (2009-2019)
- Member, Delegation to the EU-Former Yugoslav Republic of Macedonia Joint Parliamentary Committee (2008-2009)
- Member, Committee on Transport and Tourism (2008-2009)
- Member, Committee on Agriculture and Rural Development (2009-2014)

In addition to her committee assignments, Rodust serves as a member of the European Parliament Intergroup on Western Sahara and of the European Parliament Intergroup on LGBT Rights. She is one of the vice chairs of the European Parliament Intergroup on Seas, Rivers, Islands and Coastal Areas. In 2013, she represented the Parliament in the negotiations on a reform of the Common Fisheries Policy (CFP) for the budgetary period of 2014-2020.

In May 2018, Rodust announced that she would not stand in the 2019 European elections but instead resign from active politics by the end of the parliamentary term.
