= Cornelis Visser =

Dutch politician (born 1965)

Cornelis L. Visser (born 14 November 1965, Stellendam) is a Dutch politician. Between 2017 and 2025 he was mayor of Katwijk.
