= Věra Flasarová =

Czech politician

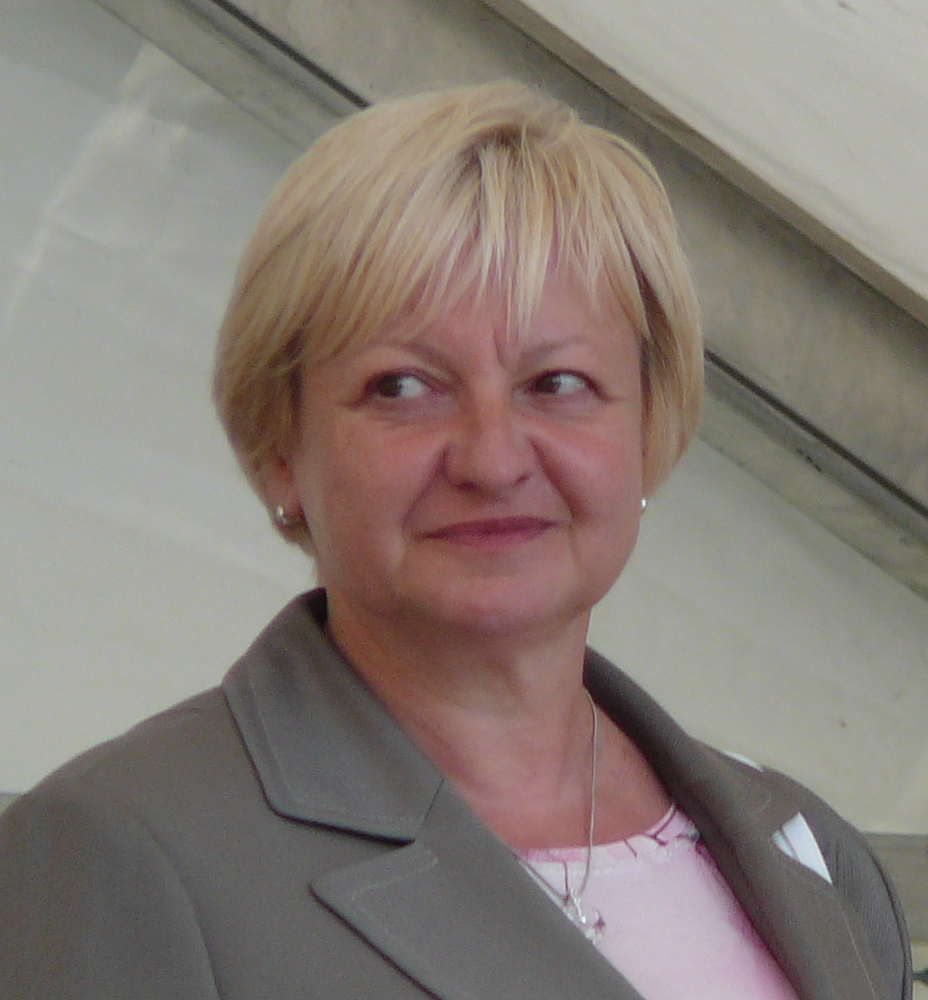
- Věra Flasarová, 2009

Member of the European Parliament for Czech Republic
- In office 20 July 2004 – 13 July 2009
- In office 13 January 2014 – 30 June 2014

Personal details
- Born: 19 December 1952 (age 73) Ostrava, Czechoslovakia
- Party: Communist Party of Czechoslovakia; Communist Party of Bohemia and Moravia
- Education: VSB – Technical University of Ostrava

Věra Flasarová (born 19 December 1952 in Ostrava) is a Czech politician and Member of the European Parliament for the Communist Party of Bohemia and Moravia; Part of the European United Left–Nordic Green Left party group in the European Parliament. She was elected initially in the period 2004–2009, but she entered the European Parliament in January 2014 replacing Vladimír Remek who became the Czech ambassador to Moscow.
