= Jürgen Zimmerling =

German politician (1952 - 2005)

Jürgen Zimmerling (born 17 February 1952 in Oberhausen, died 8 October 2005) was a German politician and a Member of the European Parliament during its 5th and 6th terms. He was a member of the Christian Democratic Union of Germany, which is affiliated with the Group of the European People's Party (Christian Democrats) and European Democrats in the European Parliament.

He served on the Committee on Development and Cooperation and later on the Committee on Development. He was a member of the delegation to the EU-Malta Joint Parliamentary Committee, a member from the European Parliament to the Joint Parliamentary Assembly of the Agreement between the African, Caribbean and Pacific States and the European Union, and a member of the delegation for relations with the Gulf States, including Yemen.

He was a substitute for the Committee on Legal Affairs and the Internal Market, the delegation to the EU-Cyprus Joint Parliamentary Committee, the Committee on Industry, External Trade, Research and Energy, the Committee on Economic and Monetary Affairs, the Subcommittee on Human Rights, and the delegation to the ACP-EU Joint Parliamentary Assembly.
