= Roland Gewalt =

German politician and member of the European Parliament (born 1958)

Roland Gewalt (born 2 April 1958 in Berlin) is a German politician who was a Member of the European Parliament from 2005 until 2009. He has been a member of the Christian Democratic Union of Germany since 1980, which is affiliated with the Group of the European People's Party (Christian Democrats) and European Democrats in the European Parliament. During his time in parliament, he was a member of the Committee on Transport and Tourism and the Delegation for relations with South Africa. He was a substitute for the Committee on Legal Affairs and the delegation to the ACP-EU Joint Parliamentary Assembly.

== Education and early career ==
Gewalt studied law at the Free University of Berlin and took his first state law examination in 1987. He worked as a trainee at the Berlin Court of Appeal district and took his second state law examination in 1990. He was the section head for property law at Treuhandanstalt, and subsequently the federal institute for special assets of associations, until 1997. He was head of the property department of a housing association.

== Political career ==
From 1983 to 1985, Gewalt was the chair of the Berlin-Reinickendorf Junge Union. He has been a member of the Reinickendorf Christian Democratic Union Executive Committee since 1983 and a member of Christian Democratic Union Regional Executive in Berlin since 2005. He has been a member of the Young European Federalists and Europa Union since 1977. He became regional chairman of the Young European Federalists in Berlin in 1980, and from 1987 to 1990 he was a member of the main committee of Europa Union in Berlin.

From 1985 to 1990, Roland was a member of the district assembly of Berlin-Reinickendorf. He has been the press secretary of the Christian Democratic Union Group since 1988. From 1990 he has been a member of the Berlin Chamber of Deputies, and the deputy group leader between 1995 and 1998. He was the parliamentary business manager for the Christian Democratic Union Group between 1998 and 2001, the foreigners' policy spokesperson between 1992 and 1998, and the home affairs spokesperson between 1998 and 2002.

From 2002 to 2005, Gewalt was a member of the Bundestag. At the 2005 election, he unsuccessfully contested the Berlin-Lichtenberg constituency. He is chair of the Berlin regional group of the CDU-CSU Group.
