= Nikos Vakalis =

Greek politician (1939–2017)

Nikos Vakalis (Greek: Νίκος Βακάλης, December 1939 – 23 March 2017) was a Greek politician who served as Member of the European Parliament (MEP) from 2004 to 2009.

== Biography ==
He studied Physics with a scholarship at the Aristotle University of Thessaloniki. He served as a reservist officer (head of Faculty) in the Artillery. He founded the Frontistirio Vakalis in 1967. After studying the British educational system he founded in 1972 the College of Advance Education collaborating with the British examining bodies Cambridge, AEB and JMB.

In 1999 he extended his activities founding the publishing house Publications Vakali. He also entered the market of Information Technology with the founding of the training company e-master, and the company executive training market with the founding of the Business Training Centre.

He wrote and published the books "About Friction", "Mechanics", "Electricity" and "Thermodynamics" and many collections of exercises.

He was married to Helen Mpousiou and had two sons, Andonis who is 38 (Bachelor and Master in Finance from the University of London, England. Master in Educational Management from the Institute of Education, University of London, England) and Manolis who is 33 (Bachelor in Information Technology from the University of Sussex, England).

Vakalis died on 23 March 2017, at the age of 77.

== Trade-union and Political activities ==
He was:

- Chairman of Students of Physics of the Aristotle University of Thessaloniki.
- A founding member of New Democracy, Thessaloniki
- General Secretary of the Management Committee of New Democracy (Thessaloniki Prefecture).
- From 1998 to 2004 he was Chairman of the Management Committee of New Democracy (Thessaloniki Prefecture).

== European Parliament ==
- Member of the Group of the European People's Party (Christian Democrats) and European Democrats
- Member of the Committee on Industry, Research and Energy
- Committee on Regional Development (Substitute)
- Member of the Delegation to the EU-India Joint Parliamentary Committee

Foreign Languages: English
