= List of members of the European Parliament for Austria, 2009–2014 =

This is a list of the 17 members of the European Parliament for Austria in the 2009 to 2014 session. One person from Alliance for the Future and one from Social Democratic Party entered the Parliament in December 2011, bringing the number of MEPs to 19.

== Lists ==
| Name | National party | EP Group |
|---|---|---|
| Martin Ehrenhauser | Hans-Peter Martin's List | NI |
| Karin Kadenbach | Social Democratic Party | S&D |
| Othmar Karas | People's Party | EPP |
| Elisabeth Köstinger | People's Party | EPP |
| Jörg Leichtfried | Social Democratic Party | S&D |
| Eva Lichtenberger | The Greens–The Green Alternative | G–EFA |
| Ulrike Lunacek | The Greens–The Green Alternative | G–EFA |
| Hans-Peter Martin | Hans-Peter Martin's List | NI |
| Andreas Mölzer | Freedom Party | NI |
| Franz Obermayr | Freedom Party | NI |
| Hella Ranner | People's Party | EPP |
| Evelyn Regner | Social Democratic Party | S&D |
| Paul Rübig | People's Party | EPP |
| Richard Seeber | People's Party | EPP |
| Ewald Stadler | Alliance for the Future | NI |
| Ernst Strasser | People's Party | EPP |
| Hannes Swoboda | Social Democratic Party | S&D |
| Angelika Werthmann | Hans-Peter Martin's List | NI |
| Josef Weidenholzer | Social Democratic Party | S&D |
