= 2014 European Parliament election in Austria =

- 25 May 2014

All 18 Austrian seats to the European Parliament
- Turnout: 45.39% (▼0.58pp)
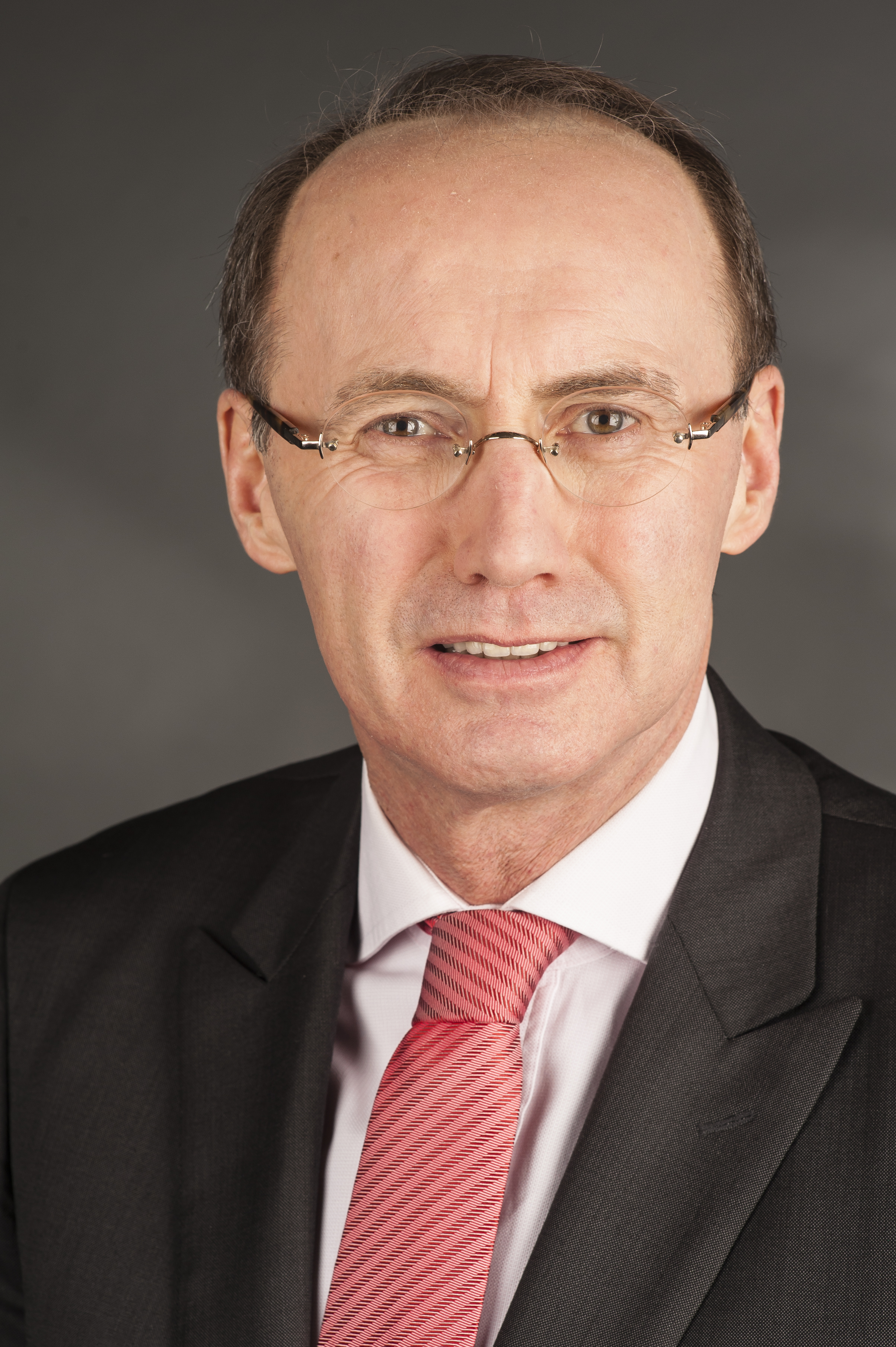

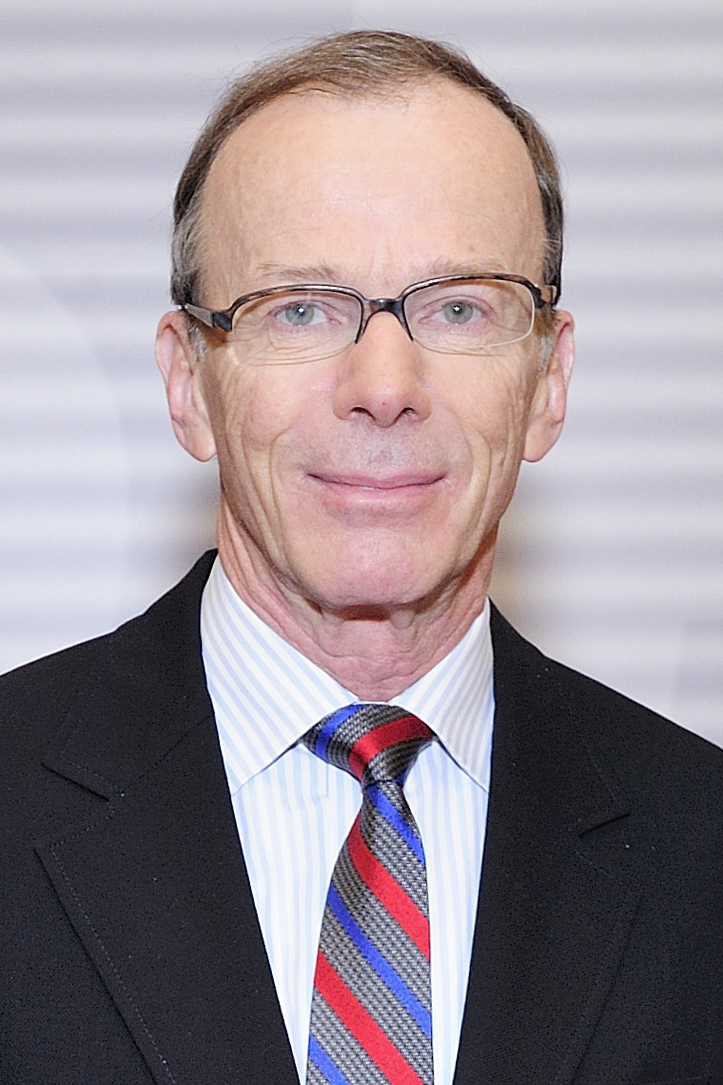

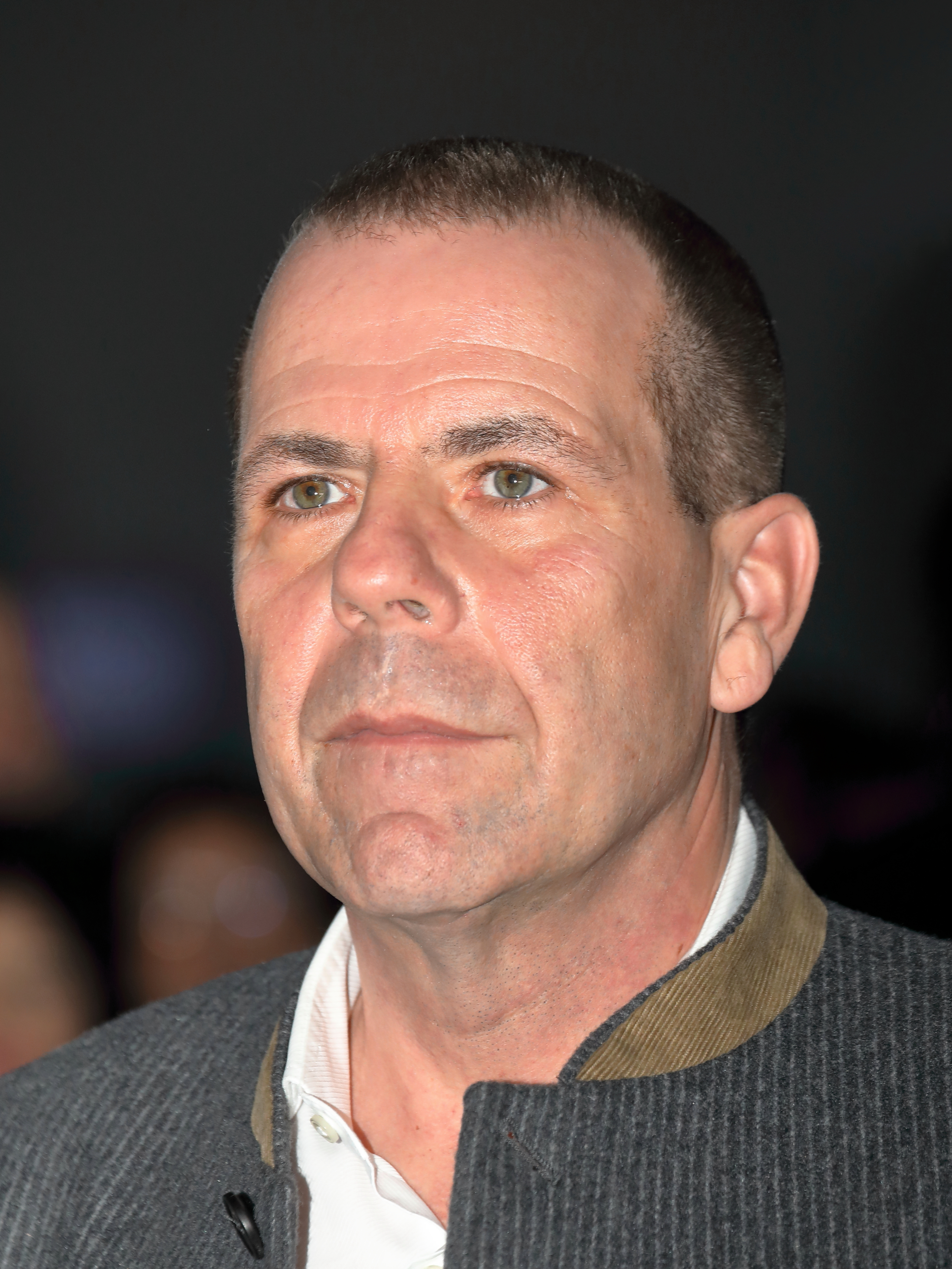

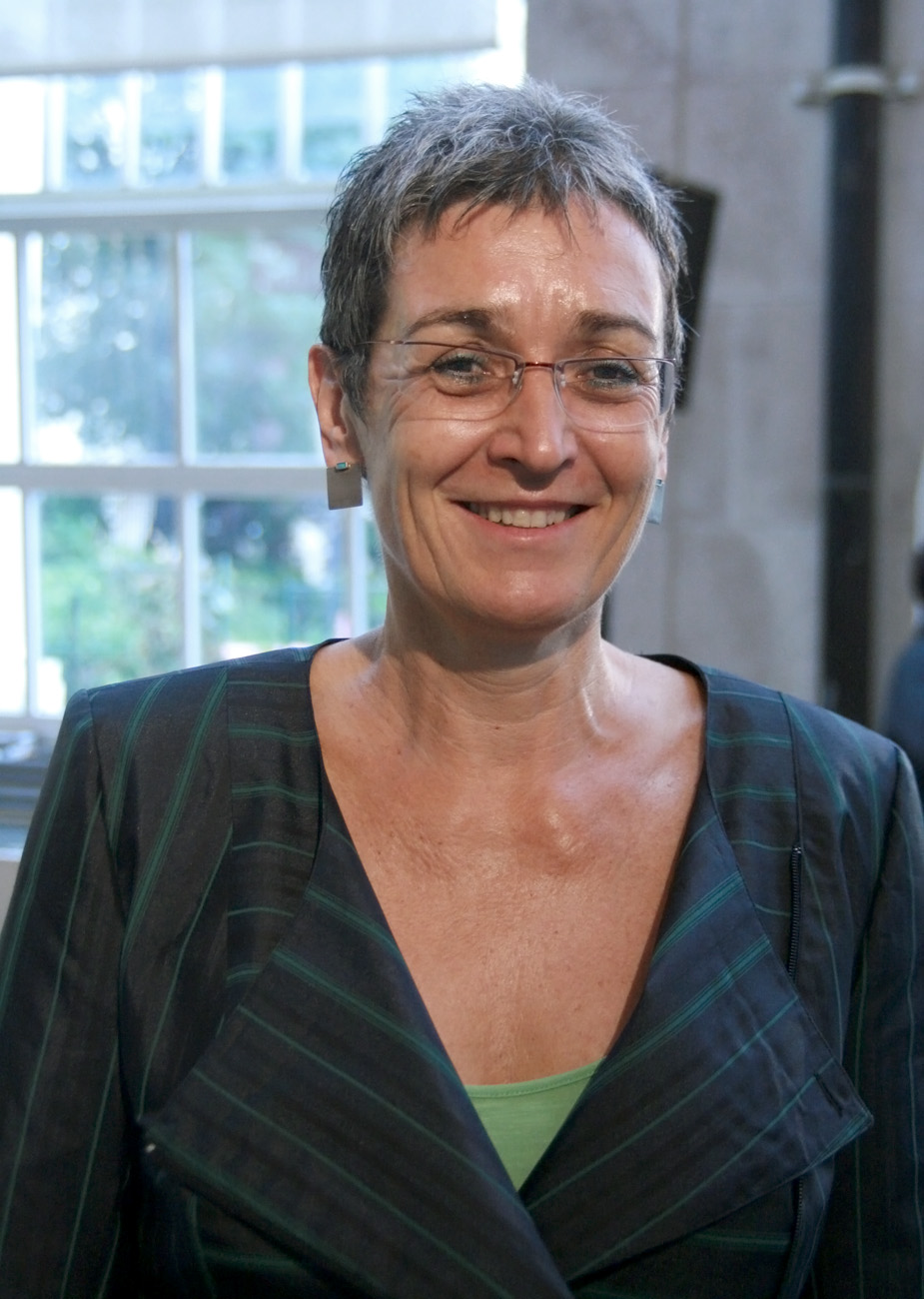

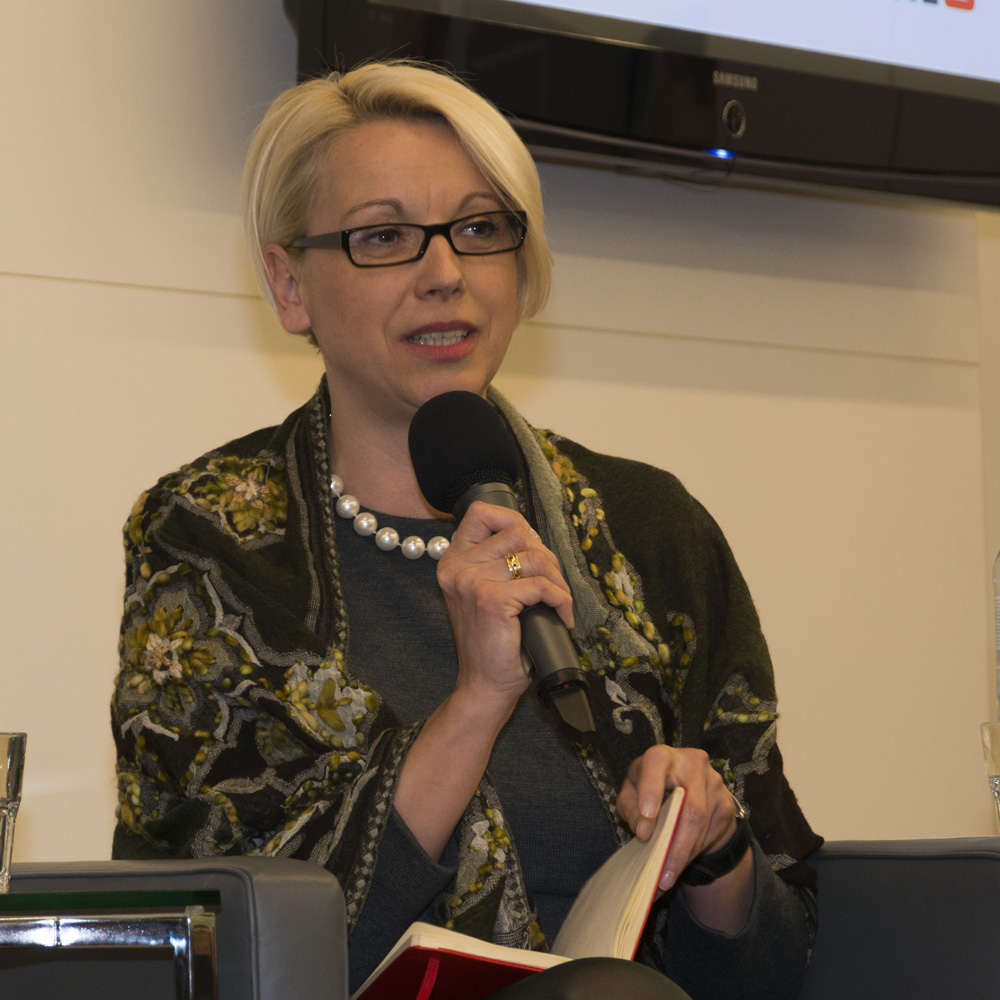
| | First party | Second party | Third party |
|---|---|---|---|
| Leader | Othmar Karas | Eugen Freund | Harald Vilimsky |
| Party | ÖVP | SPÖ | FPÖ |
| Alliance | EPP | PES | EAF |
| Last election | 29.98%, 6 seats | 23.74%, 5 seats | 12.71%, 2 seats |
| Seats won | 5 | 5 | 4 |
| Seat change | ▼1 | Steady | ▲2 |
| Popular vote | 761,896 | 680,180 | 556,835 |
| Percentage | 26.98% | 24.09% | 19.72% |
| Swing | ▼3.00pp | ▲0.35pp | ▲7.01pp |
| | Fourth party | Fifth party |
| Leader | Ulrike Lunacek | Angelika Mlinar |
| Party | Greens | NEOS |
| Alliance | European Greens | ALDE |
| Last election | 9.93%, 2 seats | – |
| Seats won | 3 | 1 |
| Seat change | ▲1 | New |
| Popular vote | 410,089 | 229,781 |
| Percentage | 14.52% | 8.14% |
| Swing | ▲4.59pp | New |
- Results by state

The 2014 European Parliament election in Austria was held on 25 May 2014 in Austria. As a result of the Lisbon Treaty Austria held 19 seats in the European Parliament, but with Croatia joining the Union in 2013, Austria's allocation was reduced to 18 seats.

== Background ==
Three Members of the European Parliament (MEPs) decided to stand in the election again, but not for their original parties. They are Martin Ehrenhauser (former member of Hans-Peter Martin's List), Ewald Stadler (formerly top candidate for the Alliance for the Future of Austria) and Angelika Werthmann (former member of Hans-Peter Martin's List).

Ehrenhauser is now top candidate for the left-wing electoral alliance "Europe Different" (Europa Anders), which includes the Communists and the Pirate Party.

Stadler founded the eurosceptic "Reform Conservatives" (Die Reformkonservativen, REKOS), who intend to join the Europe of Freedom and Democracy group in European Parliament.

Angelika Werthmann, who was part of the ALDE group between 2012 and 2014, had originally planned to contest the election for NEOS, but in early 2014 she claimed that "the buying of votes" had occurred at the NEOS party caucus for the 2013 national election. She withdrew her NEOS-candidacy for the 2014 European election in January 2014. The Alliance for the Future of Austria (BZÖ) initially planned to field Ulrike Haider-Quercia, daughter of the late party founder Jörg Haider, as their frontrunner. She withdrew on 8 April, complaining that the party would not accept her "independent policy". Instead of her, the BZÖ's new top candidate is Angelika Werthmann. She was also excluded from the liberal ALDE group in the European Parliament after joining the BZÖ.

The new liberal party NEOS (represented in the national parliament since 2013) is contesting the election. Angelika Mlinar was elected as its top candidate after its caucus in February 2014.

Team Stronach, another successful new party in the 2013 national election, announced on 8 April 2014 that they would not contest the election.

On 25 March 2014 MEP Hans-Peter Martin, the leader of Hans-Peter Martin's List, announced that he would no longer be contesting European Elections.

A small party called "EU-STOP" also managed to collect the 2600 signatures necessary to be included on the election ballot. Their main goal is Austria's exit from the EU resulting in a fully neutral and self-determined country, a return to the Austrian schilling and strict border controls to limit cross-border crime.

== Electoral system ==
Voters who so chose were allowed to cast their vote either by absentee ballot or postal ballot. Postal ballots had to arrive at the district voting commission no later than 5 pm on election day. Before the 2009 election, 309,200 voters requested absentee or postal ballots. For the 2014 election, the number was 444,057.

According to the final figures, a total of 6,410,602 people were eligible to vote in this election, an increase from 6,362,761 people in the 2009 election. 3,322,498 women (2009: 3,314,816) and 3,088,104 men (2009: 3,047,945) were eligible to vote. Included in these totals are 34,773 Austrians living abroad and 33,184 foreign EU-citizens living in Austria.

Poll opening and closing times on election day were set individually by each municipality. Poll closing times can be no later than 17:00.

== Contesting parties ==
There were 9 parties contesting the election. They are ranked here as they appeared on the ballot paper:

- ÖVP – (Österreichische Volkspartei – Liste Othmar Karas) – Austrian People's Party
- SPÖ – (Sozialdemokratische Partei Österreichs) – Social Democratic Party of Austria
- FPÖ – (Freiheitliche Partei Österreichs (FPÖ) – Die Freiheitlichen) – Freedom Party of Austria
- GRÜNE – (Die Grünen – Die Grüne Alternative) – The Greens – The Green Alternative
- BZÖ – (BZÖ – Liste Mag. Werthmann) – Alliance for the Future of Austria
- NEOS – (NEOS Das Neue Österreich und Liberales Forum) – NEOS – The New Austria
- REKOS – (Die Reformkonservativen – Liste Ewald Stadler) – The Reform Conservatives
- ANDERS – (Europa Anders – KPÖ, Piratenpartei, Wandel und Unabhängige) – Europe Different (Communist Party of Austria, Pirate Party of Austria, The Change and independents)
- EUSTOP – (EU-Austritt, Direkte Demokratie, Neutralität, EU-Stop) – EU Stop

== Opinion polls ==
| Date | Polling Firm | ÖVP | SPÖ | FPÖ | Grüne | BZÖ | NEOS | REKOS | ANDERS | EU-STOP | Others | Lead |
|---|---|---|---|---|---|---|---|---|---|---|---|---|
| 17 May 2014 | Unique Research | 26 | 25 | 20 | 13 | – | 10 | – | – | – | 6 | 1 |
| 15 May 2014 | Gallup | 23 | 24 | 21 | 12.5 | 1.5 | 13 | 1 | 2.5 | – | – | 1 |
| 15 May 2014 | Peter Hajek POS | 26 | 25 | 20 | 12 | 1 | 11 | 1 | 3 | – | 1 | 1 |
| 14 May 2014 | Market | 22 | 23 | 21 | 16 | 1 | 14 | – | 1 | – | 1 | 1 |
| 11 May 2014 | OGM | 25 | 26 | 20 | 13 | – | 11 | – | – | – | 5 | 1 |
| 10 May 2014 | Gallup | 24 | 24 | 20 | 13 | 2 | 12 | 1 | 3 | – | 1 | – |
| 9 May 2014 | Unique Research | 25 | 24 | 20 | 12 | 1 | 13 | 2 | 3 | 0 | – | 1 |
| 8 May 2014 | meinungsraum.at | 24 | 23 | 21 | 12 | 1.5 | 14 | 1.5 | 1.5 | 1.5 | – | 1 |
| 1 May 2014 | Gallup | 24 | 24 | 19 | 13 | 1 | 14 | 1 | 3 | – | 1 | – |
| 27 April 2014 | Gallup | 23 | 24 | 20 | 13 | 1 | 13 | 1 | 2 | – | 3 | 1 |
| 12 April 2014 | Unique Research | 26 | 24 | 18 | 13 | – | 14 | – | – | – | 5 | 2 |
| 10 April 2014 | Gallup | 24 | 24 | 19 | 13 | 1 | 13 | 2 | 2 | – | 2 | – |
| 4 April 2014 | Unique Research | 26 | 23 | 19 | 12 | 2 | 14 | 1 | 1 | – | 2 | 3 |

== Results ==
| Party | Votes | % | Seats | +/– |
|---|---|---|---|---|
| Austrian People's Party | 761,896 | 26.98 | 5 | –1 |
| Social Democratic Party of Austria | 680,180 | 24.09 | 5 | 0 |
| Freedom Party of Austria | 556,835 | 19.72 | 4 | +2 |
| The Greens – The Green Alternative | 410,089 | 14.52 | 3 | +1 |
| NEOS – The New Austria | 229,781 | 8.14 | 1 | New |
| EU-STOP | 77,897 | 2.76 | 0 | New |
| Europe Different (KPÖ–PIRAT–WANDEL) | 60,451 | 2.14 | 0 | New |
| The Reform Conservatives | 33,224 | 1.18 | 0 | New |
| Alliance for the Future of Austria | 13,208 | 0.47 | 0 | –1 |
| Total | 2,823,561 | 100.00 | 18 | –1 |
| Valid votes | 2,823,561 | 97.05 | | |
| Invalid/blank votes | 85,936 | 2.95 | | |
| Total votes | 2,909,497 | 100.00 | | |
| Registered voters/turnout | 6,410,602 | 45.39 | | |
Source: Ministry of the Interior
