= Eugen Freund =

Austrian politician

Eugen Freund MEP
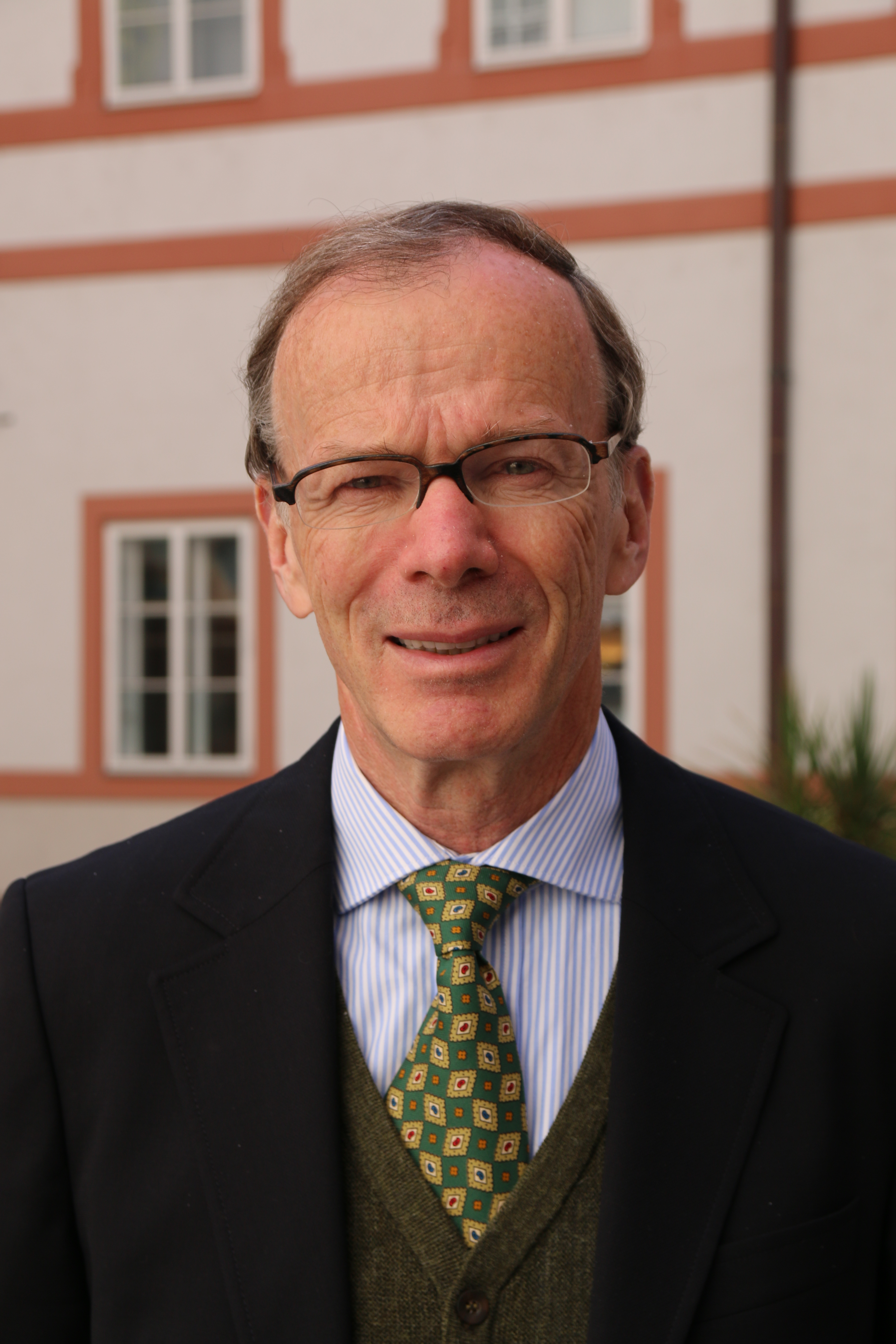

Member of the European Parliament
- In office 1 July 2014 – 2019
- Constituency: Austria

Personal details
- Born: 15 April 1951 (age 75) Vienna, Austria
- Party: Austrian: Social Democratic Party; EU: Party of European Socialists
- Education: Vienna University
- Website: www.eugenfreund.eu

Eugen Freund (born 15 April 1951) is an Austrian politician who served as a Member of the European Parliament (MEP) from 2014 until 2019. He is a member of the Social Democratic Party, part of the Party of European Socialists.

== Professional career ==
A former press secretary for the Federal Ministry for Foreign Affairs of Austria under Minister Willibald Pahr, Freund joined the country's state broadcaster, ORF, in 1986 and among other posts was Washington correspondent and then presenter of the main evening news show until his retirement at the end of 2013.

== Member of the European Parliament, 2014–2019 ==
In January 2014, Austria's Social Democratic Party (SPÖ) named Freund as its top candidate for the 2014 European elections, succeeding Hannes Swoboda. As a Member of the European Parliament, he served on the Committee on Foreign Affairs, the Subcommittee on Security and Defence and the parliament's delegation for relations with the United States. In addition, he was a member of the European Parliament Intergroup on the Western Sahara.

In October, Freund joined the SPÖ as a member.

In 2018, Freund announced that he would not stand in the 2019 European elections but instead resign from active politics by the end of the parliamentary term.
