= Martin Ehrenhauser =

Austrian politician

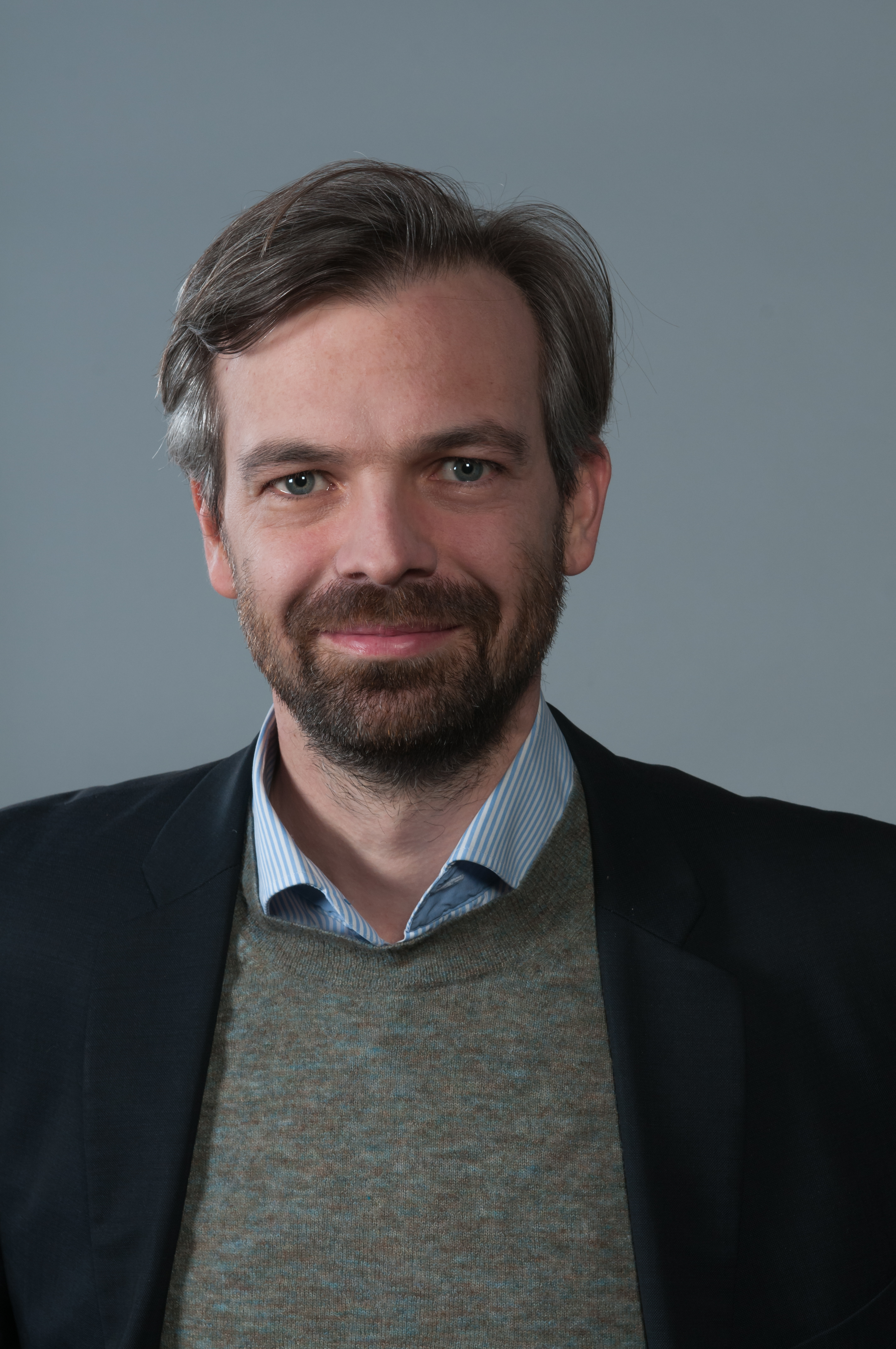
Martin Ehrenhauser (2014)

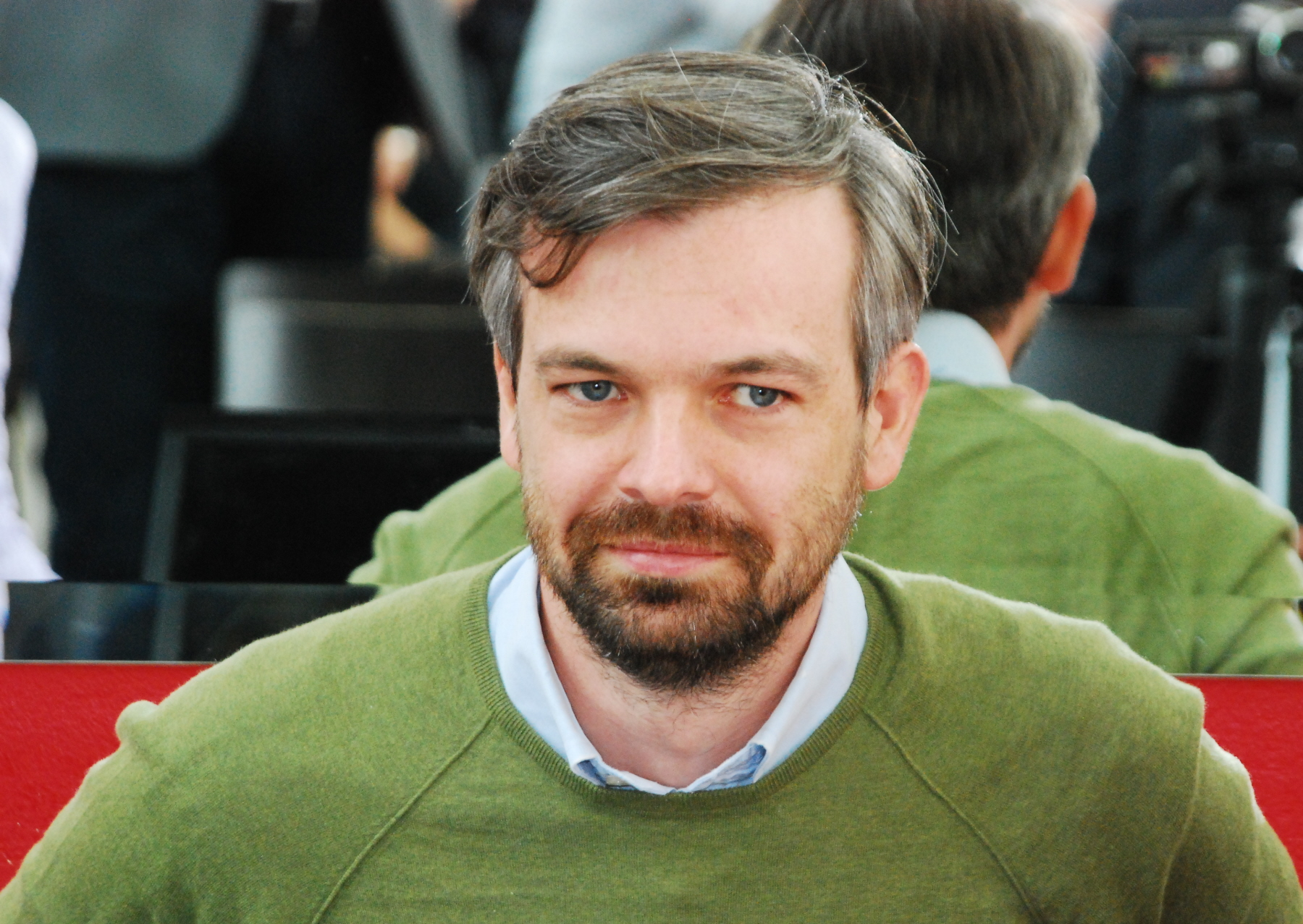
Martin Ehrenhauser (2012)

Video Introduction (German)

Martin Ehrenhauser (born September the 18, 1978) is an Austrian former Member of the European Parliament (MEP). He took his seat in the parliament in July 2009, when Hans-Peter Martin's List, an independent Austrian list led by author and MEP Hans-Peter Martin gained 17.7% of the Austrian vote in the 2009 elections for the European Parliament. He was defeated in 2014.

He, like his former mentor Hans-Peter Martin, has gained wide media attention for exposing 'scandals' in the European Union.

== Biography ==
Trained as a cook from 1993 to 1996, he spent the years until 2001 as a journeyman cook in Austria, Malaysia, and the United States. He received an MBA in economics from the University of Linz in 2005 and a Ph.D. in political science from the University of Loughborough in England in 2007.

He served internships in tourism for Österreich Werbung in Berlin and the Austria Center in Beirut. He was also politically active during his student years.

He worked as office manager for Hans-Peter Martin in Brussels and Strasbourg from 2007 to 2009, organizing the week of protests against the Treaty of Lisbon in Vienna, which attracted about 2000 protesters.

== Activity in the EU Parliament ==
He was a member of the Budgetary Control committee and has been present for 93 percent of roll-call votes. He voted strictly in line with his national party.

At the 2014 European election, he stood on the Europe Different list, which did not win any seats.
