= Karin Kadenbach =

Austrian politician (born 1958)

Karin Kadenbach MEP
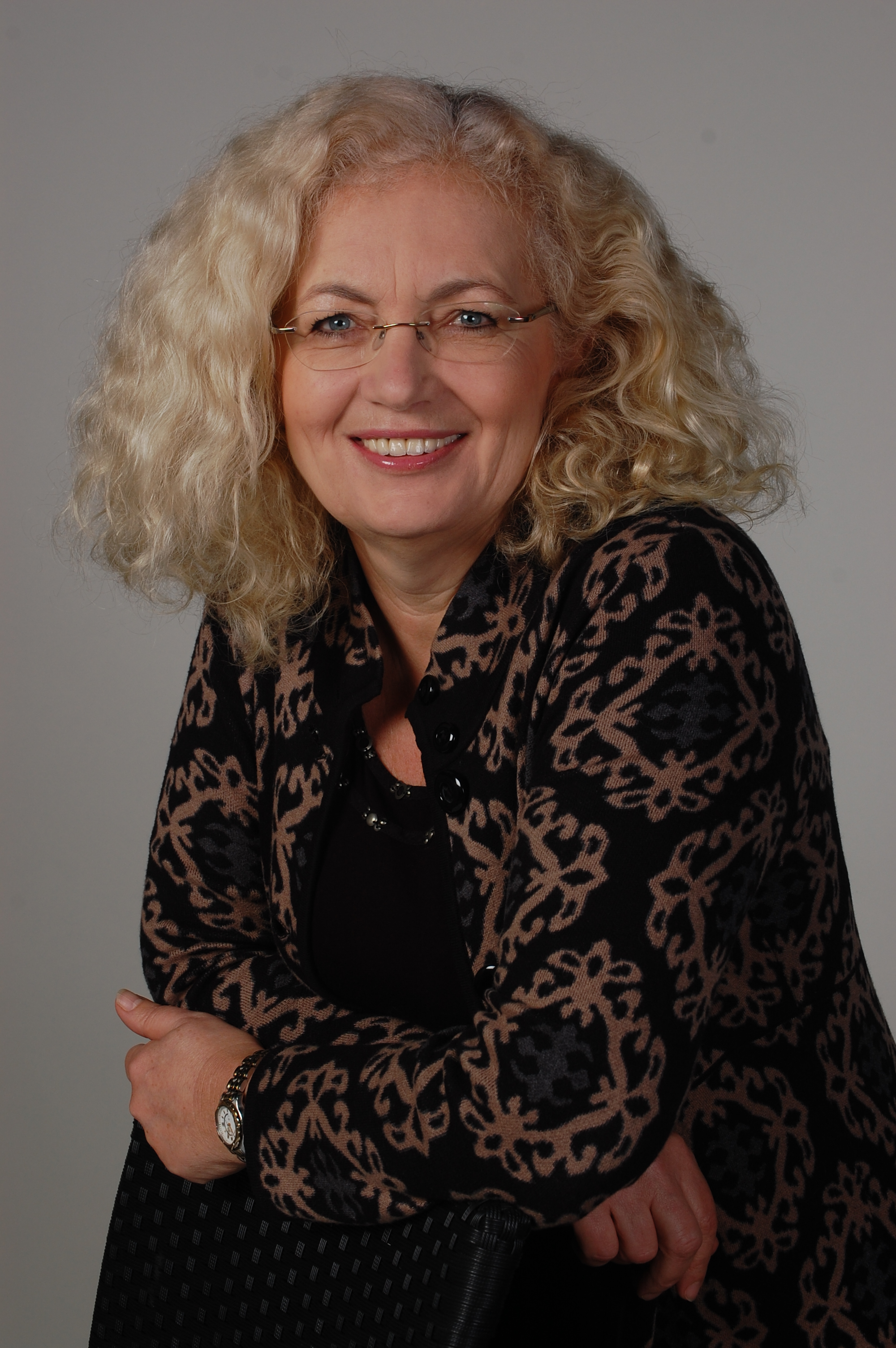

Member of the European Parliament
- In office 14 July 2009 – 1 July 2019
- Constituency: Austria

Personal details
- Born: Karin Kadenbach; 19 April 1958 (age 68) Vienna, Austria
- Party: Austrian: Social Democratic Party; EU: Party of European Socialists
- Children: 5
- Education: Vienna University of Economics and Business
- Website: www.karinkadenbach.at

Karin Kadenbach (born 19 April 1958) is an Austrian politician who served as a Member of the European Parliament (MEP) from 2009 to 2019. She is a member of the Social Democratic Party (SPÖ), part of the Party of European Socialists (PES).

== Life ==
Kadenbach was born in 1958 in Vienna, where she also went to school. She spent a school year at the Elmira Free Academy in New York (USA), where she gained the American High-School Diploma. After her school leaving examination she did a University course for advertisement and sales at the Economic University of Vienna. Starting from 1976 she worked in the advertising agency J. Walter Thompson.

Kadenbach has five children and lives in Brussels and in Lower Austria.

== Politics ==
From 1985 to 1994 Kadenbach worked as secretary of the women's group of the social democratic party in Lower Austria. In 1990 she was also elected in the municipal council of Großmugl.

In 2001 Kadenbach became member of the regional council of Lower Austria where she also was responsible for health and environment in the provincial government for from 2007 to 2008.

== Member of the European Parliament, 2009–2019 ==
Kadenbach first became a Member of the European Parliament in the 2009 European elections. Since then she is member of the Progressive Alliance of Socialists and Democrats in the European Parliament (S&D).

=== 7th parliamentary term (2009–14) ===
Video-Introduction

In her first term, Kadebach was member in the Committee on the Environment, Public Health and Food Safety (ENVI) and associated member for the Committee on Regional Development (REGI) and for the Committee on Agriculture and Rural Development (AGRI). Moreover she was in the parliament's delegation for relations with the countries of South Asia and substitute in the delegation for relations with the United States.

In October 2013, Kadenbach was rapporteur for the report on Eco-innovations – Jobs and Growth through environmental policy. With this report strategies for the creation on sustainable economic growth and connected also an increase for jobs were set. In 37 cases, she served as shadow rapporteur.

=== 8th parliamentary term (2015–19) ===
In the last term, Kadenbach was again member of the Committee on the Environment, Public Health and Food Safety (ENVI) and substitute in the Committee on Agriculture and Rural Development (AGRI) and in the Committee on Budgetary Control (CONT). Additionally, she served as vice president of the parliament's delegation for relations with Japan and substitute member in the Delegation for relations with the Korean Peninsula.

From 2016 until 2017, Kadenbach was a member of the Committee of Inquiry into Emission Measurements in the Automotive Sector, which is in charge of investigating possible violations of European law in the measurement of emissions in the automotive sector.

From November 2015 she was also rapporteur on the proposal for a regulation of the European Parliament and of the Council on official controls and other official activities performed to ensure the application of food and feed law, rules on animal health and welfare, plant health, plant reproductive material, plant protection products. Additionally she was shadow rapporteur on the mid-term review of the EU biodiversity strategy.

From 2015 until 2019, Kadenbach served as vice-president of the European Parliament Intergroup on the Welfare and Conservation of Animals. In addition, she was a member of the European Parliament Intergroup on the Western Sahara and the European Parliament Intergroup on LGBT Rights.

In 2014, Kadenbach supported Françoise Grossetête’s proposal to establish a European Parliament Intergroup on Health for Citizens, including stakeholders such as the European Cancer Patients Association and the Organisation for European Cancer Institutes. Since 2014, she has also been serving as co-chairwoman (alongside Mairead McGuinness) of the MEP Heart Group, a group of parliamentarians who have an interest in promoting measures that will help reduce the burden of cardiovascular diseases (CVD).

== Other activities ==
- International Forum Gastein (IFG), Vice-President

== Links ==
- Homepage of Karin Kadenbach
- Facebook-Page of Karin Kadenbach
- Personal profile of Karin Kadenbach in the European Parliament's database of members
- VoteWatch.eu: voting of Karin Kadenbach in the European Parliament
- Information about the Committee on Environment, Public Health and Food Safety ENVI
- Information about the Committee on Budgetary Control CONT
- Information about the Committee on Agriculture and Rural Development AGRI
- Homepage of the Animal Welfare Intergroup
- Homepage of LGTBI Intergroup
