= Hella Ranner =

Austrian politician (born 1951)

Hella Ranner (born 10 March 1951 in Graz, Austria) was a Member of the European Parliament (MEP) from 2009 to 2011, representing the Austrian People's Party and the European People's Party Group.

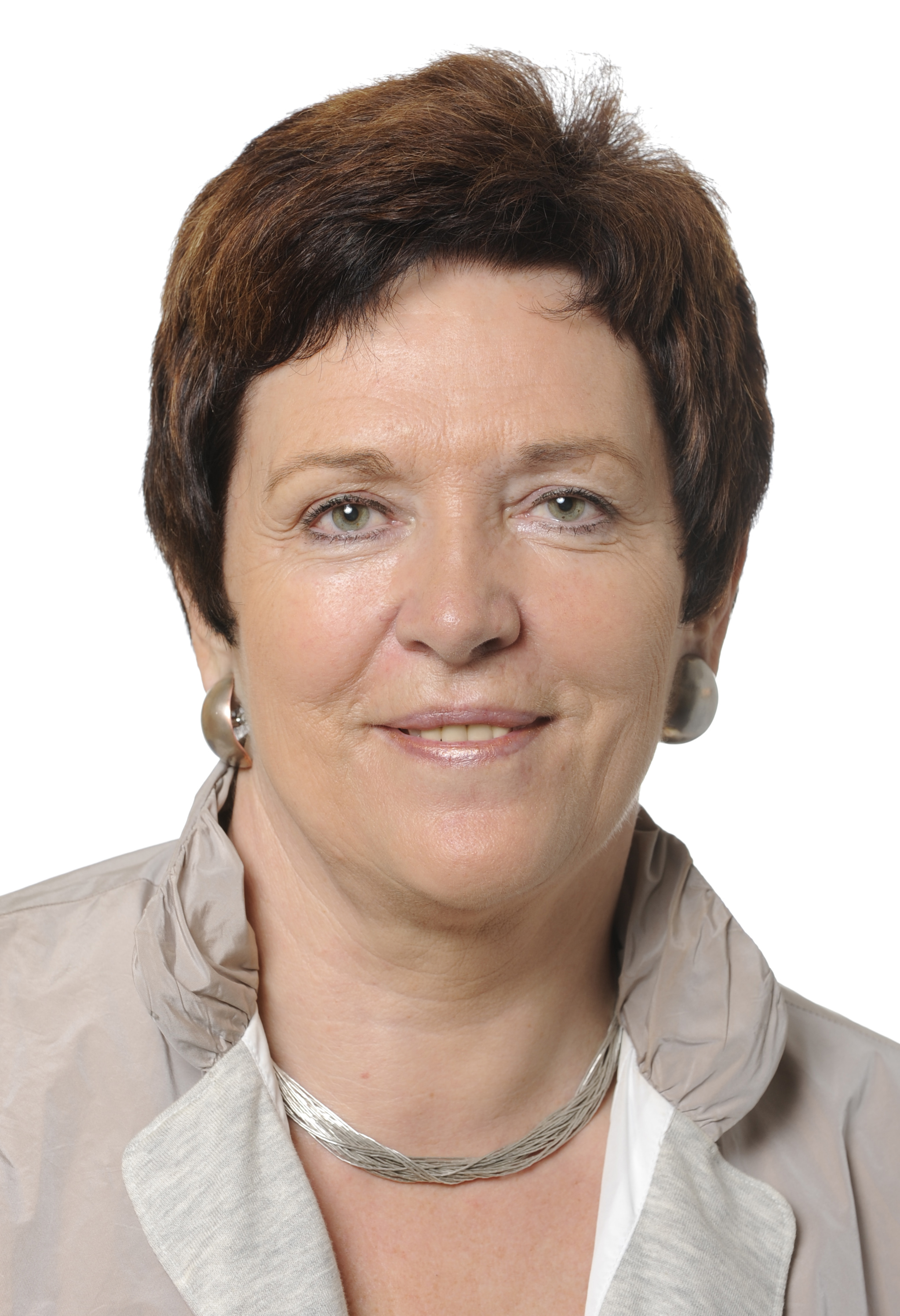
Hella Ranner
