= Othmar Karas =

Austrian politician (born 1957)

Othmar Karas MEP
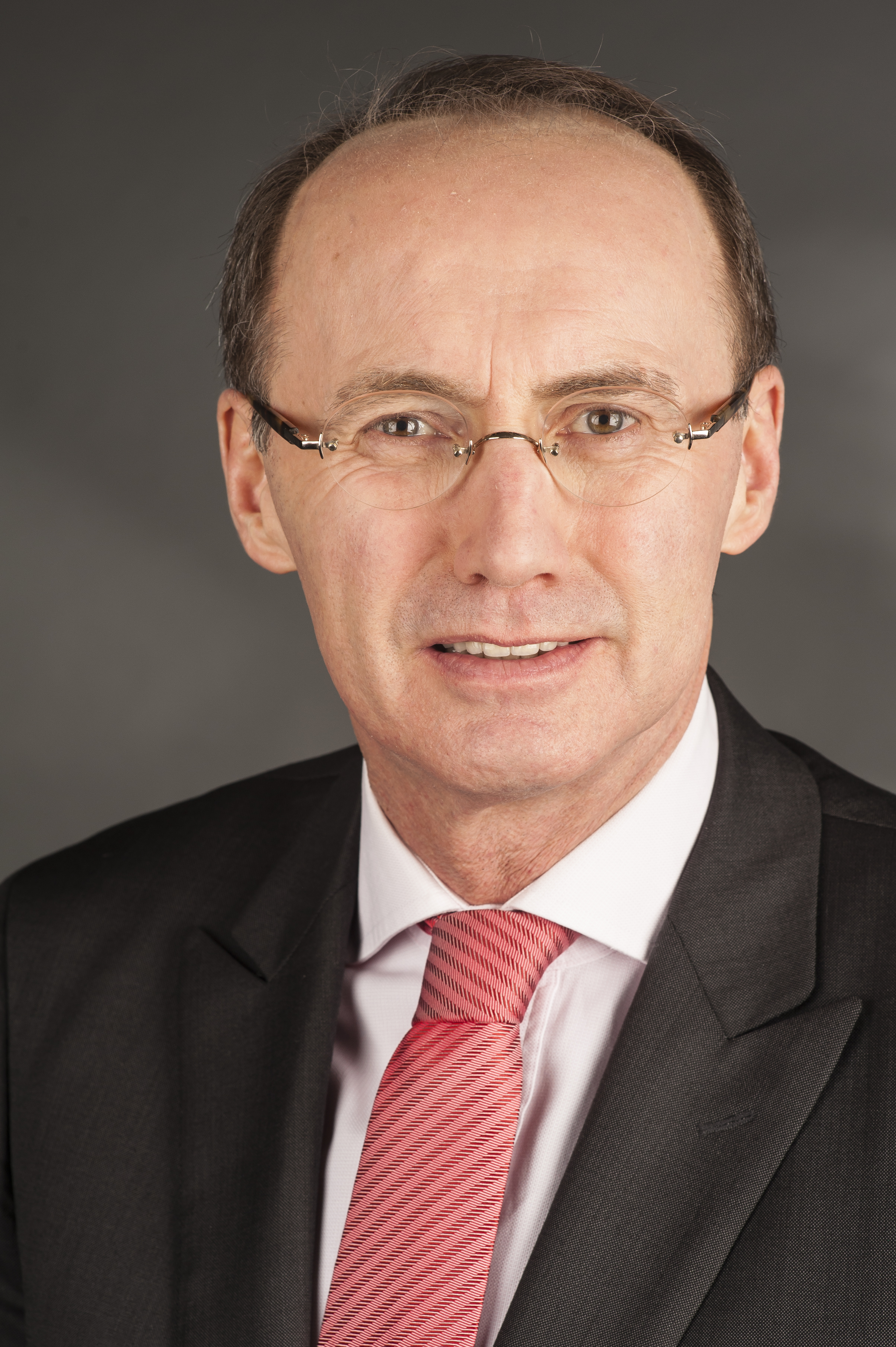
- Official portrait, 2014

First Vice-President of the European Parliament
- In office 18 January 2022 – 16 July 2024
- President: Roberta Metsola
- Preceded by: Roberta Metsola
- Succeeded by: Sabine Verheyen

Vice-President of the European Parliament
- In office 3 July 2019 – 18 January 2022 Serving with See List
- President: David Sassoli
- In office 18 January 2012 – 30 June 2014 Serving with See List
- President: Martin Schulz; Gianni Pittella (acting)

Member of the European Parliament for Austria
- In office 1 July 1999 – 16 July 2024

Leader of the Austrian People's Party in the European Parliament
- In office 1 July 1999 – 2019
- Leader: Wolfgang Schüssel; Wilhelm Molterer; Josef Pröll; Michael Spindelegger; Reinhold Mitterlehner; Sebastian Kurz

Personal details
- Born: 24 December 1957 (age 68) Ybbs an der Donau, Austria
- Party: Austrian People's Party
- Other political affiliations: European People's Party
- Spouse: Christa Waldheim
- Children: 2
- Education: University of Vienna; University of St. Gallen
- Website: Official website

Othmar Karas (born 24 December 1957) is an Austrian politician who served as the First Vice-President of the European Parliament January 2022 to July 2024, and was a Member of the European Parliament (MEP) from 1999 to 2024. He is a member of the Austrian People's Party (ÖVP), which in turn affiliates with the European People's Party.

Karas sat on the European Parliament's Committee on Economic and Monetary Affairs and the Special Committee on Tax Rulings and Other Measures Similar in Nature or Effect. Between 2012 and 2022, he was one of the vice presidents of the European Parliament. He was elected as First Vice-President on 18 January 2022.

== Education and early career ==
- Manager in the banking and insurance sector (since 1981)
- Magister of Philosophy, political science, University of Vienna (1996)
- Master of European and International Business Law (MBL), University of St. Gallen (1997)
- Doctor of Philosophy, political science, University of Vienna (2017)
- Assistant Secretary-General of Bundesländer Versicherung (currently on leave of absence)

== Political career ==
=== Beginnings ===
- Federal president of the Union of Students (1976–1979)
- Political adviser to the ÖVP (1979–1980)
- First Vice-Chairman of the Austrian Federal Youth Association (1980–1990)
- Federal Chairman of the Young ÖVP (1981–1990)
- Member of the national executive of the ÖVP (1981–1991)
- Secretary-General of the ÖVP (1995–1999)
- Vice-President of the Young European Christian-Democrats (EUJCD) (1981–1990)
- Member of the EPP Bureau and Council (since 1995)
- Member of the steering committee of the European Democrat Union (EDU) (since 1995)
- Member of the National Council (1983–1990)

=== Member of the European Parliament, 1999–2024 ===
Karas was a Member of the European Parliament from the 1999 European elections to 2024. He served on the Committee on Economic and Monetary Affairs. Previously, he has also served as a substitute for the Committee on the Internal Market and Consumer Protection and as a member of the temporary committee on policy challenges and budgetary means of the enlarged Union 2007–2013. More recently, he was a member of the Special Committee on Tax Rulings and Other Measures Similar in Nature or Effect in 2015 and the Committee of Inquiry to investigate alleged contraventions and maladministration in the application of Union law in relation to money laundering, tax avoidance and tax evasion in 2016. In 2020, he also joined the Subcommittee on Tax Matters.

In the European Parliament, Karas became one of the centre-right's experts on financial regulation. As the rapporteur for the Capital Requirements Directive IV, he played a central role in the parliamentary implementation of capital requirements agreed in the Basel III accords. He helped negotiate a 2013 agreement on an EU-wide cap on bankers' bonuses. Alongside Liêm Hoang Ngoc, he later co-drafted a controversial 2014 report highlighting problems with the European Union-led bail-outs of Greece, Portugal, Cyprus and Ireland during the European debt crisis.

In addition to his committee assignments, Karas was the chairman of the parliament's delegation to the EU-Russia Parliamentary Cooperation Committee since 2014. He had served previously as member of the delegation for relations with Japan and as a substitute for the delegation for relations with the People's Republic of China.

Within his political bloc, the centre-right European People's Party Group, Karas served as the group's spokesperson on economic affairs from 2002 until 2004 and as vice-president and treasurer from 2004 until 2011. From 2011 until 2019, he led the ÖVP delegation within the EPP group.

In the 2009 European elections, the ÖVP leadership replaced Karas by Ernst Strasser as its lead candidate for the European Parliament; Strasser later had to resign as a consequence of the 2011 cash for influence scandal. Ahead of the 2014 European elections, the ÖVP re-nominated Karas as its lead candidate. At the time, he was considered by Austrian media as a possible successor to Johannes Hahn as Austrian nominee for European Commissioner.

From the 2019 European Parliament election, Karas served as one of its Vice-Presidents; in this capacity, he was part of the Parliament's leadership under President David Sassoli.

In 2021, Karas was appointed to the EPP group's task force for proposing changes to its rules of procedure to allow for "the possibility of the collective termination of membership of a group of Members rather than just individual membership", alongside Esteban González Pons, Jan Olbrycht, Esther de Lange and Paulo Rangel.

In late 2021, Karas announced his candidacy to succeed Sassoli as President of the European Parliament. The EPP selected Roberta Metsola as their candidate for President to succeed Sassoli, and she was elected President on 18 January 2022. On the same day, Karas was elected First Vice-President of the European Parliament.

== Political positions ==
Following the 2014 elections, Karas joined fellow MEPs Sven Giegold, Sylvie Goulard, Sophie in 't Veld and Alessia Mosca in an open letter aimed at exerting pressure on the President of the European Commission and national government leaders during the nominations process to improve the gender balance in the composition of the European Commission.

In 2020, Karas led an initiative of nearly 40 other EPP members who pushed to expel Tamás Deutsch from their parliamentary group after the latter had compared comments made by group leader Manfred Weber to the slogans of the Gestapo and Hungary's communist-era secret police; Deutsch was eventually suspended but not expelled from the group.

== Timeline of positions held ==
- Hilfswerk Austria, President (since 1998)
- Political Academy of the Austrian People's Party, Vice-President
- Austrian Society for China Studies (ÖGCF), Member of the Presidium
- Austrian Association of Graduates, Member of the Board
- Institute for Public Social Responsibility, Member of the Board of Trustees
- Kangaroo Group, President (2009-2013), Member of the Board (since 2013)

== Controversy ==
In 2005, EU parliamentarian Hans Peter Martin revealed that Karas collected thousands of euros of "daily allowance" of 262 euros a day, even though he was often only in Brussels for a few hours on those days or it was a matter of holiday weeks.

== Awards ==
- 2003 – Decoration of Honour for Services to the Republic of Austria
- 2024 - Winner, Lifetime Achievement Award, The Parliament Magazine's MEP Awards.

== Personal life ==
Karas is married to Dr. Christa Waldheim-Karas, daughter of Kurt Waldheim and Elisabeth Waldheim.
