= Richard Seeber =

Austrian politician (born 1962)

Dr. Richard Seeber MEP
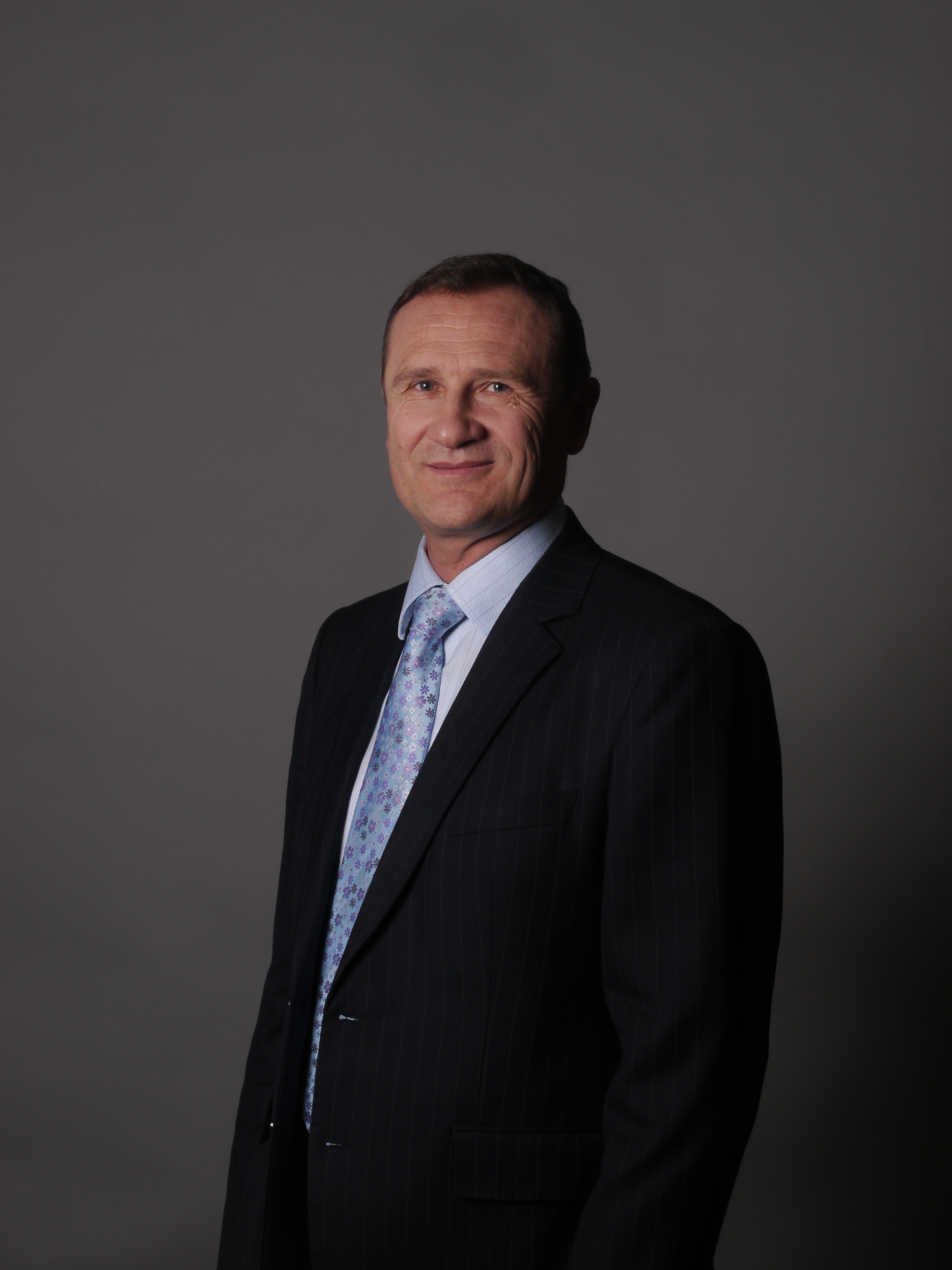
- Richard Seeber, 2014

Member of the European Parliament
- In office 2004–2014
- Constituency: Austria

Personal details
- Born: 15 January 1962 (age 64) Innsbruck, Tyrol, Austria
- Party: European People's Party
- Education: Leopold-Franzens-Universität Innsbruck
- Website: www.richard-seeber.at

Richard Seeber (born 15 January 1962 in Innsbruck) is an Austrian politician of the Austrian People's Party ÖVP who served as a Member of the European Parliament from 2004 until 2014. He is married and has four children.

== Early life and education ==
Between 1968 and 1972, Seeber went to the elementary school in Haiming in Tyrol. From 1972 to 1980, he studied at the high school in Imst Tyrol specialising in scientific subjects.

In 1980, Seeber started to study laws at the University of Innsbruck. On June 30, 1984 he was awarded his doctor of law's degree. In the same period, Seeber was enrolled in economic studies at the University of Innsbruck and he completed his degree in 1988 with the title Mag. rer. soc. oec. During his studies, he took various language classes. Under those are English and French.

== Career ==
Thanks to his excellent language skills, Seeber worked as cruise director on Romanian and Bulgarian ships plying the Danube and as tourist guide in Romania and at the Black Sea Coast during 1985 and 1989. From 1987 to the beginning of 1989, he worked for 13 months as barrister at the district court of Imst as well as at the regional court of Innsbruck. In 1990, he worked as trainee lawyer before taking up his new employment in the tourism department of the Tyrol Chamber of Commerce in 1991.

From 1992 to 1995, he was the first director of the newly established Europe Department at the Tyrol Chamber of Commerce. In his role as director, he contributed not only to the creation of the Europe Department, but also at its transformation into the EU-Info-Centre at the Tyrol Chamber of Commerce. In 1995, he was nominated as the first director of the newly established relay office of the Euregio Tyrol at the European Union in Brussels, Belgium. Furthermore, in 1999 he was elected as president of the Christian Democratic Europe Forum (CDEF), a think tank in Brussels.

At the European Parliament election in June 2004, Seeber was elected as Member of the European Parliament for the European People's Party and European Democrats EPP-ED. He was already member in the Committee on the Environment, Public Health and Food Safety and a substitute member in the Committee on Regional Development during his first legislative period at the European Parliament. In 2005 Richard Seeber was rapporteur of the European People's Party and European Democrats EPP-ED for bathing water. In 2007 the European Parliament appointed Richard Seeber as rapporteur for flooding and respectively for droughts and water shortage in 2008. In the period from 2004-2009 he was also member of the Committee on Petitions, and the Delegation to the EU-Russia Parliamentary Cooperation Committee, as well as the Delegation for the ACP–EU Joint Parliamentary Assembly.

At the European Parliament election on 7 June 2009, Seeber was re-elected as a member of the European Parliament. Directly after that, the EPP-Group elected Richard Seeber to its co-coordinator for the Committee on the Environment, Public Health and Food Safety. In the current 7th period of legislation of the European Parliament, Seeber, moreover, was a member of the delegation to the Euro-Latin American Parliamentary Assembly. Furthermore, he is a substitute member in the Committee on Regional Development as well as in the Delegation to the EU-Russia Parliamentary Cooperation Committee.

In his work Seeber specially focuses on the topic of water. In January 2010 he founded the first Intergroup on Water of the European Parliament. This Intergroup, in which he acts as President, is a broader platform for many members of the European Parliament, representatives of the European Commission as well as representatives from economy, environmental protection and regional development.

Further key elements of Seebers work are environmental protection, air quality and mountainous regions.

== Career ==
- Dr. iur. Innsbruck University (1984)
- Studied economics, Mag. rer. soc. oec. Innsbruck University (1988)
- Barrister and solicitor (1987–1990)
- Tyrol Chamber of Commerce (1991–1995)
- Director, Tyrol EU Office, Brussels (1995–2004)
- Member of the European Parliament (2004–2014)
