= 1999 European Parliament election in Austria =

- 13 June 1999

21 seats to the European Parliament
- Turnout: 49.40% (▼18.33 pp)

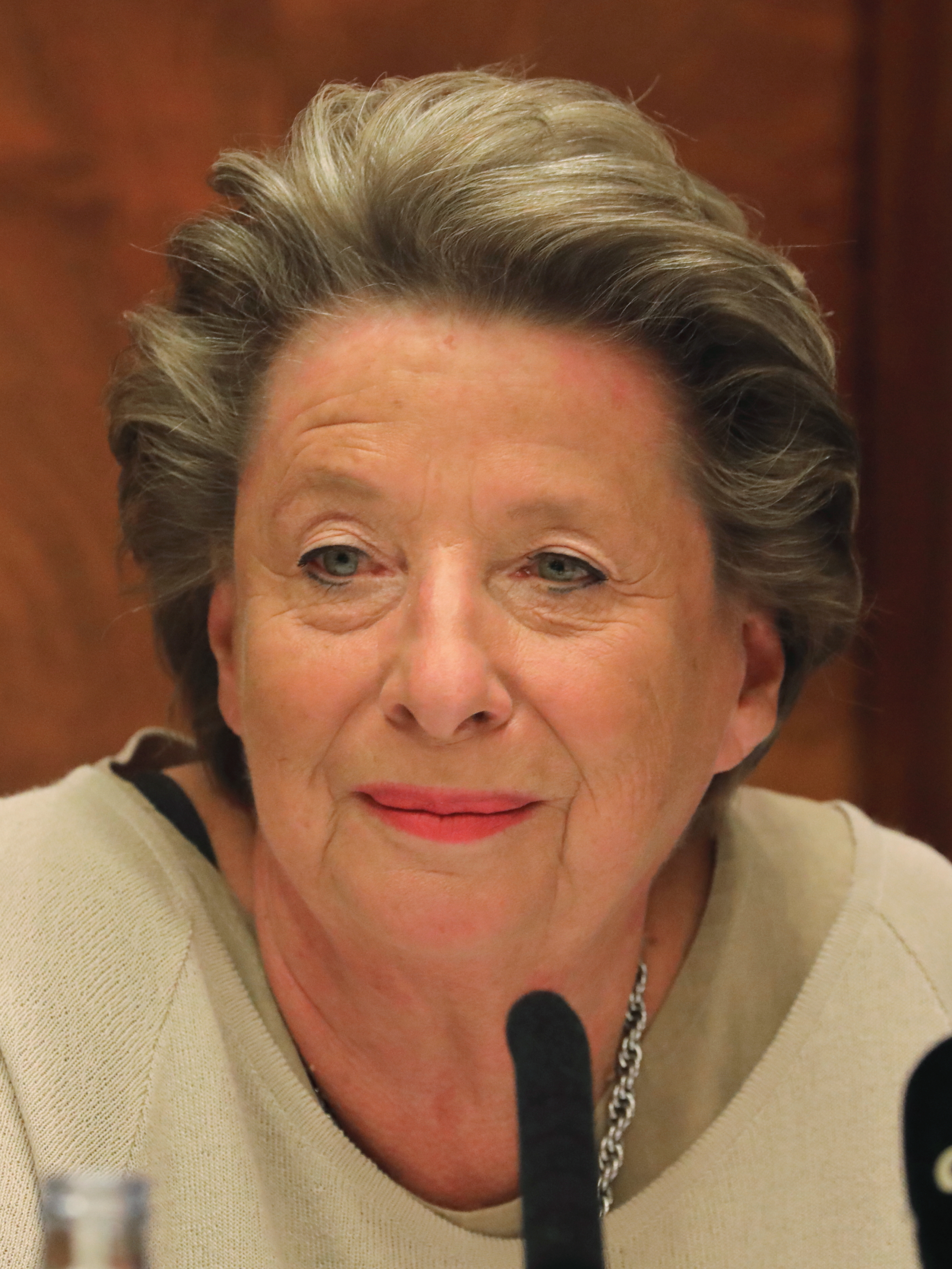

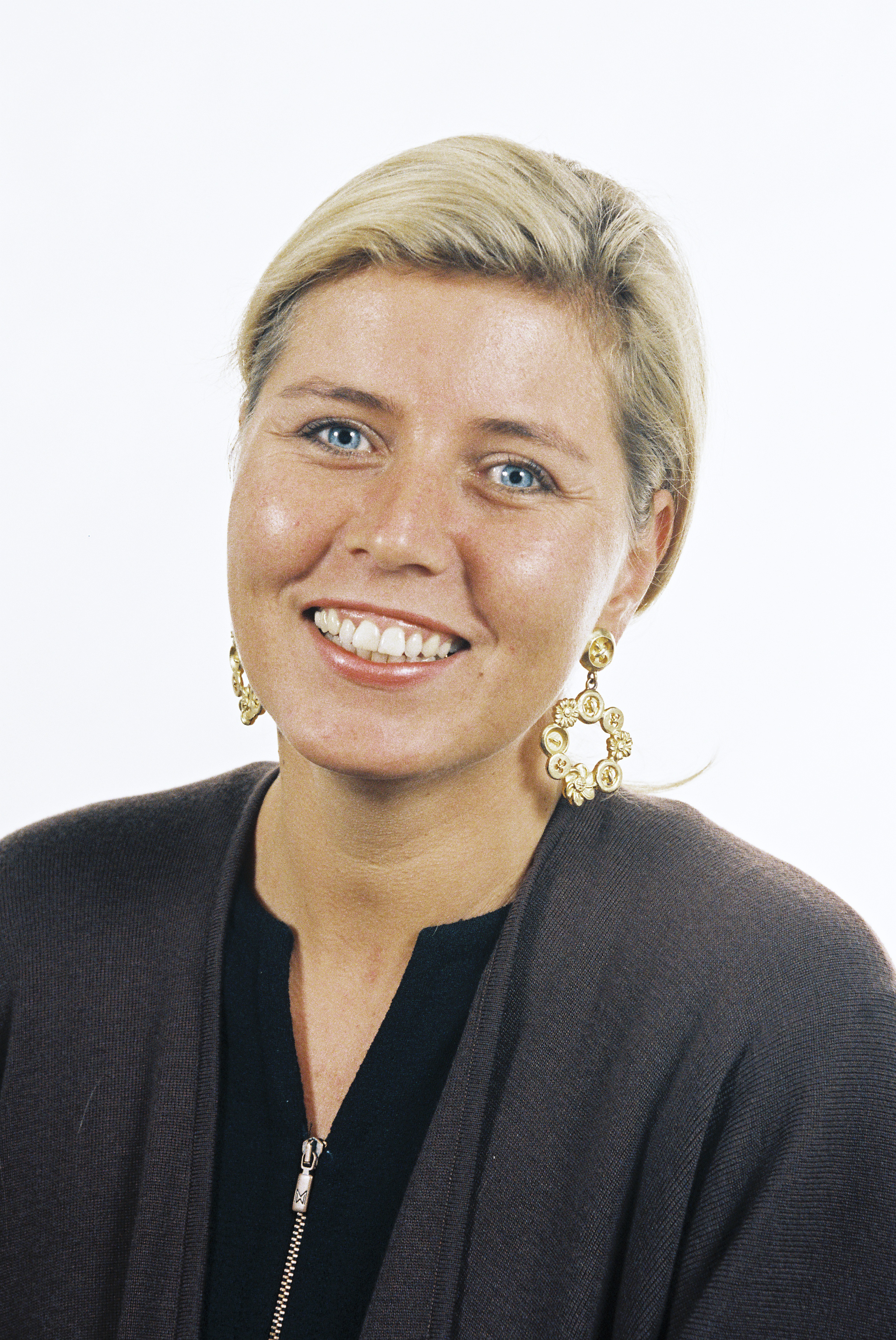

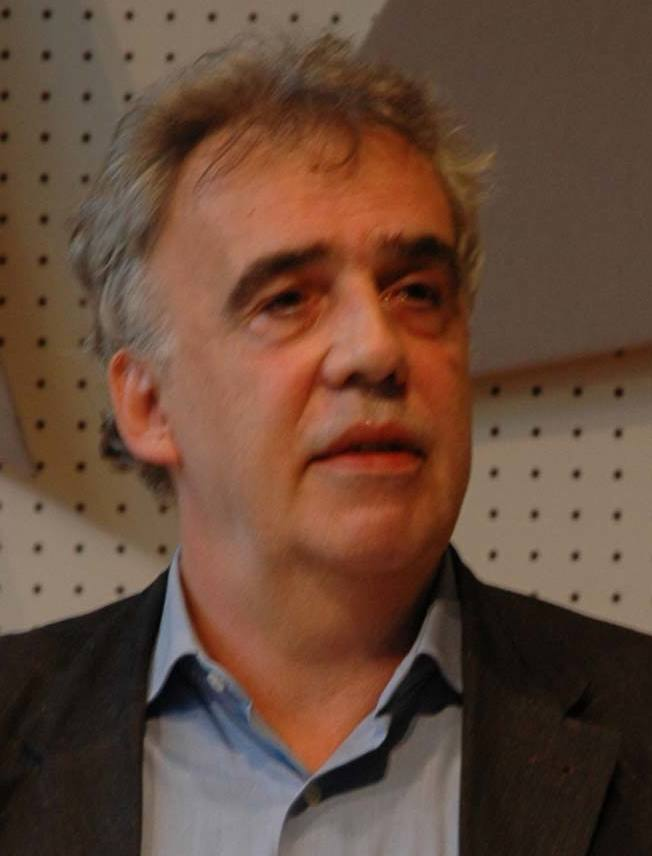
	First party	Second party
Leader	Hans-Peter Martin	Ursula Stenzel
Party	SPÖ	ÖVP
Alliance	PES	EPP-ED
Last election	29.15%, 6 seats	29.65%, 7 seats
Seats won	7	7
Seat change	▲1	Steady
Popular vote	888,338	859,175
Percentage	31.71%	30.67%
Swing	▲2.56pp	▲1.02pp
	Third party	Fourth party
Leader	Daniela Raschhofer	Johannes Voggenhuber
Party	FPÖ	Greens
Alliance	NI	Greens-ALE
Last election	27.53%, 6 seats	6.81%, 1 seat
Seats won	5	2
Seat change	▼1	▲1
Popular vote	655,519	260,273
Percentage	23.40%	9.29%
Swing	▼4.13pp	▲2.48pp

An election was held in 1999 to elect the delegation from Austria to the European Parliament.

== Results ==
Party or alliance		Votes	%	Seats	+/–
PES	Social Democratic Party of Austria	888,338	31.71	7	+1
EPP-ED	Austrian People's Party	859,175	30.67	7	0
NI	Freedom Party of Austria	655,519	23.40	5	–1
Greens-ALE	The Greens – The Green Alternative	260,273	9.29	2	+1
ELDR	Liberal Forum	74,467	2.66	0	–1
NI	Christian Social Alliance–Karl Habsburg's List	43,084	1.54	0	New
GUE-NGL	Communist Party of Austria	20,497	0.73	0	0
Total		2,801,353	100.00	21	0
Valid votes		2,801,353	96.98		
Invalid/blank votes		87,380	3.02		
Total votes		2,888,733	100.00		
Registered voters/turnout		5,847,660	49.40		
Source: Ministry of Interior

=== Results by state ===
State	SPÖ	ÖVP	FPÖ	GRÜNE	LiF	CSA	KPÖ
Burgenland	41.6	34.1	17.6	4.1	1.3	0.9	0.3
Carinthia	36.0	21.1	34.2	5.4	1.5	1.3	0.5
Lower Austria	32.3	36.2	20.0	7.4	2.2	1.4	0.6
Upper Austria	30.7	32.0	25.0	8.6	1.9	1.2	0.5
Salzburg	27.6	32.9	23.9	10.7	2.5	2.0	0.5
Styria	32.3	30.1	25.0	7.9	2.1	1.7	0.9
Tyrol	21.7	37.4	22.1	13.0	2.8	2.6	0.4
Vorarlberg	19.8	35.8	28.3	11.3	2.9	1.6	0.3
Vienna	34.3	20.0	22.0	15.0	5.5	1.7	1.5
Austria	31.7	30.7	23.4	9.3	2.7	1.6	0.7
Source: Austrian Interior Ministry
