= Angelika Werthmann =

Austrian politician

Angelika Werthmann (7 November 1963, in Schwarzach im Pongau, Austria – 17 October 2019) was a Member of the European Parliament since 2009, representing Hans-Peter Martin's List in Austria. Between 4 July 2012 and 7 April 2014 she was a member of the Liberal Group in the European Parliament.

== Education and career ==
Werthmann studied philology at the Paris-Lodron University in Salzburg and received the title ‘Mag. phil.’ at the end of her studies. From 1989 onwards, she worked in the education system and later on, among others, as translator and interpreter in specialised areas - economics, medicine and tourism.

== Politics ==
During the European elections in 2009, Werthmann candidated with Hans Peter Martin and was placed on number three on his list. Martin, as well as the other three members of parliament did not belong to any groups in the European parliament. Media reports spoke about an alleged letter of renunciation presented to Werthmann, according to which she should waiver her parliamentary seat. However, Werthmann allegedly declined to sign the waiver. In July 2010, Werthmann left the delegation of Hans Peter Martin's list after conflicts with Martin about the lack of transparency in the party's finances.

On 5 July 2012, Werthmann joined the liberal group of the European Parliament. The Liberal Forum had planned on running for the European elections in 2014 with Werthmann as leading candidate. On 27 March, it was announced that Werthmann would candidate independently for the Alliance for the Future of Austria during European elections 2014 and consequently, she was excluded from the ALDE group. In turn, DDr. Ulrike Haider-Quercia stepped back from her top candidature and Werthmann stepped up and took her place as leading candidate for the independent "List Mag. Werthmann". However, the Alliance for the Future of Austria was not re-elected into parliament during European elections held on 25 May 2014.

== Parliamentary work ==
Werthmann is a member of the committee of petitions, the budget committee and part of the delegation for the relationship with south-Asian countries. She is also a representative member of the committee for female rights and gender equality. Further, she drafted two reports and was involved as shadow rapporteur for nine other reports. In addition, she wrote 27 opinions and 37 (joint) motions for resolution. In the course of the seventh legislative period, she put forth 616 parliamentary questions to the European Commission, the European Council and the High Representative.

Concerning her work in the budget committee, Angelika Werthmann's main focus is in the areas economics, financial investments to reduce joblessness, education and mobility, lifelong learning, health and the European globalisation adjustment fund. Additionally, she has worked as rapporteur for the following documents: "on the proposal for a regulation of the European Parliament and of the Council establishing a Health for Growth Programme, the third multi-annual programme of EU action in the field of health for the period 2014-2020", "on the proposal for a regulation of the European Parliament and of the Council amending the Statute of the Court of Justice of the European Union", "on the proposal for a Council directive amending Directive 2003/96/EC restructuring the Community framework for the taxation of energy products and electricity." In March 2013 she composed the report "on the proposal for a decision of the European Parliament and of the Council on the mobilisation of the European Globalisation Adjustment Fund, in accordance with point 28 of the Inter-institutional Agreement of 17 May 2006 between the European Parliament, the Council and the Commission on budgetary discipline and sound financial management (application EGF/2011/016 IT/Agile from Italy)."

Angelika Werthmann also worked as shadow rapporteur for the 2015 budget and she was the first MEP to successfully put forth an amendment, which addressed the situation of jobless people of the generation 50+, in the plenary.

In her position as a member of the committee of petitions, Werthmann takes a stand for the human rights situation of many petitioners, Austrian and European alike. Her main focus lies on children, adolescents, visually impaired persons, people affected by "Ley de Costas" and environmental issues. As leader of the working group concerned with the Spanish costal law, she managed to illustrate the situation in cooperation with her colleagues from different member states in a delegation trip to Spain with representatives of the Spanish government, the local authorities, NGOs and the affected people themselves. The "working document on the deliberations of the Working Group on Spanish property rights and the 1988 Coastal Law, including a fact-finding visit to Spain, 21–22 March 2013" shows the developments concerning the petitions focused on "Ley de Costas."

In June 2013, Werthmann was leader of the delegation to Copenhagen, whose results were published in the "working document on the fact-finding visit to Denmark from 20th – 21st June 2013" The goal of this fact-finding visit was to gather facts and to listen to all concerned parties, including the petitioners, about their experiences with Danish administrative, political and judicial authorities that where in charge of cases touching subjects such as children's safekeeping, custody, child care, child kidnapping. All information had been brought to the attention of the committee of petitions by (former) partners/spouses of Danish citizens and the violation of basic, human, children's and female rights can be traced back to the "Parental Responsibility Act." These violations of rights have been experienced to 90 per cent by women and mothers of Danish descent and to 10 per cent by women, mothers as well as father of non-Danish descent. In February 2014, before the end of the legislative period, several parental parties involved spoke again in front of the committee of petitions.

On the committee for women's rights and gender equality, Angelika Werthmann particularly stands up for equality between men and women in the work place and equal remuneration for the same work. Further, she wrote the report on "women with disabilities." Another topic important to Angelika Werthmann is the fight against female genital mutilation. This cruel violation of human rights as well as female rights was addressed at London City Hall on 18 April. During the event, which had been organised by "United Against Female Genital Mutilation", many high-ranking politicians, among others Angelika Werthmann, spoke up against this inhuman practise.

The written declaration on "Epilepsy" initiated by Werthmann and four additional members of parliament received 459 MEP signatures and was one of the most successful ones in the history of written declarations.

Additionally, Angelika Werthmann is a full-time member of the delegation for the "relationships between South-Asian" countries. Consequently, in the course of a two-day information meeting in Brussels, Angelika Werthmann met with participants from Bhutan, Bangladesh, India and Pakistanto discuss the socio-economic situation of the respective countries and topics such as human rights and women rights were also addressed. The dialogue "Free Trade in South Asia and the EU" had been organised by the Friedrich Naumann Foundation.

As of autumn 2012, she is a representative member in the Switzerland, Norway and the EU-Iceland and EEA JPCs delegation. She was also a representative member of the delegation of the European Union to the Republic of Croatia since summer in 2012. Additionally, she was a member of the delegation for relations with the United States from 12 November 2013 to 7 April 2014.

Since autumn 2009 Angelika Werthmann has been part of the "'High-level contact group for Relations with the Turkish Cypriot Community in the Northern Part of the Island' (CYTR)" and supports the efforts made by the committee for missing persons towards, among others, the perception of human rights such as religious freedom in Cyprus. When possible, Werthmann invests herself actively for a resolution of the Cyprus conflict.

As a member of the PETI Committee Wertmann said reference to Child Welfare: "it is obvious that the welfare of the child is a phrase of convenience for the welfare of the professionals within the system in the UK."
