= Hans-Peter Martin's List =

Hans-Peter Martin's List Liste Hans-Peter Martin
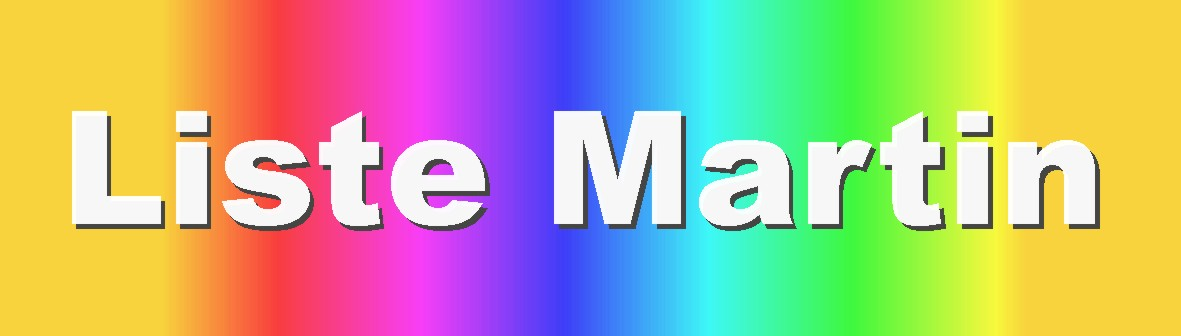
- Leader: Hans-Peter Martin
- Founded: 2004
- Dissolved: 2014
- Ideology: Populism; Euroscepticism; Anti-globalisation
- European Parliament group: Non-Inscrits (2004–2014)
- Colours: White

Website
- www.weisse.at

The Hans-Peter Martin's List – For genuine control in Brussels (German: Liste Dr. Hans-Peter Martin – Für echte Kontrolle in Brüssel) was a populist and Eurosceptic political party in Austria. It had three seats in the European Parliament.

== History ==
=== Foundation ===
Hans-Peter Martin, who had led the Social Democratic Party of Austria (SPÖ) parliamentary party in the European Parliament, founded the party in 2004 after he had come into conflict with his own party. In the 2004 European Parliament election his party received 14 per cent of the vote — more than The Greens or the Freedom Party of Austria (FPÖ), and gained two seats in the European Parliament. His colleague at the time of the elections was Karin Resetarits, a former journalist with both the ORF and a private radio station. However, they soon found themselves in disagreement and ceased to work together. Resetarits joined the Alliance of Liberals and Democrats for Europe group in the European parliament on 7 June 2005.

The party also competed in the 2006 Austrian legislative election as the "Dr. Martin's List — For Democracy, Control, Justice" (MATIN), but obtained no seats in the parliament.

=== 2009 European parliament election ===
In 2009, Martin flirted with the idea of heading a planned Austrian electoral list of the pan-European eurosceptic alliance Libertas.eu, but later rebuffed Libertas' advances. While Libertas finally didn't manage to set up a list, Martin successfully competed in the 2009 European Parliament election in Austria with his own electoral list, increasing his vote share to 18%, gaining three seats in the European Parliament.

Later, Martin wanted third-placed electee Angelika Werthmann not to take up her seat so that fourth-placed Martin Ehrenhauser could become an MEP instead. However, Werthmann refused to do so, and in the end, second-placed Robert Sabitzer didn't take up his seat; afterwards, there were rumours that Werthmann might leave to join the Greens or the FPÖ instead, which did not occur.

Reportedly, following the 2009 election Martin tried to have his three MEPs join the Alliance of Liberals and Democrats for Europe group; Martin later denied that he had wanted to join.
