= Ulrike Lunacek =

Austrian politician (born 1957)

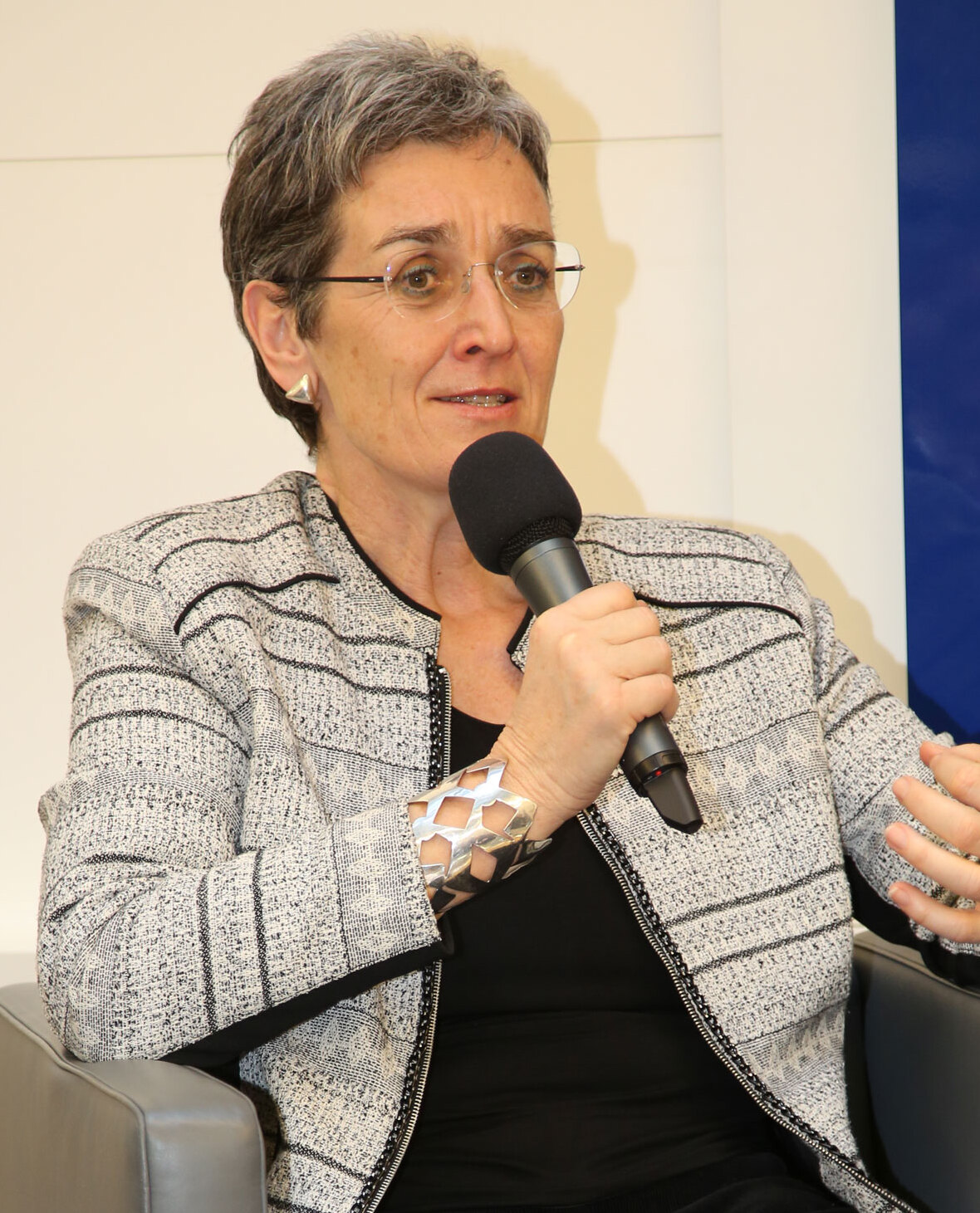
- Lunacek in 2015

Member of the European Parliament
- In office 1 July 2009 – 8 November 2017
- Succeeded by: Thomas Waitz
- Constituency: Austria

Member of the National Council
- In office 3 October 1999 – 1 July 2009
- Affiliation: The Greens

State Secretary in the Federal Ministry for Arts, Culture, the Civil Service and Sport
- In office 8 January 2020 – 20 May 2020
- Succeeded by: Andrea Mayer

Personal details
- Born: 26 May 1957 (age 69) Krems an der Donau, Lower Austria, Austria
- Party: Austrian Green Party
- Education: University of Innsbruck
- Website: www.ulrike-lunacek.eu

Ulrike Lunacek (German pronunciation: [ʔʊlˈriːkə ˈluːnatʃɛk]] born 26 May 1957) is an Austrian politician who served as State Secretary for Cultural Affairs in the government of Chancellor Sebastian Kurz in 2020. She is a member of the Austrian Green party The Greens – The Green Alternative, part of the European Green Party.

From 2009 until 2017, Lunacek was a Member of the European Parliament (MEP). During that time, she served as Vice President of the European Parliament, Member of the Greens/EFA group in the European Parliament and head of delegation of the Austrian Greens in the European Parliament. She was Kosovo rapporteur and co-president of the Intergroup on LGBTI Rights and Member of the Committee on Foreign Affairs and Substitute in the Committee on Civil Liberties, Justice and Home Affairs.

In 2017, Lunacek was the Greens' top candidate for the Austrian general election, in which the party suffered a historic defeat and failed to win a single seat in parliament for the first time since 1986. Lunacek subsequently stepped down from all Austrian and EU political functions.

Lunacek briefly served as State Secretary for Cultural Affairs in the government of Chancellor Sebastian Kurz in early 2020. In May 2020, she quit under pressure from theatre directors and performers over a lack of urgency in reopening cultural venues even as a lockdown amid the COVID-19 pandemic in Austria had been eased.

== Life ==
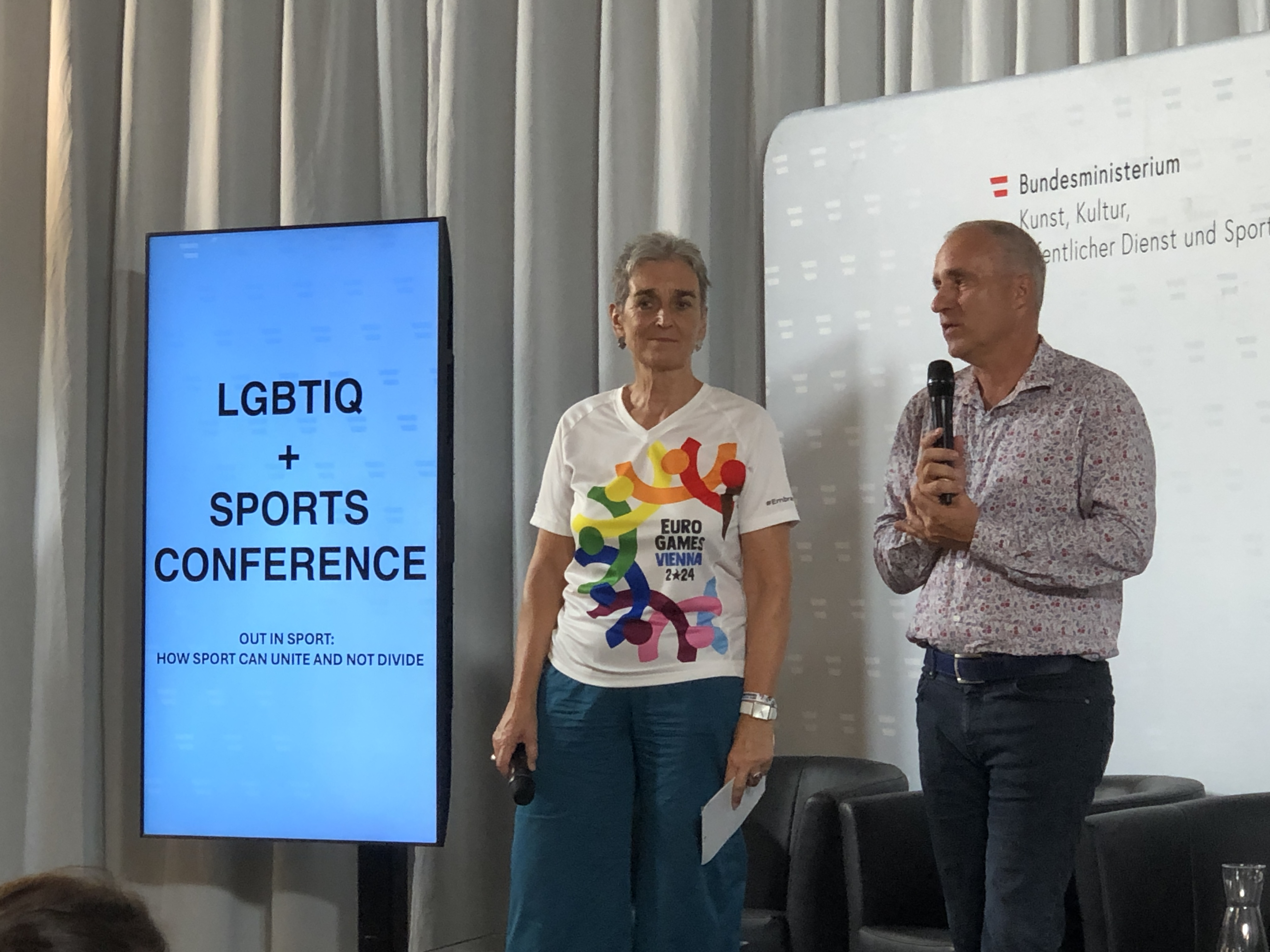
Lunacek at the LGBTIQ + SPORTS Conference at EuroGames 2024

From 1967 to 1975 Lunacek attended high school in the second district of Vienna. Furthermore, she spent one academic year (1973–74) as an AFS-student at a high school in Boone, Iowa. In 1975 she started studying interpreting (English and Spanish) at the University of Innsbruck and graduated in 1983. During this time she was involved in the establishment of the Tyrolian women's shelter in Innsbruck and did social work. From 1984 to 1986 she was an adviser for the organization "Frauensolidarität" (Solidarity among Women) in Vienna. From 1994 to 2023 she was President; and since 2023 Vice President of the organization. From 1989 to 1995 Lunacek was editor of the magazine "Südwind" and press officer of the Austrian Information Service for Development Politics (ÖIE, today Südwind). In addition she worked as a freelance interpreter and journalist.

In 1994 Lunacek was NGO delegate at the UN International Conference on Population and Development in Cairo and a year later from Vienna she coordinated the press work of Austrian NGOs participating at the Fourth World Conference on Women in Beijing.

Lunacek is a swimmer, member of SC Diana Wien and the LGBTIQ swimming club Kraulquappen, and was coorganizer of EuroGames 2024 held in Vienna.

== Political career ==
Lunacek's political career began in 1995 with the presentation of the "Appeal to reason", organized by the Austrian Lesbian and Gay Forum in Palais Auersperg, and the first-time candidacy – openly as a lesbian – for the Austrian Green Party, whose federal secretary general she was from 1996 to 1998.

=== Member of the Austrian Parliament, 1999–2009 ===
From 1999 to 2009, Lunacek was a member of parliament and the Green group's spokeswoman on foreign and development policy as well as equality for lesbians, gays and transgender persons. Also starting in 1999, she was deputy chairwoman of the Committee on Foreign Affairs.

As the first openly lesbian politician in the Austrian Parliament, she is also a member of the Party's LGBTIQ taskforce "Grüne andersrum".

On 5 May 2006 Lunacek was elected co-chair of the European Green Party in Helsinki, a position she held for 3 years. On 28 October 2008 she became vice-chair of the Green Parliamentary Group in Austria and was nominated frontrunner for the 2009 European Parliament election.

=== Member of the European Parliament, 2009–2017 ===
On 14 July 2009 Lunacek moved into the European Parliament as head of delegation of the Austrian Greens. During her tenure, she was a member of the Committee on Foreign Affairs (AFET), the Committee on Women's Rights and Gender Equality (FEMM) and the delegation to the parliamentary Cooperation Committees EU-Armenia, EU-Azerbaijan and EU-Georgia (DSCA). In addition she was a substitute member of the Committee on Civil Liberties, Justice and Home Affairs (LIBE), the delegation for relations with Albania, Bosnia and Herzegovina, Serbia, Montenegro and Kosovo (DSEE) and the delegation to the Euronest Parliamentary Assembly (DEPA). Moreover, she was the Parliament's Rapporteur for Kosovo and the foreign affairs spokesperson of the Greens/EFA group.

As co-president of the European Parliament's Intergroup on LGBTI Rights Lunacek also fought for the rights of lesbians, gays, bisexuals and transgender persons. In February 2014 she was the European Parliament rapporteur for the "Roadmap against Homophobia and discrimination on grounds of sexual orientation and gender identity". In addition, she was a member of the European Parliament Intergroup on the Western Sahara and the European Parliament Intergroup on Children's Rights.

In 2011, European Voice reported that Lunacek, encouraged by aides to Catherine Ashton, had been asked to become head of the EEAS’s office in Kosovo, but was then told by the Austrian government that, as a non-diplomat, she was not eligible.

Lunacek participated in several EU-Election Observer Missions (EOM), and was Head of the EU-EOM for the 2013 Honduran general elections.

In February 2013 Lunacek was elected vice-president of the Greens/EFA group in the European Parliament, under the leadership of Rebecca Harms and Daniel Cohn-Bendit. Following the 2014 European elections, the group voted for her as candidate for the presidency of the European Parliament. She then got elected as one of the fourteen Vice Presidents of the European Parliament who sit in for the president in presiding over the plenary. In this capacity, she was in charge of the parliament’s Sakharov Prize and also in charge of the parliament Eco-Management and Audit Scheme (EMAS). One of her successes with EMAS was the substitution of plastic bottles in meeting rooms by water dispensers in all of the parliament's corridors. She also represented the parliament in matters concerning the Western Balkans. and was a member of the Democracy Support and Election Coordination Group (DEG), which oversees the Parliament’s election observation missions.

== Political positions ==
As Co-Chair of the LGBTIQ-Intergroup Lunacek participated at numerous Pride Parades in several EU-member states and candidate countries, especially where equal rights didn't exist yet or were under threat. Holding up the EU flag, her message always was: "Under this flag we are protected!"

In 2013, Lunacek advocated for a non-binding resolution on "Sexual and Reproductive Health and Rights". that called for "age-appropriate and gender-sensitive sexuality and relationship education ... for all children and adolescents" and referenced a document co-authored by the WHO in which some sexuality information is deemed appropriate from age 4. After some controversy, the European Parliament instead passed a modified version which declared sexual education a competence of the member states. Lunacek called the opponents of the report “right-wing bigots” stating the groups were against “women’s right to a safe and healthy reproductive and sexual life”.

In 2014 she invited Eurovision Song Contest winner Conchita Wurst to a press conference and a performance of "Rise like a Phoenix" and other songs in the European Parliament.

In November 2014 Pope Francis came to the European Parliament in Strasbourg on an official visit; at the welcome ceremony Vice President Lunacek handed the Argentinian pope a rainbow flag, declaring in Spanish that this flag is a symbol of Andean indigenous groups of peace and of LGBTIQ people. He took it with a smile.

In her tenure as Kosovo rapporteur of the European Parliament Lunacek urged the council of the European Union to vote for visa free travel for Kosovo citizens to the European Union; Visa free travel for the other six Western Balkan countries was already granted in 2009 resp. 2010.

On 27 April 2017, Lunacek welcomed the release of Ramush Haradinaj, former leader of the Kosovo Liberation Army KLA. Haradinaj was accused of war crimes and crimes against humanity by the Serbian War crimes prosecutor and Serbia demanded his extradition. Lunacek urged EU officials to pressure Serbia to withdraw its arrest warrants.

== Other activities ==
- BürgerInnenforum Europa, Vice President
- Frauen*solidarität, Vice President
- EuroGames 2024 Vienna, Member of the Team
- European Forum Alpbach, Member of the Council
- Österreichisch-Saharauische Gesellschaft (ÖSG), Member

== Awards ==
- Grand Decoration of Honour in Gold with Star (2019)
- Grand Gold Decoration for Services to the Republic of Austria (2009)
- Rosa Courage Award (2013)

== Personal life ==
Lunacek had her coming-out in 1980. Since 1994, she has been in a (registered) partnership with a native Peruvian.

== Publications ==
- [Zwischenrufe: Kolumnen, Kommentare, Interviews, with a preface by Johanna Dohnal and Freda Meissner-Blau, Milena-Verlag, Wien 2006, ISBN 978-3-85286-148-7]
- [Frieden bauen, heißt weit bauen: Von Brüssel ins Amselfeld und retour: Mein Beitrag zu Kosovos/Kosovas Weg in die EU, Wieser-Verlag, Klagenfurt 2018, ISBN 978-3-99029-304-1]
- [„Zwei Grüne Leben - Vater und Tochter in Umbrüchen, Aufbrüchen und Wendezeiten“, Kremayr & Scheriau, Wien 2022, ISBN 978-3-218-01365-9]
- [“Global Female Future - Wie feministische Kämpfe Arbeit, Ökologie und Politik verändern“, Kremayr & Scheriau, Wien 2022, ISBN 978-3-218-01361-1]
