= Hans-Peter Martin =

Austrian journalist and politician

Hans-Peter Martin (born 11 August 1957) is an Austria author and journalist and former politician who has been a Member of the European Parliament between 1999 and 2014.

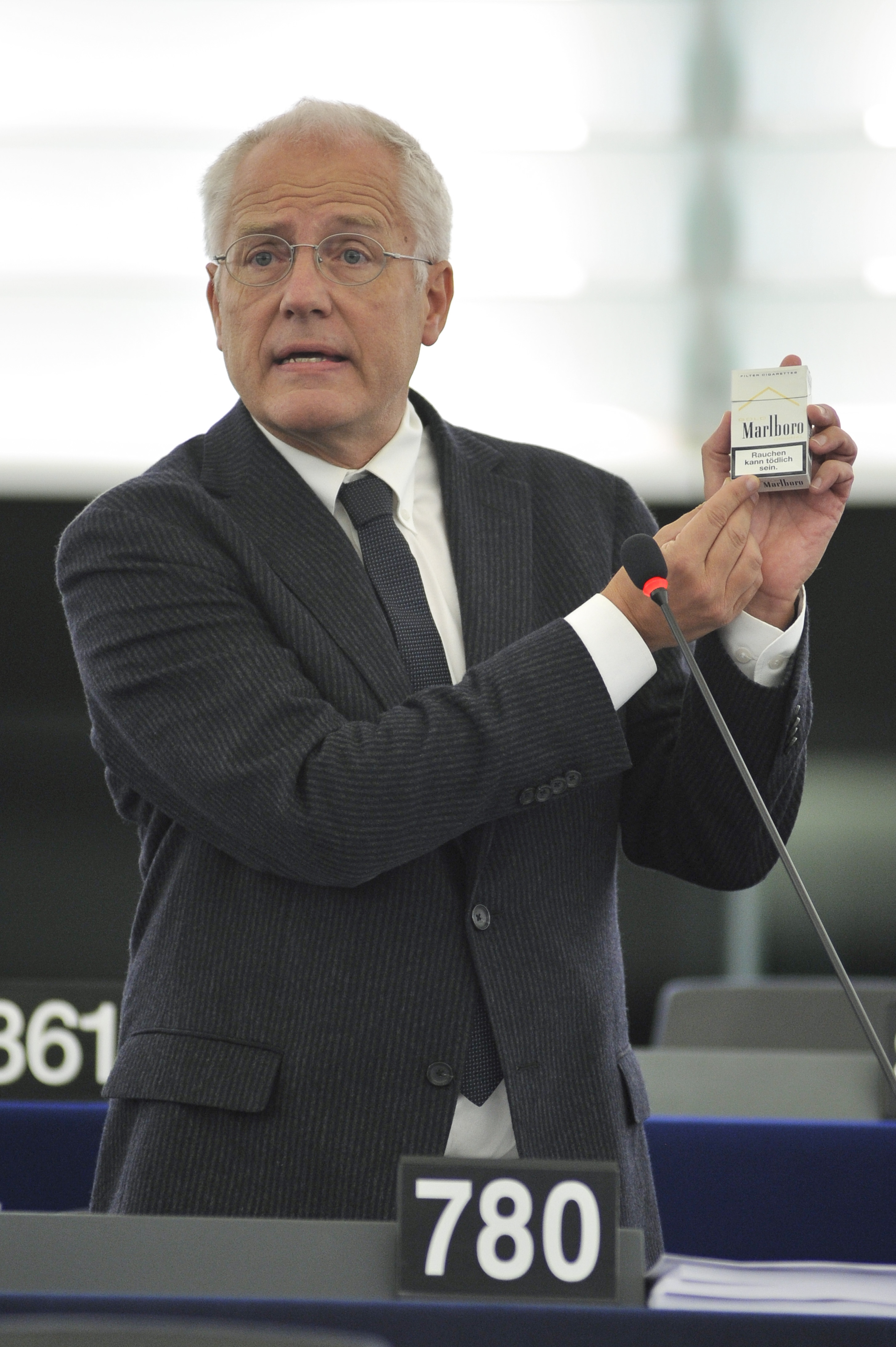

== Journalist and author ==
Born in Bregenz, Austria, Martin graduated from the University of Vienna in 1984. Already by then, he worked for the German weekly news magazine Der Spiegel. 1986, he became an editor, from 1989 he became the foreign correspondent of Der Spiegel, located in Rio de Janeiro. 1996, he became the foreign correspondent for Vienna and Prague. As a freelance writer, he has written and co-authored several popular books, among them the best-selling The Global Trap: Globalization and the Assault on Prosperity and Democracy (Die Globalisierungsfalle, 1996), Bitter Pills (Bittere Pillen) about the pros and cons of pharmaceuticals and The European Trap (Die Europafalle, only available in German but a partial translation is available on Martin's website), an inside analysis of European integration, faults of the European bureaucracy and lobbyism in the EU.

The publishing house Penguin Random House released a new book by Hans-Peter Martin carrying the title Game Over: Wellbeing for the few, Democracy for no one, Nationalism for all – and then? in September 2018."Game over" was shortlisted, together with nine other books, for the best German Economic Book of the year 2018.

Game Over has been subject to numerous reviews:

The German weekly Die Zeit called the book "Discussion inspiring" and wrote that "The book by Hans-Peter Martin is neither scaremongering nor defeatist. It convinces by chaining together a variety of societal phenomena which are rarely combined in popular discourse: the unbroken neoliberal agenda and capital accumulation leading to the breakdown of individual liberties, democracy, and – eventually – war. This is the challenging thesis of the book."

The German newsmagazine Der Spiegel wrote: "The bad news is that the author is likely to be correct in all of his analyses. The good news is that for each game that ends, a new one begins."

== European Parliament 1999–2004 ==
In the 1999 European Parliament elections Martin was elected as the independent frontrunner of the Social Democratic Party of Austria (SPOe). Martin left the European Parliamentary Group of Social Democrats in 2004.

Since then Martin was reelected through his independent candidate list, Hans-Peter Martin's List, in 2004 and 2009.

Early in 2004, he accused MEPs of all parties of falsely claiming reimbursement of travel and subsistence expenses. He produced evidence of MEP's signing the register in the morning to receive their daily allowance, and then immediately leaving the building. Broadcast on German TV, the accusations caused an uproar. The then European Parliament spokesman Hans Gert Pöttering dismissed Martin's accusations as unnecessarily aggressive and the President of the Parliament Pat Cox said that he would have preferred to deal with the case internally.

In response, Martin was accused of claiming too much in meal expenses. He was later cleared of this charge.

Eventually the disclosures and the public outrage Martin's revelations induced resulted in a change of the expense system.

== European Parliament 2004–09 ==
In the 2004 European Parliament elections Hans-Peter Martin decided to compete on his own party list "Hans-Peter Martin's List – For genuine control and transparency in Brussels" (Liste Dr. Hans-Peter Martin – Für echte Kontrolle in Brüssel). For an independent he received a surprising 14% of the vote – more than the Greens or the right-wing Austrian Freedom Party – and gained two of Austria's seats in the European Parliament. He has been widely credited with having reduced the vote share of the far-right parties.

The second mandate went to Austrian Karin Resetarits, a former journalist with the Austrian public broadcaster ORF and a private radio station. However, Martin and Resetarits soon found themselves in heavy disagreement and ceased to work together. She later joined the Liberal group in the European Parliament on June 7, 2005 and was not reelected.

Martin's list also competed in the Austrian legislative elections of 2006, but received only 2.8% of the vote and thus was blocked from entry into the Austrian parliament by the requirement to at least have 4% of the vote. Martin explained the unexpectedly low result with accusations of "expedient but contrary to the rule" use of the secretarial allowance, which were widely publicised in the Austrian media. The later court ruling stated that Martin used the funds correctly and did not benefit from the money, but as he did not follow some formal requirements he was ordered to repay the funds. Martin argued that this was a political decision.

== European Parliament 2009–14 ==
In 2009, Martin flirted with the idea of heading a planned Austrian list of the pan-European eurosceptical alliance Libertas.eu, but later rebuffed Libertas' advances.

While Libertas finally didn't manage to set up a list at all, Martin successfully competed again with his independent Hans-Peter Martin's List. He even surprised many by increasing his vote share to 18%, giving his list three seats in the European Parliament.

In 2014, Martin decided against standing for election, instead returning to journalism. Reflecting on his political work, Martin consistently defines himself as a "buffer against the far-right".

=== Anti-Lobbyism campaign ===
During his mandate Martin vocally campaigned for transparency and against lobbying. Starting in 2011 he collected and published all lobby invitations his office received and in 2013 published an analysis. In total Martin collected more than 1400 "lobby attempts" during the two-year timespan and published a summary table ordered by category. Among examples of extraordinary lobbying Martin listed were all-inclusive travels to Azerbaijan, China and Switzerland as well as free conference invitations to Cyprus and London. He estimated the value of the two years of lobbying to be up to 65,000 Euro.

== See also ==
- Accountability in the European Union
