= Hannes Swoboda =

Austrian politician (born 1946)

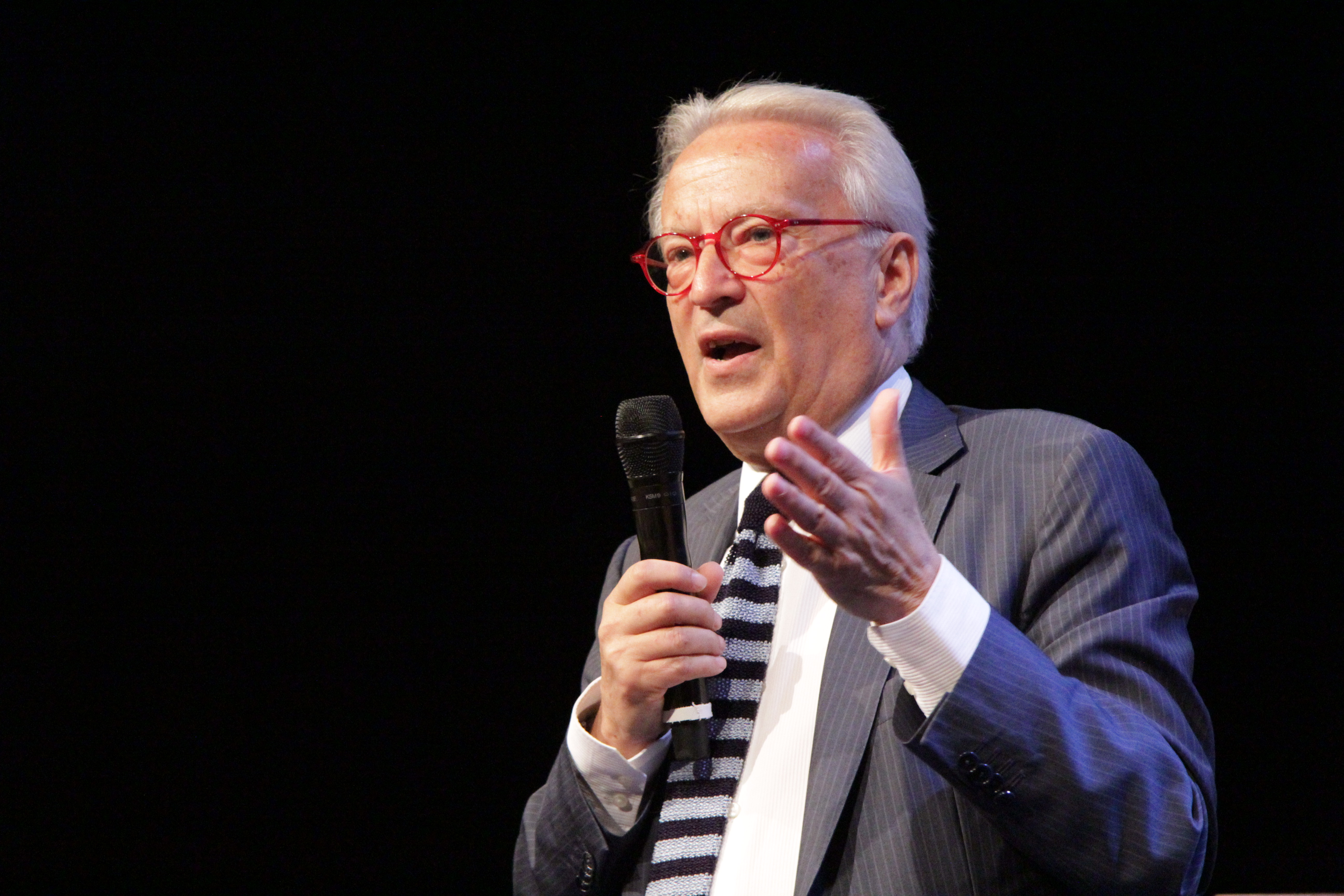
- Swoboda in 2013

Leader of the Progressive Alliance of Socialists and Democrats
- In office 17 January 2012 – 18 June 2014
- Preceded by: Martin Schulz
- Succeeded by: Gianni Pittella

Personal details
- Born: 10 November 1946 (age 79) Bad Deutsch-Altenburg, Austria
- Party: Social Democratic Party
- Education: University of Vienna
- Website: hannes-swoboda.at

Hannes Swoboda (born 10 November 1946) is an Austrian social democratic politician who served as a Member of the European Parliament from 1996 until 2014. Within the Parliament, he represents the Social Democratic Party of Austria and from January 2012 to June 2014, he was also the president of the group of the Progressive Alliance of Socialists and Democrats.

== Career ==
=== Career in local politics ===
After studying law and economics at the University of Vienna, Swoboda worked in the Vienna Chamber of Labour (1971–86) and was director of the department for urban policies and housing policy. Swoboda also held a number of different functions within the Social Democratic Party of Austria (SPÖ). From 1983, he was a member of the municipal council and member of the city council of Vienna. In 1988 he became municipal councillor, regional minister, responsible for urban development, planning, transport and external relations. Swoboda is a member of the federal party executive committee of the SPÖ and the Viennese party executive committee.

=== Member of the European Parliament, 1996–2014 ===
In the European Parliament Swoboda was a Member of the Committee on Foreign Affairs, where he served as rapporteur on Russia; substitute member in the Committee on Energy, Research and Industrial Policies; a member of the Delegation for the Relations to the United States of America; and a member of the Delegation to the Parliamentary Cooperation Committees in Central Asia.

From 1997, Swoboda served as vice-president of the European Parliament's delegation for relations with south-east Europe. Much of his parliamentary work is focused on the Balkans - he is chairman of the Parliamentarian Working Group on Western Balkans -, the Middle East, Turkey and the Maghreb. He was rapporteur for the Accession of Croatia to the European Union. In December 2011 he recommended Croatia's accession to the European Parliament which voted in favor with a great majority. Besides the above-mentioned, Swoboda focuses in his work in the Committee of Foreign Affairs on Central Asia and Russia.

In May 2013 Swoboda drew the anger of groups opposing Turkey's prime minister Recep Tayyip Erdoğan for cancelling a meeting with Turkish opposition leader Kemal Kılıçdaroğlu over a controversial statement of the latter.

After being leader of the Austrian Delegation of Social Democrats in the European Parliament, Swoboda became First Vice-President of the Progressive Alliance of Socialists and Democrats in the European Parliament and their Parliamentary Secretary.

== Other activities ==
- European Council on Foreign Relations (ECFR), Member

== Political positions ==
Besides his involvement in foreign affairs, Swoboda focuses on economic policies and questions of inclusion, as well as the fight against the rising right-wing extremism in Europe. He worked on the question of Roma discrimination in Europe, Swoboda went on several fact finding missions to get to know the situation. The experiences are discussed in his recently published book: Roma - A European Minority.

He is also a member of the Parliamentarian Working Group of the Advisory Board of "A Soul for Europe", an initiative that is building an international network with bases in Amsterdam, Berlin, Belgrade, Brussels, Porto and Tbilisi. Hannes Swoboda supported the European cause by signing the Spinelli Group Manifesto.

== Personal life ==
Hannes Swoboda enjoys painting and photography in his spare time. He is married to the former Austrian secretary of state for Europe and previous Siemens AG board member, Brigitte Ederer.

== Selected works ==
Recent Publications

- Hannes Swoboda, Jan Marinus Wiersma (Hg.) Politics of the Past: The Use and Abuse of History (2009), Brussels 2009
- Hannes Swoboda, Jan Marinus Wiersma (Hg.) Peace and Disarmament: A World without Nuclear Weapons? Brussels, 2009
- Hannes Swoboda, Jan Marinus Wiersma (Hg.) Democracy, Populism and Minority Rights, Brussels 2008
- Hannes Swoboda, Christophe Solioz (Hg.) Conflict and Renewal: Europe Transformed. Essays in Honour of Wolfgang Petritsch Nomos, Baden-Baden 2007

Reports in the European Parliament, Rapporteur Hannes Swoboda:

- Several Reports on Croatia's accession to the European Union until 2011
- Report on Croatia's 2006 progress, Committee on Foreign Affairs, March 2007
- Report on the proposal for a Council regulation on amending Council Regulation (EC) No 1080/2000 of 22 May 2000 on support for the United Nations Interim Mission in Kosovo (UNMIK) and the Office of the High Representative in Bosnia and Herzegovina (OHR) - Committee on Foreign Affairs, Human Rights, Common Security and Defence Policy, November 2003
- Report on ecopoints for heavy goods vehicles in transit through Austria, Committee on Regional Policy, Transport and Tourism, July 2001
- Report on EU assistance to Turkey in the framework of the pre-accession strategy and an Accession Partnership, Committee on Foreign Affairs, Human Rights, Common Security and Defence Policy, February 2001
- Report on licensing of railway undertakings (amendment of Directive 95/18/EC), allocation of capacity and levying of charges, Committee on Regional Policy, Transport and Tourism, January 2001
- Report on the Negotiation of a stabilisation and association agreement with the former Yugoslav Republic of Macedonia, Committee on Foreign Affairs, Human Rights, Common Security and Defence Policy, February 2000
- Report on Licensing of railway undertakings (amendment of Directive 95/18/EC), allocation of capacity and levying of charges, Committee on Transport and Tourism, February 1999 Report on the future development of relations with Turkey (communication from the Commission to the Council), Committee on Foreign Affairs, Security and Defence Policy, November 1998.

Party political offices
| Preceded by Martin Schulz | Leader of the Progressive Alliance of Socialists and Democrats; 2012–2014 | Succeeded by Martin Schulz |
