= 2009 European Parliament election in Austria =

- 4 June 2009

17 seats to the European Parliament
- Turnout: 45.97% (▲3.54 pp)
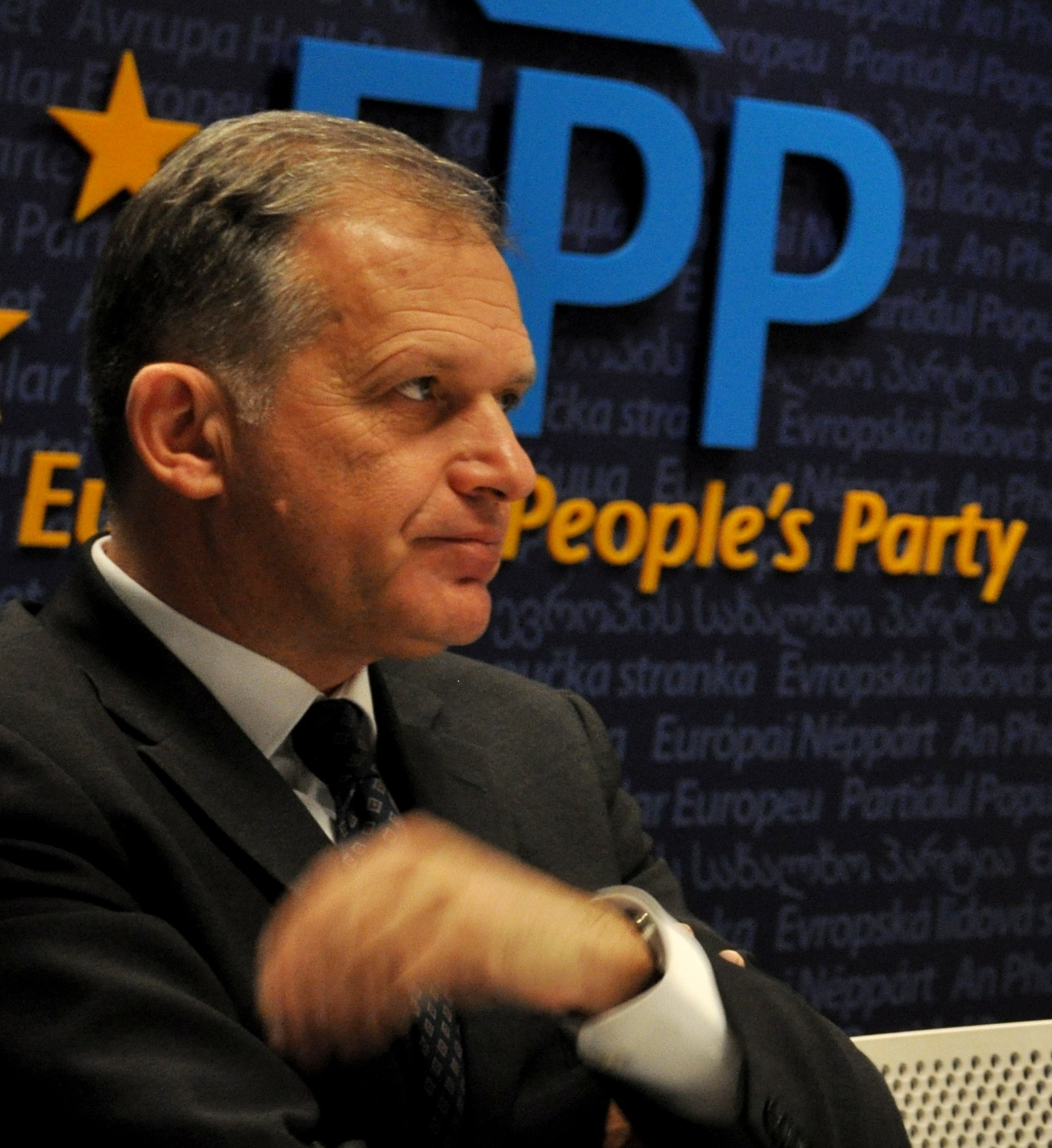

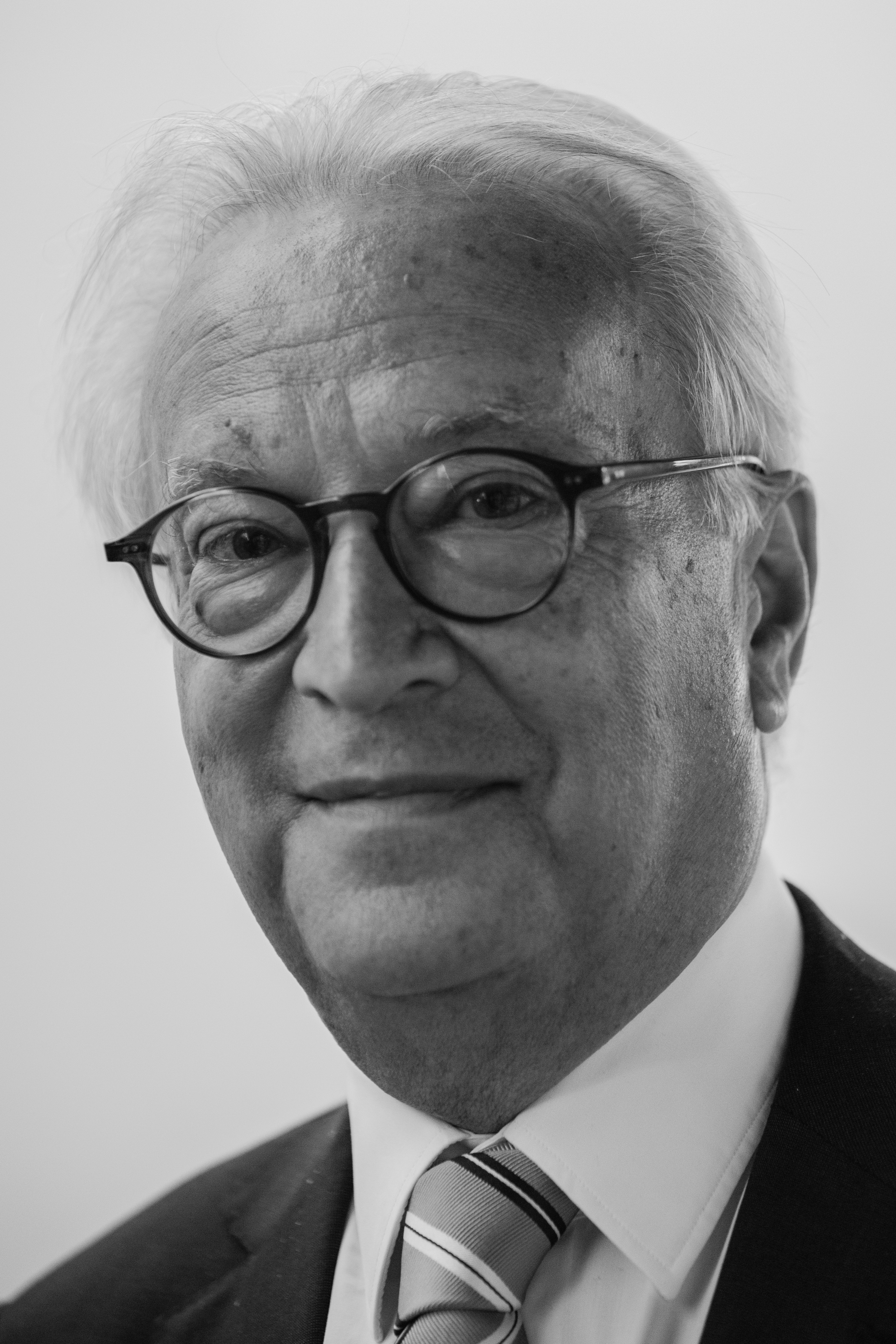

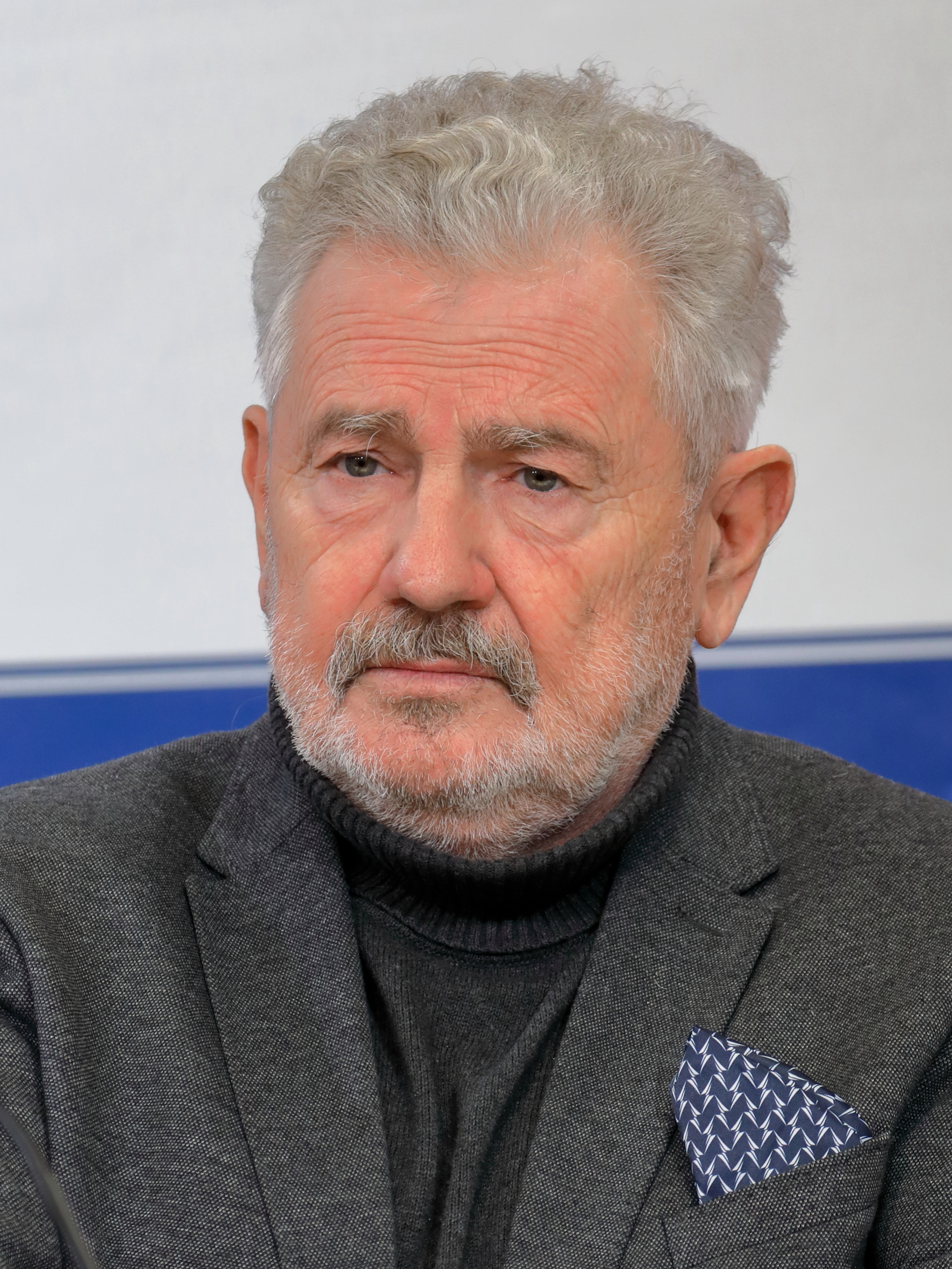

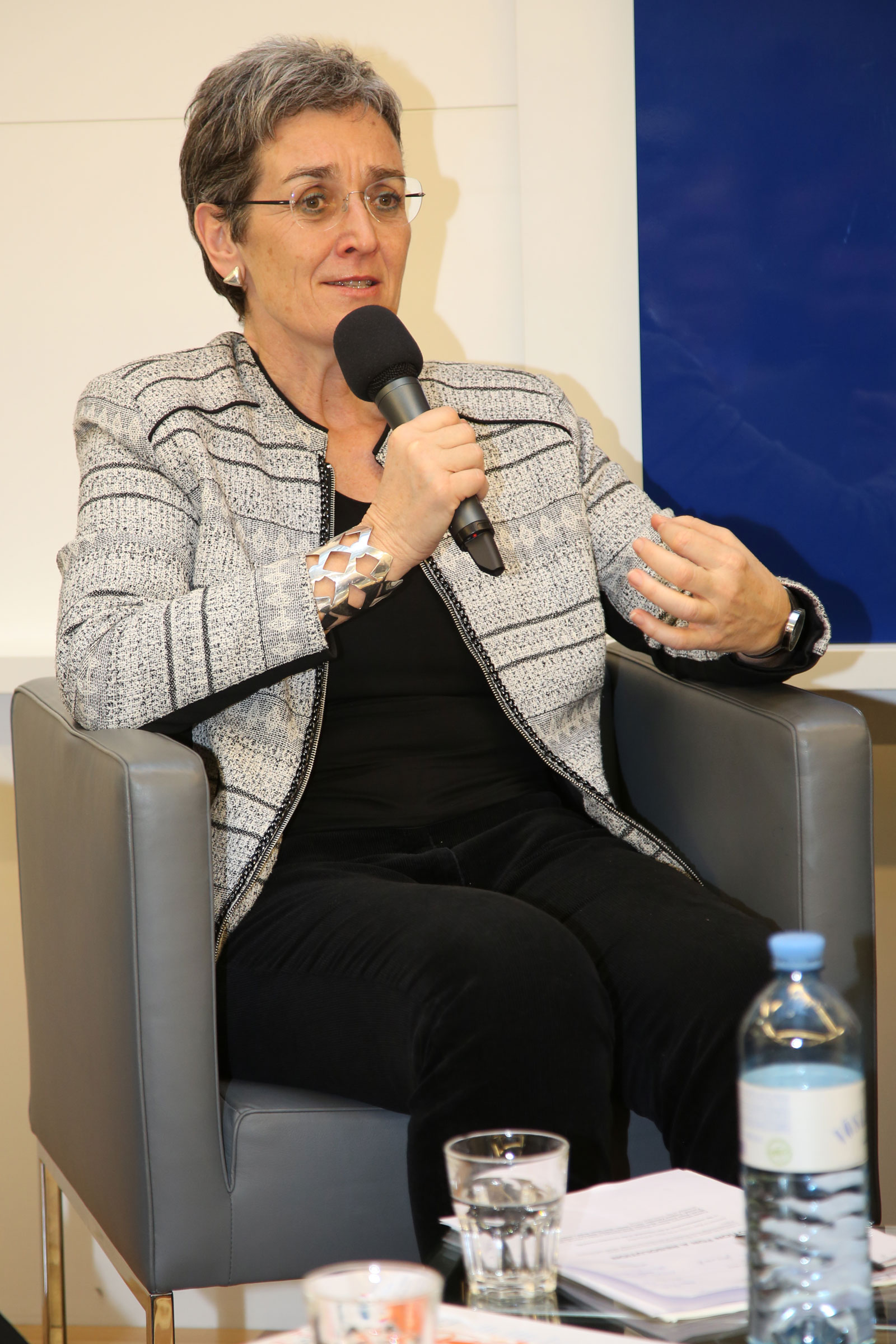

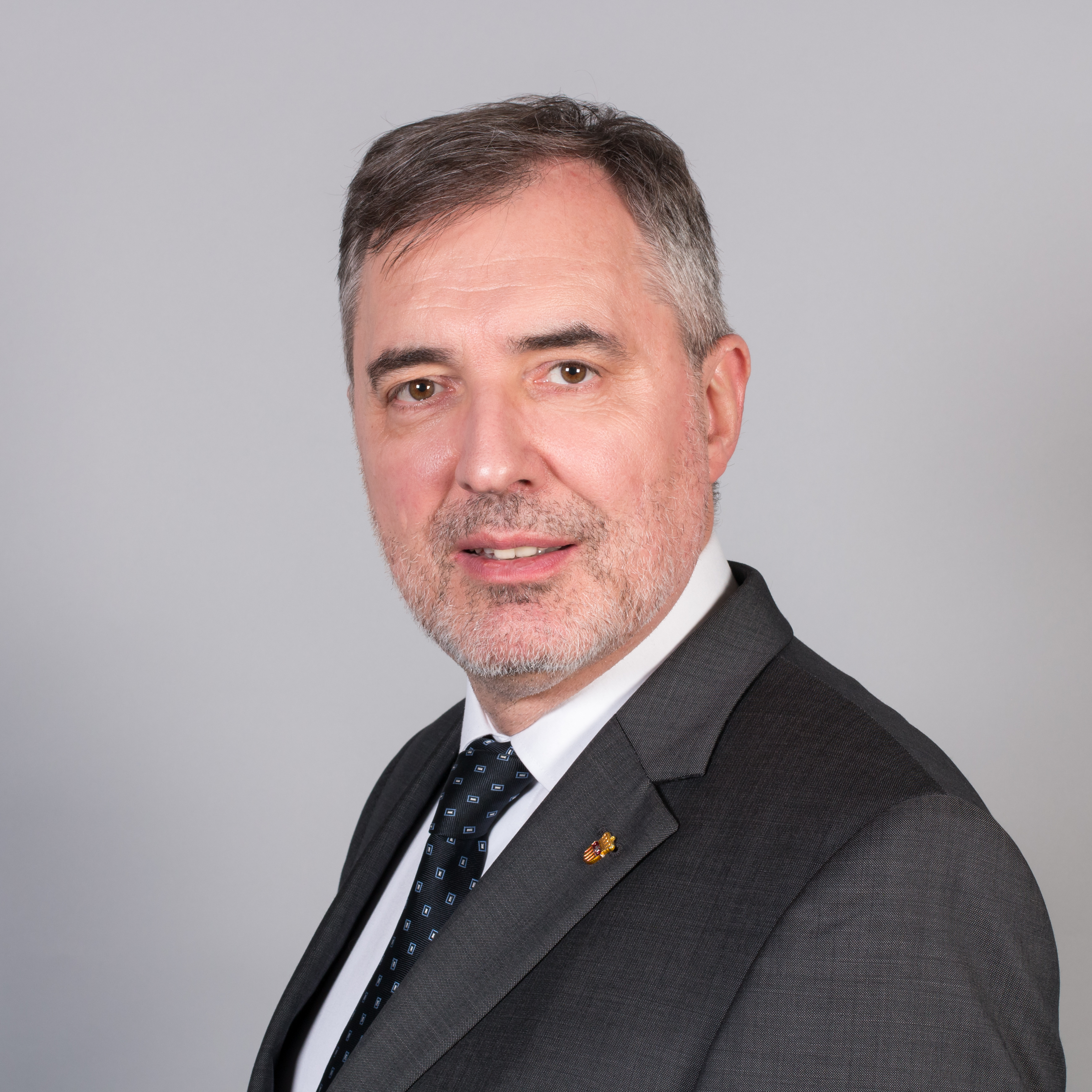
	First party	Second party	Third party
Leader	Ernst Strasser	Hannes Swoboda	Hans-Peter Martin
Party	ÖVP	SPÖ	Hans-Peter Martin's List
Alliance	EPP	PES
Last election	32.70%, 6 seats	33.33%, 7 seats	13.98%, 2 seats
Seats won	6	4 (5 post-Lisbon)	3
Seat change	0	▼3 (▼2)	▲1
Popular vote	858,921	680,041	506,092
Percentage	29.98%	23.74%	17.67%
Swing	▼2.72pp	▼9.59pp	▲3.69pp
	Fourth party	Fifth party	Sixth party
Leader	Andreas Mölzer	Ulrike Lunacek	Ewald Stadler
Party	FPÖ	Greens	BZÖ
Alliance		European Greens
Last election	6.31%, 1 seat	12.89%, 2 seats	–
Seats won	2	2	0 (1)
Seat change	▲1	0	New
Popular vote	364,207	284,505	131,261
Percentage	12.71%	9.93%	4.58%
Swing	▲6.40pp	▼2.96pp	New

An election was held in 2009 to elect the delegation from Austria to the European Parliament. Austria will have 17 seats in the European Parliament, instead of the 18 that the country had before the re-allocation of seats.

Through the Lisbon Treaty, the number of seats was graded to 19, so the SPÖ and BZÖ parties got additional seats, which are currently Observer MEPs.

== Contesting parties ==
=== SPÖ ===
The SPÖ announced that their frontrunner will be current MEP Hannes Swoboda.

=== ÖVP ===
The ÖVP surprisingly selected former Interior Minister Ernst Strasser to lead their party. 2004 frontrunner and MEP Othmar Karas, initially the favourite for the first place on the ÖVP party list, was listed in second place. Nonetheless, a large number of famous ÖVP members, including all living former ÖVP chairmen, launched a supporting committee for Karas.

=== FPÖ ===
Andreas Mölzer was selected to lead the FPÖ's lists again, and Heinz-Christian Strache claimed that up to 30% were possible; Mölzer stated that he wanted to reach 17.5% again, as in the 2008 elections.

=== Die Grünen ===
At the Greens' party congress on 17–18 January 2009, long-time MEP Johannes Voggenhuber was not selected for the first place on the party list, with Ulrike Lunacek being elected instead; Voggenhuber had announced he would not stand in any other place on the list and thus will withdraw from politics after the election. However, in the days after the decision, it was not ruled out that Voggenhuber might run on his own; he later emphatically stated he would not do that. It was announced in late January that he might stand in the 16th place on the list, making it possible for him to be ranked first in preferences with more than 7% of the Greens' votes in the election. The party leadership rejected this possibility in a meeting on 30 January 2009, angering many of the Greens' supporters. Cyriak Schwaighofer, the Greens' leader in Salzburg, then stated he would do what he could to get Voggenhuber on the list as a regional MEP candidate for Salzburg, but the Greens' leadership again rejected this idea.

=== BZÖ ===
The BZÖ picked Ewald Stadler to head their list; they did not want to run together with the Libertas Party, but stated that they were interested in cooperation after the election.

=== Hans-Peter Martin ===
MEP Hans-Peter Martin, who got 14% of the vote in the 2004 elections as an Independent, announced on 27 April that he would run again, stating he was sure he would defend his strong third-place showing in the 2004 elections.

=== Young Liberals ===
Liberal Forum MEP Karin Resetarits gave the Young Liberals (a sub-organisation of the LIF, both its youth party and its student organisation) the possibility to contest the election. It later emerged that the LIF would in fact have liked to contest the election, but that it had counted on Resetarits' signature in order to contest the election; as she had given it to the Young Liberals, they could stand in the election while the LIF could not.

=== KPÖ ===
The Communist Party of Austria announced on 7 March that it will participate in the elections under the list name "Communist Party of Austria – European Left".

== Opinion polls ==
Source	Date	SPÖ	ÖVP	MARTIN	GRÜNE	FPÖ	BZÖ	Others	Undecided
Gallup/Österreich	2009-06-02	27–29%	27–29%	12–14%	8–10%	14–16%	4–6%	–	–
Market/Standard	2009-06-01	28%	27%	15%	8%	17%	4%	1%	–
Karmasin/Profil	2009-05-28	27%	28%	13%	10%	15%	5%	2%	–
OGM/News	2009-05-27	26%	30%	14%	8%	16%	5%	1%	–
IFES/Heute	2009-05-25	27%	29%	10%	11%	16%	5%	2%	–
OGM/ORF	2009-05-24	29%	30%	11%	9%	14%	5%	2%	–
Market/Standard	2009-05-22	25%	27%	17%	10%	14%	3%	4%	–
Market/ORF-Eco	2009-05-08	29%	27%	13%	8%	16%	5%	2%	–
Gallup/Österreich	2009-05-08	31%	30%	8%	9%	17%	5%	–	–
OGM/News	2009-05-06	32%	29%	9%	10%	15%	5%	–	–
Karmasin/Profil	2009-05-02	30%	30%	9%	9%	17%	5%	–	–
OGM/News	2009-04-15	30%	32%	6%	9%	17%	5%	1%	–
Gallup/Österreich	2009-04-04	31–33%	30–32%	6–8%	8–10%	15–17%	3–5%	–	–
Peter Hayek/ATV	2009-04-01	31%	33%	10%	9%	10%	4%	3%	–
Manova/Presse	2009-04-01	33%	30%	3%	13%	13%	6%	2%	–
Gallup/Österreich	2009-03-27	30–32%	29–31%	7–9%	9-11%	15–17%	4–6%	–	–
Market/Standard	2009-03-25	30%	29%	8%	9%	15%	6%	3%	–
Gallup/Österreich	2009-03-13	30–32%	29–31%	7–9%	9-11%	15–17%	4–6%	–	–
Fessel-Gfk/Presse	2009-03-05	28%	25%	4%	8%	9%	–	–	26%

== Results ==
Party	Votes	%	Seats			
Party	Votes	%	Elected	+/–	Post-Lisbon	+/–
Austrian People's Party	858,921	29.98	6	0	6	0
Social Democratic Party of Austria	680,041	23.74	4	–3	5	+1
Hans-Peter Martin's List	506,092	17.67	3	+1	3	0
Freedom Party of Austria	364,207	12.71	2	+1	2	0
The Greens – The Green Alternative	284,505	9.93	2	0	2	0
Alliance for the Future of Austria	131,261	4.58	0	New	1	+1
Young Liberals	20,668	0.72	0	New	0	0
Communist Party of Austria	18,926	0.66	0	0	0	0
Total	2,864,621	100.00	17	–1	19	+2
Valid votes	2,864,621	97.93				
Invalid/blank votes	60,511	2.07				
Total votes	2,925,132	100.00				
Registered voters/turnout	6,362,761	45.97				
Source: Ministry of Interior
