= List of members of the European United Left–Nordic Green Left, 2009–14 =

This is a list of the members of the European Parliament group European United Left–Nordic Green Left (EUL/NGL) from 2009 until 2014.

== List ==
=== 7th European Parliament (2009–2014) ===
Name	National party	Country	Entered office	Left office
Ilda Figueiredo (replaced by Inês Zuber)	Democratic Unity Coalition (Communist Party)	Portugal	1999	2012
Bairbre de Brún (resigned; replaced by Martina Anderson)	Sinn Féin	United Kingdom	2004	2012
Nikólaos Chountís	Coalition of the Radical Left (2009–2015)	Greece	2004	2014
Jacky Hénin	Left Front (Communist Party)	France	2004	2014
Jaromír Kohlíček	Communist Party (Bohemia and Moravia)	Czech Republic	2004	2014
Kartika Liotard (left the SP; became an independent MEP)	Socialist Party (until 2010)	Netherlands	2004	2014
Kartika Liotard (left the SP; became an independent MEP)	Independent (after 2010)	Netherlands	2004	2014
Jiří Maštálka	Communist Party (Bohemia and Moravia)	Czech Republic	2004	2019
Thanasis Pafilis (resigned; replaced by Charalampos Angourakis)	Communist Party	Greece	2004	2009
Miguel Portas (died; replaced by Alda Sousa)	Left Bloc	Portugal	2004	2012
Miloslav Ransdorf	Communist Party (Bohemia and Moravia)	Czech Republic	2004	2016
Vladimír Remek (resigned; replaced by Věra Flasarová)	Communist Party (Bohemia and Moravia)	Czech Republic	2004	2013
Giorgos Toussas	Communist Party	Greece	2004	2014
Kyriacos Triantaphyllides	Progressive Party of Working People	Cyprus	2004	2014
Søren Søndergaard	People's Movement against the EU	Denmark	2007	2014
Charalampos Angourakis (died)	Communist Party	Greece	2009	2014
Joe Higgins (resigned; replaced by Paul Murphy)	Socialist Party	(Republic of Ireland) Ireland	2009	2011
Élie Hoarau (resigned; replaced by Younous Omarjee)	Left Front (Communist Party of Réunion)	France	2009	2012
Dennis de Jong	Socialist Party	Netherlands	2009	2019
Eva-Britt Svensson (resigned; replaced by Mikael Gustafsson)	Left Party	Sweden	2009	2011
Rui Tavares (left the EUL/NGL; became an independent MEP)	Left Bloc (until 2011)	Portugal	2009	2014
João Ferreira	Democratic Unity Coalition (Communist Party)	Portugal	2009	2021
Takis Hadjigeorgiou	Progressive Party of Working People	Cyprus	2009	2019
Patrick Le Hyaric	Left Front (Communist Party)	France	2009	2019
Marisa Matias	Left Bloc	Portugal	2009	2024
Willy Meyer	The Left (United Left)	Spain	2009	2014
Jean-Luc Mélenchon	Left Front (Left Party)	France	2009	2017
Alfrēds Rubiks	Harmony Centre	Latvia	2009	2014
Marie-Christine Vergiat	Left Front (Miscellaneous Left)	France	2009	2019
Mikael Gustafsson	Left Party	Sweden	2011	2014
Paul Murphy	Socialist Party	(Republic of Ireland) Ireland	2011	2014
Martina Anderson	Sinn Féin	United Kingdom	2012	2020
Younous Omarjee	Left Front (Communist Party of Réunion)	France	2012	present
Alda Sousa	Left Bloc	Portugal	2012	2014
Inês Zuber	Democratic Unity Coalition (Communist Party)	Portugal	2012	2016
Nikola Vuljanić	Labourists–Labour Party	Croatia	2013	2014
Věra Flasarová	Communist Party (Bohemia and Moravia)	Czech Republic	2014	2014
