= Public Eye on Davos =

Event

The Public Eye on Davos was an annual event held every year between 2000 and 2015, as a protest or counter-event to the annual meeting of the World Economic Forum in Davos, Switzerland.

The project was coordinated by Swiss organizations Erklärung von Bern (EvB, renamed "Public Eye" in 2016) and Greenpeace Switzerland, and included participants associated with a variety of non-governmental organizations (NGOs). The Public Eye is a platform for substantial criticism of what they describe as "purely profit-oriented globalization". The focus of the Public Eye Awards since 2005 has been on promoting their version of corporate social responsibility. In 2009, the Positive category was for the first time awarded for a courageous employee for their exemplary contributions. Public Eye on Davos issued an annual award, ironically, to companies they perceived as harmful and motivated only by profits.

== History ==
The Public Eye was first held in the year 2000 to accompany the World Economic Forum (WEF) in Davos critically. Together with the newspaper WOZ, they organized an event under the name ″Who rules the world″ and organized a public discussion with the president of the WEF, Klaus Schwab. In the following year, the Public Eye was extended to a multiple day counter-conference with 20 participants from NGOs and critical scientists. They also followed the WEF to New York in 2002, where the President of the Swiss Confederation, Kaspar Villiger, opened the conference.

In 2005, they introduced the Public Eye Awards as a renewal of the event, which was in future the main event of the Public Eye on Davos. In 2007, after Pro Natura stopped working on the event because the use of the event was too one-sited on the organizers of the WEF, Greenpeace was beside Erklärung von Bern the new organizing partner of the event. The Public Eye celebrated its ten-year anniversary on 28 January 2009. In 2015, Davos was for the last time the venue of the Public Eye Award with Chevron Corporation as winner of the lifetime award.

== Laureates ==
Public Eye Award
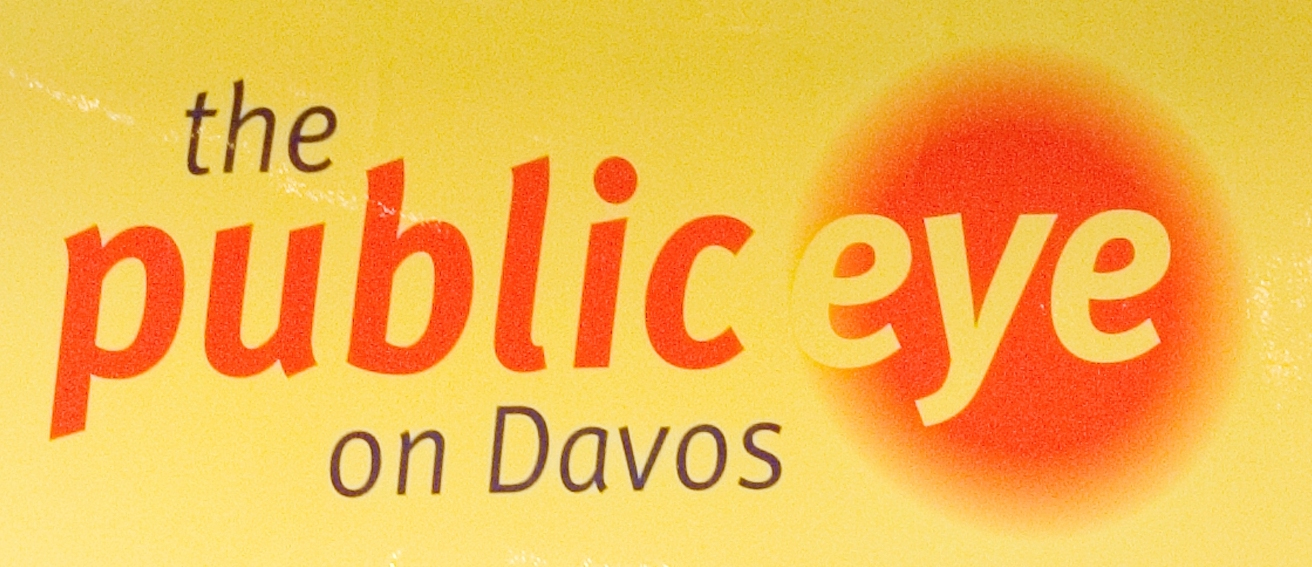
- Awarded for: Purely profit-oriented globalisation (bad corporate environmental or social responsibility)
- Date: 2000-2015
- Country: Switzerland
- Presented by: Public Eye and (since 2009) Greenpeace Switzerland
- Website: http://www.publiceye.org/

=== 2015 ===
- Winner of the Lifetime Award: Chevron Corporation

Chevron was 'awarded' namely for its activities of the past 10 years in Bolivia, that caused enormous ecological damage.

According to Schweiz aktuell broadcast on 16 January 2015, a public presence during the WEF 2015 may not be guaranteed because the massively increased security in Davos. The Public Eye Award will be awarded for the last time in Davos: Public Eyes says Goodbye to Davos, confirmed by the Rolf Marugg (now Landrats politician), by not directly engaged politicians, and by the police responsible. As communicated before by Erklärung von Bern on 19 November 2014, following the announcement of the Lifetime Award winner on 23 January 2015, a closing conference will be held, with the participation of the Yes Men, Sven Giegold, the Attac co-founder and European Parliamentarian, and Adrian Monck as Managing Director and Head of Public Engagement of the WEF association, as well as Noreena Hertz, economy professor and best-selling author.

=== 2014 ===
- Winners: Gazprom, Gap

In December 2013, Gazprom became the first company in the world to start drilling for oil in the Arctic Barents Sea. Since the drilling began, the corporation has already violated several federal safety and environmental regulations. Fashion giant Gap has refused to sign the binding agreement «Accord on Fire and Building Safety in Bangladesh». Instead, it is actively undermining serious reform by promoting a non-binding corporate-controlled program.

=== 2013 ===
- Winners: People's Award: Shell, Jury Award: Goldman Sachs

Nominees were Coal India, G4S, Lonmin, and Repower

=== 2012 ===
- Winners: People's award: Vale, Jury award: Barclays

Nominees were Freeport, TEPCO, Samsung and Syngenta

=== 2011 ===
- Audience award: Neste Oil, Jury award: AngloGold Ashanti

Nominees were Axpo (a Swiss energy company), BP, Foxconn and Philip Morris

=== 2010 ===
- Winners: 2x Roche (Swiss, People), Royal Bank of Canada (Global), water mandate of UN Global Compact (Greenwash)

The Public Eye Award in the category Swiss and People was given to the Swiss health care-company for the selling of the drug Cellcept in China, where over 90% of the organs for transplantation comes from executed prisoners - against their own will.

Nominees: International Olympic Committee

=== 2009 ===
- Winners: 2x Newmont Mining Corporation (Global, People), BKW FMB Energie AG (Swiss)
- Positive Award: Freddy Lozano and Jairo Quiroz Delgado, executive members from the trade union Sintracarbon.

Newmont received the 2009 award for its Akyem project in Ghana. According to the jury, it had destroyed unique natural habitats, carried out forced resettlement of local people and polluted soil and rivers. Newmont described the information as misleading and said the project had been extensively studied by international and national environmental experts, members of the local communities, and by the appropriate governmental agencies and departments.

BWFK FMB Energie AG received the Swiss Award for their participation at German coal-burning power plants and the same time propagation of power efficiency and renewable energy in Switzerland.

The positive Award was given to two members of the union Sintracarbon in Colombia for their fight for better work conditions for the workers in the country's biggest coal mine (El Cerrejón).

=== 2008 ===
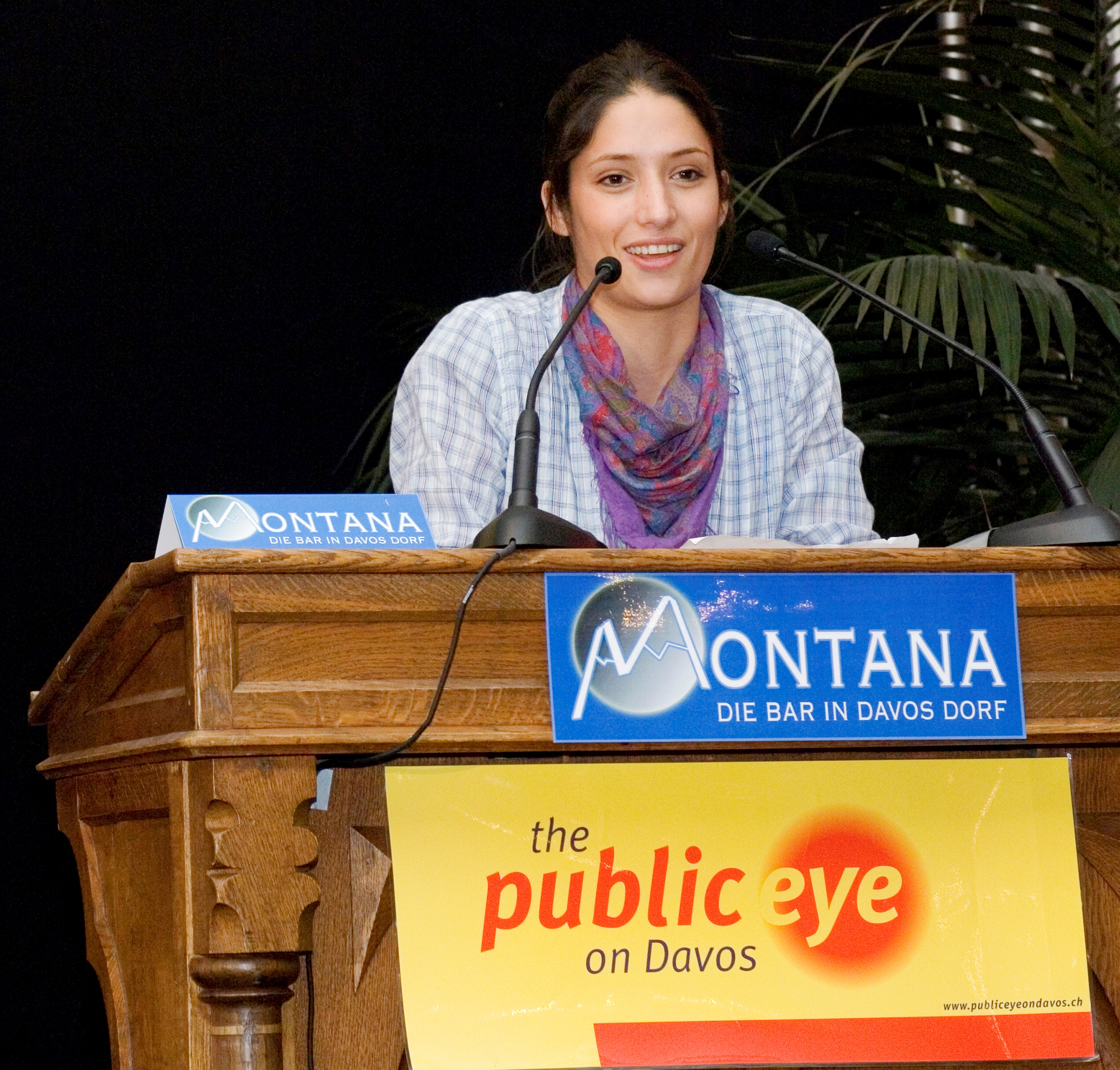
Melanie Winiger at the Public Eye Awards 2008.

- Winners: 2x Areva (Global, People), Glencore (Swiss)
- Positive Award: Hess Natur

Both the People's Award and the Global Award were given to French state-owned Areva for the suppression of true health conditions of uranium mine workers at subsidiaries Somaïr and Cominak in northern Niger. Therefore, the hospitals would diagnose patients with HIV when they were actually displaying symptoms of cancer caused by radioactive contamination of air, water and soil. Glencore was "honored" for its opaque business practices and unacceptable labor rights in Colombian coal mines.

The Positive Award went to Hess Natur, Germany's largest mail-order house for natural fabrics, for its social and ecological involvement that stresses fair trade of its raw materials.

=== 2007 ===
- Winners: Bridgestone (Global), Novartis (Swiss)
- Positive Award: Coop (Switzerland)

Bridgestone received the Global Award for the disastrous working conditions at a subsidiary in Liberia. The workers lived in mud huts, the children were forced to work, and they had to handle highly toxic materials without protection. Novartis received the Swiss Award for the patenting of the cancer drug Imatinib, forcing a halt in production of Indian generics. As a result, ten thousand patients worldwide could no longer afford medication that slowed the spread of leukemia. The product from Novartis is ten times more expensive than the generics.

Coop received the Positive Award for its dedication to ecological products and farming in Switzerland.

=== 2006 ===
- Winners: Chevron (Environment), citigroup (Taxes), The Walt Disney Company (Social)
- Positive Award: Euzkadi Union SNRTE, Germanwatch and FIAN

For 30 years, Chevron allowed highly toxic waste water to flow into the Amazon in Ecuador, and for cost-saving reasons it did not pump the waste water back into the earth, which was normal practice at the time. Chevron refuses to pay for the environmental consequences and the health problems of the local communities. Citigroup received its award for the unscrupulous advice it gave to tax evaders. Disney produces toys in China and does not disclose the names of the suppliers, thus protecting them from industry monitoring.

The Positive Award was given to the three organizations for their efforts against the unlawful closure of a Continental tire factory in Mexico, in which all of the organizations’ demands were met.

=== 2005 ===
- Winners: Dow (Human Rights), Shell (Environment), Wal-Mart (Labor Rights), KPMG (Taxes)

Dow received its award for the refusal to accept any responsibility for the 1984 catastrophe in Bhopal. Dow merged with the company responsible for the accident. Shell received its award for gas flaring in Nigeria in residential areas. Wal-Mart denies responsibility for working conditions at its suppliers. KPMG received its award for encouraging its clients to practice aggressive tax evasion.
