= Public Eye (organization) =

Swiss NGO

- Founded: 1968; 58 years ago
- Purpose: Sustainability, International development and social service
- Location(s): Lausanne and Zürich
- Origins: manifesto on “Switzerland and the Developing Countries“ by a group of theologians
- Region served: Switzerland related sustainability topics of involved Swiss companies worldwide
- Method: It demands in magazines and information campaigns, the creation of fair trade conditions, but also addressed nutrition awareness and health issues, among other things, the use of pesticides, biotechnology and genetic engineering and drug policy.
- Members: 25,000 (2015)
- Official language: German and French
- Key people: • Pierrette Rohrbach, chairwomen since 2007 • Andreas Cassee, vice-chairman since 2010 • Fabrizio Cioldi, vice-chairman since 2002
- Subsidiaries: Regional groups in Aarau, Basel, Bern, Central Switzerland, Geneva, Lausanne, St. Gallen, Winterthur and Zürich
- Volunteers: About 200
- Website: www.publiceye.ch

Public Eye is a non-governmental organisation based in Switzerland, with the stated goals of sustainability-oriented, politically and religiously independent solidarity development.

Public Eye notably encourages Swiss politics and business to respect human rights and the environment in poor countries.

== History and orientation ==
Erklärung von Bern (translation: Declaration from Bern), was founded in 1968 by the merger of signatories to a manifesto on “Switzerland and the Developing Countries“ by a group of theologians, which objected to the growing differences in prosperity between the so-called first world and the third world. One thousand people signed the consequently called Erklärung von Bern ("Bern Declaration"), pledging among other things to contribute 3% of their income towards development cooperation. On 6 January 1969 the manifesto was presented to the Swiss Federal Council.

In 1971, the movement was constituted into an association. Funded by donations the organization grew to 18,000 members by the late 1970s. At the annual general assembly in 2012, the regional branches were amalgamated into one overall national organization. As of 2016, the NGO is supported by over 25,000 members.

As a representative of the so-called dependency theory, the founder involved especially for the elimination of the dependency of the so-called developing countries by the developed countries and for a sustainable development cooperation. EvB also participated in the 1970s in the drafting of the Federal Law on Development Cooperation, and in 1992 related to the referendum against Switzerland's accession to the International Monetary Fund.

=== Renaming to Public Eye ===
Logo until September 2016

Logo since September 2016

At the general assembly on 23 May 2016, the members decided to change their organisation's name to Public Eye. EvB announced that the NGO's new name is forward-looking, and is already well established thanks to the former counter-summit of the same name that they organised to protest against the Davos World Economic Forum for 15 years. It is believed that Public Eye is more representative of the values, aims and methods of the organisation, and focuses on the issue of "business and human rights". The name change was implemented in mid-September 2016.

== Goals ==
In general, EvD demands in magazines and information campaigns, the creation of fair trade conditions, but also addressed nutrition awareness and health issues, among other things, the use of pesticides, biotechnology and genetic engineering and drug policy.

The focus is to improve the living conditions of the so-called underprivileged populations in other countries, so the EvB declared long-term aims. According to the aims, Switzerland has to formulate its policies in such a way that the Swiss economy does not prosper at the cost of other countries and their populations, by using its membership in international and multilateral organizations Switzerland. Therefore, also campaigns for fair relations between industrialized and so-called developing countries are to organize, as Switzerland is one of the financially richest nations in the world. There are also legally binding regulations to be established, on a national and international level – which compel also business enterprises based in Switzerland to adopt a just, sustainable and social code of conduct, and which render a company's observance of its responsibilities verifiable. According to the EvB's aims, enterprises based in Switzerland assume their corporate social responsibility. Multicorporate enterprises are committed to respecting human rights, labour laws and conventions, as well as socio-ethical, ecological, and peace-keeping norms of conduct, by supporting the entire value creation chain. The Swiss population has to be informed about the conduct of the Swiss business enterprises, and the Swiss policies with respect to developing countries, and therefore to enable the Swiss people to decide and act in a responsible fashion. EvB aims also to increase the awareness of the population with respect to their purchasing decisions, thus creating consumer attitudes which promote equitable economic relations with partner countries.

To achieve these aims, EvB carries out research and gathers information on issues of global justice, with a focus on economic issues and human rights. It also urges politicians and the Swiss government to aim fairer relations with poorer countries and calls on business enterprises to assume their social and ecological responsibilities worldwide and to respect human rights. EvB raises the level of awareness of the population with respect to conscious and sustainable consumption, and networks at home and abroad with other non-governmental organizations and grassroots movements.

== Projects ==
=== Public Eye Award ===
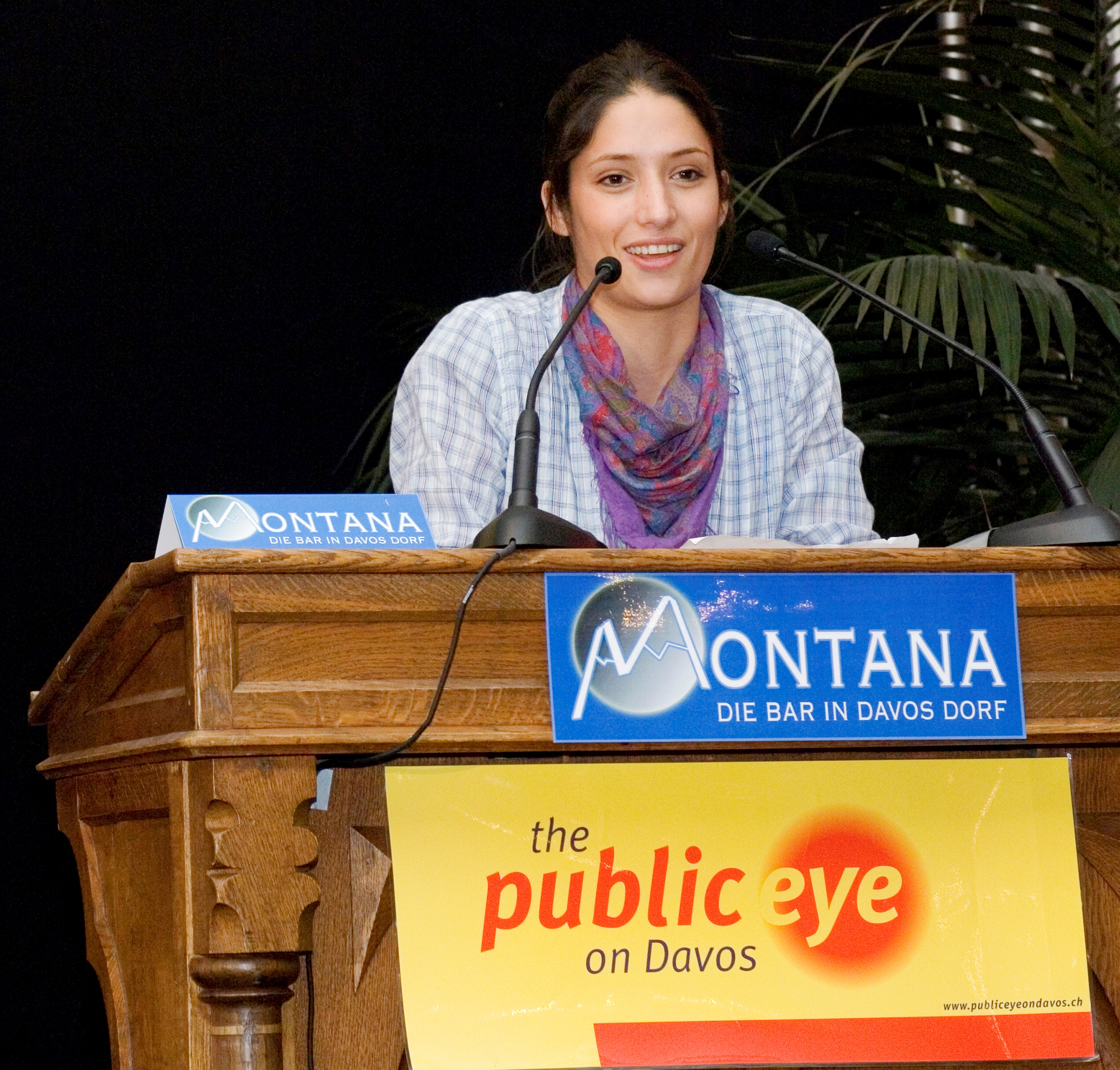
Melanie Winiger at the Public Eye Awards 2008

From 2000 to 2015, the Public Eye Awards event has been held by EvB and Greenpeace Switzerland in Davos as a counter-event to the annual meeting of the World Economic Forum (WEF), and to spotlight irresponsible business practices. Public Eye was intended as a counter-public view to the closed elitist circle of the WEF. Since 2005 Public Eye has awarded prizes for shameful conduct in order to draw attention to the dark side of the globalization championed by the WEF, and NGO's from over 50 countries have already nominated corporations for the Public Eye Awards. Following the announcement of the Lifetime Award winner on 23 January 2015, a closing conference was held in Davos, with the participation of the Yes Men, Sven Giegold, the Association for the Taxation of Financial Transactions and for Citizens' Action Attac co-founder and European Parliamentarian, and Adrian Monck as Managing Director and Head of Public Engagement of the WEF association, as well as Noreena Hertz, economy professor and best-selling author. According to Schweiz aktuell broadcast on 16 January 2015, a last public presence during the 2015 WEF was not guaranteed because of the massively increased security in Davos, which was confirmed by local politicians and by the police official.
