= Turkey-EU Joint Parliamentary Committee =

The Turkey-EU Joint Parliamentary Committee (JPC) is established on the basis of the European Parliament's resolution of 14 May 1965 and the resolutions of the Turkish National Assembly and the Turkish Senate, adopted respectively on 22 June and 14 July 1965, and on the basis of the decision of the European Economic Community-Turkey Association Council of 27 July 1965.

== General information ==
The task of the Committee shall be to consider issues related to Turkey's accession process. Within this context, the Committee is entrusted to follow, analyse and evaluate issues related to all existing bilateral arrangements between Turkey and the EU starting with the Association Agreement signed in Ankara on 12 September 1963 between Turkey and the EEC, the decisions of the Association Council as well as the accession negotiations which started on 3 October 2005 at the Turkey-EU Intergovernmental Accession Conference. Furthermore, the Committee is entrusted with strengthening the relations between the Turkish Grand National Assembly and the European Parliament.

The Committee may also consider all issues within the context of the Turkey-EU relations in accordance with the mandate given by the Turkish Grand National Assembly and the European Parliament.

== Organization of the JPC ==
The Committee shall be composed, in equal numbers, of members appointed by the European Parliament and members appointed by the Turkish Grand National Assembly. The Bureau of the Committee shall be composed of the Chairperson of the delegation of the European Parliament, the Chairperson of the delegation of the Turkish Grand National Assembly, and several Vice-Chairpersons of each delegation.

== Sessions of the JPC ==
The Committee shall, in principle, meet three times a year. It shall be convened by the Chairperson-in-office, after consulting the other Chairperson. The notice of the meeting shall include a draft agenda drawn up by the Bureau and shall normally be sent to members a fortnight in advance. In principle, sessions shall be held by turns in Turkey and in one of the workplaces of the European Parliament.

Meetings of the Committee will be held in public unless the Committee decides otherwise. Members of the Association Council, Members of the European Commission and of the Council of the European Union, and Members of the Government of Turkey as well as any person may, by decision of the Bureau, be invited to attend and speak at a meeting.

The official languages of the Committee shall be the official languages of the European Parliament and the Turkish.

== Members of the delegation of the Turkish Grand National Assembly ==
Member	Political party	Constituency area
İSMAİL EMRAH KARAYEL (President)	Justice and Development Party (AKP)	Istanbul
JALE NUR SÜLLÜ (Vice-president)	Republican People's Party (CHP)	Eskişehir
KONUR ALP KOÇAK (Vice-president)	Nationalist Movement Party (MHP)	Konya
ALİ ŞAHİN	Justice and Development Party (AKP)	Gaziantep
MESUT BOZATLI	Justice and Development Party (AKP)	Gaziantep
CANTÜRK ALAGÖZ	Justice and Development Party (AKP)	Iğdır
MÜŞERREF PERVİN TUBA DURGUT	Justice and Development Party (AKP)	Istanbul
MURAT CAHİD CINGI	Justice and Development Party (AKP)	Kayseri
MERYEM GÖKA	Justice and Development Party (AKP)	Konya
ABDURRAHMAN BABACAN	Justice and Development Party (AKP)	Malatya
AHMET MÜCAHİT ARINÇ	Justice and Development Party (AKP)	Manisa
EMRE ÇALIŞKAN	Justice and Development Party (AKP)	Nevşehir
ÇİĞDEM KARAASLAN	Justice and Development Party (AKP)	Samsun
BURHAN KAYATÜRK	Justice and Development Party (AKP)	Van
ÖZGÜR ERDEM İNCESU	Republican People's Party (CHP)	Ardahan
SERVET MULLAOĞLU	Republican People's Party (CHP)	Hatay
MEHMET SALİH UZUN	Republican People's Party (CHP)	İzmir
YÜKSEL TAŞKIN	Republican People's Party (CHP)	İzmir
FAHRİ ÖZKAN	Republican People's Party (CHP)	Kırklareli
ZUHAL KARAKOÇ	Nationalist Movement Party (MHP)	Kahramanmaraş
CEYLAN AKÇA CUPOLO	Peoples' Equality and Democracy Party (DEM)	Diyarbakır
OSMAN CENGİZ ÇANDAR	Peoples' Equality and Democracy Party (DEM)	Diyarbakır
AYŞEGÜL DOĞAN	Peoples' Equality and Democracy Party (DEM)	Şırnak
LÜTFÜ TÜRKKAN	Good Party (İYİ Parti)	Kocaeli
MUSTAFA KAYA	New Path (Yeni Yol)	Istanbul

== Members of the delegation of the European Parliament ==
Member	Political group	Country
Hélène FLAUTRE (President)	The Greens–European Free Alliance (EFA/G)	France
Maria Eleni KOPPA (Vice-president)	Progressive Alliance of Socialists and Democrats (S&D)	Greece
Georgios KOUMOUTSAKOS (Vice-president)	European People's Party (EPP)	Greece
Philippe BOULLAND	European People's Party (EPP)	France
Anna Maria CORAZZA BILDT	European People's Party (EPP)	Sweden
Andrew DUFF	Alliance of Liberals and Democrats for Europe (ALDE)	United Kingdom
James ELLES	European Conservatives and Reformists (ECR)	United Kingdom
İsmail ERTUĞ	Progressive Alliance of Socialists and Democrats (S&D)	Germany
Takis HADJIGEORGIOU	European United Left–Nordic Green Left (GUE/NGL)	Cyprus
Richard HOWITT	Progressive Alliance of Socialists and Democrats (S&D)	United Kingdom
Sophia in 't VELD	Alliance of Liberals and Democrats for Europe (ALDE)	Netherlands
Cătălin Sorin IVAN	Progressive Alliance of Socialists and Democrats (S&D)	Romania
Liisa JAAKONSAARI	Progressive Alliance of Socialists and Democrats (S&D)	Finland
Metin KAZAK	Alliance of Liberals and Democrats for Europe (ALDE)	Bulgaria
Franziska KELLER	The Greens–European Free Alliance (EFA/G)	Germany
Barbara MATERA	European People's Party (EPP)	Italy
Morten MESSERSCHMIDT	Europe of Freedom and Democracy (EFD)	Denmark
Antigoni PAPADOPOULOU	Progressive Alliance of Socialists and Democrats (S&D)	Cyprus
Birgit SCHNIEBER-JASTRAM	European People's Party (EPP)	Germany
Renate SOMMER	European People's Party (EPP)	Germany
Laurence J.A.J. STASSEN	-	Netherlands
Eleni THEOCHAROUS	European People's Party (EPP)	Cyprus
Marianne THYSSEN	European People's Party (EPP)	Belgium
Jarosław Leszek WAŁĘSA	European People's Party (EPP)	Poland
Jan ZAHRADIL	European Conservatives and Reformists (ECR)	Czech Republic

== The secretariat of the Committee ==
The secretariat of the Committee shall be provided by the secretariat of the Turkish Grand National Assembly and of the European Parliament.
