= Members of the European Parliament (2009–2014) =

This is a list giving breakdowns of the members serving in the European Parliament session from 2009 to 2014, following the 2009 election. For a full single list, see: List of members of the European Parliament 2009–2014.

== MEPs ==
- MEPs for Austria 2009–2014
- MEPs for Belgium 2009–2014
- MEPs for Bulgaria 2009–2014
- MEPs for Croatia 2013–2014
- MEPs for Cyprus 2009–2014
- MEPs for the Czech Republic 2009–2014
- MEPs for Denmark 2009–2014
- MEPs for Estonia 2009–2014
- MEPs for Finland 2009–2014
- MEPs for France 2009–2014
- MEPs for Germany 2009–2014
- MEPs for Greece 2009–2014
- MEPs for Hungary 2009–2014
- MEPs for Ireland 2009–2014
- MEPs for Italy 2009–2014
- MEPs for Latvia 2009–2014
- MEPs for Lithuania 2009–2014
- MEPs for Luxembourg 2009–2014
- MEPs for Malta 2009–2014
- List of members of the European Parliament for the Netherlands, 2009–2014
- MEPs for Poland 2009–2014
- MEPs for Portugal 2009–2014
- MEPs for Romania 2009–2014
- MEPs for Slovakia 2009–2014
- MEPs for Slovenia 2009–2014
- MEPs for Spain 2009–2014
- MEPs for Sweden 2009–2014
- MEPs for the United Kingdom 2009–2014

== Observers ==
- Observers for Croatia 2012–2013
