= Alternatiba =

Alternatiba may refer to:

- Alternatiba (Basque political party), an independent political party organized in the Southern Basque Country
- Alternatiba, Village of Alternatives, a framework to mobilize society to face the challenges of climate change by organizing numerous Villages of Alternatives named Alternatiba
