= Merchandization =

Merchandization is a critical term coined by the anti-globalization movement to designate the process of changing the viewpoint of individuals or society towards an object, service, or substance. Things that were formerly thought of as "simply being there" are now being thought of as commodities for sale and corporate profit. This change in viewpoint is called the merchandization of an object.

For example, anti-globalization and anti-capitalism activists claim that in today's society, many things, including health care, culture, and education, are becoming mere merchandise.

Marx discussed this "fetishism of commodities" in the nineteenth century.

Political Economy has indeed analysed, however incompletely, value and its magnitude, and has discovered what lies beneath these forms. But it has never once asked the question why labour is represented by the value of its product and labour time by the magnitude of that value. These formulas, which bear it stamped upon them in unmistakable letters that they belong to a state of society, in which the process of production has the mastery over man, instead of being controlled by him, such formulas appear to the bourgeois intellect to be as much a self-evident necessity imposed by Nature as productive labour itself. Hence forms of social production that preceded the bourgeois form, are treated by the bourgeoisie in much the same way as the Fathers of the Church treated pre-Christian religions. . . . . Could commodities themselves speak, they would say: Our use value may be a thing that interests men. It is no part of us as objects. What, however, does belong to us as objects, is our value. Our natural intercourse as commodities proves it. In the eyes of each other we are nothing but exchange values.

— Karl Marx, Das Kapital, volume one, part I.1.4

In other words, something may have usefulness, but it has no value unless it can be exchanged in the marketplace for something else considered to have value. That value may come because it fills a need through consumption or is further exchanged. In this way, labor, time, and natural resources have come to serve the market instead of the other way around.

The slogan of ATTAC is "the World is not Merchandise" (le monde n'est pas une marchandise).

A related theoretical framework is Karl Polanyi's concept of "fictitious commodities," developed in his 1944 work The Great Transformation. Polanyi argued that land, labour, and money are the three principal things treated as market commodities in self-regulated economies, despite not having been produced for sale. Labour, in his view, is simply human activity inseparable from life itself; land is another name for nature; and money is a means of exchange created through banking or state finance rather than through production. Polanyi considered this fictitious treatment a necessary condition for the functioning of market societies, but one that generated internal contradictions requiring social countermovements to correct. His framework has been widely applied by anti-globalization scholars to analyse how processes of merchandization extend beyond goods into domains such as healthcare, education, and natural resources.

== See also ==
- Anti-capitalism
