= Diogo Feio =

Portuguese lawyer, university lecturer, and politician (b. 1970)

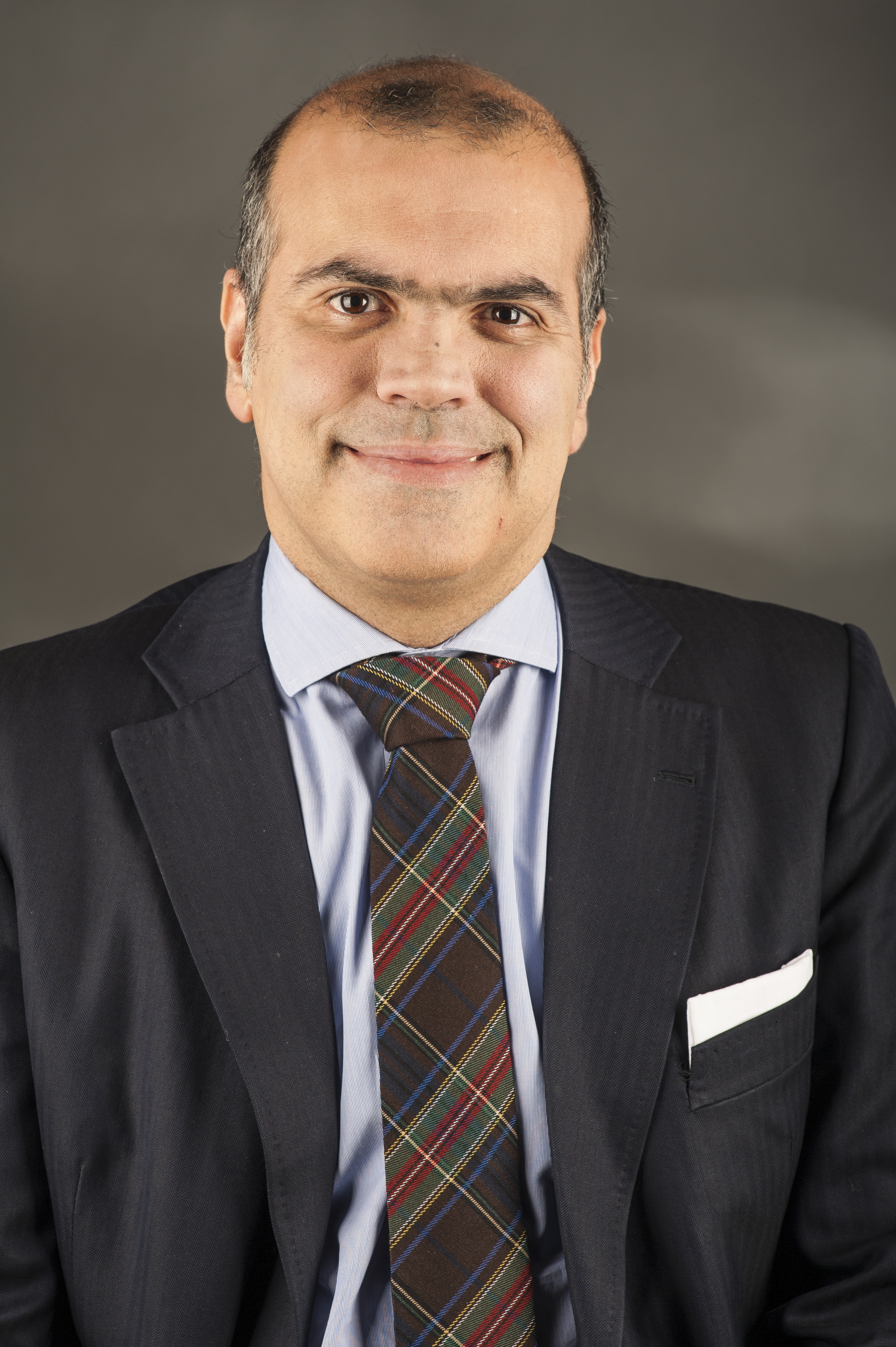

Member of the European Parliament
- In office July 14, 2009 – June 30, 2014

Personal details
- Born: October 6, 1970 (age 55) Porto, Portugal
- Party: CDS – People's Party
- Occupation: Lawyer, university lecturer and politician.

Diogo Nuno de Gouveia Torres Feio (October 6, 1970, Porto, Portugal) is a Portuguese lawyer, University Lecturer and politician.

== Biography ==
Diogo Feio obtained a law degree from the Faculty of Law of the Portuguese Catholic University, a master's degree in Legal and Economic Sciences from the Faculty of Law of the University of Coimbra and a doctorate in the same area from the Faculty of Law of the University of Porto.

A member of the People's Party (CDS–PP), he was a member of the Portuguese Parliament and president of the CDS-PP Parliamentary Group. In 2005, he joined the 16th Constitutional Government (Santana Lopes) as Secretary of State for Education.

In the 2009 European elections, he was elected to the European Parliament as a member of the Group of the European People's Party (Christian Democrats) and European Democrats, concluding his mandate in 2015.
