= Antigoni Papadopoulou =

Greek Cypriot politician and chemist

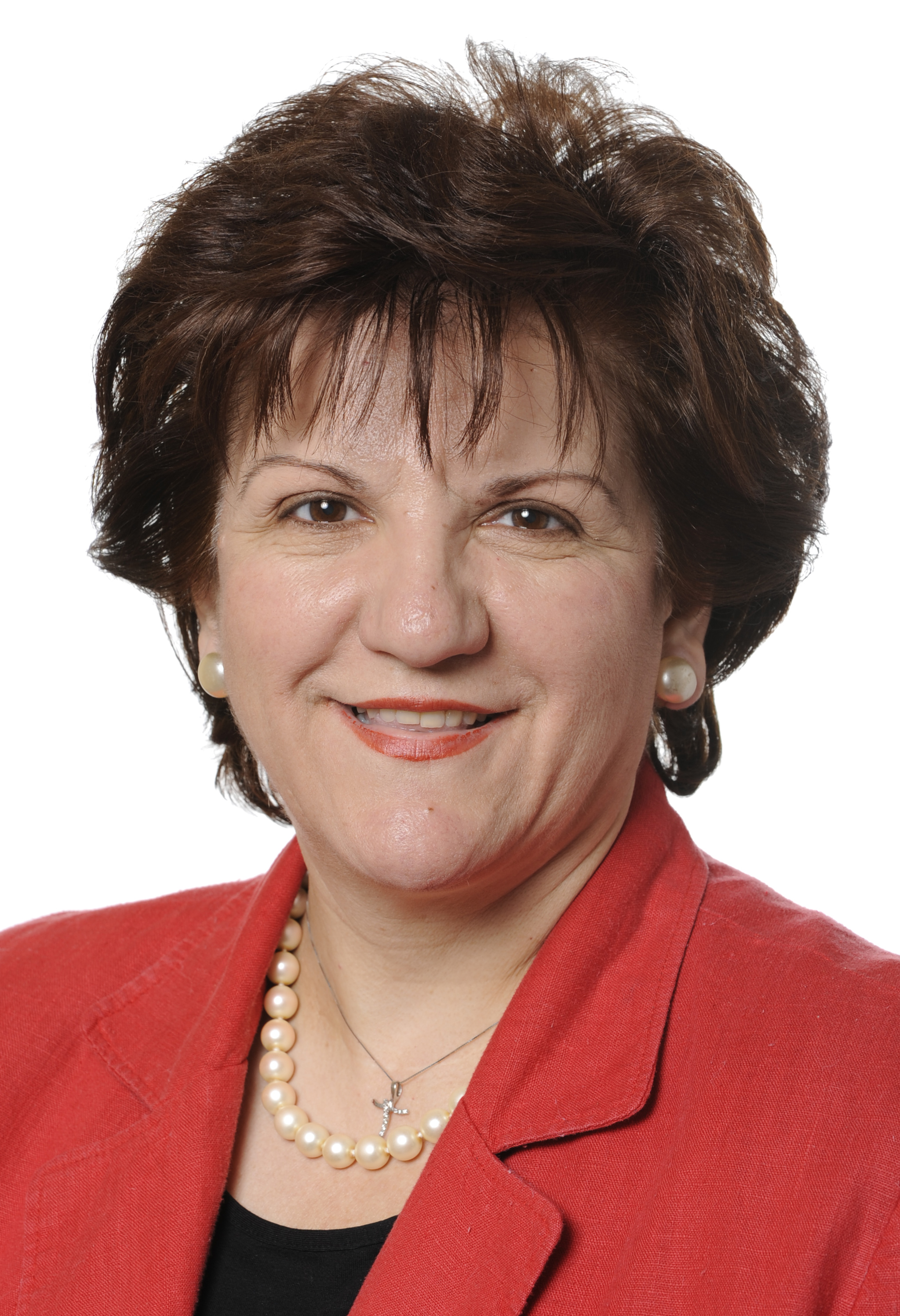

Member of the European Parliament
- In office July, 2009 – June, 2014

Parliamentary Assembly of the Council of Europe
- In office June 2001 – July, 2009

Member of the House of Representatives of Cyprus
- In office May, 2001 – July 2009

Mayor of Morphou
- In office December, 1996 – May 2001
- Preceded by: Andys Pantelides
- Succeeded by: Charalambos Pittas

President of GODIK (Women's Organization of DIKO )
- Incumbent
- Assumed office 1994
- Preceded by: Mary Papadopoulou

Member of the Municipal Council of Strovolos
- In office December, 1991 – December 1996

Personal details
- Born: Antigoni Pericleous; July 8, 1954 (age 72) Morphou, Cyprus
- Party: DIKO in Cyprus; S&D in the European Parliament
- Spouse: Stelios Papadopoulos (m. 1979)
- Children: 2
- Education: Russel Sage College (Chemistry); Lancaster University (BSc in Chemistry); Mediterranean Institute of Management (Postgraduate Studies in Management); University of the Aegean (Postgraduate degree in Gender Studies)
- Occupation: Politician, chemist
- Website: http://www.antigonipapadopoulou.com

Antigoni Papadopoulou (Greek: Αντιγόνη Παπαδοπούλου; née Pericleous (Greek: Περικλέους); born July 8, 1954) is a Greek Cypriot politician and chemist. She was one of the first two Cypriot women to be elected as Members of the European Parliament (MEPs) among six Cypriot MEPs (2009). She is a former Member of the House of Representatives of the Republic of Cyprus and the First Woman to serve as Chair of the House's Committee of Economic Affairs and Budgeting (2006–2009). She was an Assembly Member of the Council of Europe from 2001 to 2009 and has also served as Vice Chairperson of the Committee of Economic Affairs of the Parliamentary Assembly of the Council of Europe (2003–2009).

Papadopoulou was the elected Mayor of Morphou from 1996 to 2001. She was the first female mayor in the city's history and the only elected female mayor of Morphou so far, as well as the first woman to serve as a national parliamentarian in the District of Nicosia for the Democratic Party (DIKO) for two consecutive terms (2001 & 2006). She has also served as Municipal Councilor in Strovolos Municipality from 1991 to 1996. She is the President of GODIK, the Women's Organization of the Democratic Party since 1994.

== Personal life ==
Papadopoulou was born in Morphou. She has two younger brothers, Peter and Xenios. Her father, Andreas Pericleous, and her mother, Georgia Pericleous (née Thrasivoulou), originate from Petra, Kythrea, and Voni villages, all occupied by Turkish Cypriot forces since 1974, as is Morphou.

During her early school years, she attended the Elementary School and the First Gymnasium of Morphou (Science Section). She then studied chemistry at Russell Sage College as a Fulbright Scholar. She continued her academic studies at Lancaster University, first as a Junior Year Abroad (JYA) student, having been selected for the JYA exchange program between the University of Colorado and the University of Lancaster. She continued as a fourth year undergraduate student, having been granted a scholarship by Lancaster University and the British Council.

Papadopoulou obtained her Bachelor of Science in chemistry from Lancaster University in 1977. She then enrolled in the postgraduate diploma program in Management at the Mediterranean Institute of Management (1977–1978) and obtained the relevant diploma with distinction. In 1993, while following a professional career in chemistry, she passed the entrance examinations for the University of Athens to study Greek literature and attended the relevant courses for two academic years. More recently (2007–2009), she followed a post-graduate course of studies at the University of the Aegean (Greece), in Gender studies. She is fluent in Greek and English.

In September 1979, Papadopoulou married economist Dr. Stelios Papadopoulos, and later gave birth to two sons, Charis (age 45) and Andreas (age 42).

Papadopoulou enjoys painting, writing, and poetry. She had her first individual painting exhibition in 2006.

== Business career ==
Throughout her undergraduate studies she held occasional jobs as a teaching assistant at the Department of Chemistry at Russell Sage College, Troy, New York. She also took other occasional jobs during summer vacations. After the completion of her studies in chemistry, she worked for almost a year at Francoudi & Stephanou Shipping Company (Limassol) as management Trainee, attending at the same time the MIM post Graduate Management Program. She was then employed for almost a year as a Quality Control Manager at Vitatrace Nutrition, a local firm manufacturing premixes for animal feedstuffs. She was next employed at the Cyprus Carlsberg Brewery, as a Quality Control Manager, where she had a successful career for almost 23 years (1978–2001). Under this capacity she was responsible for running the Quality Control Department and carrying out the chemical, microbiological and packaging laboratory control of raw materials, semi-finished and final products of the Brewery, as well as table water, fruit juices and other products manufactured by the company.

== Political career ==
Throughout her schooling and early years Antigoni Papadopoulou was very active in politics.

=== President of GODIK (Women's Organization of DIKO) ===
In 1978, she became a member of GODIK and served as member of its local and district branches, for Nicosia and occupied Morphou. In 1994 she contested successfully the leadership of GODIK, a post that she holds until today. She is also a Member of the Democratic Party’s Central Committee and the Executive Bureau, since 1994. She has also served as Vice president of DIKO as well as coordinator of the Party's Political Research Groups (1998–2000).

=== |Member of the Municipal Council of Strovolos ===
In the municipality elections of December 1991, Papadopoulou successfully contested a seat as Councilor for the Municipality of Strovolos, where she lives, after becoming a refugee in 1974. As a Municipality Councilor she held the Chair of the Committee for the Environment and was actively involved in the Committee of Social Protection, working with relevant NGO’s on social issues/programs (1991–1996).

=== Member of the House of Representatives of Cyprus ===
In May 1996, she ran for the first time as a candidate of the Democratic Party in the parliamentary elections for Nicosia District, where she was first runner-up and failed to be elected by a very narrow margin of 44 votes. At the parliamentary elections of 27 May 2001, she was elected for the first time as Member of the Cypriot House of Representatives, standing as a DIKO candidate in Nicosia, and served as Member of the Parliamentary Standing Committees for Internal Affairs, Employment, Education, the Environment, Refugees-Enclaved-Missing Persons and Vice-Chair of the Parliamentary Committee on European Affairs; she was re-elected at the Parliamentary elections of 21 May 2006 and became the Chair of the House Standing Committee on Economic and Budgetary Affairs and member of the Parliamentary Committees of Education, Gender Equality and Refugees-Enclaved–Missing Persons.

=== Mayor of Morphou ===
In December 1996, in the municipal elections, Papadopoulou ran for Mayor of Morphou. She was elected as the first female mayor in the city's political history, defeating her opponent Andreas Shittis. She received 84% of the popular vote, as a common candidate of an alliance of four political parties. As mayor, she worked very hard on enlightenment campaigns on the Cyprus issue abroad and for the inalienable right of the refugees of Morphou to return to their occupied home-town. She also worked very hard for twinning Morphou with the towns of Żurrieq (Malta), Saint Syr Sur Loire (France) and Nea Orestiada (Greece); for editing and publishing the monthly Municipal magazine “Voice of Morphou and the occupied villages of the Morphou area”; for publishing the book “Morphou-3600 years of History”; for housing the Municipality's offices in the “House of Morphou” (Zenonos street 16, Nicosia) and for organizing an annual festival in commemoration of the annual orange festival held in Morphou, before 1974. As mayor, Papadopoulou was appointed as representative of the Cyprus Union of Municipalities in the Committee on Youth of the Council of Europe (1996–2001);

=== Parliamentary Assembly of the Council of Europe ===
From June 2001 until June 2009, she was the only female member in the Cyprus Delegation in the Parliamentary Assembly of the Council of Europe (PACE). She served as Vice Chair of the PACE Committee on Economic Affairs and Development. She was also a Member of the Committee on Equal Opportunities for Men and Women and the Committee on Culture, Science and Education and of the Sub-Committees on Equal Participation of Women and Men in Decision-Making, on International Economic Relations, on the Cultural Heritage, on Tourism Development, on Violence Against Women and on Youth and Sport.

=== Member of the European Parliament ===
She was elected as Member of the European Parliament in June 2009 and she joined the Political Group of the Progressive Alliance of Socialists and Democrats. Papadopoulou is a Member of the Committee on Civil Liberties, Justice and Home Affairs and Member of the Parliament's Delegation to the EU-Turkey Joint Parliamentary Committee. She is also a Substitute member of the Committee on Employment and Social Affairs, the Committee on Women's Rights and Gender Equality and the Delegation for Relations with Switzerland, Iceland, Norway and the European Economic Area (EEA). During her term she has been active on various issues including the economic situation in Europe and in particular the countries of the European South (Spain, Portugal, Greece, Cyprus), as well as health issues and culture. She is a nominee for the MEP Awards 2014 in the category "health".

== Awards and honours ==
She was appointed as a member of the Council of the Cyprus Olive Products Marketing Board and as member of the Cyprus Chemists' Registration Council.

== Publications ==
Antigoni Papadopoulou has published the books:

- 'Facing the Attila Barbed Wire' (1996)
- 'Woman ... the other half of heaven' (2006)

and has edited the book “Morphou, 3 600 years of history” and the magazine “The voice of Morphou and the occupied villages of the Morphou plain”. She has also published many articles of a political and social context in the daily and periodical press.

== Hobbies & Interests ==
Painting, writing and poetry. First individual painting exhibition (2006).

== See also ==
- Members of the European Parliament for Cyprus 2009–2014
- Progressive Alliance of Socialists and Democrats
