= Pano Akourdaleia =

Pano Akourdaleia Πάνω Ακουρδάλεια
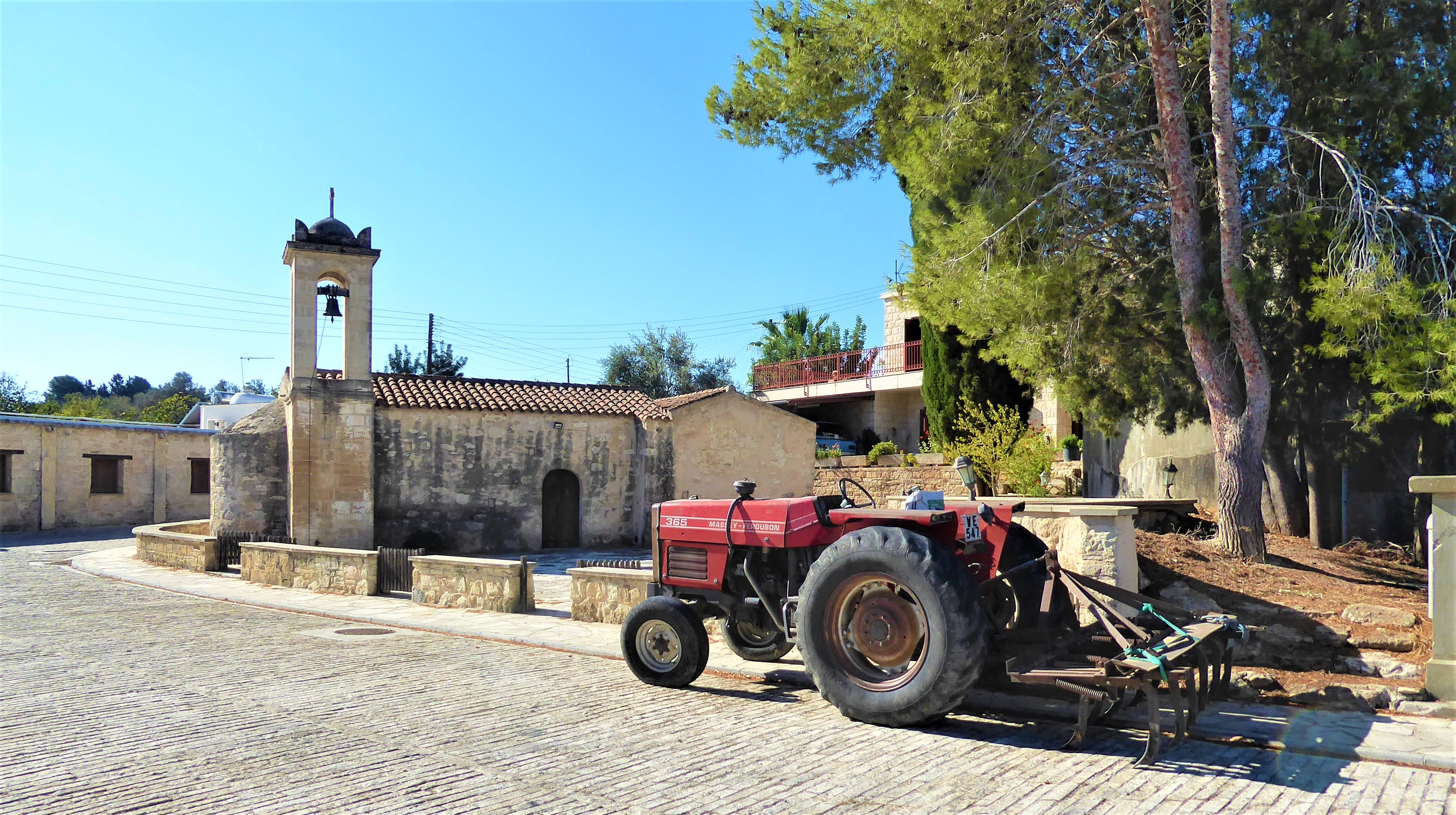

- Location in Cyprus
- Coordinates: 34°57′10″N 32°27′6″E
- Country: Cyprus
- District: Paphos District
- Elevation: 1,460 ft (445 m)

Population (2001)
  - Total: 26
- Time zone: UTC+2 (EET)
  - Summer (DST): UTC+3 (EEST)
- Postal code: 6332

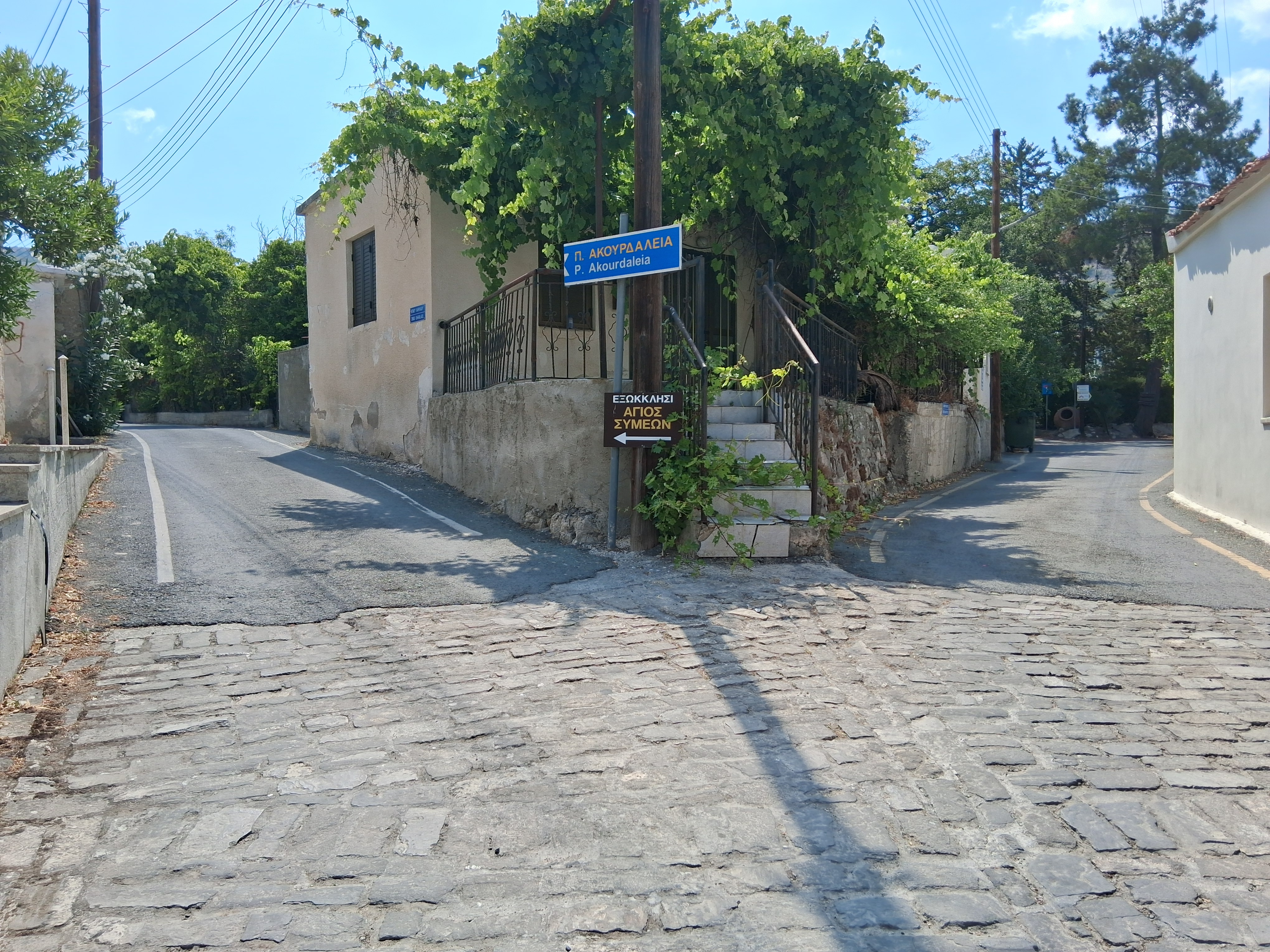
Sign in the town of Miliou pointing to Pano Akourdaleia

Pano Akourdaleia (Greek: Πάνω Ακουρδάλεια) is a village in the Paphos District of Cyprus, located 2 km west of Miliou. The village is the birthplace of Cypriot politician and Euro-MP Takis Hadjigeorgiou.

The village has been in existence for more than a thousand years. According to maps dating back to the Venetian times and even earlier, the village was referred to as Quardia (the term also means Garrison/Guard). Other early records suggest that the name of the village may also trace its origin to a Lusignan army battalion. Nearchos Klerides, who researched extensively the origins of names of the villages and towns of Cyprus, argued that the name of the village came from the word "cord", which means "string" or a special "belt" that the villagers or the members of the Lusignan battalion wore around their waist. Most probably, the name/term Akourdaleia or H Aκουρδάλεια as it is called in Greek is derived from the French à Cœur de Lion.

The village has two small churches, namely the Church of Ayia Paraskevi which dates its origin back to the 12th century, tacked just outside the village in a location where a mill once stood. The remains of the mill are still there. The second Church is that of Panayia Chryseleousa, located in the main village that dates its origin as back as the 16th century.

According to a population census conducted by the Venetians around 1450, the village under the name Pano Akourdaleia had 85 inhabitants who paid taxes. The census did not include women and children.

Numerous vaulted graves and archaeological specimens (including a sarcophagus, amphorae and many more funeral gifts) dating form the pre-Christian era have been discovered in the village.

While in the beginning of 1960 Pano Akourdaleia numbered more than 150 inhabitants, today their number shrank to that of 30 inhabitants many of whom are foreign nationals, mostly coming from the United Kingdom and Ireland, who have settled in the village.

Through a modern transportation network Pano Akourdaleia is linked with various villages in the area. In the northern part, just three kilometres away is the village of Kathikas while the villages of Kato Akourdaleia and Miliou are located just a few minutes away.

Pano Akourdaleia has an environment with many species of flora. As such the village is frequently visited by nature to explore the nature trails/paths that exist there.
