= Merchandising =

Promotion of product sales

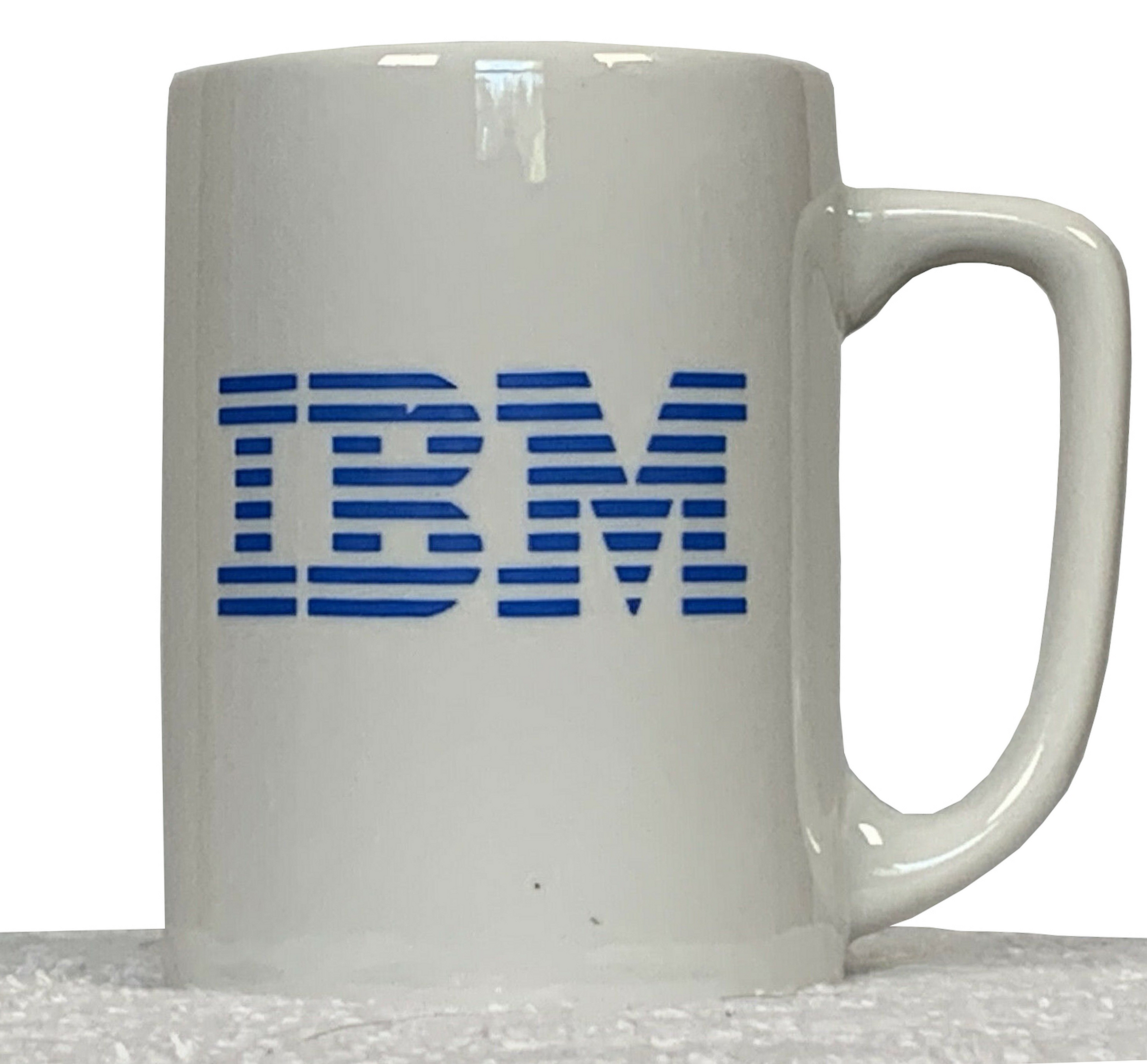
Coffee mugs are a classical merchandising item employed by entities ranging from very small businesses to multinational companies like IBM, and also musical groups.

Merchandising is the process of contributing to the sale of products to a retail consumer by displaying for-sale products in ways that enticed to purchase more items or products.

== Terminology and scope ==
The term merchandising encompasses a range of practices used to present and promote products as they move toward consumers. In physical retail environments, it refers to decisions regarding the arrangement, pricing, packaging, and visual display of goods in a store. The word is also used to describe promotional items bearing a company's name or logo such as shirts, mugs, or small giveaways.

A more formal usage appears in licensed merchandising, in which characters, trademarks, or other forms of intellectual property are placed on commercial products under contractual agreements. With the expansion of e-commerce, the term also includes the ways products are displayed online, from image presentation to search and recommendation systems that assist customers in locating items without a physical shelf.

== History ==
The principles of merchandising began to take shape in the 19th century, with the transition from small shops to wider sales areas and the emergence of modern supermarkets. Department stores in Europe and in the United States began to use designed display windows, conscious planning of the customers' movement in the store, and deliberately arranged shelves to attract buyers and emphasize products. These processes are considered the turning point in which the design and layout of the store changed from merchants' intuition into a systematic tool for increasing sales.

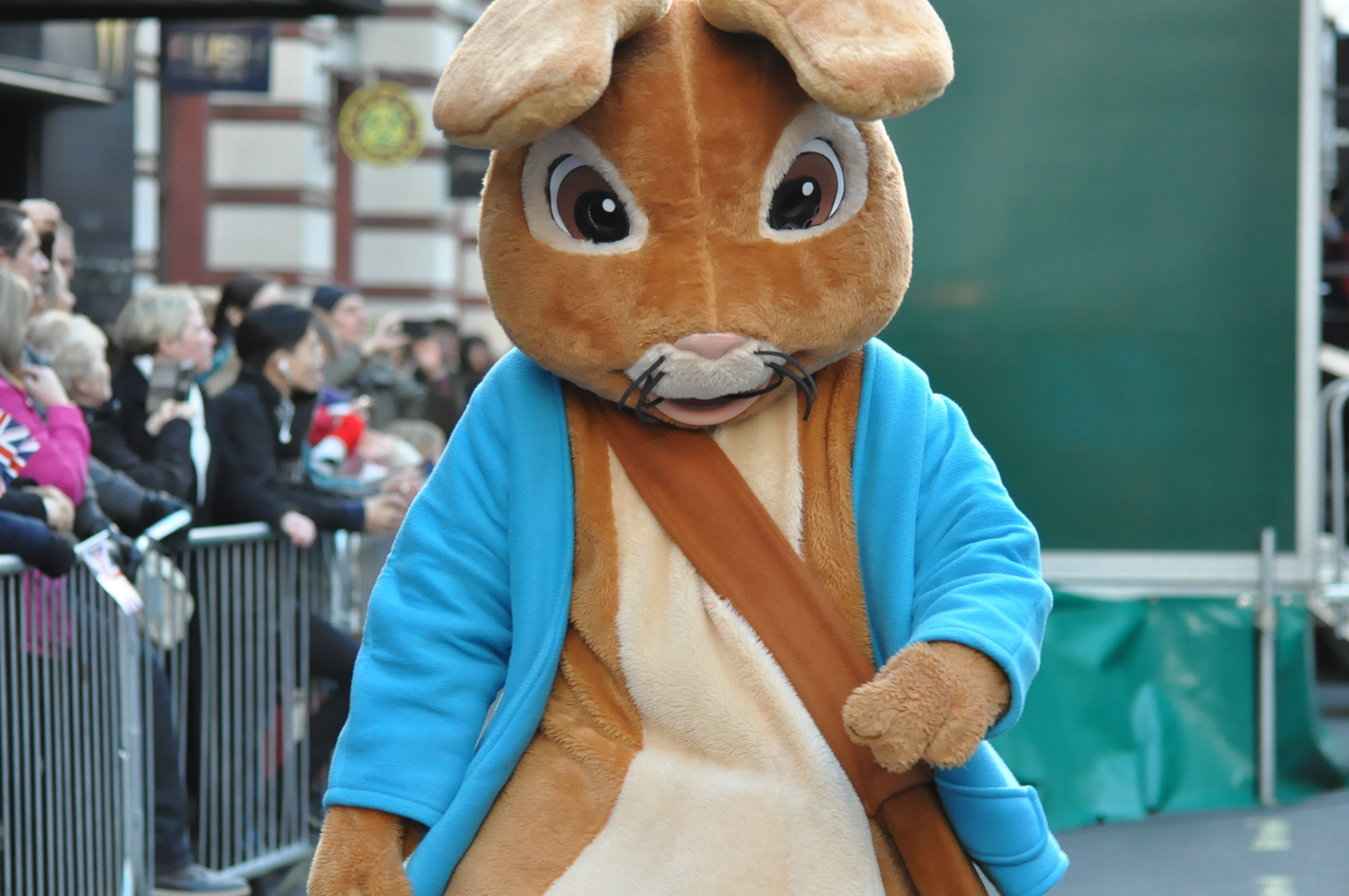
A Peter Rabbit mascot costume.

During the 20th century, with the spread of retail chains and self-service stores, merchandising developed into a recognized and studied field. Retailers began to systematically plan the variety of products (breadth and colors), inventory levels, pricing, and allocation of shelf space to convert customer movement into sales.

In the research of the field, merchandising is described as the overall strategy that integrates the selection and arrangement of products, the design of the store and its shelves, promotions, and signage in both physical stores and e-commerce.

A parallel branch of merchandising developed around cultural figures and symbols. At the beginning of the 20th century, author Beatrix Potter registered a patent for the Peter Rabbit doll, which is considered one of the first cases of a literary character being distributed as a consumer product, accompanied by a line of toys, household items, and collectables. Later in the century, Walt Disney studios developed a structured business model for "character merchandising," licensing characters and distributing them on toys, clothing, and accompanying products, which influenced the cinema, television, and sports industries throughout the world.

== Promotional merchandising ==
The annual cycle of merchandising differs between countries and even within them, particularly relating to cultural customs like holidays, and seasonal issues like climate and local sporting and recreation. Events such as Chinese festivals and Japanese festivals are incorporated in an annual cycle of shop decorations and merchandise promotion.

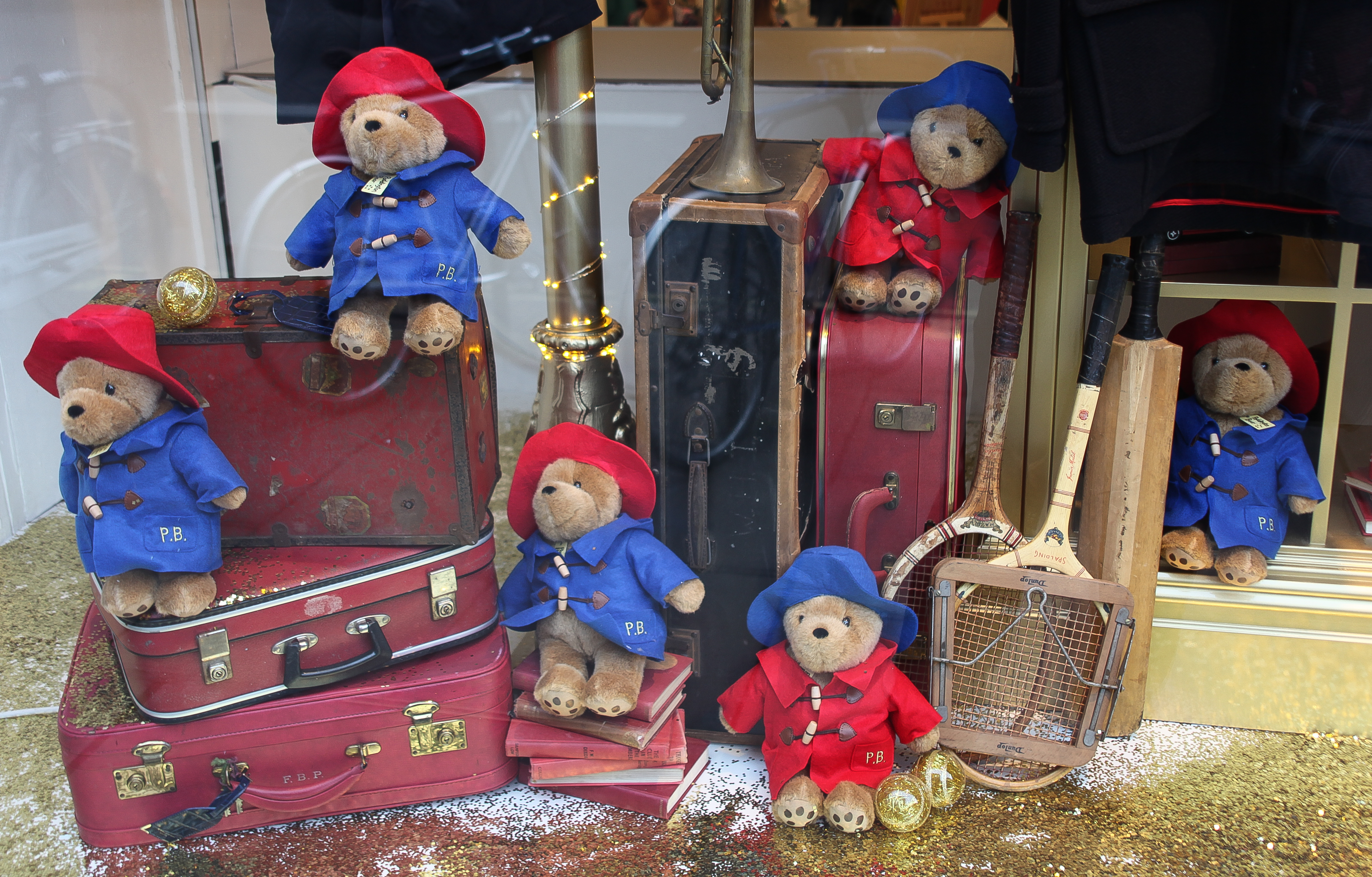
Christmas shopwindow at Selfridges department store in London with a Paddington Bear theme to mark the release of the 2014 film Paddington

As just one example, in the United States the basic retail cycle begins in early January with merchandise for Valentine's Day, which is not until mid-February. Presidents' Day sales are held shortly thereafter. Following this, Easter is the major holiday, while springtime clothing and garden-related merchandise is already arriving at stores, often as early as mid-winter (toward the beginning of this section, St. Patrick's Day merchandise, including green items and products pertaining to Irish culture, is also promoted). Mother's Day and Father's Day are next, with graduation gifts (typically small consumer electronics like digital cameras) often being marketed as "dads and grads" in June (though most college semesters end in May; the grads portion usually refers to high school graduation, which occurs one to two weeks after Father's Day in many U.S. states). Summer merchandise is next, including patriotic-themed products with the American flag, placed on the market by Memorial Day in preparation for Independence Day (with Flag Day in between). By July, back-to-school is on the shelves and autumn merchandise is already arriving, and at some arts and crafts stores, Christmas decorations. (Often, a Christmas in July celebration is held around this time.) The back-to-school market is promoted heavily in August, when there are no holidays to promote. By September, particularly after Labor Day, summer merchandise is on final closeout and overstock of school supplies is marked-down some as well, and Halloween (and often even more of the Christmas) merchandise is appearing. As the Halloween decorations and costumes dwindle in October, Christmas is already being pushed on consumers, and by the day after Halloween retailers are going full-force with advertising, even though the "official" season does not start until the day after Thanksgiving. Christmas clearance sales begin even before Christmas at many retailers, though others begin on the day after Christmas and continue on at least until New Year's Day but sometimes as far out as February.

The trend of stocking stores with merchandise many weeks prior to the actual event targeted and the period of consumption can be described by the term advance selling. Although it may seem disadvantageous for sellers, advance selling can have the opposite effect. For example, this practice works to counteract a lack of abundant capacity in stores during prime seasons and a lack of value in premature products.

Merchandising also varies within retail chains, where stores in places like Buffalo might carry snow blowers, while stores in Florida and southern California might instead carry beach clothing and barbecue grills all year. Coastal-area stores might carry water skiing equipment, while ones near mountain ranges would likely have snow skiing and snowboarding gear if there are ski areas nearby.

=== Silent persuasion ===
As promotional merchandise acquires a larger portion of companies' annual budgets, its appearance in the hands of unintended recipients increases. However, this has been found to generate a positive outcome for companies without any additional effort after producing the merchandise because of the concept of silent persuasion. The concept theorizes that even without the acknowledgement of the brand being promoted on the merchandise, the individual using it is affected in their future actions as a consumer. Furthermore, a 2019 study found that the tactile usage of the products produced a greater response in consumers than a solely visual interaction with a product such as posters. This study concluded that considering allotting a greater sum of money to smaller pieces of merchandising that promote a brand would benefit newer companies that have yet to become quickly recognizable.

== Retail supply chain ==
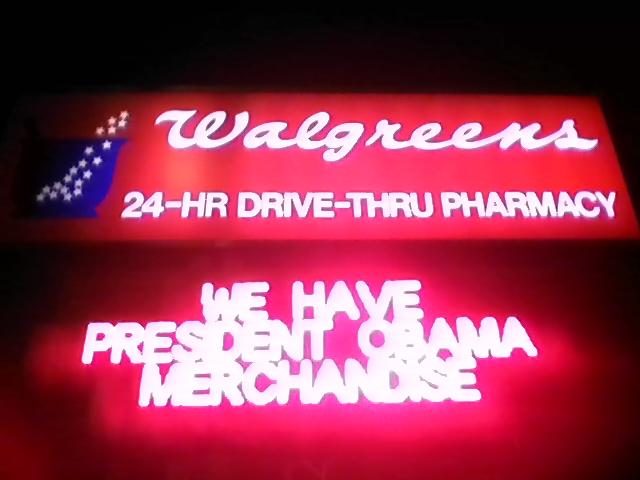
Merchandising at a Walgreens in Chicago

In the supply chain, merchandising is the practice of making products in retail outlets available to consumers, primarily by stocking shelves and displays. While this used to be done exclusively by the stores' employees, many retailers have found substantial savings in requiring it to be done by the manufacturer, vendor, or wholesaler that provides the products to the retail store. In the United Kingdom, there are a number of organizations that supply merchandising services to support retail outlets with general stock replenishment and merchandising support in new stores. By doing this, retail stores have been able to substantially reduce the number of employees needed to run the store.

While stocking shelves and building displays is often done when the product is delivered, it is increasingly a separate activity from delivering the product. In grocery stores, for example, almost all products delivered directly to the store from a manufacturer or wholesaler will be stocked by the manufacturer's/wholesaler's employee who is a full-time merchandiser. Product categories where this is common are Beverage (all types, alcoholic and non-alcoholic), packaged baked goods (bread and pastries), magazines and books, and health and beauty products. For major food manufacturers in the beverage and baked goods industries, their merchandisers are often the single largest employee group within the company. For nationwide branded goods manufacturers such as The Coca-Cola Company and PepsiCo, their respective merchandiser work forces number in the thousands.

== Online merchandising ==
A challenge that online retailers face in comparison to the traditional in-store shopping experience is the sensory exploration that isn't available to consumers through a screen. An area this is especially prevalent in is clothing or fashion retail in which potential sizing issues can be a large factor in a customer refraining from purchasing an item online. Moreover, accurately portraying the texture and quality of a product in all areas of retail, not limited to fashion, remains a challenge in the field of online merchandising as the lack thereof has been proven to result in more indecision for consumers. Because of this, many companies look for ways to improve their online shopping options to make browsing merchandise as similar to an in-store experience as possible while keeping up with the growing online market.

== Channel merchandising ==
This concept can be linked to marketing channels which bring products from the possession of the producer into the possession of the consumer. In recent decades, these methods used by companies to provide merchandise have expanded from in-person only, to online-only for some stores during the COVID-19 pandemic, to a mixture of both, sometimes referred to as omnichannel retailing. The combination of both options for consumers provides a favorable encounter with retailers that makes them more likely to purchase products and return to the seller again at a future date. However, these strategies can be difficult for sellers to maintain as it can require many more physical and technical resources that may not be currently available to them.

== Licensing ==
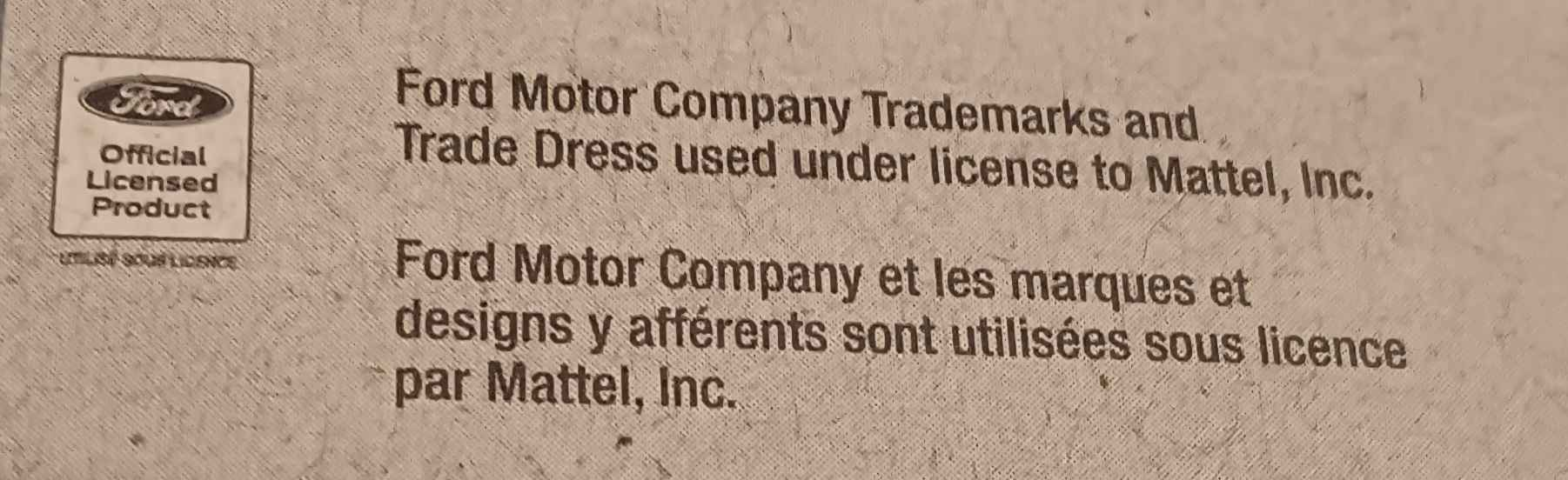
A merchandise licensing disclaimer printed on the back of Hot Wheels packaging

In marketing, one of the definitions of merchandising is the practice in which the brand or image from one product or service is used to sell another. Trademarked brand names, logos, or character images are licensed to manufacturers of products such as toys or clothing, which then make items in or emblazoned with the image of the license, hoping they'll sell better than the same item with no such image. For the owners of the IP (intellectual property) in question, merchandising is a very popular source of revenue, due to the low cost of letting a third party manufacture the merchandise, while the IP owners collect the merchandising (royalty) fees.

In 1903, a year after publishing The Tale of Peter Rabbit, English author Beatrix Potter created the first Peter Rabbit soft toy and registered him at the Patent Office in London, making Peter the oldest licensed fictional character. Erica Wagner of The Times states, "Beatrix Potter was the first to recognise that content—as we now call the stuff that makes up a book or a film—was only the beginning. In 1903, Peter hopped outside his pages to become a patented soft toy, which gave him the distinction of being not only Mr. McGregor‘s mortal enemy, but also becoming the first licensed character".

== Children ==
Merchandising for children is most prominently seen in connection with films and videogames, usually those in current release and with television shows oriented towards children.

Merchandising, especially in connection with child-oriented films, TV shows and literature, often consists of toys made in the likeness of the show or book's characters (action figures) or items which they use. This was first seen with the Peter Rabbit soft toy in 1903, with the Smithsonian magazine stating Beatrix Potter "created a system that continues to benefit all licensed characters, from Mickey Mouse to Harry Potter." However, sometimes it can be the other way around, with the show written to include the toys, as advertising for the merchandise.

Sometimes merchandising from a television show can grow far beyond the original show, even lasting decades after the show has largely disappeared from popularity.

== Adult ==
The most common adult-oriented merchandising is that related to professional sports teams (and their players).

A smaller niche in merchandising is the marketing of more adult-oriented products in connection with similarly adult-oriented films and TV shows. This is common especially with the science fiction and horror genres. Occasionally, shows which were intended more for children find a following among adults (for example, Gundam model kits). An early example of this phenomenon was the cartoon character Little Lulu, who became licensed to products for adults, such as Kleenex facial tissue.

Sometimes a brand of non-media products can achieve enough recognition and respect that simply putting its name or images on a completely unrelated item can sell that item. An example is Harley-Davidson branded clothing.

=== Idol goods ===
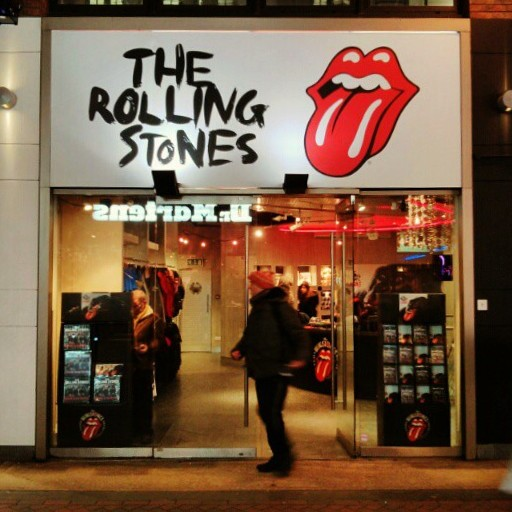
Rolling Stones merchandise for sale on Carnaby Street, London

Idol goods or idol merchandise are various types of merchandise related to celebrities ("idols"). Consumption of idol goods is a significant part of the idol fandom. Such goods create and reinforce a more physical connection between fans and celebrities.

Examples of common idol goods include stationery items, compact discs, photo albums, calendars, telephone cards, T-shirts (see also concert T-shirt), key chains, lapel pins, and various other goods. Virtual idols can be considered an idol good themselves as they can be bought and sold. An idol can have a tremendous effect on sales of merchandise, an example being David Beckham upon his arrival at Real Madrid in 2003, with an Adidas spokesman stating, "Put Beckham's name on any product and Real Madrid didn't stop selling".

In the 1960s the Beatles were pioneers in conventional retailing in music, setting up their own retail store in London, Apple Boutique, that sold Beatles merchandise.

== See also ==
- Celebrity branding – Form of advertising campaign or marketing strategy
- Merchandization
- Visual merchandising – Marketing technique emphasizing 3D model displays
- Gadget – Small mechanical device
- Tie-in – Work of fiction
- Shoplifting – Theft of goods from a retail establishment
- List of highest-grossing media franchises
