= List of members of the European Parliament for Estonia, 2009–2014 =

This is the list of the 6 members of the European Parliament for Estonia in the 2009 to 2014 session.

== List ==
Name	National party	EP Group
Tunne Kelam	Pro Patria and Res Publica Union	EPP
Kristiina Ojuland	Reform Party (2009–2013); Independent	ALDE
Siiri Oviir	Centre Party (2009–2012); Independent	ALDE
Ivari Padar	Social Democratic Party	S&D
Vilja Savisaar-Toomast	Centre Party (2009–2012); Reform Party (since 2013)	ALDE
Indrek Tarand	Independent	G–EFA

=== Party representation ===
National party	EP Group	Seats	±
Centre Party	ALDE	2 / 6	▲1
Indrek Tarand (Independent)	G–EFA	1 / 6	▲1
Reform Party	ALDE	1 / 6	Steady
Pro Patria and Res Publica Union	EPP	1 / 6	Steady
Social Democratic Party	S&D	1 / 6	▼2
