= List of members of the European Parliament for Portugal, 2009–2014 =

This is a list of the 22 members of the European Parliament for Portugal in the 2009 to 2014 session.

== List ==
Name	National party	EP Group
Paulo Rangel	Social Democratic Party	EPP
Carlos Coelho	Social Democratic Party	EPP
Graça Carvalho	Social Democratic Party	EPP
Mário David	Social Democratic Party	EPP
Nuno Teixeira	Social Democratic Party	EPP
Maria do Céu Patrão	Social Democratic Party	EPP
Regina Bastos	Social Democratic Party	EPP
José Manuel Fernandes	Social Democratic Party	EPP
Vital Moreira	Socialist Party	S&D
Edite Estrela	Socialist Party	S&D
Luís Capoulas Santos	Socialist Party	S&D
Elisa Ferreira	Socialist Party	S&D
António Correia de Campos	Socialist Party	S&D
Luís Paulo Alves	Socialist Party	S&D
Ana Gomes	Socialist Party	S&D
Miguel Portas (2009–2012)	Left Bloc	EUL–NGL
Marisa Matias	Left Bloc	EUL–NGL
Rui Tavares	Left Bloc (2009–2011); Independent (2011–2014); LIVRE (2014)	EUL–NGL (2009–2011); G/EFA (2011–2014)
Alda Sousa (2012–2014)	Left Bloc	EUL–NGL
Ilda Figueiredo (2009–2012)	Portuguese Communist Party	EUL–NGL
João Ferreira	Portuguese Communist Party	EUL–NGL
Inês Zuber (2012–2014)	Portuguese Communist Party	EUL–NGL
Nuno Melo	CDS – People's Party	EPP
Diogo Feio	CDS – People's Party	EPP
