= Alternatiba, Village of Alternatives =

French social movement fighting climate change

Alternatiba, Village of Alternatives (in French) Alternatiba, village des alternatives
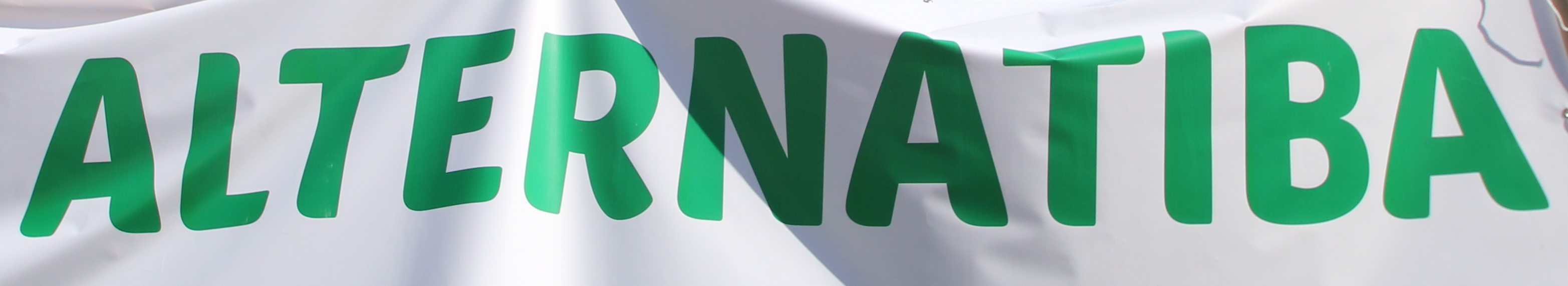

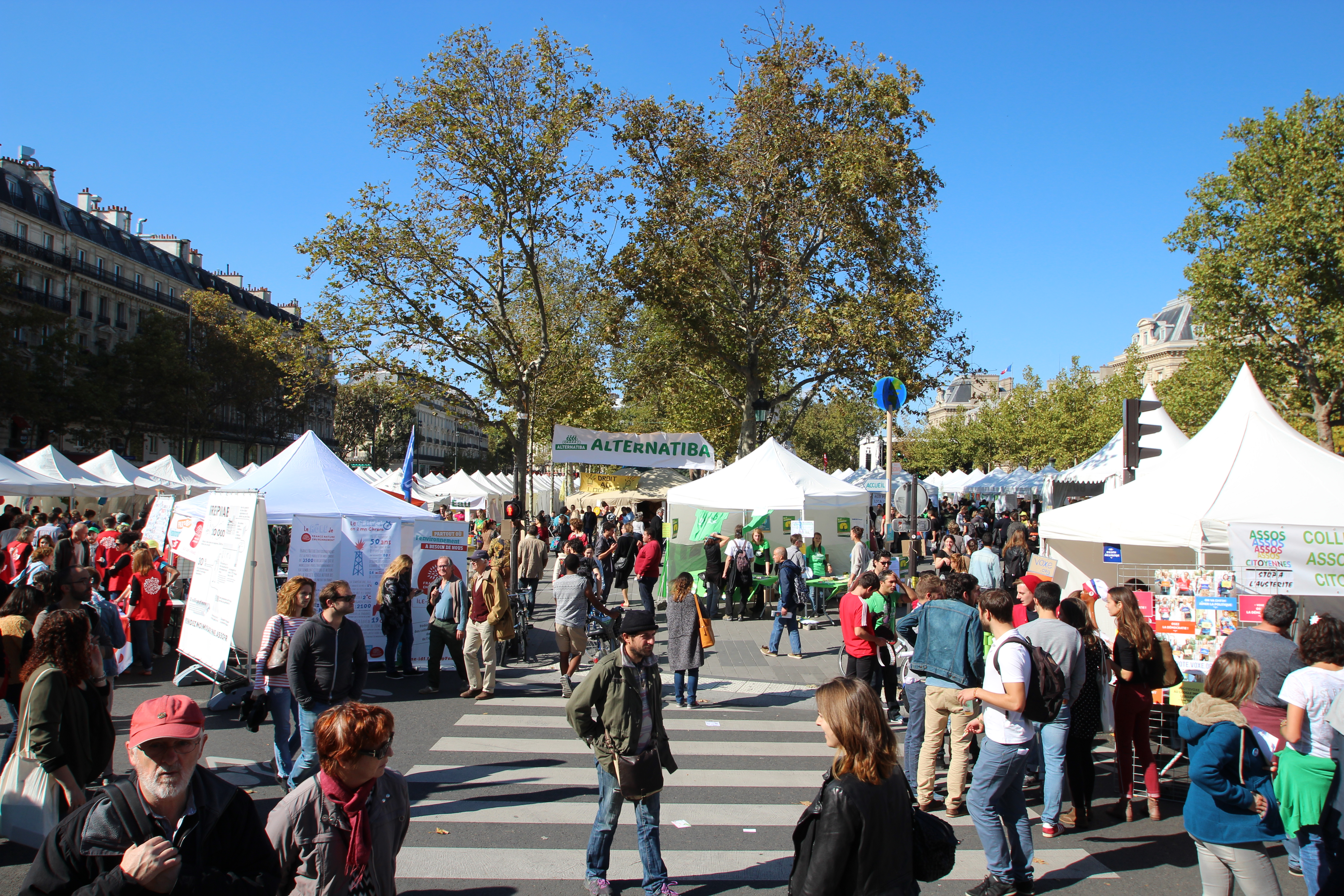
- Alternatiba event in Paris (2015).
- Status: Active
- Frequency: Annually
- Location: Multiples cities
- Country: International (mostly in Europe)
- Years active: 13
- Inaugurated: 5 October 2013
- Major events: Mobilise society to face the challenges of climate change
- Patrons: Stéphane Hessel and Christiane Hessel
- Website: alternatiba.eu

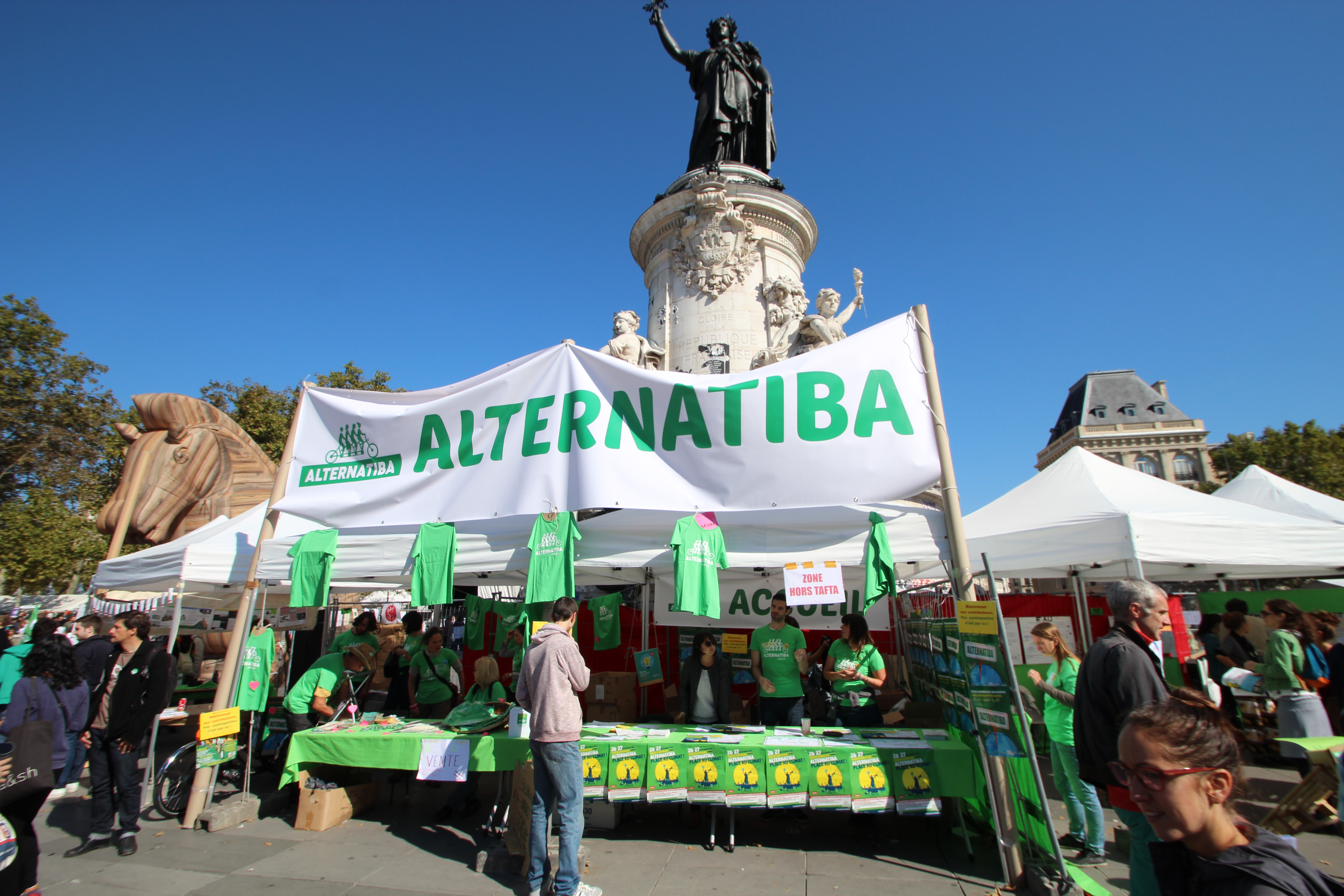
Alternatiba event in Paris, before the 2015 United Nations Climate Change Conference.

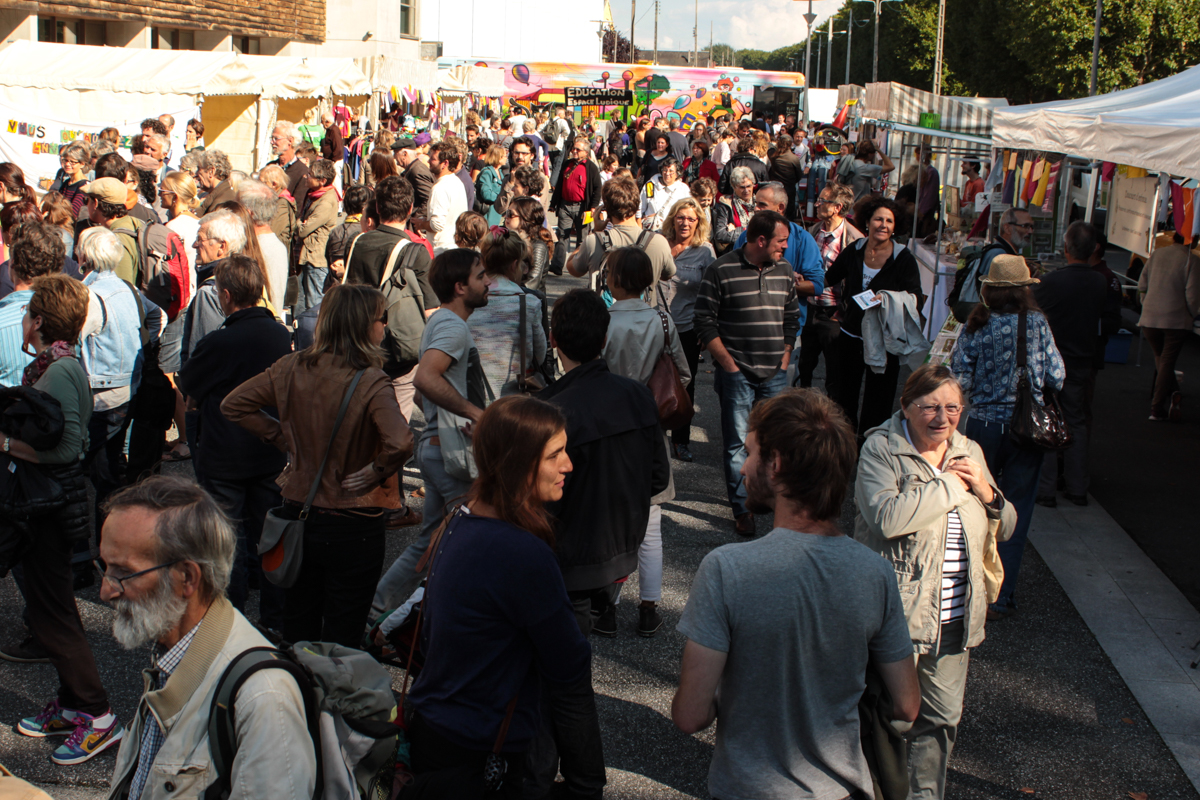
Alternatiba in Caen.

Alternatiba (« Alternative », in Basque language) is a framework to mobilise society to face the challenges of climate change. Numerous Alternatiba events, which provide hundreds of alternatives in order to raise people's awareness and to stimulate behaviour change, have been or will be organised in over sixty different French and European cities.

Additionally, these initiatives aim to put pressure on politicians, especially before the 2015 United Nations Climate Change Conference in Paris (and the next United Nations Climate Change conferences).

== History ==
The first Alternatiba, village of Alternatives, took place in Bayonne on 5–6 October 2013. It was initiated by the Basque environmental organization Bizi!, and gathered over 12.000 people. Following the failure of the Copenhagen Summit in 2009, they felt it was time to show "European citizens that everything cannot be expected from political decisions at a higher level. We should start at the base, right where we live, with practical initiatives: eco-construction, short distribution chain, renewable energies, organic food, local money, etc. A list that should certainly not be restrictive in order to create a European citizen dynamic".

In a festive and friendly atmosphere, the visitors were able to discover that "solutions exist; they are already put into effect by thousands of associations, local communities and individuals. Even better: these alternatives contribute to a more pleasant society where solidarity, justice and people matter.”

The first village hosted 50 conferences and 15 thematic areas with workshops and stands, as well as a vast number of artistic and educational activities. Ninety organizations supported the event such as Friends of the Earth, Greenpeace, SUD solidaires, Attac, Biocoop, the Nicolas Hulot Foundation as well as a thousand volunteers" Stéphane Hessel became the sponsor of the event in 2012, followed by his wife Christiane Hessel after his death. She concluded the event with a speech calling for the construction of 10, 100, 1 000 Alternatibas all over the world.

On 22 February 2014, in Nantes, hundreds of people rallied for the first Alternatiba meeting on a European level. The initiators of the Bayonne Alternatiba presented the guidelines and emphasized the main principles. In the wake of this event, a European framework for Alternatiba was created.

A Charter describing the shared values and common principles of all the Alternatibas was defined on 6 October 2013 and then revised after successive debates of the Alternatiba committees.

During the summer of 2014, the Nantes Alternatiba committee proposed to create an "Alternatiba" anthem, recorded by a collective from Nantes with professional and amateur musicians.

== Method and tools ==
The organization of the different Alternatiba collective reflect the experience gained by Bizi ! Cross-sectoral commissions decide on the location of the event, liaise with local governments and manage the funds. Organization relies on the work of a large number of volunteers.

Thematic committees concentrate on the content of the event and the organization of the thematic areas. At almost every Alternatiba, a climate area is introduced as well as different thematic areas concerning the use of natural and energy resources such as transport, energy, agriculture, food, and also areas dedicated to alternative lifestyles and culture, education, solidarity, shared goods, sustainable development, the necessity of international environmental justice, for example.

=== Alternatiba Tour in 2015 ===
In 2015 the Alternatiba Tour crossed six European countries, using 3- or 4-person bikes and joined by other cyclists along the 5,000-km route. The aim of the Tour was to popularize the Alternatiba initiatives and to start mobilizing citizens on the climate. The tour ended in the Île-de-France region at the Paris Alternatiba on 26–27 September 2015.

=== Alternatiba Tour in 2018 ===
A second Alternatiba Tour launches on 9 June 2018 from Paris. The tour crosses 200 territories until the 6th of October, notably passing through Orléans, Lille, Brussels, Strasbourg, Lyon, Marseille, Toulouse and arriving at Bayonne.

The arrival celebrates the opening of the alternative village of Bayonne, which marks the five years of the citizen dynamics. This edition is sponsored by the sociologist and philosopher Edgar Morin and the Senegalese anthropologist Mariama Diallo. The village ends with the reading by two teenagers of a manifesto entitled "The time of hope and action".

== Previous Alternatibas ==
Alternatiba collectives have currently been established in more than sixty cities, most of them in France.

=== 2013 ===
- Bayonne – 5–6 October 2013 (first Alternatiba event)

=== 2014 ===
- Agen – 13 September 2014
- Valence d'Agen (Alternatome) - 3–4 May 2014
- Gonesse – 20–21 September 2014
- Paris Festival des Utopies Concrètes – 27–28 September 2014
- Nantes – 28 September 2014
- Lille – 4–5 October 2014
- Socoa – 5 October 2014
- Gironde – 10–12 October 2014
- Tahiti – 29–30 November 2014

=== 2015 ===
- Todmorden (England) – 3 May 2015
- Léribosc - L'Honor de Cos - 16–17 May 2015
- Givors - 30 May 2015
- Aber-Wrac'h - 5–7 June 2015
- Saint-Sébastien (Spain) - 5–6 June 2015
- Saint-Quentin-en-Yvelines – 6–7 June 2015
- Bagnères-de-Bigorre – 7 June 2015
- Gap - 7 June 2015
- Chambéry - 13 June 2015
- Nancy - 13–14 June 2015
- Puy-de-Dôme – 14 June 2015
- Narbonne - 16–17 June 2015
- Montpellier - 20 June 2015
- Île-Saint-Denis - 20 June 2015
- Martigues - 23 June 2015
- Dijon - 26–28 June 2015
- Béarn - 27–28 June 2, 2015
- Strasbourg - 27–28 June 2015
- Marseille - 27–28 June 2015
- Rennes – 27 June 2015
- Yonne – Joigny – 4 July 2015
- Nord-Essonne – 4–5 July 2015
- Mulhouse – 19 July 2015
- Geneva - 18–20 September 2015 (20,000 participants)
- Paris - 26–27 September 2015

=== 2016 ===
- Geneva (Plaine de Plainpalais) - 22–24 September 2016
