= List of members of the European Parliament for Cyprus, 2009–2014 =

This is a list of the 6 members of the European Parliament for Cyprus in the 2009 to 2014 session.

== List ==
Name	Photograph	National party	EP Group	Votes
Takis Hadjigeorgiou		Progressive Party of Working People	EUL–NGL	
Ioannis Kasoulidis		Democratic Rally	EPP	
Kyriakos Mavronikolas		Movement for Social Democracy	S&D	
Antigoni Papadopoulou		Democratic Party	S&D	
Eleni Theocharous		Democratic Rally	EPP	
Kyriacos Triantaphyllides		Progressive Party of Working People	EUL–NGL	

=== Party representation ===
National party	EP Group	Seats	±
Democratic Rally	EPP	2 / 6	Steady
Progressive Party of Working People	EUL–NGL	2 / 6	Steady
Democratic Party	S&D	1 / 6	Steady
Movement for Social Democracy	S&D	1 / 6	▲1
