= Socialist League (Finland) =

- Sosialistiliitto
- Type: Political organisation
- Region served: Finland
- Main organ: Murros; Antikapitalisti
- Affiliations: International Socialist Tendency

The Socialist League (Finnish: Sosialistiliitto) was a Trotskyist organisation in Finland. It was affiliated to the International Socialist Tendency. From 1995 until 1998 the organisation was known as Communist Youth (Kommunistinuoret).

At its founding the Communist Youth was close to the "new" Communist Party of Finland (SKP) but supporters of the SKP left the organisation after the name change. They founded Communist Youth League of Finland in 2000.

Flag of the Socialist League

The Socialist League published the magazines Murros and Antikapitalisti. The organisation was active in different left led protests.
