= List of members of the European Parliament for Luxembourg, 2009–2014 =

This is a list of the 6 members of the European Parliament for Luxembourg in the 2009 to 2014 session.

== List ==
Name	National party	EP Group	Votes
Georges Bach	Christian Social People's Party	EPP	11,401
Frank Engel	Christian Social People's Party	EPP	12,996
Robert Goebbels	Socialist Workers' Party	S&D	54,608
Charles Goerens	Democratic Party	LD	99,081
Astrid Lulling	Christian Social People's Party	EPP	28,970
Claude Turmes	The Greens	G–EFA	60,645

=== Party representation ===
National party	EP Group	Seats	±
Christian Social People's Party	EPP	3 / 6	Steady
Socialist Workers' Party	PES	1 / 6	Steady
Democratic Party	LD	1 / 6	Steady
The Greens	G	1 / 6	Steady
