= Voni =

Voni: Βώνη (Greek); Gökhan (Turkish)
- Village
- Location in Cyprus
- Coordinates: 35°13′54″N 33°29′39″E
- Country (de jure): Cyprus
  - District: Nicosia District
- Country (de facto): Northern Cyprus
  - District: Lefkoşa District

Population (2006)
  - Total: 229
- Time zone: UTC+2 (EET)
  - Summer (DST): UTC+3 (EEST)

Voni (Greek: Βώνη; Turkish: Gökhan) is a village in the Nicosia District of Cyprus, located just southeast of Kythrea. The village is under de facto control of Northern Cyprus.
