= Association for the Taxation of Financial Transactions and for Citizens' Action =

French tax advocacy group

- Association pour la Taxation des Transactions financières et pour l'Action Citoyenne
- Abbreviation: ATTAC / attac
- Founded: 3 June 1998; 28 years ago
- Type: Voluntary association
- Location: Paris, France
- Origins: A single-issue movement that was founded in France after Ignacio Ramonet published an editorial in Le Monde diplomatique that read « Disarm the markets ». Supporters founded an association to promote the Tobin tax.
- Region served: Worldwide
- Method: Popular education, meetings, conferences, counter-arguments documents
- Members: 90,000
- Website: www.attac.org

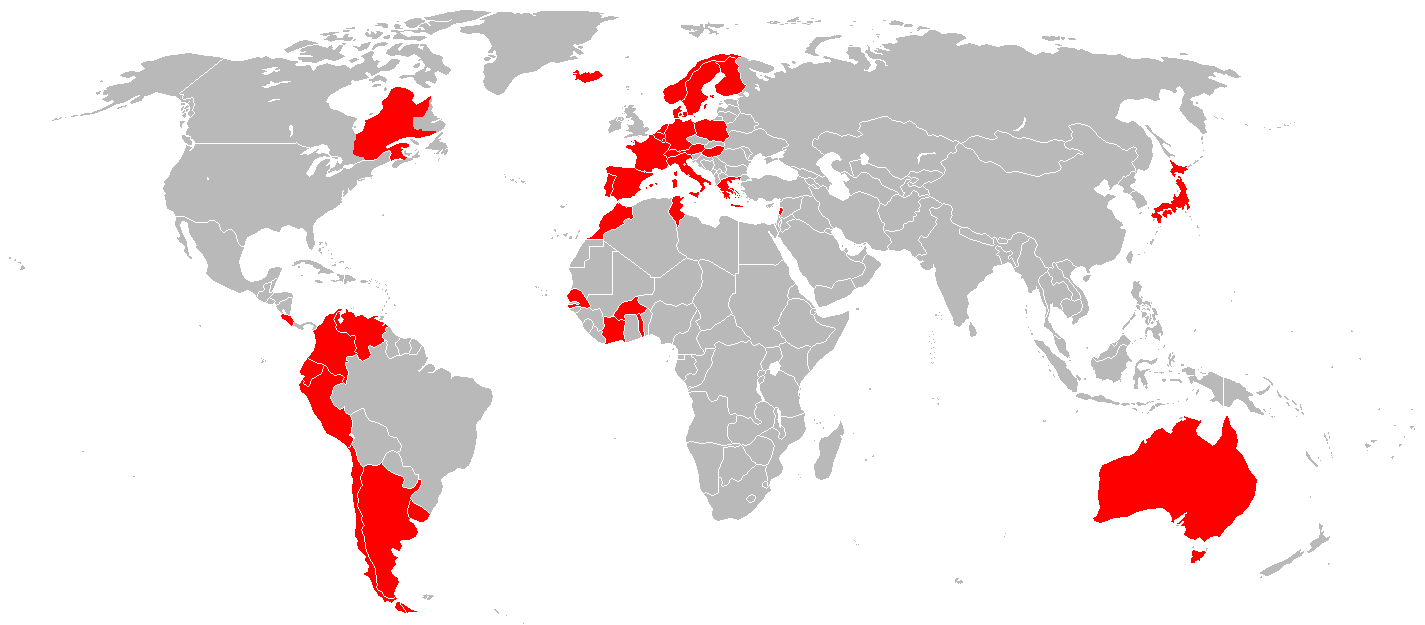
Countries or jurisdictions that have ATTAC branches

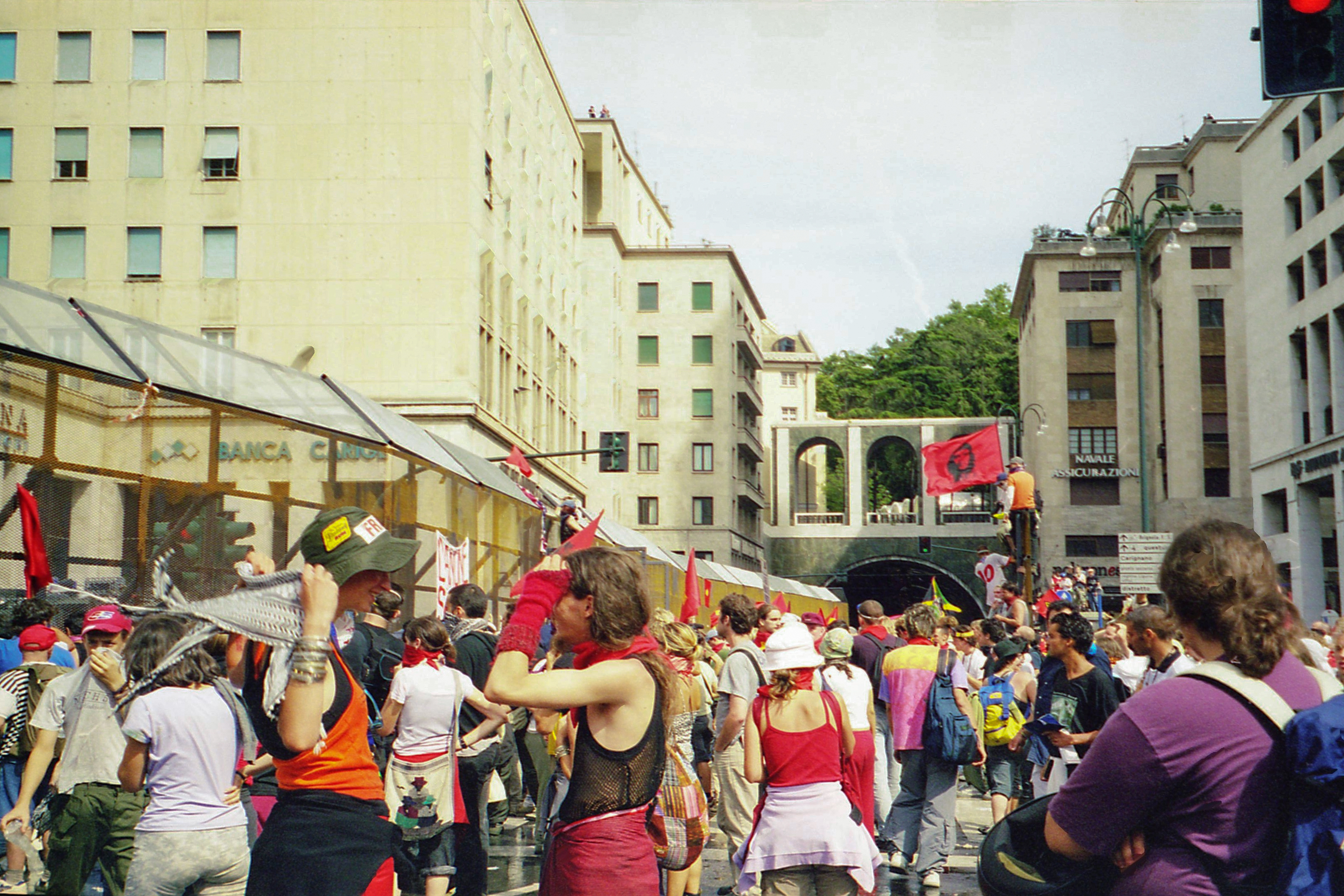
French ATTAC members protest during the 27th G8 summit in Genoa, Italy, 2001

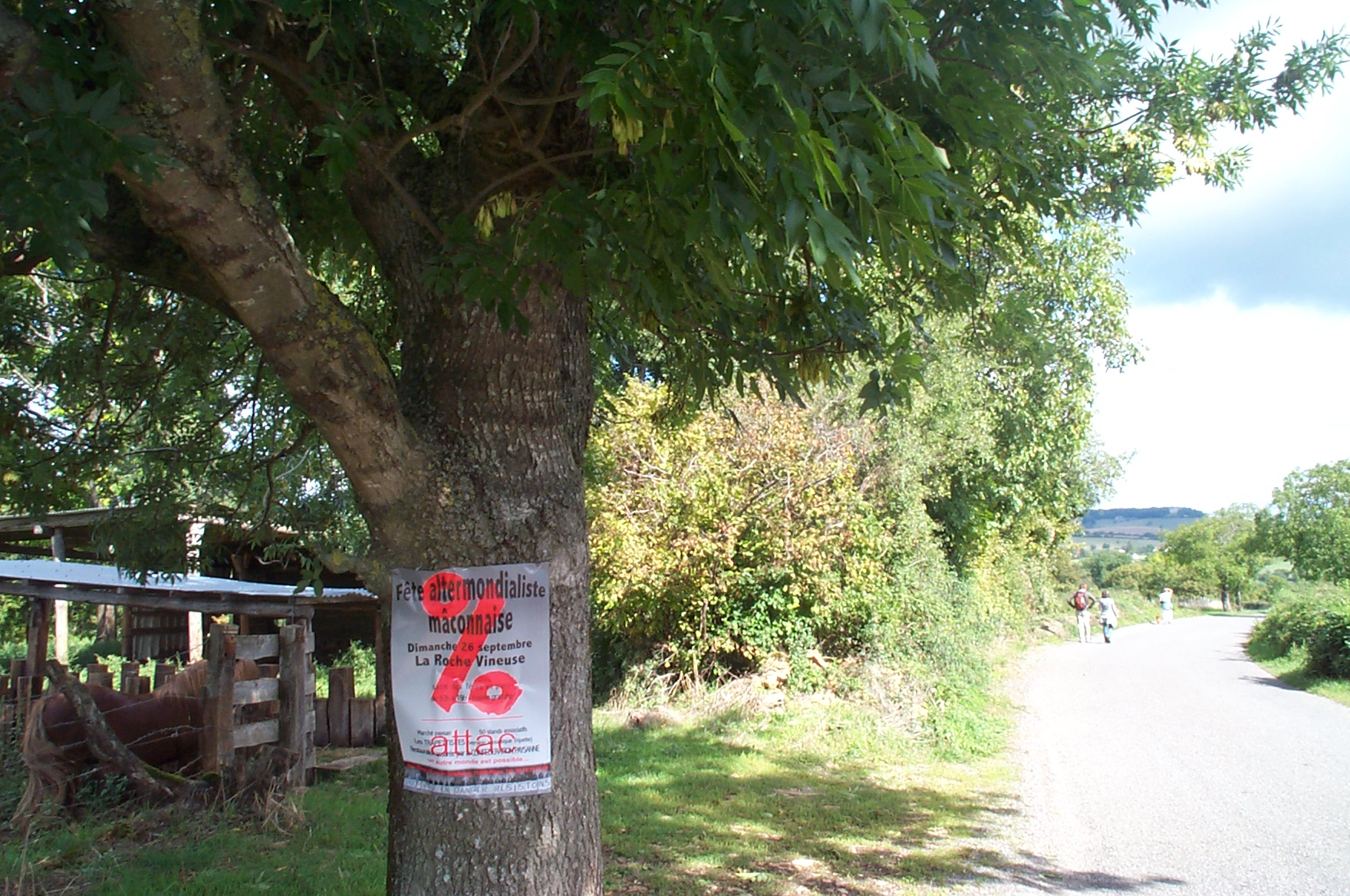
An ATTAC poster in the French countryside, 2004

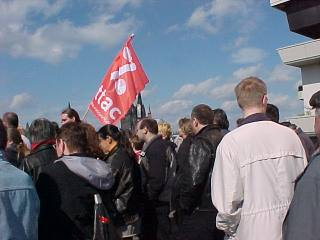
An ATTAC banner in front of Cologne Cathedral, Germany, 2004

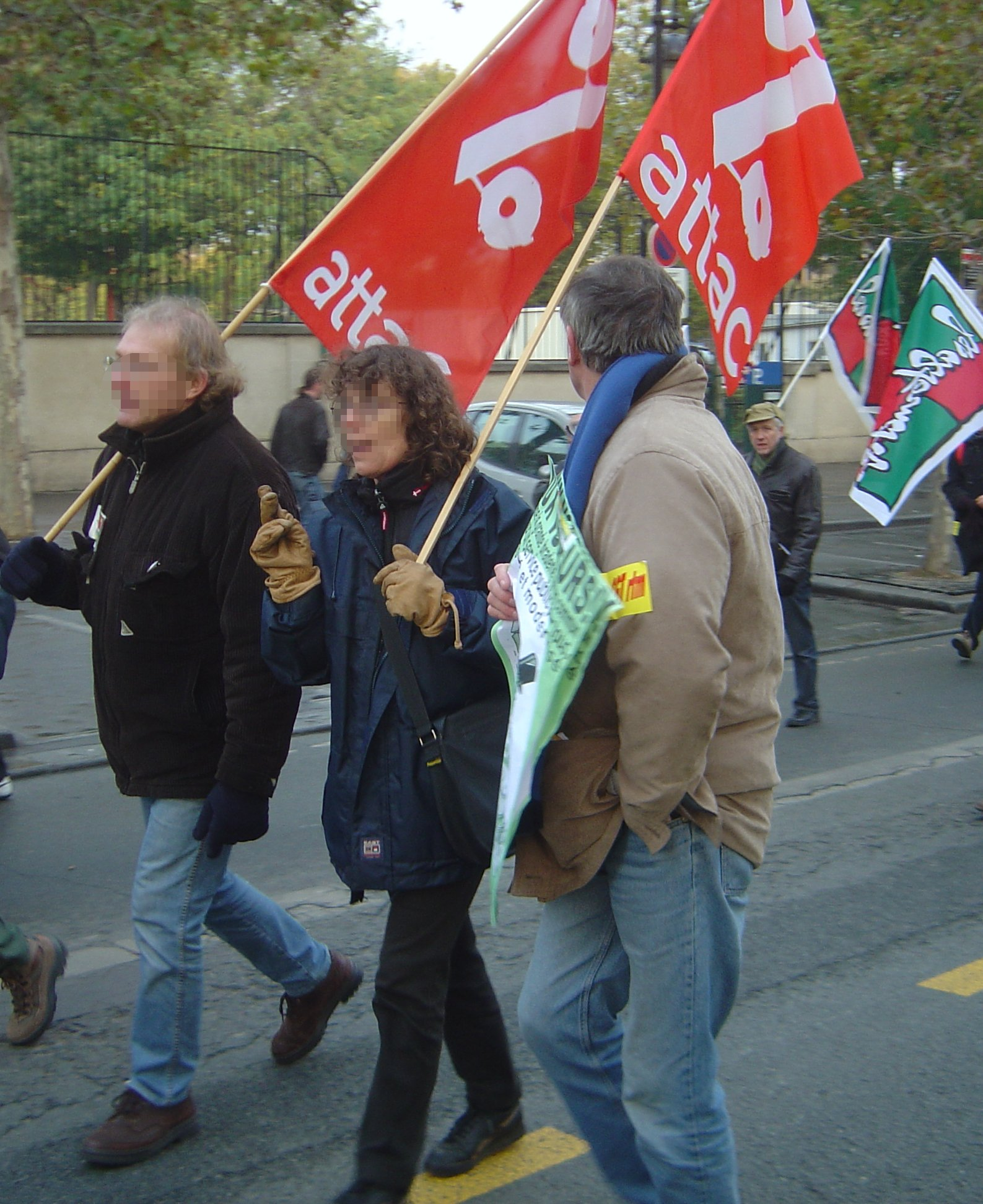
French ATTAC members protesting privatisation and the "dismantling" of public services, 2005

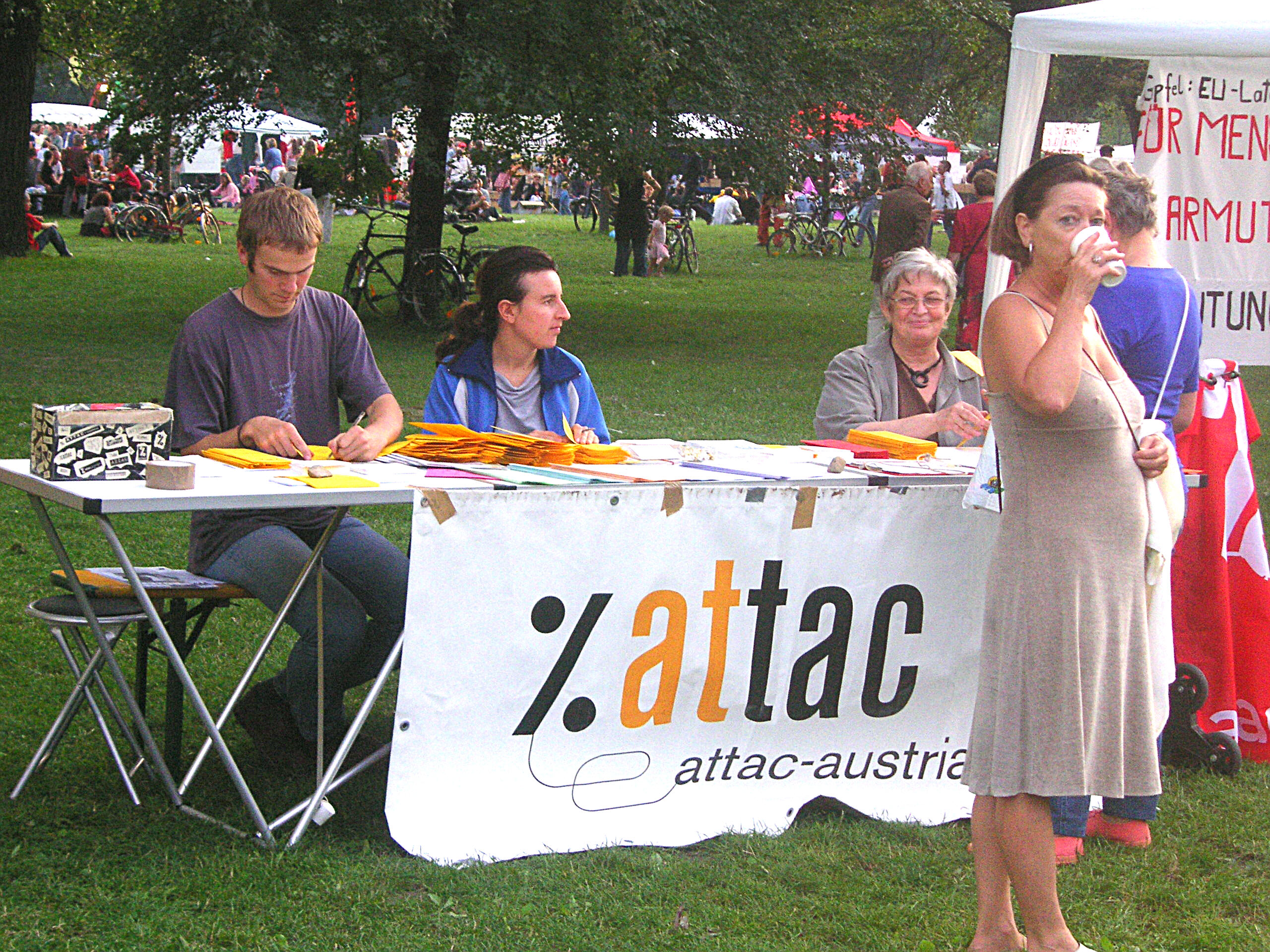
An ATTAC stall at the Volksstimmefest, Vienna, Austria, 2005 (details)

The Association for the Taxation of Financial Transactions and for Citizens' Action (French: Association pour la Taxation des Transactions financières et pour l'Action Citoyenne, ATTAC) is an activist organisation originally created to promote the establishment of a tax on foreign exchange transactions.

== Background ==
Originally called "Action for a Tobin Tax to Assist the Citizen", ATTAC was a single-issue movement demanding the introduction of the so-called Tobin tax on currency speculation. ATTAC has enlarged its scope to a wide range of issues related to globalisation, and monitoring the decisions of the World Trade Organization (WTO), the Organisation for Economic Co-operation and Development (OECD,) and the International Monetary Fund (IMF). ATTAC representatives attend the meetings of the G8 with the goal of influencing policymakers' decisions. In 2007, ATTAC spokesmen criticised Germany for what it called the criminalisation of anti-G8 groups.

At the founding, ATTAC had specific statutory objectives based on the promotion of the Tobin tax. For example, ATTAC Luxembourg specifies in article 1 of its statutes that it:

...aims to produce and communicate information, and to promote and carry out activities of all kinds for the recapture, by the citizens, of the power that the financial sector has on all aspects of political, economic, social and cultural life throughout the world. Such means include the taxation of transactions in foreign exchange markets (Tobin tax).

ATTAC refutes claims that it is an anti-globalisation movement, but it criticises the neoliberal ideology that it sees as dominating economic globalisation. It supports those globalisation policies that their representatives characterise as sustainable and socially just. One of ATTAC's slogans is "The World is not for sale", denouncing the "merchandisation" of society. Another slogan is "Another world is possible", pointing to an alternative globalisation in which people and not profit is in focus.

=== James Tobin opposing ATTAC ===
Attac was founded to promote the Tobin tax by the Keynesian economist James Tobin. Tobin has said that Attac has misused his name. He says he has nothing in common with their goals and supports free trade — "everything that these movements are attacking. They're misusing my name."

== Organisational history ==
In December 1997, Ignacio Ramonet wrote an editorial in Le Monde diplomatique in which he advocated for the establishment of the Tobin tax and the creation of an organisation to pressure governments around the world to introduce the tax. ATTAC was created on 3 June 1998, during a constitutive assembly in France. While it was founded in France it now exists in over forty countries around the world. In France, politicians from the left are members of the association. In Luxembourg, Francois Bausch of the left Green party is the founding politician in the association's initial member list.

ATTAC functions on a principle of decentralisation: local associations organise meetings, conferences, and compose documents that become counter-arguments to the perceived neoliberal discourse. ATTAC aims to formalise the possibility of an alternative to the neoliberal society that is currently required of globalisation. ATTAC aspires to be a movement of popular education.

== Views on Attac and its members in different countries ==
=== Finland ===
Communist Juhani Lohikoski, previously a chairman of Communist Youth League and Socialist League, served as the chairman of Finnish Attac for two terms (2002 – 2004). Yrjö Hakanen, chairman of the Communist Party of Finland, was a member of the board and a member of the founding committee. In March 2002 Aimo Kairamo, the long-time chief editor of the party organ of the Social Democrat Party, resigned from Attac and recommended the same decision for other social democrats because of the left-wing minority communists' leading positions. Soon also the social democrat foreign minister Erkki Tuomioja considered to follow Kairamo's example.

=== Sweden ===
Researcher Malin Gawell covers the birth and development of Attac Sweden in her doctoral thesis on activist entrepreneurship. She suggests that Attac in Sweden was formed by people seeking a new way of organising with flat hierarchy, and with the strongly sensed need of making a change as the driving force.
From another perspective, Sydsvenskan newspaper suggested that the downturn of memberships in Swedish Attac after the hype in the beginning of 2001 may be due to its views on trade policies.

== Issues and activities ==
The main issues covered by ATTAC today are:

- Control of financial markets (e.g., Tobin tax)
- "Fair" instead of "free" trade, via democratic control of the World Trade Organization and international financial institutions such the International Monetary Fund, Worldbank, European Union, North American Free Trade Agreement, Free Trade Area of the Americas, and G8.
- Defense of public goods - air, water, information
- Defense of public social services - like those relevant to health, social services, and social security. For example, it is against the privatisation of pensions and of the health care system. ATTAC has also taken a position on genetically modified organisms. ATTAC also opposes General Agreement on Trade in Services.
- The struggle to end tax evasion (tax havens) as practiced by transnational corporations and rich individuals
- Sustainable globalisation
- Cancellation of the debt of Developing Countries.
- ATTAC campaigned against the Treaty establishing a Constitution for Europe.
- ATTAC is involved in fighting against climate change, for environmental justice and, especially, in supporting Alternatiba, Village of Alternatives.

In France, ATTAC associates with many other left-wing causes.

== Nestlégate ==
In 2008, the Swiss multinational food and beverage company Nestlé was hit by a scandal which was later called Nestlégate by the media. Between the years 2003 and 2005, Nestlé hired the external Security company Securitas AG to spy on the Swiss branch of Attac. Nestlé started the monitoring when Attac Switzerland decided to work on a critical book about Nestlé.

In response to the Nestlégate, Attac Switzerland filed a lawsuit against Nestlé. The lawsuit was decided in favour of Attac in January 2013, as the personal rights of the observed were violated. They received a compensation for damages of 3000 Swiss francs each (about 3230 USD at the date of the proclamation of sentence).

== See also ==
- Alter-globalisation
- Anti-globalisation
- Clearstream scandal, a clearing house (meta-bank) involved in one of the biggest financial scandals ever
- Currency transaction tax
- Financial transaction tax
- Global financial system
- MRAP, anti-racist NGO engaged in the creation of ATTAC
- Robin Hood tax
- Tobin tax
- Ireland as a tax haven
