= Alda Sousa =

Portuguese politician

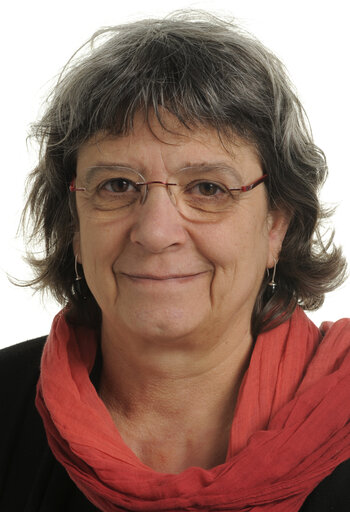
- Born: August 4, 1953 (age 72); Porto, Portugal
- Occupations: Politician, academic lecturer
- Office: Member of the European Parliament
- Political party: Left Bloc

Alda Maria Botelho Correia Sousa (born August 4, 1953, in Porto) is a Portuguese academic and politician, and a Member of the European Parliament in her VII term.

== Biography ==
A graduate of mathematics from the University of Porto, she obtained a doctorate in biomedical sciences. Professionally associated with her alma mater and the Abel Salazar Biomedical Sciences Institute (as a professor).

She became involved in the activities of the Left Bloc. From 2002 to 2005, she was a member of the IX Assembly of the Republic. On May 9, 2012, she assumed the position of Member of the European Parliament for the VII term, replacing the late Miguel Portas. In the European Parliament, she became a member of the European United Left–Nordic Green Left group.
