= Adrian Monck =

British journalist

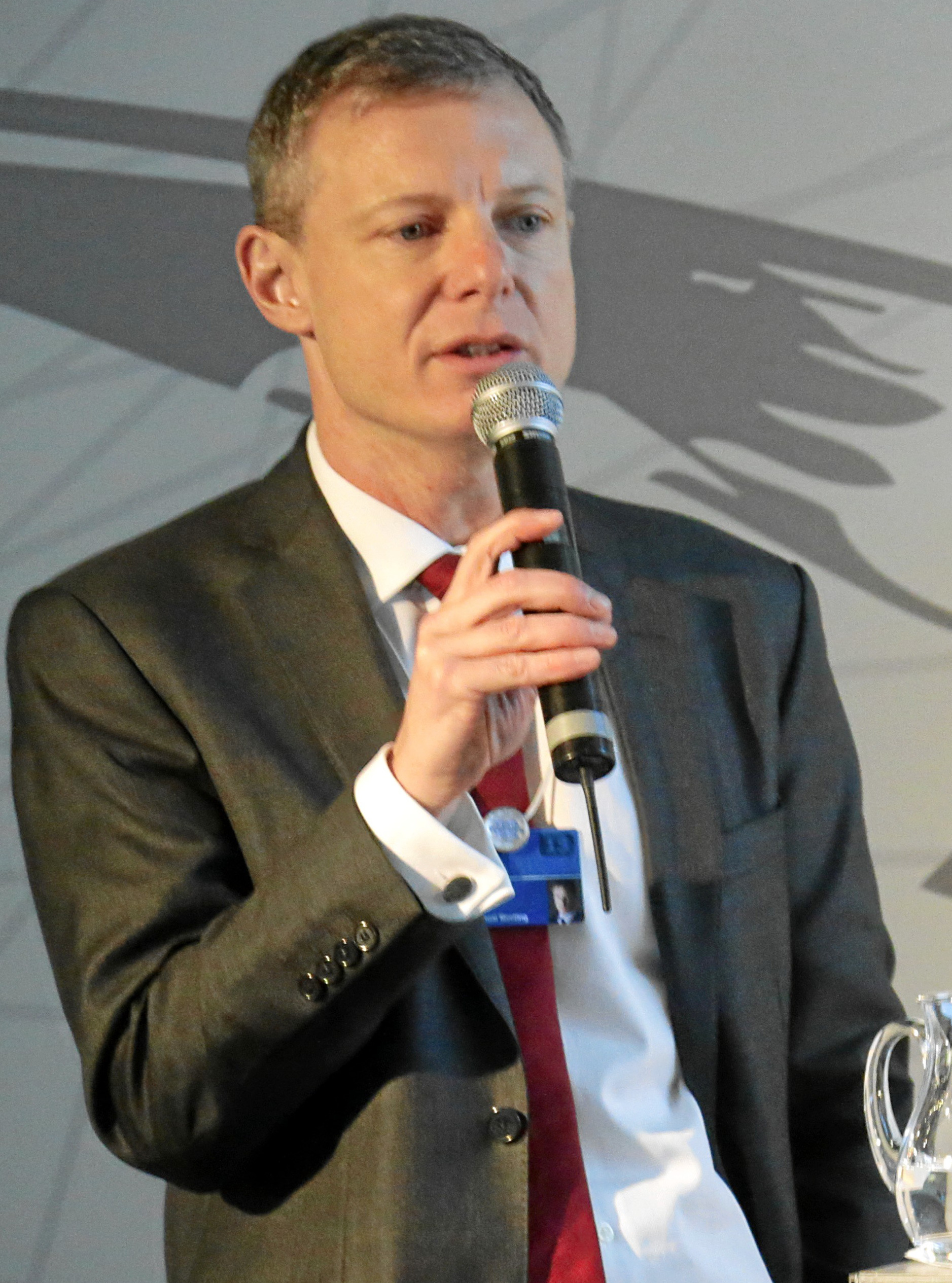
- Adrian Monck at the World Economic Forum Annual Meeting, 2013
- Born: 1965 (age 60–61); United Kingdom
- Education: Exeter College, Oxford, London Business School
- Website: adrianmonck.com

Adrian Monck is a British former journalism professor, writer on media and current affairs, and business executive. He served as Managing Director and Head of Public and Social Engagement at the World Economic Forum from 2009 to 2023.

== Education ==
Adrian Monck graduated from Exeter College, Oxford in 1988 with an honours degree in Modern History. At Oxford he was JCR President and edited Cherwell. In 2000 he was awarded an MBA from London Business School.

== Television journalism ==
Monck went on to be a TV journalist with CBS News (1988–92), ITV News (1992–1996), five news (1996–2004) and Sky News (2005). His work on the Dunblane massacre and in Bosnia received awards from Britain's Royal Television Society, and on aid to Rwanda won the special report gold medal, and overall festival prize at the 1995 New York Festivals.

He launched and was Deputy and Managing Editor of ITN's service for Britain's fifth terrestrial network, Channel 5. The service, fronted by Kirsty Young, won awards for its new informal style of news presentation and reporting which were quickly copied by rivals.

== Academia ==
Before becoming managing director and Head of Communications at the World Economic Forum Adrian Monck headed City University's Department of Journalism from 2005 – 2009.

He is an advocate of extending UK TV regulation of journalism to newspapers and online media but is critical of public funding for journalism. In 2006 he presented a lecture entitled Why the Public Doesn't Deserve the News.

He is quoted in Bad News From Israel, by Greg Philo (of the Glasgow Media Group), Howard Tumber and Frank Webster's Journalists Under Fire: Information War and Journalistic Practices and Richard Lindley's And Finally...The History of ITN.
