= Takis Hadjigeorgiou =

Cypriot politician

Takis Hadjigeorgiou MEP
- Τάκης Χατζηγεωργίου
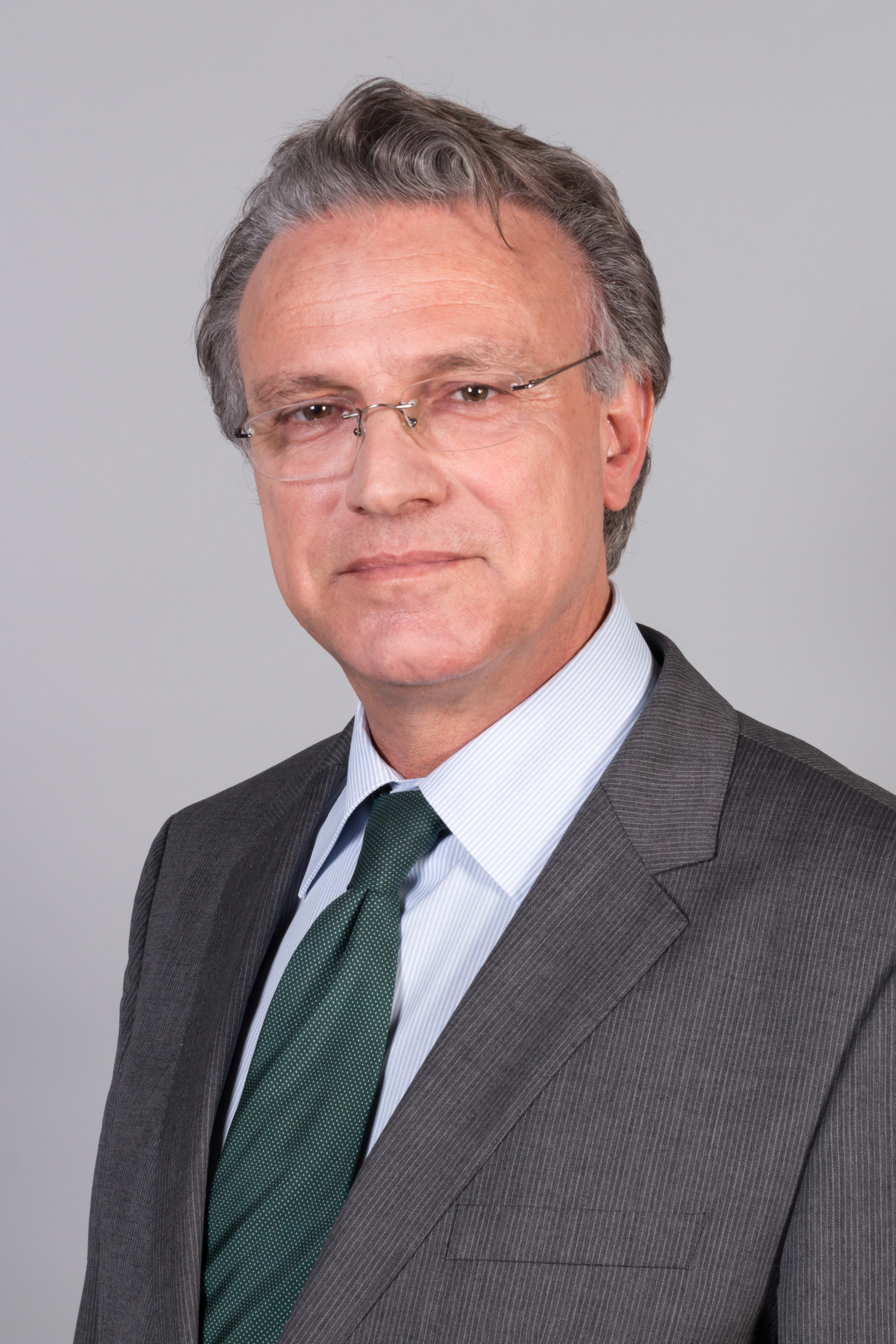

Member of the European Parliament
- In office 2009–2019

Member of the House of Representatives of Cyprus
- In office 1996–2009

Personal details
- Born: 11 December 1956 (age 69) Pano Akourdaleia, Paphos, Cyprus
- Party: Progressive Party of Working People
- Education: National and Kapodistrian University of Athens

Takis Hadjigeorgiou (Greek: Τάκης Χατζηγεωργίου; born 11 December 1956) is a Cypriot politician. He was a Member of the European Parliament for the Progressive Party of Working People, sitting with the European United Left–Nordic Green Left group, on the European Parliament's Committee of Foreign Affairs from 2009 until 2019.

He is also a member of the Delegation to the EU-Turkey Joint Parliamentary Committee and Delegation to the EU-Armenia, EU-Azerbaijan and EU-Georgia Parliamentary Cooperation Committees.

Born in Pano Akourdaleia, Paphos in 1956, Hadjigeorgiou completed his studies in law National and Kapodistrian University of Athens and journalism (Journalism Workshop) in Athens in 1980 and subsequently moved back to Cyprus. Upon returning to his home country, he worked as a freelance journalist and later produced and aired programs with the Cyprus Broadcasting Corporation. He became famous through his TV talk show "Χωρίς Πλαίσια" (Without Borders), which covered controversial issues touching upon the more difficult aspects of Cyprus history. Between 1995 and 2007 he served as the Managing Director of Radio Astra 92.8 in Cyprus.

In 1996 he was elected to the House of Representatives as a candidate of the left wing party, AKEL, for Nicosia and was re-elected in the parliamentary elections of 2001 and 2006. He was one of the three vice-presidents of the Executive Committee of the Cyprus Group to the Inter-Parliamentary Union.

In the House of Representatives, he served as a member of the House Standing Committee on Educational Affairs, of the House Standing Committee on European Affairs, of the House Standing Committee on Financial and Budgetary Affairs and of the House Standing Committee on Internal Affairs. He is also a member of the delegations of the House to the Inter-Parliamentary Union, to the Parliamentary Assembly on the Mediterranean and to the Conference of Community and European Affairs Committees (COSAC).

As an elected member of the European Parliament, to which he was elected on 6 June 2009 as a candidate for AKEL, Hadjigeorgiou serves on the European Parliament's Committee on Foreign Affairs and is a Vice-President of the European Left. He is also a substitute member of the Committee on Industry, Research and Energy.

Hadjigeorgiou is a politician highly interested about the Cyprus problem. Over the years he held forward looking positions and supported strongly the struggle for a settlement. He writes extensively in newspapers and debates regularly on TV regarding the Cyprus problem.

Hadjigeorgiou serves in the Advisory Board of Cyprus Safer Internet Center CyberEthics.

Hadjigeorgiou is also a philosopher and writer. He has published two poetry collections (1987, 1999) and a book (2004), which includes interviews he conducted when working as a journalist.
