= Universidad Nacional del Altiplano de Puno =

University in Puno, Peru

National University of the Altiplano of Puno
- Universidad Nacional del Altiplano de Puno
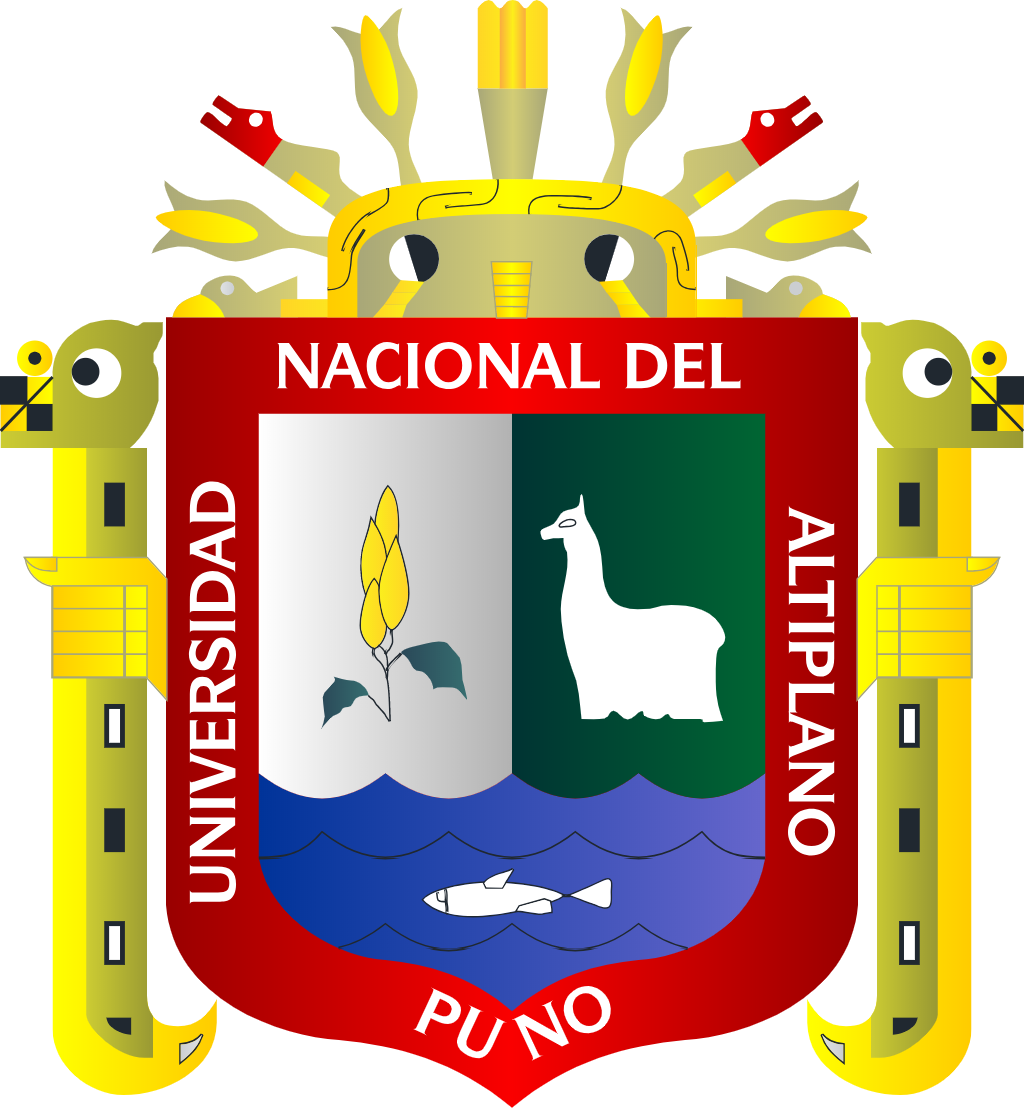
- Type: Public university
- Established: August 29, 1856; 168 years ago
- Rector: Paulino Machaca Ari
- Address: Av. Sesquicentenario No. 1150, Puno, Peru
- Website: www.unap.edu.pe

The Universidad Nacional del Altiplano de Puno (UNAP, English: 'National University of the Altiplano of Puno') is a public university located in the city of Puno, Peru.

Founded in 1856, it was one of the first public universities founded within the Department of Puno. Initially, it was created as a training school for the aristocracy. Today, UNAP has 37 professional schools which are organized into 20 faculties.

== History ==
Through an act of 29 August 1856, president Ramón Castilla founded the Universidad de Puno. Although the act founding the university was passed in 1856, the date which it officially opened is subject to debate. There are claims that the institution opened on 1 March 1858, while other believe it opened 1 May 1859.

On 6 December 1860, the government of Puno designated San Carlos Borromeo as the patron saint of the university. The university was then referred to as Universidad de San Carlos de Puno, adopting the honorific name of the nearby Glorioso Colegio Nacional de San Carlos. In the early 20th century a senator from Puno, Enrique Torres Belón, pointed out that legally the "Universidad de San Carlos de Puno" does not exist as the institution has been referred to by other names in official documents, however, this claim has been refuted by other scholars and academic officials. This original institution, however, closed in 1866 due to socio-political and economic problems. It was not recorded on the National Regulation of Public Instruction of 1876.

The name of the university underwent several subsequent name changes. In 1961 it was named the Universidad Nacional Técnica del Altiplano (UNTA, English: 'National Technical University of the Altiplano'), by Law No. 13516. In 1983, it became the Universidad Nacional del Altiplano (UNA), by Law No. 23733. Finally, in 2014 it became known as the Universidad Nacional del Altiplano de Puno (UNAP), by Law No. 30220.

On 30 December 2017, the resolution of the board of directors N° 101-2017-SUNEDU / CD was instituted, through which the National Superintendency of University Education (Spanish: Superintendencia Nacional de Educación Superior Universitaria) granted the university its institutional license.

== Faculties ==
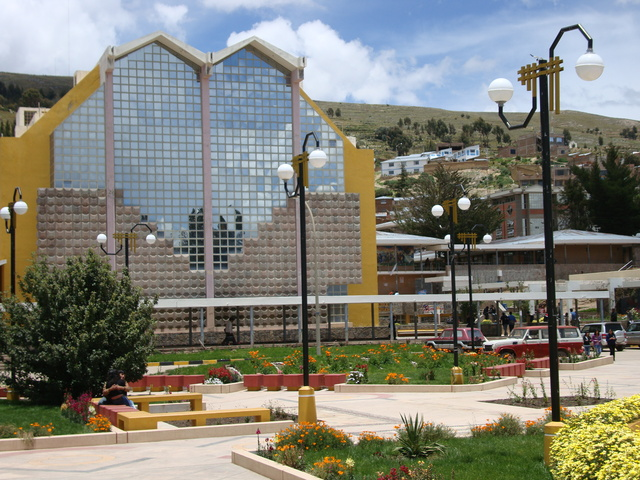
Central Library

1. Ciencias Agrarias (Agricultural sciences)
2. Medicina Veterinaria y Zootecnía (Veterinary medicine and zootechnics)
3. Ingeniería Civil y Arquitectura (Civil engineering and architecture)
4. Ciencias Biológicas (Biological sciences)
5. Ciencias Contables (Accounting sciences)
6. Ciencias de la Educación (Educational Sciences)
7. Ciencias de la Salud (Health sciences)
8. Ciencias Jurídicas y Políticas (Legal and political sciences)
9. Ciencias Sociales (Social sciences)
10. Enfermería (Nursing)
11. Ingeniería Agrícola (Agricultural engineering)
12. Ingeniería de Minas (Mine engineering)
13. Ingeniería Económica (Economic engineering)
14. Ingeniería Estadística e Informática (Statistical and informational engineering)
15. Ingeniería Geológica y Metalúrgica (Geological and metallurgical engineering)
16. Ingeniería Química (Chemical Engineering)
17. Medicina Humana (Human medicine)
18. Trabajo Social (Social work)
19. Ingeniería Mecánica Eléctrica, Electrónica y de Sistemas (Electrical, electronic, and systems engineering)
20. Escuela de postgrado (School of postgraduate studies)

== Honorary degree recipients ==
The following list includes notable recipients of honorary degrees from the National University of the Altiplano de Puno.

- Rómulo Mucho Mamani, 2012
- Eugenio Raúl Zaffaroni, 2014
- Adolfo Alvarado Velloso, 2015
- Ulrich Sieber, 2015
- Luis Enrique López-Hurtado Quiroz, 2015
- Rodolfo Cerrón Palomino, 2015
- Miguel Polaino Navarrete, 2016
- Susana Vilca Achata, 2016
- Luis Alberto Cordero Lecca, 2016
- Ralph Bolton, 2016
- Manuel Atienza Rodríguez, 2016
- Robert Alexy, 2016
- Juan Marchena Fernández, 2016
- Carlos Augusto Ramos Nuñez, 2017
- José Miguel Aguilera Radic, 2017
- Néstor Pedro Sagüés, 2018
- Gerardo Hierro Molina, 2018
- Víctor Otazú Monzón, 2018
- Juan Antonio García Amado, 2019
- Laurent Thévenot, 2019
- Darío Rodríguez Mansilla, 2019
- Carlos Julio Reynoso, 2019
- Boaventura De Sousa Santos, 2020
- Adrián Oscar Scribano, 2020
- Claus Roxin, 2021
- Luigi Ferrajoli, 2022

== Journals ==
=== Revista de Derecho de la Universidad Nacional del Altiplano de Puno ===
The Revista de Derecho, is a semiannual peer-reviewed law journal published by the Faculty of Ciencias Jurídicas y Políticas at the UNAP. It was established in 2014 and is published by the University. It is produced by editor-in-chief Boris G. Espezúa Salmón in collaboration with Raúl Zaffaroni, Michael Espinoza, and other researchers. The journal is abstracted and indexed in DOAJ.
