= Anja Weisgerber =

German lawyer and politician (born 1976)

Anja Weisgerber MdB
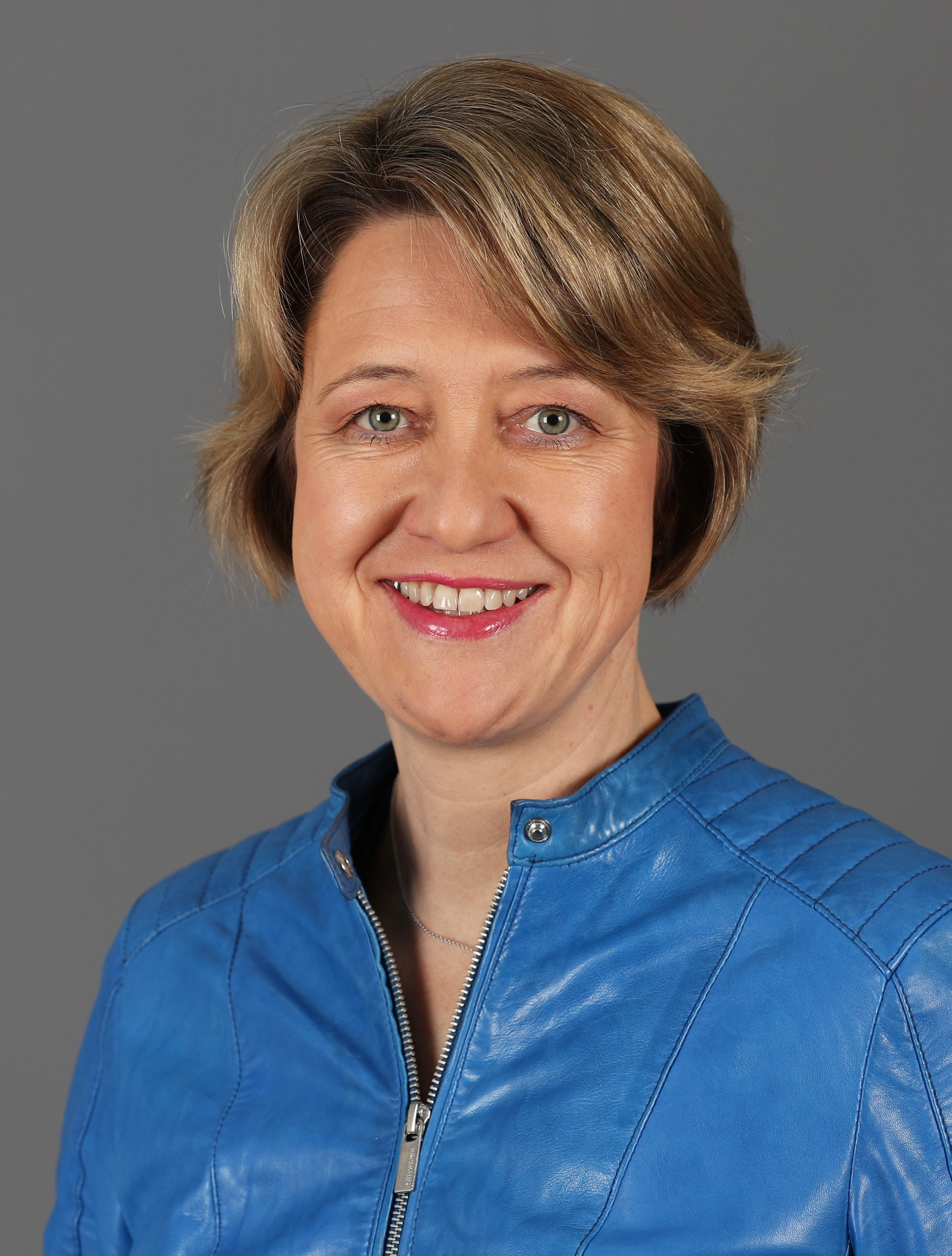
- Weisgerber in 2020

Member of the Bundestag; for Schweinfurt
- Incumbent
- Assumed office 22 October 2013
- Preceded by: Michael Glos

Member of the European Parliament; for Germany
- In office 20 July 2004 – 21 October 2013
- Preceded by: Multi-member district
- Succeeded by: Gabriele Stauner

Personal details
- Born: 11 March 1976 (age 50) Schweinfurt, West Germany
- Party: Christian Social Union; European People's Party
- Children: 2
- Education: University of Würzburg
- Profession: Lawyer

Anja Weisgerber (born 11 March 1976) is a German lawyer and politician. She currently is a member of the German Bundestag representing Schweinfurt for the Christian Social Union in Bavaria (CSU), part of the European People's Party (EPP). She previously served as a Member of the European Parliament (MEP) for Bavaria. In addition to her political work, she serves as of counsel at the Frankfurt office of German law firm GSK Stockmann & Kollegen.

== Early life education ==
- 1996–1997: Research assistant to Ulrich Sieber
- 2000: First state law examination
- 2001: doctorate in law
- 2003: second state law examination
- 2001–2003: Law officer, District Court, and Regional Assembly, Schweinfurt, Lower Franconia Government, Dr Haas Solicitors, Schweinfurt and Price Waterhouse Coopers Veltins, Rechtsanwaltsgesellschaft mbH, Munich
- since 2004: Lawyer

== Political career ==
=== Beginnings ===
- 1995–1997: Member of the District Executive of the Schweinfurt Junge Union
- 1997: Founded Schwebheim Junge Union association
- since 1997: Vice-chair of the Schweinfurt Junge Union
- 1996–1999: District Executive Officer, Lower Franconia Junge Union
- 1997–1999: Member of the District Executive of the Lower Franconia Junge Union, Chairwoman of the Schwebheim Junge Union
- Member of the Junge Union Regional Executive
- head of Bavaria Junge Union environment working group
- since 2003: Member of the CSU District Executive
- since 2002: Councillor, Schwebheim

=== Member of the European Parliament (2004–2013) ===
In the 2004 European elections, Weisgerber was elected as a Member of the European Parliament for Bavaria. Throughout her tenure, she was a member of the European Parliament's Committee on the Environment, Public Health and Food Safety. In addition, she served as a substitute member on the Committee on Employment and Social Affairs between 2004 and 2009 and on the Committee on the Internal Market and Consumer Protection between 2006 and 2013. From 2009, she was the co-chairwoman of the informal European Parliament Osteoporosis Interest Group.

Weisgerber was also a member of the delegation to the Parliamentary Assembly of the Mediterranean (2004-2013) and of the delegation for relations with the Mashreq countries Lebanon, Syria, Jordan and Egypt (2009-2013).

In her capacity as member of the committee on the Environment, Public Health and Food Safety, Weisgerber issued a report on the 2007 revision of the EU Directive on Air Quality. In a vote in February 2009, an overwhelming majority of MEPs on the committee rejected a resolution drawn up by Weisgerber and fellow German MEP Holger Krahmer, which said the commission should not ban incandescent light bulbs.

In 2009, the CSU chose Weisgerber to be the party list's number 3 for the 2009 European elections, following Markus Ferber and Angelika Niebler.

=== Member of the Bundestag (2013–present) ===
Weisgerber has been a member of the German Bundestag since the 2013 federal election, when she succeeded Michael Glos as representative of the Schweinfurt/Kitzingen electoral district. She has since been serving on the committee on the Environment, Nature Conservation, Building and Nuclear Safety and on the Sub-Committee on European Law. On the committee on the Environment, Nature Conservation, Building and Nuclear Safety, she serves as her parliamentary group's spokeswoman and as rapporteur on urban development funding and on climate change. In the latter capacity, she participated in the 2015 United Nations Climate Change Conference in Paris.

In addition to her committee assignments, Weisgerber is a member of the German-French Parliamentary Friendship Group, the German-US Parliamentary Friendship Group and the German-Canadian Parliamentary Friendship Group. She has been a member of the German delegation to the Franco-German Parliamentary Assembly since 2022.

In the negotiations to form a coalition government under the leadership of Chancellor Angela Merkel following the 2017 federal elections, Weisgerber was part of the working group on urban development, led by Bernd Althusmann, Kurt Gribl and Natascha Kohnen. In 2019, she was appointed by the leaders of CDU and CSU, Annegret Kramp-Karrenbauer and Markus Söder, to the parties' ad hoc steering group on climate policy.

== Other activities ==
- Nuclear Waste Disposal Fund (KENFO), Alternate Member of the Board of Trustees (since 2017)

== Political positions ==
In June 2017, Weisgerber voted against Germany's introduction of same-sex marriage.

== Recognition ==
- Medal for Extraordinary Merits for Bavaria in a United Europe (2008)

== Personal life ==
Weisgerber is a former Bavarian tennis champion. She is married to Carsten Deibel, a physicist at the Chemnitz University of Technology.
