= Michael Espinoza Coila =

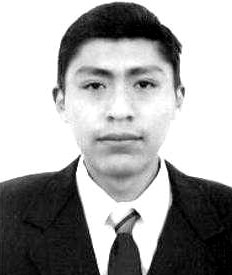
- Born: May 15, 1991 (age 34); Puno
- Occupations: Lawyer and Professor

Academic background
- Education: Glorioso Colegio Nacional de San Carlos Universidad Nacional del Altiplano de Puno; Universidad Nacional de Rio Cuarto University of San Martín de Porres
- Alma mater: Universidad Nacional del Altiplano de Puno
- Thesis: Foundations for the criminological theory of piety in the framework of human criminal law that reduces punitive power and theological anthropology (2024)
- Doctoral advisor: Boris Gilmar Espezúa Salmón; Eugenio Raúl Zaffaroni

Academic work
- Discipline: Law
- Sub-discipline: Criminal Law, Criminology.
- Notable works: Principle of the best interest of the student, Computer criminal law, Criminology of pity.
- Influenced: Eugenio Raúl Zaffaroni
- Website: https://derecho.unap.edu.pe/mespinoza/

Michael Espinoza Coila (born 1991, in Puno) is a peruvian lawyer, university professor, human rights activist and catechist, dedicating himself to Criminology and information technology (ICT). He is known for developing the principle-law-procedure of the best interests of the student and the criminological theory of piety, is also a law activist for university student.

== Early life and education ==
He was born in the city of Puno, on May 15, 1991, his education was carried out in the Glorioso Colegio Nacional de San Carlos where he excelled in history, communication and especially in the use of information technologies with the execution of the bibliographic administration system project for his school.

He studied for a lawyer at the Universidad Nacional del Altiplano and Universidad Nacional de Río Cuarto, where he acquired a taste for Criminal Law and Criminology, leading a research circle and being a disciple of Eugenio Raúl Zaffaroni, Argentine jurist who advised him on the thesis on computer criminal law.

He has a doctorate in law and a master in Criminal Procedure Law. He is currently a university professor of criminology at the "Facultad de Ciencias Jurídicas y Políticas de la Universidad Nacional del Altiplano de Puno". He was qualified as a RENACYT researcher by the National Council of Science, Technology and Innovation of Peru (CONCYTEC), he was also an associate researcher at the "Instituto Latinoamericano de Criminología y Desarrollo Social "(INCRIDES), Mendeley Advisor, member of the "Círculo de Investigación Líderes Optimistas Revelando Derecho" (CILORD), honorary member of "Ilustre Colegio Abogados de Puno".

He also served as a catechist for the Catholic Church, performing pastoral work in Puno. He dedicated himself to carrying out comparative studies of biblical translations in Spanish, especially in Catholic editions.

== Main contributions ==
- Theoretical Foundations: He has developed a solid theoretical basis for the criminology of mercy in the Peruvian context, analyzing how this current can contribute to reducing punitive power and promoting a more humane justice.
- Legal Archaeology: He has explored the origins of punitive power in pre-Incan and Incan cultures, seeking to understand the historical roots of our penal system.
- Computer Criminal Law: He has analyzed the impact of information technologies on the exercise of punitive power and has proposed measures to protect fundamental rights in the digital age.
- Analysis of the Peruvian penal system: He has carried out a critical analysis of the Peruvian penal system, identifying its weaknesses and proposing alternatives based on the principles of the criminology of mercy.
- Research on punitive power: He has investigated the manifestation of punitive power in different areas, such as computer crimes and illicit drug trafficking.
- Connection with theological anthropology: He has explored the connection between the criminology of mercy and theological anthropology, seeking a deeper understanding of human nature and its implications for criminal law.
- Promotion of restorative justice: He has been an advocate of restorative justice as a more effective and humane alternative to traditional criminal justice.

== Publications ==
His academic production includes articles and books on various subjects: The best interest of the student, notes for a pre-university (communication), monograph of the Vilque district, the Peruvian State and the separation of powers, natural law in the Peruvian Constitution of 1993, the APA style, the Acora peasant rounds, computer criminal law, accessibility, crimes and other.

=== Books ===
- The idea of justice in the resolution of conflicts in the Single District Central of the Peasant Round of Acora [La idea de justicia en la resolución de conflictos en la Central Única Distrital de la Ronda Campesina de Acora].
- APA Style Citation Guide, Sixth Edition [Guía de citados según el estilo APA, sexta edición].
- Notes from a Pre-university: Communication [Apuntes de un Preuniversitario: Comunicación].
- History and Law [Historia y Derecho] (Volume 1 and 2), participate as editor.
- Legal Dictionary: Spanish - Quechua - Aymara [Diccionario Jurídico: Español - Quechua - Aymara], participate as a collaborator.
- Guide to citations and references according to the seventh edition of the APA style [Guía de citados y referencias según la séptima edición del estilo APA].
- History and Law: Tribute to Carlos Ramos Núñez [Historia y Derecho: Homenaje a Carlos Ramos Núñez].
- Essays on the application of the Theory of the State in the some cultures of ancient Peru [Ensayos sobre aplicación de la Teoría del Estado en las algunas culturas del Perú antiguo].

=== Chapters of the book ===
- Academic Criminology at the Faculty of Legal and Political Sciences of the National University of the Altiplano of Puno [Criminología académica en la Facultad de Ciencias Jurídicas y Políticas de la Universidad Nacional del Altiplano de Puno].
- Physical environment that violates the principle-right of accessibility, and the social model of disability as a proposal for the development of an accessible university: Case of the National University of the Altiplano [Entorno físico que vulnera el principio-derecho de accesibilidad, y el modelo social de la discapacidad como propuesta para el desarrollo de una universidad accesible: Caso Universidad Nacional del Altiplano].
- Brief history of the Faculty of Legal and Political Sciences of the National University of the Altiplano of Puno, on the way to the bicentennial of its creation [Breve historia de la Facultad de Ciencias Jurídicas y Políticas de la Universidad Nacional del Altiplano de Puno, camino al bicentenario de su creación].
- A look at the criminology of José Antonio Encinas Franco at the beginning of university legal indigenism [Un vistazo a la criminología de José Antonio Encinas franco en los inicios del indigenismo jurídico universitario].
- Origin and structural characters of the punitive power in ancient Peru from the precautionary criminology [Origen y caracteres estructurales del poder punitivo en el Perú antiguo desde la Criminología Cautelar].
- Approach to the foundation of the cultures of ancient Peru as states [Aproximación a la fundamentación de las culturas del Perú antiguo como estados].
- Control technology as an amplifier of punitive power [La tecnología de control como amplificador del poder punitivo].

=== Thesis ===
- Computer criminal law: delegitimization of punitive power in the control society [Derecho penal informático: deslegitimación del poder punitivo en la sociedad de control,] for the professional title of lawyer.
- Archeology from precautionary criminology on the origin and structural characteristics of punitive power in ancient Peru [Arqueología desde la criminología cautelar sobre el origen y caracteres estructurales del poder punitivo en el Perú antiguo], for master of laws degree.
- Fundamentals for the criminological theory of piety within the framework of human criminal law reducing punitive power and theological anthropology [Fundamentos para la teoría criminológica de la piedad en el marco del derecho penal humano reductor del poder punitivo y la antropología teológica], for the degree of doctor.
