= Schünemann =

Schünemann is a German surname. Notable people with the surname include:

- Bernd Schünemann (born 1944), German jurist
- Holger Jens Schünemann (born 1967), German epidemiologist
- Otto Schünemann (1891–1944) German General lieutenant
- Uwe Schünemann (born 1964) German politician
- Werner Schünemann (born 1959) Brazilian actor and film director
