= Friedrich Funk =

German politician

Member of the Bundestag; for Schweinfurt
- In office 7 September 1949 – 5 August 1963
- Preceded by: Constituency established
- Succeeded by: Centa Haas

Personal details
- Born: 3 October 1900 Prichsenstadt, Germany
- Died: 5 August 1963 (aged 62) Volkach, West Germany
- Party: Christian Social Union
- Education: University of Hohenheim

Friedrich Jakob Funk (3 October 1900 – 5 August 1963) was a German politician of the Christian Social Union (CSU).

== Early life and career ==
Funk, who was a Protestant Christian, was a soldier in World War I despite his young age. After the war he studied agriculture in Munich and graduated as a farmer. In 1932 he took over the parental lease in Neuses am Sand, which he acquired in 1936.

== Political career ==
Friedrich Funk was elected as a non-party candidate in the district council of Gerolzhofen in 1948. He joined the CSU in 1949 after being appointed as a candidate for the Bundestag and had been a member of the German Bundestag since its first election in 1949 until his death in 1963. He was always elected directly to parliament in the constituency of Schweinfurt. From 1953 to 1957, he was deputy chairman of the CSU national group in the CDU / CSU parliamentary group. From 1957 until his death he was deputy chairman of the Bundestag's Committee on Petitions. On May 17, 1963, he was awarded the Bavarian Order of Merit.

== See also ==
- List of Bavarian Christian Social Union politicians
