= Eduardo Barcesat =

Argentine politician and human rights activist

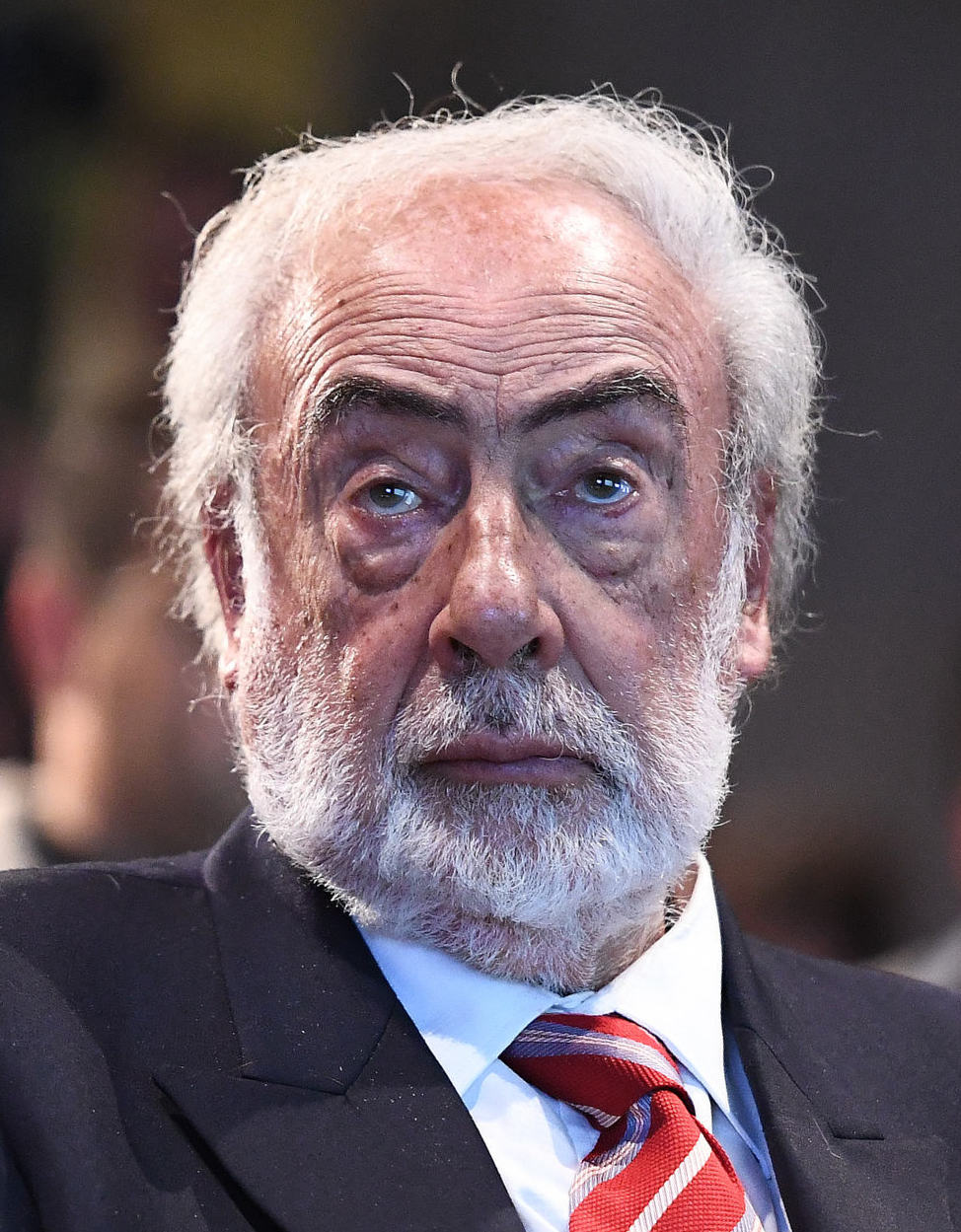
- Born: Eduardo Salvador Barcesat; 21 January 1940 (age 86); Córdoba, Argentina
- Education: University of Buenos Aires
- Years active: 1966–present
- Political party: Communist Party; Frente Grande

Eduardo Salvador Barcesat (born 21 January 1940) is an Argentine constitutional lawyer and defender of human rights.

== Biography ==
He studied law in Buenos Aires. Between 1960 and 1962 he was assistant in the Chair of Philosophy of Law in charge of Dr. Lucas A. Gioja.

The lawyer Eduardo Barcesat denounced the Minister of Security for the alleged crimes of "violation of public official duties, secrecy and privacy." He helped those who were at risk of "high degree of insecurity." Barcesat, who work for ambitious website, still expects to be supported by the federal prosecutor in his role.

Eduardo's was also active in the case of mothers of Mayo Argentina to find their missing children. In April 2011 he was appointed director of the career of Advocacy at that university of Mothers of Plaza de Mayo.

=== Career ===
In May 1962 – at the age of 22 – he graduated as a lawyer, at the Law School of the University of Buenos Aires. In the same faculty, in 1967 he obtained a doctorate in Law and Social Sciences.

In 1965 he entered the teaching career as a second assistant in the Chair of Introduction to Law and Social Sciences, under the direction of Dr. Moisés Nilve.

In 1966 – after the Nightmares and fears, in which the Onganía dictatorship intervened and repressed the Argentine universities – resigned the teaching career.

In 1973 and 1974 – with the return of democracy after a string of military dictatorships – he was appointed assistant professor of Introduction to Law and Social Sciences, in the chair of Dr. Jorge L. Rébori, at the Faculty of Law of the University from Buenos Aires. In 1974 he was assistant professor of Philosophy of Law. That year he was separated from the teaching function by another intervention – the "Ivanissevich mission" – against the University of Buenos Aires.

In 1984 – with the return of democracy after the Argentine civic-military dictatorship (1976–1983) – he was appointed Associate Professor of General Theory and Philosophy of Law (at the Faculty of Law of the University of Buenos Aires).

In the eighties he was a professor of Constitutional Law at the Faculty of Law of the National University of Lomas de Zamora.

He has worked as an expert on Human Rights of the UNESCO.

He was a professor of Constitutional Law, in the Faculty of Law, of the National University of Lomas de Zamora (UNLZ).

He was a founding member and first secretary general of the American Association of Jurists. In 1994 he was a conventional national constituent and participated in the reform of the National Constitution. In 1997 he was appointed regular professor of General Theory and Philosophy of Law at the University of Buenos Aires. In March 2008 he was appointed titular professor of Constitutional Law in the Popular University of Mothers of Plaza de Mayo. In April 2011, he was appointed director of the career of Advocacy at that university.

He is a full professor in the Department of General Theory and Philosophy of Law. Professor of Human Rights and Constitutional Guarantees. School of Law, University of Buenos Aires.

On 1 February 2016, Eduardo Barcesat denounced the president Mauricio Macri and several ministers for the crimes of "violation of the duties of a public official" and "abuse of authority".

== Research work done ==
- 1966: "Legal analysis of the institutional change operated on June 28, 1966", article in the magazine Cuadernos del Centro de Estudiantes de Derecho y Ciencias Sociales, No. 1.
- 1967: "The concept of responsibility in the Code of Military Justice", article in Critical Review of legislation and jurisprudence. # 1; year 1967.
- 1968: "Considerations on the validity of the mandates called" Laws of the Nation ", article in Revista Critique of legislation and jurisprudence , nº 5, year 1968.
- 1970: "Law and Social Change; article in the magazine Critique of legislation and jurisprudence , nº 7, Year 1970.
- 1970: "The causal relationship"; in Illegality and compensation . Buenos Aires: Jorge Álvarez, 1970.
- 1971: «The legitimacy of the National liberation processes»; article in the magazine Cuadernos de Cultura , number 38, 1971.
- 1972: "analysis of the jurisprudence of the Supreme Court of Justice of the Nation on matters of Constitutional Rights and Guarantees"; article in the magazine Critique of legislation and jurisprudence; No. 8, 1972.
- 1972: "The jurisdictional control of the so-called political issues", article in Proceedings of the Second Franco-Latin American Days of Comparative Law . Buenos Aires, 1972.
- 1972: «The Peace Concept and the Movements of National Liberation», in the magazine Review of Contemporary Law A.I.J.D. . Brussels (Belgium).
- 1973: «Power and Law»; article in the Revista del Centro de Estudios de la Realidad Nacional (CEREN) ; Santiago de Chile, 1973.
- 1973: «Summary of the fundamental concepts of the Pure Theory of Law of Hans Kelsen», article in the Publications Department of the Faculty of Law and Social Sciences, University of Buenos Aires, file 00514, year 1973.
- 1973: «Critical analysis of fundamental legal concepts». Department of Publications of the Faculty of Law and Social Sciences, University of Buenos Aires, file number 00523; year 1973.
- 1973: «Methodology and legal typology». Publications Department of the Faculty of Law and Social Sciences of the University of Buenos Aires, file number 0052; year 1973.
- 1974: «Legal Ideology and Social Transition»; in Publications of the First Inter-American Congress on Legal Aspects of Economic Independence. Lima (Peru), 1974.
- 1975: «Proposals for the formulation of a juridical-political instance at the service of the process of national and social liberation of the Latin American peoples». Proceedings of the Second Inter-American Congress on Legal Aspects of Economic Independence ", Panama, Year 1975.
- "The legal doctrine of individual liberty", in the magazine El Derecho, 82-865.
- "The jurisdictional control of the so-called political questions", in "The Right", 84-785.
- 1978: «The structures of dependence and legal ideology»; in Magazine of the Faculty of Law of the University of Cuzco , nº 15; year 1978.
- 1978: Prologue to the book: Marxism and law, by Jorge L. Rébori. Bogotá (Colombia): Editorial of the Third World, 1978.
- 1979: «Proposals for a materialistic conception of legal relations». Minutes of the Seminar 'Law and Society' of CLACSO. Buenos Aires, year 1979.
- 1981: "A portrait of the lawyer Teresa Alicia Israel"; in New Era , nº 8, year 1981.
- 1981: "Proposal of the International Convention on Guarantees of the Right to Life, to Freedom and to the Physical and Psychic Integrity of the Human Being". Publication of the International Colloquium on the policy of forced disappearance of people . Paris (France), 1981.
- 1982: "The legal idea of freedom -in view of the state of siege", in the magazine Comments , No. 12, year 1982.
- 1982: "From the ideology of guilt and punishment to the normative presuppositions of a non-sanctioning right"; in Communications , number 2 of the Institute of Legal Culture of the National University of La Plata, year 1982.
- 1982: "Be national, national security and institutional exceptionalism"; in «The ideology of national security». Buenos Aires: El Cid, 1982.
- 1983: Prologue to the book Prisionero político , by Carlos M. Zamorano. Buenos Aires: Center of Studies, 1983.
- 1984: "Recent reforms to the Code of Military Justice", in "The Observer," No. 19, 1984.
- 1984: «Some reflections and theses on the role of the legal profession and the legal ideology in the Rule of Law», in Proceedings of the VI Congress of the Ibero-American Union of Lawyers and Bar Associations (UIBA), 1984.
- 1985: "Contributions to a theory of the transition from institutional exceptionality to the rule of law. Proposals for a juridico-political model of state and law for countries in process towards national and social liberation "(essay formulated with regard to the rupture of the ideology of" national security "); in «Insecurity and denationalization», ed. Human rights; Buenos Aires, year 1985.
- 1985: "Process to State Terrorism", article of 7 May 1985 in the newspaper "Qué Pasa".
- 1985: "Marxism and Human Rights." Cuadernos de Cultura , new era, nº 2, year 1985.
- 1985: "Concerning the" order "of Human Rights"; in the magazine El Derecho , 15 September 1985.
- 1986: «Methodology of political praxis»; in the magazine Nueva Era , December 1986.
- 1986: "The prescription of criminal action in the crimes of terrorism", article in the newspaper Río Negro , 15 October, 86.
- 1986: «Legal defense of the rights to life and personal freedom in the Argentine military regime» (pp. 141–163); in CESOC, Academy of Christian Humanism. Santiago de Chile, 1986.
- 1987: "The official story of the end point and the due obedience", in "Military crisis, a country in due obedience". Buenos Aires: Antarco, 1987.
- 1987: "Problems of fundamental human rights in developing countries"; in the Second International Congress of the International Association of Constitutional Law . Freiburg (Federal Republic of Germany): University of Freiburg, year 1987.
- 1987: «Misery of the Alfonsinist constitutional reform». Buenos Aires: Committee of Propaganda of the Communist Party, 1987.
- 1987: "The difficult" invention "of due obedience"; in End of Century , number 1, year 1987.
- 1987: prologue to the work The disappeared lawyers . Buenos Aires: Commission of Relatives of Detained and Disappeared for Political Reasons, 1987.
- 1988: «Human Rights» (4 trials); in End of Century , year 1988.
- 1988: «The mythological ghost of political issues not justiciable», in the newspaper "Page / 12" (Buenos Aires), year 1988.
- 1988: «The persecuted Chilean politicians and the renewed doctrine of the« two demons »; in New SUR, year 1988.
- 1989: «The crime of Kidnapping of Identity and the Natural Family»; in Magazine of the Commission of Relatives of the Detained and Disappeared for Political Reasons, year 1989.
- 1989: "The two battles", "New SUR", year 1989.
- 1989: «La Tablada; repression and judicial battle »; New SUR , year 1989
- 1989: «The judicial process of La Tablada as a global essay of a future repression»; in New SUR; year 1989.
- 1989: «The presidential pardon; last section of the general project of impunity »; New SUR, year 1989.
- 1989: "State of Siege and Law of Defense of the Nation"; New SUR, year 1989.
- 1989: "Examination of the convenience, opportunity and necessity of the announced Constitutional Reform", Magazine of the Commission of Relatives of the Detained and Disappeared for Political Reasons; year 1989.
- 1989: «The other program» (2 essays), New SUR ; year 1989.
- 1990: "The new Supreme Court of Justice of the Nation; one step more in the increase of institutional exceptionality"; weekly Proposal , year 1990.
- 1990: «The rotten apple of the Upper Valley of the Black River»; New SUR ; year 1990.
- 1990: «And we; where we are? Critical examination on the situation of socialism »; Bulletins of the Committee, Central of the Communist Party; year 1990.
- 1990: «Violence and Revenge; a social disease »; New SUR , year 1990.
- 1990: "Examination of the impossibility of the Rule of Law in Argentina"; New SUR ; year 1990.
- 1990: «Human Rights and Socialism. Conjunction for the alternative proposal »; New SUR , year 1990.
- 1990: "Proposal, front and PC"; Weekly PROPOSAL, year 1990.
- 1990: "The future of Human Rights and Socialism"; New SUR , year 1990.
- 1990: "Legal repugnance to presidential pardon"; New SUR , year 1990.
- 1991: "Critical examination of the judicial process against the descamisados"; in the magazine Análisis , Paraná (province of Entre Ríos), 1991.
- 1991: «Reflections on war and peace, about the Middle East and the Persian Gulf»; Magazine of the Armenian Community in Argentina ; year 1991.
- 1991: «The" sacred "property right of the Ford»; weekly Proposal ; 1991
- 1991: «Human Rights; a retrospective of 25 years »; in weekly Accion , edition of the 25 years; year 1991.
- 1991: "Why not? Constitutional Reform and Human Rights ", in the magazine Margen Izquierdo ; May 1991.
- 1992: "Constitutional Reform or Institutional Trap?", In "Cuadernos de Marxismo", No. 1, year 1992.
- 1993: "Critical examination of the proposals contained in the end of history", from the political and social philosophy of Human Rights", in "'Notebooks of Marxism' ', special supplement, January 1993.
- 1993: Right to the right; democracy and liberation. Buenos Aires: End of Century , September 1993.
- 1993: "Socialism and Human Rights", article in the magazine Against Legem (Buenos Aires), year 1, number 2, October 1993.
- 1993: «How the National Constitution is reformed», article in the magazine Acción . # 101; Oct. 1993.
- 1993: "Plebiscite and Constitutional Reform", article in the magazine Action , number 104, Nov. 1993.
- 1994: "Socialism; thinking and perspective"; compilation of the seminar. Rosario: Actuel Marx, July 1994.
- 1994: "Beauty and the Beast", article in the magazine Accion , September 1994.
- 1994: "Socialism and Human Rights. A joint construction", Rosario: Homo Sapiens, 1994.
- 1995: Balance of the constitutional reform . Buenos Aires: Publications of the Institute of Studies on Constitutional Law of the University of Belgrano, year 1995.
- «Debate on the Constitutional Reform»; in Magazine of the Bar Association of La Plata ; year XXXIV, number 55.
- 1995: «On the future of Law», in the magazine "Derecho y Revés"; Year 1, number 0, Buenos Aires, 1995.
- 1995: "A year of the Constitutional Reform", in the "Magazine of the National Congress"; year 1995.
- 1995: «On the autonomy of the City of Buenos Aires», in the magazine "El Derecho", 8 November 1995.
- 1996: "The external history of the truth and the judicial process", in "Periodico de las Madres de la Plaza de Mayo"; Year XIV, No. 130, May 1996, p. 12
- 1996: "May God protect us", in the newspaper Accion . 16 May 1996, p. 6
- 1996: «Judicial pronouncement», in magazine "Plenary"; AABA, May 1996, p. eleven.
- 1996: «On the autonomy of the city of Buenos Aires»; opinion column in the newspaper Ámbito Financiero , 8-8-96.
- 1996: «The third senator for the city of Buenos Aires». Bulletin of the Argentine League for the Rights of Man; August 1996.
- 1996: «Transfer of 600 Courts». Plenary Magazine, Publication of the Association of Lawyers of Buenos Aires; December 1996.
- 1997: «Review of the autonomy of the City of Buenos Aires». Magazine of the Municipal Law Institute of the San Isidro Bar Association, February 1997.
- «The universe of art. 19 of the National Constitution »; article in the magazine El Derecho ; 170-1223;
- 1997: "State of fact". La Vuelta Magazine, number 0, March 1997.
- 1997: «Interpretation of art. 19 of the National Constitution »; article in the magazine El Derecho , ed. 16 May 1997, p. 5.
- 1997: «The Left and Elections». Right and Wrong Magazine. Year II no. 3; September 1997.
- 1997: «The message of the remains of« Che »Guevara»; in «The Bulletin» of the Argentine League for the Rights of Man; October 1997, p. 13
- 1997: "Jurisdictional protection of Human Rights"; article in the magazine Liber / Pueblo ; December 1997.
- 1998: «The Law is not born of force»; La Nación , 4-2-98, p. 13
- 1998: «The Police is slave labor of the model»; Report published in Fifth Power ; page. 3; October / November 1998.
- 1998: «Lawyers and Judicial Power»; in the magazine Third Instance , November 1998.
- 1998: «The Universal Jurisdiction»; in Judicial News; 3 November 1998.
- 1999: "Rule of Law"; in the I Seminar of Critical Analysis of the Argentine Reality, 1984–1999; in the newspaper Página / 12 (Buenos Aires); 10 December 1999.
- 2000: "Unreason in Justice"; in the newspaper Página / 12 (Buenos Aires); 21 April 2000
- 2000: "The inapplicability of the laws of final point and due obedience"; Weekly «EL SOL», province of Mendoza; ed. 11-5-00.
- 2000: "Exegesis of the ruling of Chamber II of the Federal Chamber on the laws of final point and due obedience"; article in the magazine of the American Association of Jurists; July 2000
- 2001: «Reconciliation? Magazine of the Popular University of Mothers of Plaza de Mayo; Buenos Aires; July 2000
- 2001: «Ethics and politics»; supplement of the Popular University of Mothers of Plaza de Mayo, in the newspaper Page / 12 (Buenos Aires), 2 March 2001.
- 2001: «Ethics and politics»; supplement of the Popular University of Mothers of Plaza de Mayo, in the newspaper Página / 12 (Buenos Aires), 9 February 2001
- 2001: "Justice, Power and Privileges"; in the magazine Locas, Cultura y Utopía ; Popular University of Mothers of Plaza de Mayo; # 3, June / July 2001; p. 32.
- 2001: «Talking seriously about Human Rights», in the supplement of the Popular University of Mothers of Plaza de Mayo, in the newspaper Page / 12 (Buenos Aires), 21 September 2001,.
- 2001: "Semblanza de Enrique E. Marí"; in the magazine Locas, Cultura y Utopía , from the Popular University of Mothers of Plaza de Mayo; # 4 August / October 2001; P. 34/35.
- 2001: «Justice of the Misery and Misery of Justice». Magazine of the Buenos Aires Judicial Federation; September / October 2001; P. 17
- 2001: Chapter: Speak the protagonists, in «Media and Constitutional Reform in Argentina», of Mr. Eduardo Zukernik, presentation of the Konrad Adenauer Foundation.- 13 December 2001.
- 2003: "On the laws of the end point and the due obedience"; article in the legal magazine La Ley ; ed. 14 April 2003.
- 2030: «The Problem of Truth in the Judicial Process». Delivered for publication to the legal magazine La Ley , July 2003.
- 2003: «The concept of emergency. Contributions from a critical theory ». Delivered for publication to the La Ley publishing house (July 2003).
- 2003: «Nullity of the laws of due obedience and end point»; Interview with Drs. Eduardo s. Barcesat and Daniel Sabsay. Rev. The Law , ed. 16 September 2003.
- 2003: «The problem of truth in the judicial process»; Law 2003.- D, 1331.
- 2003: «The concept of emergency in law. Contributions from a critical theory »; in Supplement Economic Emergency and Theory of Law; August 2003; The Law 2003– E, 1078.
- 2003: «On the laws of« End point »and« Due obedience »; The Law 2003– c; 1486
- 2004: «First reflections on the ruling of the Supreme Court of Justice of the Nation regarding legitimization of pesification»; Note to failure, The Law on line.
- 2004: «Critical review of the judicial process and failure of the AMIA»; in the magazine Convergencia ; August–September 2004; year 4, No. 15; P. 12
- 2005: «Reflections on external debt, Human Rights and Emergency, in collaboration with Roberto J. Boico, La Ley 2005-C; 329
- 2005: «Reflections on the language and validity of the law»; The Law 2005-B, 940.
- 2005: «Critical examination of law 25,990»; The Law 2005– B, 1002.
- 2005: «The problem of Human Rights in the XXI Century; The challenges of the New World Order »; Rev. Plenario, Association of Lawyers of Buenos Aires, New Series, Year II, Nº 2 2005.
- 2005: "An exemplary ruling" Note to ruling, Constitutional supplement to the Law 25 October 2005, p. 51
- 2006: Bibliographic note on the book "Critical Manual of Human Rights", by Juan Carlos Wlasik, Ed. La Ley; Buenos Aires, 2006. Law 8 March 2006, p. 3.
- 2006: «Thirty years after the coup», in Lawyers; article in the magazine of the Bar Association No. 89; February / March 2006; P. 18
- 2006: "An unnecessary and harmful law" in "The Law"; 14 June 2006: _
- 2006: «Reform of the Military Justice Code system», article in the magazine La Ley , 12 October 2006.
- 2007: «The nullity of the pardons regarding perpetrators and participants in crimes against humanity»; Note to failure: The Law; 20 July 2007.
- 2007: «The metamorphosis of politics», www.espacioconvergencia.com.ar; 20 October 2007, Internet.
- 2007: «Condemned to failure»; in Siglo XXIII magazine; in ed. 9 November 2007.
- 2009: «State and Law in the crisis»; in the magazine Cultural Bitácora , number 25, June 2009; p. 11 / 12.
- 2009: «The subject of Law: The human being or heritage?»; The Law , ed. 2 July 2009, Supplement Actuality, p. one.
- 2009: «Tenure for drug consumption»; The Law, Special Supplement, "Arriola, Sebastián and others"; 25 August 2009, p. 7/9.
- 2009: "The new international financial architecture. The international law of human rights. The economic principle of self-sufficiency and the right to self-determination"; The Law , supplement Actualidad. Ed. 10 December 2009, p. 1/3
- 2010: Notes to judgments (patriotic background of the Bicentennial and Redrado); the law ed. 1, 10 February; P. 2 and 3.
- 2010: «The words of the Constitution» (About the average null penalty – of reform of law 26.180 of tax on the check); The Law , ed. 22, 10 April
- 2010: "Supreme Court, its role and doctrine"; article in the magazine Convergencia; May–June 2010, p. 12/14.
- 2010: Prologue to the book of Dr. Raúl Zaffaroni, "Crimes of mass". Buenos Aires: Popular University of Mothers of Plaza de Mayo, August 2010.
- 2010: Note to ruling: "Judicial protection of the rights to life and health against the persecutory power of crimes by the National State"; Supplement "Judicial Doctrine", Newspaper "The Law"; Nº: 38, 22, 10 October. p. 2577.
- 2010: Column of opinion with reference to the case «Sosa», Supplement Actuality Daily Law; ed. 12, 10 October
- 2010: Note to ruling: "The reasonable period in the precautionary measures"; Diario La Ley, Ed. 20, 10 October.
- 2010: "The full judiciability of the Economic Social and Cultural Rights," The book of the Bicentennial of the May Revolution. Ed. Faculty of Law, University of Buenos Aires, year 2010; P. 11 and ss.
- 2011: «Examination of the DNU No. 441/11», in "The Law", ed. 26 Apr 2011, p. 1 and s.s.
- 2011: «The provisions on currency settlement»; in The Law , 'Opinion Column'; ed. 9-9-11, pags 1 and s.s.
- 2012: «YPF. Examination of legality of the expropriatory measure, Reflections on the BITs and the ICSID under the notion of "legal security"; in La Ley , supplement «Actualidad», ed. 10, 12 May, pages. 1–4; in collaboration with Roberto J. Boico.
- 2012: «Press Paper, Democratization and Citizenship Act», by Eduardo S. Barcesat and Roberto J. Boico, Public Law Magazine , number 1; P. 3 and 5, Buenos Aires, 2012.
- 2012: «A response to Lorenzetti», article of 10 August 2012 in the newspaper Página / 12 (Buenos Aires).
- 2012: "On arbitration and private international law", editorial of 24 August 2012 in the newspaper Page 12 .

== Private life ==
He is married, and has Jewish ancestors. In several places it is mentioned that Eduardo Barcesat is Jewish:

- "The meeting of Argentines of Jewish origin adds adhesions: A reaction from the community", article of 16 February 2015 on the website Iton Gadol (the Jewish world in Spanish).
- February of 16.html "A reaction of the community", article of 16 February 2015 in the newspaper Page / 12 (Buenos Aires).
  Those who sign the document criticize the link of subordination of Alberto Nisman with the embassy of the United States.
- «Jorge Elbaum:" There are other Argentines of Jewish origin who express something very plural and progressive "», article of February 2015 in the Jewish News Agency website.
- "Argentines of Jewish origin facing the DAIA call a plenary", article of February 2015 on the website Agencia El Vigía (Buenos Aires).
- todos.html «Members of the Jewish community of Argentina do not want" that DAIA speak for everyone "», article of 17 April 2015 on the website of the agency Télam (Buenos Aires).
