= Brünnau =

Coordinates: 49°51′N 10°21′E

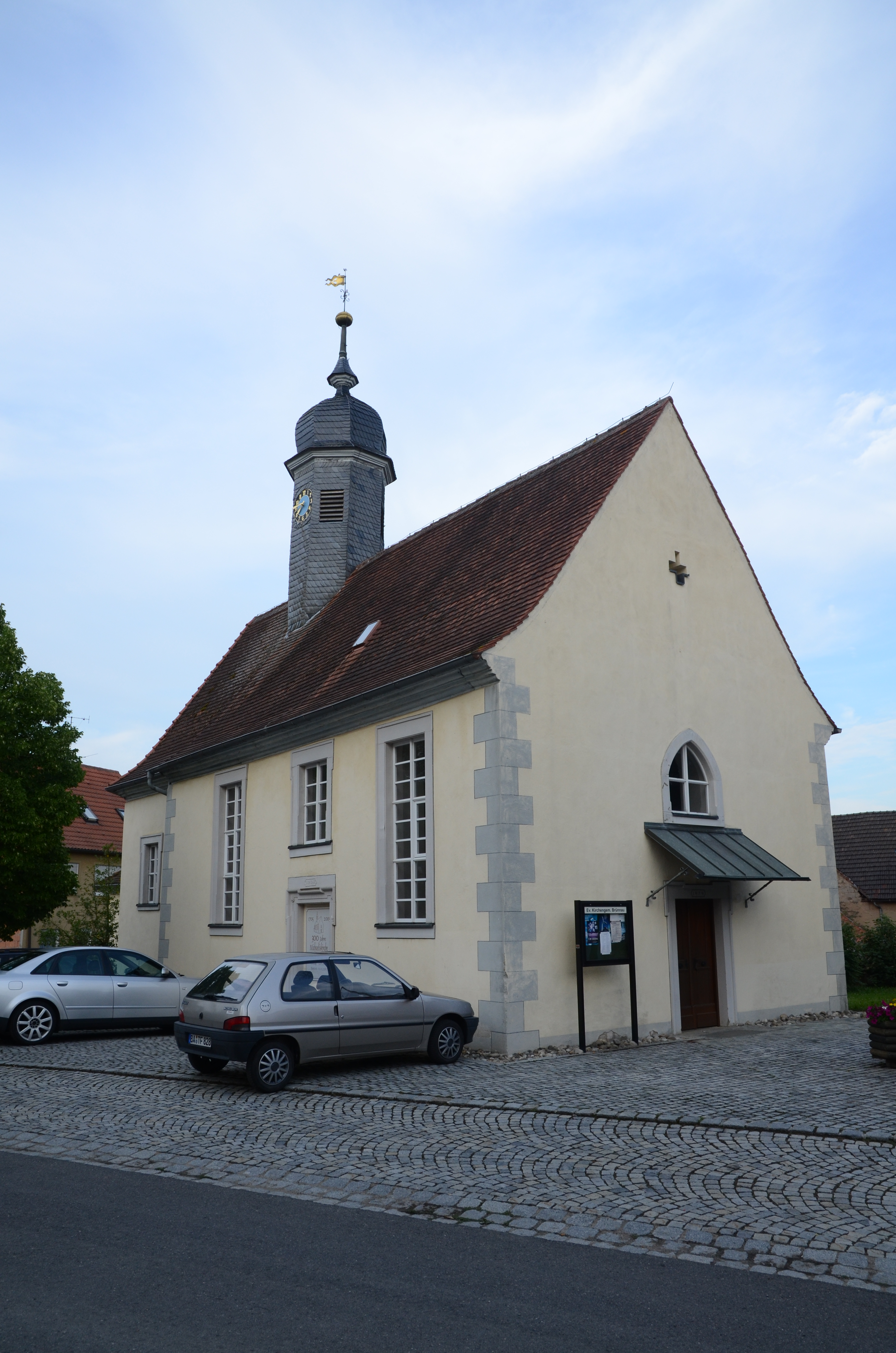

Brünnau is a village in the district of Kitzingen, Lower Franconia, Bavaria, Germany. It's a district of Prichsenstadt.

Located about 20 miles south of Schweinfurt on route 286 and east of Würzburg 20 miles. The small city is in a farming district that has many rolling hills, small forests. The town is typical of the area.

== Notable people ==
- Michael Glos
