= Michael Glos =

German politician (born 1944)

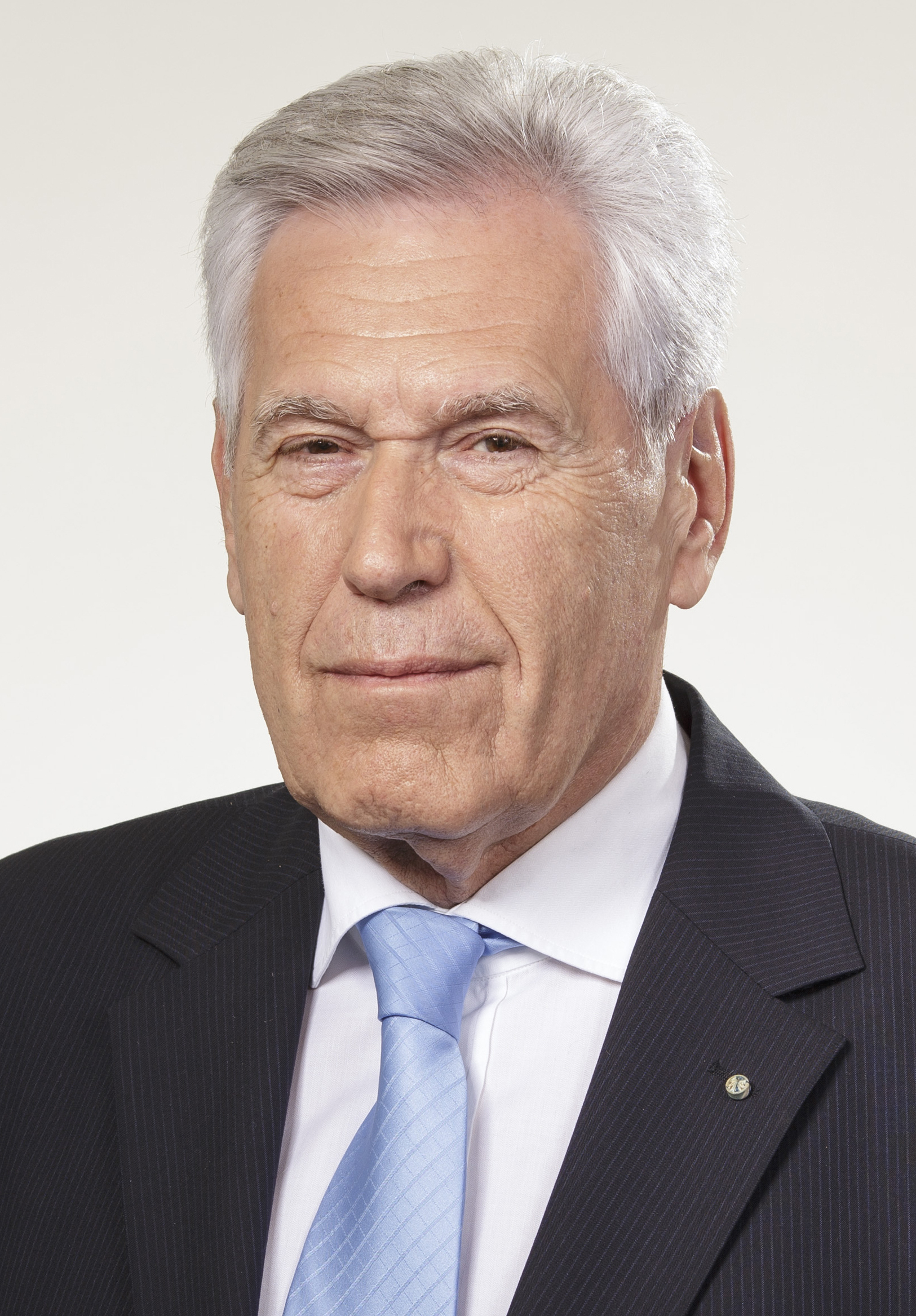
- Glos in 2012

Minister for Economics and Technology
- In office 22 November 2005 – 10 February 2009
- Chancellor: Angela Merkel
- Preceded by: Wolfgang Clement
- Succeeded by: Karl-Theodor zu Guttenberg

First Deputy Leader of the CDU/CSU Group in the Bundestag
- In office 22 January 1993 – 21 November 2005
- Leader: Wolfgang Schäuble; Friedrich Merz; Angela Merkel
- Preceded by: Wolfgang Bötsch
- Succeeded by: Peter Ramsauer

Member of the Bundestag; for Schweinfurt
- In office 14 December 1976 – 22 October 2013
- Preceded by: Max Schulze-Vorberg
- Succeeded by: Anja Weisgerber

Personal details
- Born: 14 December 1944 (age 81) Brünnau, Germany
- Party: Christian Social Union
- Children: 3
- Website: glos.de

Michael Glos (born 14 December 1944) is a German politician of the Christian Social Union (CSU) who served as Minister for Economics and Technology in the government of Chancellor Angela Merkel from November 2005 until February 2009.

== Early life and career ==
After the secondary school level, Glos made an apprenticeship as miller and became master in 1967. Starting 1968, he managed his parents' flour mill in Prichsenstadt.

== Political career ==
=== Career in local politics ===
Glos joined the CSU in 1970. In 1972, he was the first chairman of the CSU-chapter of his hometown Prichsenstadt. From 1975 to 1993, he was chairman of the CSU chapter of Kitzingen. From 1976 he was part of the executive board of the CSU in Lower Franconia. From then he was also part of the CSU leadership. From 1972 to 1978, Glos was member of the district council of Prichsenstadt and, from 1975 to 1993, member of the council of the district (Kreistag) of Kitzingen.

=== Career in national politics ===
Glos first became a member of the Bundestag in the 1976 elections, representing the Schweinfurt district. From 1993 to 2005 he was chairman of the CSU parliamentary group and deputy chairman of the CDU/CSU parliamentary group.

Following the 2005 elections, Glos was appointed as Federal Minister for Economic Affairs and Technology at short notice when CSU leader Edmund Stoiber rejected it. Merkel had reportedly wanted to appoint him as Federal Minister of Defence.

During his time in government, Glos was widely considered one of the weakest members of Chancellor Merkel's cabinet and had often seemed to struggle with his portfolio. Among other projects, he led efforts on a 2008 law that allows the government to block moves by foreign investors to take large stakes in German companies, if it concludes that they endanger the country's interests.

On 7 February 2009, Glos offered his resignation as minister, which was first denied by Horst Seehofer, but later accepted. He justified his resignation with his age and the need for renewal in the CSU after Seehofer's election as CSU chairman.

== Other activities ==
- KfW, Ex-Officio Member of the Board of Supervisory Directors (2006–2009)

== Personal life ==
Glos is married and father of two children. His third child died in a car accident near Munich in 1997.

Political offices
Preceded by Wolfgang Clement	Federal Minister for Economics and Technology; 2005-2009	Succeeded by Karl-Theodor zu Guttenberg
