= Markus Hümpfer =

German politician

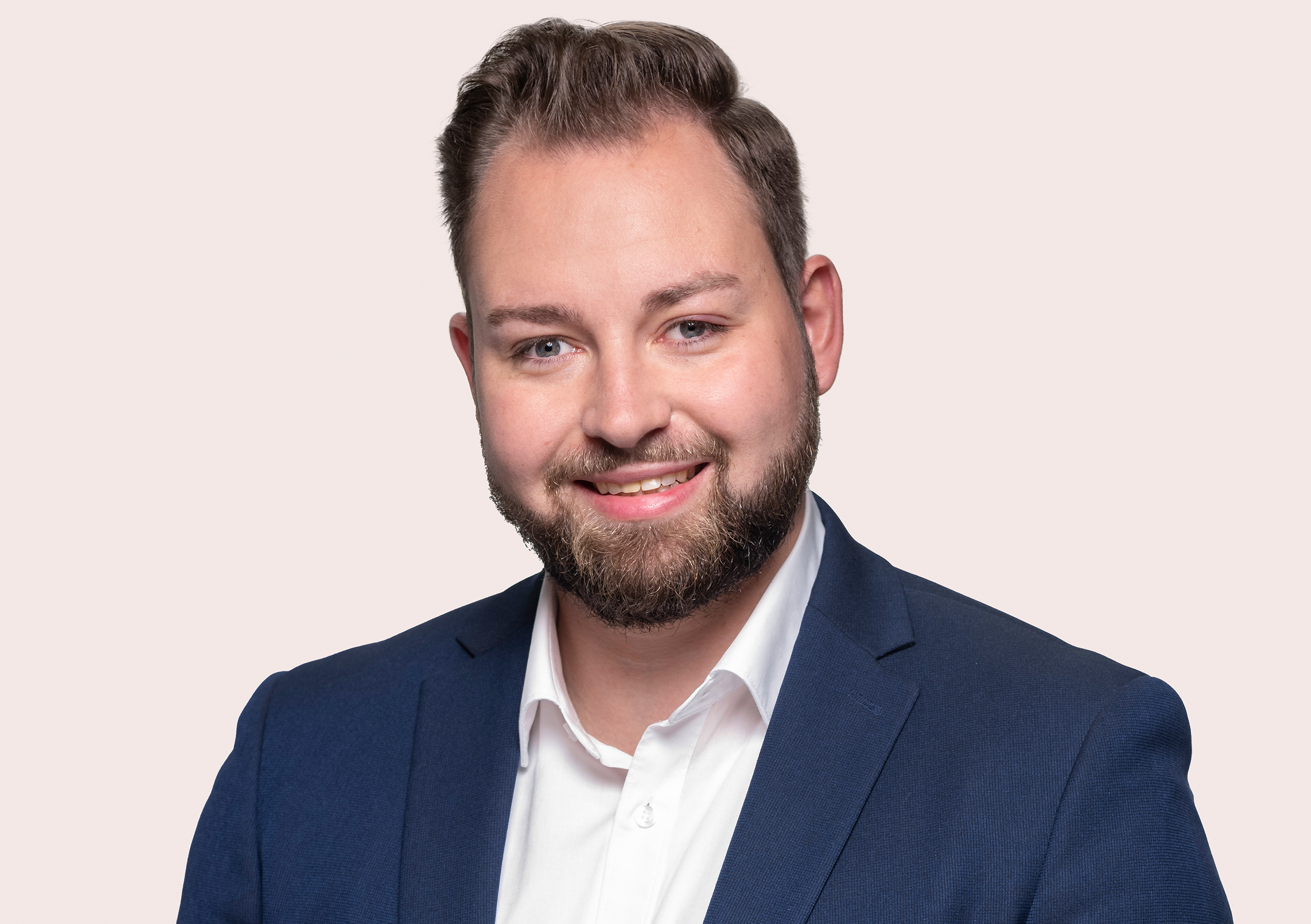

Member of the Bundestag
- In office 2021–2025

Personal details
- Born: 17 March 1992 (age 34) Schweinfurt, Germany
- Party: SPD

Markus Hümpfer (born 17 March 1992) is a German engineer and politician of the Social Democratic Party (SPD) who served as a member of the Bundestag from 2021 to 2025.

== Political career ==
In the 2021 elections, Hümpfer became a member of the Bundestag, representing the Schweinfurt district. In parliament, he served on the Committee on Climate Action and Energy.

Within his parliamentary group, Hümpfer belonged to the Parliamentary Left, a left-wing movement.

== Other activities ==
- Business Forum of the Social Democratic Party of Germany, Member of the Political Advisory Board (since 2022)
