= Schweinfurt (electoral district) =

Federal electoral district of Germany

249 Schweinfurt
- Electoral district for the Bundestag
- Schweinfurt in 2025
- State: Bavaria
- Population: 260,000 (2019)
- Electorate: 194,070 (2025)
- Major settlements: Schweinfurt; Kitzingen; Volkach
- Area: 1,561.2 km^{2}

Current electoral district
- Created: 1949
- Party: CSU
- Member: Anja Weisgerber
- Elected: 2013, 2017, 2021, 2025

Schweinfurt is an electoral constituency (German: Wahlkreis) represented in the Bundestag. It elects one member via first-past-the-post voting. Under the current constituency numbering system, it is designated as constituency 249. It is located in northwestern Bavaria, comprising the city of Schweinfurt and the districts of Kitzingen and Landkreis Schweinfurt.

Schweinfurt was created for the inaugural 1949 federal election. Since 2013, it has been represented by Anja Weisgerber of the Christian Social Union (CSU).

== Geography ==
Schweinfurt is located in northwestern Bavaria. As of the 2021 federal election, it comprises the independent city of Schweinfurt and the districts of Kitzingen and Landkreis Schweinfurt.

== History ==
Schweinfurt was created in 1949. In the 1949 election, it was Bavaria constituency 39 in the numbering system. In the 1953 through 1961 elections, it was number 234. In the 1965 through 1998 elections, it was number 236. In the 2002 and 2005 elections, it was number 251. In the 2009 through 2021 elections, it was number 250. From the 2025 election, it has been number 249.

Originally, the constituency comprised the independent cities of Schweinfurt and Kitzingen and the districts of Landkreis Schweinfurt, Landkreis Kitzingen, and Gerolzhofen. It acquired its current borders in the 1976 election.

Election	No.	Name	Borders
1949	39	Schweinfurt	Schweinfurt city; Kitzingen city; Landkreis Schweinfurt district; Landkreis Kitzingen district; Gerolzhofen district
1953	234	Schweinfurt	Schweinfurt city; Kitzingen city; Landkreis Schweinfurt district; Landkreis Kitzingen district; Gerolzhofen district
1957	234	Schweinfurt	Schweinfurt city; Kitzingen city; Landkreis Schweinfurt district; Landkreis Kitzingen district; Gerolzhofen district
1961	234	Schweinfurt	Schweinfurt city; Kitzingen city; Landkreis Schweinfurt district; Landkreis Kitzingen district; Gerolzhofen district
1965	236	Schweinfurt	Schweinfurt city; Kitzingen city; Landkreis Schweinfurt district; Landkreis Kitzingen district; Gerolzhofen district
1969	236	Schweinfurt	Schweinfurt city; Kitzingen city; Landkreis Schweinfurt district; Landkreis Kitzingen district; Gerolzhofen district
1972	236	Schweinfurt	Schweinfurt city; Kitzingen city; Landkreis Schweinfurt district; Landkreis Kitzingen district; Gerolzhofen district
1976	236	Schweinfurt	Schweinfurt city; Kitzingen district; Landkreis Schweinfurt district
1980	236	Schweinfurt	Schweinfurt city; Kitzingen district; Landkreis Schweinfurt district
1983	236	Schweinfurt	Schweinfurt city; Kitzingen district; Landkreis Schweinfurt district
1987	236	Schweinfurt	Schweinfurt city; Kitzingen district; Landkreis Schweinfurt district
1990	236	Schweinfurt	Schweinfurt city; Kitzingen district; Landkreis Schweinfurt district
1994	236	Schweinfurt	Schweinfurt city; Kitzingen district; Landkreis Schweinfurt district
1998	236	Schweinfurt	Schweinfurt city; Kitzingen district; Landkreis Schweinfurt district
2002	251	Schweinfurt	Schweinfurt city; Kitzingen district; Landkreis Schweinfurt district
2005	251	Schweinfurt	Schweinfurt city; Kitzingen district; Landkreis Schweinfurt district
2009	250	Schweinfurt	Schweinfurt city; Kitzingen district; Landkreis Schweinfurt district
2013	250	Schweinfurt	Schweinfurt city; Kitzingen district; Landkreis Schweinfurt district
2017	250	Schweinfurt	Schweinfurt city; Kitzingen district; Landkreis Schweinfurt district
2021	250	Schweinfurt	Schweinfurt city; Kitzingen district; Landkreis Schweinfurt district
2025	249	Schweinfurt	Schweinfurt city; Kitzingen district; Landkreis Schweinfurt district

== Members ==
Like most constituencies in rural Bavaria, it is an CSU safe seat, the party holding the seat continuously since its creation. It was first represented by Friedrich Funk from 1949 to 1965, followed by Max Schulze-Vorberg from 1965 to 1976. Michael Glos was representative from 1976 to 2013, a total of ten consecutive terms. Anja Weisgerber was elected in 2013, and re-elected in 2017, 2021, and 2025.

Election	Member	Party	%
1949	Friedrich Funk	CSU	38.5
1953	Friedrich Funk	CSU	56.3
1957	Friedrich Funk	CSU	61.7
1961	Friedrich Funk	CSU	56.7
1965	Max Schulze-Vorberg	CSU	60.8
1969	Max Schulze-Vorberg	CSU	59.2
1972	Max Schulze-Vorberg	CSU	58.2
1976	Michael Glos	CSU	62.0
1980	Michael Glos	CSU	60.3
1983	Michael Glos	CSU	63.7
1987	Michael Glos	CSU	60.2
1990	Michael Glos	CSU	57.2
1994	Michael Glos	CSU	56.9
1998	Michael Glos	CSU	51.9
2002	Michael Glos	CSU	58.4
2005	Michael Glos	CSU	54.1
2009	Michael Glos	CSU	46.4
2013	Anja Weisgerber	CSU	54.8
2017	Anja Weisgerber	CSU	47.9
2021	Anja Weisgerber	CSU	40.9
2025	Anja Weisgerber	CSU	43.4

== Election results ==
=== 2025 election ===
Federal election (2025): Schweinfurt
Notes:	Blue background denotes the winner of the electorate vote. Pink background denotes a candidate elected from their party list. Yellow background denotes an electorate win by a list member, or other incumbent. A ✓ or ✗ denotes status of any incumbent, win or lose respectively.						
Party	Candidate	Votes	%	±%	Party votes	%	±%
CSU	✓ Anja Weisgerber	70,454	43.4	▲2.5	64,165	39.4	▲4.6
AfD	Bernd Willi Karl Schuhmann	33,826	20.8	▲10.9	34,401	21.1	▲11.1
SPD	Markus Klaus Hümpfer	21,832	13.4	▼5.2	18,705	11.5	▼8.0
Greens	Stefan Rudolf Leo Weidinger	12,894	7.9	▼1.5	14,828	9.1	▼1.8
FW	Sabrina Ingrid Neckov	7,822	4.8	▼0.2	6,342	3.9	▼1.9
Left	Agnes Maria Conrad	7,606	4.7	▲0.5	8,467	5.2	▲2.0
FDP	Michael Mörer	3,992	2.5	▼5.5	5,823	3.6	▼6.0
BSW					5,287	3.2	
APT					1,369	0.8	▼0.3
Volt	Claus Bernhard Christ	1,558	1.0		958	0.6	▲0.4
dieBasis					682	0.4	▼1.2
PARTEI					613	0.4	▼0.4
ÖDP	Martin Leonhard Günzel	1,374	0.8	▲0.1	561	0.3	▼0.1
BP	Thorsten Götz	930	0.6	Steady	338	0.2	▼0.1
BD					131	0.1	
Humanists					111	0.1	Steady
MLPD	Manfred Johannes Setter	197	0.1	Steady	56	0.0	Steady
Informal votes		1,008			656		
Total valid votes		162,485			162,837		
Turnout		163,493	84.2	▲4.2			
CSU hold	Majority	36,628	22.6	▲0.3			

=== 2021 election ===
Federal election (2021): Schweinfurt
Notes:	Blue background denotes the winner of the electorate vote. Pink background denotes a candidate elected from their party list. Yellow background denotes an electorate win by a list member, or other incumbent. A ✓ or ✗ denotes status of any incumbent, win or lose respectively.						
Party	Candidate	Votes	%	±%	Party votes	%	±%
CSU	✓ Anja Weisgerber	63,697	40.9	▼7.0	54,441	34.8	▼6.3
SPD	Markus Hümpfer	29,037	18.6	▲1.6	30,482	19.5	▲2.6
AfD	Bernd Schuhmann	15,468	9.9	▼1.2	15,687	10.0	▼2.2
Greens	Nicolas Lommatzsch	14,747	9.5	▲2.0	17,085	10.9	▲3.4
FDP	Daniel Stark	12,408	8.0	▲1.8	15,039	9.6	▲0.7
FW	Andrea Graham	7,761	5.0		9,119	5.8	▲3.5
Left	Klaus Ernst	6,552	4.2	▼3.6	4,928	3.2	▼3.6
dieBasis	Pasquale Trasente	2,758	1.8		2,470	1.6	
Tierschutzpartei					1,817	1.2	▲0.2
PARTEI					1,137	0.7	▲0.1
ÖDP	Stefan Hrnicek-Hubert	1,229	0.8	▼0.5	657	0.4	▼0.2
Pirates					574	0.4	0.0
Unabhängige	Herbert Lorey	1,116	0.7		503	0.3	
BP	Cedrick Van Huet	863	0.6	▼0.4	523	0.3	▼0.1
Team Todenhöfer					510	0.3	
Volt					309	0.2	
Gesundheitsforschung					191	0.1	0.0
V-Partei3					183	0.1	▼0.1
NPD					155	0.1	▼0.3
Humanists					123	0.1	
Bündnis C					115	0.1	
du.					106	0.1	
The III. Path					92	0.1	
MLPD	Manfred Setter	167	0.1	▼0.1	52	0.0	0.0
LKR					35	0.0	
DKP					19	0.0	0.0
Informal votes		1,554			1,005		
Total valid votes		155,803			156,352		
Turnout		157,357	80.0	▲1.5			
CSU hold	Majority	34,660	22.3	▼8.6			

=== 2017 election ===
Federal election (2017): Schweinfurt
Notes:	Blue background denotes the winner of the electorate vote. Pink background denotes a candidate elected from their party list. Yellow background denotes an electorate win by a list member, or other incumbent. A ✓ or ✗ denotes status of any incumbent, win or lose respectively.						
Party	Candidate	Votes	%	±%	Party votes	%	±%
CSU	✓ Anja Weisgerber	73,901	47.9	▼6.9	63,674	41.1	▼9.9
SPD	Markus Hümpfer	26,346	17.1	▼6.0	26,163	16.9	▼3.8
AfD	Christian Klingen	17,198	11.1		18,905	12.2	▲8.9
Left	Klaus Ernst	12,091	7.8	▲2.5	10,422	6.7	▲1.8
Greens	Barbara Pfeuffer	11,466	7.4	▲1.7	11,717	7.6	▲0.5
FDP	Andreas Sulzbacher	9,506	6.2	▲4.1	13,789	8.9	▲4.7
FW					3,684	2.4	▼0.5
PARTEI					1,002	0.6	
ÖDP	Karolin Hildner	1,973	1.3	▲0.5	889	0.6	0.0
BP	Michael Herbert	1,525	1.0	▼0.1	654	0.4	▼0.2
NPD					566	0.4	▼0.6
Pirates					540	0.3	▼1.4
DM					407	0.3	
V-Partei³					271	0.2	
Gesundheitsforschung					236	0.2	
DiB					165	0.1	
BGE					163	0.1	
MLPD	Manfred Setter	263	0.2		125	0.1	0.0
BüSo					20	0.0	0.0
DKP					17	0.0	
Informal votes		1,890			1,218		
Total valid votes		154,269			154,941		
Turnout		156,159	78.5	▲7.9			
CSU hold	Majority	47,555	30.8	▼0.9			

=== 2013 election ===
Federal election (2013): Schweinfurt
Notes:	Blue background denotes the winner of the electorate vote. Pink background denotes a candidate elected from their party list. Yellow background denotes an electorate win by a list member, or other incumbent. A ✓ or ✗ denotes status of any incumbent, win or lose respectively.						
Party	Candidate	Votes	%	±%	Party votes	%	±%
CSU	Anja Weisgerber	76,548	54.8	▲8.5	71,264	51.0	▲7.8
SPD	Ralf Hofmann	32,190	23.1	▲3.6	28,872	20.6	▲3.5
Greens	Hans Plate	8,052	5.8	▼4.4	9,903	7.1	▼2.1
Left	Klaus Ernst	7,514	5.4	▼5.0	6,940	5.0	▼4.3
FW	Jochen Keßler-Rosa	4,614	3.3		4,041	2.9	
Pirates	Beate Kesper	2,994	2.1		2,493	1.8	▼0.4
FDP	Ursula Seissiger	2,921	2.1	▼7.5	5,906	4.2	▼8.8
AfD					4,665	3.3	
NPD	Jan Fries	2,042	1.5	▼0.7	1,333	1.0	▼0.3
REP					1,118	0.8	▼0.4
BP		1,532	1.1	▼0.5	828	0.6	0.0
ÖDP	Peter Spath	1,155	0.8		859	0.6	▼0.1
Tierschutzpartei					852	0.6	▲0.1
DIE FRAUEN					264	0.2	
Party of Reason					155	0.1	
PRO					121	0.1	
DIE VIOLETTEN					114	0.1	▼0.1
RRP					56	0.0	▼0.5
MLPD					52	0.0	0.0
BüSo					23	0.0	0.0
Informal votes		1,713			1,416		
Total valid votes		139,562			139,859		
Turnout		141,275	70.6	▼2.4			
CSU hold	Majority	44,358	31.7	▲4.7			

=== 2009 election ===
Federal election (2009): Schweinfurt
Notes:	Blue background denotes the winner of the electorate vote. Pink background denotes a candidate elected from their party list. Yellow background denotes an electorate win by a list member, or other incumbent. A ✓ or ✗ denotes status of any incumbent, win or lose respectively.						
Party	Candidate	Votes	%	±%	Party votes	%	±%
CSU	✓ Michael Glos	66,253	46.4	▼7.7	62,265	43.2	▼4.9
SPD	Frank Hofmann	27,794	19.4	▼8.5	24,747	17.2	▼8.7
Left	Klaus Ernst	14,803	10.4	▲3.9	13,317	9.2	▲3.9
Greens	Hans Plate	14,598	10.2	▲5.1	13,182	9.1	▲2.5
FDP	Hendrik Lindemann	13,713	9.6	▲5.4	18,742	13.0	▲4.3
Pirates					3,076	2.1	
NPD	Wielant Hopfner	3,029	2.1	▼0.1	1,829	1.3	▼0.1
REP					1,790	1.2	▼0.9
FAMILIE					1,090	0.8	▲0.1
ÖDP					990	0.7	
BP	Frank Hofmann	2,213	1.5		784	0.5	▲0.3
Tierschutzpartei					771	0.5	
RRP					765	0.5	
Independent	Andreas Rückert	526	0.4				
PBC					277	0.2	▼0.1
DIE VIOLETTEN					242	0.2	
CM					157	0.1	
MLPD					62	0.0	0.0
DVU					57	0.0	
BüSo					40	0.0	0.0
Informal votes		3,121			1,867		
Total valid votes		142,929			144,183		
Turnout		146,050	73.0	▼5.9			
CSU hold	Majority	38,459	27.0	▲0.8			

=== 2005 election ===
Federal election (2005):Schweinfurt
Notes:	Blue background denotes the winner of the electorate vote. Pink background denotes a candidate elected from their party list. Yellow background denotes an electorate win by a list member, or other incumbent. A ✓ or ✗ denotes status of any incumbent, win or lose respectively.						
Party	Candidate	Votes	%	±%	Party votes	%	±%
CSU	✓ Michael Glos	82,989	54.1	▼4.3	73,981	48.0	▼8.4
SPD	Frank Hofmann	42,937	28.0	▼2.3	39,889	25.9	▼2.4
Left	Klaus Ernst	9,848	6.4		8,178	5.3	▲4.7
Greens	Marc-Dominic Boberg	7,797	5.1	▼0.7	10,252	6.7	▲0.3
FDP	Horst Krumpen	6,483	4.2	▼0.8	13,320	8.7	▲3.7
NPD	Erich Wilhelm	3,397	2.2		2,037	1.3	▲1.0
REP					3,290	2.1	▲0.8
Familie					1,044	0.7	
Feminist					500	0.3	▲0.2
PBC					462	0.3	▲0.1
GRAUEN					455	0.3	▲0.2
BP					363	0.2	▲0.2
MLPD					128	0.1	
BüSo					83	0.1	0.0
Informal votes		2,979			2,448		
Total valid votes		153,451			153,982		
Turnout		156,430	78.9	▼3.0			
CSU hold	Majority	40,052	26.1				
