= Max Planck Institute for the Study of Crime, Security and Law =

Research Institute in Germany

Coordinates: 47°58′52.00″N 7°50′56.31″E

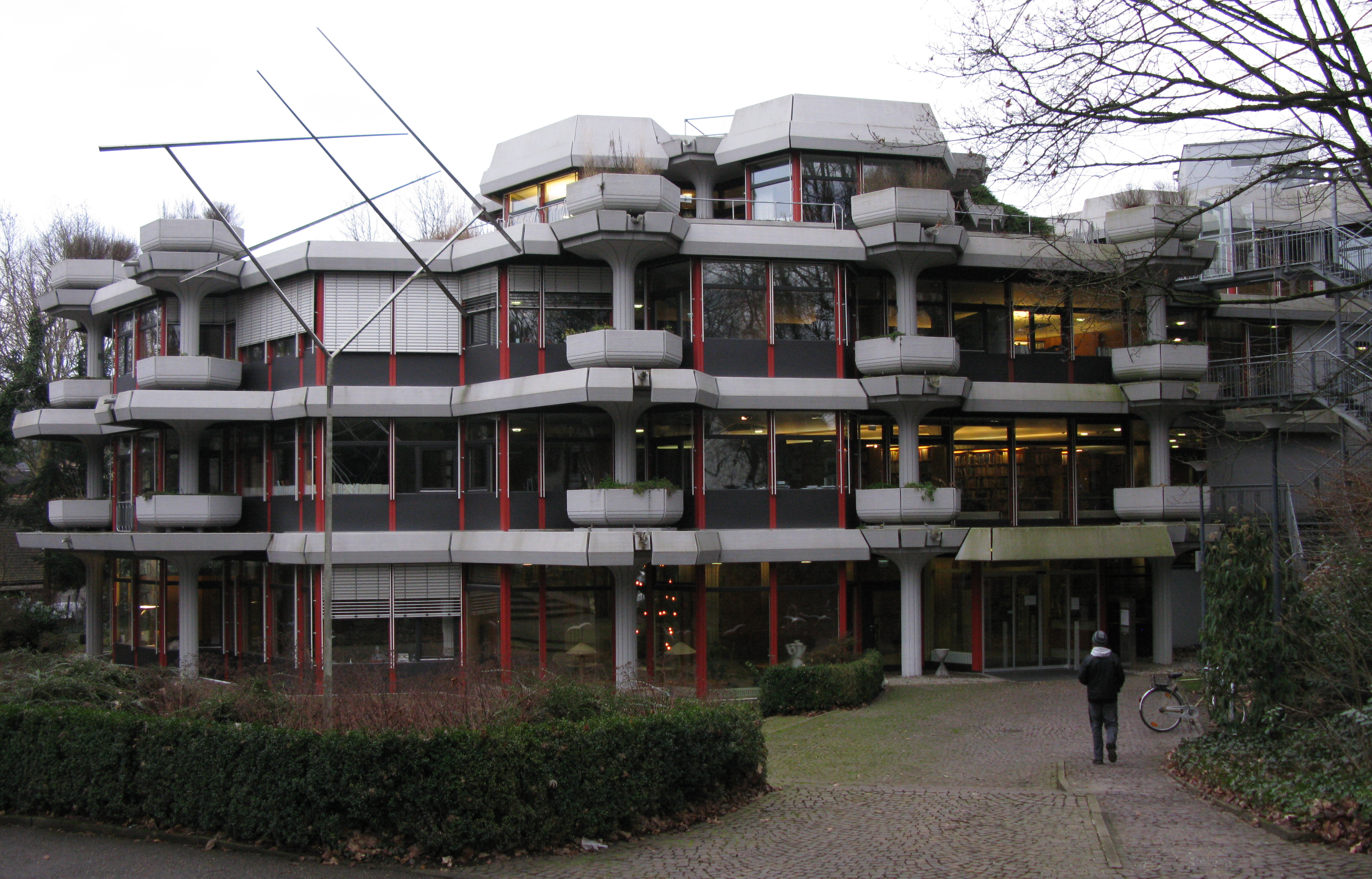
Max Planck Institute for the Study of Crime, Security and Law

The Max Planck Institute for the Study of Crime, Security and Law (German: Max-Planck-Institut zur Erforschung von Kriminalität, Sicherheit und Recht) is a non-university research institute located in Freiburg, Germany. The institute is part of the Max Planck Society and is conducting basic research into criminal law, criminology and public law.

The Institute is currently headed by Jean-Louis van Gelder (Department of Criminology), Ralf Poscher (Department of Public Law) and Tatjana Hörnle (Department of Criminal Law). In 2019, the Institute had a total of 120 employees. The library comprises more than 500,000 titles and is one of the largest libraries in the area. Former directors are Albin Eser, Ulrich Sieber and Hans-Jörg Albrecht.

== Research profile ==
The Max Planck Institute for the Study of Crime, Security and Law belongs to the Human Sciences Section of the Max Planck Society for the Advancement of Science, a formally independent non-governmental and non-profit association. There are three research departments in the Institute: the Department of Criminal Law, the Department of Public Law, and the Department of Criminology. The Institute’s research focus includes both basic research and, owing to its interdisciplinary approach to the legal and social sciences, applied research. While the departments are independent of each other, they are linked in terms of methodology and through the selection of research topics, and they complement each other in their different approaches to research and their theoretical perspectives.

The appointment of a new executive team in 2019 came with a comprehensive reorientation of the key guiding principles for their research agendas. At the heart of the research agenda of the Department of Criminal Law is the development of a transnational theory of criminal law. The objective is to map comprehensively the wide range of available instruments, concepts, and solutions by analyzing on the basis of problem-centered questions different traditions of national criminal law, including the practical aspects of law enforcement. The research agenda of the Department of Public Law addresses issues relevant to security that cannot – or not exclusively – be dealt with by means of the instruments of criminal law. These issues include, in addition to general theoretical and doctrinal questions, current developments in law, technology, and society, i.e., internationalization, digitalization, and fragmentation. The associated normative challenges of danger prevention are analyzed in terms of the protection of basic rights and the principles of rule of law and democracy. The research program of the Department of Criminology focuses on the theoretical and empirical explanations for conforming and deviant behavior. The objective is to explore how individual behavior manifests itself ad hoc, how it changes or develops over time, and how it can be explained. To this end, drawing primarily on psychological theories, innovative new research methods are employed, including computer-assisted experiments using virtual reality software.

With this programmatic organization, the Institute is in a position to address the entire spectrum of current, security-relevant issues – in terms of the phenomena and the associated actors, authorities, concepts, and instruments – in an analytical and methodically comprehensive manner.

== Max Planck Law ==
The institute is part of the research network Max Planck Law.

== See also ==
- The Institute’s homepage
