= Holger Krahmer =

German politician and former Member of the European Parliament (born 1970)

Holger Krahmer (born 16 October 1970 in Leipzig) is a German politician and former Member of the European Parliament with the Free Democratic Party of Germany, part of the Alliance of Liberals and Democrats for Europe.

== Education ==
- 1989: Qualified maintenance technician

== Career ==
- 1990-1996: Bank official, Commerzbank Leipzig
- 1996-2000: Bankgesellschaft Berlin AG
- since 2001: Self-employed
- since 1997: Vice-Chairman of the Leipzig FDP
- since 2001: Member of the ELDR Party Council
- since 2004: Chairman of the Supervisory Board, GANOS Kaffee-Kontor & Rösterei AG, Leipzig

Krahmer was first elected in the 2004 European elections. During his time in Parliament, he served on the European Parliament's Committee on the Environment, Public Health and Food Safety. He was a substitute for the Committee on Regional Development and a member of the Delegation for relations with the NATO Parliamentary Assembly.

== Life after politics ==
After leaving Parliament, Krahmer started working as a senior adviser on EU policy for the consulting firm Hanover Communications. In April 2015, he left Hanover to start working for Opel, the European branch of General Motors (GM), as director of European affairs public policy and government relations.

== Other activities ==
- AIDS-Hilfe Leipzig e.V., Member of the Board (1997-2004)
