= Bernd Schünemann =

German jurist and legal philosopher (born 1944)

Bernd Schünemann (born 1 November 1944) is a German jurist and legal philosopher. A student of Claus Roxin, he earned his doctorate and habilitation in penal law in 1971 and 1975, respectively.

Schünemann is a prolific legal scholar who has served as a consultant for the Bundestag and other organizations. His work is especially known in Latin America and East Asia, and he has received six honorary doctorates from universities around the world.
