= Ulrich Sieber =

Ulrich Sieber in 2015

Ulrich Sieber (born 18 November 1950 in Stuttgart) is a German jurist, law professor, and since October 2003 a director at the Max Planck Institute for Foreign and International Criminal Law in Freiburg im Breisgau, Germany. He is an honorary professor and faculty member at the law faculties of the University of Freiburg and LMU Munich.

== Education and career ==
Ulrich Sieber studied law at the University of Tübingen, the University of Lausanne, and the University of Freiburg. He obtained his doctorate in 1977 at the University of Freiburg with a dissertation on "Computer Crime and Criminal Law". In addition to his academic work, he also worked as an attorney specializing in computer law from 1978 to 1987.

In 1987, he earned a post-doctoral lecturing qualification under the supervision of Klaus Tiedemann at the University of Freiburg with a habilitation on the relationship between substantive criminal law and criminal procedure, and was appointed as professor of criminal law, criminal procedure, and information law at the University of Bayreuth, where he remained until 1991. From 1991 to 2000, he was professor of criminal law, criminal procedure, information law, and legal informatics at the University of Würzburg, where he was dean of the law faculty from 1997 to 1998. According to a ranking of students, he was then the second most popular professor at this university. In 1994, he declined a call to the Chair of Computing Law at the University of Münster (now professor Thomas Hoeren). Also in 1994, he was a visiting professor at the University of Tokyo. In April 2000, he accepted an appointment to succeed Claus Roxin at LMU Munich, and became professor of law and head of the Chair of Criminal Law, Information Law and Computer Technology in Law. He held this position until 2003, when he assumed his current position at the Max Planck Institute.

In addition to his academic work, Sieber has been an expert consultant and advisor, especially in the areas of computer law. In this capacity, he has served as a special advisor to two EC Commissioners with his expertise on issues of computer law and EC fraud. He has also served on the legal committee and several enquiry commissions of the German Parliament and has advised the German Federal Constitutional Court, the German Ministry of Justice, the Federal Ministry of Education and Research, and the Federal Police of Germany. He has also advised the Council of Ministers and the Parliamentary Assembly of the Council of Europe, the European Commission, the Research Ministers of the G-8 nations (Carnegie Group), the OECD, the United Nations, and the International Chamber of Commerce in Paris. As a legal authority, he has written expert opinions for and been a consultant to the International Criminal Tribunal for the former Yugoslavia as well as the Department of Justice in Canada, the U.S. Senate, the Privacy and Civil Liberties Oversight Board of the U.S. government, and the National Police Agency of Japan.

== Research ==
The focus of his scientific publications lies in the areas of multimedia law, cybercrime, economic criminal law, the fight against organized crime, comparative law, European law, and information technology in law.

== Honors and awards ==
Sieber is received honorary doctorates from the National and Kapodistrian University of Athens in Greece, the National University of San Marcos in Lima, Peru, the University of Pécs in Hungary, and from South-West University "Neofit Rilski" in Blagoevgrad, Bulgaria.
