= Glorioso Colegio Nacional de San Carlos =

School in Puno, Peru

Emblematic Public Educational Institution Glorious National School of Saint Charles
- Spanish: Glorioso Colegio Nacional de San Carlos
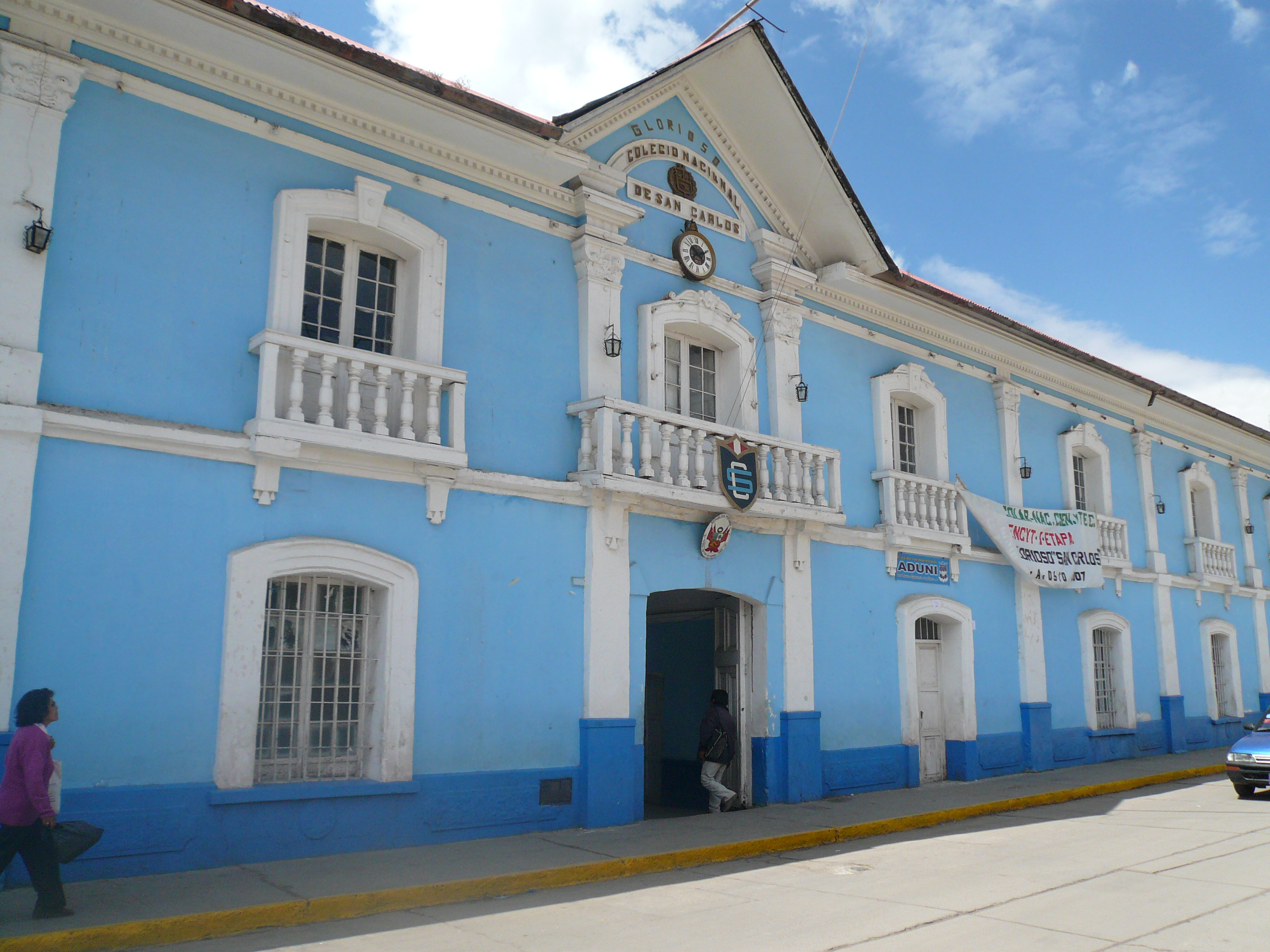
- Emblematic school of Peru and Bolivariano, in the direction of the bicentenary of its foundation.
- Other names: SC, GSC, GCNSC.
- Former name: Colegio de Ciencias y Artes de Puno
- Motto: Spanish: Un Carolino, Un Caballero
- Motto in English: A Carolino, a Knight
- Established: August 7, 1825; 201 years ago
- Founder: Simón Bolivar
- Affiliations: CIEB, CIHCE.
- Director: Teresa Zantina Pilco Montes De Oca
- Students: 1,554
- Location: Jr. Arequipa # 245, Puno, Peru; 15.8376°S 70.0274°W
- Campus: Urban
- Language: Spanish
- Colours: Light blue and white
- Mascot: Donkey
- Website: www.gloriososancarlos.edu.pe

Glorious National School of Saint Charles was created by decree of Simón Bolivar on 7 August 1825 in Puno, Peru.

The school situated in the urban radius of the city of Puno and pertaining to the Unit of Local Educational Management Puno (UGEL Puno), according to the Resolution Directoral Number 674-99-DREP, has by code modulate the 0240184 and 441640 by code of school venue.

It gives education in the following levels:

- Childish education (Educational Institution Initial N° 196 Glorious Saint Carlos)
- Primary education (Primary education|Primary Educational Institution N° 71013 Glorious Saint Carlos)
- Secondary education (Emblematic Educational Institution Secondary Glorious Saint Carlos)
- Education of aldultos (Centre of Alternative Basic Education Glorious Saint Carlos)

== History ==
=== 19th century ===
In the city of the lake (Puno), afterwards of the big praise of José Domingo Choquehuanca to the Libertador Simón Bolívar, the Venezuelan soldier loved by the welcome of the people puneña and motivated by the worry of the youth in instructing, decides erigir the Glorious National School of Saint Carlos, like "School of Sciences and Arts" by means of the Decree of 7 August 1825, which was ratified by the National Congress Constituent of Peru on 31 May 1828.

The first Rector was Fray Mariano Andía, the same that it was remplazado by the Presbítero Melchor Mount of Goose in the year 1828.

In 1829 it designates him School of Sciences and Mathematical.

In 1836 the Marshal Andrés of Santa Cruz, closes the school to turn into it Bolivian barracks for the Confederation Peru-Bolivian.

In 1838 the Marshal Andrés of Santa Cruz, reopens the school with the denomination of School Mineralógico of Socabaya.

In 1861, the Congress of the Republic of Peru, assigns of the National Bottoms the quantity of ten thousand weights to the School of Saint Carlos of Puno by means of Legislative Resolution of 27 March 1861.

In 1866, the president Mariano Ignacio Meadow, by means of Decree of 2 August of the same year, declares that the National School of Saint Carlos of Puno is of complete secondary instruction.

In 1875, the Decree of 12 March of the same year, decrees the instruction that has to give in the School of Saint Carlos of Puno, comprising diverse matters like religion, tongue and Spanish literature, Latin, geography among others.

=== 20th century ===
In 1923 the president Augusto B. Leguía, by means of Law N° 4622 promulgada on 27 January of the same year, has to allocate the acquisition of a Cabinet of physics and of a Laboratory of Chemistry for the National School of Saint Carlos of Puno.

On 13 January 1967, the president Fernando Belaúnde Terry promulga the Law N.º 16388 which creates a section Vespertina in the National School of Saint Carlos of the city of Puno. On 23 July 1980, the old casona of the Glorious Saint Carlos (frontal block) was declared Cultural Heritage of the Nation by means of the R.S. Number 0928-80-ED by the National Institute of Culture.

In 2007, through National Directorial Resolution No. 392/INC, the “San Carlos de Puno” School was declared a monument that is part of the Cultural Heritage of the Nation.
