= Claus Roxin =

German jurist (1931–2025)

- Born: 15 May 1931; Hamburg, Germany
- Died: 18 February 2025 (aged 93)
- Citizenship: German
- Education: University of Göttingen
- Scientific career
- Fields: Penal law, criminal law
- Workplaces: LMU Munich
- Doctoral advisor: Prof. Henkel
- Doctoral students: Bernd Schünemann

Claus Roxin (15 May 1931 – 18 February 2025) was a German jurist. He was one of the most influential dogmatists of German penal law and gained national and international reputation in this field. He was awarded an honorary doctorate by 28 universities around the world as well as the Bundesverdienstkreuz first class.

== Academic life ==
Roxin studied law at the University of Hamburg from 1950 to 1954. Afterwards he worked as scientific assistant for professor Henkel where in 1957 he received a doctor's degree for his thesis Offene Tatbestände und Rechtspflichtmerkmale (open elements of a crime and attributes of statutory duty). In 1962, he habilitated with Täterschaft und Teilnahme (crime and accessory to crime) which became a standard work in this field.

Roxin went on to become a professor at the University of Göttingen in 1963. In 1966, he was one of the authors of the "Alternativentwurf für den Allgemeinen Teil des deutschen Strafgesetzbuchs" (alternative proposal for the general part of the German criminal law) which influenced German criminal law for years to come. From 1968 to 1971 he also worked on the alternative proposal for the special part of the German criminal law which was released in four volumes.

In 1971, he became a professor at LMU Munich where he lectured until 1999 and held the chair for penal law, criminal procedure and general legal doctrine. Afterwards he worked in a workshop of German and Swiss jurists which published an alternative proposal of the German Strafvollzugsgesetz (penal system law) in 1973 and an alternative proposal to the German Strafprozessordnung (code of criminal procedure) in 1980.

In the 1970s, he was a frequent guest on the ZDF show Wie würden Sie entscheiden? that made him known to a wider audience. He is one of the publishers of the "Zeitschrift für die gesamte Strafrechtswissenschaft" and the "Neue Zeitschrift für Strafrecht". In 1994, he became a member of the Bavarian Academy of Sciences and Humanities.

He was honoured with the Bundesverdienstkreuz first class.

== Personal life ==
Roxin was the founder and honorary chairman of the Karl-May-Gesellschaft He was married, had three children and lived in Stockdorf.

Claus Roxin died on 18 February 2025, at the age of 93.

== Academic work ==
Roxin was the author of multiple books, essays and annotations. Amongst them are:

- Offene Tatbestände und Rechtspflichtmerkmale. 2nd edition. Verlag Cram, de Gruyter & Co., Hamburg 1970.
- Täterschaft und Tatherrschaft. 8th edition. Verlag de Gruyter, Hamburg 2006.
- Strafrecht, Allgemeiner Teil, Band I: Grundlagen. Der Aufbau der Verbrechenslehre. 4th edition. Verlag C. H. Beck, München 2006.
- Strafrecht, Allgemeiner Teil, Band II: Besondere Erscheinungsformen der Straftat. Verlag C. H. Beck, München 2003.
- Karl May, das Strafrecht und die Literatur. in: Jahrbuch der Karl-May-Gesellschaft 1978, S. 9-36.

== Books about Roxin ==
- Bernd Schünemann (ed.): Festschrift für Claus Roxin zum 70. Geburtstag am 15. Mai 2001. Verlag de Gruyter. Berlin, New York 2001, ISBN 3-11-016515-5.
- Bernd Schünemann (ed.): Claus Roxin: Person – Werk – Epoche. Centaurus-Verlag. Herbolzheim 2003, ISBN 3-8255-0381-X .
- Hans Achenbach: Claus Roxin zum 75. Geburtstag. In: Neue Juristische Wochenschrift 2006, S. 1405.
- Jürgen Wolter et al.: Festgabe für Claus Roxin zum 75. Geburtstag. In: Goltdammer's Archiv für Strafrecht (Heft 5) 2006, S. 255–438.
