= Raúl Zaffaroni =

Argentine judge

Eugenio Raúl Zaffaroni
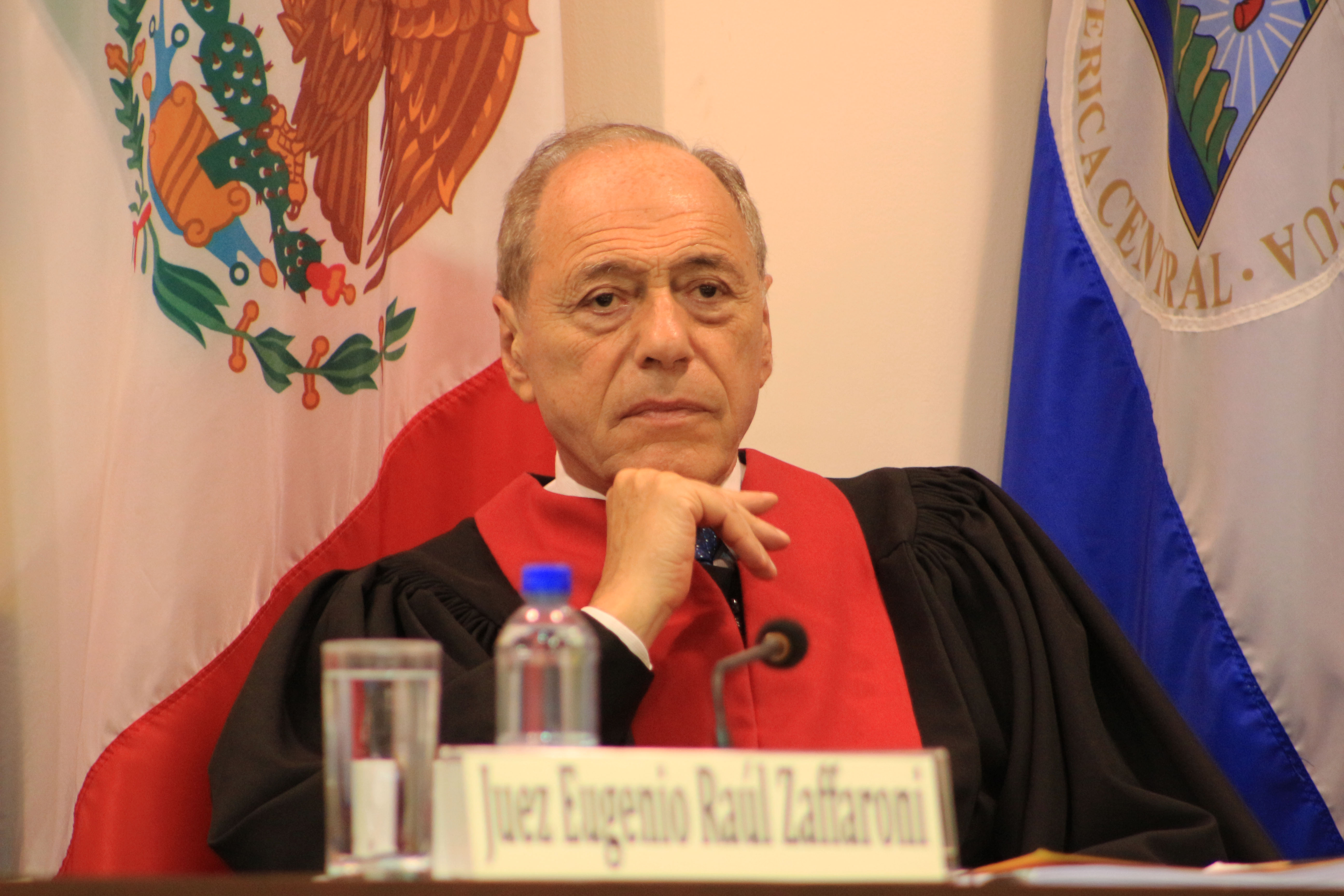
- Inter-American Court of Human Rights
- Born: January 7, 1940 (age 85); Buenos Aires
- Occupation(s): Lawyer, judge, jurist, jurisconsult, criminologist.
- Awards: Stockholm Prize in Criminology

Academic background
- Education: Universidad Nacional del Litoral; Universidad de Buenos Aires

Academic work
- Discipline: Law
- Sub-discipline: Criminal Law, Criminology.

Eugenio Raúl Zaffaroni (born 1940, in Buenos Aires) is a former Argentine politician and judge. He served as a member of the Supreme Court of Argentina from 2003 until 2015, when he resigned due to age restrictions to hold the position. He subsequently served in the Inter-American Court of Human Rights from 2016 to 2022.

== Academic career ==
Zaffaroni holds a Ph.D. in Law and Social Sciences from Universidad Nacional del Litoral, awarded in 1964. He is Professor and Chair of the Department of Criminal Law at the Universidad de Buenos Aires. He serves as President of the Advisory Committee of the Instituto de Políticas Públicas (Public Policy Institute) and Vice President of the Scientific Committee of the International Association of Penal Law. He has been awarded OEA and Max Planck Stiftung fellowships and won the Stockholm Prize in Criminology in 2009. He holds honorary degrees from universities in Latin America, Spain, and Italy.

== Legal career ==
Zaffaroni served two decades on the Federal Penal Court of Buenos Aires City, from 1975 to 1990. Then he was the General Director of the Instituto Latinoamericano de Prevención del Delito, a branch of the United Nations. He represented the Front for a Country in Solidarity in the assembly that drew up the 1994 reform of the Argentine Constitution. He was a member of the Buenos Aires Chamber of Representatives in 1997, and Director of the National Institute Against Discrimination during 2000-2001.

Zaffaroni has been called a garantista, meaning a holder of a certain type of criminal law abolitionist position. He was criticized because of his former open abolitionism (easily recognizable in his 1989 book En busca de las penas perdidas), from which he later distanced himself and now he identifies with what he calls "reductive functionalism," that is an extreme form of criminal minimalism tending to abolitionism. He endorses what he names "agnostic theory of punishment," implying no theory is sufficient to justify the existence of prisons. He is close to critical criminology and has criticized the war on drugs.

In 1993, Zaffaroni was elected to the 1994 Constitutional Assembly for the Frepaso party. In 1997, he was elected as deputy in the City of Buenos Aires for the Frepaso party. In 2000, he was assigned by then President Fernando de la Rua as intervenor of the National Institute Against Discrimination, Xenophobia and Racism (INADI). In 2003, he was nominated to the Argentine Supreme Court by President Nestor Kirchner.

== Writings ==
Zaffaroni has drafted penal legislation for Argentina (1991), Costa Rica (1991), and Ecuador (1992). He has written 25 books, including Manual de Derecho Penal, Tratado de Derecho Penal in five volumes, En busca de las penas perdidas and Estructuras judiciales. He co-authored Derecho Penal: General with Alejandro Slokar and Alejandro Alagia. He has published extensively in scholarly journals.

He is a member of the Crimes Against Humanity Initiative Advisory Council, a project of the Whitney R. Harris World Law Institute at Washington University School of Law in St. Louis to establish the world’s first treaty on the prevention and punishment of crimes against humanity.

== Controversies ==
A NGO called "La Alameda" brought a lawsuit against Zaffaroni on the basis of him having 6 apartments where prostitution was illegally practiced. He consistently denied all charges, and the trial was closed with no consequences to the judge.

He expressed his feelings about Mauricio Macri administration on several occasions and wished "it come to an end as soon as possible."

== Bibliography ==
- MARTINS JÚNIOR, Fernando Nogueira. Penalistica Marginalia: Considerações sobre os fundamentos sociológico- políticos da dogmática de Eugênio Raul Zaffaroni in Revista do CAAP, n. 1, v. XVII, Belo Horizonte, 2012, pp. 79–90.
