= Prichsenstadt =

- Town
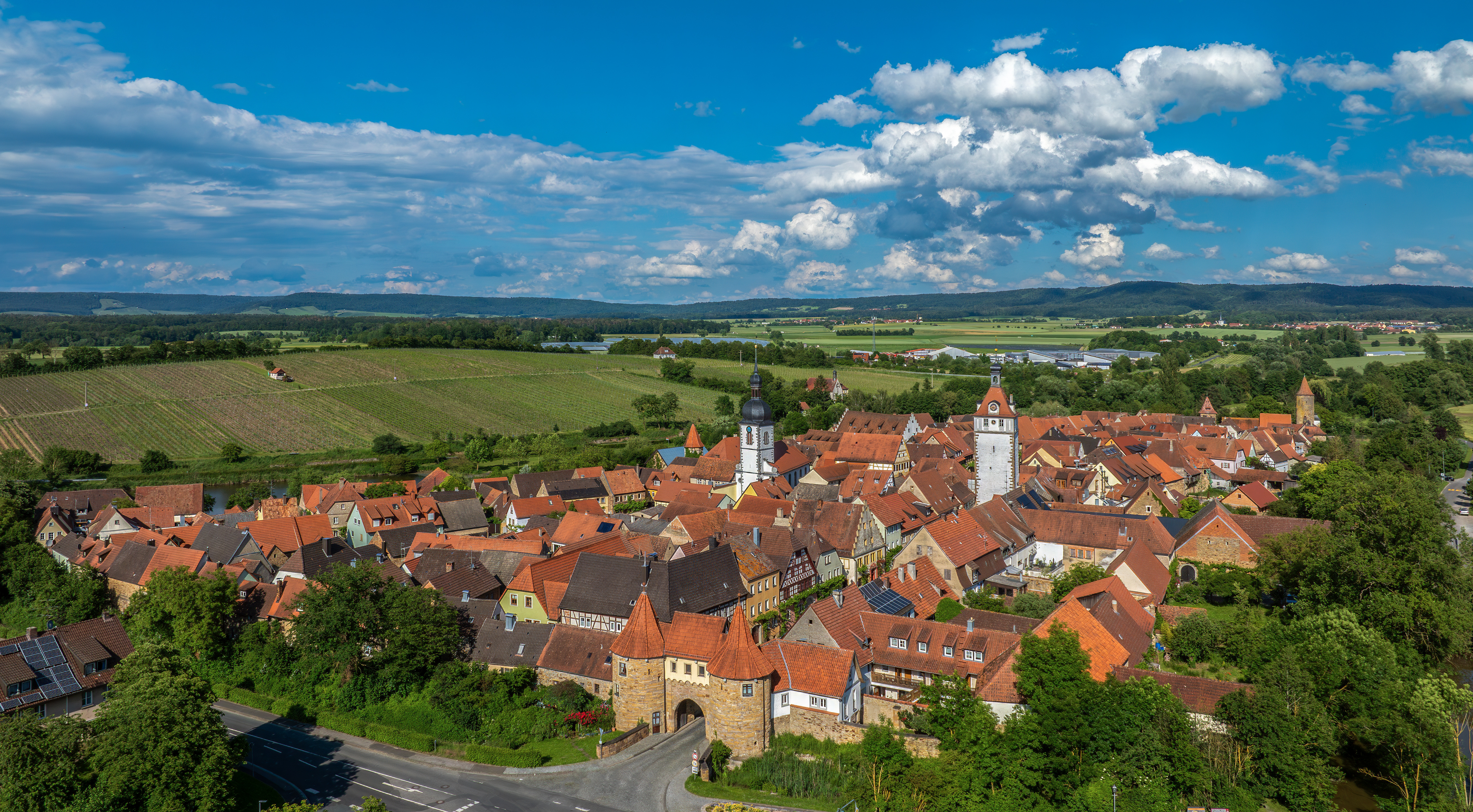
- Aerial view of Prichsenstadt

- Coat of arms

- Location of Prichsenstadt within Kitzingen district
- Interactive map of Prichsenstadt
- Location within Germany Location within Bavaria
- Coordinates: 49°49′N 10°20′E
- Country: Germany
- State: Bavaria
- Admin. region: Unterfranken
- District: Kitzingen
- Subdivisions: 10 Ortsteile

Government
  - Mayor (2020–26): René Schlehr (CSU)

Area
  - Total: 48.87 km^{2} (18.87 sq mi)
- Elevation: 248 m (814 ft)

Population (2025-12-31)
  - Total: 2,989
  - Density: 61.16/km^{2} (158.4/sq mi)
- Time zone: UTC+01:00 (CET)
  - Summer (DST): UTC+02:00 (CEST)
- Postal codes: 97357
- Dialling codes: 09383, 09382
- Vehicle registration: KT
- Website: www.prichsenstadt.de

Prichsenstadt (German: [ˈpʁɪksn̩ˌʃtat]) is a town in the district of Kitzingen, Lower Franconia, Bavaria, Germany.
