= Sixth European Parliament =

6th European Parliament
- 20 July 2004 – 7 May 2009
- President (1st Half): Josep Borrell
- President (2nd Half): Hans-Gert Poettering
- Commission: Barroso
- Political groups: EPP-ED; PES; ALDE; Greens-EFA; EUL-NGL; ID; UEN; ITS; NI
- MEPs: 732 (2004–2006); 785 (2007–2009)
- Elections: June 2004 (Union); May 2007 (Bulgaria); November 2007 (Romania)
- Nice (Note: The Treaties of Rome and Treaty of Maastricht as amended by the Treaty of Nice and all preceding amending treaties.)

The sixth European Parliament was the sixth five-year term of the elected European Parliament. It began on Tuesday 20 July 2004 in Strasbourg following the 2004 elections and ended after the 2009 elections.

== Major events ==
- 10–13 June 2004
  - Elections to the Sixth Parliament.
- 20 July 2004
  - First meeting (constitutive session) of the Sixth Parliament.
  - Giovanni Berlinguer presides as oldest member.
  - Josep Borrell is elected as President of the European Parliament.
- 22 July 2004
  - Parliament approves José Manuel Barroso as President of the European Commission.
- 27 September to 11 October 2004
  - Parliamentary hearings for the European Commissioners.
  - Parliament airs objections to Ingrida Udre, László Kovács, Neelie Kroes, Mariann Fischer-Boel and Rocco Buttiglione.
  - Buttiglione is replaced by Franco Frattini, Ingrida Udre replaced by Andris Piebalgs and László Kovács reshuffled.
- 18 November 2004
  - The Barroso Commission is approved by Parliament.
- 22 November 2004
  - Barroso Commission takes office.
- 12 December 2006
  - Parliament approves Meglena Kuneva and Leonard Orban as new European Commissioners for Romania and Bulgaria.
- 1 January 2007
  - Accession of Romania and Bulgaria, their observers in Parliament become full MEPs.
- 15 January 2007
  - Hans-Gert Pöttering is elected President of the European Parliament.
- 20 May 2007
  - Election of Bulgarian MEPs.
- 25 November 2007
  - Election of Romanian MEPs.
- 20 February 2008
  - Parliament approves the Lisbon Treaty.

== Activity ==
	2004	2005	2006	2007	2008	2009	Source
Reports	73	415	481	519	515	268	
Resolutions and positions	80	440	483	494	514	215	
Parliamentary questions	2525	6310	7032	7765	8266	3373	
Written declarations	27	82	91	115	106	52	

== Major resolutions and positions ==
Resolution/position number	Procedure number	Notes
P6_TA(2006)0552	COD/2003/0256	Amended and approved Regulation (EC) No 1907/2006, the REACH regulation
P6_TA(2007)0032	INI/2006/2200	European Parliament resolution on the alleged use of European countries by the CIA for the transportation and illegal detention of prisoners
P6_TA(2006)0490	COD/2004/0001	Amended and approved Directive 2006/123/EC, the Bolkestein directive
P6_TA(2007)0401	COD/2004/0047	Amended and approved Directive 2007/58/EC, the rail competition directive
P6_TA(2005)0275	COD/2002/0047	Rejected the proposed directive on the patentability of computer-implemented inventions
P6_TA(2007)0199	COD/2006/0133	Amended and approved Regulation (EC) No 717/2007, the mobile phone roaming regulation
P6_TA(2008)0342	COD/2006/0130	Amended and approved Regulation (EC) No 1008/2008, the air pricing clarity regulation
P6_TA(2008)0293	COD/2005/0167	Amended and approved Directive 2008/115/EC, the illegal immigration directive
P6_TA(2005)0132	INI/2004/2172	European Parliament resolution on the Common Foreign and Security Policy

== Committees ==
=== Summary ===
Type	Number	Sources	Notes
Standing committee	20 (+2 subcommittees)		
Temporary committee	3		See below for list
Committee of enquiry	1		See below for list

=== Temporary committees ===
Code	Committee	Report	Sources
CLIM	Temporary Committee on Climate Change	A6-2008-0495	
TDIP	Temporary Committee on the alleged use of European countries by the CIA for the transport and illegal detention of prisoners	A6-2007-0020	
FINP	Temporary Committee on policy challenges and budgetary means of the enlarged Union 2007–2013	A6-2005-0153	

=== Committees of enquiry ===
Code	Committee	Report	Sources
EQUI	Committee of Inquiry into the crisis of the Equitable Life Assurance Society	A6-2007-0203	

== Delegations ==
Type	Number	Sources
Europe delegations	10	
Non-Europe delegations	24	
Ad-hoc delegations	1	

== Political groups ==
See membership below for details of size

Group name	Acronym
European People's Party–European Democrats	EPP-ED
Party of European Socialists	PES
Alliance of Liberals and Democrats for Europe	ALDE
Greens/European Free Alliance	G/EFA
European United Left-Nordic Green Left	EUL-NGL
Independence/Democracy	IND/DEM
Union for a Europe of Nations	UEN
Identity, Tradition, Sovereignty (Note: Created 15 January 2007, disbanded 14 November 2007)	ITS
Non-Inscrits (Note: Independents, not a group)	NI

== Leadership ==
=== Presidents ===
Term	President (or candidate)	Group	State	Votes
20 July 2004– 14 January 2007	Josep Borrell	PES	Spain	388
20 July 2004– 14 January 2007	Bronisław Geremek	ALDE	Poland	208
20 July 2004– 14 January 2007	Francis Wurtz	EUL/NGL	France	51
15 January 2007– 14 July 2009	Hans-Gert Pöttering	EPP-ED	Germany	450
15 January 2007– 14 July 2009	Monica Frassoni	G/EFA	Italy	145
15 January 2007– 14 July 2009	Francis Wurtz	EUL/NGL	France	48
15 January 2007– 14 July 2009	Jens-Peter Bonde	IND/DEM	Denmark	46

=== Vice-Presidents ===
Group	2004–2006	2007–2009
EPP-ED	Alejo Vidal-Quadras Roca; Antonios Trakatellis; Edward McMillan-Scott; Ingo Friedrich; Mario Mauro; Jacek Saryusz-Wolski; Miroslav Ouzký	Rodi Kratsa-Tsagaropoulou; Alejo Vidal-Quadras; Edward McMillan-Scott; Mario Mauro
PES	Dagmar Roth-Behrendt; António Costa; Pierre Moscovici	Miguel Angel Martínez Martínez; Mechtild Rothe; Pierre Moscovici; Manuel António Dos Santos; Marek Siwiec
ALDE	Luigi Cocilovo; Janusz Onyszkiewicz	Luigi Cocilovo; Diana Wallis
G/EFA	Gérard Onesta	Gérard Onesta
EUL-NGL	Sylvia-Yvonne Kaufmann	Luisa Morgantini
IND/DEM	n/a	n/a
UEN	n/a	Adam Bielan
ITS	n/a	n/a

=== Quaestors ===
Group	2004–2006	2007–2009
EPP-ED	James Nicholson; Godelieve Quisthoudt-Rowohl; Astrid Lulling	James Nicholson; Astrid Lulling; Ingo Friedrich
PES	Genowefa Grabowska; Mia De Vits	Mia De Vits; Szabolcs Fazakas
ALDE	n/a	Jan Mulder

=== Chairs of the political groups ===
Group	Chairs
EPP-ED	Hans-Gert Pöttering (until 2007), Joseph Daul (from 2007)
PES	Martin Schulz
ALDE	Graham Watson
G/EFA	Monica Frassoni; Daniel Cohn-Bendit
EUL-NGL	Alonso José Puerta; Francis Wurtz
IND/DEM	Jens-Peter Bonde (until 2008), Kathy Sinnott (2008), Hanne Dahl (from 2008); Nigel Farage (full term)
UEN	Brian Crowley (until 2009); Cristiana Muscardini
ITS	Bruno Gollnisch (2007)

== Membership ==
See List of members of the European Parliament 2004–2009 for the full list.
Groups

Group	Seats			
Group	2004 (Note: Tuesday 20 July 2004: first day of the constitutive session of the Sixth European Parliament. By Friday 23 July 2004, the composition had changed slightly.)	2007 (Note: Composition of 15 January 2007 following the creation of ITS)	2007 (Note: Following Bulgarian and Romanian elections)	2009 (Note: Before 2009 election)
EPP-ED	268	277	288	288
PES	200	218	215	217
ALDE	88	106	101	104
G/EFA	42	42	43	43
EUL-NGL	41	40	41	41
IND/DEM	33 (Note: Four Lega Nord MEPs arrived on 20 July 2004, sat with the Non-Inscrits for one day, then sat with IND/DEM on 21 July 2004, bringing the number of IND/DEM MEPs up to 37. Consequently, "37" is sometimes given as the number of IND/DEM MEPs on 20 July 2004.)	23	24	22
UEN	27	44	44	40
ITS	n/a	20	n/a	n/a
NI	33	14	29	30

Apportionment

State	Seats	State	Seats
Germany	99	France	78
United Kingdom	78	Italy	78
Spain	54	Poland	54
Romania (Note: Bulgaria and Romania joined on 1 January 2007. Prior to 2007 there were 732 seats, following enlargement the Romanian and Bulgarian seats were added bringing it to 785.)	35	Netherlands	27
Greece	24	Portugal	24
Belgium	24	Czech Republic	24
Hungary	24	Sweden	19
Austria	18	Bulgaria	18
Denmark	14	Slovakia	14
Finland	14	Ireland	13
Lithuania	13	Latvia	9
Slovenia	7	Estonia	6
Cyprus	6	Luxembourg	6
Malta	5	Total	732 / 785

== Secretariat ==
Office	Post	Name	Source
Office of the Secretary-General	Secretary-General of the European Parliament	Julian Priestley (to 2007); Harald Rømer (2007 to 2009); Klaus Welle (since 2009)	
Legal Service	Jurisconsult of the European Parliament	Christian Pennera	
Directorate-General for the Presidency	Director-General	David Harley	
Directorate-General for Internal Policies of the Union	Director-General	Riccardo Ribera d'Alcala	
Directorate-General for External Policies of the Union	Director-General	Dietmar Nickel	
Directorate-General for Communication	Director-General	Francesca R. Ratti	
Directorate-General for Personnel	Director-General	Barry Wilson	
Directorate-General for Infrastructure and Logistics	Director-General	Constantin Stratigakis	
Directorate-General for Translation	Director-General	Juana Lahousse-Juárez	
Directorate-General for Interpretation and Conferences	Director-General	Olga Cosmidou	
Directorate-General for Finance	Director-General	Roger Vanhaeren	
