= Vice-President of the European Parliament =

Political office in the European Parliament

There are fourteen vice-presidents of the European Parliament who sit in for the president in presiding over the plenary of the European Parliament.

== Role ==
Vice-presidents are members of the Bureau and chair the plenary when the president is not in the chair. The president may also delegate any duty, task or power to one of the vice-presidents. Three vice-presidents, designated by the Conference of Presidents, traditionally have more power than the others; the right to be on the conciliation committee.

The vice-presidents are elected following the election of the president, which takes place every two and a half years or when necessary if positions become vacant.

== 6th parliament ==
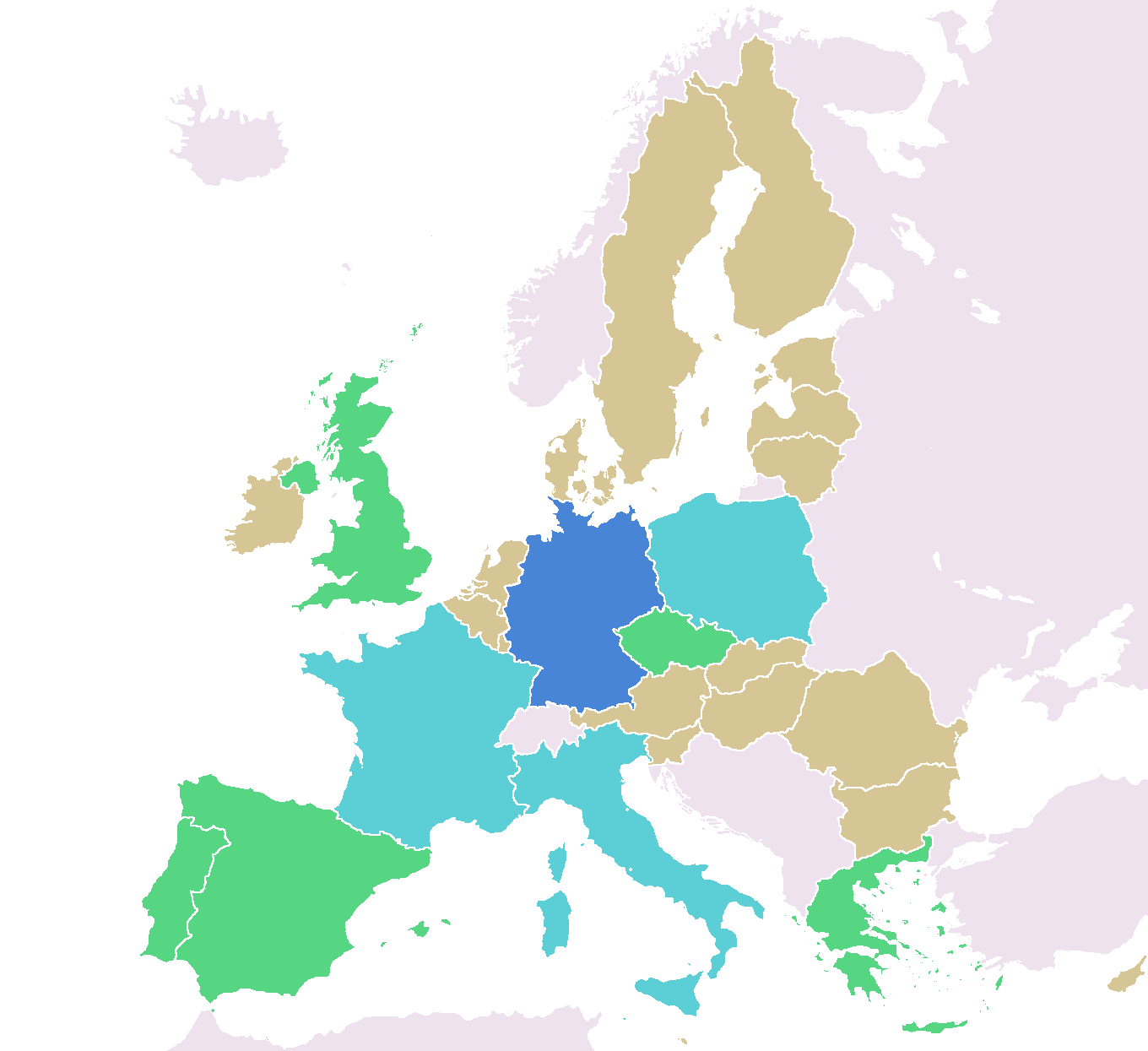
Vice-presidents elected by country in 2004 Three Two One None

30 July 2004 to 16 January 2007

Elected (unopposed) in order of precedence;

	Members	Group	State
1	Alejo Vidal-Quadras Roca	EPP-ED	Spain
2	Antonios Trakatellis	EPP-ED	Greece
3	Dagmar Roth-Behrendt	PES	Germany
4	Edward McMillan-Scott	EPP-ED	United Kingdom
5	Ingo Friedrich	EPP-ED	Germany
6	Mario Mauro	EPP-ED	Italy
7	António Costa	PES	Portugal
8	Luigi Cocilovo	ALDE	Italy
9	Jacek Saryusz-Wolski	EPP-ED	Poland
10	Pierre Moscovici	PES	France
11	Miroslav Ouzký	EPP-ED	Czech Republic
12	Janusz Onyszkiewicz	ALDE	Poland
13	Gérard Onesta	Greens/EFA	France
14	Sylvia-Yvonne Kaufmann	EUL/NGL	Germany

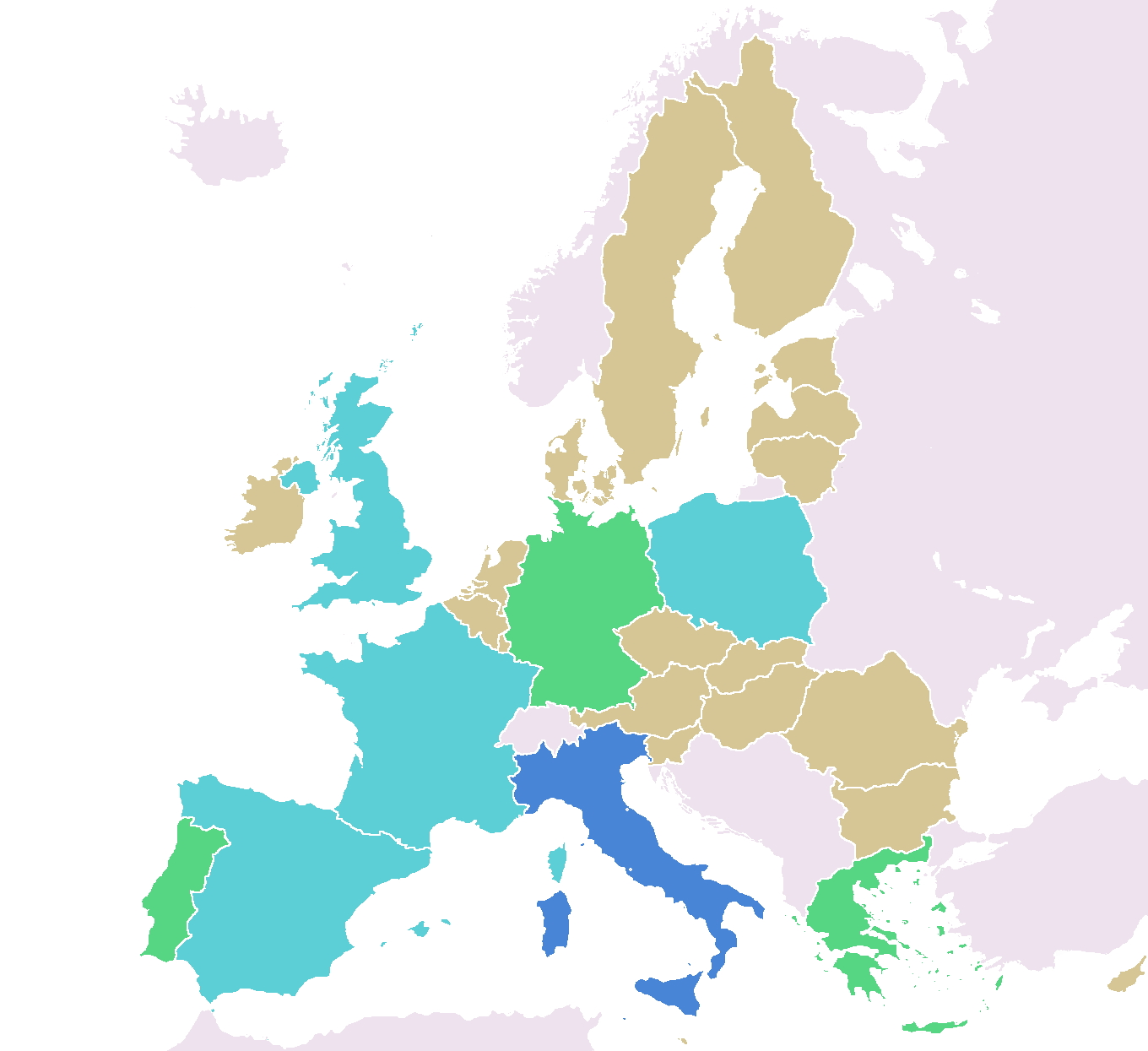
Vice-presidents elected by country in 2007 Three Two One None

16 January 2007 to 14 July 2009

Elected (unopposed) in order of precedence:

	Members	Group	State	Votes
1	Rodi Kratsa-Tsagaropoulou	EPP-ED	Greece	322
2	Alejo Vidal-Quadras	EPP-ED	Spain	300
3	Gérard Onesta	Greens/EFA	France	285
4	Edward McMillan-Scott	EPP-ED	United Kingdom	274
5	Mario Mauro	EPP-ED	Italy	262
6	Miguel Angel Martínez Martínez	PES	Spain	260
7	Luigi Cocilovo	ALDE	Italy	234
8	Mechtild Rothe	PES	Germany	217
9	Luisa Morgantini	The left	Italy	
10	Pierre Moscovici	PES	France	207
11	Manuel António Dos Santos	PES	Portugal	193
12	Diana Wallis	ALDE	United Kingdom	192
13	Marek Siwiec	PES	Poland	180
14	Adam Bielan	UEN	Poland	128

== 7th parliament ==
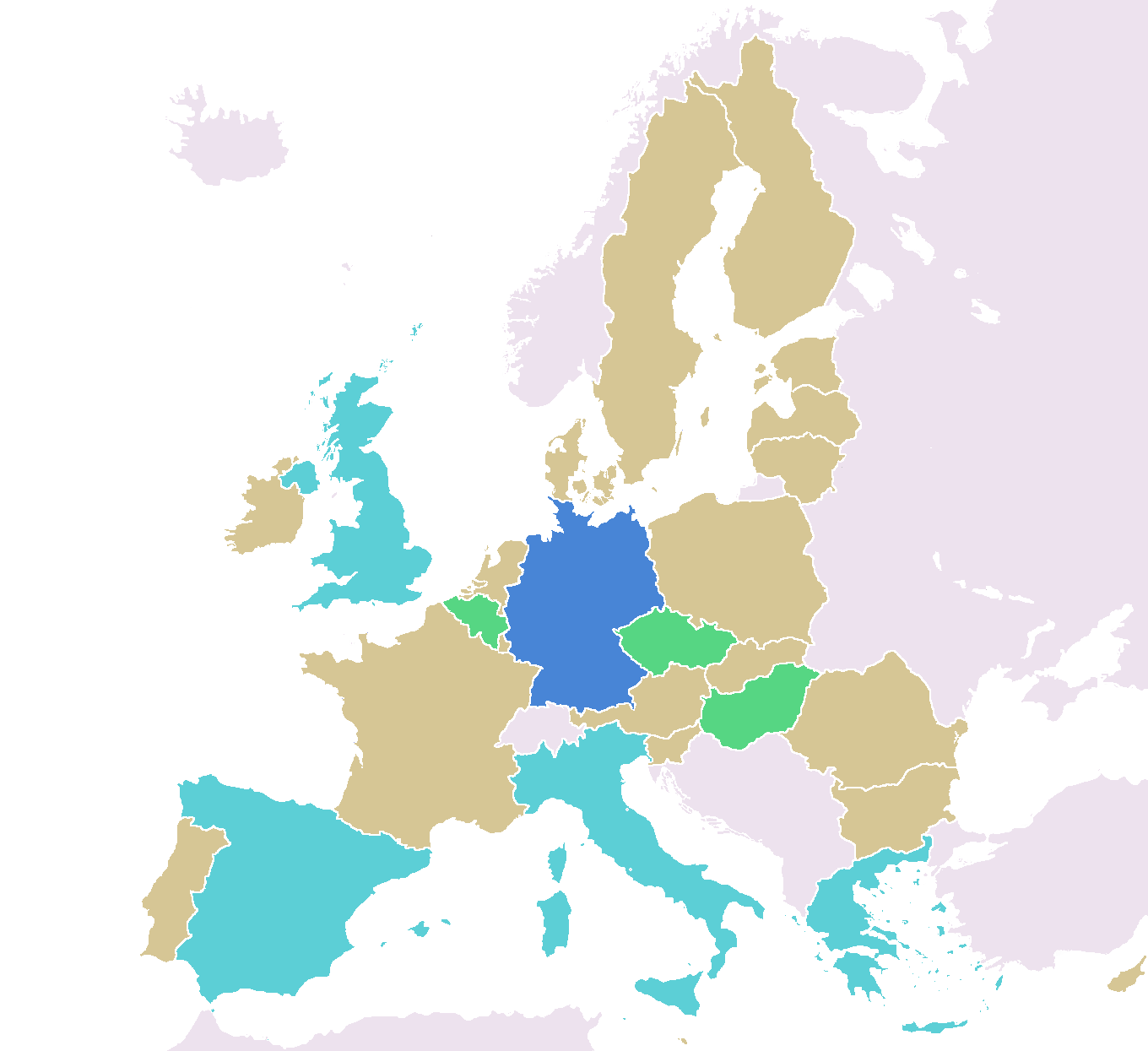
Vice-presidents elected by country in 2009 Three Two One None

14 July 2009 to 17 January 2012

Elected in order of precedence:

	Members	Group	State	Votes
1	Giovanni Pittella	S&D	Italy	360
2	Rodi Kratsa-Tsagaropoulou	EPP	Greece	355
3	Stavros Lambrinidis	S&D	Greece	346
4	Miguel Angel Martínez Martínez	S&D	Spain	327
5	Alejo Vidal-Quadras	EPP	Spain	308
6	Dagmar Roth-Behrendt	S&D	Germany	287
7	Libor Rouček	S&D	Czech Republic	278
8	Isabelle Durant	Greens/EFA	Belgium	276
9	Roberta Angelilli	EPP	Italy	274
10	Diana Wallis	ALDE	United Kingdom	272
11	Pál Schmitt	EPP	Hungary	257
12	Edward McMillan-Scott	Non-attached	United Kingdom	244
13	Rainer Wieland	EPP	Germany	237
14	Silvana Koch-Mehrin	ALDE	Germany	186

Changes since election
Departed member	Group	State	Date	Reason	Replacement	Elected	Group	State
Pál Schmitt	EPP	Hungary	14 May 2010	Resigned due to becoming president of Hungary	László Tőkés	May 2010	EPP	Romania
Silvana Koch-Mehrin	ALDE	Germany	11 May 2011	Resigned due to doctorate plagiarism scandal	Giles Chichester	6 July 2011	ECR	(United Kingdom) UK

17 January 2012 to 1 July 2014

Elected in order of precedence:

	Members	Group	State	Votes
1	Gianni Pittella	S&D	Italy	319
2	Miguel Angel Martínez Martínez	S&D	Spain	295
3	Anni Podimata	S&D	Greece	281
4	Alejo Vidal-Quadras	EPP	Spain	269
5	Georgios Papastamkos	EPP	Greece	248
6	Roberta Angelilli	EPP	Italy	246
7	Othmar Karas	EPP	Austria	244
8	Edward McMillan-Scott	ALDE	United Kingdom	239
9	Isabelle Durant	Greens/EFA	Belgium	238
10	Alexander Alvaro	ALDE	Germany	235
11	Rainer Wieland	EPP	Germany	230
12	Oldřich Vlasák	ECR	Czech Republic	223
13	Jacek Protasiewicz	EPP	Poland	206
14	László Surján	EPP	Hungary	188

== 8th parliament ==
1 July 2014 to 18 January 2017

Elected in order of precedence:

	Members	Group	State	Votes
1	Antonio Tajani	EPP	Italy	452, Round 1
2	Mairead McGuinness	EPP	(Republic of Ireland) Ireland	441, Round 1
3	Rainer Wieland	EPP	Germany	437, Round 1
4	Ramón Luis Valcárcel	EPP	Spain	406, Round 1
5	Ildikó Pelczné Gáll	EPP	Hungary	400, Round 1
6	Adina Vălean	EPP	Romania	394, Round 1
7	Corina Crețu	S&D	Romania	406, Round 2
8	Sylvie Guillaume	S&D	France	406, Round 2
9	David Sassoli	S&D	Italy	394, Round 2
10	Olli Rehn	ALDE	Finland	377, Round 3
11	Alexander Graf Lambsdorff	ALDE	Germany	365, Round 3
12	Ulrike Lunacek	Greens/EFA	Austria	319, Round 3
13	Dimitrios Papadimoulis	GUE/NGL	Greece	302, Round 3
14	Ryszard Czarnecki	ECR	Poland	284, Round 3

Changes since election
Departed member	Group	State	Date	Reason	Replacement	Elected	Group	State
Corina Crețu	S&D	Romania	October 2014	Resigned due to becoming European Commissioner	Ioan Mircea Pașcu	November 2014	S&D	Romania
Olli Rehn	ALDE	Finland	May 2015	Resigned due to becoming Minister of Economic Affairs of Finland	Anneli Jäätteenmäki	May 2015	ALDE	Finland

18 January 2017 to 3 July 2019

Elected in order of precedence;

	Members	Group	State	Votes
1	Mairead McGuinness	EPP	(Republic of Ireland) Ireland	466, Round 1
2	Bogusław Liberadzki	S&D	Poland	378, Round 1
3	David Sassoli	S&D	Italy	377, Round 1
4	Rainer Wieland	EPP	Germany	336, Round 1
5	Sylvie Guillaume	S&D	France	335, Round 1
6	Ryszard Czarnecki	ECR	Poland	328, Round 1
7	Ramón Luis Valcárcel	EPP	Spain	323, Round 1
8	Evelyne Gebhardt	S&D	Germany	315, Round 1
9	Pavel Telička	ALDE	Czech Republic	313, Round 1
10	Ildikó Pelczné Gáll	EPP	Hungary	310, Round 1
11	Ioan Mircea Pașcu	S&D	Romania	517, Round 2
12	Dimitrios Papadimoulis	GUE/NGL	Greece	469, Round 2
13	Ulrike Lunacek	Greens/EFA	Austria	441, Round 2
14	Alexander Graf Lambsdorff	ALDE	Germany	393, Round 2

Changes since election
Departed member	Group	State	Date	Reason	Replacement	Elected	Group	State
Ildikó Pelczné Gáll	EPP	Hungary	1 September 2017	Resigned due to joining the European Court of Auditors	Lívia Járóka	15 November 2017	EPP	Hungary
Ulrike Lunacek	Greens/EFA	Austria	23 October 2017	Resigned from politics after a defeat in national elections	Heidi Hautala	26 October 2017	Greens/EFA	Finland
Alexander Graf Lambsdorff	ALDE	Germany	23 October 2017	Resigned due to becoming member of the Bundestag	Fabio Massimo Castaldo	15 November 2017	EFDD	Italy
Ryszard Czarnecki	ECR	Poland	7 February 2018	Removed from office due to serious misconduct	Zdzisław Krasnodębski	1 March 2018	ECR	Poland

== 9th Parliament ==
3 July 2019 to 18 January 2022

Elected in order of precedence:

	Members	Group	State	Votes
1	Mairead McGuinness	EPP	(Republic of Ireland) Ireland	618, Round 1
2	Pedro Silva Pereira	S&D	Portugal	556, Round 1
3	Rainer Wieland	EPP	Germany	516, Round 1
4	Katarina Barley	S&D	Germany	516, Round 1
5	Othmar Karas	EPP	Austria	477, Round 1
6	Ewa Kopacz	EPP	Poland	461, Round 1
7	Klára Dobrev	S&D	Hungary	402, Round 1
8	Dita Charanzová	RE	Czech Republic	395, Round 1
9	Nicola Beer	RE	Germany	363, Round 1
10	Lívia Járóka	EPP	Hungary	349, Round 1
11	Heidi Hautala	Greens/EFA	Finland	336, Round 1
12	Marcel Kolaja	Greens/EFA	Czech Republic	426, Round 2
13	Dimitrios Papadimoulis	GUE/NGL	Greece	401, Round 2
14	Fabio Massimo Castaldo	NI	Italy	285, Round 3

Changes since election
Departed member	Group	State	Date	Reason	Replacement	Elected	Group	State
Mairead McGuinness	EPP	(Republic of Ireland) Ireland	October 2020	Resigned due to becoming European Commissioner	Roberta Metsola	November 2020	EPP	Malta

18 January 2022 to 16 July 2024

Elected in order of precedence:

	Members	Group	State	Votes
1	Othmar Karas	EPP	Austria	536, Round 1
2	Pina Picierno	S&D	Italy	527, Round 1
3	Pedro Silva Pereira	S&D	Portugal	517, Round 1
4	Ewa Kopacz	EPP	Poland	467, Round 1
5	Eva Kaili	S&D	Greece	454, Round 1
6	Evelyn Regner	S&D	Austria	434, Round 1
7	Rainer Wieland	EPP	Germany	432, Round 1
8	Katarina Barley	S&D	Germany	426, Round 1
9	Dita Charanzová	RE	Czech Republic	406, Round 1
10	Michal Šimečka	RE	Slovakia	494, Round 2
11	Nicola Beer	RE	Germany	410, Round 2
12	Roberts Zīle	ECR	Latvia	403, Round 2
13	Dimitrios Papadimoulis	GUE/NGL	Greece	492, Round 3
14	Heidi Hautala	Greens/EFA	Finland	304, Round 3

Changes since election
Member	Group	State	Date	Reason	Replacement	Elected	Group	State
Eva Kaili	S&D	Greece	December 2022	Expelled following her arrest amid Qatar corruption scandal investigation	Marc Angel	January 2023	S&D	Luxembourg
Michal Šimečka	RE	Slovakia	October 2023	Gave up his EP mandate to lead the domestic opposition following the 2023 Slovak parliamentary election	Martin Hojsík	October 2023	RE	Slovakia
Nicola Beer	RE	Germany	December 2023	Gave up her EP mandate on appointment as European Investment Bank vice-president	Jan-Christoph Oetjen	January 2024	RE	Germany

== 10th Parliament ==
=== 16 July 2024 to present ===
Elected in order of precedence:

	Members	Group	State	Votes
1	Sabine Verheyen	EPP	Germany	604, Round 1
2	Ewa Kopacz	EPP	Poland	572, Round 1
3	Esteban González Pons	EPP	Spain	478, Round 1
4	Katarina Barley	S&D	Germany	450, Round 1
5	Pina Picierno	S&D (Renew since 2026)	Italy	405, Round 1
6	Victor Negrescu	S&D	Romania	394, Round 1
7	Martin Hojsík	Renew	Slovakia	393, Round 1
8	Christel Schaldemose	S&D	Denmark	378, Round 1
9	Javi López Fernandez	S&D	Spain	377, Round 1
10	Sophie Wilmès	Renew	Belgium	371, Round 1
11	Nicolae Ştefănuță	Greens/EFA	Romania	347, Round 1
12	Antonella Sberna	ECR	Italy	314, Round 2
13	Roberts Zīle	ECR	Latvia	490, Round 2
14	Younous Omarjee	The Left	France	311, Round 2
