= Jan-Christoph Oetjen =

German politician (born 1978)

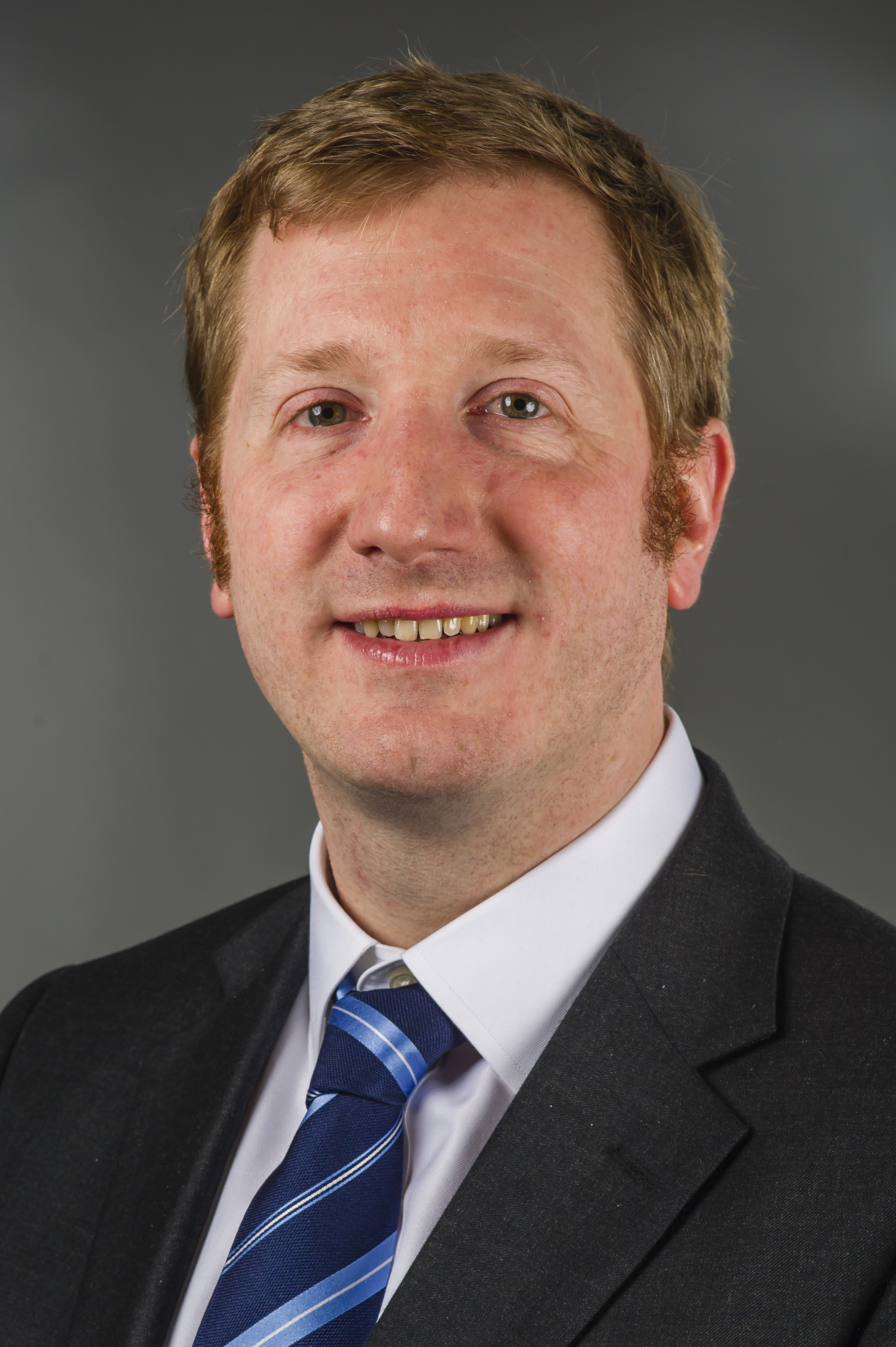

Vice-President of the European Parliament
- In office 16 January 2024 – 15 July 2024 Serving with See List
- President: Roberta Metsola
- Preceded by: Nicola Beer

Member of the European Parliament
- Incumbent
- Assumed office 2019

Personal details
- Born: 21 February 1978 (age 48) Rotenburg an der Wümme, West Germany (now Germany)
- Party: German: Free Democratic Party; EU: Alliance of Liberals and Democrats for Europe
- Education: University of Hannover

Jan-Christoph Oetjen (born 21 February 1978 in Rotenburg an der Wümme) is a German politician of the Free Democratic Party who has been serving as a Member of the European Parliament since 2019. Between January and July 2024, he was one of the Vice-Presidents of the European Parliament under the leadership of President Roberta Metsola, replacing Nicola Beer.

== Early life and education ==
Oetjen studied economics at the University of Hannover.

He was born in Rotenburg.

== Political career ==
=== Career in state politics ===
Oetjen joined the FDP in 1995. He first became a member of the State Parliament of Lower Saxony in the 2003 state elections, and was subsequently re-elected three times. From 2003 until 2011, he served as his parliamentary group's spokesperson on agriculture policy.

=== Member of the European Parliament, 2019–present ===
In October 2018, Oetjen was elected candidate for the 2019 European elections by his party. Since July 2024 (10th parliamentary term), he is active in the following committees and delegations in various functions:

Member:

TRAN - Committee on Transport and Tourism

DACP - Delegation to the ACP–EU Joint Parliamentary Assembly

DAFR - Delegation to the Africa-EU Parliamentary Assembly

DMED - Delegation to the Parliamentary Assembly of the Union for the Mediterranean

Substitute:

LIBE - Committee on Civil Liberties, Justice and Home Affairs

DROI - Subcommittee on Human Rights

DMAS - Delegation for relations with the Mashreq countries

In addition to his committee assignments, Oetjen is also a member of the European Parliament Intergroup on Anti-Racism and Diversity and the European Parliament Intergroup on Seas, Rivers, Islands and Coastal Areas.

== Recognition ==
In March 2024, Oetjen was one of twenty MEPs to be given a "Rising Star" award at The Parliament Magazine's annual MEP Awards.

== Other activities ==
- Sparkasse Rotenburg-Osterholz, Member of the Supervisory Board
