= Dimitrios Papadimoulis =

Greek politician

- Δημήτρης Παπαδημούλης
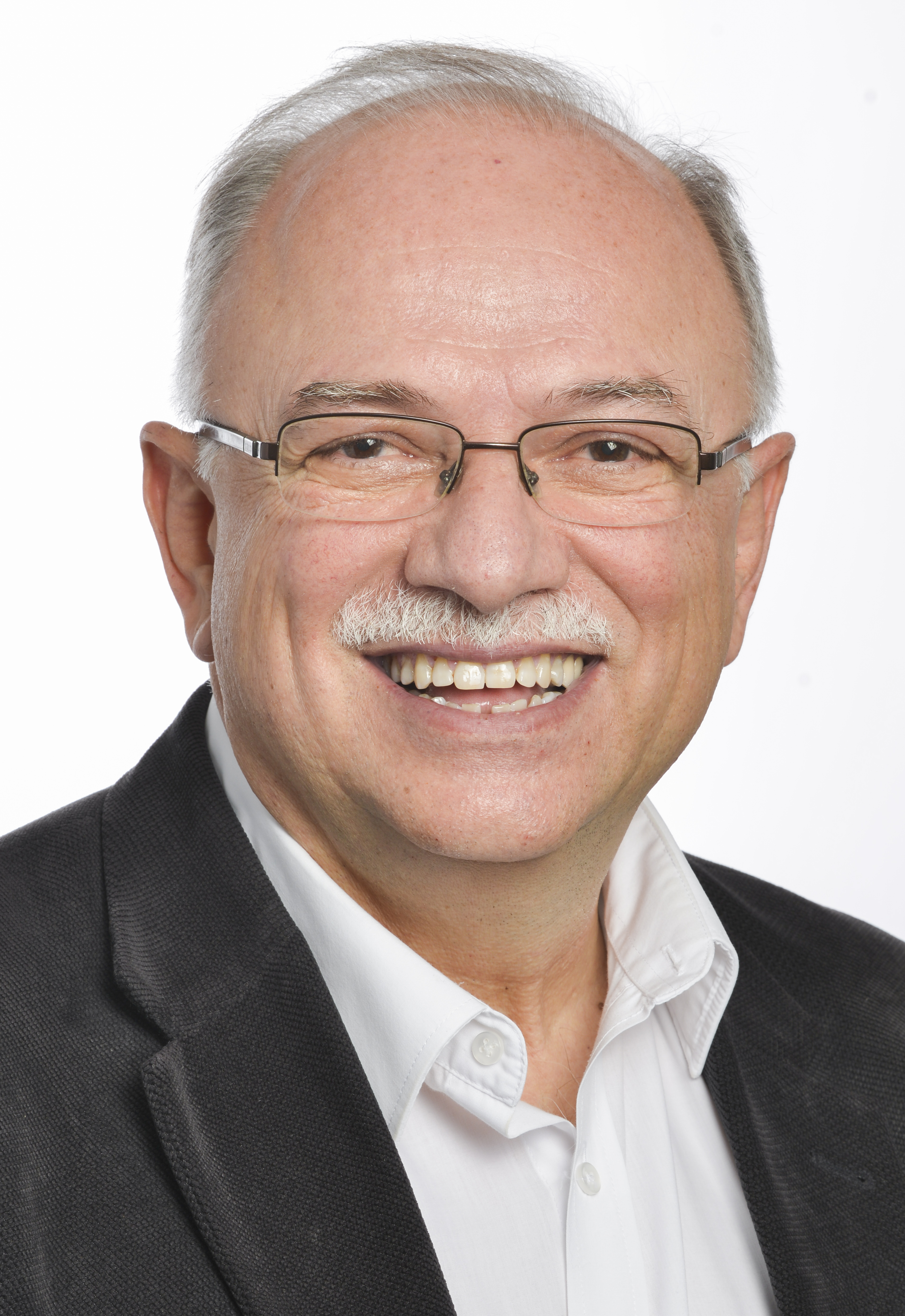
- Papadimoulis in 2014

Vice-President of the European Parliament
- In office 1 July 2014 – 16 July 2024
- President: Martin Schulz; Antonio Tajani; David Sassoli; Roberta Metsola

Member of the European Parliament
- In office 1 July 2014 – 16 July 2024
- In office 20 July 2004 – 13 July 2009
- Constituency: Greece

Member of the Hellenic Parliament
- In office 4 October 2009 – 2 May 2014
- Constituency: Athens B

Personal details
- Born: 21 March 1955 (age 71) Athens, Greece
- Party: New Left (2023–present)
- Other political affiliations: Synaspismos (until 2012); Syriza (2012–2023)
- Education: National Technical University of Athens

Dimitrios Papadimoulis (Greek: Δημήτρης Παπαδημούλης, romanized: Dimítris Papadimoúlis; born 21 March 1955) is a Greek politician and former Member of the European Parliament (MEP) as a member of The Left in the European Parliament – GUE/NGL.

== Personal life ==
Papadimoulis was born in 1955 in Athens. He attended the Varvakeio Junior High School of Athens and studied the School of Civil Engineering of the National Technical University of Athens. He is married to Nadia Soubasaki and has two children.

== Career ==
Papadimoulis was an MEP from 2004 to 2009.

From 2009 to 2014 he was a member of the Greek parliament.

Since 2014, he has again been an MEP. Since 1 July 2014, he has been one of the simultaneous 14 Vice Presidents of the European Parliament. Since 2014, Papadimoulis has been the only Greek Vice President of the European Parliament. According to the VoteWatch.EU, he is the most influential Greek MEP in the European Parliament. In the Parliamentary Evaluation Report on the term 2014–2019, published by "Vote Watch Europe", Dimitris Papadimoulis was evaluated as the Greek MEP with the greatest influence on the European Institutions. In an earlier report by VoteWatch.EU, he was also one of the three most active MEPs in the entire European Parliament, for the period 2004–2009.

On 18 January 2022, he was re-elected as vice-president of the European Parliament for the fourth consecutive time, with the support of a broad cross-party majority and with a 74.77% share of the vote, garnering 492 positive votes out of a total of 658 valid ballots. Since 2014 he was the only Greek and the only representative from the GUE-NGL political group at the Presidium of the European Parliament.

== See also ==
- List of members of the European Parliament for Greece, 2009–14
- Political groups of the European Parliament
