= Rainer Wieland =

German politician (born 1957)

Rainer Wieland MEP
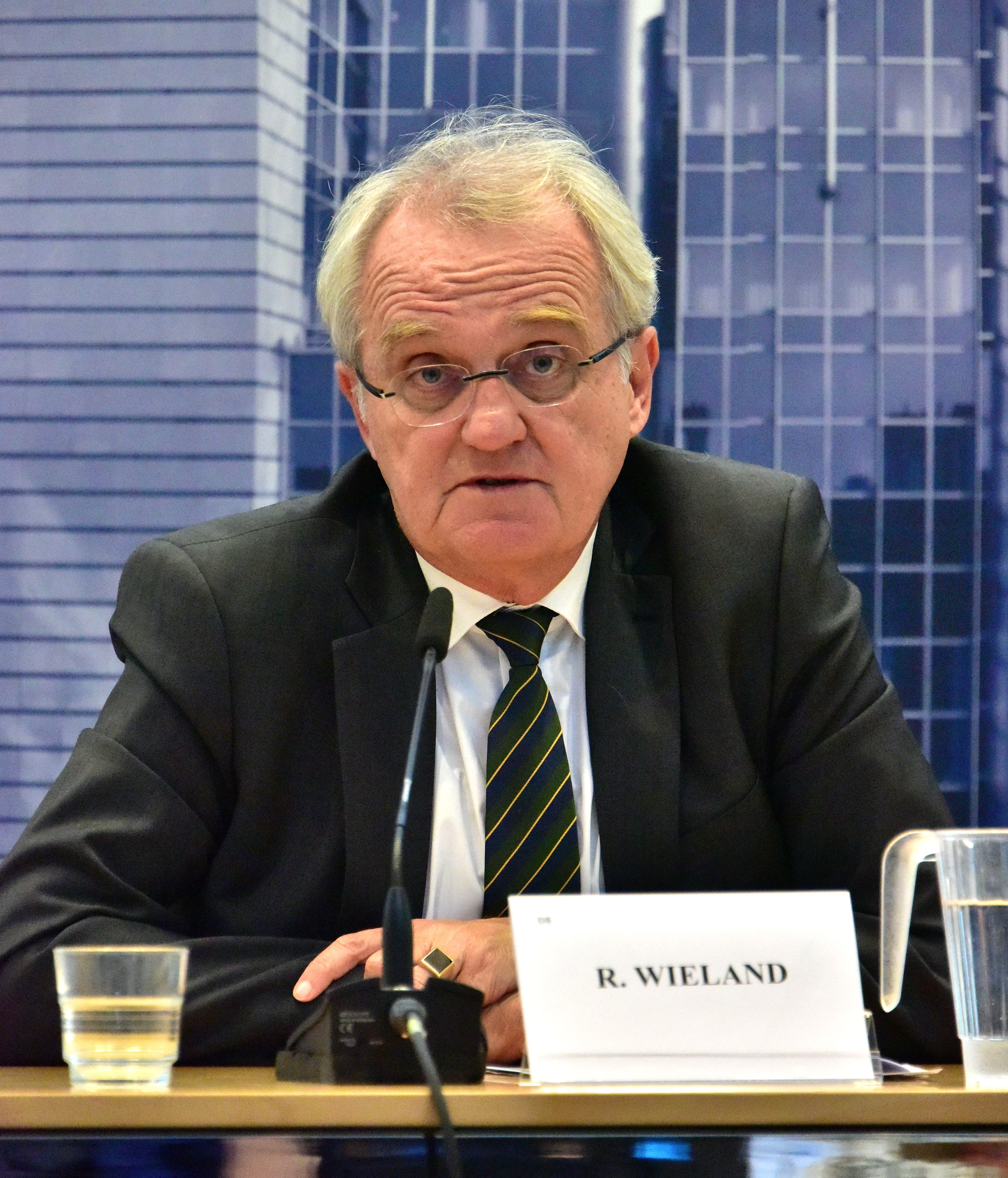

Vice-President of the European Parliament
- In office 14 July 2009 – 16 July 2024
- President: Jerzy Buzek; Martin Schulz; Gianni Pittella (Acting); Antonio Tajani; David Sassoli; Roberta Metsola

Member of the European Parliament
- In office 1997–2024
- Constituency: Germany

Personal details
- Born: 19 February 1957 (age 69) Stuttgart, West Germany
- Party: German; Christian Democratic Union; EU; European People's Party
- Education: University of Heidelberg
- Website: www.mdep.de

Rainer Wieland (born 19 February 1957) is a German politician who served as a member of the European Parliament (MEP) for Germany from 1997 to 2024. He is a member of the Christian Democratic Union, part of the European People's Party. He was also one of the Parliament's vice-presidents from 2009. His area of responsibility as an MEP included the Stuttgart administrative district. From 2011 to 2025, Wieland was likewise president of the non-partisan Europa-Union Deutschland (Union of European Federalists Germany).

== Education and profession ==
Wieland studied law in Tübingen and Heidelberg and completed his legal clerkship in Stuttgart.

Wieland is a lawyer. He is founding partner of the law firm "Theumer, Wieland & Weisenburger" in Stuttgart, which was established in 1992. There he is responsible for European law and family law.

== Political career ==
=== Party ===
Wieland is a member of the conservative Christian Democratic Union, part of the European People's Party.

In the Young Christian Democrats Gerlingen, Wieland was local chairman from 1975 to 1980 and chairman of the Young Christian Democrats Ludwigsburg from 1981 to 1983. From 1985 to 1988 he was deputy district chairman of the Young Christian Democrats Nord-Württemberg and from 1990 to 1992 deputy state chairman of the Young Christian Democrats Baden-Württemberg.

Wieland was a member of the CDU federal party committee from 1983 to 1991, and has been a member of the executive committee of the CDU Nord-Württemberg since 1991. He has been chairman of the CDU Ludwigsburg since 1993. Furthermore, he is a member of the presidium of CDU Baden-Württemberg.

In terms of local politics, Rainer Wieland was a member of the municipal council of the city of Gerlingen from 1984 to 1998 and the district council of Ludwigsburg County from 1994 to 1998. He has been a member of the regional assembly of the Verband Region Stuttgart since 1994.

In the non-partisan regional section of UEF Baden-Württemberg, he was chairman from 2001 to 2013 and was a member of the ZDF Television Council as a representative of the UEF from 2006 to 2016. From 2011 to 2025, Wieland was President of Europa-Union Deutschland (UEF Germany). Complementary to his parliamentary work, Wieland is also a member of the non-partisan UEF Parliamentary Group of the European Parliament. From 2008 to 2011, Wieland was vice president of the European Movement International.

=== Member of the European Parliament ===
Wieland belonged as a Member of the European Parliament of the CDU to the Group of the European People's Party (Christian Democrats), which represents the largest group in the European Parliament. Most recently, Rainer Wieland was again elected to the European Parliament in May 2019 from position 1 on the CDU state list of Baden-Württemberg.

As an MEP, Wieland was responsible for the Stuttgart administrative district, including the state capital Stuttgart and the surrounding counties of Böblingen, Esslingen, Göppingen, Heidenheim, Heilbronn, Ludwigsburg, Schwäbisch Hall, Hohenlohekreis, Main-Tauber-Kreis, Ostalbkreis and Rems-Murr-Kreis.

He was a member of the Committee on Constitutional Affairs and the Committee on Budgets. Wieland is a full member of the ACP–EU Joint Parliamentary Assembly (ACP-EU). He is a deputy in the Committee on Petitions and in the delegation for relations with Bosnia and Herzegovina and Kosovo. He was also a member of the Kangaroo Group.

He was also chairman of the regional group of CDU deputies from Baden-Württemberg in the European Parliament and a member of the EPP Group's executive committee.

In January 2022, Wieland came under criticism when it became known that he had his workplace converted for almost 630,000 euros, according to an overview of the parliamentary administration. The modernization was said to have taken place as part of an "ideas laboratory" to test new office technology.

Wieland lost re-election as an MEP in 2024. In March 2026 he declined a return to Strasbourg.

=== Vice President of the European Parliament ===
From 2009 to 2024 Wieland was one of the 14 Vice Presidents of the European Parliament, with special responsibility for buildings, budget, transport, environment-conscious Parliament, European Political Parties as well as relations with the French, Belgian and Luxembourg authorities on the seat and places of work of the Parliament. In this capacity, Wieland was a member of the Parliament's Bureau and replacing the President for Africa and the ACP (African, Caribbean and Pacific) group.

== Honorary offices and memberships ==
Wieland is a member of several local associations in his home country. In the Theaterhaus Stuttgart, he is Member of the Board of Trustees. Furthermore, he has been committed to the Balkan region for years, be it through visits on site or support for student exchanges with schools from Baden-Württemberg.

== Awards and honors ==
- 2009: Federal Cross of Merit with ribbon
- 2018: Honorary citizen of the Kosovar city of Drenas
- 2021: Order of Merit of the State of Baden-Württemberg

== Personal life ==
Wieland is married and has two children.
