= Fabio Massimo Castaldo =

Italian politician (born 1985)

Fabio Massimo Castaldo MEP
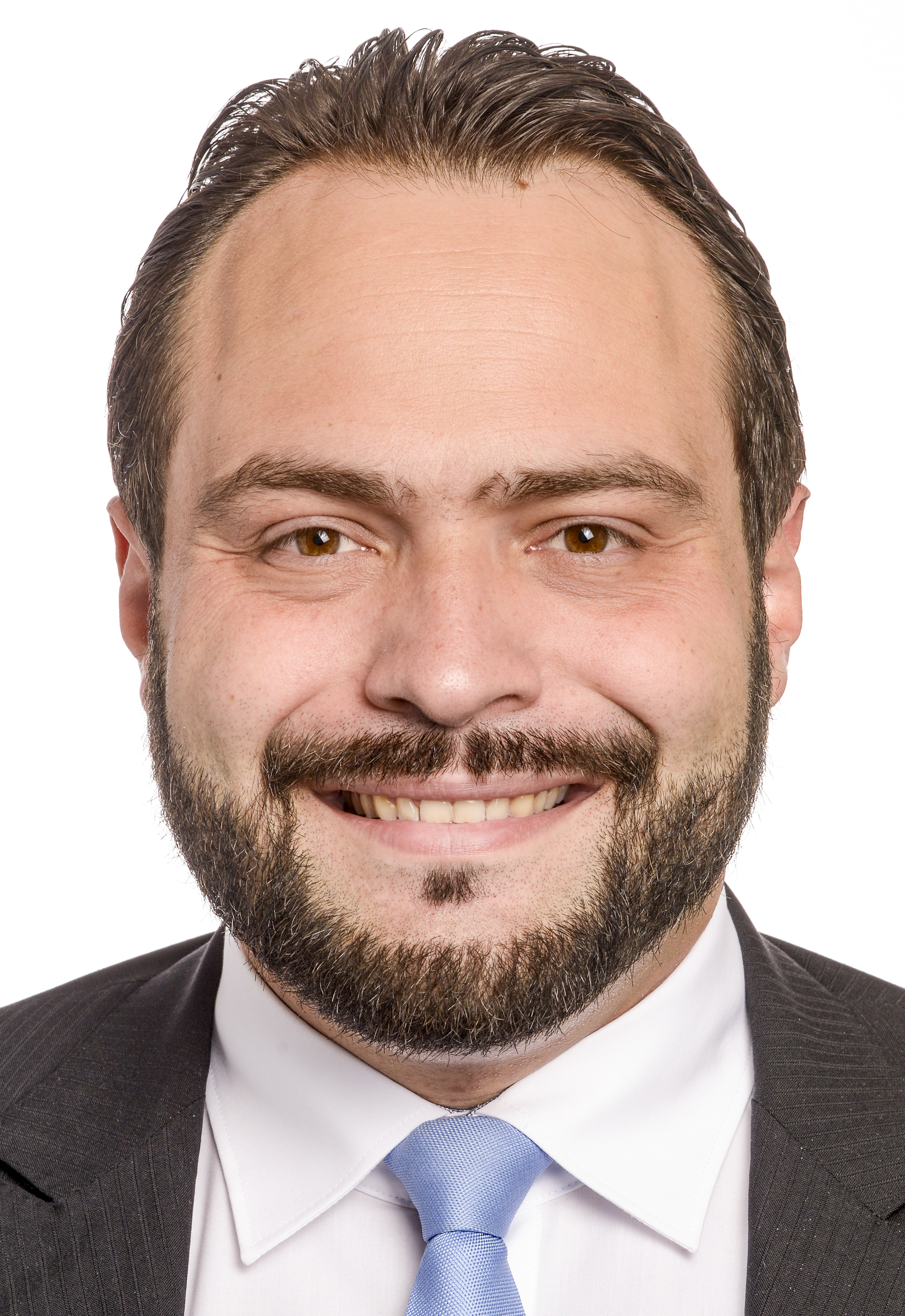

Member of the European Parliament; for Central Italy
- Incumbent
- Assumed office 2 July 2014

Vice-President of the European Parliament
- In office 15 November 2017 – 18 January 2022
- President: Antonio Tajani; David Sassoli; Roberta Metsola (acting)

Personal details
- Born: 18 September 1985 (age 41) Rome, Italy
- Party: Action (2024–present)
- Other political affiliations: Five Star Movement (2013–2024)
- Education: University of Rome Tor Vergata
- Occupation: Practising lawyer

Fabio Massimo Castaldo (born 18 September 1985) is an Italian politician who has served in the European Parliament since 2014. On 15 November 2017, he was elected Vice-President of the European Parliament; in doing so, he replaced Alexander Graf Lambsdorff and became the youngest vice-president in the history of the institution. As a member of the European Parliament (MEP), he sat on the Europe of Freedom and Direct Democracy parliamentary group from 1 July 2014 to 15 October 2014, and again from 20 October 2014 and 1 July 2019, and was a non-attached member (Non-Inscrits) from 16 October 2014 to 19 October 2014.

Castaldo was re-elected in the 2019 European Parliament election in Italy. On 3 July 2019, he was re-elected vice-president of the European Parliament, running as an independent with the support of over forty MEPs belonging to various political groups, as the European delegation of the Five Star Movement (M5S) belonged to the technical grouping of the Non-Inscrits. His election represented the second success of an independent candidate following the 2009 election of Edward McMillan-Scott, who was elected with the Conservative Party and sat with European Conservatives and Reformists (ECR) but successfully stood as an independent candidate against ECR's official candidate and was expelled; although he joined the Liberal Democrats, McMillan-Scott sat as a non-attached MEP. Castaldo remains a non-attached MEP for the M5S. In July 2023, he denied rumours that he would switch to Forza Italia of the European People's Party on the grounds that M5S leader Giuseppe Conte allegedly excluded him for the list of candidates for the 2024 European Parliament election in Italy.
