= Petra Kammerevert =

German politician (1966–2025)

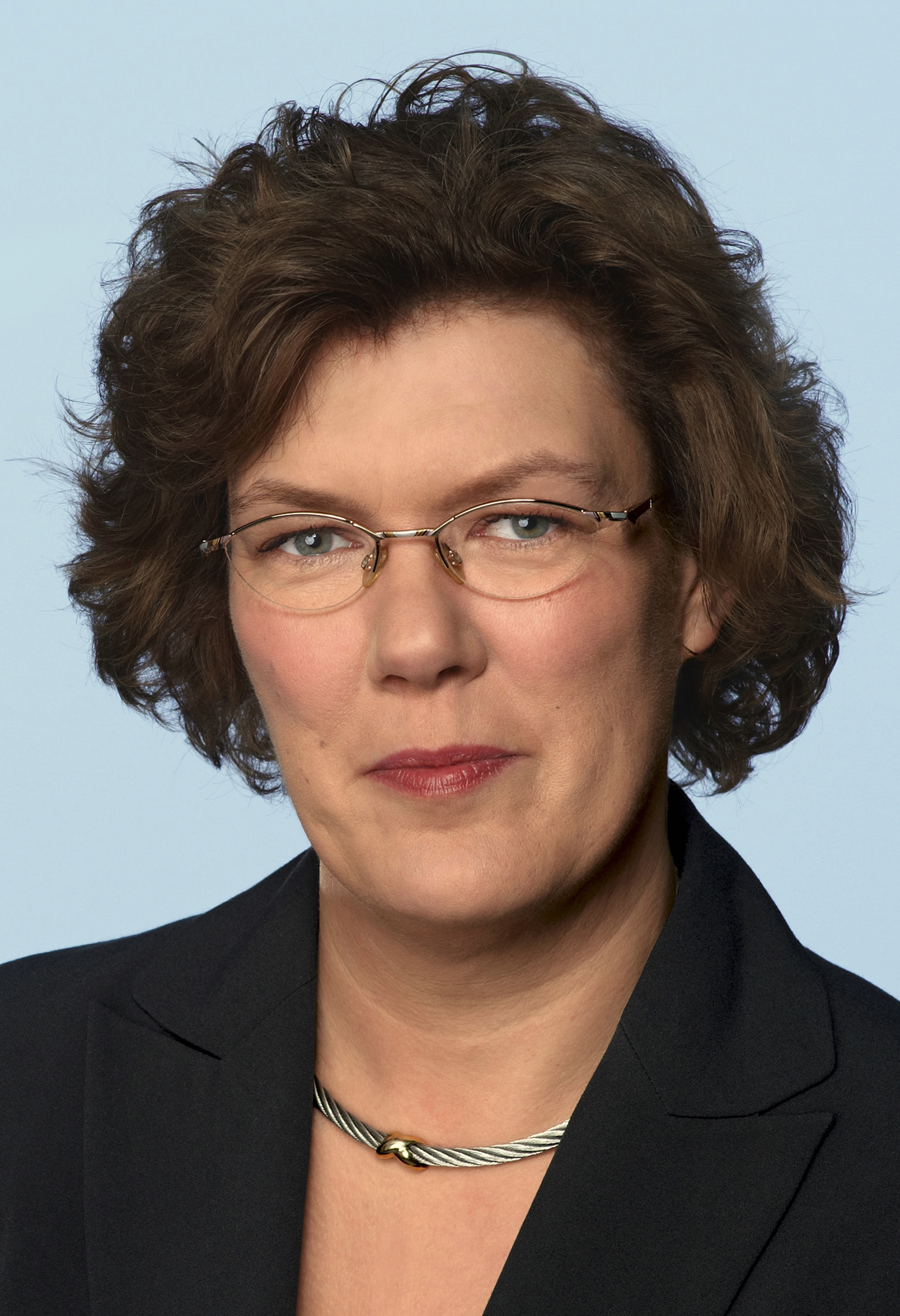
- Kammerevert in 2010

Member of the European Parliament
- In office 14 July 2009 – 15 July 2024
- Constituency: Germany

Personal details
- Born: 1 June 1966 Duisburg, North Rhine-Westphalia, West Germany
- Died: 18 October 2025 (aged 59)
- Party: German: Social Democratic Party; EU: Party of European Socialists
- Education: University of Duisburg
- Website: www.kammerevert.eu

Petra Luise Kammerevert (1 June 1966 – 18 October 2025) was a German politician who served as a Member of the European Parliament (MEP) from 2009 until 2024. She was a member of the Social Democratic Party of Germany, part of the Party of European Socialists.

== Education and professional experience ==
Following her Abitur in Düsseldorf in 1985, Kammerevert studied sociology and political science at the University of Duisburg-Essen, graduating with a degree in Social Sciences.

Between 1992 and 2002, Kammerevert worked as a scientific adviser to a Member of the European Parliament, spending the first eighteen months in Brussels and the remainder in Düsseldorf. From 2002 to 2009 she worked as a consultant for the ARD public service broadcasting company.

== Political career ==
Kammerevert joined the Social Democratic Party of Germany in 1984 and initially participated as a board member of the Young Socialists in the SPD's Lower Rhine regional group between 1987 and 1990. In 1992 she assumed the chair of the Young Socialists in the SPD Düsseldorf, an office which she retained until 1995. Since 1997, she has been a member of the executive committee of the SPD Düsseldorf. Between 1999 and 2009, she was a member of the municipal council of Düsseldorf. Since 2004, she has also been a member of the executive committee of the SPD Lower Rhine region. Since 2012, Kammerevert has been a member of the SPD leadership in North Rhine-Westphalia under successive chairs Hannelore Kraft (2012–2017), Michael Groschek (2017–2018), Sebastian Hartmann (2018–2021) and Thomas Kutschaty (2021–2023).

== Member of the European Parliament, 2009–2024 ==
In the 2009 European Parliament election, Kammerevert was elected as a Member of the European Parliament on the Social Democratic Party of Germany list for North Rhine-Westphalia. As such, she sat in the Progressive Alliance of Socialists and Democrats parliamentary group. Her "constituency" comprises Düsseldorf, Krefeld, Mettmann, Mönchengladbach, Neuss, Remscheid, Solingen and Wuppertal.

In the European Parliament, Kammerevert worked as a member of the Committee on Culture and Education, which is also responsible for media, information, youth and sports policy. She served as her parliamentary group's coordinator on the committee from 2014 until 2017 and as its chairwoman from 2017 until 2019. Alongside Sabine Verheyen, Kammerevert was selected in 2016 as co-rapporteurs on the audio-visual media services directive, which seeks to introduce levies and cultural quotas on services like Netflix. She also served as her parliamentary group’s main negotiator on the European Media Freedom Act.

In addition to her committee assignments, Kammerevert was a substitute member of the Committee on Transport and Tourism and of the EU-Croatia Joint Parliamentary Committee. She was also a member of the Transatlantic Legislators' Dialogue (TLD), and the European Parliament Intergroup on the Digital Agenda. On the national level, she was a member of the executive committee of the SPD's commission on media.

== Other activities ==
- Westdeutscher Rundfunk (WDR), Member of the Broadcasting Council (since 2009)
- Fortuna Düsseldorf, Member
- Düsseldorfer EG, Member

== Personal life and death ==
Kammerevert was married and, together with one adult stepson, lived in Düsseldorf. Kammerevert died on 18 October 2025 after a serious illness at the age of 59.
