= Wiebke Knell =

German politician (born 1981)

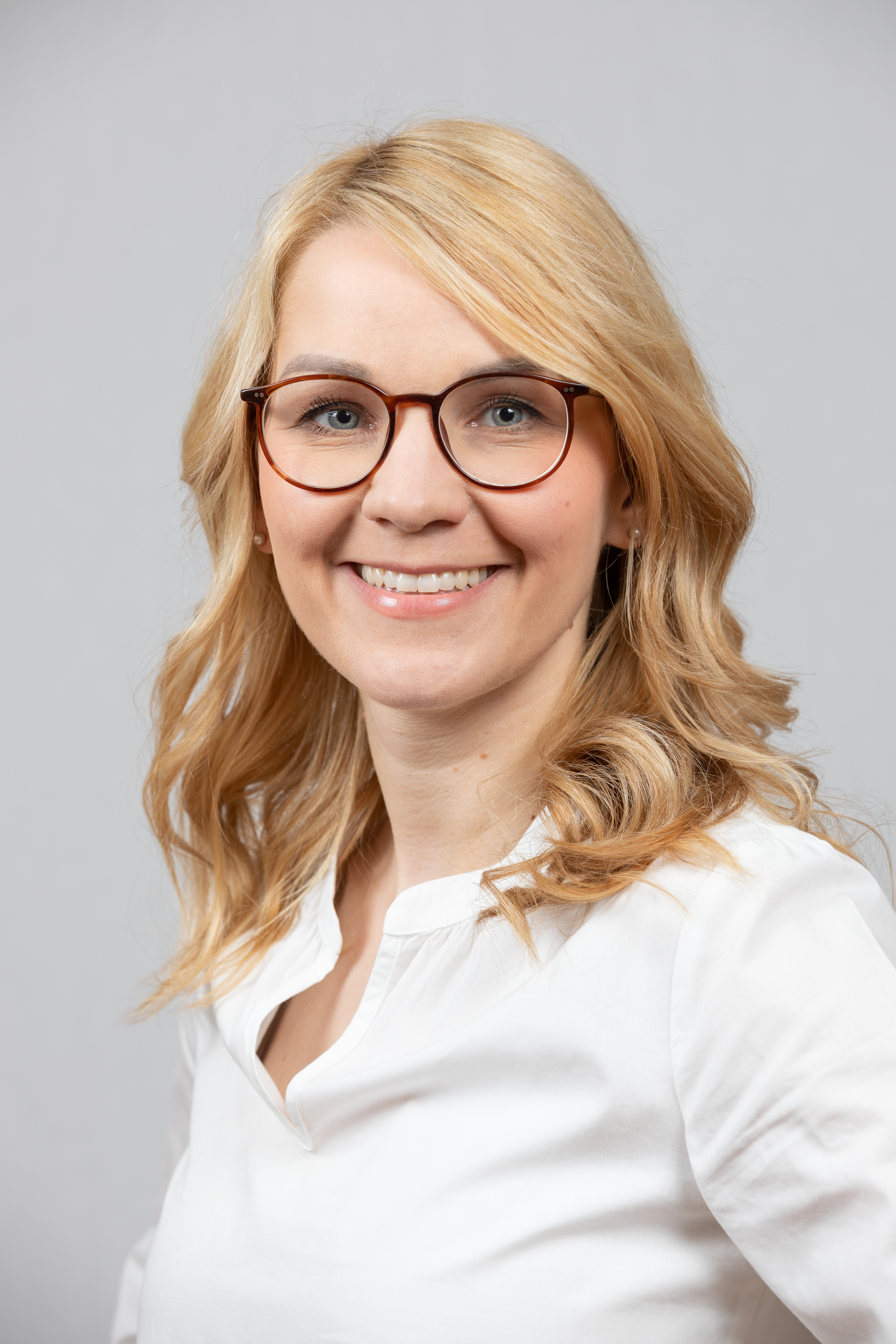
- Knell in 2019

Member of the Landtag of Hesse
- Incumbent
- Assumed office 1 November 2017
- Preceded by: Nicola Beer

Personal details
- Born: 24 October 1981 (age 44) Schwalmstadt
- Party: Free Democratic Party (since 1998)

Wiebke Knell (born 24 October 1981 in Schwalmstadt) is a German politician serving as a member of the Landtag of Hesse since 2017. She has served as co-group leader of the Free Democratic Party since 2024.
