= Sabine Verheyen =

German architect and politician (born 1964)

Sabine Verheyen MEP
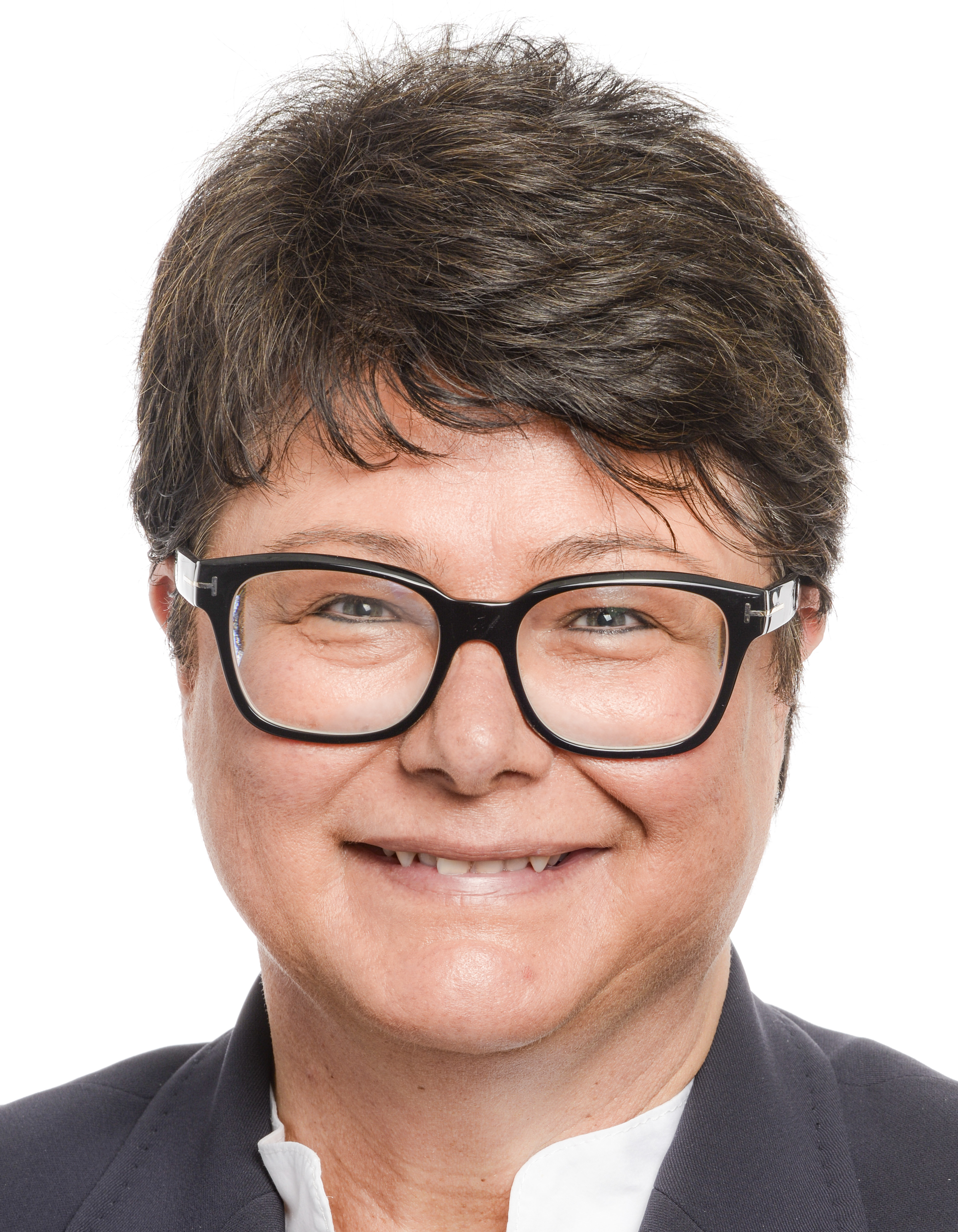
- Official portrait, 2019

First Vice-President of the European Parliament
- Incumbent
- Assumed office 16 July 2024
- President: Roberta Metsola
- Preceded by: Othmar Karas

Member of the European Parliament
- Incumbent
- Assumed office 1 July 2009
- Constituency: Germany

Personal details
- Born: 24 October 1964 (age 61) Aachen, West Germany
- Party: Germany: Christian Democratic Union; EU: European People's Party
- Education: FH Aachen
- Website: www.sabine-verheyen.de

Sabine Verheyen (born 24 October 1964) is a German architect and politician who has served as the First Vice-President of the European Parliament since July 2024, having been a Member of the European Parliament (MEP) since 2009. She is a member of the Christian Democratic Union, part of the European People's Party.

== Education and personal life ==
Sabine Verheyen was born in Aachen. From 1983 to 1988, Verheyen studied architecture at the Aachen University of Applied Sciences. She is married and has three children.

In Brussels, Verheyen has been sharing an apartment with fellow parliamentarian Monika Hohlmeier since 2009.

== Political career ==
=== Career in local politics ===
Verheyen joined the Christian Democratic Union (CDU) in 1990. Since 2001 she has been a member of the leadership of the CDU in North Rhine-Westphalia and since 2002 a member of the Regional Executive Committee of the CDU Municipal Policy Association (KPV).

From 1994 to 2009 Verheyen was a member of the city council of Aachen. From 1999 to 2009 she was mayor of Aachen and member of the Euregio Council.

=== Member of the European Parliament, 2009–present ===
In the 2009 elections, Verheyen was elected to the European Parliament. She has since served as a member of the Committee on Culture and Education; since 2019, she has been its chairwoman. On the committee, Verheyen serves as the European People's Party Group’s coordinator from 2014 until 2019. Alongside Petra Kammerevert, she was selected in 2016 as co-rapporteur on the audio-visual media services directive, which sought to introduce levies and cultural quotas on services like Netflix. In 2020, she also joined the Special Committee on Foreign Interference in all Democratic Processes in the European Union.

In addition to her committee assignments, Verheyen is a member of the Parliament's Delegation for relations with South Africa. Between 2009 and 2014, she also served as a substitute member on the Committee on Regional Development and the Delegation for relations with Iran. She is also a member of the European Internet Forum, the European Parliament Intergroup on the Digital Agenda and of the European Parliament Intergroup on Children's Rights.

In October 2021, Verheyen was elected as one of five deputies of Hendrik Wüst as chair of the CDU in North Rhine-Westphalia.

Verheyen was nominated by her party as delegate to the Federal Convention for the purpose of electing the President of Germany in 2022.

In the negotiations to form a coalition government of the CDU and Green Party under Minister-President of North Rhine-Westphalia Hendrik Wüst following the 2022 state elections, Verheyen led her party’s delegation in the working group on cultural affairs, media and sports.

== Other activities ==
- Caritas-Gemeinschaftsstiftung für das Bistum Aachen, member of the board of trustees
- European Internet Foundation, member of the steering committee
- Westdeutscher Rundfunk (WDR), alternate member of the broadcasting council

== Political positions ==
Ahead of the 2021 Christian Democratic Union of Germany leadership election, Verheyen publicly endorsed Armin Laschet to succeed Annegret Kramp-Karrenbauer as the party’s chair.
