= Nicola Beer =

Vice President of the European Parliament

Nicola Beer MEP
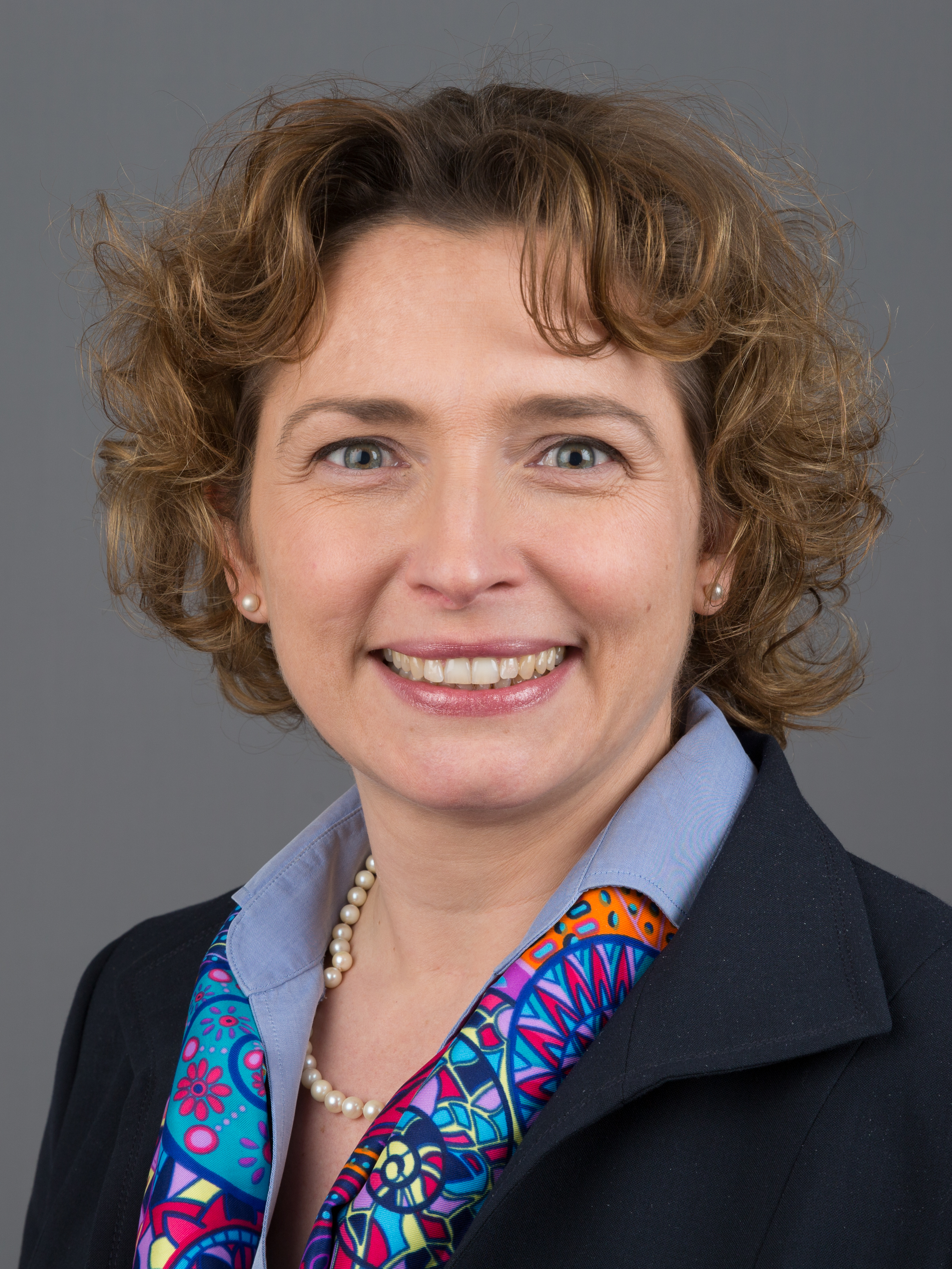
- Beer in 2016

Vice-President of the European Parliament
- In office 2 July 2019 – 31 December 2023 Serving with See List
- President: David Sassoli; Roberta Metsola

Deputy Leader of the Free Democratic Party
- In office 26 April 2019 – 22 April 2023 Serving with Wolfgang Kubicki and Johannes Vogel
- Leader: Christian Lindner
- Preceded by: Marie-Agnes Strack-Zimmermann
- Succeeded by: Bettina Stark-Watzinger

General Secretary of the Free Democratic Party
- In office 7 December 2013 – 26 April 2019
- Leader: Christian Lindner
- Preceded by: Patrick Döring
- Succeeded by: Linda Teuteberg

Member of the European Parliament
- In office 2 July 2019 – 31 December 2023
- Succeeded by: Michael Kauch
- Constituency: Germany

Member of the Bundestag for Hesse
- In office 24 October 2017 – 30 June 2019
- Succeeded by: Peter Heidt
- Constituency: FDP List

Minister of Education and Religious Affairs of Hesse
- In office 31 May 2012 – 18 January 2014
- Prime Minister: Volker Bouffier
- Preceded by: Dorothea Henzler
- Succeeded by: R. Alexander Lorz

State Secretary for Justice, Integration and European Affairs of Hesse
- In office 5 February 2009 – 31 May 2012
- Prime Minister: Roland Koch; Volker Bouffier
- Preceded by: Thomas Schäfer (Justice)
- Succeeded by: Zsuzsa Breier

Member of the Landtag of Hesse
- In office 18 January 2014 – 31 October 2017
- Succeeded by: Wiebke Knell
- In office 5 April 1999 – 5 February 2009
- Succeeded by: Jochen Paulus

Personal details
- Born: 23 January 1970 (age 56) Wiesbaden, West Germany
- Party: German: Free Democratic Party; EU: Alliance of Liberals and Democrats for Europe
- Education: University of Frankfurt

Nicola Gertrud Ruth Beer (born 23 January 1970) is a German lawyer and politician of the Free Democratic Party (FDP) who has been serving as a vice president of the European Investment Bank since 2024, under the leadership of president Nadia Calviño.

Earlier in her career, Beer was a Member of the European Parliament from 2019 to 2023, where she served as one of its Vice-Presidents. She previously was a member of the Bundestag from 2017 to 2019 and part of her party's leadership.

== Early life and career ==
Beer finished highschool with a bilingual degree in German and French in 1989. She went on to do an apprenticeship at Deutsche Bank from 1989 to 1991 before studying law at the University of Frankfurt from 1991 until 1997.

== Political career ==
=== Career in state politics ===
Beer became a member of the FDP in 1991. She was first elected as member of the State Parliament of Hesse in the 1999 state elections. Between 2008 and 2009, she served as deputy chairperson of the FDP parliamentary group, under the leadership of chairman Jörg-Uwe Hahn.

In the cabinets of minister-presidents Roland Koch and Volker Bouffier, Beer served as State Secretary for European Affairs at the Hessian State Ministry of Justice between 2009 and 2012. In this capacity, she represented Hesse on the European Committee of the Regions. Between 2012 and 2014 she was State Minister of Education and Cultural Affairs in Hesse. During her time in office, Beer was one of several politicians, professors and teachers who successfully pushed for German public schools offering classes in Islam to primary school students using state-trained teachers and specially written textbooks.

=== Career in national politics ===
Beer was a FDP delegate to the Federal Convention for the purpose of electing the President of Germany in 2004, 2009, 2010, 2012 and 2017.

In late 2013, incoming FDP chairman Christian Lindner nominated Beer for the office of Secretary General; on 7 December 2013 she got elected (with 84.3% of all votes. At the political convention of the FDP on 15 May 2015 she got reelected with 88.4% of all votes.

=== Member of the German Parliament, 2017–2019 ===
Ahead of the 2017 elections, Beer was elected to lead her party’s campaign in the state of Hesse. In the – unsuccessful – negotiations to form a coalition government with the Christian Democrats – both the Christian Democratic Union (CDU) and the Christian Social Union in Bavaria (CSU) – and the Green Party, she was part of her party's delegation. She later became a member of the Committee on Education, Research and Technology Assessment.

=== Member of the European Parliament, 2019–2023 ===
In September 2018, Beer announced that she would lead the FDP list and run for a parliamentary seat in the 2019 European elections. Led by Margrethe Vestager, she was among the seven-strong “Team Europe” that the centrist Alliance of Liberals and Democrats for Europe Party picked to spearhead its pro-EU, liberal campaign ahead of the elections. Shortly before the vote, she joined 70 current and former EU leaders – including all the main parties’ lead candidates – calling for a female president of the European Commission or European Council and a gender-balanced leadership.

Following her election, Beer was part of a cross-party working group in charge of drafting the European Parliament's four-year work program on digitization. In parliament, she served as a Vice-President; she was part of its leadership under Presidents David Sassoli (2019–2022) and Roberta Metsola (2022–2023). She also joined the Committee on Industry, Research and Energy, where she has served as rapporteur on the Critical Raw Materials Act. From 2021, she was part of the Parliament's delegation to the Conference on the Future of Europe.

From 2019 to 2023, Beer served as one of the three deputies of Christian Lindner in his capacity as FDP chairman.

In the negotiations to form a so-called traffic light coalition of the Social Democrats (SPD), the Green Party and the FDP following the 2021 federal elections, Beer led her party's delegation in the working group on European affairs; her co-chairs from the other parties were Udo Bullmann and Franziska Brantner.

== Later career ==
In 2023, Beer was nominated by the government of Chancellor Olaf Scholz to become one of the vice-presidents of the European Investment Bank (EIB).

== Other activities ==
- International Martin Luther Foundation, Member of the Board of Trustees (since 2018)
- Association of Private Higher Education Institutions (VPH), Member of the Board of Trustees (since 2015)
- World Vision Deutschland, Member of the Board of Trustees (since 2015)
- Heraeus Bildungsstiftung, Member of the Advisory Board (since 2014)
- Deutsche Industrieforschungsgemeinschaft Konrad Zuse, Member of the Senate
- Deutsche Stiftung Frauengesundheit, Member of the Board of Trustees
- Hessenpark, Member of the Advisory Board
- Max Planck Institute for European Legal History, Member of the Board of Trustees
- Museum of World Cultures, Member of the Board of Trustees
- Stiftung Lesen, Member of the Board of Trustees
- German-French Lawyers’ Association (DFJ), Member
- German-Israeli Association (DIG), Member
- Johanniter-Unfall-Hilfe (JUH), Member
- ZDF, Member of the Television Council (2015-2016)

== Political positions ==
Beer has repeatedly publicly denied the consensus of climate science on extreme weather events. For example, Beer spoke in a tweet in 2017 of the "alleged occurrence of more extreme weather events" using the hashtag "#Fakenews". In a statement, Beer described the "causality of extreme weather situations and climate change" as "scientifically refuted". In contrast to Beer's statement, the greater magnitude and probability of "extreme weather events" has been deemed to be linked to human activity since the IPCC Sixth Assessment Report.

Beer has been an outspoken proponent of Taiwan’s independence; in 2022, she made an official trip to Taipeh and met with President Tsai Ing-wen.

== Personal life ==
Beer is a mother of twins. In 2001, she separated from the children's father, fellow FDP politician Volker Stein. Since 2018, she has been married to lawyer Jürgen Illing.

== Literature ==
- Beer, Nicola, Internationales Biographisches Archiv 36/2012 from 4 September 2012, in Munzinger-Archive (Beginning of the article available for free)
