= Antonios Trakatellis =

Greek biochemist and politician

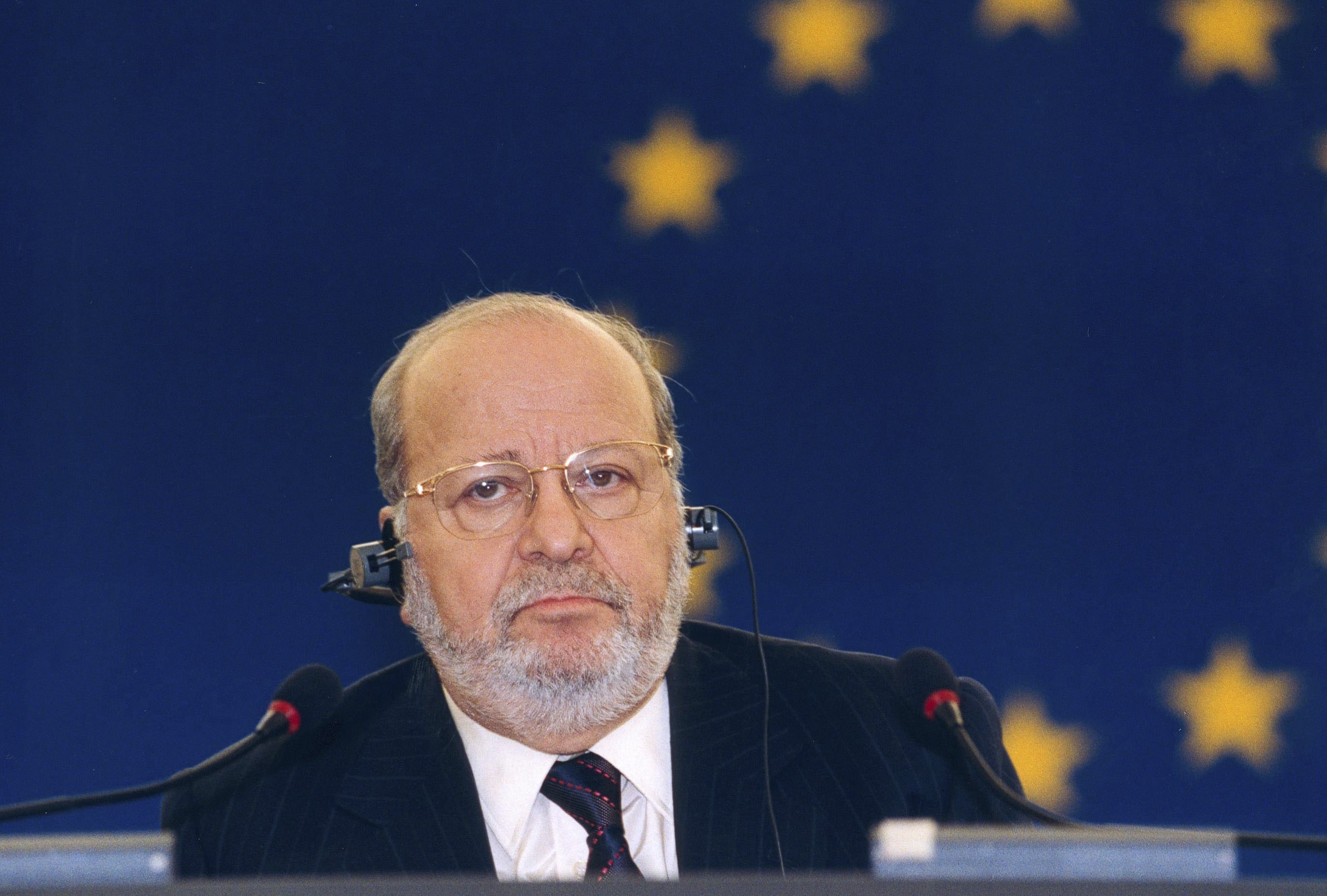
Antonios Trakatellis in 2012

Antonios Trakatellis (Greek: Αντώνιος Τρακατέλλης) (born 4 September 1931 in Thessaloniki) is a Greek Member of the European Parliament (MEP), and an academic biochemist. He was elected on the New Democracy ticket and sits with the European People's Party group. He has been leader of the ND parliamentary group since 2000.

Trakatellis has been a lecturer at several Greek and American universities, and was Rector of the Aristotle University of Thessaloniki 1988-1994. He has published a large number of papers and books concerning insulin, nucleic acids, proteins and vitamin B_{6} deficiency.

On 20 July 2004 he was elected one of the 14 Vice-Presidents of the European Parliament, ending his mandate on 15 January 2007.

He is the brother of Demetrios, former Archbishop of America.
