= Sylvia-Yvonne Kaufmann =

German politician

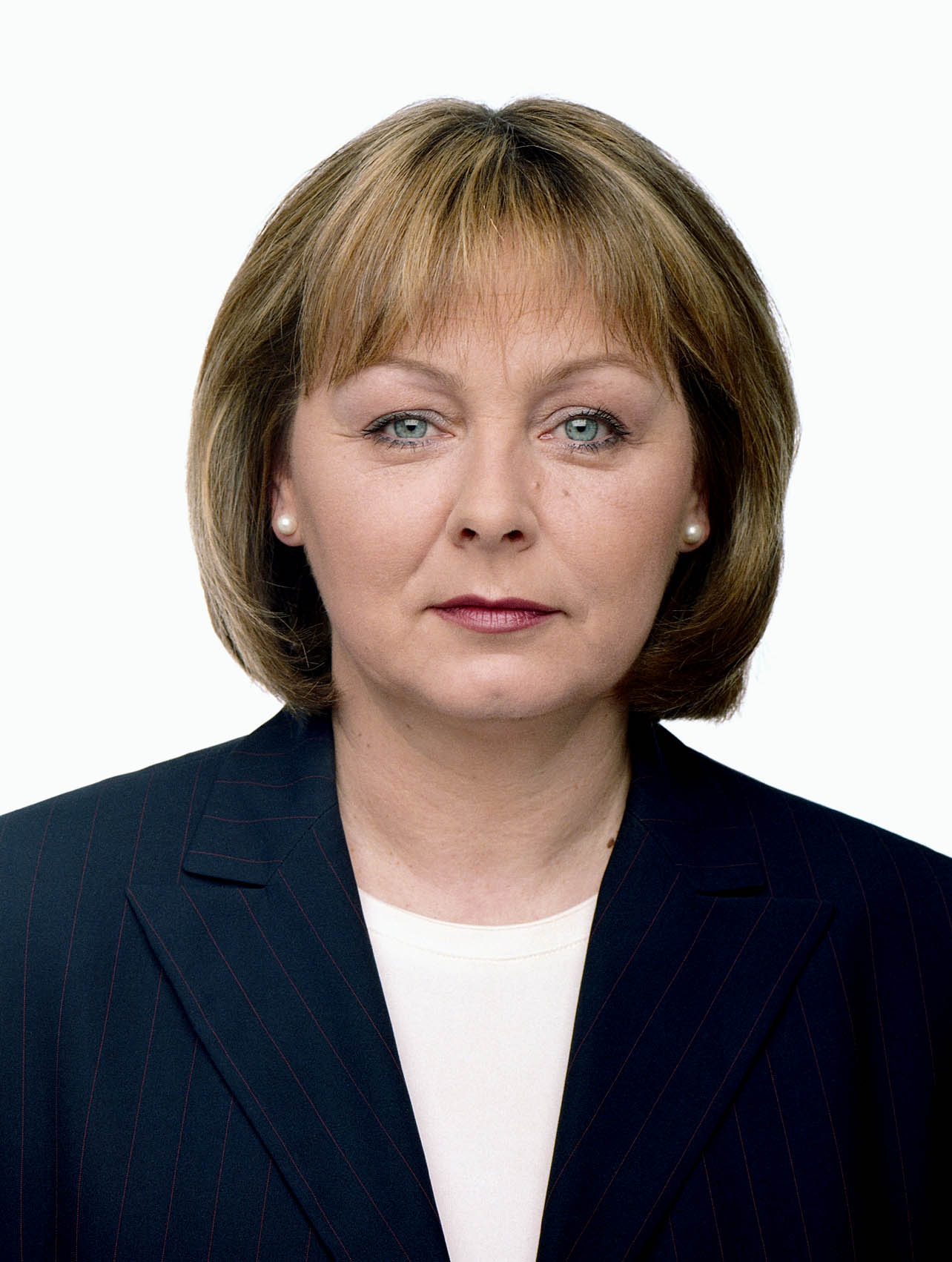

Member of the European Parliament
- In office 1 July 2004 – 2019
- Constituency: Germany

Personal details
- Born: Sylvia-Yvonne Kaufmann; 23 January 1955 (age 71) Berlin, Germany
- Party: German; Social Democratic Party; EU; Party of European Socialists
- Education: University of Berlin
- Website: www.sylvia-yvonne-kaufmann.de

Sylvia-Yvonne Kaufmann (born 23 January 1955) is a German politician who served as a Member of the European Parliament (MEP) from 1999 to 2009, and from 2014 to 2019. She is a member of the Social Democratic Party, part of the Party of European Socialists.

Kaufmann is a qualified Japanologist. She was Deputy Chairman of the PDS 1993–2000 and sat in the Volkskammer of the German Democratic Republic before reunification and the Bundestag thereafter.

From 20 July 2004 to January 2007 Kaufmann served as one of the 14 Vice-Presidents of the European Parliament.

On 14 May 2009 she left the Left Party after she failed to be reselected for the list of candidates for the European elections and joined the Social Democrats.

Kaufmann is member of the executive board of Europa-Union Deutschland, the German section of the Union of European Federalists.
