= Dagmar Roth-Behrendt =

German lawyer (born 1953)

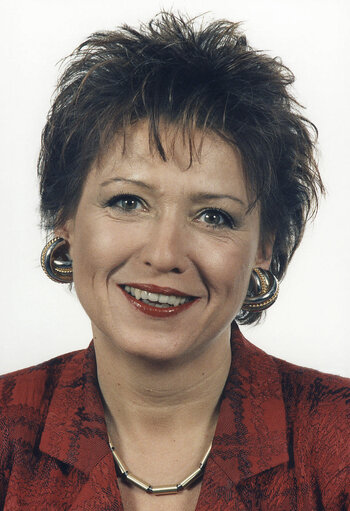
- Born: 21 February 1953 (age 73); Frankfurt am Main, West Germany
- Occupations: Politician, lawyer
- Office: Member of the European Parliament
- Political party: SPD

Dagmar Roth-Behrendt (born 21 February 1953) is a German lawyer who served as Member of the European Parliament. She was elected on the SPD ticket and sat with the Party of European Socialists group.

== Political career ==
Roth-Behrendt was a member of the European Parliament from 1989 to 2014. From 2004 until 2007 and from 2009 to 2012 she served as one of the 14 Vice-Presidents of the European Parliament, first under the leadership of President Josep Borrell and later Jerzy Buzek.

Throughout her time in parliament, Roth-Behrendt served on the Committee on the Environment, Public Health and Food Safety. In 1997, she chaired the temporary committee of inquiry into the European Commission's dealing with a BSE outbreak. She later served as rapporteur on the EU medical device regulation.

In addition to her committee assignments, Roth-Behrendt was part of the Parliament's delegation for relations with Australia and New Zealand from 1994 until 2004. In 2013, she was one of six candidates for the post of European Ombudsman. The role eventually went to Emily O’Reilly instead.

== Life after politics ==
Since 2015, Roth-Behrendt has been serving as Special Adviser to Development Cooperation to European Commissioner for Health and Food Safety Vytenis Andriukaitis on reforming the Directorate-General for Health and Food Safety (DG SANTE). From 2016 to 2022, she also served on the Commission's Independent Ethical Committee.

== Recognition ==
- 2009 – Order of Merit of the Federal Republic of Germany

== Personal life ==
Roth-Behrendt is married to former European Commission official Horst Reichenbach.
