= Luigi Cocilovo =

Italian politician (born 1947)

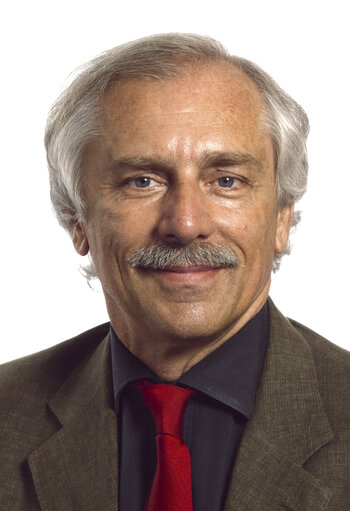
COCILOVO Luigi

Luigi Cocilovo (born 7 October 1947, in Palermo) is an Italian Member of the European Parliament and a university researcher in Law. He was elected on the Olive Tree ticket and sits with the Alliance of Liberals and Democrats for Europe group.

On 20 July 2004 he was elected one of the 14 Vice-Presidents of the European Parliament.
