= Miguel Ángel Martínez Martínez =

Spanish politician (born 1940)

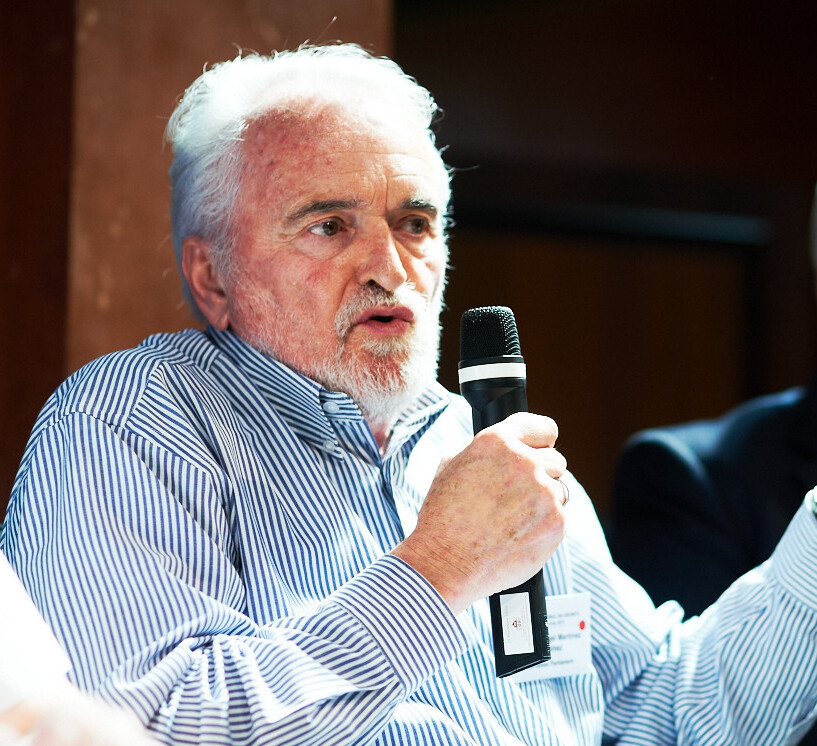
Martínez in 2011

Miguel Ángel Martínez Martínez (born 30 January 1940, in Madrid) is a Spanish politician and Member of the European Parliament for the Spanish Socialist Workers' Party, part of the Party of European Socialists. Martínez Martínez is a Vice Chair of the ACP-EU Joint Parliamentary Assembly.

He was the first full-time and paid Secretary General of the International Falcon Movement - Socialist Education International the children's international of the Socialist Group (1966–1972), Vice-President of the WEU Assembly (1986–1996). Vice-President (1983–1992) and President (1992–1996) of the Parliamentary Assembly of the Council of Europe. He also represented Ciudad Real Province in the Spanish Congress of Deputies from 1977 to 1999.

Political offices
Preceded by Geoffrey Finsberg	President of the Parliamentary Assembly of the Council of Europe; 1992–1995	Succeeded by Leni Fischer
