= Gérard Onesta =

French politician and was Member of the European Parliament (born 1960)

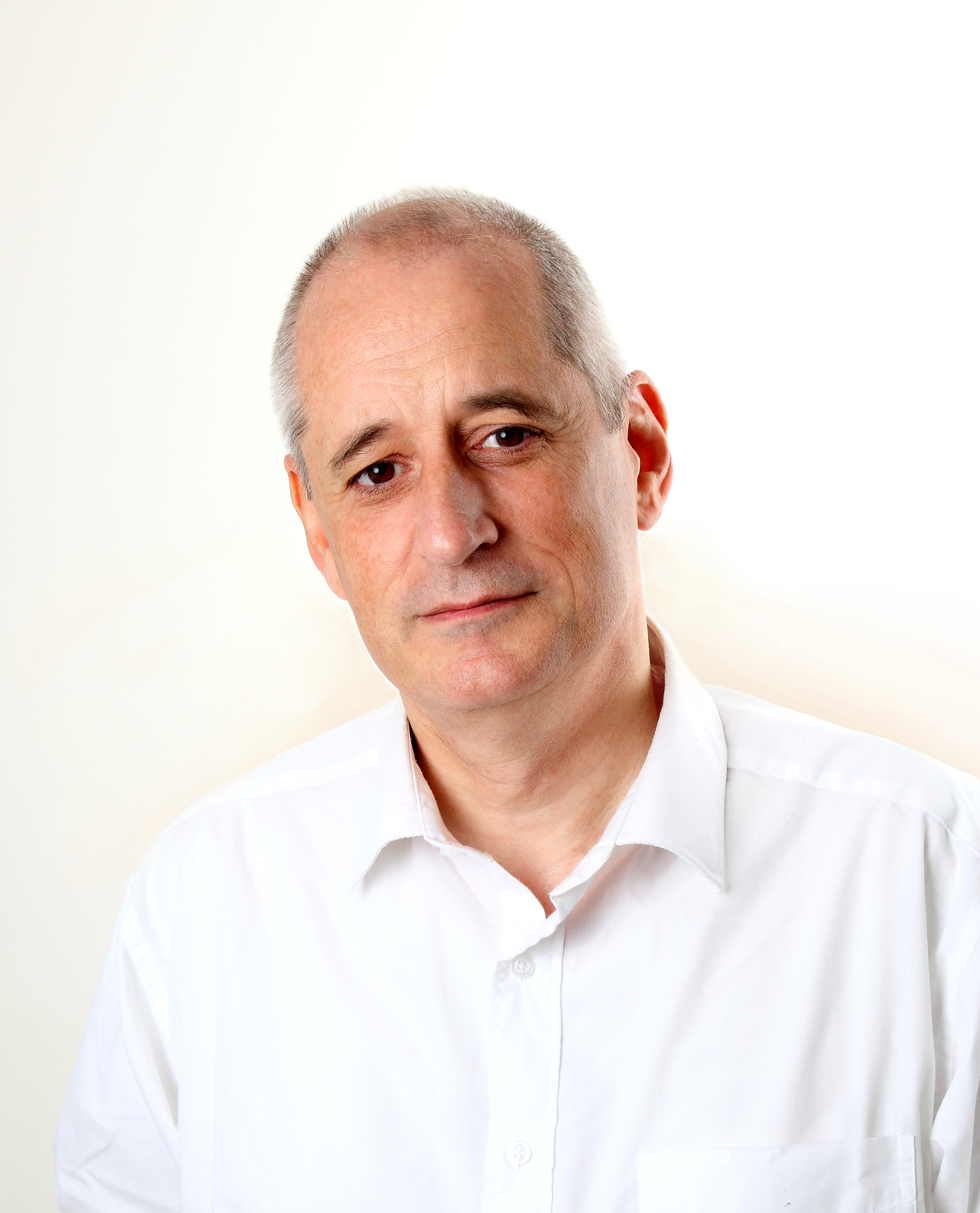
- Onesta in 2016

Member of the Regional council of Occitanie
- Incumbent
- Assumed office 4 January 2016
- President: Carole Delga

Member of the European Parliament
- In office 1999–2009

Personal details
- Born: 5 August 1960 (age 66) Albi, France
- Party: Europe Ecology - The Greens
- Relatives: Claude Onesta (cousin)

Gérard Onesta (born 5 August 1960) is a French politician and was Member of the European Parliament for the South West of France.

== Career and views ==
He is a member of Europe Écologie–The Greens, part of the European Greens. On 20 July 2004 he was re-elected a Member of the European Parliament, and he was elected four times one of its vice-presidents. His successor is José Bové.

In March 2010 regional election, he is the leader of Europe Écologie–The Greens in Midi-Pyrénées.

Onesta defines himself as a European federalist, with strong proclivities for regionalism.

== Trivia ==
His cousin Claude Onesta is the former coach of the 5 fold world champion France men's national handball team.
