= Roberta Metsola =

President of the European Parliament since 2022

Roberta Metsola MEP
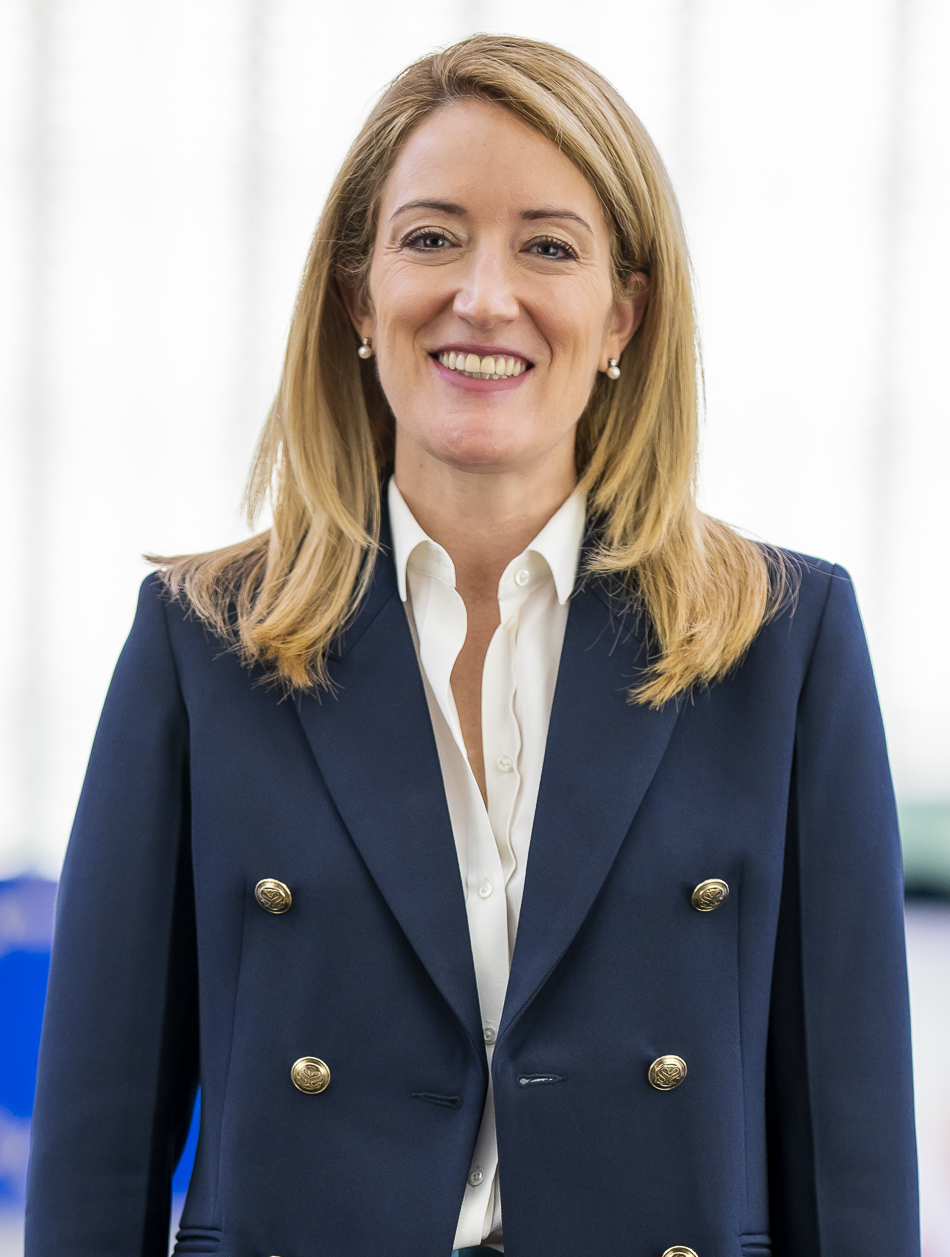
- Official portrait, 2022

President of the European Parliament
- Incumbent
- Assumed office 11 January 2022 (Note: Acting: 11–18 January 2022)
- Vice President: Othmar Karas (2022–2024); Sabine Verheyen (since 2024)
- Preceded by: David Sassoli

First Vice-President of the European Parliament
- In office 12 November 2020 – 18 January 2022
- President: David Sassoli
- Preceded by: Mairead McGuinness
- Succeeded by: Othmar Karas

Member of the European Parliament for Malta
- Incumbent
- Assumed office 24 April 2013
- Preceded by: Simon Busuttil

Personal details
- Born: Roberta Tedesco Triccas; 18 January 1979 (age 47) St. Julian's, Malta
- Party: Nationalist Party
- Other political affiliations: European People's Party
- Spouse: Ukko Metsola (m. 2005)
- Children: 4
- Education: University of Malta; College of Europe

Roberta Metsola (Note: Maltese: [rɔˈbɛrtɐ ˈmɛt͡sɔlɐ]) (née Tedesco Triccas; born 18 January 1979) is a Maltese politician who has served as the president of the European Parliament since January 2022. She is a member of Malta's Nationalist Party (PN) and the European People's Party (EPP).

Metsola was first elected as a member of the European Parliament (MEP) in 2013, and became the First Vice-President of the European Parliament in November 2020. Following the death of the incumbent president David Sassoli, Metsola was elected as president of the European Parliament on 18 January 2022, becoming the youngest ever president, the first Maltese person to hold the office, and the first female president since 2002.

== Biography ==
The Tedesco Triccas family stems from Swieqi, near St. Julian's, Malta, and she grew up with her father Geoffrey (son of Emmanuel Tedesco and Helen Triccas Dimech), her mother Rita (daughter of Carmelo Bezzina and Francesca Briffa), and her two sisters, Ann and Lisa, in Gżira. She was born in St. Julian's.

Tedesco Triccas has been active since youth within Malta's Nationalist Party (PN), serving within the party's international secretariat and volunteering with the PN's election arm ELCOM. In her student years, she formed part of the SDM (Studenti Demokristjani Maltin), KNZ (The National Youth Council), the Young European Federalists Malta (JEF Malta), and MŻPN (Moviment Żgħażagħ Partit Nazzjonalista), before being elected as Secretary General of the European Democrat Students (EDS), the student branch of the EPP, as well as to posts within the European Youth Forum (YFJ).

In 2002, at the age of 23, Tedesco Triccas was elected as one of the two vice-presidents of the executive board of the Youth Convention on the Future of Europe. The following year, she actively campaigned with the PN for a Yes vote in the 2003 Maltese European Union membership referendum. Following her engagement in the European Union referendum campaign, the 25-year-old Tedesco Triccas was encouraged, by Malta's then prime minister Lawrence Gonzi, to run for the 2004 European Parliament election in Malta as a candidate for the PN. She was not elected. In October 2004, she joined the Permanent Representation of Malta to the EU in Brussels, headed by Richard Cachia Caruana, where she worked for eight years as a legal and judicial cooperation attaché, also participating for Malta in the negotiations of the Lisbon Treaty and working on files like the set-up of the European Asylum Support Office in Malta.

Metsola ran again for the 2009 European Parliament election in Malta for the PN, without being elected. In 2013–2014, she briefly served as legal advisor to the High Representative of the Union for Foreign Affairs and Security Policy, Catherine Ashton.

== Education ==
She studied at St Joseph School in Sliema, St Aloysius' College sixth form, graduated in law from the University of Malta in 2003, and obtained a diploma in European studies from the College of Europe in Bruges in 2004.

She has also been awarded the degree of Doctor Honoris Causa (an honorary doctorate) by the University of Lisbon.

== Member of the European Parliament ==
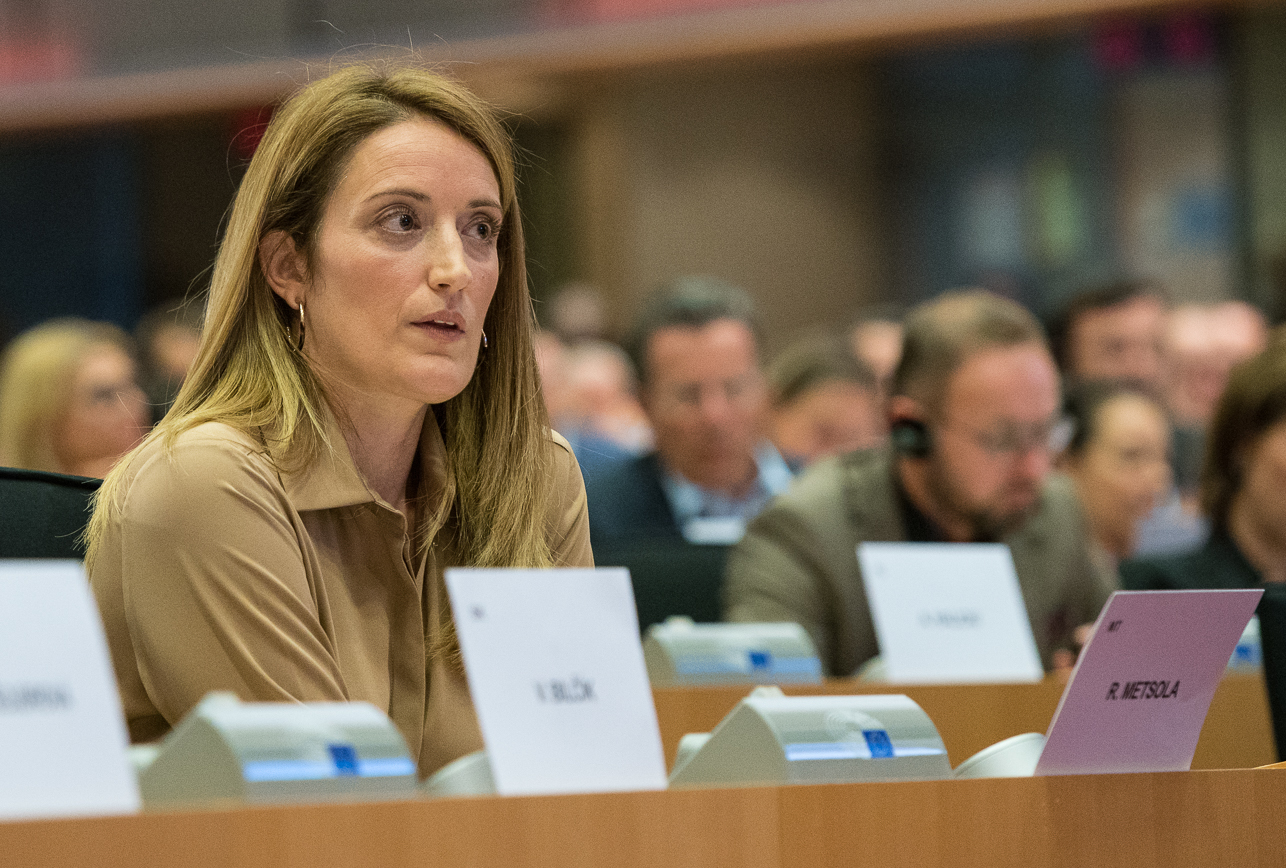
Metsola asking a question in 2019 hearings for the von der Leyen Commission

On 24 April 2013, Metsola successfully contested the casual election to fill the vacated seat of Simon Busuttil, becoming one of Malta's first female members of the European Parliament (MEPs). In the European Parliament, she sits as a member of the European People's Party Group (EPP).

Following her re-election at the 2014 European Parliament election in Malta, Metsola was elected as a vice-chair of the Committee on Petitions (PETI) in July 2014. In addition, she served as a member of a number of committees and delegations. She also joined the parliamentary intergroup on children's rights. Metsola was further re-elected at the 2019 European Parliament election in Malta; in this legislature, she closely followed the party line, voting together with the EPP delegation in over 90% of the cases.

In 2014, Metsola led the EPP representation in the Committee on Civil Liberties, Justice and Home Affairs (LIBE) in the work on the non-binding EU roadmap against homophobia and discrimination on the grounds of sexual orientation and gender identity, whose rapporteur was European Green Party MEP Ulrike Lunacek. She was the parliament's rapporteur on the European Border and Coastguard Regulation in 2019 and was co-rapporteur on an anti-SLAPP report in 2021.

She was the parliament's rapporteur on the European Border and Coastguard Regulation in 2019, which legislated for 10,000 new borderguards for the European frontiers.

Metsola also co-authored a non-binding report on the European migrant crisis in 2016, aimed at establishing a "binding and mandatory legislative approach" on resettlement and new EU-wide readmission agreements, which should take precedence over bilateral ones between EU and non-EU countries.

From 2016 until 2017, Metsola was part of the Parliament's Committee of Inquiry into Money Laundering, Tax Avoidance and Tax Evasion (PANA) that investigated the Panama Papers revelations and tax avoidance schemes more broadly. Within LIBE, where she chaired the EPP representation between January 2017 and 2020, she has been part of the Rule of Law Monitoring Group (ROLMG) since 2018.

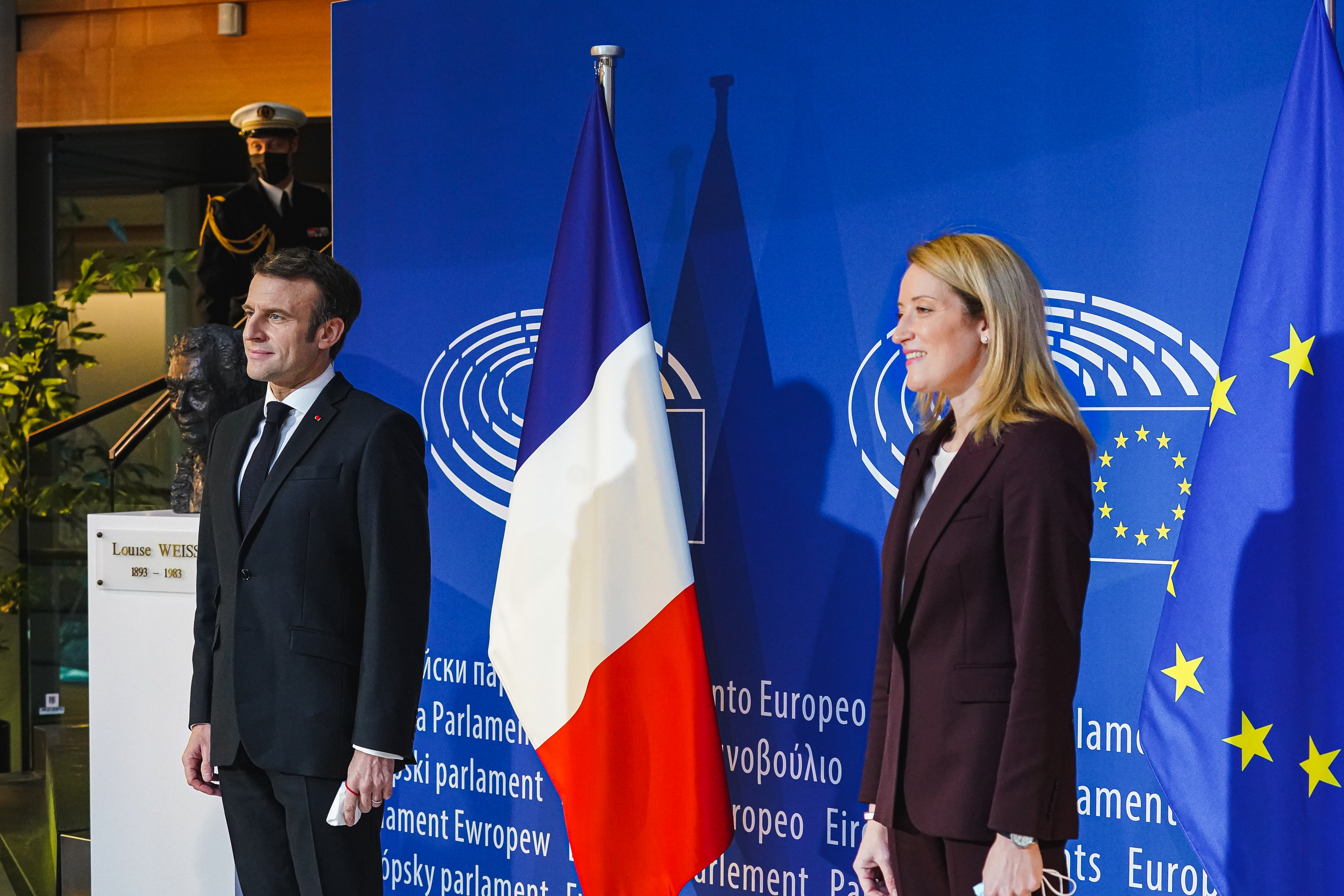
Metsola with French President Emmanuel Macron at the European Parliament on 19 January 2022

In 2019, during the controversies following the murder of Daphne Caruana Galizia, Metsola famously refused to shake hands with Malta's then-prime minister Joseph Muscat at a meeting with the MEPs from Malta. She wrote: "If he thinks he can try to brush off responsibility he is sorely mistaken. Get out now, before you do irreparable damage to the country." In 2020, Metsola considered contesting the leadership of the PN but decided against it. She stated: "Some ceilings need a few more cracks before they can be smashed through." The post was later filled by Bernard Grech.

In October 2020, in the discussion in LIBE on a parliamentary resolution on "the rule of law and fundamental rights in Bulgaria", Metsola tabled amendments, on behalf of the EPP, which were widely interpreted as shielding Bulgaria's EPP government from criticism, including by proposing to remove references to Venice Commission findings and to the misuse of EU funds and high-level corruption allegations directly involving the then prime minister Boyko Borisov. Other amendments, which she later withdrew, also alleged that a gambling boss had been financing the 2020–2021 Bulgarian protests. This caused outrage in Bulgaria, leading to Metsola's social media accounts being flooded by protest messages, including threats and misogyny. The EPP amendments were finally defeated, and the resolution was adopted as it had been originally proposed.

In November 2020, Metsola was elected as the First Vice-President of the European Parliament, replacing Mairead McGuinness, who had become European Commissioner. She was the first Maltese MEP to become a vice-president.

In June 2024, Roberta Metsola was elected for the third time as Member of the European Parliament, with a record number of 87,473 first preference votes.

=== President of the European Parliament ===
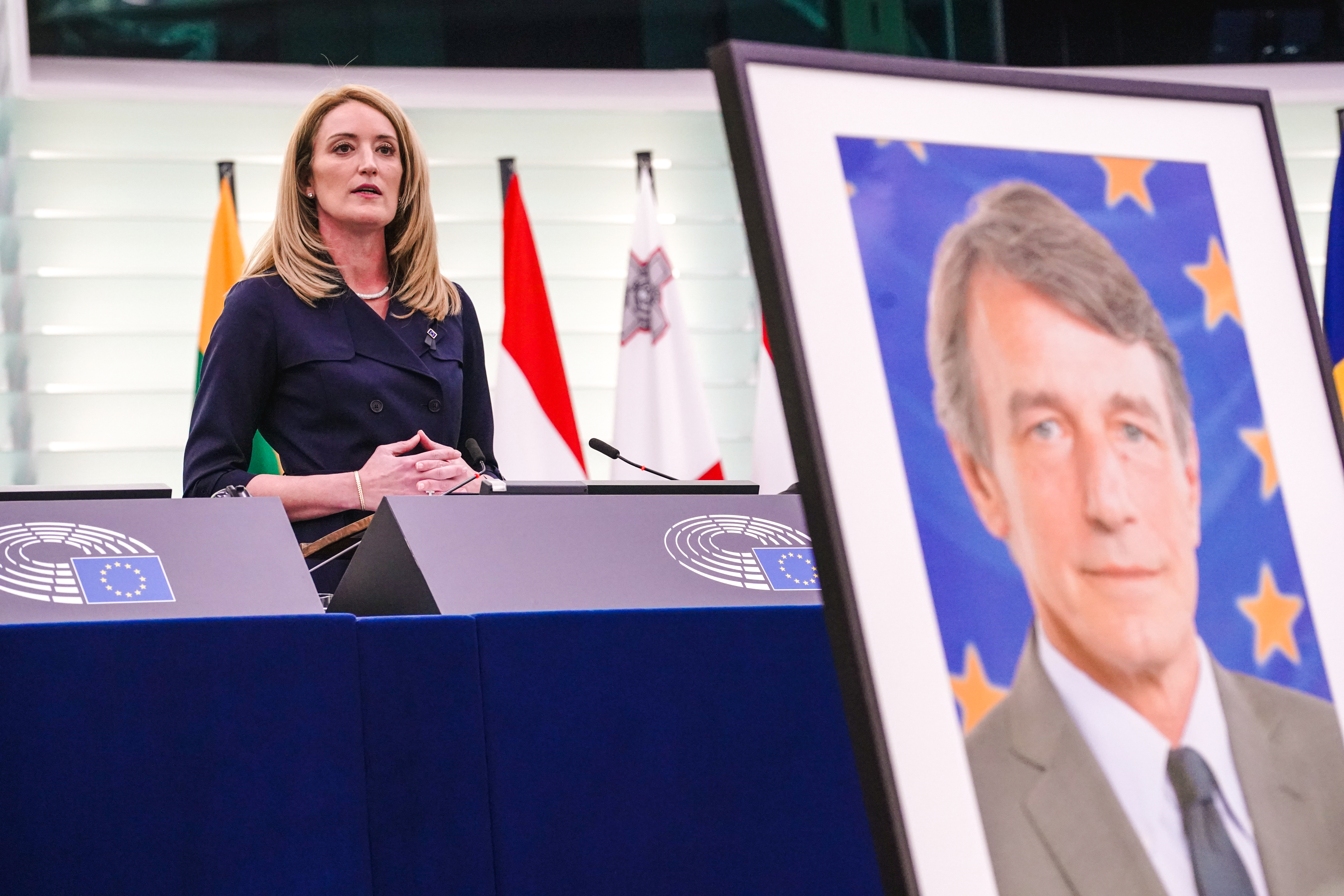
Metsola speaking in a memorial ceremony for David Sassoli in the European Parliament in January 2022

In November 2021, Metsola was chosen as the EPP candidate to succeed David Sassoli as president of the European Parliament on the expiry of his term as president in January 2022. Sassoli had been hospitalised with pneumonia in September 2021, and in December announced that he would not seek a second term as president, making Metsola his likely successor. Following further hospitalisation, Sassoli died on 11 January 2022, one week before the end of his term. On Sassoli's death, Metsola became the acting president of the European Parliament.

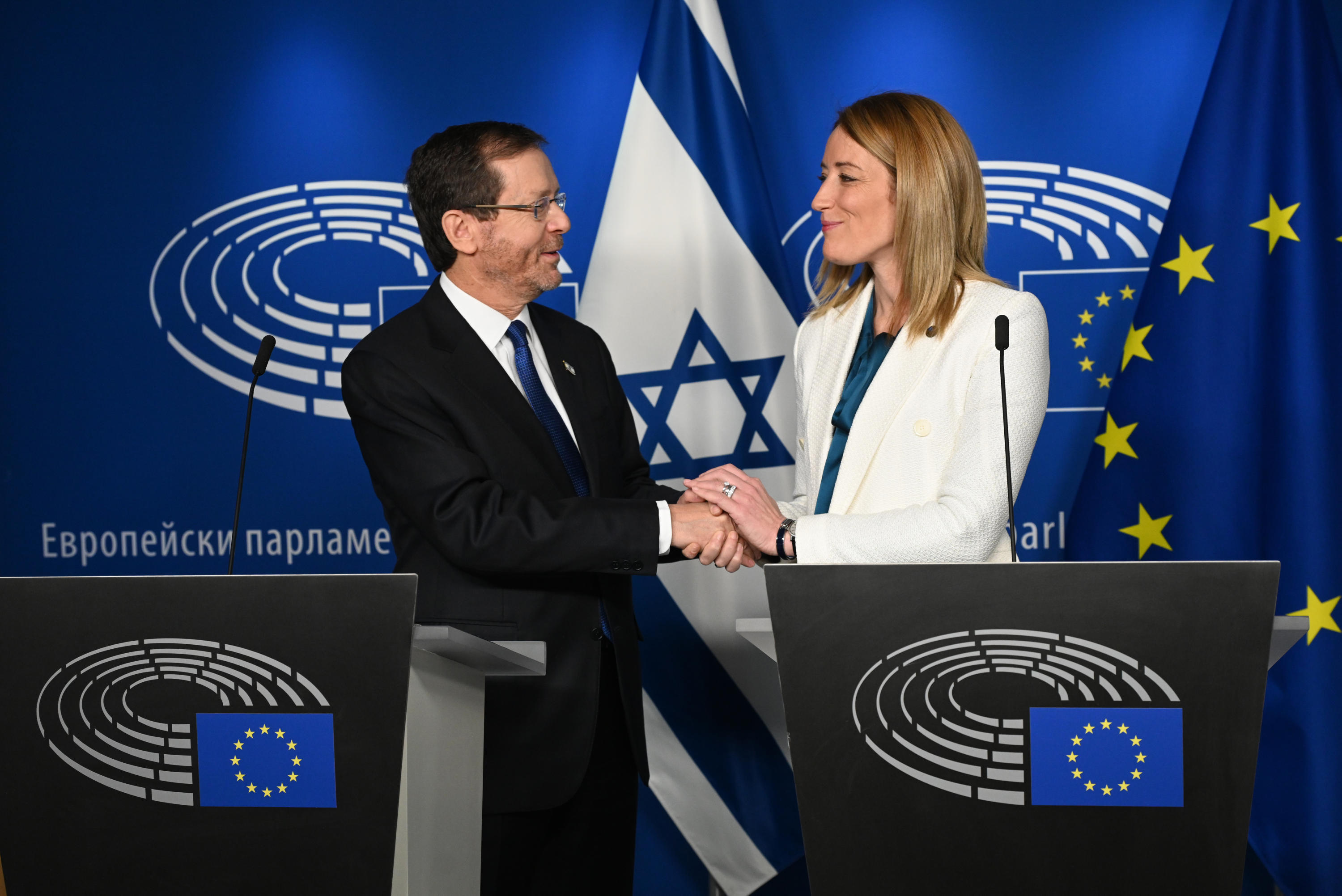
Metsola with Israeli President Isaac Herzog at the European Parliament on 26 January 2023

On 18 January 2022, on her 43rd birthday, Metsola was elected president of the European Parliament for a two-and-a-half-year term. She was elected in the first round of voting, receiving an absolute majority of 458 votes out of the 690 cast. As the candidate of the EPP, she was also supported by the S&D and Renew Europe parliamentary groups, after the three groups reached an agreement on the election of the president and the vice-presidents and legislative priorities for the second half of the European Parliament's term. On her election, Metsola became the youngest ever president, the first Maltese person to hold the office, and the first woman president since 2002 and only third woman president ever. As President, she oversaw the Belgian police search the residence of Greek MEP Eva Kaili in the widening Qatar corruption scandal at the European Parliament over alleged corruption, money laundering, and other offences in relation to possible schemes of Qatar, Morocco, NGOs, and the FIFA World Cup.

As President of the European Parliament, Roberta Metsola was the first leader of an EU institution to visit Ukraine in April 2022, following the Russian invasion of Ukraine, and Israel, with President von der Leyen, following the October 7 attacks in 2023.

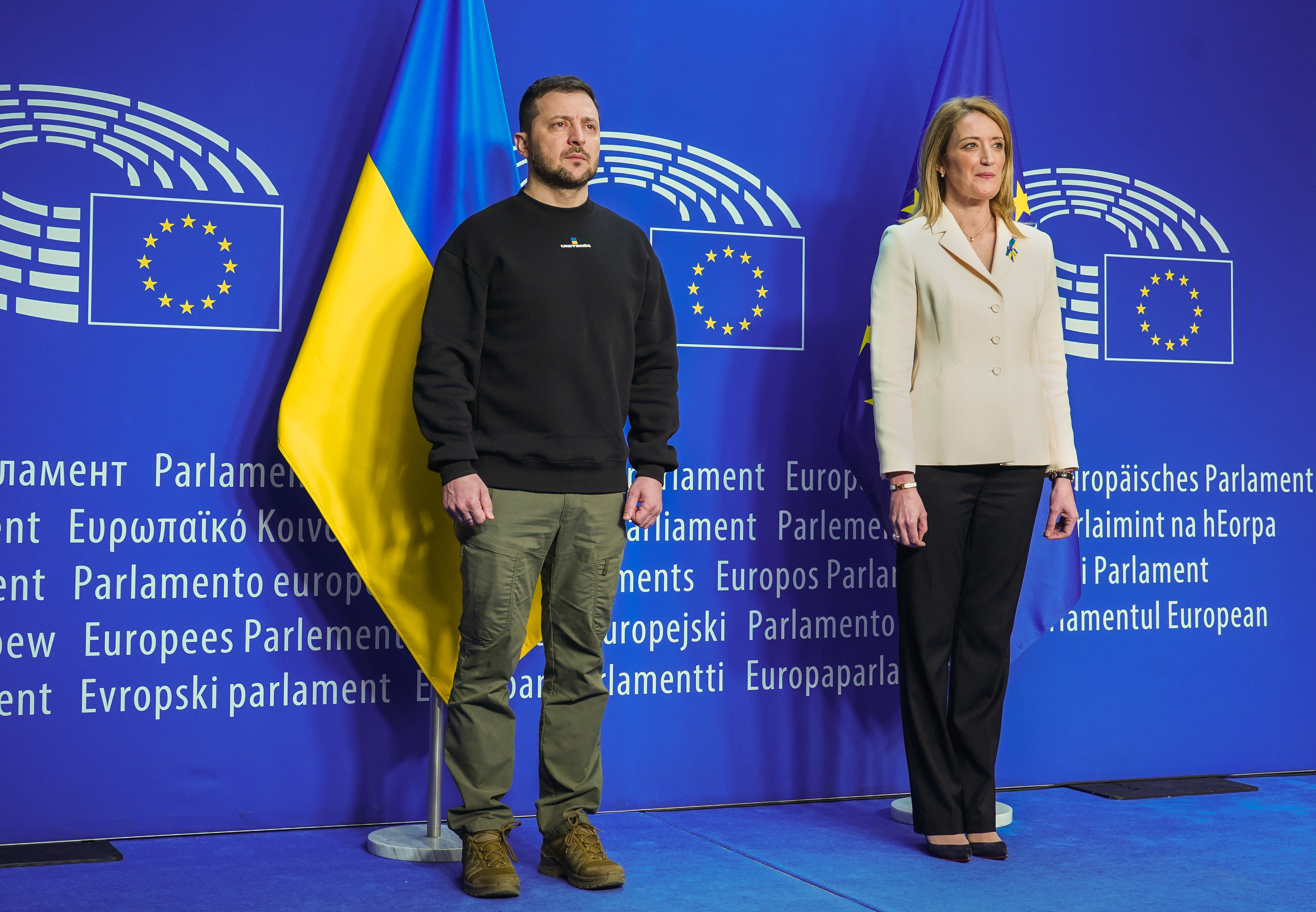
Metsola meets President of Ukraine Volodymyr Zelenskyy at the European Parliament on 9 February 2023.

On 21 May 2023, Metsola participated in the European Moldova National Assembly together with President of Moldova Maia Sandu. This was a massive pro-European rally in the Moldovan capital Chișinău with tens of thousands of participants. Metsola gave rally participants a message during her speech: Europa este Moldova! Moldova este Europa! ("Europe is Moldova! Moldova is Europe!"). Metsola has called for strengthening the powers of the European Parliament. On 16 July 2024 Roberta Metsola was re-elected President of the European Parliament with a record of 90% (562 of 623 MEPs who voted).

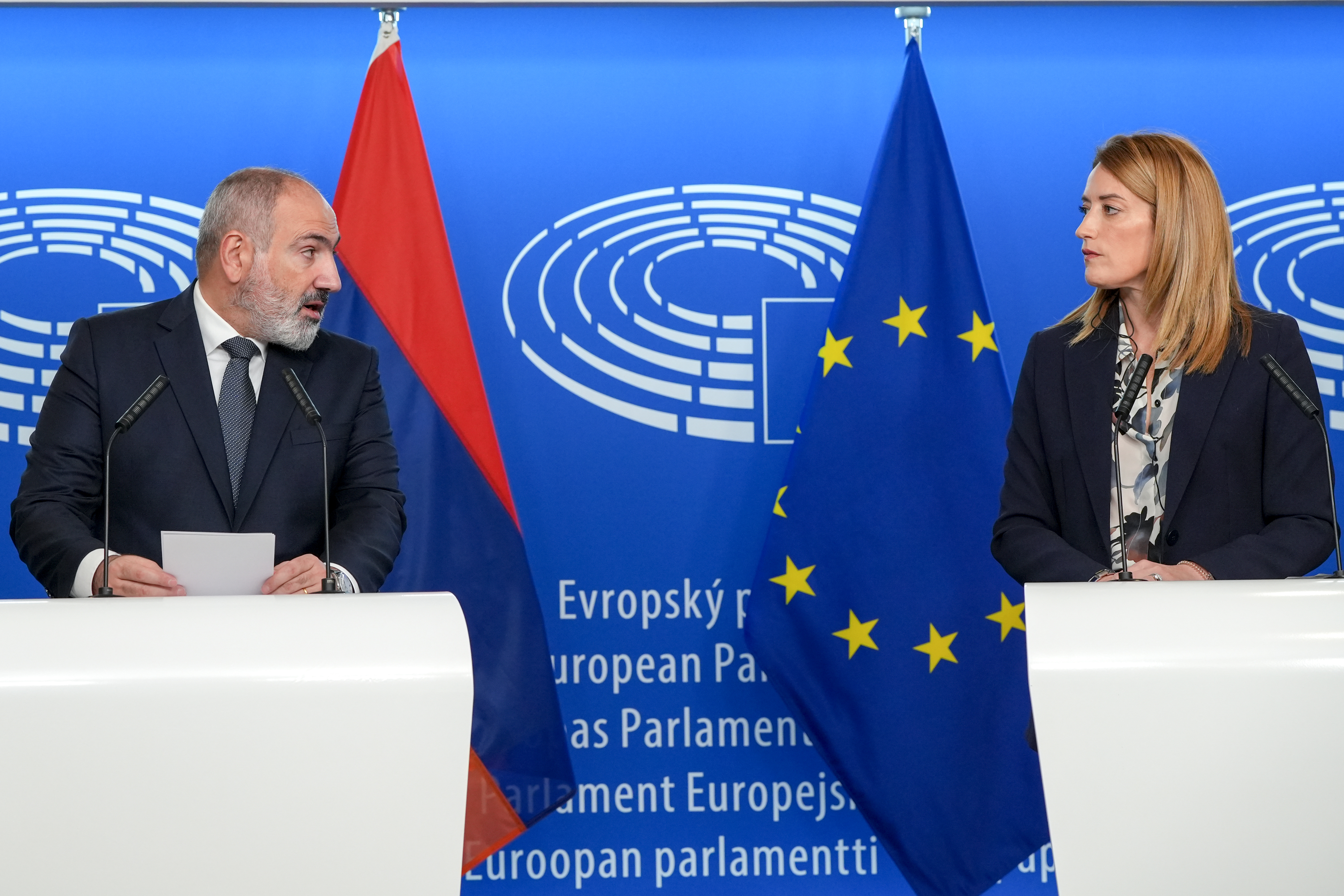
Metsola with Armenian Prime Minister Nikol Pashinyan at the European Parliament on 20 October 2023

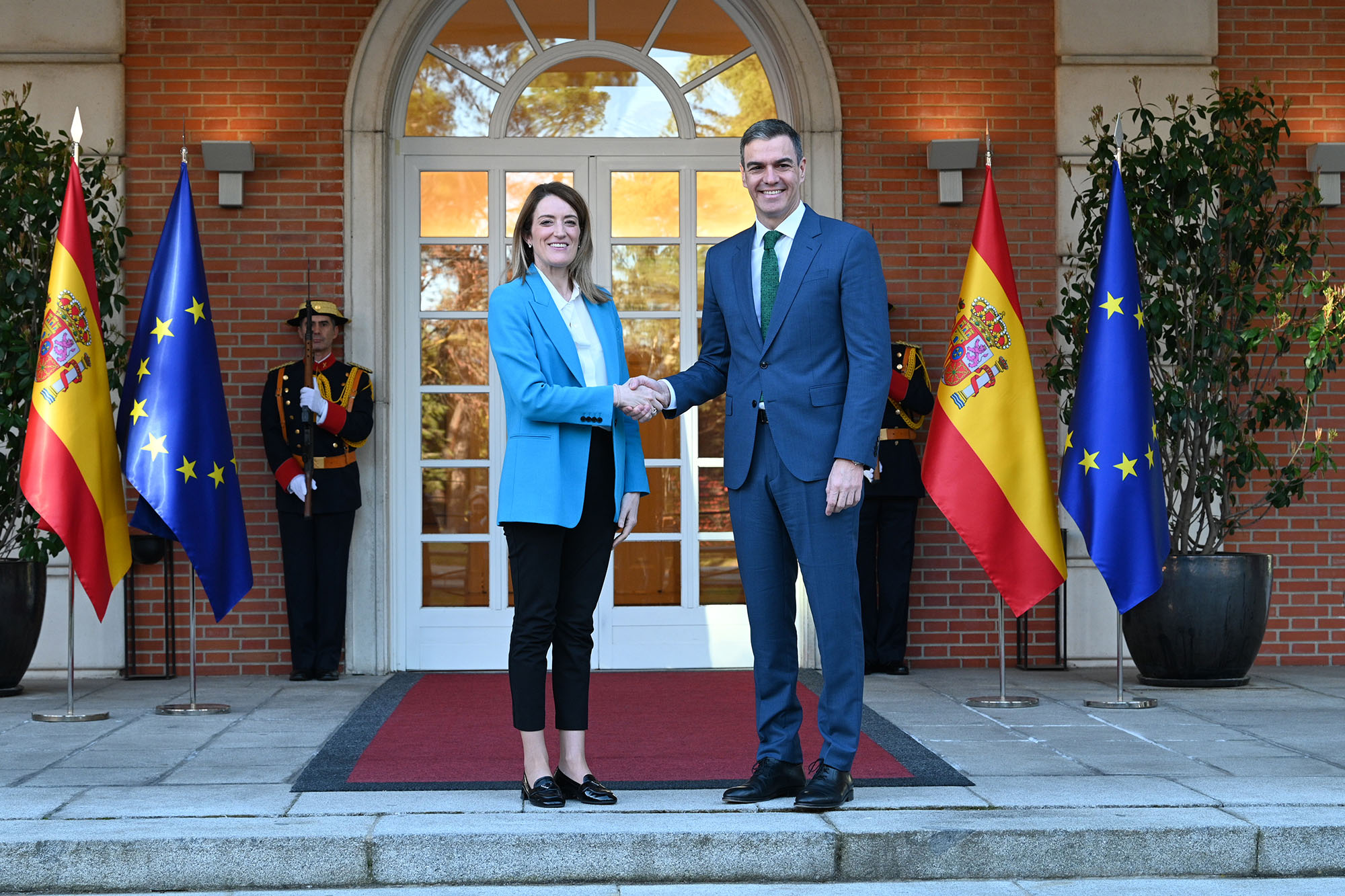
Metsola with Spanish Prime Minister Pedro Sánchez in Madrid, 1 March 2024

Metsola with President Karol Nawrocki in Warsaw, 2026

==== Anti-abortion views ====
Metsola had consistently voted for anti-abortion resolutions. From the beginning of her tenure, she faced questions over her opposition to abortion, which is legal in every EU member state, except Malta and Poland. In a 2015 press release, she and fellow Maltese MEPs declared that they were "categorically against abortion". On her election as president of the European Parliament, she stated that during her tenure she would represent the European Parliament's position, which recognises safe access to abortion as a human right.

== Other activities ==
- Wilfried Martens Centre for European Studies, member of the Executive Board
- Friends of Europe, member of the Board of Trustees (since 2020)

== Personal life ==
Metsola met her Finnish husband, Ukko Metsola, at a youth event in 1999. They married in 2005. They both ran for the 2009 European Parliament election, making them the first married couple to run in the same European Parliament election from two different member states. They have four sons.

In September 2024, Politico Europe reported that, under a new ethics code for the European Parliament Metsola had advocated for, she would not have to declare her husband's role as the top European Union lobbyist for Royal Caribbean Group as a conflict of interest, unlike other MEPs. This was because the president of the European Parliament was exempt from doing so under the ethics code.

== Honours and awards ==
- Ukraine:
  - Recipient of the First Class of the Order of Princess Olga
  - The first recipient of the Anna of Kyiv Gold Medal
- United Transitional Cabinet of Belarus:
  - Cross of Good Neighbourhood
- In Veritate Award given to EP President Metsola for her achievements in combining Christian and European values, in 2023
- President Metsola awarded the 2024 Forum Europa Prize in Madrid
- Doctor Honoris Causa (an honorary doctorate) by the University of Lisbon

== Notes ==
Political offices
Preceded by David Sassoli	President of the European Parliament; 2022–present	Incumbent
Academic offices
Preceded by Alexander De Croo	Invocation Speaker of the College of Europe; 2022	Succeeded by Petr Pavel
