= Frontex =

Agency of the European Union tasked with external border control

European Border and Coast Guard Agency
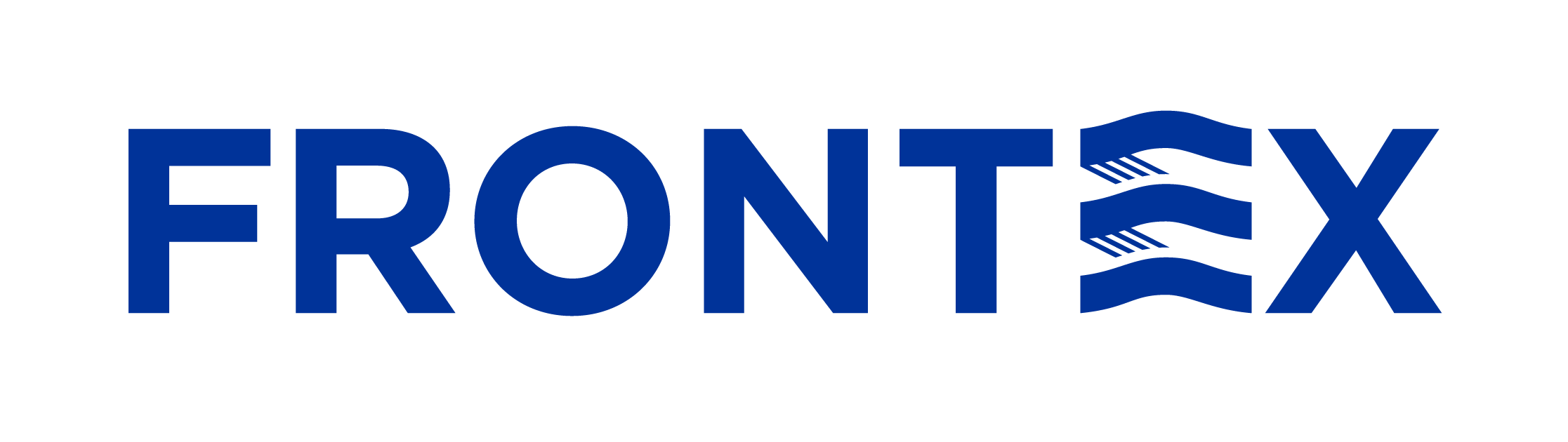
- The logo of Frontex

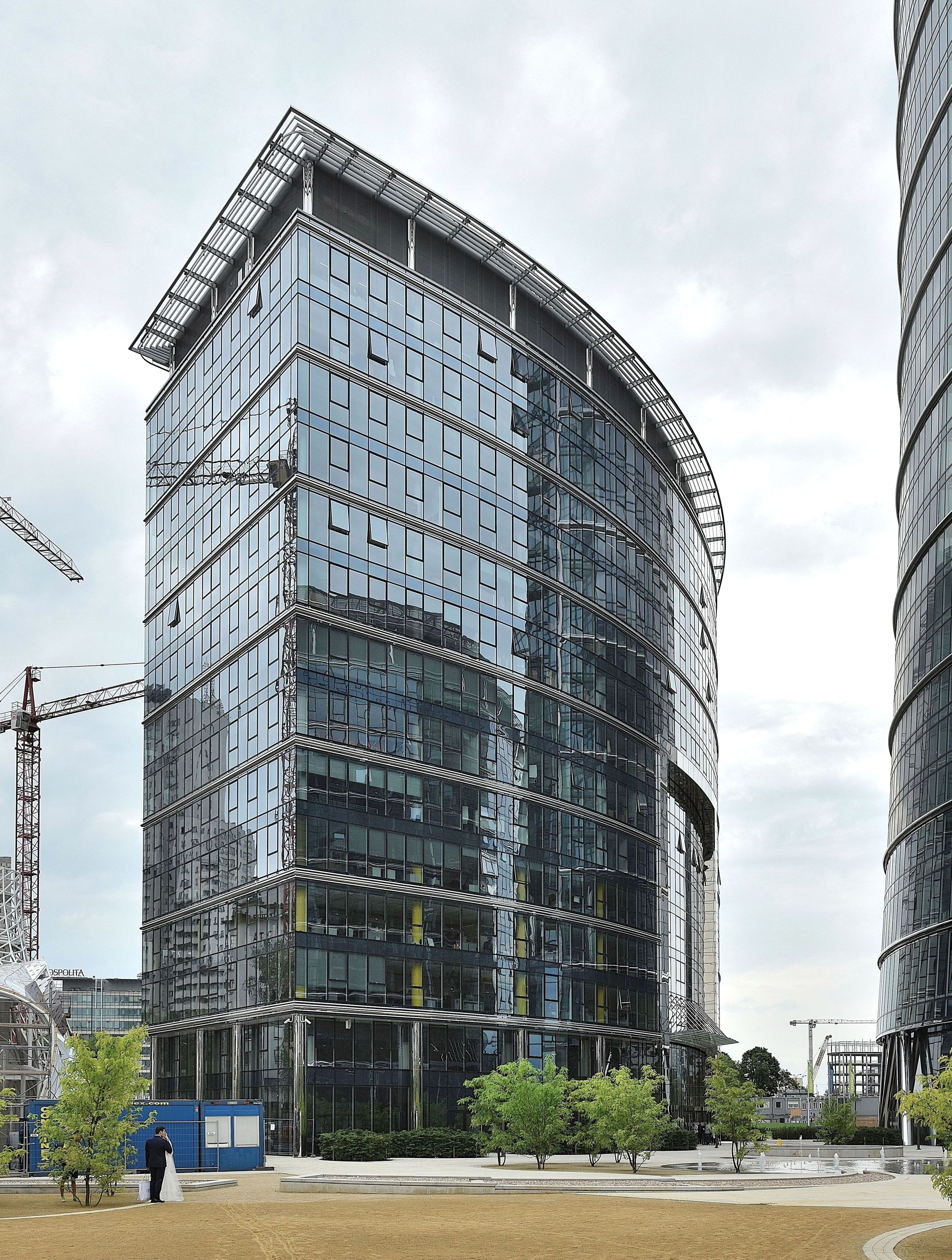
- The section of Warsaw Spire which houses Frontex's seat

Agency overview
- Formed: 3 October 2004 (original); 6 October 2016 (as European Border and Coast Guard Agency)
- Preceding Agency: European Agency for the Management of Operational Cooperation at the External Borders
- Jurisdiction: European Union
- Headquarters: Warsaw, Poland
- Employees: 3500+ (2026); 10,000 (2027, proposed)
- Annual budget: € 1.12 billion (2025)
- Agency executives: Hans Leijtens, Executive Director; Aija Kalnaja, Deputy Executive Director for Standing Corps Management; Lars Gerdes, Deputy Executive Director for Returns and Operations; Uku Särekanno, Deputy Executive Director for Information Management and Processes; Alexander Fritsch, Chairman of the Management Board; Neville Xuereb, Deputy Chairman of the Management Board
- Parent Agency: European Union
- Key document: Regulation (EU) 2019/1896
- Website: frontex.europa.eu

Map
- Frontex (European Union)

The European Border and Coast Guard Agency, commonly known as Frontex, from frontières extérieures (French for 'external borders'), is an agency of the European Union headquartered in Warsaw, Poland.

In coordination with the border and coast guards of member states, it exercises border control of the European Schengen Area, a task within the area of freedom, security and justice domain. Formally, the Agency's remit is to "support Member States on the ground in their efforts to protect the external borders"; it does not have authority to act otherwise unless "external border control" [by a member state] "is rendered ineffective to such an extent that it risks jeopardising the functioning of the Schengen area".

Frontex was established in 2004 as the European Agency for the Management of Operational Cooperation at the External Borders and is primarily responsible for coordinating border control efforts. In response to the European migrant crisis of 2015–2016, the European Commission proposed on 15 December 2015 to extend Frontex's mandate and to transform it into a fully-fledged European Border and Coast Guard Agency. On 18 December 2015, the European Council roundly supported the proposal, and after a vote by the European Parliament, the European Border and Coast Guard was officially launched on 6 October 2016 at the Bulgarian external border with Turkey. In November 2019, the remit and resources of the agency were extended.

Frontex's budget has increased from the €143 million for 2015 to €1.12 billion for 2025, and the staff of the agency is planned to reach 10,000 by 2027.

== Organisation ==
=== National authorities ===
The European Border and Coast Guard's national component comprises relevant authorities in each Schengen Area member state, which exercise the day-to-day management of their sections of the external borders of the Schengen Area. They are:

Authorities of countries outside the European Union

==== Coasts ====
National authorities securing the coasts of the Schengen Area
Member State	Coast guard	Racing stripe
Belgium	Federal Police; Coast Guard	
Bulgaria	Border Police	
Croatia	Coast Guard	
Cyprus	Port and Marine Police	
Denmark	Admiral Fleet	
Estonia	Police and Border Guard Board	
Finland	Border Guard	
France	Maritime Gendarmerie, Directorate-General of Customs and Indirect Taxes, French Navy, Directorate general for Maritime affairs, Fisheries and Aquaculture and Central Directorate of the Border Police	
Germany	Federal Police; Federal Coast Guard	
Greece	Coast Guard	
Iceland	Coast Guard	
Italy	Corps of the Port Captaincies – Coast Guard and Guardia di Finanza	
Latvia	State Border Guard	
Latvia	Latvian Naval Forces	
Lithuania	State Border Guard Service	
Malta	Maritime Squadron of the Armed Forces	
Netherlands	Coastguard	
Norway	Coast Guard	
Poland	Border Guard	
Portugal	Maritime Authority System	
Romania	Border Police	
Slovenia	Police	
Spain	Civil Guard	
Spain	Maritime Safety and Rescue Society	
Spain	Customs Surveillance Service	
Sweden	Coast Guard	

==== Land borders ====
National authorities securing the external land borders of the Schengen Area
Member State	Bulgaria	Croatia	Estonia	Finland	France	Greece	Hungary	Latvia	Lithuania	Norway	Poland	Romania	Slovakia
Border in question	Bulgaria–North Macedonia, Bulgaria–Serbia, Bulgaria–Turkey	Croatia–Serbia, Croatia–Bosnia and Herzegovina, Croatia–Montenegro	Estonia–Russia	Finland–Russia	France–Andorra	Greece–Albania, Greece–North Macedonia, Greece–Turkey	Hungary–Ukraine, Hungary–Serbia	Latvia–Russia, Latvia–Belarus	Lithuania–Russia, Lithuania–Belarus	Norway–Russia	Poland–Russia, Poland–Ukraine, Poland–Belarus	Romania–Moldova, Romania–Ukraine, Romania-Serbia	Slovakia–Ukraine
Border guard	Border Police	Police	Police and Border Guard Board	Border Guard	Central Directorate of the Border Police and Directorate-General of Customs and Indirect Taxes	Police	Police	State Border Guard	State Border Guard Service	Police; Garrison of Sør-Varanger	Policja; Border Guard	Romanian Border Police	Bureau of Border and Alien Police
Boundary marker	Undemarcated borders	Undemarcated borders			Undemarcated borders								

=== Union agency ===
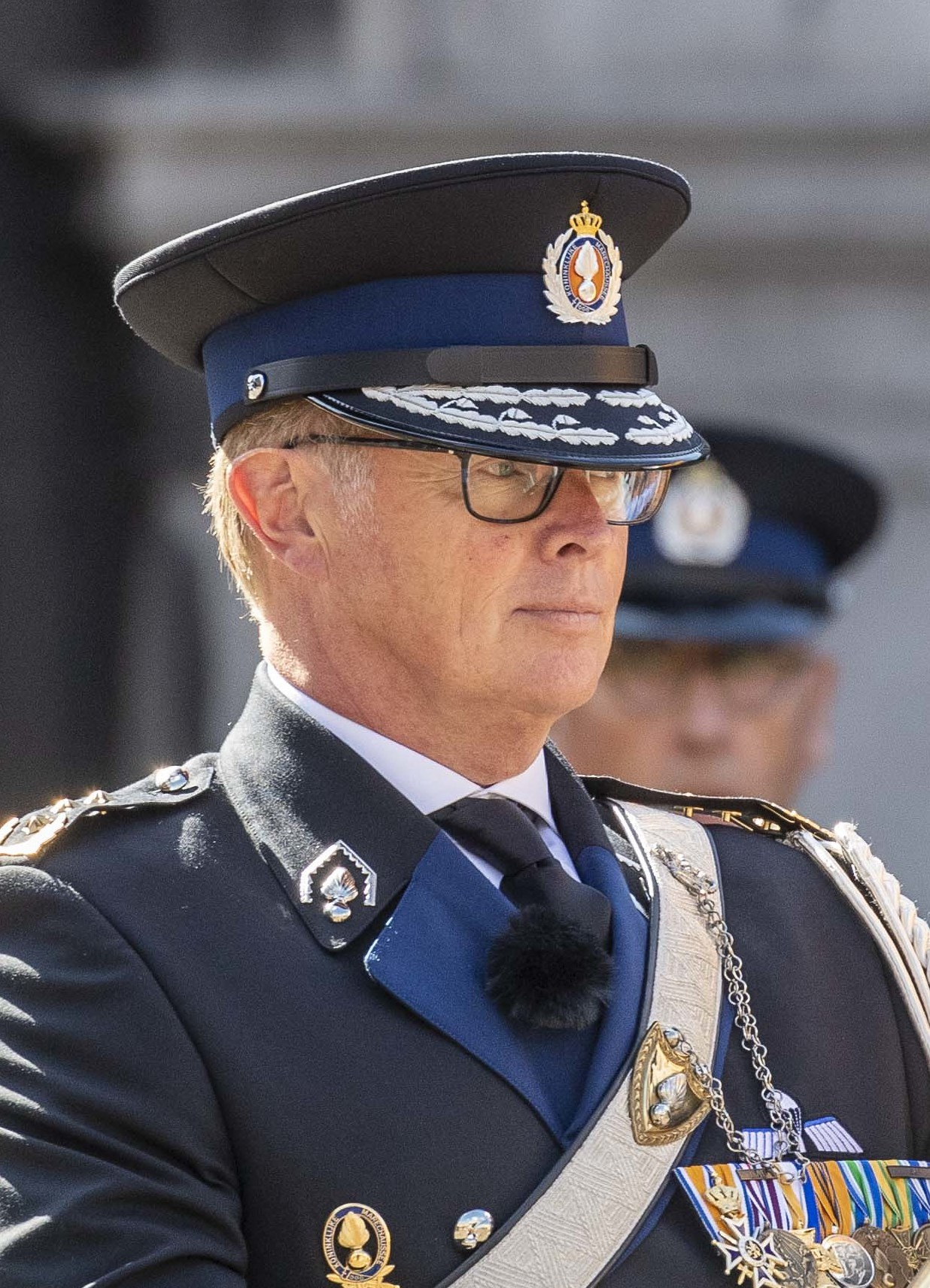
Hans Leijtens, executive director of Frontex, during his service as lieutenant-general of the Royal Marechaussee.

The European Union's agency, titled European Border and Coast Guard Agency, provides a reserve of European border guards and technical equipment. The agency may purchases its own flagged vehicles. The Member States where this equipment is registered (bigger equipment such as patrol vessels, aircraft, etc.) are obliged to put it at the Agency's disposal whenever needed. This enables the Agency to rapidly deploy the necessary technical equipment in border operations. A rapid reserve pool of border guards and a technical equipment pool is at the disposal of the agency, intending to remove the shortages of staff and equipment for the Agency's operations.

According to a 2021 Guardian investigation, EU member states with Frontex complicity in some cases have been responsible for pushback of almost 40,000 asylum seekers, resulting in 2,000 deaths, in violation of EU and international law. Frontex denies taking part in pushbacks; the claims are currently under investigation by EU anti-fraud agency OLAF.

According to the European Commission the European Border and Coast Guard "will bring together a European Border and Coast Guard Agency built from Frontex and the Member States’ authorities responsible for border management" with day-to-day management of external border regions remaining the responsibility of member states. It is intended that the new European Border and Coast Guard Agency will act in a supporting role for members in need of assistance, as well as to coordinate overall border management of Europe's external borders. Securing and patrolling of the external borders of the European Union (EU, in practice the Schengen Area including the Schengen Associated Countries as well as those EU Member States which have not yet joined the Schengen Area but are bound to do so) is a shared responsibility of the Agency and the national authorities.

==== Standing Corps ====
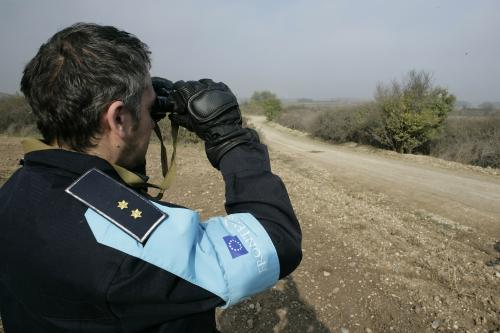
A Frontex-officer scans the EU external border.

Launched in 2021, the European Border and Coast Guard standing corps is the EU's first uniformed service. By 2027, the corps is planned to number 10 000 personnel.

The corps is composed of agency and member states' officers, who support and work under the command of the national authorities of the country in they are deployed in.

The future officers who are recruited do not necessarily need prior law enforcement experience, and undergo a year of training organised by the agency.

Tasks performed by the standing corps:

- border checks and patrols
- identity and document checks
- registration of migrants

The corps may also work in non-EU countries that have signed a 'status agreement' with the European Commission, such as Albania, Montenegro or Serbia.

==== Ranks and insignia ====
===== Commissioned officers =====
Rank group	Senior commissioned officers			Junior commissioned officers		
NATO code	OF-5	OF-4	OF-3	OF-2	OF-1	
Insignia						
Rank	Colonel	Lieutenant Colonel	Major	Captain	Lieutenant	2^{nd} Lieutenant

===== Enlisted personnel and NCOs =====
Rank group	Non-commissioned officers					Enlisted			
NATO code	OR-9	OR-8	OR-7	OR-6	OR-5	OR-4	OR-3	OR-2	OR-1
Insignia									
Rank	Chief Warrant Officer	Warrant Officer	Staff Sergeant	Sergeant		Corporal	Guard 1^{st} Class	Guard 2^{nd} Class	Guard

===== Students =====
Rank group	SCOs	JCOs	NCOs	Enlisted
Insignia				
Rank	SCO Learner	JCO Learner	NCO Learner	Learner

==== Tasks ====
===== Monitoring and risk analysis =====
A monitoring and risk analysis centre will be established, with the authorisation to carry out risk analysis and to monitor the flows towards and within the EU. The risk analysis includes cross-border crime and terrorism, process personal data of persons suspected to be involved in acts of terrorism and cooperate with other Union agencies and international organisations on the prevention of terrorism. A mandatory vulnerability assessments of the capacities of the Member States to face current or upcoming challenges at their external borders will be established.

The Agency is able to launch joint operations, including the use of drones when necessary. The European Space Agency's Earth observation system Copernicus provides the new Agency with almost real time satellite surveillance capabilities alongside the current Eurosur border surveillance system.

Frontex regularly releases reports analyzing events related to border control, irregular border crossing and different forms of cross-border crime. The general task of assessing these risks has been laid out in Frontex founding regulation, according to which the agency shall "carry out risk analyses [...] in order to provide the Community and the Member States with adequate information to allow for appropriate measures to be taken or to tackle identified threats and risks with a view to improving the integrated management of external borders". Frontex's key institution with respect to intelligence and risk assessment is its Risk Analysis Unit (RAU) and the Frontex Risk Analysis Network (FRAN), via which the Frontex staff is cooperating with security experts from the Member States.

The latest FRAN report as of 2013 stated that 24 805 illegal border-crossing were detected. In the Eastern Mediterranean area specifically at the land border between Greece and Turkey, illegal border-crossings were down by nearly 70% compared to the second quarter of 2012, but up in the Central Mediterranean route.

===== Working with and in third countries =====
On 23 February 2012, Frontex signed a working arrangement with Armenia. Representatives of Frontex met with Artur Baghdasaryan, former head of the Security Council of Armenia. Areas of mutual cooperation and promoting peace and security in the South Caucasus region was discussed.

The Agency approved a mandate to send liaison officers and launch joint operations with neighbouring third countries, including operating on their territory. The Agency has developed a network of Frontex Liaison Officers in non-EU countries, including in countries of the Eastern Partnership, the Western Balkans, and West Africa.

The Agency cooperates with numerous countries beyond the EU. As of 2024, Frontex has concluded working arrangements with the authorities of 18 partners: Albania, Armenia, Azerbaijan, Belarus, Bosnia and Herzegovina, Canada, Cape Verde, Georgia, Kosovo, Moldova, Montenegro, Nigeria, North Macedonia, Russia, Serbia, Turkey, Ukraine, and the United States. The agency has also signed a working arrangement with the Commonwealth of Independent States Border Troop Commanders Council.

===== Repatriation of illegal immigrants =====
The Border and Coast Guard has a supportive capacity to repatriate immigrants residing illegally in the union and is responsible for the coordination of return operations. The decision about who should be returned is always taken by the judicial or administrative authorities of the Member States. The merits of return decisions remain the exclusive responsibility of the Member State, with the appeal against this return decision having to be taken through the respective Member State.

==== Budget and staff ====
Agency staff and budget
Year	Budget (€ m)	Staff	Budget per Staff member (€)
2005	5.5	45	122222
2006	19.2	70	274286
2007	42.1	128	328906
2008	70.4	181	388950
2009	88.3	226	390708
2010	92.8	294	315646
2011	118.2	304	388816
2012	89.6	303	295710
2013	94	302	311258
2014	93.4	311	300322
2015	143.3	309	463754
2016	251	365	589041
2017	302	488	618852
2018	320	643	497667
2019	333	750	444000
2020	460	1223	376124
2021	543	1513	358890
2022	754	2051	367626
2023	797	2223	358525
2024	922	2523	365438
2025	1124	2500+	449600
2026	1205	3500+	344286

==== Equipment ====
In recent years Frontex has procured some equipment of its own. It also charters some airplanes used mainly for surveillance around the Mediterranean Sea.

Name	Origin	Type	Number	Photo	Notes
Aircraft
IAI Heron 1	Israel	Drone	1		
Diamond DA62	Austria	Reconnaissance aircraft	1		Chartered with DEA Ltd. under the Frontex Aerial Surveillance Service (FASS), used mainly in the Mediterranean Sea near Libya operated out of Malta.
Diamond DA42 Twin Star	Austria	Reconnaissance aircraft	1		Chartered with DEA Ltd. under the Frontex Aerial Surveillance Service (FASS), used mainly in the Mediterranean Sea near Libya operated out of Malta.
Beechcraft 350	United States	Reconnaissance aircraft	1		Chartered with DEA Ltd. under the Frontex Aerial Surveillance Service (FASS), used mainly in the Mediterranean Sea near Libya operated out of Malta.
Vehicles
Land Rover Discovery	United Kingdom	Utility vehicle	At least 215		
Volvo XC60	Sweden	Utility vehicle	At least 4		

== History ==
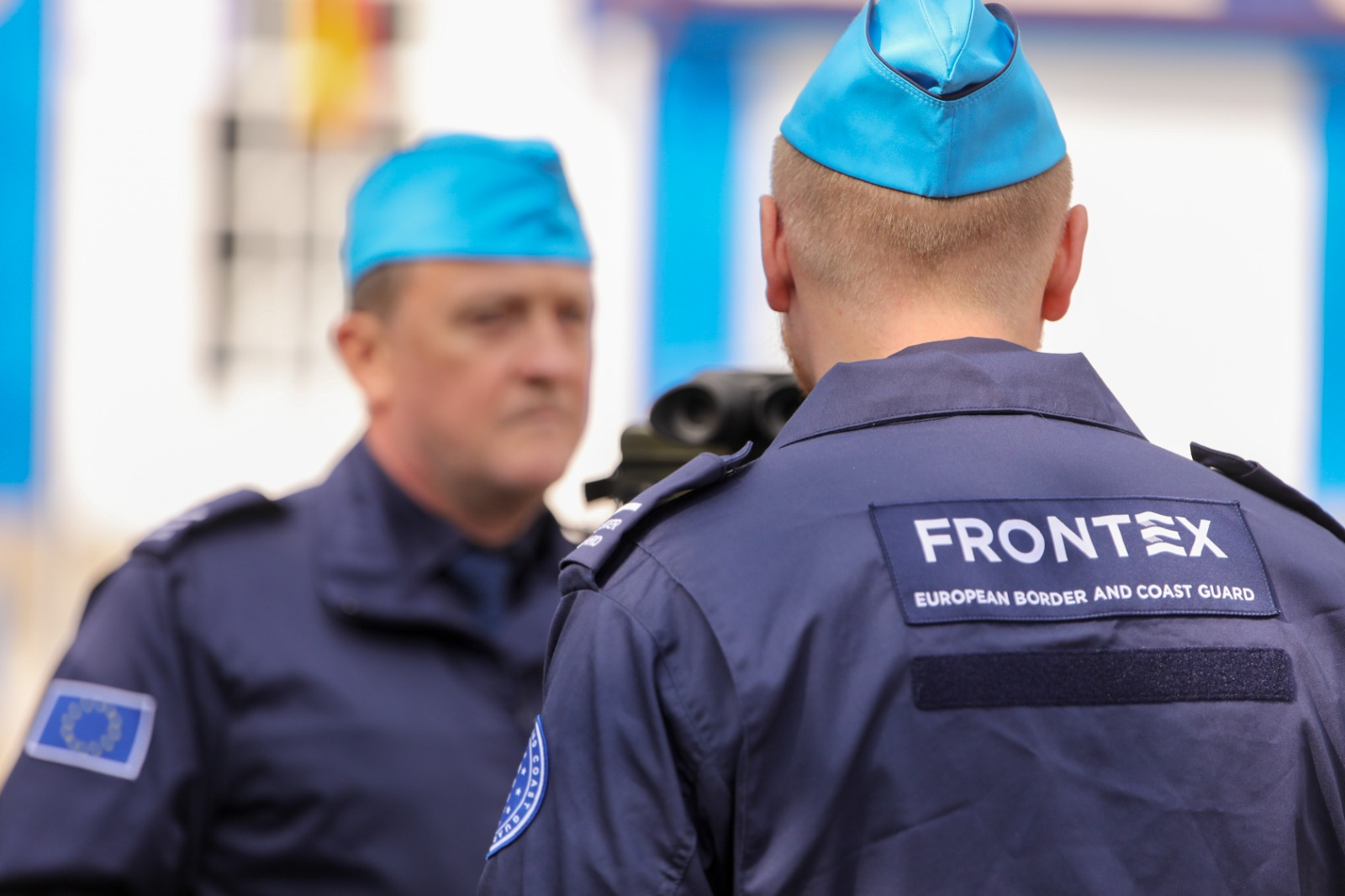
Frontex members at the start of the agency's joint operation with North Macedonia in 2023.

=== Pre-2005 ===
The EU's precursors, the European Communities which were founded in the 1950s, had little mandate to facilitate coordination between member states' border and coast guard authorities. Milestones towards coordination on foreign, security, border and asylum policy matters include the signing of the Schengen Agreement in 1985, the establishment of the European Union in 1993 with the introduction of the Common Foreign and Security Policy pillar, as well as the Amsterdam Treaty's consolidation of Schengen rules within the EU framework in 1999.

=== 2005–2016 ===
Frontex, then officially the European Agency for the Management of Operational Cooperation at the External Borders of the Member States of the European Union, was established by Council of Regulation (EC) 2007–2004. It began work on 3 October 2005 and was the first EU agency to be based in one of the new EU member states from 2004. Frontex' mission is to help European Union member states implement EU rules on external border controls and to coordinate cooperation between member states in external border management. While it remains the task of each member state to control its own borders, Frontex is vested to ensure that they all do so with the same high standard of efficiency. The agency's main tasks according to the Council Regulation are:

- coordinate cooperation between member states in external border management.
- assisting member states in training of national border guards.
- carrying out risk analyses.
- following research relevant for the control and surveillance of external borders.
- helping member states requiring technical and operational assistance at external borders.
- providing member states with the necessary support in organising joint return operations.

The institution was centrally and hierarchically organised with a management board, consisting of one person of each member state as well as two members of the commission. The member states representatives are operational heads of national security services concerned with border guard management. Frontex also has representatives from and works closely with Europol and Interpol. The management board is the leading component of the agency, controlling the personal, financial, and organisational structure, as well as initiating operative tasks in annual work programmes. Additionally, the Board appoints the executive director. The first director was Ilkka Laitinen.

According to its third amended Budget 2015, the agency had in that year 336 employees. Additionally, the agency could make use of 78 employees which had been seconded from the member states. The dependency of the organisation on staff secondments has been identified by external auditors as a risk, since valuable experience may be lost when such staff leave the organisation and return to their permanent jobs.

Special European Border Forces of rapidly deployable border guards, called Rapid Border Intervention Teams (RABIT) who are armed and patrol cross-country land borders, were created by EU interior ministers in April 2007 to assist in border control, particularly on Europe's southern coastlines. Frontex's European Patron Network began work in the Canary Islands in May 2007 and armed border force officers were deployed to the Greece–Turkey border in October 2010.

=== 2016–present ===
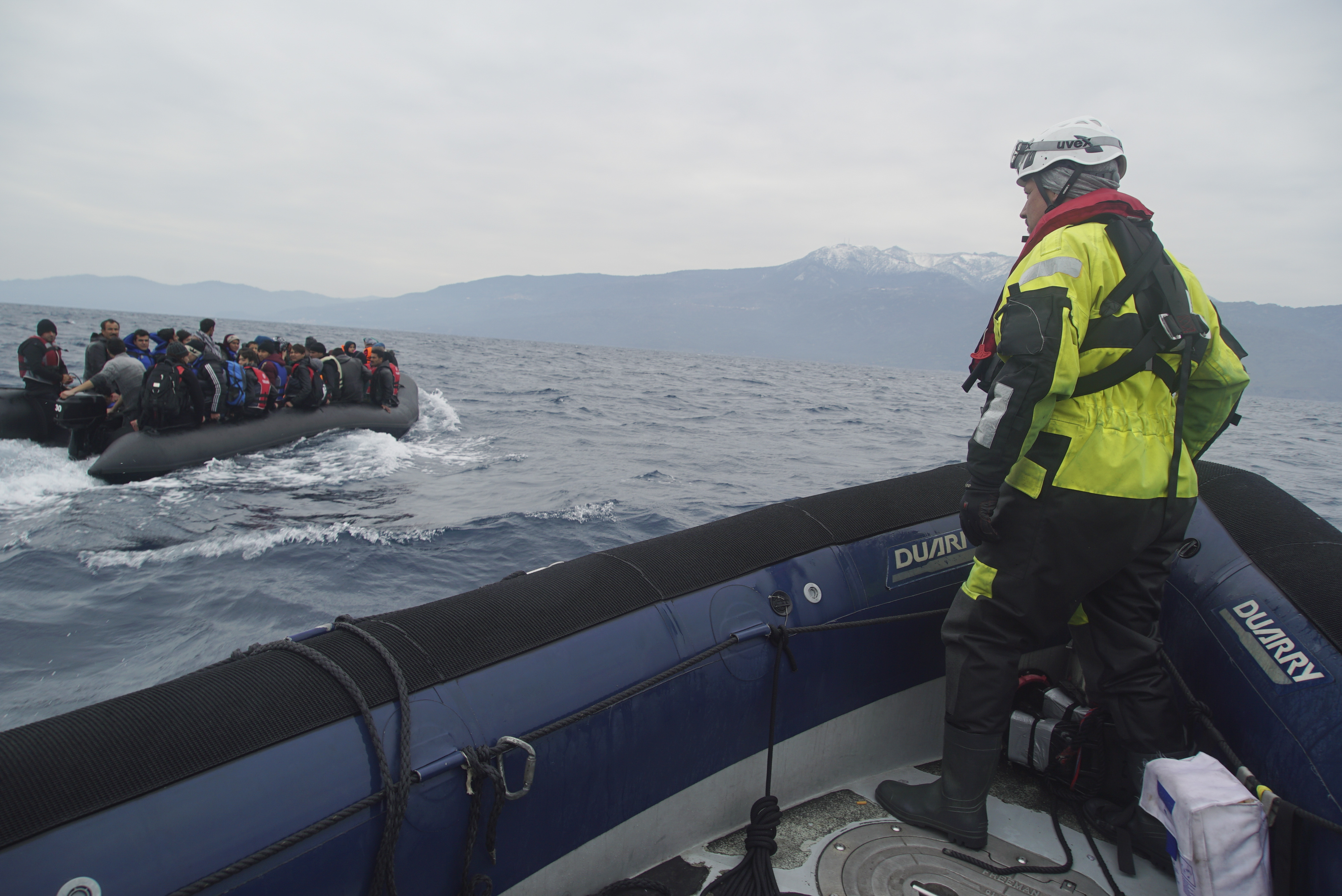
Migrants crossing the Mediterranean Sea on a boat, heading from the Turkish coast to the northeastern Greek island of Lesbos, 29 January 2016

The Commission was prompted to take swift action due to the immigration crisis of 2015, which brought to the forefront the need to improve the security of the external borders of the union. This crisis has also demonstrated that Frontex, which had a limited mandate in supporting the Member States to secure their external borders, had insufficient staff and equipment, and lacked the authority to conduct border management operations and search-and-rescue efforts.

The new Agency was proposed by the European Commission on 15 December 2015 to strengthen Frontex, widely seen as being ineffective in the wake of the European migrant crisis. Support for the proposal has come from France and Germany.

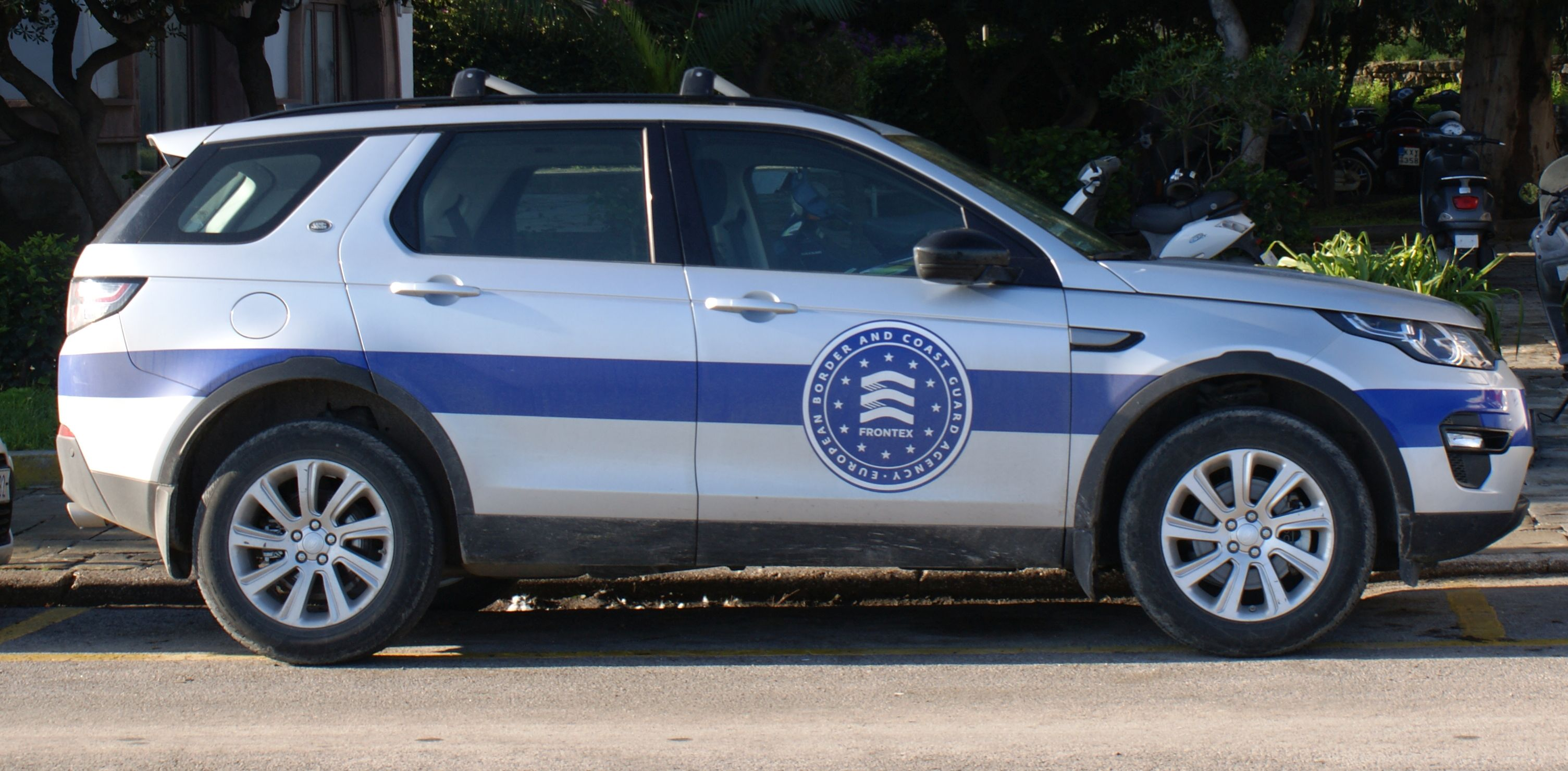
Frontex vehicle on Kos Island

The limitations of the former EU border agency, Frontex, hindered its ability to effectively address and remedy the situation created by the refugee crisis: it relied on the voluntary contributions by Member States as regards resources, it did not have its own operational staff and it did not have an explicit mandate to conduct search and rescue operations. The enhanced Agency will be strengthened and reinforced to address all these issues. The legal grounds for the proposal are article 77, paragraph 2(b) and (d), and article 79, paragraph 2 (c), of the Treaty on the Functioning of the European Union. Article 77 grants competence to the EU to adopt legislation on a "gradual introduction of an integrated management system for external borders," and article 79 authorizes the EU to enact legislation concerning the repatriation of third-country nationals residing illegally within the EU.

On 18 December 2015, the European Council roundly supported the proposal, which was then subjected to the ordinary legislative procedure. The Border and Coast Guard was officially launched on 6 October 2016 at the Bulgarian external border with Turkey.

On 4 December 2019, a regulation amending the mandate of the European Border and Coast Guard Agency (Regulation 2019/1896) entered into force. The revised regulation gave the Agency a broader mandate by extending its powers in the following five areas: standing corps, EUROSUR, return operations, antenna offices, and extended cooperation with the third countries. Ever since Frontex was transformed into the Agency in 2016, the broader mandate has been deemed controversial, and the issue of whether the EU or the member state were competent in border management has also been a matter of debate. While announcing the future of Frontex during his State of the Union speech in 2015, the then European Commission President Jean-Claude Juncker called for "a more efficient" border management and stated that "there is not enough Europe in this Union and there is not enough union in this Union." Although the member states still retain the primary responsibility for border management, the Agency now has a broader mandate to initiate its own operations. Hence, with the growing executive powers of the Agency, the EU has a stronger role in the issue of border management. However, concerns regarding human rights violations are still being voiced, in particular, due to the broader executive powers of the Agency under the revised regulation.

The present agency is not a new body. It does not replace Frontex and it retains the same legal personality. What the Commission draft Regulation aims to do is to strengthen the mandate of the EU border agency, to increase its competences and to better equip it to carry out its operational activities. The new tasks and responsibilities of the Agency need to be reflected by its new name.

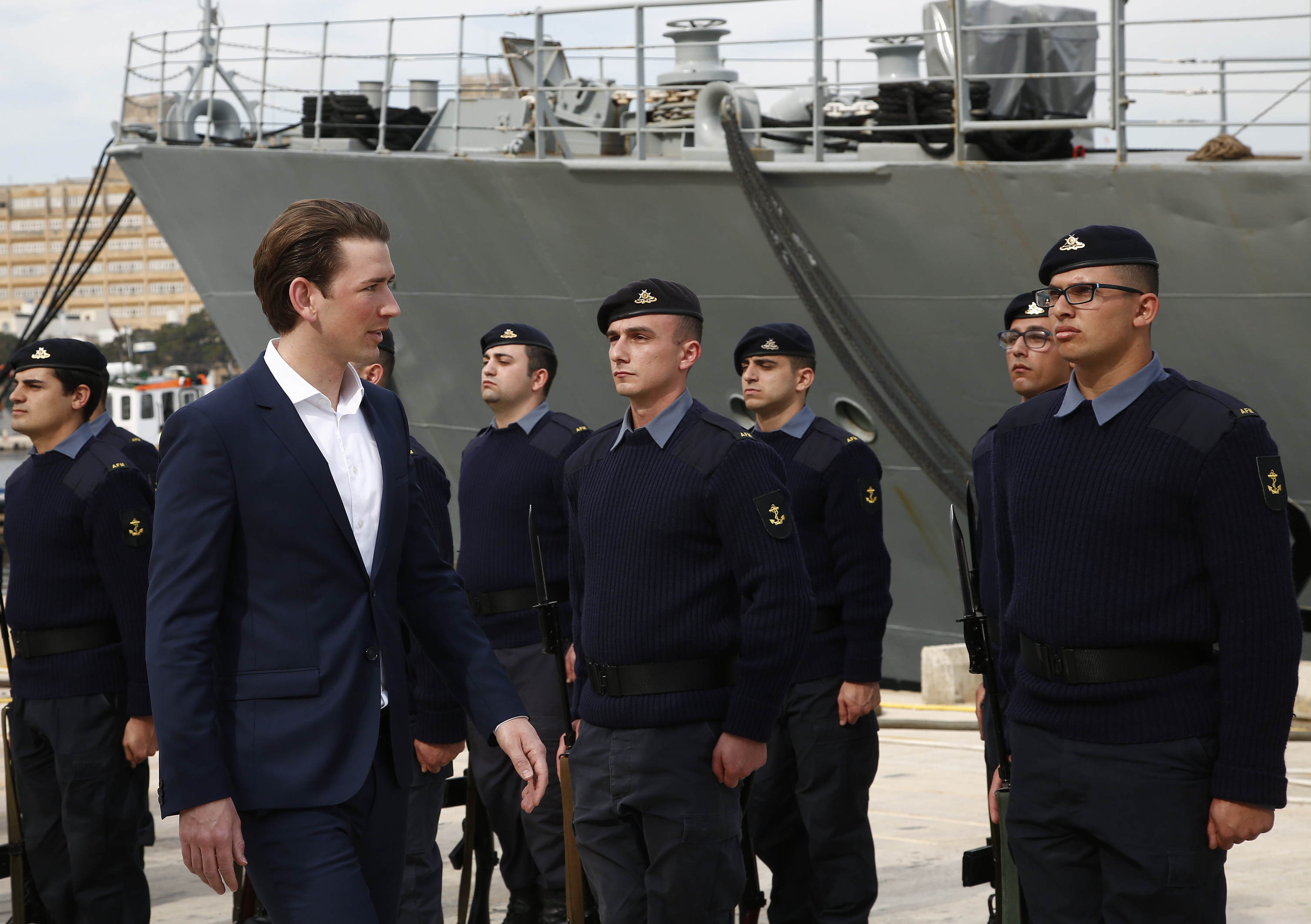
Minister Sebastian Kurz visits a simulation of a border surveillance operation in Malta.

It coordinates its work alongside the European Fisheries Control Agency and European Maritime Safety Agency with regard to coastguard functions. The permanent staff of the Agency was more than doubled between 2015 and 2020.

== Agency-led operations ==
=== 2006 Poseidon ===
"Joint Operation Poseidon" began in 2006, after Greece asked for surveillance by Frontex of the country's sea and land borders between the EU-member Greece and Turkey. The Joint Operation is divided into two branches, the Poseidon Sea Operation which oversees the sea borders of the EU with Turkey in the Mediterranean and Aegean seas, and the Poseidon Land Operation which oversees the southeastern land border of the EU with Turkey on the Evros river. The operation turned permanent and has been expanded subsequently on the year 2011. Near the end of 2015 this operation was replaced by Poseidon Rapid Intervention.

=== 2011 Hermes ===
"Joint Operation Hermes" began on 20 February 2011, after Italy asked for Frontex surveillance of the Mediterranean Sea between Italy and North Africa, the southern border of the EU being in the Sea. The Libyan no-fly zone came into effect subsequently, and combat operations started on 20 March 2011.

The Netherlands has a Coast Guard Dornier 228 aircraft with an air force crew and Portugal, an air force C-295MPA, stationed at Malta and Pantelleria. The number of observed shiploads of people intending to illegally enter into the EU through this sector increased from 1,124 in the first quarter of 2013 to 5,311 in the second quarter of 2013.

African and other would-be illegal immigrants continue to set sail for Italian shores aboard unseaworthy boats and ships. Several of these attempts have ended with capsized boats and hundreds of people drowning in the sea, though the Italian navy has saved thousands of lives in its Operation Mare Nostrum.

=== 2014 Triton ===
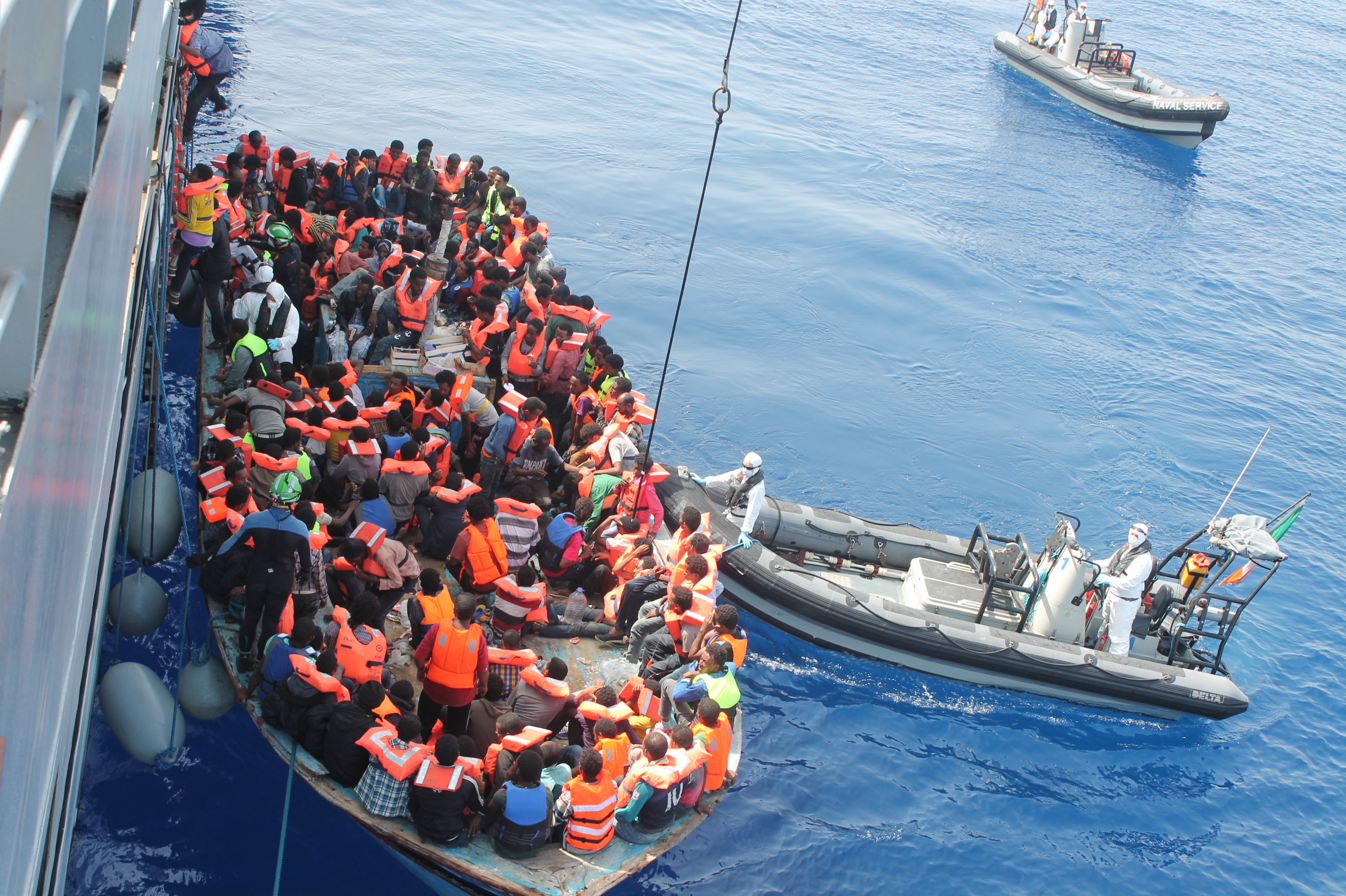
Irish Naval Service personnel from the LÉ Eithne rescuing migrants as part of Operation Triton, June 2015.

Operation Triton is a border security operation conducted by Frontex, the European Union's border security agency. The operation, under Italian control, began on 1 November 2014 and involves voluntary contributions from 15 other European nations (both EU member states and non-members). Current voluntary contributors to Operation Triton are Croatia, Iceland, Finland, Norway, Sweden, Germany, the Netherlands, France, Spain, Ireland, Portugal, Austria, Switzerland, Romania, Poland, Lithuania, Malta and the United Kingdom. The operation was undertaken after Italy ended Operation Mare Nostrum, which had become too costly for a single country to fund; it was costing the Italian government €9 million per month for an operation that lasted 12 months. The Italian government had requested additional funds from the other EU member states but they did not offer the requested support.

"Joint Operation Triton" is under Italian control and focuses on border security within 30 nautical miles of the Italian shore. It began on 1 November 2014 and involves 15 other European nations' volunteering services, both EU member states and non-members. As of 2015 voluntary contributors are Iceland, Finland, Norway, Sweden, Germany, the Netherlands, France, Spain, Portugal, Austria, Switzerland, Romania, Poland, Lithuania, Malta and the United Kingdom. The operation's assets consist of two surveillance aircraft, three ships and seven teams of staff who gather intelligence and conduct screening and process identification. In 2014, its budget was estimated at €2.9 million per month.

After the April 2015 Libya migrant shipwrecks, in which about 800 refugees died, EU ministers proposed on 20 April 2015, to double the size of Operation Triton and to widen its mandate to conduct search and rescue operations across the Mediterranean Sea. Fabrice Leggeri, the head of Frontex, dismissed turning Triton into a search and rescue operation, saying it would "support and fuel the business of traffickers". Instead, he recommended expanding air surveillance of the Maltese waters "anticipate more disasters."

=== 2015 Moria Hotspot ===
On 12 December 2015, it was reported that a newly founded asylum seeker reception centre in Moria, Lesbos, Greece was coordinated, controlled and monitored by Frontex. In this centre, in prison-like conditions, the asylum seekers were reported to undergo swift detention about their status for the purposes of registration. Independent journalists were reported to have had limited access to the facilities. While the reception centre is not in a position to grant refugee status, it was reported that some asylum seekers could be held in the reception camp indefinitely.

== Controversies ==
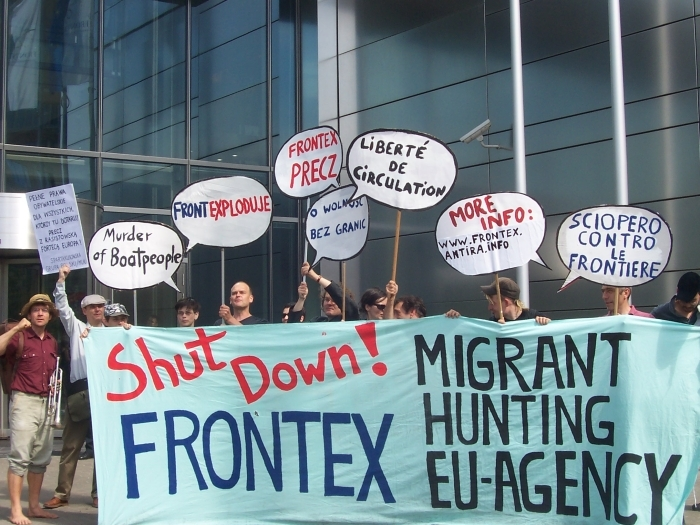
Protests against Frontex in Warsaw in 2008

In an NGO Statement on International Protection presented at the UNHCR Standing Committee in 2008, a broad coalition of non-governmental organisations have expressed their concern, that much of the rescue work by Frontex is in fact incidental to a deterrence campaign so broad and, at times, so undiscriminating, that directly and through third countries – intentionally or not – asylum-seekers are being blocked from claiming protection under the 1951 Refugee Convention.

According to European Council on Refugees and Exiles (ECRE) and British Refugee Council in written evidence submitted to the UK House of Lords inquiry, Frontex fails to demonstrate adequate consideration of international and European asylum and human rights law including the 1951 Convention relating to the Status of Refugees and EU law in respect of access to asylum and the prohibition of refoulement.

In addition, ECRE and the British Refugee Council have expressed concerns about the lack of clarity regarding Frontex's accountability for ensuring compliance with international and EC legal obligations by Member States involved in Frontex's coordinated operations. This is compounded by the lack of transparency, and the absence of independent monitoring and democratic accountability of the Agency.

Reports have surfaced of video footage of FRONTEX violating the law, by helping the Greek coast guard block and push back asylum-seekers and migrants who have reached Greek territorial waters instead of rescuing them, which is their obligation under EU laws and regulations.

Despite a 2012 European Court of Human Rights ruling that refugees should not be returned to Libya, due to the risk of torture and violence, Frontex was criticised in April 2021 for supporting the Libyan Coast Guard to do so.

=== Alleged Turkish airspace violations ===
In September 2009, a Turkish military radar issued a warning to a Latvian helicopter patrolling in the eastern Aegean—part of the EU's Frontex programme to combat illegal immigration—to leave the area. The Turkish General Staff reported that the Latvian Frontex aircraft had violated Turkish airspace west of Didim. According to a Hellenic Air Force announcement, the incident occurred as the Frontex helicopter—identified as an Italian-made Agusta A109—was patrolling in Greek airspace near the small isle of Farmakonisi, which lies on a favourite route used by migrant smugglers ferrying migrants into Greece and the EU from the opposite Turkish coastline. Frontex officials stated that they simply ignored the Turkish warnings as they were not in Turkish airspace and continued their duties. Frontex later took photographs of the Turkish Coast Guard escorting illegal immigrants towards Greek waters and the photos accompanied by written evidence were submitted to EU authorities.

Another incident took place in October 2009 in the airspace above the eastern Aegean Sea, off the island of Lesbos. On 20 November 2009, the Turkish General Staff issued a press note alleging that an Estonian Border Guard aircraft Let L-410 UVP taking off from Kos on a Frontex mission had violated Turkish airspace west of Söke.

=== 2020–2021 OLAF Raid & EU Ombudsman Investigation ===
On 7 December 2020, the EU's anti-fraud watchdog, OLAF, raided the offices of Frontex Executive Director Fabrice Leggeri, as well as his head of Cabinet Thibauld de La Haye Jousselin as part of an investigation into allegations of staff harassment, misconduct and migrant pushbacks. According to an internal document seen by the Greek newspaper Ekathimerini, Leggeri "actively resisted" the recruitment of the required 40 fundamental rights officers provided for in the regulation of the new European Border and Coast Guard Agency, answering frequent questions from agency staff in early 2020 that "it is not a priority and "repeatedly made it clear to staff" that "Frontex is not an expensive lifeguard service." Frontex operations staff were made to understand that "reporting pushbacks involving Frontex personnel is not a route to popularity or promotion" within the agency. The story also accuses Leggeri of being in charge of a "comically incompetent" human resources department that formally offered jobs to large numbers of Standing Corps personnel and then withdrew them the next day. The paper further reported that no provision had yet been made for the new border guard "Standing Corps" to carry firearms legally over EU borders. In January 2021, EU Commissioner Ylva Johansson called for the EU ombudsman to open an inquiry.

In 2020, the European Parliament refused to approve the Agency's budget because of dissatisfaction with its management. The responsible committee cited sexual harassment within the Agency, and notably the suicide of a staff member, "related to alleged practices of sexual harassment"; in total, 17 cases of sexual harassment in the agency were reported in 2020, of which 15 were closed without follow-up.

According to the UK's Financial Times, on 12 January 2021, the EU's "embattled border and coastguard agency" was ridiculed for tweeting a 77-second short film celebrating its new uniforms on the same day that the bloc's anti-fraud office, OLAF, confirmed it would investigate the agency.

=== Covering up migrant pushback in Greece ===
In 2020, ships of Frontex were accused of carrying out illegal pushbacks of migrants attempting to reach mainland Europe via Greek waters. In such pushbacks, migrants already in European waters are sent back to areas outside the borders of the European Union. These pushbacks violate the principle of non-refoulement under international law.

Frontex's involvement in these illegal practices follows from an analysis of open source sources, leaked documents, imagery and conversations with both migrants and Frontex staff conducted by a journalistic research collective involving Bellingcat and Der Spiegel, among others.

=== 2021 "Hiring Chaos" and the Frontex "Potemkin Corps" ===
In early 2021, reports emerged in the media of serious recruitment and HR issues at Frontex. At least one report spoke of a "comically incompetent" HR department at the agency. Reported problems included first-person accounts of offers for the Standing Corps being made and then withdrawn the following day; recruits being brought to Poland for training only to be told they had failed a medical test the previous month and then abandoned; inadequate provisions made for COVID protection during training; and nonexistent communication with new staff about key practical issues. These issues, combined with the fact that the Standing Corps cannot be armed under current regulations because the agency's new 2019 mandate did not include the necessary legal basis under which it can acquire, register, store and transport firearms, have led some to refer to the Standing Corps internally as a "Potemkin Corps", i.e. something for show only.

In June 2021, former FRONTEX deputy director Gil Arias Fernández criticised the agency's recruitment process, stating that it had no safeguards in place to prevent infiltration by far-right extremists.

=== Misleading the EU Parliament and unregistered meetings with lobbyists ===
In February 2021, Frontex was accused of its staff meeting "with scores of unregistered lobbyists that represent the weapons, surveillance and biometrics industries". The investigation also indicated that Frontex misled the European Parliament. In 2018, the agency told MEPs in response to a question: "Frontex only met with registered lobbyists who are registered in the EU Transparency Register ... no meetings were held in 2017." But according to the documents obtained, Frontex "held at least four meetings with industry" that year, CEO wrote. "Of the 24 private bodies that participated in these meetings – mostly companies – over half (58 percent or 14 bodies) were not registered in the EU Transparency Register." Overall, their research found that from 2017 to 2019, Frontex met with 138 private groups: 108 companies, 10 research centres or think tanks, 15 universities and one non-governmental organization. Human rights organizations were notably absent.

=== Violations of human rights ===
On 14 August 2022, the Euro-Mediterranean Human Rights Monitor released a report documenting the effects of European Union Commission's Intrusive surveillance program for migrants and asylum seekers, that the EU Commission's intrusive migrant surveillance program works dangerously and illegally to collect detailed information about migrants and asylum seekers, such as genetic and biometric data and DNA fingerprints, their religious beliefs and their sexual orientation. Moreover, the Euro-Med indicated that the program would criminalize innocent people, impede their right to seek asylum, facilitate the procedures for expulsion and return them to their countries, and consolidate the misperception linking asylum and terrorism.

== See also ==
- Schengen Area
- Common Security and Defence Policy
- Area of freedom, security and justice
- Police and Judicial Co-operation in Criminal Matters
- European Asylum Curriculum
- Asylum in the European Union
- Schengen Agreement
  - Schengen Information System
  - Eurodac
  - European Border Surveillance System
- Global Monitoring for Environment and Security ('Copernicus Programme')
- External border of the European Union
- Effect of Brexit on Gibraltar

=== Existing agencies ===
- European Fisheries Control Agency
- eu-LISA
- European Maritime Safety Agency
- European Border Surveillance System
- European Union Agency for Law Enforcement Cooperation ('Europol')
- European Asylum Support Office
