= Western Bulgaria =

Western Bulgaria is a region in Southeastern Europe. Its people primarily speak Western Bulgarian dialects.

Western Bulgaria had specific meanings or mapped geographically to specific entities during certain time periods, such as:

- mid 7th century (600s): the western part of Old Great Bulgaria
- late 7th century (600s) to early 11th century (1000s): the western part of the First Bulgarian Empire
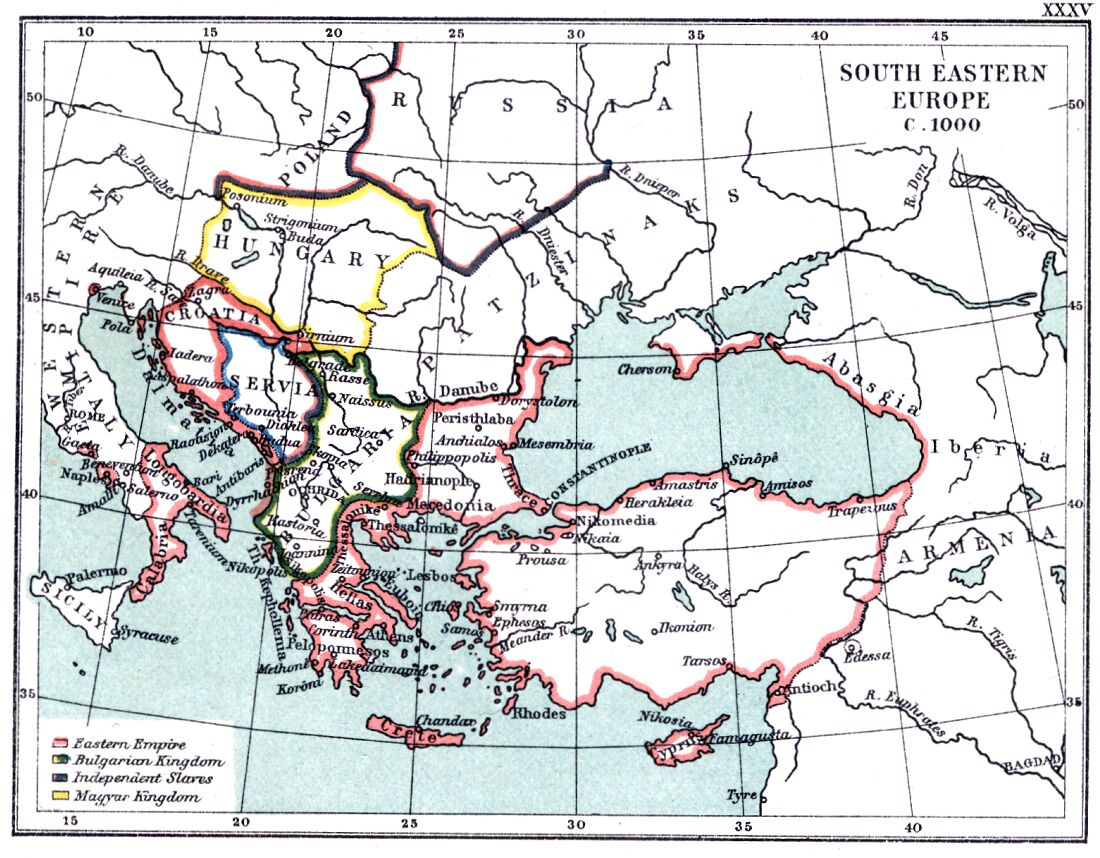
  - late 10th century (900s) to early 11th century (1000s): the First Bulgarian Empire during its decline and fall due to the Byzantine conquest of Bulgaria, ruled by the Cometopuli dynasty, shown with a green outline in this map from c. 1000:
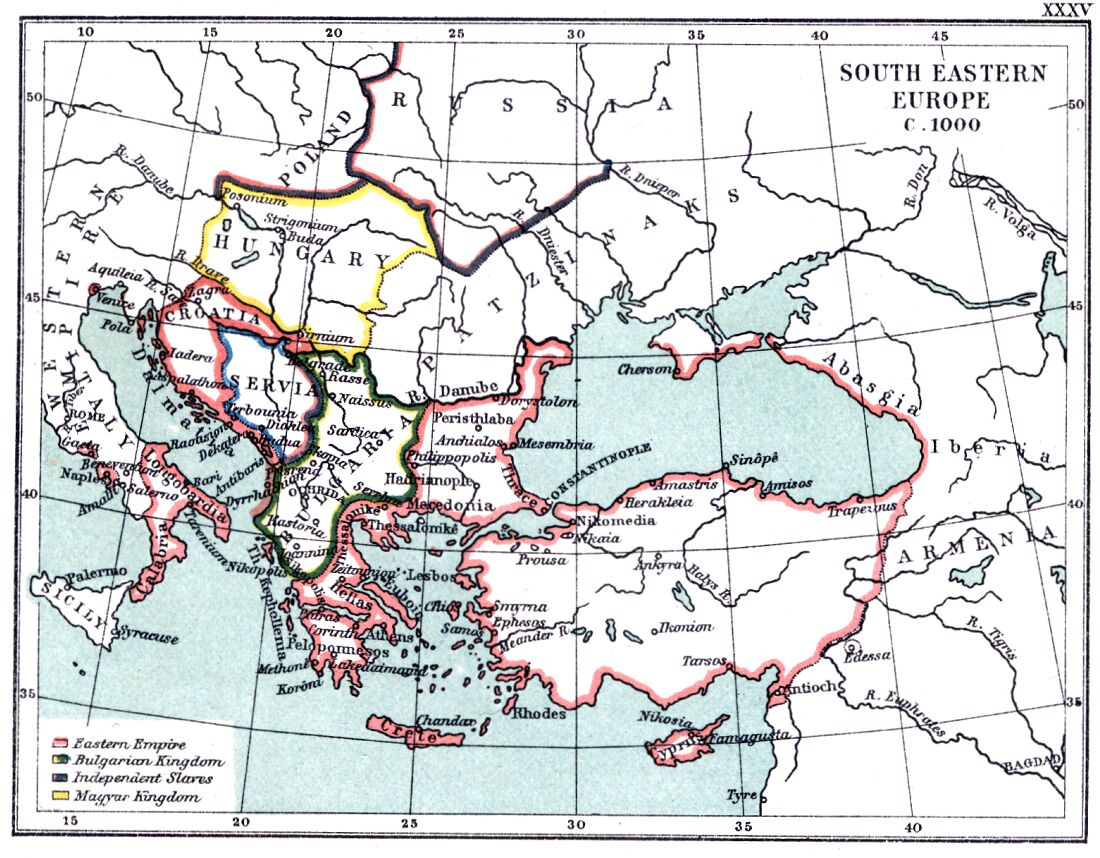
- early 11th century (1000s) to late 12th century (1100s): Bulgaria (theme), a province of the Byzantine Empire
  - mid 11th century (1000s): the territory of the Uprising of Petar Delyan
  - late 11th century (1000s): the territory of the Uprising of Georgi Voyteh
- late 12th century (1100s) to mid 14th century (1300s): the western part of the Second Bulgarian Empire (or perhaps its entirety, in contrast to Volga Bulgaria)
- mid 14th century (1300s) to mid 19th century (1800s): the Bulgarian part of Rumelia Eyalet in the Ottoman Empire
- mid-to-late 19th century (1800s): the western Bulgarian part of Danube vilayet in the Ottoman Empire, particularly the Sanjaks of Vidin and Sofia
- late 19th century (1800s): a hypothetical autonomous province of the Ottoman Empire proposed by the Constantinople Conference
- late 19th century (1800s) to early 20th century (1900s): the western part of the Principality of Bulgaria
- early-to-mid 20th century (1900s): the western part of the Kingdom of Bulgaria
- present: The provinces of Bulgaria that have part of its western border (with Serbia and North Macedonia) are, from north to south: Vidin, Montana, Sofia (which mostly encloses Sofia City), Pernik, Kyustendil, and Blagoevgrad. Vratsa and Pazardzhik are adjacent and still roughly within the westernmost third of the country.

== See also ==
- Geography of Bulgaria
- Western Outlands
- Eastern Bulgaria (disambiguation)
- Western (disambiguation)
- Bulgaria (disambiguation)
