= Leggeri =

Leggeri is an Italian surname. Notable people with the surname include:

- Fabrice Leggeri (born 1968), French business director
- Manuela Leggeri (born 1976), Italian volleyball player
