= Hungary–Serbia border =

The Hungary–Serbia border separates the Hungary from Serbia in Central Europe. It has a length of 175 km (109 mi). The current border was established in the Treaty of Trianon after World War I. during World War II there were changes, but these were reverted after the war.

The border starts from the tripoint with Croatia near the hamlet of Hóduna and the Danube river, although the exact location of the tripoint is disputed due to a disagreement between Croatia and Serbia about the exact location of their border. It then continues eastward until it reaches the tripoint with Romania near Kübekháza.

== Border crossings ==
There are currently 10 functioning land border crossings between the two countries, one of which is a railway crossing. Some crossings are only open to EEA, Swiss and Serbian nationals. The following is a table of the crossing points, listed from West to East:

(Hungary) Hungarian checkpoint	County	(Serbia) Serbian checkpoint	District	Route in Hungary	Route in Serbia	Status	Opening times
Hercegszántó	Bács-Kiskun	Bački Breg	West Bačka			International	24/7
Bácsszentgyörgy	Bács-Kiskun	Rastina	West Bačka	local road	local road	EEA/Serbian only	7:00-19:00
Bácsalmás	Bács-Kiskun	Bajmok	North Bačka	local road	local road	International	7:00-19:00
Tompa	Bács-Kiskun	Kelebija	North Bačka			International	24/7
Kelebia	Bács-Kiskun	Subotica	North Bačka	Railway	Railway	International	24/7
Ásotthalom	Csongrád-Csanád	Backi Vinogradi	North Bačka	local road	M-101	EEA/Serbian only	7:00-19:00
Röszke 1	Csongrád-Csanád	Horgoš 1	North Banat			International	24/7
Röszke 2	Csongrád-Csanád	Horgoš 2	North Banat		M-100	EEA/Serbian only	7:00-19:00
Röszke	Csongrád-Csanád	Horgoš	North Banat	Railway	Railway	Closed	Closed
Tiszasziget	Csongrád-Csanád	Đala	North Banat	local road	M-103	EEA/Serbian only	7:00-19:00
Kübekháza	Csongrád-Csanád	Rabe	North Banat	Road 43112	M-302	EEA/Serbian only	7:00-19:00

== See also ==
- Hungarian border barrier
