= Romania–Serbia border =

International border between Romania and Serbia

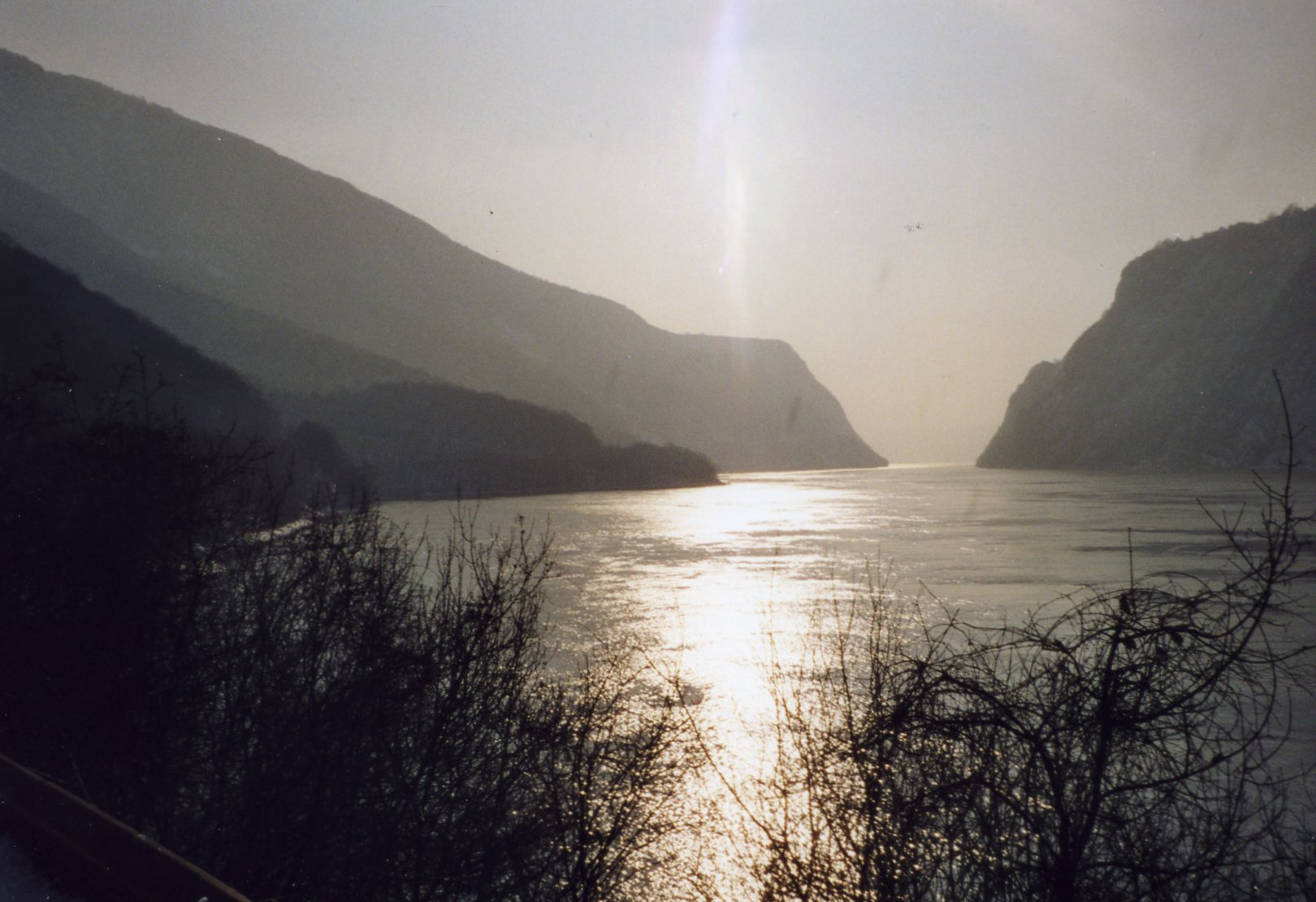
- Map of the Iron Gates and the Danube river, which forms the border between Romania and Serbia

Characteristics
- Entities: Romania Serbia
- Length: 546.4 kilometres (339.5 mi)

History
- Established: 1859 (border at the Danube), 1918 (border at Banat); Unification of Moldavia and Wallachia (1859); Serbian occupation of Banat (1918)
- Current shape: 1924; Romanian–Yugoslav land swap
- Treaties: Treaty of Trianon

The Romania–Serbia border is the international border between Romania and Serbia, established after the formation of the United Principalities of Moldavia and Wallachia (later renamed to Romania) in 1859 and the partition of Banat after the Treaty of Trianon. The border has a length of 546.4 kilometres (339.5 miles), of which 256.8 kilometres (159.6 mi) are terrestrial (Banat) and 289.6 kilometres (179.9 mi) are fluvial (Timok Valley–Wallachia).

Both countries have several border crossing points. Many of these points were temporarily closed in 2020 as a result of the COVID-19 pandemic. The point where the borders of Hungary, Romania and Serbia coincide is known as the "Triplex Confinium". Precisely, the towns that meet each other are Kübekháza (Hungary), Beba Veche (Romania) and Rabe (Serbia). Cultural events are held in this point every year.

== Border crossings ==
There are currently 10 functioning border crossings between the two countries, two of which are railway crossings. The following is a table of the crossing points, listed from north to south:

(Romania) Romanian checkpoint	County	(Serbia) Serbian checkpoint	District	Route in Romania	Route in Serbia	Status
Vălcani	Timiș	Vrbica	North Banat	DN59F	Local road	Local
Lunga	Timiș	Nakovo	North Banat	DN59E		Local
Jimbolia	Timiș	Kikinda	North Banat	Railway	Railway	International
Jimbolia	Timiș	Srpska Crnja	Central Banat			International
Foeni	Timiș	Jaša Tomić	Central Banat	DN59D	M-129	International
Stamora Moravița	Timiș	Vršac	South Banat	Railway	Railway	International
Moravița	Timiș	Vatin	South Banat			International
Naidăş	Caraș-Severin	Kaluđerovo	South Banat			International
Porțile de Fier 1	Mehedinți	Đerdap 1	Bor	adjacent to		International
Porțile de Fier 2	Mehedinți	Đerdap 2	Bor		M-16B	International

== See also ==
- Borders of Romania
- Borders of Serbia
- Romanian–Yugoslav land swap
