= 2024 Bureau of the European Parliament election =

2024 President of the European Parliament election
← 2022	16 July 2024	2027 →

Needed to win: Majority of the votes cast 623 votes cast, 312 needed for a majority
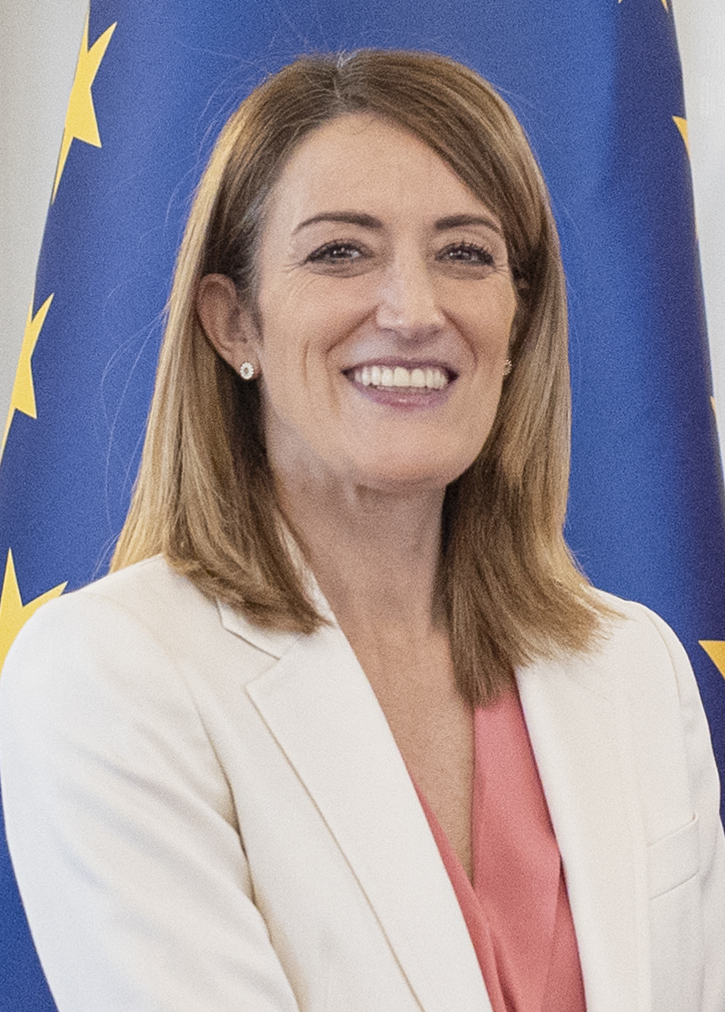

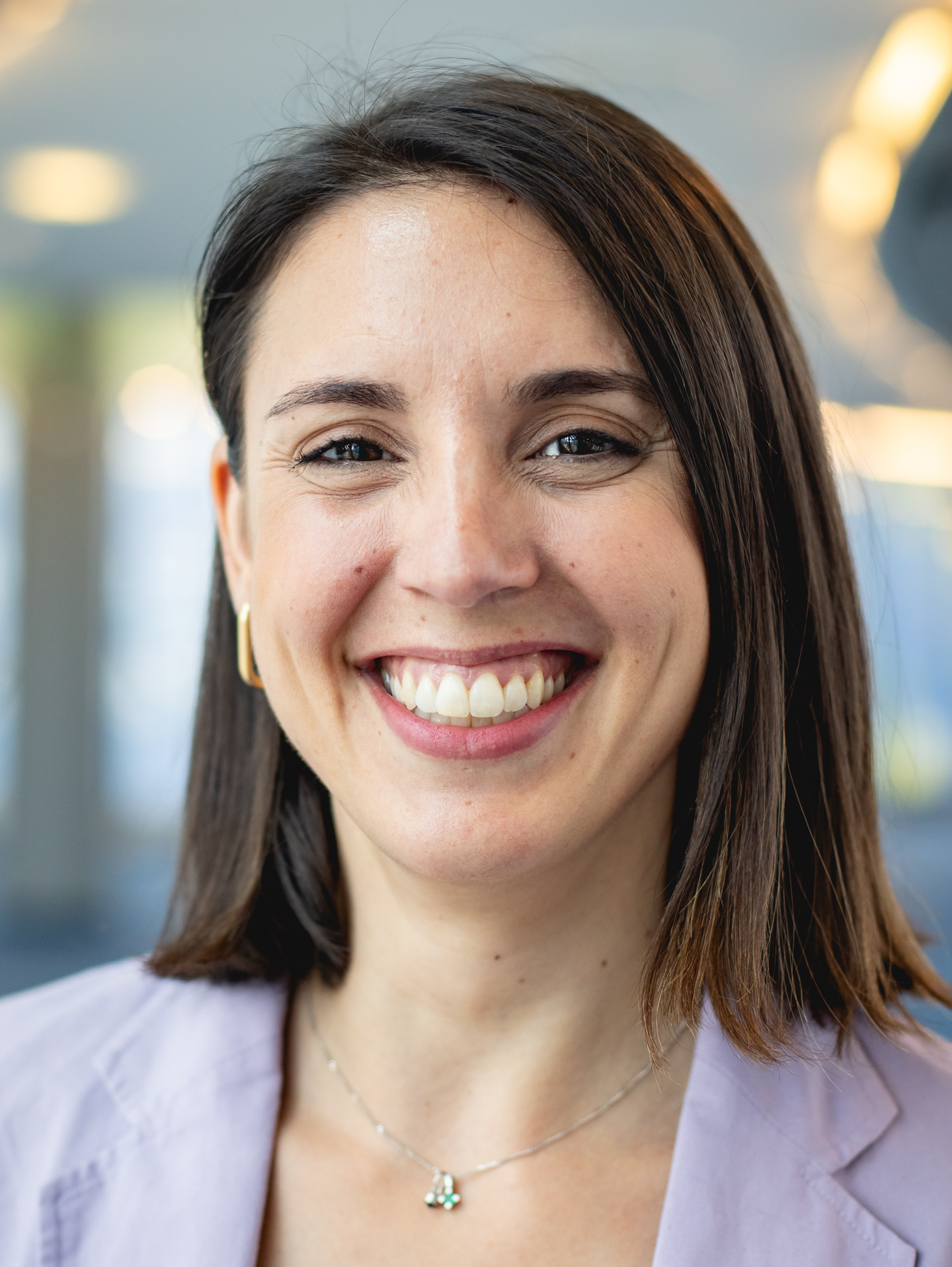
Candidate	Roberta Metsola	Irene Montero
Group	EPP	The Left
Constituency	Malta	Spain
Members' vote	562	61
Percentage	90.20%	9.79%
President before election
Roberta Metsola
EPP
Elected President
Roberta Metsola
EPP

The Bureau of the European Parliament election was held on 16 and 17 July 2024, where members of the European Parliament, elected in the 2024 election, voted to elect its Bureau for the 2.5 years term during the Tenth European Parliament. On 16 July, Roberta Metsola was elected president of the European Parliament together with 14 vice-presidents. On 17 July, 5 quaestors were elected.

== Background ==
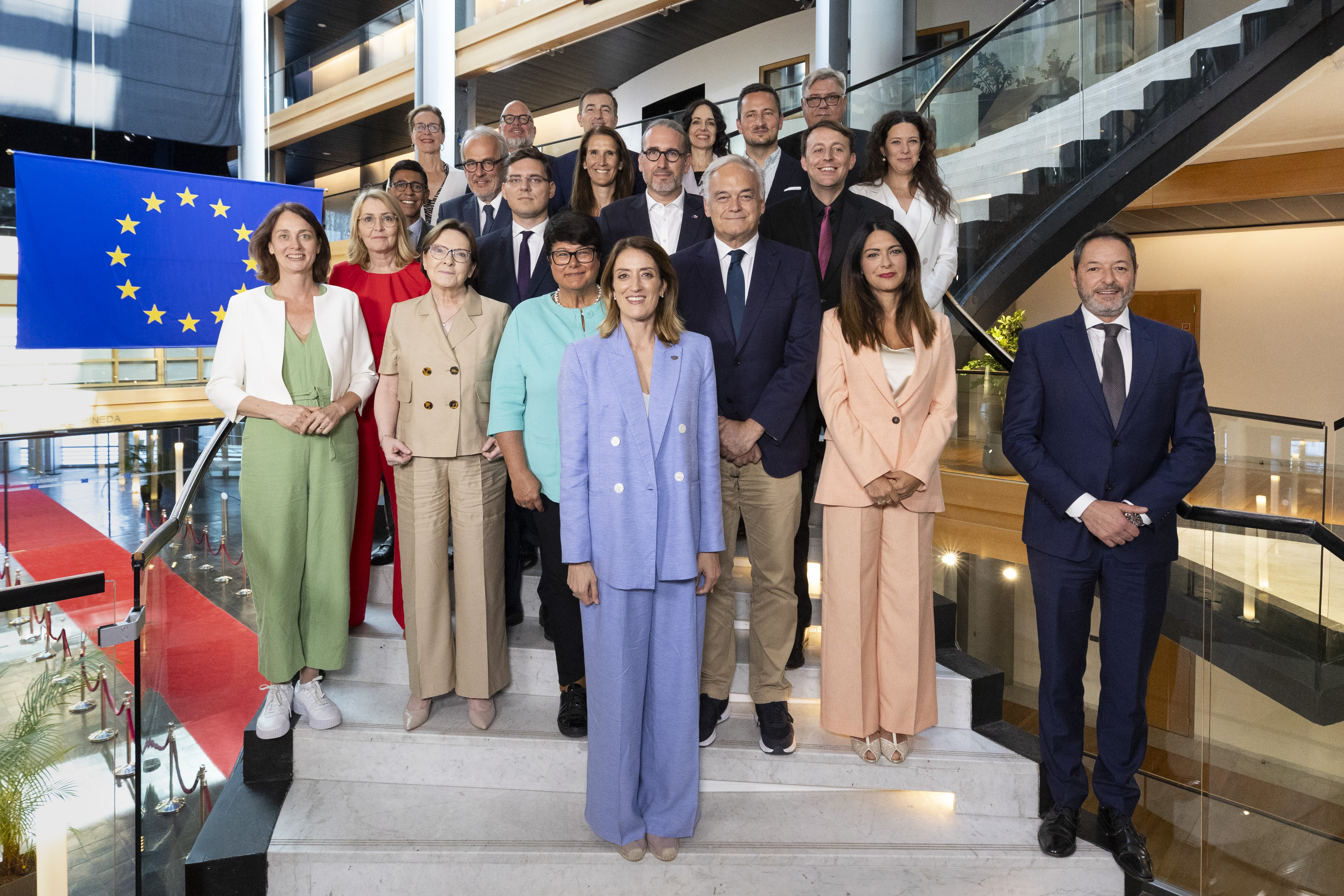
Constitutive meeting of the Bureau of the European Parliament (1st Half of the term)

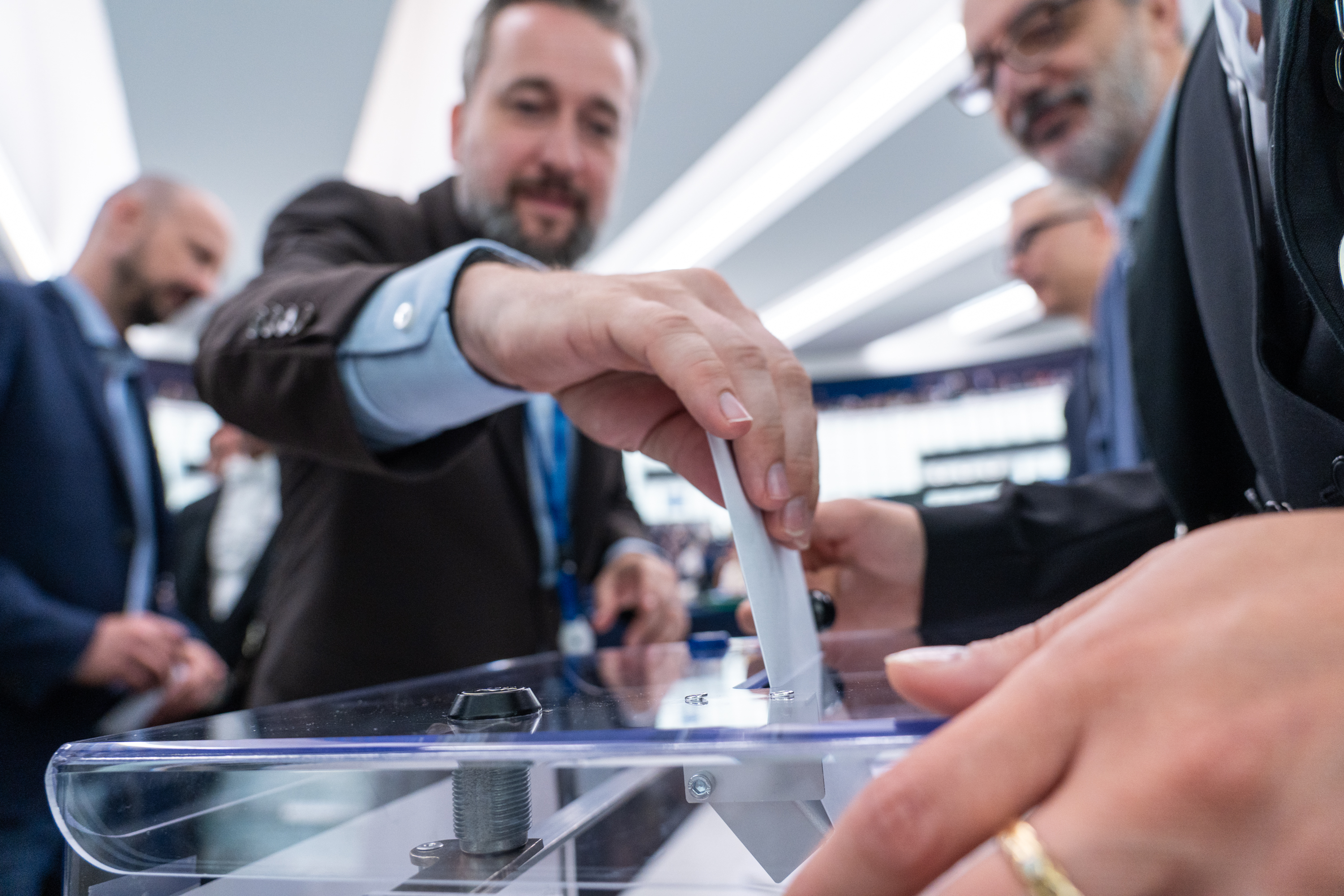
The voting process

The Bureau of the European Parliament is responsible for matters relating to the budget, administration, organisation and staff. It is composed of the President of the European Parliament along with all 14 vice-presidents and the 5 quaestors.

They are elected with a secret ballot for two and a half years with a renewable term. According to the Parliament's Rules of Procedure, nominations are put forward either by a political group or by a group of MEPs reaching the low threshold (1/20th of MEPs, or 36 out of 720 in 2024).

Traditionally, the political groups informally agree on the distribution of positions (president, vice-presidents and quaestors) using proportional representation, specifically the D'Hondt method. At the same time, some groups refuse to cooperate with PfE and ESN applying a so-called cordone sanitaire.

== Election of the President ==
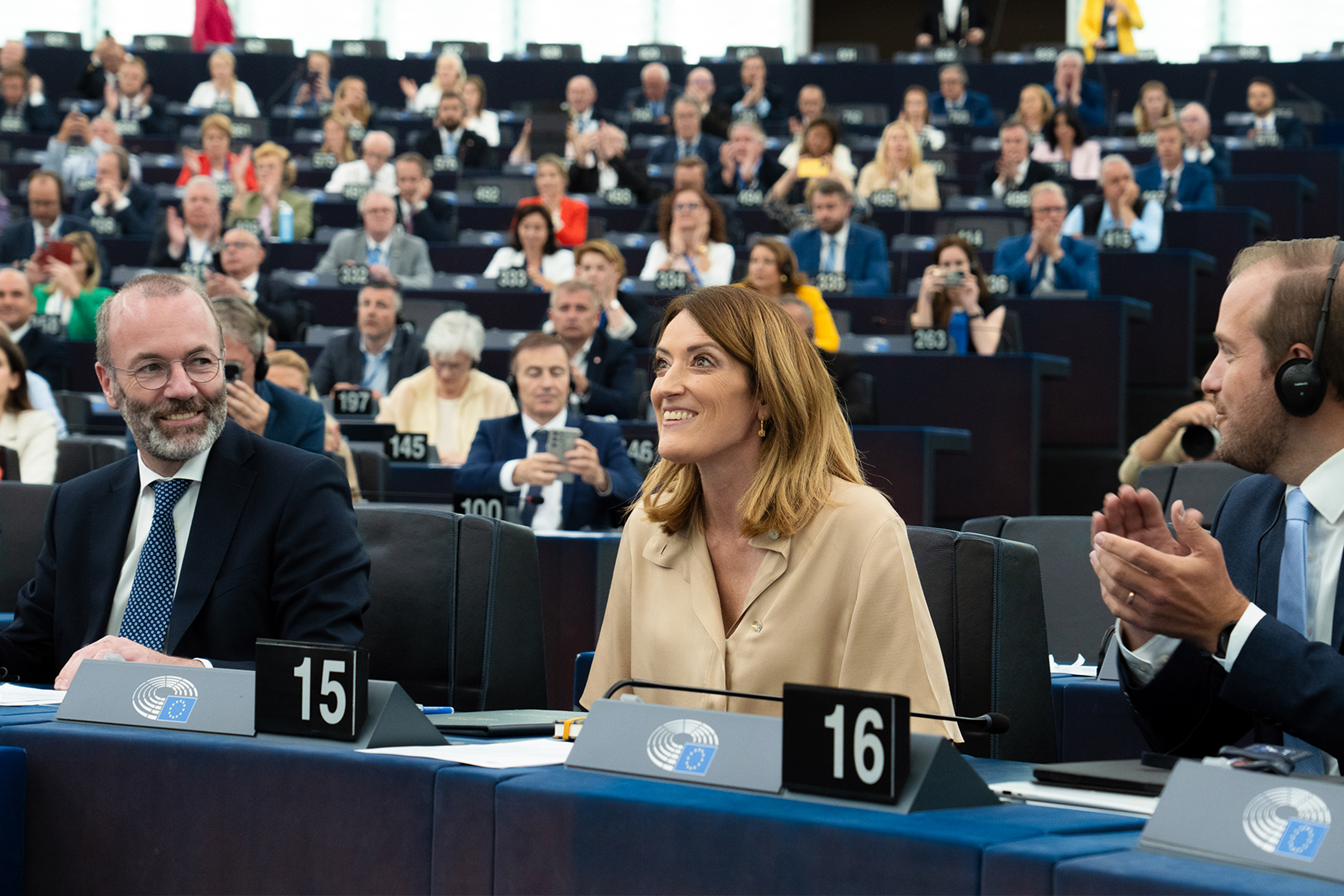
Roberta Metsola re-elected as President of the European Parliament

The President of the European Parliament is elected through a secret vote of MEPs, requiring an absolute majority of cast votes for the election. Article 14 of the Treaty on European Union states that Parliament elects its president from among its Members.

On 16 July 2024, Roberta Metsola was re-elected as President of the European Parliament with 562 votes.

Candidate			Votes
Roberta Metsola	Malta	EPP	562
Irene Montero	Spain	The Left	61
Voted			699
Votes cast			623
Blank or void			76
Votes needed for election			312
Source: European Parliament

== Election of the Vice-Presidents ==
Fourteen vice-presidents are elected through a single secret ballot process, requiring an absolute majority of cast votes for their selection. In situations where the number of successful candidates falls below 14, a second round of voting is conducted to allocate the remaining positions following identical conditions. Should a third round of voting become necessary, a simple majority suffices to occupy the remaining seats.

During each round of voting, MEPs have the capacity to cast votes for as many candidates as there are available seats for that particular round. However, they are obligated to vote for more than half of the total positions to be filled. The precedence of Vice Presidents is established by the order in which they are elected, and in cases of a tie, seniority is determined by age.

On 16 July 2024, the S&D group got 5 vice-presidents elected, the EPP 3, Renew 2 and the G/EFA 1. In the second round the ECR group got 2 vice-presidents elected and The Left 1. The PfE and ESN candidates remained out due to the cordon sanitaire.

Candidate			Votes	
Candidate			1st Ballot	2nd Ballot
Sabine Verheyen (elected First Vice-President)	Germany	EPP	604	
Ewa Kopacz	Poland	EPP	572	
Esteban González Pons	Spain	EPP	478	
Katarina Barley	Germany	S&D	450	
Pina Picierno	Italy	S&D	405	
Victor Negrescu	Romania	S&D	394	
Martin Hojsík	Slovakia	Renew	393	
Christel Schaldemose	Denmark	S&D	378	
Javi López	Spain	S&D	377	
Sophie Wilmès	Belgium	Renew	371	
Nicolae Ştefănuță	Romania	G/EFA	347	
Roberts Zīle	Latvia	ECR	306	490
Antonella Sberna	Italy	ECR	323	314
Younous Omarjee	France	The Left	272	311
Klára Dostálová	(Czech Republic) Czechia	PfE	214	177
Fabrice Leggeri	France	PfE	209	116
Ewa Zajączkowska-Hernik	Poland	ESN	102	46
Voted			701	674
Votes cast			665	609
Blank or void			36	65
Votes needed for election			333	305
Source: European Parliament				

== Election of the Quaestors ==
Five quaestors are elected through a single secret ballot process, following the same procedure as that for the election of vice-presidents.

On 17 July 2024, the EPP group got 2 quaestors elected, while the S&D and Renew groups 1 each. The ECR got 1 quaestor elected in the second round, while the PfE candidate remained out due to the cordon sanitaire.

Candidate			Votes	
Candidate			1st Ballot	2nd Ballot
Andrey Kovatchev	Bulgaria	EPP	559	
Marc Angel	Luxembourg	S&D	461	
Miriam Lexmann	Slovakia	EPP	459	
Fabienne Keller	France	Renew	398	
Kosma Złotowski	Poland	ECR	260	335
Pál Szekeres	Hungary	PfE	174	130
Voted			669	612
Votes cast			641	465
Blank or void			28	147
Votes needed for election			321	233
Source: European Parliament
