= Retford Gamston Airport =

Airport in Nottinghamshire, England

Retford Gamston Airport Gamston Airport
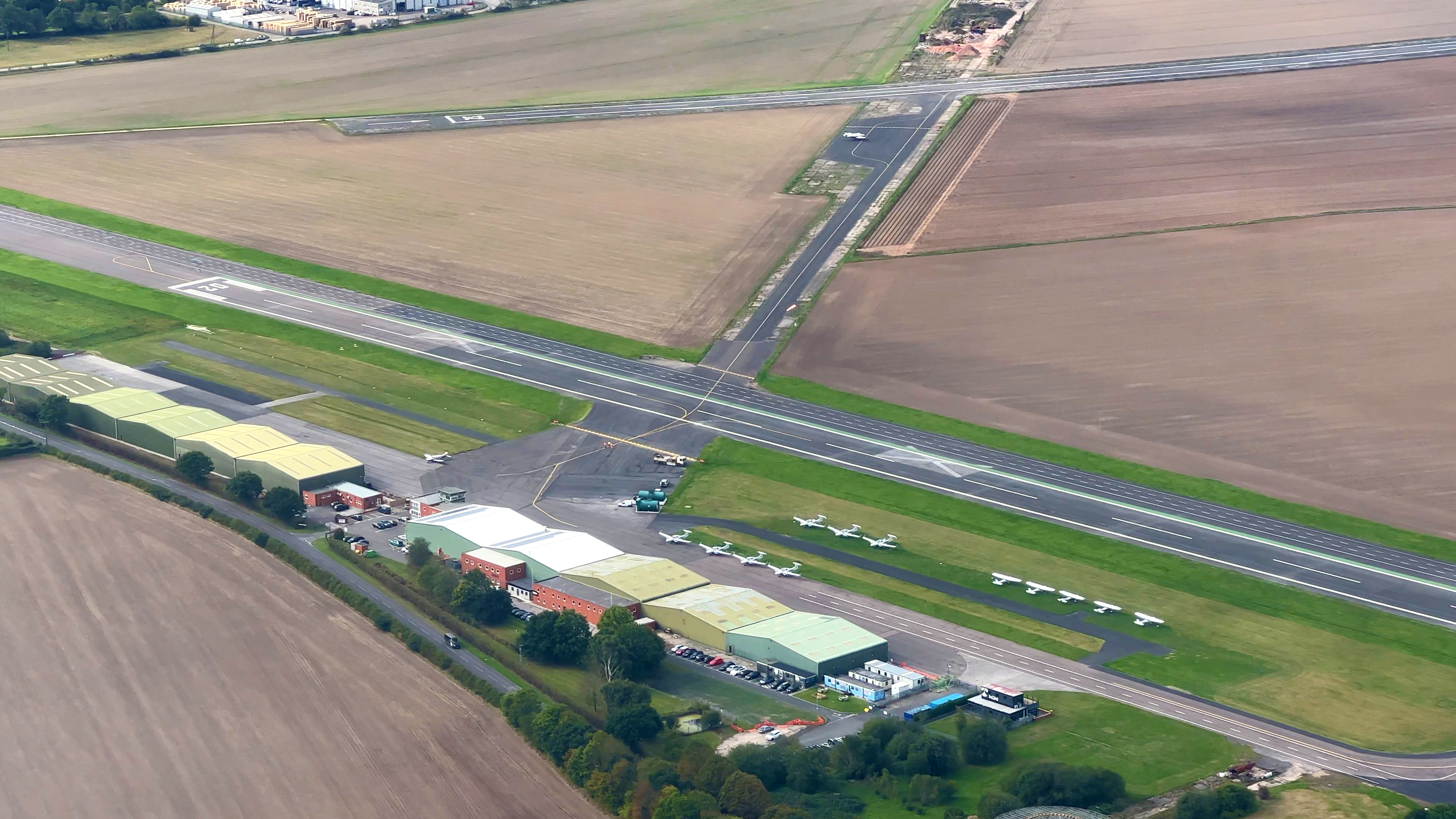
- IATA: none; ICAO: EGNE

Summary
- Airport type: Private
- Operator: Gamston Aviation Limited
- Location: Retford, Nottinghamshire, England
- Elevation AMSL: 87 ft / 27 m
- Coordinates: 53°16′50″N 000°57′05″W
- Website: www.retfordairport.co.uk

Map
- Location in Nottinghamshire

Runways
Direction	Length		Surface
Direction	m	ft	Surface
02/20	1,199	3,934	Asphalt
14/32	842	2,762	(unlicensed rwy)
- Sources: UK AIP at NATS

Retford Gamston Airport (ICAO: EGNE) is a small English airport, located 2 miles (3.2 km) south of Retford and close to Gamston, Bassetlaw in Nottinghamshire. It is used mainly for small private aircraft as well as a base for several private flying schools. Two AOC-holders, IAS Medical and Diamond Executive Aviation, are also based on the airfield.

Retford (Gamston) Aerodrome has a CAA Ordinary Licence (Number P783) that allows flights for the public transport of passengers or for flying instruction as authorised by the licensee (Gamston Aviation Limited).

== History ==
Gamston airport was originally built as a Royal Air Force aerodrome with three runways in a triangular configuration (of which only one remains in common usage), and came into service in December 1942. It was part of the RAF Flying Training Command as well as a satellite to RAF Ossington, 8 miles (13 km) to the south. In May 1943 the field was transferred to No. 93 Group RAF, Bomber Command Training.

In June the same year No. 82 Operational Training Unit arrived with Wellington Mk. III and Mk. X bombers, Miles Martinets (used as target tugs) and Hawker Hurricanes. A year later the unit became No. 86 Operational Training Unit with a new role; night training for Wellington bomber crews.

By October 1944, Gamston was transferred to No. 7 Group RAF, Bomber Command. A month later No. 3 Aircrew School transferred from RAF Shepherds Grove.

1945 saw the disbanding of No. 3 Aircrew School and the arrival of No. 30 Operational Training Unit transferred from RAF Hixon, Staffordshire with more Wellington bombers. After the end of the Second World War all training ceased and the airfield was closed.

In May 1953 Gamston reopened as a satellite for nearby RAF Worksop and No. 211 Advanced Flying School RAF (later No. 4 Flying Training School) was based there, flying Gloster Meteors and de Havilland Vampires.

The airport is today owned and operated by Gamston Aviation Limited which purchased the operation in July 1993.

In 1975 gliding activities began on the western side of the airfield, using runway 15/33 (now 14/32). Gliding ran alongside powered flying activities for almost 20 years until the gliding club were asked to move away from the airfield in 2005, after safety concerns due to the proximity of powered flights to the gliders.

In 2021 the airport was bought by Thatcham Research, in order to carry out motor industry testing on the site. Thatcham said that aviation activities would continue at Gamston alongside the motor testing. In June 2022 the main runway 03/21 was closed in order to reduce the width of the runway, as well as create a car test track running parallel to the runway. During this construction phase, runway 14/32 was used as the main runway, having been repainted and put into regular use for the first time since the gliding club left in 2005. The main runway reopened in September 2022 as runway 02/20, with an upgraded lighting system. It has been reduced in length/width from 1683m x 30m to 1199m x 23m to accommodate the car test track.

== Motorsport ==
Gamston
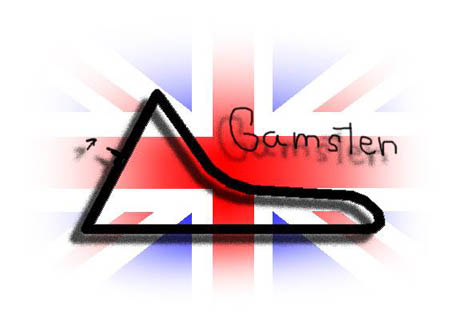
- Location: Nottinghamshire, England
- Opened: 1950
- Closed: 1951
- Website: http://www.retfordairport.co.uk
- Length: 2.0 mi (3.2 km)
- Race lap record: (David Hampshire, F1 Maserati 4CLT-48, 1950)

Between closing in 1945 and re-opening in 1953, some motor racing took place in 1950 and 1951, organised by the Nottinghamshire Sports Car Club. It would appear that motor racing first took place at Gamston on 7 August 1950 on a 2-mile track. Main event of this meeting was a non-championship Formula One race in its inaugural season, which was won by David Hampshire in a Maserati 4CLT-48. He also set the fastest lap at 74.4sec (96.77 mph). On 19 August 1950, Formula One made its second and last (non-championship) appearance for the 1st Sheffield Telegraph Trophy, which was won by Cuth Harrison driving an ERA. However, the following year, huge crowds attended meetings on Whit Monday (14 May 1951), and ‘Autosport’ of 27 July 1951 carried a report of a meeting run the previous weekend by the Sheffield & Hallamshire Motor Club. Reference was also made to improved amenities.

Proceedings opened with a couple of sport car races over five laps on a shorter 1.9 miles circuit. The first of which saw Colin Chapman winning in one of his Lotus. Main event of the day was the 50-lap Formula Libre race, won by Bob Gerard in his 2-litre ERA who led from flag to flag. His only opposition appears to have come from Dennis Poore's Alfa Romeo until it had plug troubles. Lap times were around 77secs, indicating a lap speed of close to 90 mph. For his efforts Gerard won the golden ’Kenning Trophy’.

Why racing ceased in 1951 is unclear but perhaps, there were strong rumours of the return of the Royal Air Force.

== Airlines and destinations ==
Airlines	Destinations
DEA	Diamond-Executive Aviation operates an on-demand air-taxi operation under EU-OPS AOC approval GB2339 using Diamond DA42 TwinStar aircraft
