= Ilkka Laitinen =

Finnish lieutenant general (1962–2019)

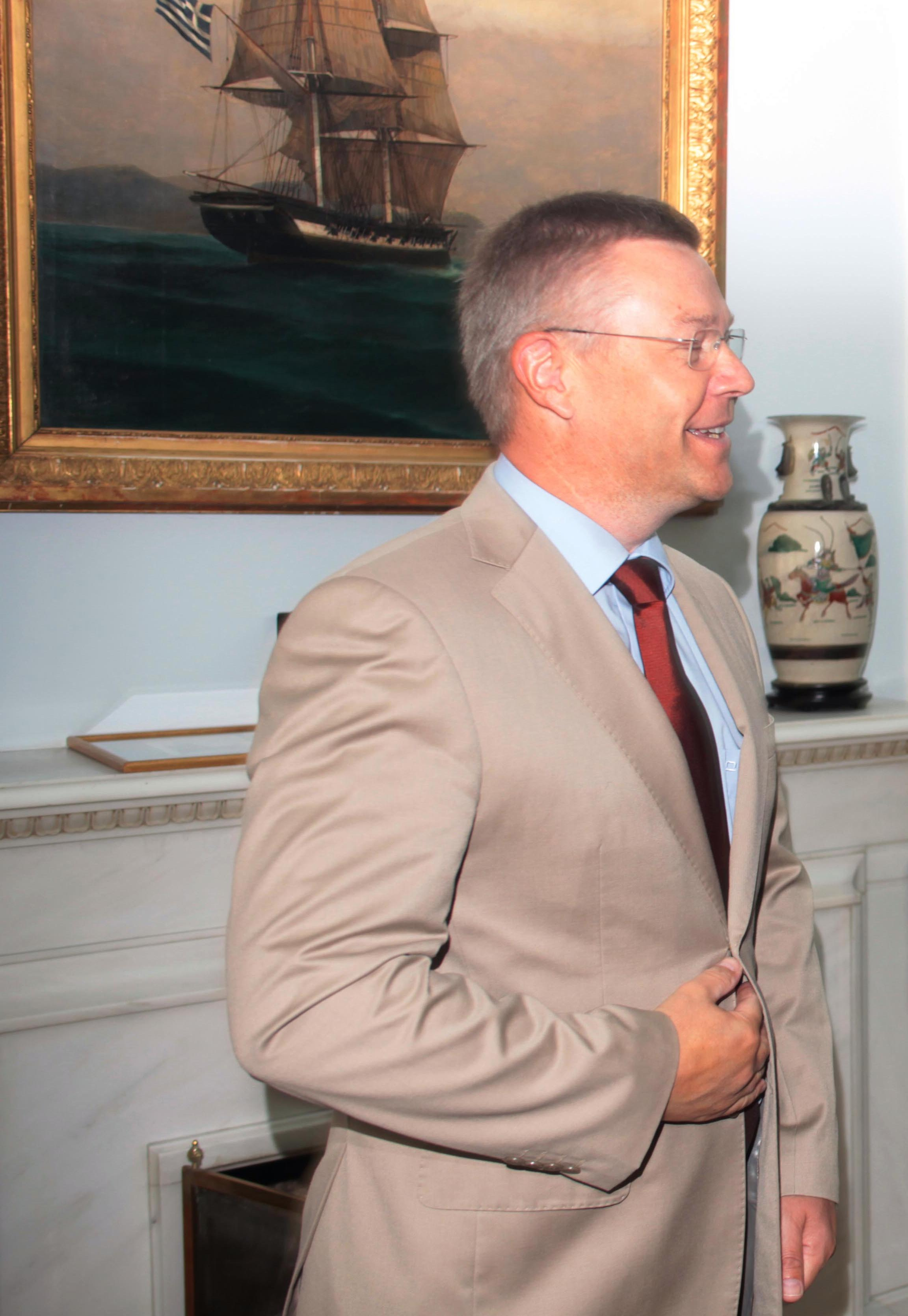
- Ilkka Laitinen 2008 in Athens
- Born: 22 August 1962; Nurmes, Finland
- Died: 29 September 2019 (aged 57)
- Military career
- Allegiance: Finland
- Branch: Finnish Border Guard
- Service years: 1982–2019
- Rank: Lieutenant general
- Other work: Executive Director of Frontex

Ilkka Pertti Juhani Laitinen (22 August 1962 – 29 September 2019) was a Finnish border guard officer, who served as the lieutenant general and the Chief of the Finnish Border Guard from 2018 to 2019. He was the first executive director of Frontex, the European Union’s border protection agency, from 2005 until 2014.

He served in the Finnish Border Guard in 1982 and since 1985. He rose to the rank of colonel in 2004 and held a wide variety of national and EU jobs. He was appointed as the first head of Frontex on 25 May 2005.

Laitinen retired from the Finnish Border Guard due to ill health on 31 August 2019. He died on 29 September 2019, aged 57, due to illness.

Government offices
Preceded by New organisation	Director of Frontex; May 2005 – January 2015	Succeeded by Fabrice Leggeri
