= European Border Surveillance System =

Surveillance system of the European Union

The European Border Surveillance System (commonly abbreviated Eurosur) is a surveillance system of the European Union (EU) that uses drones, reconnaissance aircraft, offshore sensors and satellite remote sensing, to track illegal immigration into the member states of the European Union. The program was put into effect by the European Parliament on October 10, 2013. On December 2, 2013, Eurosur was started in 18 EU member states and Norway.

Eurosur is primarily a program that allows exchange of information, that supports the cooperation of national immigration agencies. Its goal is to gain information about recent refugee movements and the activity of human trafficking organizations as quickly as possible.

The rescue of people in distress has also been adopted into the Eurosur regulation. Different aspects of the program are being criticized.

As of October 2013, 244 million Euros have been secured from the EU budget for the installation and maintenance of the system until 2020. Critics expect the costs of the project to surpass one billion Euros - other sources however mention expected costs of around 340 million Euros.

== See also ==
- European Border and Coast Guard
- Border barrier#Europe
