= Croatia–Montenegro border =

International border

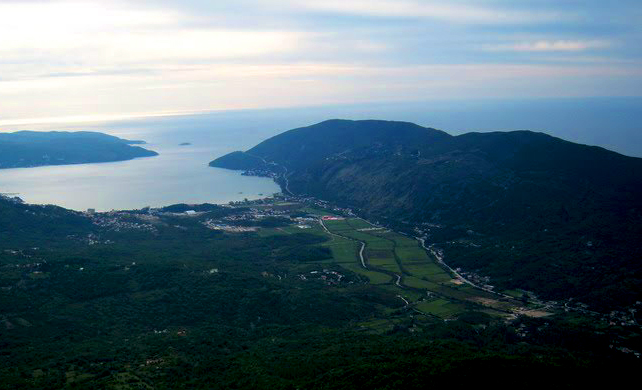
Igalo and Sutorina in Montenegro

The border between Croatia and Montenegro starts in the North at the tripoint with Bosnia and Herzegovina near Dubravka and continues southeastward until it reaches the entry to the Bay of Kotor at Cape Kobila. The border is only 19 km (12 mi) long. Other sources state that it is 25 km (16 mi) long.

The border was created during the existence of Yugoslavia in 1947 as a result of the Sutorina dispute between SR Bosnia-Herzegovina and the SR Montenegro. Prior to this agreement, the municipality of Sutorina was part of Bosnia-Herzegovina, meaning that Croatia and Montenegro had no land border.

The exact location of the border in the south near Prevlaka has been subject to several disputes in the aftermath of the Yugoslav Wars. A resolution to the conflict took shape in 1996 when the United Nations mediated the conflict and established an observer mission (UNMOP) which oversaw the demilitarization and acted as a buffer. The UN mission was terminated in 2002 and the Croatia and Federal Republic of Yugoslavia agreed on a temporary solution stipulating that the land border would revert to the inner-Yugoslav one. The exact border in the Bay of Kotor are still in dispute however. A part of the sea along the coast, close to the Montenegrin Igalo, was declared a neutral zone.

There are currently 2 functioning border crossings between the two countries. The main crossing one is located at Karasovići/Debeli Brijeg on European route E65, which an additional crossing was opened in 1999 at Kobila/Konfin.

== See also ==
- Croatia–Montenegro relations
