= DEA Aviation Limited =

UK aviation company

DEA Aviation Ltd.
IATA	ICAO	Call sign
-	WKT	WHITE KNIGHT
- Founded: 2006
- AOC #: GB2339
- Hubs: Retford Gamston Airport, Aeroporto di Padova
- Fleet size: 7
- Headquarters: Retford Gamston Airport
- Website: www.dea.aero

DEA Aviation Limited (DEA) is a small general aviation company based at Retford Gamston Airport in the United Kingdom.

It is a privately owned company operating mostly in the UK and Europe, undertaking intelligence, surveillance and reconnaissance (ISR), flight inspection, and flight path validation missions. In addition, the company carries out a very limited amount of charter work and the transport of small size dangerous goods.

DEA Aviation Limited operates its own aircraft maintenance facility and holds a Part M Subpart G with Airworthiness Review Certificates (ARC) privileges as well as a Part 145 Approval.

== History ==
Founded in 2006 by Peter Bondar and Chris Dawes, the company was granted its air operator's certificate (AOC) in 2009 and operations started with one Diamond DA42 aircraft. From 2009 onwards, more aircraft were acquired to fulfil contracts in Europe and Africa to service its customer base.

DEA attracted new investors in 2014. Peter Bondar retired, and a new team was recruited. In 2017 the company changed its name to "DEA Aviation Limited".

== Fleet ==
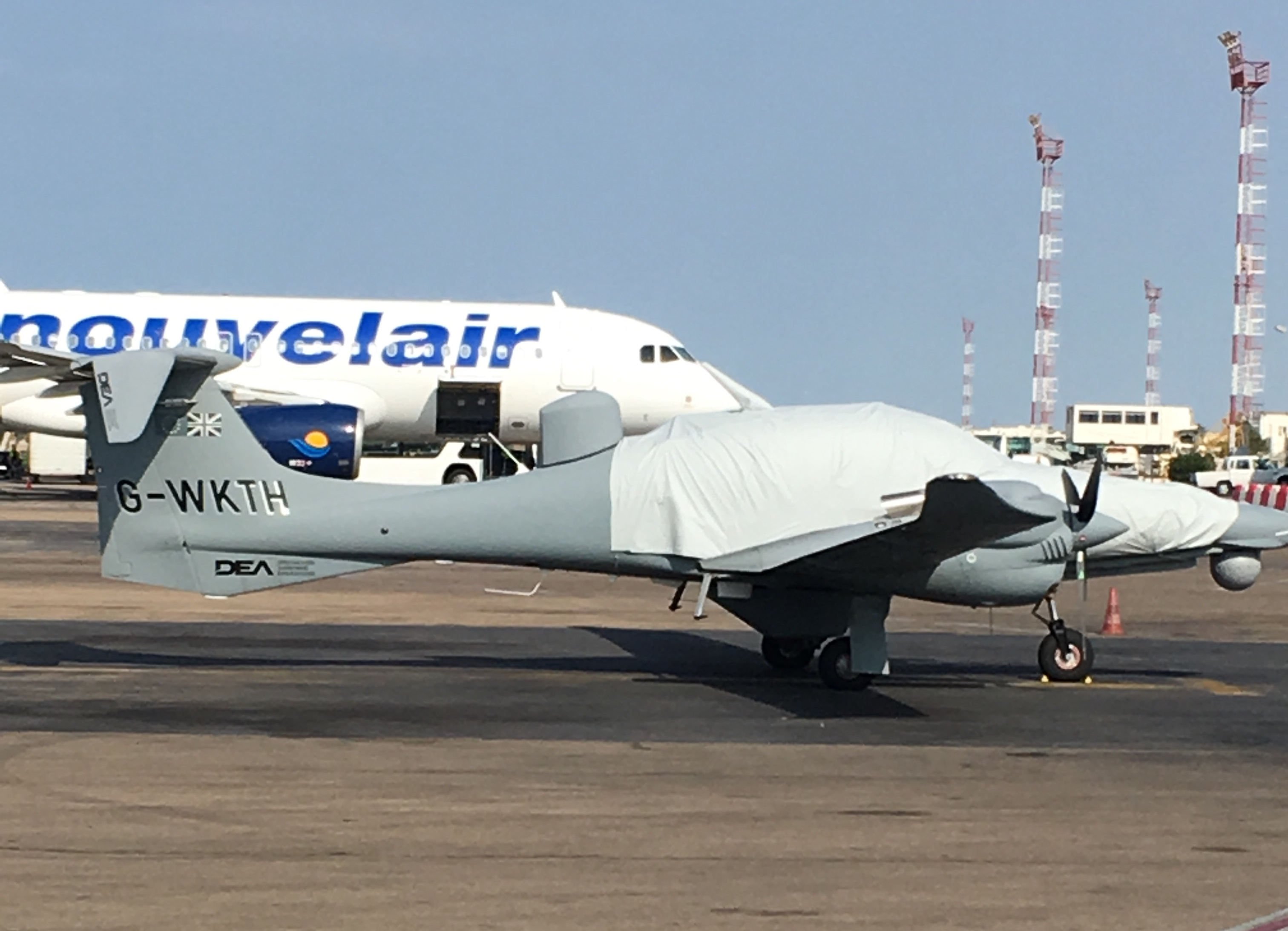
G-WKTH in Djerba–Zarzis International Airport, 2019.

DEA operates only a small number of Diamond DA42 and Diamond DA62 aircraft, all single pilot non-complex piston engine aircraft, in various configurations. The company also operates a few Beechcraft King Air aircraft, including E90, B200 and B350 variants.
