= Eastern Bulgaria =

Eastern Bulgaria may refer to:

- Eastern Bulgaria
- Volga Bulgaria
- Old Great Bulgaria
