= Belgian Coast Guard =

The Belgian Coast Guard is responsible for coordinating the operations of 17 government institutions and the province of West Flanders for the Belgian portion of the North Sea. Their area of responsibility covers 3,600 square kilometres (1,400 sq mi).
