= Fabrice Leggeri =

Former Director of the European Border and Coast Guard Agency

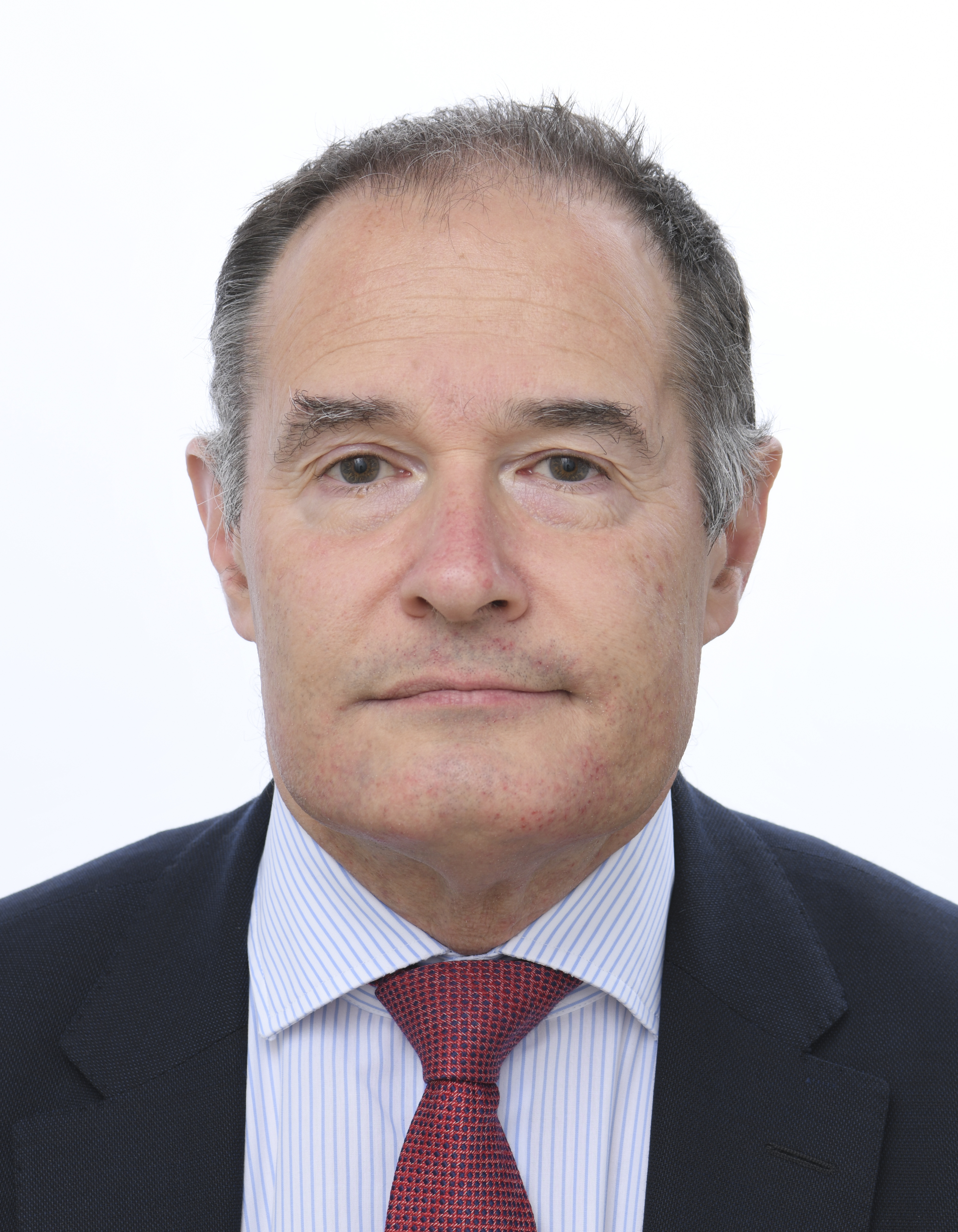

Member of the European Parliament (Note: 16th after two rounds of votes for one of 14 vice-presidents by the Bureau) for France
- Incumbent
- Assumed office 16 July 2024

Director of Frontex
- In office 16 January 2015 – 28 April 2022
- Preceded by: Ilkka Laitinen
- Succeeded by: Hans Leijtens

Personal details
- Born: Fabrice Joël Roger Leggeri; 28 March 1968 (age 58) Mulhouse, France
- Party: National Rally (2024–present)
- Education: École normale supérieure
- Occupation: Civil Servant • Politician

Fabrice Joël Roger Leggeri (born 28 March 1968) is a French senior civil servant who was Director of the European Border and Coast Guard Agency (Frontex) from 2015 to 2022.

In February 2024, Leggeri announced in an interview with Le Journal du Dimanche that he would be candidate number three on the National Rally list for the 2024 European Parliament election in France. He declared that he was determined to "combat the migratory overload, which the European Commission and Eurocrats do not consider as a problem, but rather as a project".

== Biography ==
Leggeri was born in Mullhouse.

He graduated in History (1990) and Contemporary History (1991) from the University of Paris. In 1992 he got a diploma at Sciences Po. He graduated from the École normale supérieure in 1993 and from École nationale d'administration (ENA) in Strasbourg in 1996.

From 1996 to 1999, he worked in France's Ministry of the Interior on cross-border traffic, frontiers and visas. The following year he was project leader to the director for territorial, administration and political affairs at the French Ministry of Interior From 2000 to 2003, he was seconded to the European Commission as a national expert.

As vice-prefect in two French regions (Upper Normandy in 2003–2005, Châteaulin District in 2005–2007), Leggeri coordinated police forces and law enforcement agencies and setting up operational action plans to maintain public order and security.

From 2007 he headed the division for international and European law at the French Ministry of Defence. In 2001 he moved to Seoul to serve as deputy head of the French Embassy in South Korea.

Between 2013 and 2014, he headed the division for the fight against irregular migration at the French Ministry of Interior, also in charge of Schengen.

=== Executive Director of Frontex ===
In 2015 Leggeri was appointed Executive Director of the EU's Frontex agency, based in Warsaw.

In May 2015, the European Ombudsman issued recommendations for Frontex to improve its modalities to ensures respect for the fundamental rights and human dignity of the individuals being returned. The Ombudsman highlighted the need for Frontex to improve transparency, amend its code of conduct and promote independent and effective monitoring of joint return operations.

Under Leggeri's mandate, Frontex saw an exponential increase in its mandate, staffing (doubling to 500) and resources, as the new European Border and Coast Guard Agency, with the entry into force of the new Regulation 2019/1896.

At the same time, the Agency was subject of multiple and growing critiques due to the lack of a systematic monitoring of human rights compliance in its work, and the growing reports of illegal pushbacks conducted by EU Member States' coast guards and border police, with the alleged knowledge or complicity of Frontex.

In July 2020, Leggeri appeared in front of the European Parliament's civil liberties committee, claiming that only one incident of pushback had been reported to his Agency.

In October 2020, the European Ombudsman opened an inquiry into about Frontex's handling of requests for public access to documents, following multiple complaints. Documents released by Frontex are only accessible for 15 days on the Agency's own portal and are claimed to remain under the Agency's copyright.

In October 2020, MEPs from The Left group in the European Parliament called for his resignation following journalistic investigations highlighting the role of Frontex in the pushback of asylum seekers towards Turkey. The Agency's investment of 100 million EUR in surveillance drones was also put under scrutiny. European Commissioner Ylva Johansson requested an investigation on the pushback reports and called for an extraordinary meeting of the Frontex management board on 10 November. The replies of Frontex to the commission were later published by Greek media Efsyn.

On 1 December Leggeri appeared in front of the European Parliament to respond of accusations of involvement of Frontex in pushbacks. MEPs from The Left group asked again for his resignation.

=== Misleading the European Parliament and unregistered meetings with lobbyists ===
In February 2021, under Leggeri's leadership, Frontex was accused of its staff meeting "with scores of unregistered lobbyists that represent the weapons, surveillance and biometrics industries". The investigation also indicated that Frontex misled the European Parliament. In 2018, Leggeri told MEPs in response to a question: “Frontex only met with registered lobbyists who are registered in the EU Transparency Register … no meetings were held in 2017.” But according to the documents obtained, Frontex “held at least four meetings with industry” that year, CEO wrote. “Of the 24 private bodies that participated in these meetings – mostly companies – over half (58 percent or 14 bodies) were not registered in the EU Transparency Register.” Overall, their research found that from 2017 to 2019, Frontex met with 138 private groups: 108 companies, 10 research centers or think tanks, 15 universities and one non-governmental organization. Human rights organizations were notably absent.

=== 2021 "Hiring Chaos" and the Frontex “Potemkin Corps” ===
In early 2021, reports emerged in the media of serious recruitment and HR issues at Frontex. At least one report spoke of a “comically incompetent” HR department at the agency. In video press briefing on 28 January 2021 European Commissioner for Home Affairs Ylva Johansson, said "We are counting on a functioning and robust Frontex. It is fundamental: we have a new regulation in force for Frontex since December 2019 and we see that many things that should be there are not there yet...For example, there should be three deputy executive directors and there isn't even one; we should have a fundamental rights officer and there is only a provisional one; we should have 40 fundamental rights observers, we have zero. There is a lot of work to be done to have a robust and functioning Frontex. There is a huge responsibility that falls on the general manager (Fabrice Leggeri) and the management committee. I expect them to focus on addressing these issues". Reported problems at Frontex included first-person accounts of offers for the Standing Corps being made and then withdrawn the following day; recruits being brought to Poland for training only to be told they had failed a medical test the previous month and then abandoned; inadequate provisions made for COVID protection during training; and nonexistent communication with new staff about key practical issues. These issues, combined with the fact that the Standing Corps cannot be armed under current regulations because the agency's new 2019 mandate did not include the necessary legal basis under which it can acquire, register, store and transport firearms, have led some to refer to the Standing Corps internally as a “Potemkin Corps”, i.e. something for show only.

=== Allegations of "harassment, misconduct and migrant pushbacks" ===
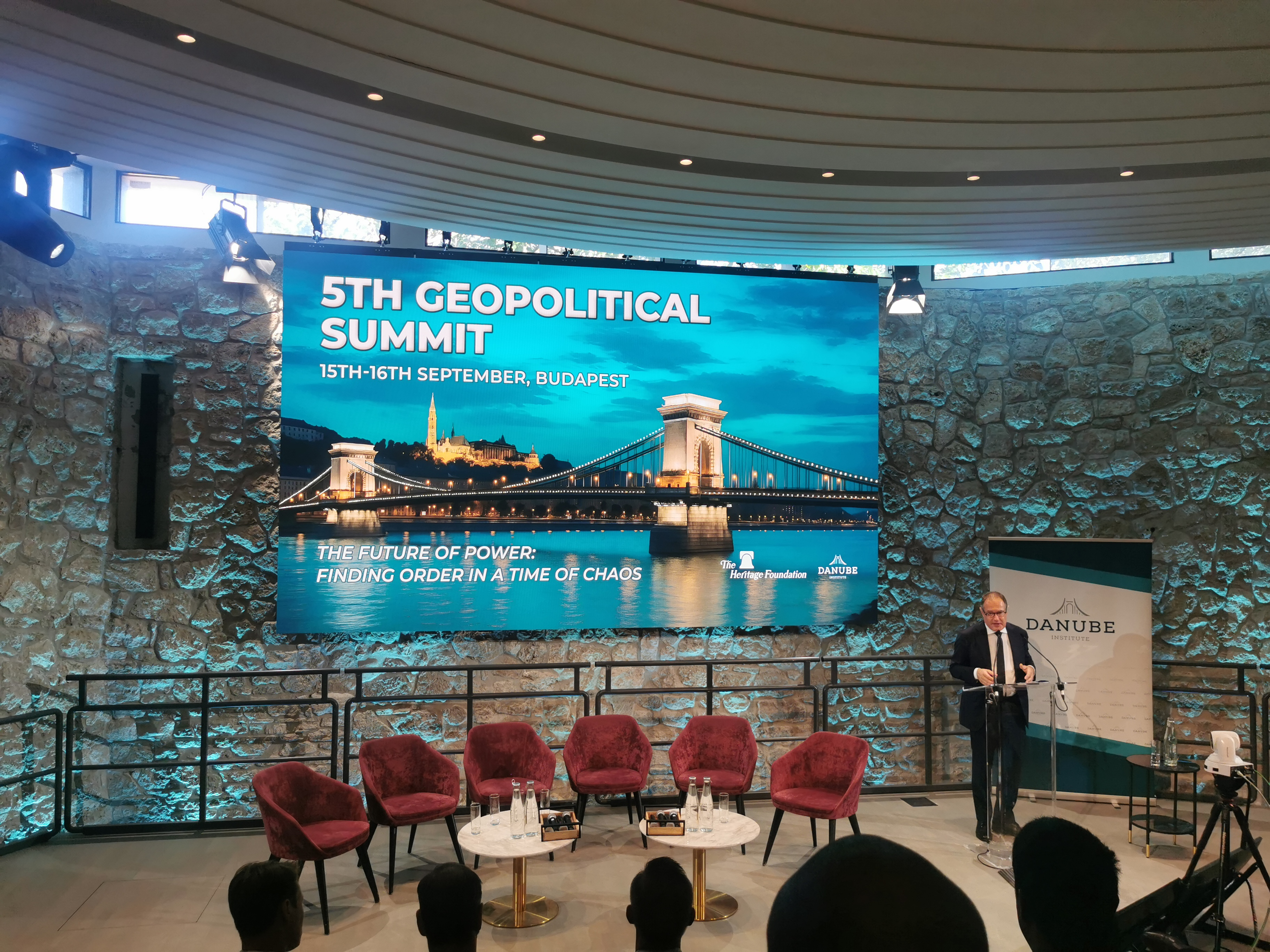
Fabrice Leggeri speaking at Geopolitical Summit Budapest 2025

On 7 December 2020, the EU's anti-fraud watchdog, OLAF, raided the offices of Frontex Executive Director Fabrice Leggeri, as well as his head of Cabinet Thibauld de La Haye Jousselin as part of an investigation into allegations of "harassment, misconduct and migrant pushbacks". According to an internal document seen by the Greek Newspaper Ekathimerini, Leggeri “actively resisted” the recruitment of the required 40 fundamental rights officers provided for in the regulation of the new European Border and Coast Guard Agency, answering frequent questions from agency staff in early 2020 that “it is not a priority.” The author also accuses Leggeri of being in charge of a “comically incompetent” human resources department.

There were many cases of sexual harassment within the Agency, and notably the suicide of a staff member, “related to alleged practices of sexual harassment”; in total 17 cases of sexual harassment in the agency were reported in 2020, of which 15 were closed without follow-up.

Leggeri complained about the lack of a warrant for the OLAF action in 2020.

== Note and references ==
Government offices
Preceded by Ilkka Laitinen	Director of Frontex; January 2015 – April 2022	Succeeded by Aija Kalnaja (acting)
