= Kübekháza =

- Village
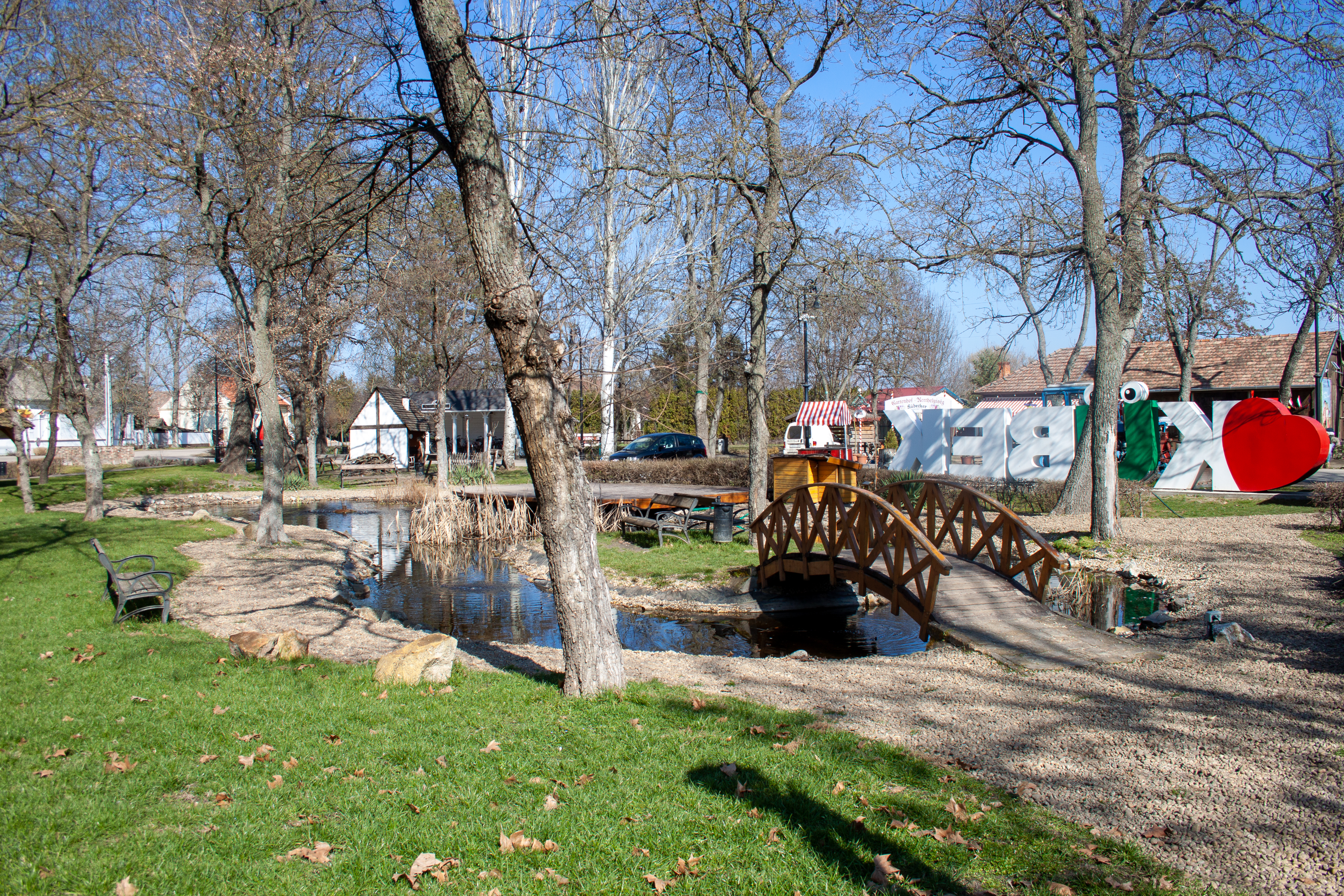
- Petőfi square in Kübekháza

- Coat of arms

- Location of Kübekháza in Hungary
- Coordinates: 46.15°N 20.28°E
- Country: Hungary
- Region: Southern Great Plain
- County: Csongrád
- Subregion: Szegedi
- Rank: Village

Area
  - Total: 27.31 km^{2} (10.54 sq mi)

Population (2020)
  - Total: 1,418
  - Density: 51.92/km^{2} (134.5/sq mi)
- Time zone: UTC+1 (CET)
  - Summer (DST): UTC+2 (CEST)
- Postal code: 6755
- Area code: +36 62
- KSH code: 14410
- Website: www.kubekhaza.hu

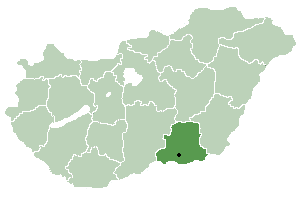
Csongrád County in Hungary

Kübekháza (German: Kübeckhausen) is a settlement (village) in Csongrád-Csanád County, in Hungary. It is situated directly near the Romanian-Serbian-Hungarian triple border point, also known as the Triplex Confinium. A border crossing to Serbia opened in October 2019, ending the century of isolation of the neighbouring Serbian village of Rabe. The village has an area of 27.31 km^{2} (10.54 sq mi) and 1418 inhabitants.

== History ==
Kübekháza was founded in 1844 by the settlement of tobacco farmers. Starting in the 1850s, increasing numbers of impoverished Hungarian farmers left the village, and were replaced by Banat Swabians.

By the start of the Second World War around 20% of the village's population was German. Many Swabians fled the village before the advance of the Red Army, since the majority of male Swabian villagers were SS-volunteers. The remaining Germans were forcibly expelled in the following years, and in 2020 the town's German population was less than 0.8%. However, the village still honours its German heritage with street signs and boards that displaying information in German alongside Hungarian.

The village was named after the Austrian statesman Karl Friedrich von Kübeck (Hungarian: Kübeck Károly Frigyes). Kübeck did not take direct action in the foundation of the settlement and likely never visited Kübekháza.

== Culture ==
The settlement is sometimes called operetta-village because of the operetta-festival held with famous participants every summer.
