= Bulgaria–Serbia border =

Border between Bulgaria and Serbia

The Bulgaria–Serbia border separates Bulgaria and Serbia in Southeast Europe. It has a length of 341 km (212 mi), of which 315 is on land. The border starts in the north from the tripoint with Romania at the confluence of the Timok and Danube rivers. It then continues southward, first along the Timok river, then continues south until it reaches the tripoint with North Macedonia near Zheravino.

== Border crossings ==
There are currently five functioning border crossings between the two countries. The following is a table of the crossing points, listed from north to south:

(Bulgaria) Bulgarian checkpoint	Province	(Serbia) Serbian checkpoint	District	Route in Bulgaria	Route in Serbia	Status
Bregovo	Vidin	Mokranje	Bor			Open
Vrashka Chuka	Sofia	Vrashka Chuka	Zaječar			Open
Kalotina	Sofia	Gradina	Pirot			Open
Strezimirovci	Pernik	Strezimirovci	Pčinja			Open
Oltomantsi	Kyustendil	Ribarci	Pčinja	N-601	M-231	Open
