= Bulgaria–North Macedonia border =

Border between Bulgaria and North Macedonia

The Bulgaria–North Macedonia border separates Bulgaria and the Republic of North Macedonia in Southeast Europe. It has a length of 156 km (97 mi). It was marked with the Treaty of Bucharest on 10 August 1913. The border starts in the North from the tripoint with Serbia. It then continues southward generally following the watershed between the Struma and Vardar rivers up to the tripoint with Greece on the Tumba Peak.

== Border crossings ==
There are currently three functioning border crossings between the two countries, with the opening of a fourth planned. The following is a table of the crossing points, listed from North to South:

(Bulgaria) Bulgarian checkpoint	Province	(North Macedonia) North Macedonian checkpoint	Municipality	Route in Bulgaria	Route in North Macedonia	Status
Gyueshevo	Kyustendil	Deve Bair	Kriva Palanka			Open
Logodazh	Blagoevgrad	Delčevo	Delčevo	N-106		Open
Strumyani	Blagoevgrad	Klepalo	Berovo	local road	local road	CLOSED
Zlatarevo	Blagoevgrad	Novo Selo	Novo Selo	N-198		Open

== See also ==
- North Macedonia border barrier
