= Rabe (Novi Kneževac) =

Rabe Рабе (Serbian) Rábé (Hungarian)
- Village (Selo)
- Location of Vojvoda Zimonić within Serbia Rabe (Serbia) Rabe (Europe)
- Coordinates: 46°06′00″N 20°15′12″E
- Country: Serbia
- Province: Vojvodina
- District: North Banat
- Municipalities: Novi Kneževac

Population (2022)
  - Rabe: 62
- Time zone: UTC+1 (CET)
  - Summer (DST): UTC+2 (CEST)
- Area code: +381(0)230
- Car plates: KI

Rabe (Serbian Cyrillic: Рабе, Hungarian: Rábé, Romanian: Rabe) is a village in Serbia. It is situated in the Novi Kneževac municipality, in the North Banat District, Vojvodina province. The village has population of 62 according to the 2022 census, a 54% decrease from the 2002 census, which recorded a population of 135.

A border crossing to Hungary opened in October 2019, ending the village's century isolation and renewing the traditional ties with the Hungarian village of Kübekháza.

== See also ==
- List of places in Serbia
- List of cities, towns and villages in Vojvodina
