= Bureau of the European Parliament =

Administration bureau

The Bureau of the European Parliament is responsible for matters relating to the budget, administration, organisation and staff in the European Parliament. It is composed of the President of the European Parliament along with all 14 Vice-Presidents and the five Quaestors (in a consultative capacity). They are elected for two and a half years (renewable term) with the President holding a casting vote. Elections are usually held at the start, and at the midpoint, of each Parliamentary term.

== Members ==
=== 2024-2027 ===
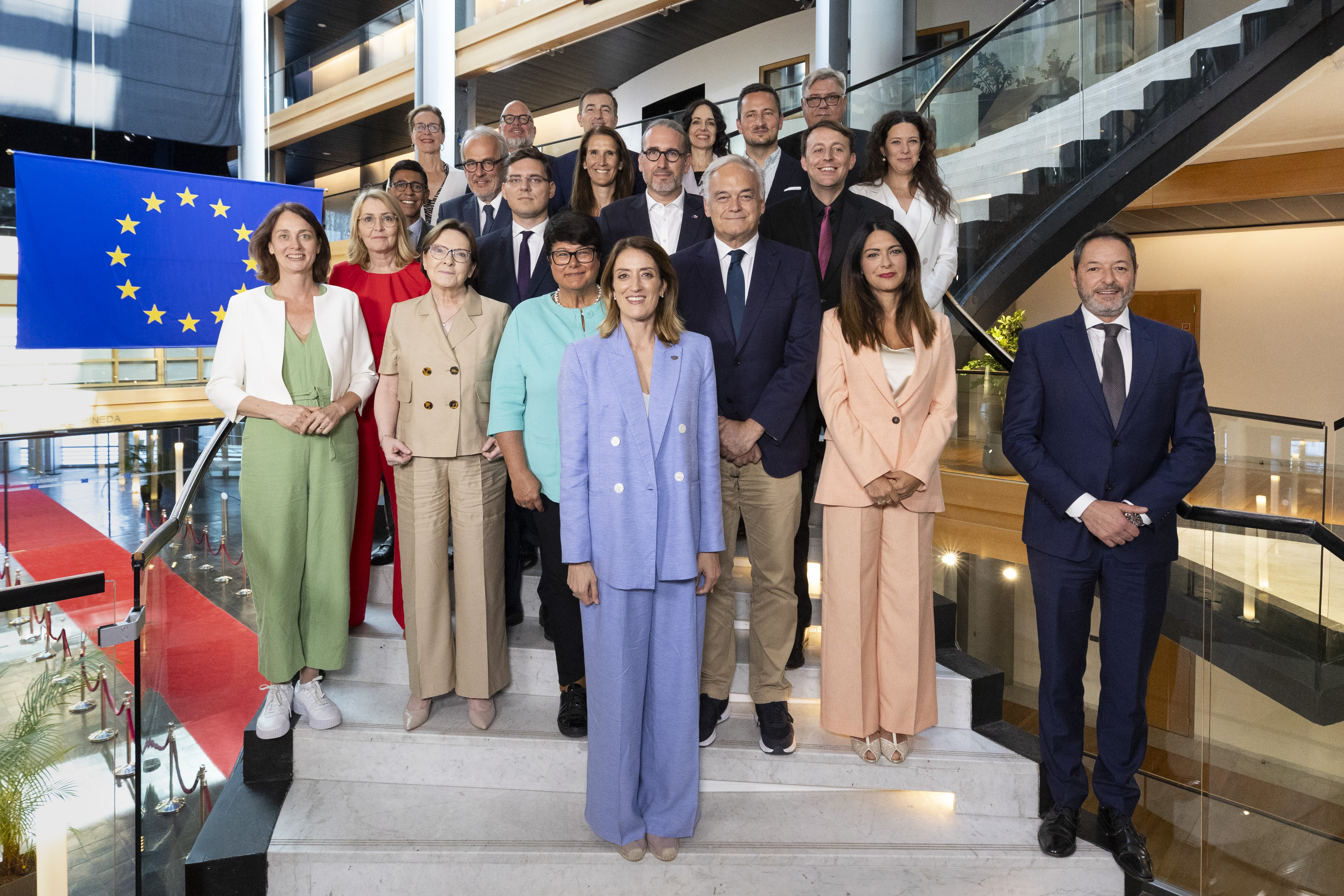
Bureau of the European Parliament (2024-2027)

| President | EPP | Roberta Metsola | MLT |
| Vice Presidents | EPP | Sabine Verheyen | GER |
| Vice Presidents | EPP | Ewa Kopacz | POL |
| Vice Presidents | EPP | Esteban González Pons | SPA |
| Vice Presidents | S&D | Katarina Barley | GER |
| Vice Presidents | S&D | Pina Picierno | ITA |
| Vice Presidents | S&D | Victor Negrescu | ROM |
| Vice Presidents | RE | Martin Hojsík | SVK |
| Vice Presidents | S&D | Christel Schaldemose | DEN |
| Vice Presidents | S&D | Javi López | SPA |
| Vice Presidents | RE | Sophie Wilmès | BEL |
| Vice Presidents | G/EFA | Nicolae Ștefănuță | ROM |
| Vice Presidents | ECR | Roberts Zīle | LAT |
| Vice Presidents | ECR | Antonella Sberna | ITA |
| Vice Presidents | LEFT | Younous Omarjee | FRA |
| Quaestors | EPP | Andrey Kovatchev | BGR |
| Quaestors | S&D | Marc Angel | LUX |
| Quaestors | EPP | Miriam Lexmann | SVK |
| Quaestors | RE | Fabienne Keller | FRA |
| Quaestors | ECR | Kosma Złotowski | POL |

=== 2022-2024 ===
| President | EPP | Roberta Metsola | MLT |
| Vice Presidents | EPP | Othmar Karas | AUT |
| Vice Presidents | EPP | Ewa Kopacz | POL |
| Vice Presidents | EPP | Rainer Wieland | GER |
| Vice Presidents | S&D | Pina Picierno | ITA |
| Vice Presidents | S&D | Pedro Silva Pereira | POR |
| Vice Presidents | S&D | Eva Kaili | GRE |
| Vice Presidents | S&D | Evelyn Regner | AUT |
| Vice Presidents | S&D | Katarina Barley | GER |
| Vice Presidents | RE | Dita Charanzová | CZE |
| Vice Presidents | RE | Michal Šimečka | SVK |
| Vice Presidents | RE | Nicola Beer | GER |
| Vice Presidents | ECR | Roberts Zīle | LAT |
| Vice Presidents | GUE/NGL | Dimitrios Papadimoulis | GRE |
| Vice Presidents | G/EFA | Heidi Hautala | FIN |
| Quaestors | EPP | Anne Sander | FRA |
| Quaestors | EPP | Christophe Hansen | LUX |
| Quaestors | S&D | Monika Beňová | SVK |
| Quaestors | RE | Fabienne Keller | FRA |
| Quaestors | G/EFA | Marcel Kolaja | CZE |

=== 2019-2022 ===
| President | S&D | David Sassoli | ITA |
| Vice-Presidents | EPP | Mairead McGuinness | IRL |
| Vice-Presidents | EPP | Rainer Wieland | GER |
| Vice-Presidents | EPP | Othmar Karas | AUT |
| Vice-Presidents | EPP | Ewa Kopacz | POL |
| Vice-Presidents | EPP | Lívia Járóka | HUN |
| Vice-Presidents | S&D | Pedro Silva Pereira | POR |
| Vice-Presidents | S&D | Katarina Barley | GER |
| Vice-Presidents | S&D | Klára Dobrev | HUN |
| Vice-Presidents | RE | Dita Charanzová | CZE |
| Vice-Presidents | RE | Nicola Beer | GER |
| Vice-Presidents | G/EFA | Heidi Hautala | FIN |
| Vice-Presidents | G/EFA | Marcel Kolaja | CZE |
| Vice-Presidents | GUE/NGL | Dimitrios Papadimoulis | GRE |
| Vice-Presidents | NI | Fabio Massimo Castaldo | ITA |
| Quaestors | EPP | Anne Sander | FRA |
| Quaestors | EPP | David Casa | MLT |
| Quaestors | S&D | Monika Beňová | SVK |
| Quaestors | RE | Gilles Boyer | FRA |
| Quaestors | ECR | Karol Karski | POL |

=== 2009-2012 ===
| Member | Position | Political group | Constituency |
|---|---|---|---|
| Jerzy Buzek | President | European People's Party | Silesian (Poland) |
| Giovanni Pittella | Vice President | Socialists & Democrats | Southern Italy |
| Rodi Kratsa-Tsagaropoulou | Vice President | European People's Party | Greece |
| Anni Podimata | Vice President | Socialists & Democrats | Greece |
| Miguel Angel Martínez Martínez | Vice President | Socialists & Democrats | Spain |
| Alejo Vidal-Quadras Roca | Vice President | European People's Party | Spain |
| Dagmar Roth-Behrendt | Vice President | Socialists & Democrats | Germany |
| Libor Rouček | Vice President | Socialists & Democrats | Czech Republic |
| Isabelle Durant | Vice President | Green-EFA | French-speaking Belgium |
| Roberta Angelilli | Vice President | European People's Party | Central Italy |
| Diana Wallis | Vice President | Alliance of Liberals and Democrats for Europe | Yorkshire and the Humber (UK) |
| László Tőkés | Vice President | European People's Party | Romania |
| Edward McMillan-Scott | Vice President | Alliance of Liberals and Democrats for Europe | Yorkshire and the Humber (UK) |
| Rainer Wieland | Vice President | European People's Party | Germany |
| Giles Chichester | Vice President | European Conservatives and Reformists | South West England (UK) |
| Lidia Geringer de Oedenberg | Quaestor | Socialists & Democrats | Lower Silesian and Opole (Poland) |
| Jim Higgins | Quaestor | European People's Party | North-West Ireland |
| Astrid Lulling | Quaestor | European People's Party | Luxembourg |
| Jiří Maštálka | Quaestor | European United Left–Nordic Green Left | Czech Republic |
| Bill Newton Dunn | Quaestor | Alliance of Liberals and Democrats for Europe | East Midlands (UK) |

==== Resigned ====
- Pál Schmitt, Vice President, EPP, Hungary - became President of the Republic of Hungary on 6 August 2010

replaced by Tőkés (Romania)

- Silvana Koch-Mehrin, Vice President, ALDE, Germany - resigned over doctoral thesis plagiarism affair on 11 May 2011

replaced by Chichester (South West England)

- Stavros Lambrinidis, Vice President, S & D, Greece - became Minister for Foreign Affairs of Greece on 17 June 2011

replaced by Podimata (Greece)

=== 2007-2009 ===
- Hans-Gert Pöttering: President
- Rodi Kratsa-Tsagaropoulou: Vice-President
- Alejo Vidal-Quadras Roca: Vice-President
- Gérard Onesta: Vice-President
- Edward McMillan-Scott: Vice-President
- Mario Mauro: Vice-President
- Miguel Angel Martínez Martínez: Vice-President
- Luigi Cocilovo: Vice-President
- Mechtild Rothe: Vice-President
- Luisa Morgantini: Vice-President
- Pierre Moscovici: Vice-President
- Manuel António dos Santos: Vice-President
- Diana Wallis: Vice-President
- Marek Siwiec: Vice-President
- Adam Bielan: Vice-President
- James Nicholson: Quaestor
- Astrid Lulling: Quaestor
- Mia De Vits: Quaestor
- Ingo Friedrich: Quaestor
- Szabolcs Fazakas: Quaestor
- Jan Mulder: Quaestor

== Rules of procedure of the European Parliament ==
Rule 22 : Duties of the Bureau

1. The Bureau shall carry out the duties assigned to it under the Rules of Procedure.

2. The Bureau shall take financial, organisational and administrative decisions on matters concerning Members and the internal organisation of Parliament, its Secretariat and its bodies.

3. The Bureau shall take decisions on matters relating to the conduct of sittings.

4. The Bureau shall adopt the provisions referred to in Rule 31 concerning Non-attached Members.

5. The Bureau shall decide the establishment plan of the Secretariat and lay down regulations relating to the administrative and financial situation of officials and other servants.

6. The Bureau shall draw up Parliament's preliminary draft estimates.

7. The Bureau shall adopt the guidelines for the Quaestors pursuant to Rule 25.

8. The Bureau shall be the authority responsible for authorising meetings of committees away from the usual places of work, hearings and study and fact-finding journeys by rapporteurs.

Where such meetings are authorised, the language arrangements shall be determined on the basis of the official languages used and requested by the members and substitutes of the committee concerned.

The same shall apply in the case of the delegations, except where the members and substitutes concerned agree otherwise.

9. The Bureau shall appoint the Secretary-General pursuant to Rule 197.

10. The Bureau shall lay down the implementing rules relating to European Parliament and Council Regulation (EC) No 2004/2003 on the regulations governing political parties at European level and the rules regarding their funding and shall, in implementing that Regulation, assume the tasks conferred upon it by these Rules of Procedure.

11. The President and/or the Bureau may entrust one or more members of the Bureau with general or specific tasks lying within the competence of the President and/or the Bureau. At the same time the ways and means of carrying them out shall be laid down.

12. When a new Parliament is elected, the outgoing Bureau shall remain in office until the first sitting of the new Parliament.
