= Quaestor (European Parliament) =

Officials of the European Parliament

In the European Parliament, the quaestors are elected to oversee administrative and financial matters directly affecting members (MEPs) as well as other duties assigned to them by the Parliament's Rules of Procedure or the Bureau of the European Parliament. Five quaestors are elected among the MEPs for two and a half year-terms, i.e. half a parliamentary term.

== Election ==
Quaestors are elected after the President and Vice-Presidents of the European Parliament. Rule 18 of the Rules of Procedure dictates that quaestors are elected by the same procedure as the Vice-Presidents, meaning that one or more single ballots are held until all five seats have been filled via either absolute majority (first two ballots) or relative majority (3rd ballot). If the number of candidates does not exceed five, the quaestors are elected by acclamation unless a ballot is requested by members or one or more political groups totaling at least one-fifth of the members.

== List of quaestors ==
=== 9th Parliament (2019–2024) ===
Name	Country	National party	EP Group
Quaestors serving from 2022 to 2024
Anne Sander	France	Les Républicains	EPP
Christophe Hansen	Luxembourg	Christian Social People's Party	EPP
Monika Beňová	Slovakia	SMER-SD	S&D
Fabienne Keller	France	Agir	RE
Marcel Kolaja	Czech Republic	Czech Pirate Party	Greens/EFA
Quaestors serving from 2019 to 2022
Anne Sander	France	Les Républicains	EPP
David Casa	Malta	Partit Nazzjonalista	EPP
Monika Beňová	Slovakia	SMER-SD	S&D
Gilles Boyer	France	None	RE
Karol Karski	Poland	Law and Justice	ECR

=== 8th Parliament (2014–2019) ===
Name	Country	National party	EP Group
Quaestors serving from 2017 to 2019
Élisabeth Morin-Chartier	France	Union for a Popular Movement	EPP
Andrey Kovatchev	Bulgaria	Citizens for European Development of Bulgaria	EPP
Catherine Bearder	United Kingdom	Liberal Democrats	ALDE
Vladimír Maňka	Slovakia	SMER-SD	S&D
Karol Karski	Poland	Law and Justice	ECR
Quaestors serving from 2014 to 2017
Élisabeth Morin-Chartier	France	Union for a Popular Movement	EPP
Bogusław Liberadzki	Poland	Democratic Left Alliance	S&D
Catherine Bearder	United Kingdom	Liberal Democrats	ALDE
Andrey Kovatchev	Bulgaria	GERB	EPP
Karol Adam Karski	Poland	Law and Justice	ECR

=== 7th Parliament (2009–2014) ===
Name	Country	National party	EP Group
Quaestors serving from 2012 to 2014
Astrid Lulling	Luxembourg	Christian Social People's Party	EPP
Jim Higgins	Ireland	Fine Gael	EPP
Lidia Geringer de Oedenberg	Poland	Democratic Left Alliance	S&D
Bogusław Liberadzki	Poland	Democratic Left Alliance - Labour Union	S&D
Jiří Maštálka	Czech Republic	Communist Party of Bohemia and Moravia	GUE/NGL
Quaestors serving from 2009 to 2012
Lidia Geringer de Oedenberg	Poland	Democratic Left Alliance	S&D
Jim Higgins	Ireland	Fine Gael	EPP
Astrid Lulling	Luxembourg	Christian Social People's Party	EPP
Jiří Maštálka	Czech Republic	Communist Party of Bohemia and Moravia	GUE/NGL
Bill Newton Dunn	United Kingdom	Liberal Democrats	ALDE

=== 6th Parliament (2004–2009) ===
Name	Country	National party	EP Group
Quaestors serving from 2007 to 2009
James Nicholson	United Kingdom	Ulster Unionist Party	EPP
Astrid Lulling	Luxembourg	Christian Social People's Party	EPP
Mia De Vits	Belgium	Socialist Party Differently	S&D
Ingo Friedrich	Germany	Christian Social Union	EPP
Szabolcs Fazakas	Hungary	Hungarian Socialist Party	S&D
Jan Mulder	Netherlands	People's Party for Freedom and Democracy	ALDE
Quaestors serving from 2004 to 2007
James Nicholson	United Kingdom	Ulster Unionist Party	EPP
Genowefa Grabowska	Poland	Social Democracy of Poland	S&D
Mia De Vits	Belgium	Socialist Party Differently	S&D
Godelieve Quisthoudt-Rowohl	Germany	Christian Democratic Union	EPP
Astrid Lulling	Luxembourg	Christian Social People's Party	EPP
