= Seventh European Parliament =

Session of the European Parliament from 2009 to 2014

7th European Parliament
- 14 July 2009 – 17 April 2014
- President (1st Half): Jerzy Buzek
- President (2nd Half): Martin Schulz
- Commission: Barroso
- Political groups: EPP; S&D; ALDE; Greens/EFA; ECR; GUE-NGL; EFD; NI
- MEPs: 736 (754 from 1 December 2011)
- Elections: June 2009 (Union); April 2013 (Croatia)
- Nice (Note: The Treaties of Rome and Treaty of Maastricht as amended by the Treaty of Nice and all preceding amending treaties.); Treaty of Lisbon (Note: The Treaties of Rome and Treaty of Maastricht as amended by the Treaty of Lisbon and all preceding amending treaties.)

The seventh European Parliament was elected in the 2009 elections and lasted until the 2014 elections.

== Major events ==
Group	Leader(s)	MEPs	
EPP	Joseph Daul	274	
S&D	Hannes Swoboda	195	
ALDE	Guy Verhofstadt	85	
Greens-EFA	Daniel Cohn-Bendit; Rebecca Harms	58	
ECR	Martin Callanan	56	
GUE-NGL	Gabi Zimmer	35	
EFD	Nigel Farage; Francesco Speroni	33	
Non-Inscrits	MEPs without group	30	Source: European Parliament

- 4–7 June 2009
  - Elections to the Seventh Parliament.
- 14 July 2009
  - First meeting (constitutive session) of the Seventh Parliament.
  - Jerzy Buzek is elected as President of the European Parliament.
  - Vice-presidents elections.
- 17 January 2012
  - Martin Schulz is elected as President of the European Parliament.

== Activity ==
	2009	2010	2011	2012	2013	2014	Source
Reports							
Resolutions and positions							
Parliamentary questions							
Written declarations							

== Major resolutions and positions ==
Resolution/position number	Procedure number	Notes

== Committees ==
=== Summary ===
Type	Number	Sources	Notes
Standing committee			
Temporary committee			
Committee of enquiry			

=== Temporary committees ===
Code	Committee	Report	Sources

=== Committees of enquiry ===
Code	Committee	Report	Sources

== Delegations ==
Type	Number	Sources
Europe delegations		
Non-Europe delegations		
Ad hoc delegations		

== Political groups ==
See membership below for details of size

Group name	Acronym	Seats	Percent	Chairs	Vice-presidents
European People's Party	EPP	265	36%	(France) Joseph Daul	5
Progressive Alliance of Socialists and Democrats	S&D	184	25%	(Germany) Martin Schulz	5
Alliance of Liberals and Democrats for Europe Group	ALDE	84	11.4%	(Belgium) Guy Verhofstadt	2
The Greens–European Free Alliance	GREENS/EFA	55	7.5%	(Germany) Rebecca Harms (France) Daniel Cohn-Bendit	1
European Conservatives and Reformists	ECR	54	7.3%	(Poland) Michał Kamiński	0 (Note: Edward MacMillan-Scott, standing in opposition to the policy of the ECR and his national party, the Conservatives, was expelled from the group.)
European United Left–Nordic Green Left	GUE-NGL	35	4.8%	(Germany) Lothar Bisky	0
Europe of Freedom and Democracy	EFD	32	4.3%	(United Kingdom) Nigel Farage (Italy) Francesco Speroni	0
Non-Inscrits (Note: Independents, not a group)	NA	27	3.7%	---	1 (Note: After the election ECR expelled McMillan-Scott.)

=== Members in groups by country ===
Political group Country	EPP	S&D	ALDE	Greens/EFA	ECR	GUE-NGL	EFD	NI	MEPs
Austria	6	4		2				3	17
Belgium	5	5	5	4	1			2	22
Bulgaria	6	4	5					2	17
Cyprus	2	2				2			6
Czech Republic	2	7			9	4			22
Denmark	1	4	3	2		1	2		13
Estonia	1	1	3	1					6
Finland	4	2	4	2			1		13
France	29	14	6	14		5	1	3	72
Germany	42	23	12	14		8			99
Greece	8	8		1		3	2		22
Hungary	14	4			1			3	22
Ireland	4	3	4			1			12
Italy	35	21	7				9		72
Latvia	3	1	1	1	1	1			8
Lithuania	4	3	2		1		2		12
Luxembourg	3	1	1	1					6
Malta	2	3							5
Netherlands	5	3	6	3	1	2	1	4	25
Poland	28	7			15				50
Portugal	10	7				5			22
Romania	14	11	5					3	33
Slovakia	6	5	1				1		13
Slovenia	3	2	2						7
Spain	23	21	2	2		1		1	50
Sweden	5	5	4	3		1			18
United Kingdom		13	11	5	25	1	13	4	72
Total	265	184	84	55	54	35	32	27	736

== Leadership ==
=== Presidents ===
Term	President (or candidate)	Group	State	Votes
14 July 2009 – 17 January 2012	Jerzy Buzek	EPP	Poland	555
14 July 2009 – 17 January 2012	Eva-Britt Svensson	GUE-NGL	Sweden	89
17 January 2012– 17 April 2014	Martin Schulz	PES	Germany	387
17 January 2012– 17 April 2014	Nirj Deva	ECR	United Kingdom	142
17 January 2012– 17 April 2014	Diana Wallis	ALDE	United Kingdom	141

=== Vice-Presidents ===
Group	Vice-president (or candidate)	State	Votes in:			Pick
Group	Vice-president (or candidate)	State	1st round	2nd round	3rd round	Pick
EPP	Rodi Kratsa-Tsagaropoulou	Greece	355	---	---	
EPP	Roberta Angelilli	Italy	277	266	274	
EPP	Alejo Vidal-Quadras	Spain	332	303	308	
EPP	Pál Schmitt	Hungary	266	239	257	
EPP	Rainer Wieland	Germany	267	235	237	
S&D	Giovanni Pittella	Italy	360	---	---	
S&D	Stavros Lambrinidis	Greece	348	---	---	
S&D	Miguel Angel Martínez Martínez	Spain	330	292	327	
S&D	Dagmar Roth-Behrendt	Germany	299	288	287	
S&D	Libor Rouček	Czech Republic	284	276	278	
ALDE	Diana Wallis	(United Kingdom) UK	303	274	272	
ALDE	Silvana Koch-Mehrin	Germany	148	141	186	
ECR	Michał Kamiński	Poland	194	175	174	
ECR	Edward McMillan-Scott (non-attached) (Note: After the election ECR threw McMillan-Scott away.)	(United Kingdom) UK	237	242	244	
GREENS/EFA	Isabelle Durant	Belgium	268	259	276	

=== Quaestors ===
Group	Quaestor (or candidate)	State	Votes in:			Pick
Group	Quaestor (or candidate)	State	1st round	2nd round	3rd round	Pick
EPP	Jim Higgins	(Republic of Ireland) Ireland	352	---	---	
EPP	Astrid Lulling	Luxembourg	322	327	306	
EPP	Ria Oomen-Ruijten	Netherlands	161	187	186	
S&D	Lidia Geringer de Oedenberg	Poland	398	---	---	
ALDE	Bill Newton Dunn	(United Kingdom) UK	164	202	208	
ECR	James Nicholson	(United Kingdom) UK	171	172	176	
GUE-NGL	Jiří Maštálka	Czech Republic	206	283	293	
EFD	Francesco Speroni	Italy	145	130	131	

== Membership ==
After the 2009 election, the members formed seven groups with around 26 independent members, mainly from the far right which failed to unify into a political group. With the Treaty of Lisbon not in force in time for the elections, the national distribution followed the rules of the Treaty of Nice which necessitated a reduction to 736 members. Extra members will join the chamber if Lisbon comes into force.

The seventh parliament ended with a total of 766 MEPs (including Croatia) and was slimmed down to 751 at the start of the eight parliament.

For the seventh parliament, the number of women increased from 31% to 35% (the highest to date, from 16% in 1979) with increases in most countries. The largest percentage was in Sweden, with 56% of MEPs women, followed by Estonia with 50%. The lowest was Malta with no women members at all, followed by the Czech Republic with 18%, down from 21%.

From inauguration, the youngest member was Emilie Turunen of Denmark (born in 1984 making her 25) and the oldest member was Ciriaco de Mita of Italy (born 1928 making him 81). Usually the oldest member would preside over the chamber for the election of the Parliament's president. However, with concern that the far-right Jean-Marie Le Pen would be the oldest member (rather than De Mita) the rules were changed to give this role to the outgoing President.

Groups

Group	Seats	
Group	Inauguration	5 March 2010
European People's Party	265	265
Socialists and Democrats	184	184
Liberals and Democrats	84	85 ^{3}
Greens/European Free Alliance	55	55
Conservatives and Reformists	55	54 ^{1}
European United Left – Nordic Green Left	35	35
Europe of Freedom and Democracy	32	30 ^{2}^{,}^{4}
Non-attached	26	28

^{1} Edward McMillan-Scott was expelled from the Conservative Party on 15 September 2009;
^{2} Nikki Sinclaire was expelled from the UK Independence Party on 4 March 2010.
^{3} Edward McMillan-Scott joined Liberal Democrats on 12 March 2010.

^{4} Mike Nattrass left UK Independence Party on 23 June 2010.

Apportionment

State	Seats	State	Seats
Germany	99	France	72
(United Kingdom) UK	72	Italy	72
Spain	50	Poland	50
Romania	33	Netherlands	25
Greece	22	Portugal	22
Belgium	22	Czech Republic	22
Hungary	22	Sweden	18
Austria	17	Bulgaria	17
Denmark	13	Slovakia	13
Finland	13	(Republic of Ireland) Ireland	12
Lithuania	12	Latvia	8
Slovenia	7	Estonia	6
Cyprus	6	Luxembourg	6
Malta	5	Total	736

== Secretariat ==
Office	Post	Name	Source
Office of the Secretary-General	Secretary-General of the European Parliament	(Germany) Klaus Welle	
Legal Service	Jurisconsult of the European Parliament	(France) Christian Pennera	
Directorate-General for the Presidency	Director-General	(Italy) Francesca Ratti	
Directorate-General for Internal Policies of the Union	Director-General	(Italy) Riccardo Ribera d'Alcala	
Directorate-General for External Policies of the Union	Director-General	(Belgium) Luis Marco Aguiriano Nalda	
Directorate-General for Communication	Director-General	(Spain) Juana Lahousse-Juarez	
Directorate-General for Personnel	Director-General	(Belgium) Yves Quittin	
Directorate-General for Infrastructure and Logistics	Director-General	(Greece) Constantin Stratigakis	
Directorate-General for Translation	Director-General	?	
Directorate-General for Interpretation and Conferences	Director-General	?	
Directorate-General for Finance	Director-General	?	
