= Elections in Poitou-Charentes =

This page gathers the results of elections in Poitou-Charentes.

== Regional elections ==
=== 2004 regional election ===
In the 2004 regional election, which took place on March 21 and March 28, 2004, Ségolène Royal (PS) was elected president, defeating incumbent Élisabeth Morin (UMP). Royal remains president to date.

Candidate	Party	Votes (Round One)	% (Round One)	Votes (Round Two)	% (Round Two)
Ségolène Royal	PS-PRG-PCF-Verts	350,466	46.29%	448,950	55.10%
Élisabeth Morin	UMP-UDF-MPF	249,373	32.93%	294,959	36.20%
Jean-Romée Charbonneau	FN	79,484	10.50%	70,898	8.70%
Gérard Fontenay	CPNT	43,645	5.76%	-	-
Claude Quemar	LO/LCR	34,221	4.52%	-	-
Total		757,189	100.00%	814,807	100.00%
