= Marc Angel =

Luxembourgish politician (born 1963)

Marc Angel MEP
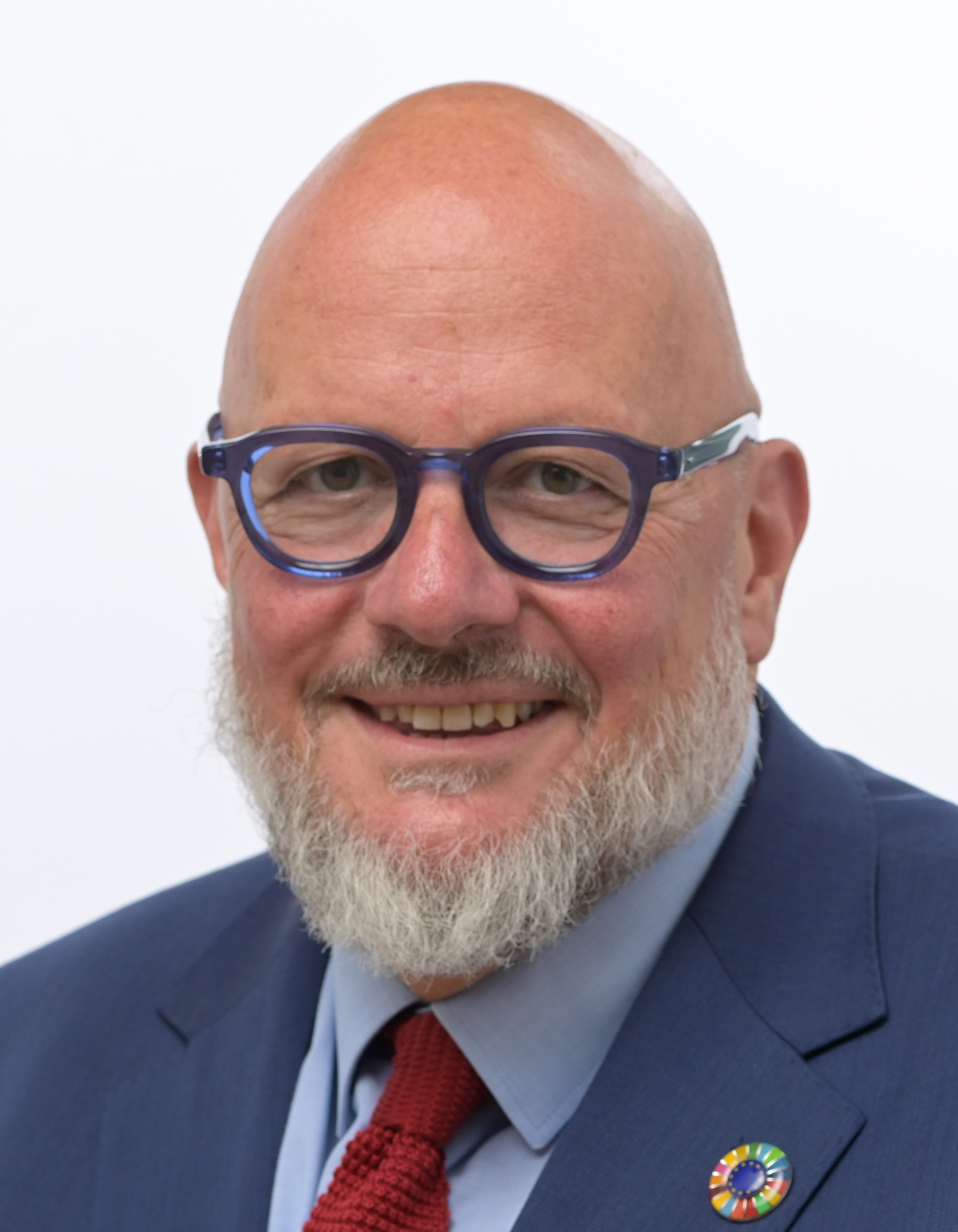
- Official portrait, 2024

Quaestor of the European Parliament
- Incumbent
- Assumed office 16 July 2024 Serving with Andrey Kovatchev, Miriam Lexmann, Fabienne Keller and Kosma Złotowski

Vice-President of the European Parliament
- In office 18 January 2023 – 16 July 2024 Serving with See List
- Preceded by: Eva Kaili

Member of the European Parliament for Luxembourg
- Incumbent
- Assumed office 10 December 2019
- Preceded by: Nicolas Schmit

Personal details
- Born: 12 March 1963 (age 63) Luxembourg City, Luxembourg
- Party: Luxembourg Socialist Workers' Party
- Education: University of Vienna

Marc Angel (Luxembourgish pronunciation: [ˈmɑʁkˈɑ̃ŋəl]; born 12 March 1963) is a Luxembourgish politician of the Luxembourg Socialist Workers' Party (LSAP) who has served as a Member of the European Parliament (MEP) since 2019 and was one of its vice presidents from 2023 to 2024.. In the European Parliament he is known for being a "Champion of Equality".

== Education ==
Angel completed his high school education at the Athénée de Luxembourg, where he was a classmate of future prime minister Luc Frieden. He attended the University of Vienna between 1984-1988 and earned a degree (Mag. Phil.) as a translator for German, French and English. Thereafter he continued his tourism economy studies at the Vienna University of Economics and Business between 1988 and 1990.

== Work experience ==
Between 1990 and 2004 Angel taught at Luxembourg's hotel and tourism management school.

== Political career ==
=== Early beginnings ===
Angel started his political career in the Luxembourg City Council as its Member between 1994 and 2020.

=== Member of the Luxembourgish Parliament ===
Angel became a Member of the Luxembourgish Parliament in 2004 and, as of 2013, he was acting chair of the Committee for Foreign and European Affairs, International Development, Immigration and Asylum. He was also a member of:

- the Committee on Gender Issues,
- the Health Committee,
- the Economic Affairs Committee,
- the Institutional Affairs Committee.

As a Member of the Luxembourgish Parliament, he also became:

- Treasurer of the NATO Parliamentary Assembly,
- President of the Luxembourg Delegation to COSAC,
- President of the Luxembourg Delegation to the Benelux Parliament.

He resigned from the Parliament in December 2019 after becoming a Member of the European Parliament.

=== Member of the European Parliament ===
Angel became a Member of the European Parliament on the 10 December 2019. Beside acting as head of the Luxembourgish Delegation in the S&D group, he has served on the Committee on Employment and Social Affairs (since 2019) and the Committee on Petitions (since 2020). He is a substitute member of the Committee on the Internal Market and Consumer Protection and the Committee on Economic and Monetary Affairs.

In addition to his committee assignments, Angel is part of the Parliament's delegation to the EU-Chile Joint Parliamentary Committee, to the Euro-Latin American Parliamentary Assembly and for relations with China. He also co-chairs the European Parliament Intergroup on LGBT Rights.

Since 2021, Angel has been part of the Parliament's delegation to the Conference on the Future of Europe.

From 2023 to 2024, Angel served as vice-president of the European Parliament, replacing Eva Kaili. Following the 2024 European elections, he became a quaestor of the European Parliament, making him again part of the Parliament's leadership under President Roberta Metsola.

== Other activities ==
- In 1990, Angel co-founded STOP AIDS NOW a.s.b.l in Luxembourg.
- In 2008, Angel was appointed as honorary consul of the Republic of Cap Verde in Luxembourg.
- As of 2010, Angel has served as the honorary president of the LCTO - Luxembourg City Tourist Office.
- As of 2015, he has been a UNAIDS Champion for the 90-90-90 Treatment Target.
