= List of presidents of Poitou-Charentes =

This is the list of presidents of Poitou-Charentes since 1974. Regional legislatures are directly elected since 1986.

Presidents of Poitou-Charentes
President	Party	Term
Lucien Grand	CD	1974–1976
Jacques Fouchier	CD	1976–1978
Francis Hardy	RPR	1978–1980
Fernand Chaussebourg	UDF-CDS	1980–1981
Michel Boucher	UDF-CDS	1981–1982
Jacques Santrot	PS	1982
Raoul Cartraud	PS	1982–1985
René Monory	UDF-CDS	1985–1986
Louis Fruchard	UDF-CDS	1986–1988
Jean-Pierre Raffarin	UDF/DL	1988–2002
Dominique de la Martinière	UMP	2002
Élisabeth Morin	UMP	2002–2004
Ségolène Royal	PS	2004–
