= Maštálka =

Maštálka is a surname. Notable people with the surname include:

- Jiří Maštálka (born 1956), Czech politician and physician
- Josef Mastalka (1885–1953), Austrian footballer
