= Parliamentary Bureau =

Parliamentary Bureau may refer to:

- Bureau (European Parliament)
- Parliamentary Bureau of the Scottish Parliament
