= Gilles Boyer =

French politician of the Horizons party (born 1971)

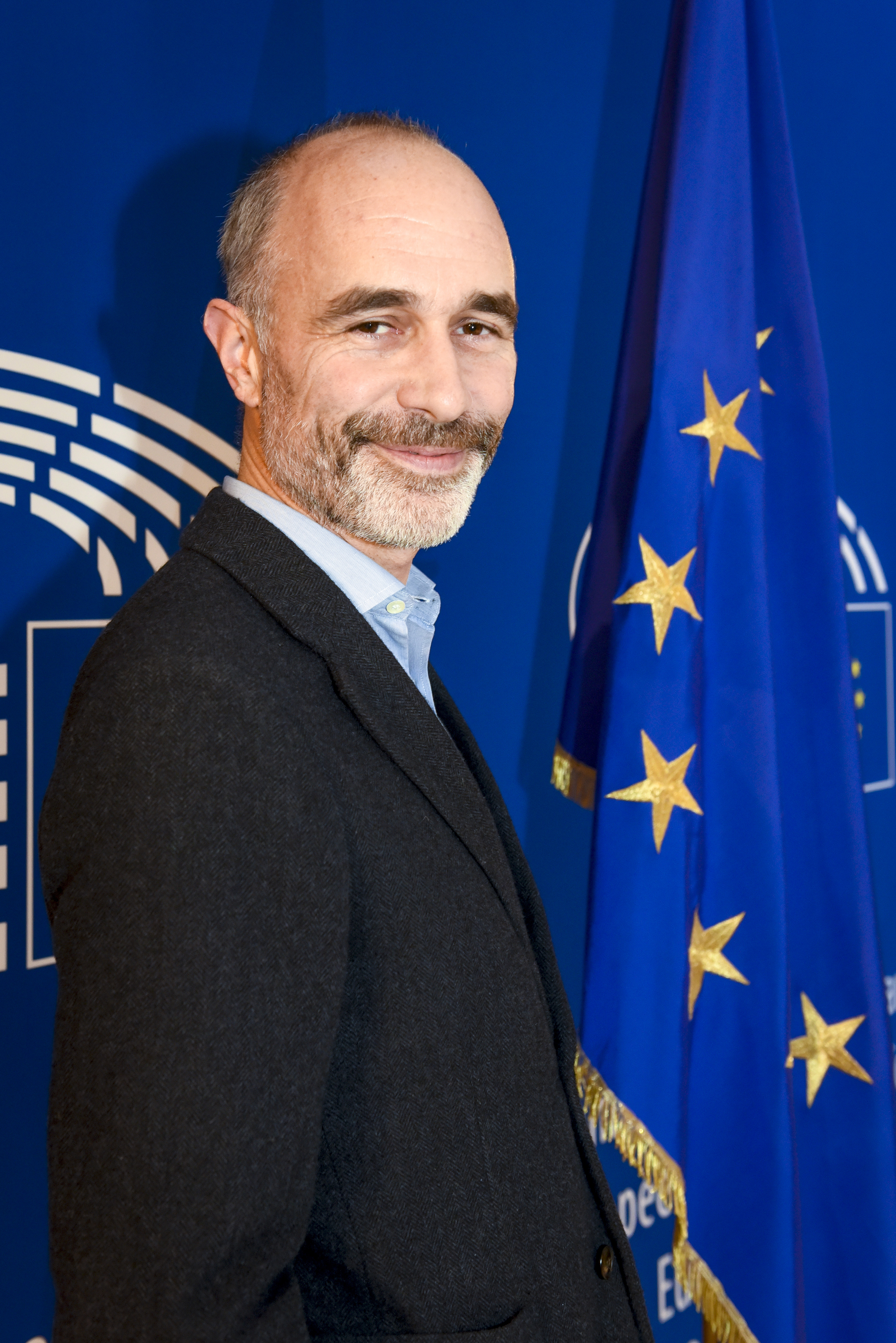

Member of the European Parliament
- Incumbent
- Assumed office 2 July 2019
- Constituency: France

Quaestor of the European Parliament
- In office 2 July 2019 – 18 January 2022
- President: David Sassoli
- Succeeded by: Fabienne Keller

Personal details
- Born: 4 July 1971 (age 55) Paris, France
- Party: Renew Europe; Horizons
- Education: Paris Nanterre University; University of Paris 1 Panthéon-Sorbonne

Gilles Boyer (born 4 July 1971) is a French politician of the Horizons party. He has served as a Member of the European Parliament since 2019 and was re-elected in 2024.

== Early life and education ==
Born to two university professors in Paris, Boyer spent his childhood in Sèvres and in Ville-d'Avray in the Hauts-de-Seine region. He obtained a master's degree in law from Paris Nanterre University and a postgraduate degree in public law in 1993 from Paris 1 Panthéon-Sorbonne University.

== Early career ==
From 2002 to 2004, Boyer served as chief of staff to Mayor of Bordeaux Alain Juppé at Bordeaux City Hall. After Juppé lost his office as mayor, he worked for media company Groupe M6 from 2004 until 2006. In 2006, he co-wrote a political novel with Édouard Philippe.

Boyer later worked as political advisor to Juppé during his time as Minister of Defense (2010–2011) and the Minister for Foreign Affairs (2011–2012).

Boyer ran Alain Juppé’s campaign in the primaries of The Republicans (LR) in 2016. Following the 2017 presidential election, he served as adviser to Philippe in his capacity as Prime Minister.

== Political career ==
In the 2017 legislative elections, Boyer unsuccessfully ran as an LR candidate in Hauts-de-Seine's 8th constituency, losing against Jacques Maire.

From 2019 until 2022, Boyer was a quaestor of the European Parliament for two and a half years. His role as quaestor made him part of the Parliament's leadership under President David Sassoli.

Boyer has been a member of the Committee on Economic and Monetary Affairs (since 2019) and the Subcommittee on Tax Matters (since 2020). He also serves on the five-member Advisory Committee on the Conduct of Members, the parliament’s body responsible for assessing alleged breaches of its code of conduct and advising the President of the European Parliament on possible action to be taken,

In addition to his committee assignments, Boyer is part of the MEPs Against Cancer group.

In May 2022, Boyer – together with Stéphane Séjourné for Renaissance and Patrick Mignola for the Democratic Movement (MoDem) – negotiated the agreement leading to the creation of Ensemble, a coalition of the parties forming the presidential majority, including on the financial distribution between them.

In 2026, Boyer joined the leadership team for Édouard Philippe’s 2027 presidential campaign, alongside Marie Guévenoux and Christophe Béchu.

== Other activities ==
- École nationale d'administration (ÉNA), Member of the Board of Directors (since 2019)

== Controversy ==
In 2019, Boyer had to publicly apologize for using what he called “an ill-chosen word” after saying mayors who refused to fall into line would be considered Emmanuel Macron’s “enemies” at the time of the 2022 presidential election.

== Personal life ==
Boyer has two daughters.
