= Karol Karski =

Polish politician (born 1966)

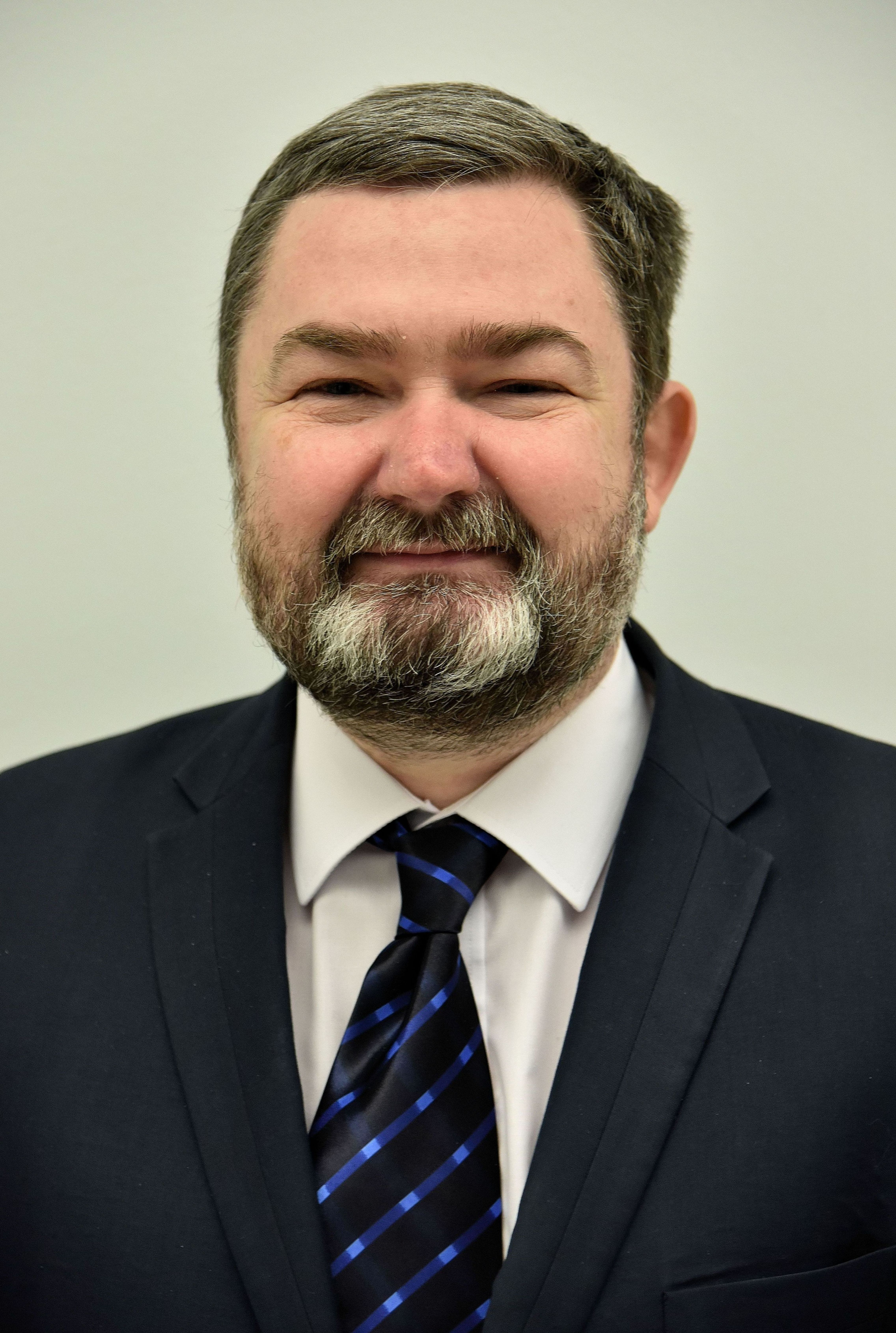

Member of the European Parliament
- Incumbent
- Assumed office 1 July 2014
- Constituency: Poland

Quaestor of the European Parliament
- In office 2 July 2014 – 20 January 2022 Serving with Élisabeth Morin, Andrey Kovatchev, Catherine Bearder, Vladimír Maňka

Personal details
- Born: 13 May 1966 (age 59)
- Party: Law and Justice

Karol Adam Karski (born 13 May 1966) is a Polish politician, Quaestor of the European Parliament, and a former Vice-Minister of Foreign Affairs. He holds a Doctor of Law degree from the University of Warsaw. Karski has taught at the University of Warsaw, the Warsaw University of Humanities, and the Academy of Economics in Białystok. He was elected to the Sejm on 25 September 2005 and on 21 October 2007 in 19 Warsaw district as a candidate from the Law and Justice list.

== See also ==
- Members of Polish Sejm 2005-2007
