= Anne Sander (politician) =

French economist and politician (born 1973)

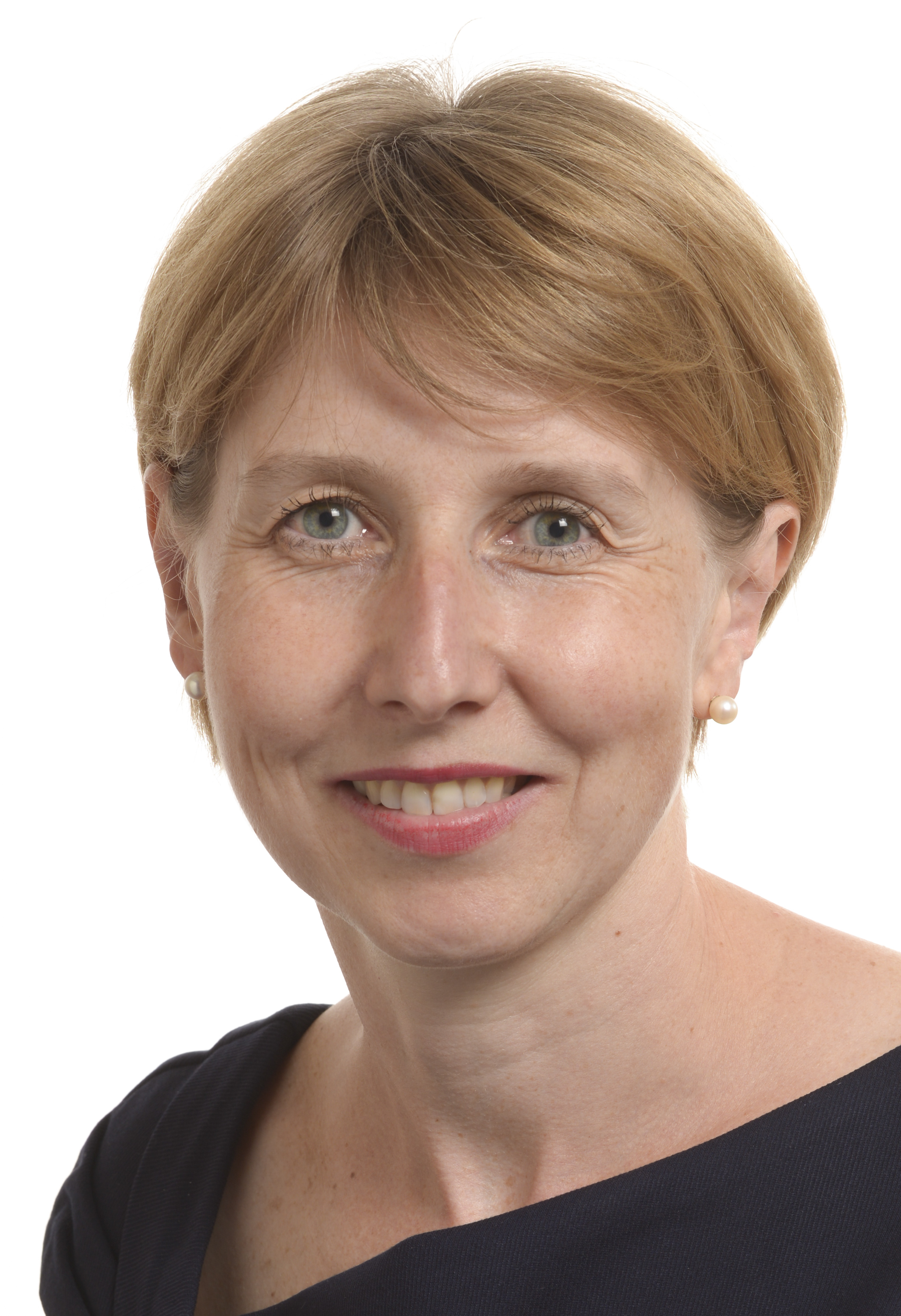

Quaestor of the European Parliament
- In office 2 July 2019 – 15 July 2024 Serving with See List

Member of the European Parliament
- In office 1 July 2014 – 15 July 2024
- Constituency: France

Personal details
- Born: 1 October 1973 (age 53) Haguenau, France
- Party: The Republicans
- Parent: Jean-Marie Sander (father)
- Education: University of Strasbourg

Anne Sander (born 1 October 1973) is a French economist and politician of the Republicans who has been serving as a Member of the European Parliament from 2014 to 2024 and as one of the five Quaestors of the European Parliament from 2019 to 2024.

== Early life ==
Sander was born on 1 October 1973 in Haguenau, a small town in northeastern France.

== Political career ==
Since the 2014 European elections, Sander has been a Member of the European Parliament (MEP) for The Republicans, within the Group of the European People's Party. She has served on the Committee on Employment and Social Affairs (2014–2017), the Committee on Economic and Monetary Affairs (2017–2019) and on the Committee on Agriculture and Rural Development (since 2019). In the latter capacity, she was her parliamentary group's shadow rapporteur on a 2020 reform of the Common Agricultural Policy (CAP).

In addition to her committee assignments, Sander is a member of the parliament's delegation for relations with the EEA countries and Switzerland. She is also a member of the European Parliament Intergroup on Climate Change, Biodiversity and Sustainable Development, the European Parliament Intergroup on Trade Unions and of the URBAN Intergroup.

Following the 2019 elections, Sander became the First quaestor of the European Parliament. Her role as first quaestor made her part of the Parliament's leadership under Presidents David Sassoli (2019–2022) and Roberta Metsola (since 2022). In this capacity, she was part of the committee that investigated the case of Monica Semedo, the first MEP to be suspended from her parliamentary activities over allegations of “psychological harassment”.

== Political positions ==
In the Republicans’ 2016 presidential primaries, Sander endorsed Bruno Le Maire as the party's candidate for the office of President of France. In the party's 2017 leadership election, she later supported Laurent Wauquiez.
