= Andrey Kovatchev =

Bulgarian politician (born 1967)

- Андрей Ковачев
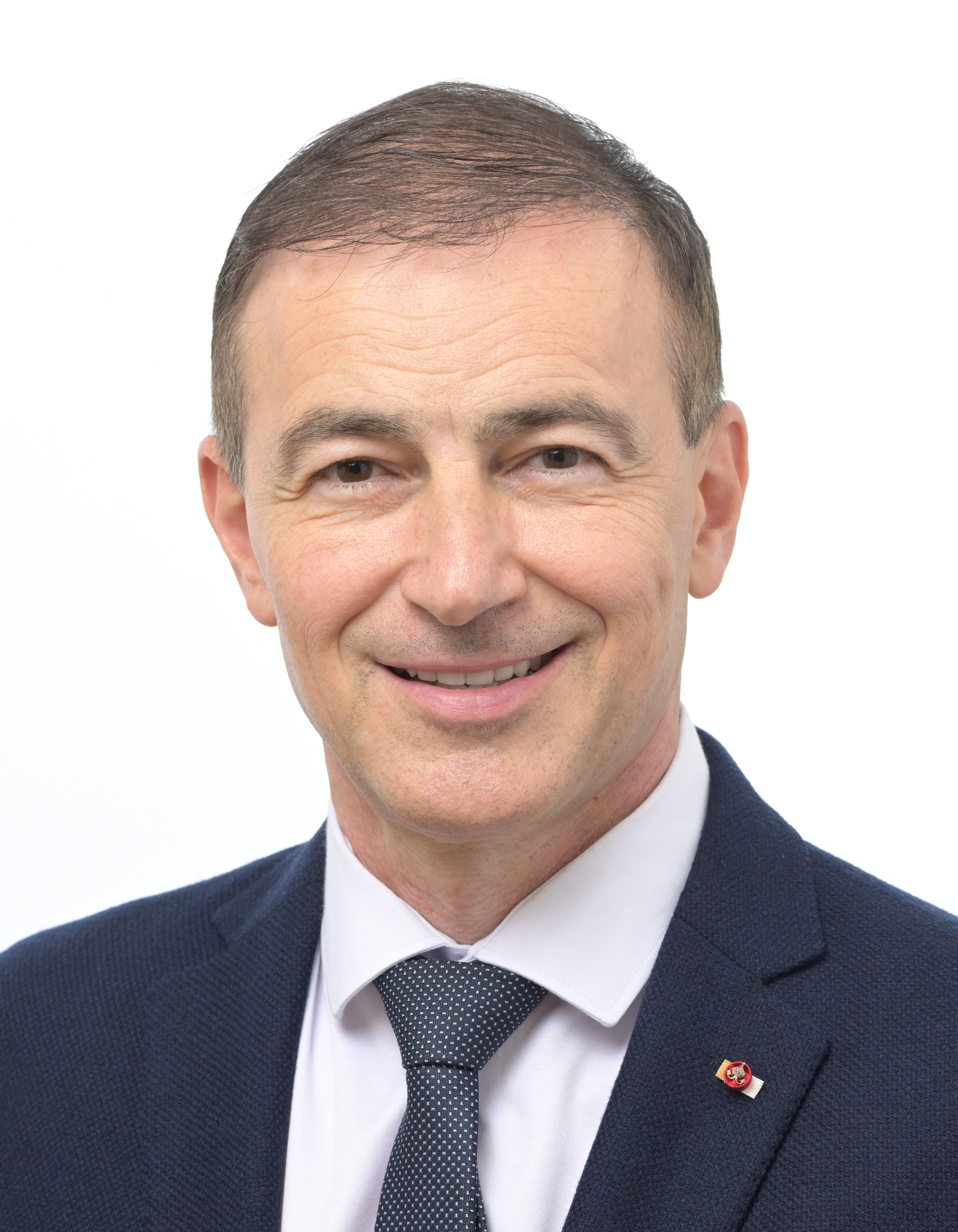

Quaestor of the European Parliament
- In office 2 July 2014 – 1 July 2019 Serving with Élisabeth Morin, Karol Karski, Catherine Bearder, Vladimír Maňka
- Preceded by: Jim Higgins
- Succeeded by: Anne Sander

Member of the European Parliament for Bulgaria
- Incumbent
- Assumed office 24 August 2009
- Preceded by: Nikolay Mladenov

Personal details
- Born: 13 December 1967 (age 58) Sofia, PR Bulgaria
- Party: Bulgaria: GERB (European Union) EU: EPP
- Education: Saarland University (BS, MS, PhD)
- Occupation: politician
- Website: andrey-kovatchev.eu

Andrey Andreev Kovatchev (Bulgarian: Андрей Андреев Ковачев; born 13 December 1967), is a Bulgarian politician, Member of the European Parliament, a federalist and Head of the Bulgarian Delegation in the EPP Group in the European Parliament. Kovatchev is a chairman of the Union of European Federalists in Bulgaria. Since 2011 he has also been its vice-president. In January 2012 he was elected vice-chair of AFET – Committee on Foreign Affairs of the European Parliament.

== Early life and education ==
Andrey Kovatchev was born in Sofia.

He has a degree in Biology form Saarland University, Germany (1990–1995). Later he obtained a PhD in biology from the same university.

== Work experience ==
In the period 1995–1998, Kovatchev was a university assistant in Saarland University, Germany. Later he did a traineeship at the European Parliament. In 1998 he became a Commercial Director at Alfa Laval Agri and in 2002 he became a Commercial Manager for John Deere. Between 2004 and 2009 Andrey Kovatchev was a Regional Director for Central and East Europe for Elsevier.

== Political career ==
From 2007 Andrey Kovatchev is a Vice- chairman of the Committee on Foreign Policy and European Affairs and Vice – International Secretary of political party GERB. Andrey Kovatchev became a Member of the European Parliament after the elections in 2009 form the ticket of PP GERB. Between March 2011 and November 2018 Andrey Kovatchev was vice-president of the Union of European Federalists. Furthermore, he is a Chairman of the Union of the European Federalists in Bulgaria. Since January 2012 he is vice-chairman of AFET - Committee on Foreign Affairs of the European Parliament.

2014 - till now

Member of European Parliament Presidency (Quaestor),

member of the Committee on Foreign Policy and European Affairs and

member of the Subcommittee on Security and Defence and the Delegation for

Relations with the United States. Substitute of the Committee on the

Environment, Public Health and Food Safety. Substitute of

Parliamentary Committee EU-FYROM

2009–2014 Member of the European Parliament, Head of the Bulgarian Delegation in the EPP Group in the European Parliament, member of the Committee on Foreign Affairs and the Subcommittee on Security and Defence, deputy member the Committee on Regional Development

Member of the Delegation for Relations with the United States and substitute in the Delegation for relations with the countries of Southeast Asia and the Association of Southeast Asian Nations (ASEAN).

President of the Union of European Federalists in Bulgaria and vice-president of UEF from March 2010.

In 2012, Kovatchev was elected for vice-chairman of the Committee on Foreign Affairs of the European Parliament.

== Activities and positions in the European Parliament ==
Kovatchev is a Member and a vice-chair of the European Parliament Committee on Foreign Affairs; he is a member of the Subcommittee on Security and Defence and the Delegation of the European Union to the United States; He is a Substitute of the Committee on Regional Development and in the Delegation for Relations with the countries of Southeast Asia and the Association of Southeast Asian Nations (ASEAN).

== Communism and Transition ==
On 17 November 2010, Kovatchev organized a Conference in the European Parliament on The endured European Dream of Bulgaria 1944–1989. Senior leaders of the European Parliament and the EPP Group took part in the event, including the President of the European Parliament Mr. Jerzy Buzek, the President of the EPP Group Mr. Joseph Daul and the former President of the EP and chairman of the Board of Directors of the ’’Konrad Adenauer’’ Foundation Dr. Hans – Gert Poettering. A number of political prisoners from the communist era attended the conference. Among the participants were Bulgarians of Turkish origin persecuted during the so-called "Revival process" (a repressive campaign of the Bulgarian Communist Party in the 1980s which culminated in a mass exodus of reportedly more than 100,000 Bulgarian Turks), as well as many other citizens whose personal paths are connected with the communist repressive machine - the "State Security".

The event had enjoyed a great interest among the academic community, journalists, organization of people persecuted during the communist regime and citizens interested in the history of totalitarianism in Eastern Europe.

According to the President of the European Parliament, Jerzy Buzek who opened the conference: The Bulgarian opposition was important because it preserved European values - democracy, the right of ownership, the ideas of freedom of thought and expression – which are the basis of the European Union.

From 2011, Kovatchev supports a website that brings to light the repressive methods of the communist regime in Bulgaria (1944–1989). This website- edited by Hristo Hristov – a journalist and participant in the conference - grew into the richest source of information on the former communist secret police in Bulgaria, the Bulgarian Communist party, as well as on documents concerning the influence of the communist secret police on the Bulgarian economic life after 1989 and the transition to democracy and market economy.

== Reform in Bulgaria's Diplomatic Service ==
Kovatchev is a Member of the Working Group in the EP for Reconciliation of European Histories. He is the supporter of opening the communist archives of all former communist countries. In particular he supported the 2011 reform in the Bulgarian diplomatic service and legal changes made in 2011 by the Bulgarian Government seeking to limit the influence of the former State Security agents in the Bulgarian State and diplomacy.

According to Kovatchev ’’The law is not a whim of the Minister of Foreign Affairs as his opponents present it, this is continuation of a battle, as old as the Bulgarian transition. The new legislation limits the influence of communist secret services collaborators on Bulgaria's diplomacy. This battle is part of the struggle for transitional justice of the Bulgarian society.

== European Integration of the Western Balkans ==
In his role as a Member of the European Parliament, Kovatchev pays significant attention to the Western Balkans and their European perspective. He considers that the integration of Western Balkans is the only way to peace and prosperity in this region, Kovatchev has stated many times his support to the reformist governments with a European orientation. Kovatchev is an author of important amendments in EP the resolution on the 2010 Progress report on North Macedonia. For the first time the Resolution "underlines the importance of the preservation and maintenance of the cultural heritage, which is a pillar of European values and principles" Furthermore, the European Parliament "notes with regrets that numerous cemeteries, fresco inscriptions and artefacts, which belong to the Bulgarian cultural heritage, have been totally abandoned and ruined".

Kovatchev has expressed on numerous occasions his concern about ’’the discrimination in North Macedonia, especially for the citizens who candid announced their Bulgarian self-consciousness. Unfortunately, in many cases these people have been abused and they have been victims of arbitrary judgments, denial of work rights, politically motivated arrests and imprisonment".

In Kovatchev's point of view it is very important for the integration of Macedonia in Europe that people are familiar with the objective history of their own country. A necessary step in this process is making public the archives of the communist secret services of former Yugoslavia, as well as unveiling the names of those connected with the secret police. Kovatchev repeatedly reminds the Macedonian politicians the difficult steps of Bulgaria on its way to United Europe, last but not least because of the influence of the former secret services in the economic and political life of the country.

His advice to Serbia is similar; he repeatedly sent a request to the authorities and representatives to review the archives of the Yugoslav communist secret services (the Department of State Security) and to submit them to the other former Yugoslav States.

Kovatchev is a supporter of the visa-free regime between the EU and all Western Balkan countries. He staunchly opposes to the tendency to restore the visa regime with some of them, because ’’the experience shows that visas hinders the citizens to become well acquainted with United Europe.’’

== Economic Governance in the EU ==
Kovatchev is among the supporters of common economic governance in the EU. He asserts that the single currency should be supported by economic and fiscal policies and coordination at supranational level. His views in this respect are federalist, namely, that the EU member states should overcome the intergovernmental instinct in the economic area and move quicker towards creation of supranational mechanisms in the field of economic policy. His opinion for the single currency and its economic base is that it won't be stable when the countries do not work together on issues of economic and budgetary nature.

== Position on constitutional affairs of the EU ==
Kovatchev is supportive of the pan-European lists for European Parliament elections. According to the measure, proposed by British liberal MEP Andrew Duff, a small part of the MEPs are elected with a trans-national European list, thus forming an EU constituency. According to Kovatchev, the initiative is an unambiguous sign that the federal project is the only way toward for Europe. Despite the divisions in almost all parliamentary groups and the strong opposition from leading MEPs in the EPP, the Bulgarian MEP asserts that the rejection of this proposal by the new reinvigorated European Parliament would be surrender to national populism. For him and many other federalist, pan-European lists expand the political space from the regional and national to the supranational. Such European representation would strengthen the legitimacy of the European political parties.

As a next step for strengthening the democratic legitimacy of EU institutions, Kovatchev proposes to merge the position of President of the European Council and the European Commission in one President of the European Union who could be elected by the European citizens directly.
