= Politics of Poitou-Charentes =

The Politics of Poitou-Charentes, France takes place in a framework of a presidential representative democracy, whereby the President of Regional Council is the head of government, and of a pluriform multi-party system. Legislative power is vested in the regional council.

== Executive ==
The executive of the region is led by the President of the regional council.

=== List of presidents ===
Presidents of Poitou-Charentes
President	Party	Term
Lucien Grand	CD	1974–1976
Jacques Fouchier	CD	1976–1978
Francis Hardy	RPR	1978–1980
Fernand Chaussebourg	UDF-CDS	1980–1981
Michel Boucher	UDF-CDS	1981–1982
Jacques Santrot	PS	1982
Raoul Cartraud	PS	1982–1985
René Monory	UDF-CDS	1985–1986
Louis Fruchard	UDF-CDS	1986–1988
Jean-Pierre Raffarin	UDF/DL	1988–2002
Dominique de la Martinière	UMP	2002
Élisabeth Morin	UMP	2002–2004
Ségolène Royal	PS	2004–

== Legislative branch ==
The Regional Council of Poitou-Charentes (Conseil régional de Poitou-Charentes) is composed of 56 councillors, elected by proportional representation in a two-round system. The winning list in the second round is automatically entitled to a quarter of the seats. The remainder of the seats are allocated through proportional representation with a 5% threshold.

The Council is elected for a six-year term.

=== Current composition ===
Party		seats
•	Socialist Party	20
	Union for a Popular Movement	8
•	French Communist Party	7
•	The Greens	6
	Miscellaneous Right	6
	National Front	3
•	Left Radical Party	2
•	Miscellaneous Left	2
	Union for French Democracy	1

== Elections ==
=== Other elections ===
In the 2007 legislative election, the PS won 11 seats, the UMP won 4, and the New Centre won one. In addition, one Socialist dissident (Miscellaneous Left won one seat in Charente.
