= Jean-Marie Sander =

French private banker (born 1949)

- Born: December 23, 1949 (age 76); Ohlungen, Bas-Rhin, Alsace, France
- Occupation: Politician

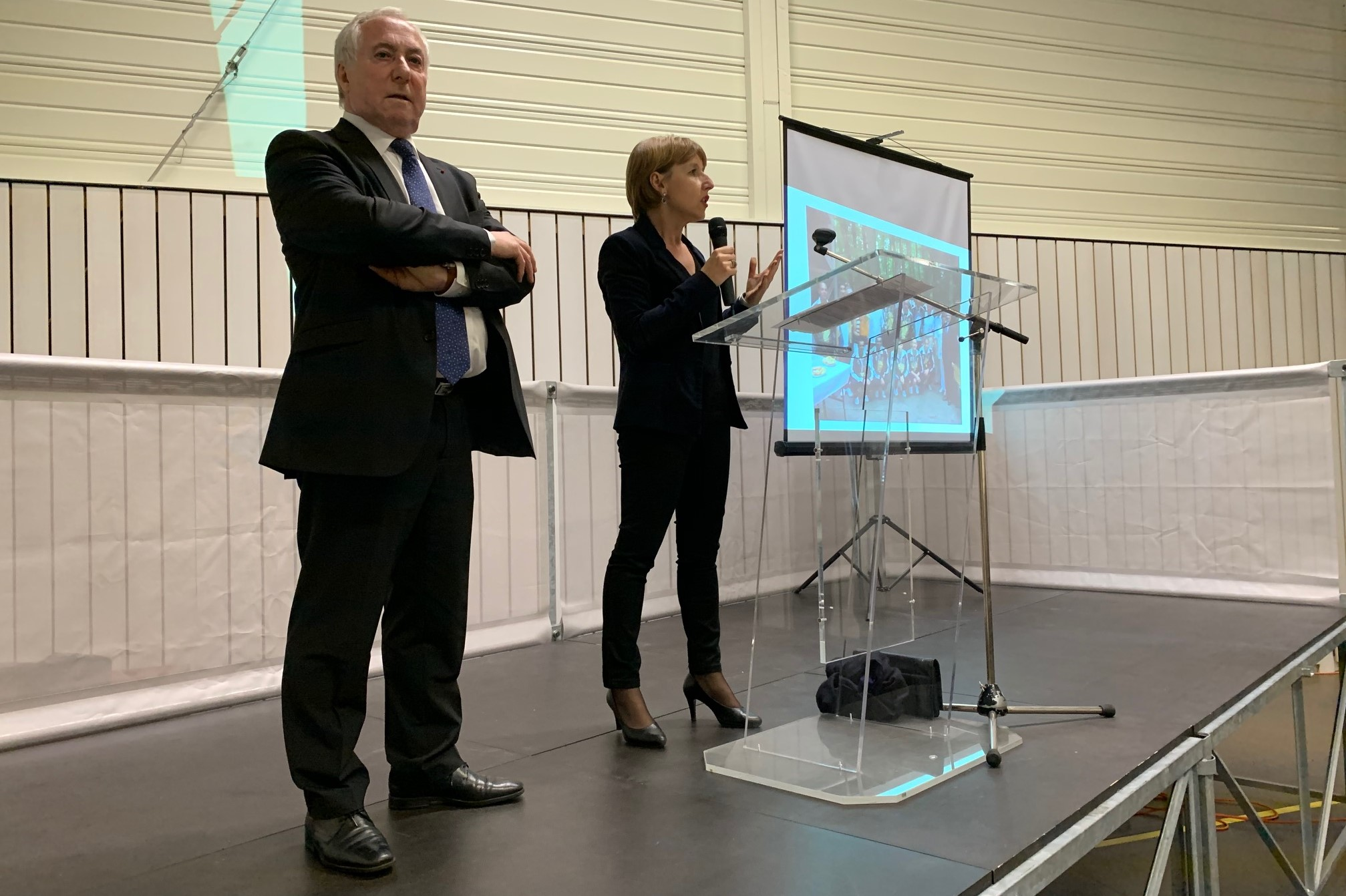
Jean-Marie Sander (left)

Jean-Marie Sander (born December 23, 1949) is a French farmer, politician and banker. He serves as the Chairman of Crédit Agricole.

== Early life ==
Sander was born on December 23, 1949, in Ohlungen, a small town in northeastern France.

== Career ==
Sander inherited 17 hectares of farming land in Ohlungen. He turned it into 100 hectares. He later became the Mayor of Ohlungen.

He has served as the Chairman of Crédit Agricole, a French bank, since May 2010. He will step down in 2015.
