= Christophe Hansen =

Luxembourgish politician

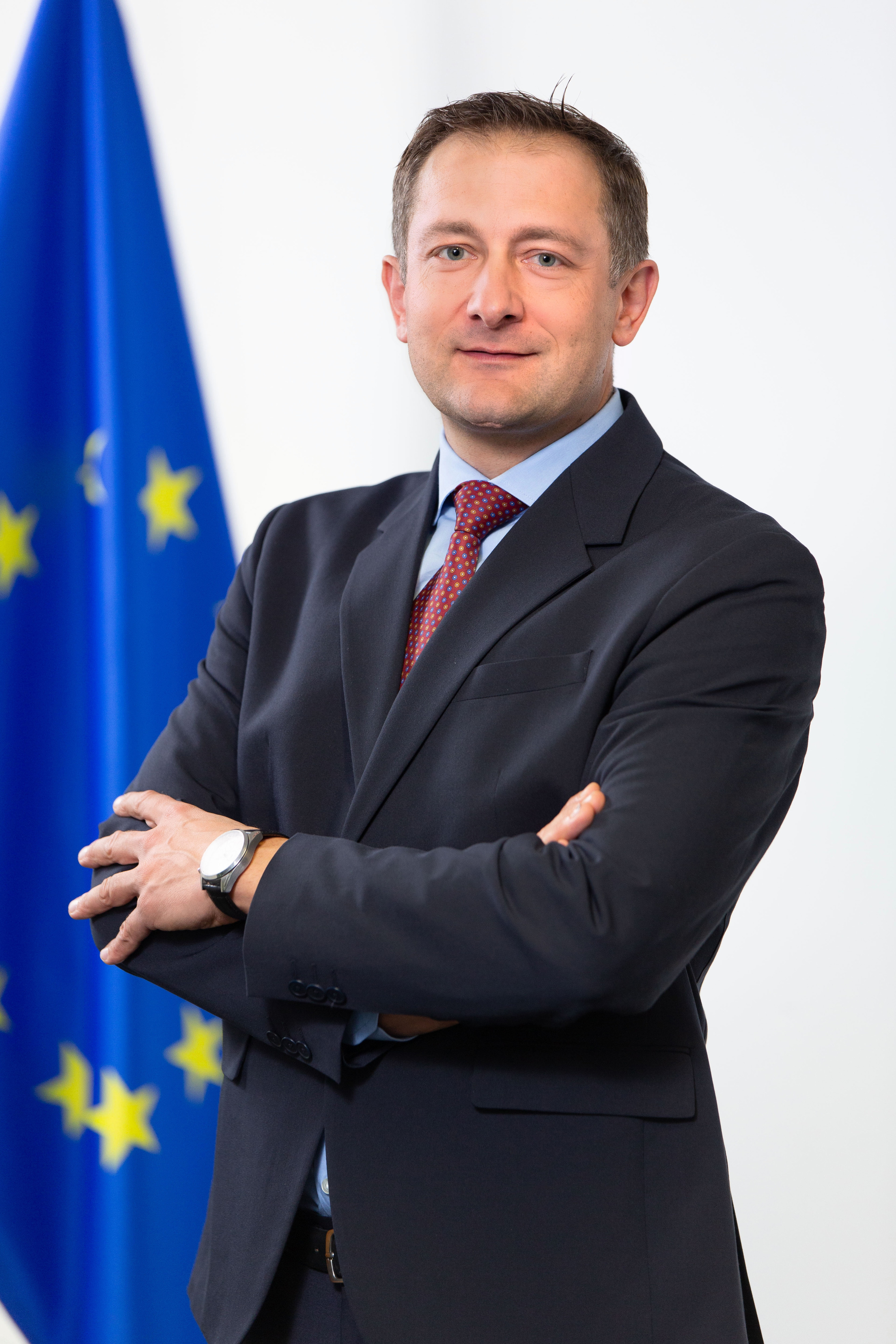
- Official portrait, 2024

European Commissioner for Agriculture and Food
- Incumbent
- Assumed office 1 December 2024
- Commission: Von der Leyen II
- Preceded by: Janusz Wojciechowski

Quaestor of the European Parliament
- In office 20 January 2022 – 23 October 2023 Serving with See List

Member of the European Parliament for Luxembourg
- In office 16 July 2024 – 30 November 2024
- Succeeded by: Martine Kemp
- In office 2 September 2018 – 23 October 2023
- Preceded by: Viviane Reding
- Succeeded by: Martine Kemp

Member of the Chamber of Deputies
- In office 24 October 2023 – 11 July 2024

Personal details
- Born: 21 February 1982 (age 44) Wiltz, Luxembourg
- Party: Christian Social People's Party
- Children: 2
- Relatives: Martine Hansen (cousin)
- Education: Louis Pasteur University

Christophe Hansen (Luxembourgish pronunciation: [ˈkʀistof ˈhɑnzən]; born 21 February 1982) is a Luxembourgish politician belonging to the Christian Social People's Party (CSV), of which he is Secretary-General.

Since September 2018, Hansen has been a Member of the European Parliament for the European People's Party (Christian Democrats) and was elected second quaestor in January 2022. He has been EPP coordinator on the Committee on International Trade (INTA) since 2019 and was notably European Parliament rapporteur for the post-Brexit Trade and Cooperation Agreement with the UK.

He was a municipal councillor for Winseler between 2011 and 2022.

In August 2024, Hansen was nominated by Prime Minister Luc Frieden to be Luxembourg's EU Commissioner

== Early life and education ==
Hansen was born in Wiltz.

After finishing his secondary education at the Lycée du Nord in Wiltz (1995–2002), he went on to study at Louis Pasteur University in Strasbourg, where he completed a master's degree in Geosciences, Environmental Sciences and Risk Management.

Hansen speaks Luxembourgish, French, German, English, Spanish and Dutch.

== Professional career ==
Hansen began working as an adviser for Astrid Lulling MEP in July 2007.

From January 2014 to May 2016, he was Environment Attaché at the Permanent Representation of Luxembourg to the European Union. He also chaired the Council Working Party on the Environment during the 2015 Luxembourgish Presidency.

In 2016, Hansen became an adviser on European affairs at the Luxembourg Chamber of Commerce, and Economic and Commercial attaché at the Embassy of the Grand Duchy of Luxembourg in Brussels. He worked in this role for almost two years, until August 2018.

From March 2017 to August 2018, Hansen was also a member of the European Economic and Social Committee.

== Political career ==
=== Career in national politics ===
Hansen has been a municipal councillor for Winseler since 2011.

In 2018, he was elected chair of the Christian Social People's Party (CSV) northern district committee, serving in that position until 2021.

He has been a member of the CSV national committee since 2018 and has been the party's Secretary-General since 2021.

=== Member of the European Parliament, 2018–present ===
Following her decision to run in the 2018 Luxembourgish general election, Viviane Reding gave up her seat as Member of the European Parliament to Hansen in September 2018. He was re-elected in the 2019 European elections, receiving the second highest number of votes nationwide.

Within the European Parliament, he works primarily on three committees:

- as a member of the Committee on International Trade (INTA)
- as a substitute on the Committee on Economic and Monetary Affairs (ECON)
- as a substitute on the Committee on the Environment, Public Health and Food Safety (ENVI)

As part of his committee assignments, Hansen served as rapporteur on the European Parliament recommendation of 18 June 2020 on the negotiations for a new partnership with the United Kingdom after Brexit. He was also rapporteur on the proposal for a regulation of the European Parliament and of the Council of 16 December 2020 on the application of Union tariff rate quotas and other important quotas.

Under the Finnish Presidency, in his capacity as rapporteur, he negotiated an agreement with the council on the directive on the quality of water intended for human consumption, which was finally concluded in 2020.

Hansen is currently working on three main issues:

- On the Committee on International Trade, he is rapporteur on the proposal for a regulation of the European Parliament and of the council on foreign subsidies distorting the internal market. The report, which was published on 28 April 2022, provides for an instrument to counter foreign companies benefiting from domestic subsidies in amounts that prevent competition by European companies.
- On the Committee on Economic and Monetary Affairs, he is shadow rapporteur for his political group on green bonds. The aim is to promote green bonds while ensuring strict supervision, particularly on matters of transparency.
- On the Committee on the Environment, Public Health and Food Safety, he is rapporteur on the proposal for a regulation on deforestation-free supply chains, which aims to reduce the EU's impact on global deforestation by adopting a clear legal framework.

From 2022 to 2023, Hansen served as one of the European Parliament's five quaestors; at vote on 18 January 2022, he received 576 out of 676 votes in the first round.

== Personal life ==
Hansen is married and has two children. Martine Hansen, Luxembourg's minister of agriculture, is his cousin.
