= Catherine Bearder =

British politician (born 1949)

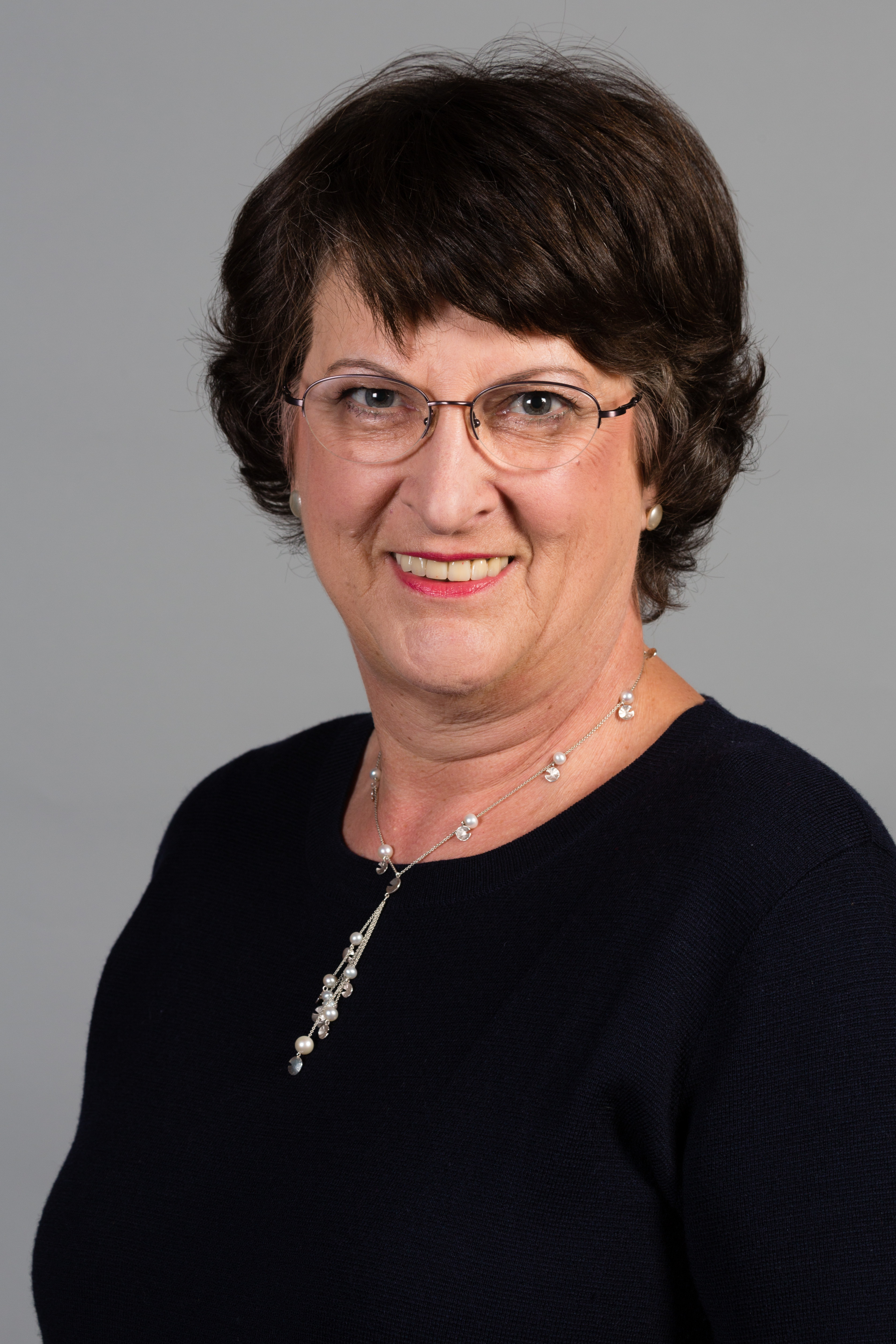
- Bearder in 2014

Leader of the Liberal Democrats in the European Parliament
- In office 2 July 2014 – 12 November 2019
- Deputy: Luisa Porritt
- Leader: Nick Clegg; Tim Farron; Vince Cable; Jo Swinson
- Preceded by: Fiona Hall
- Succeeded by: Caroline Voaden

Liberal Democrat Europe Spokesperson
- In office 28 October 2016 – 31 January 2020
- Leader: Tim Farron; Sir Vince Cable; Jo Swinson; Ed Davey & Sal Brinton (acting)
- Preceded by: Michael Moore
- Succeeded by: Christine Jardine

Quaestor of the European Parliament
- In office 2 July 2014 – 1 July 2019
- President: Martin Schulz; Antonio Tajani
- Preceded by: Lidia Geringer de Oedenberg
- Succeeded by: Monika Beňová

Member of the European Parliament for South East England
- In office 4 June 2009 – 31 January 2020
- Preceded by: The Baroness Nicholson of Winterbourne
- Succeeded by: Constituency abolished

Personal details
- Born: Catherine Zena Bailey; 14 January 1949 (age 77) Broxbourne, Hertfordshire, UK
- Party: Liberal Democrat
- Spouse: Simon Bearder
- Children: 3
- Website: Constituency website Parliament website

Video introduction

Catherine Zena Bearder (née Bailey; born 14 January 1949) is a British Liberal Democrat politician who served as Leader of the Liberal Democrats in the European Parliament between 2 July 2014 and 12 November 2019. She was a Member of the European Parliament (MEP) for South East England from 4 June 2009 to 31 January 2020.

She was elected to the European Parliament in 2009, and re-elected in 2014; and in 2019, when she was placed head of the Liberal Democrat party list: with 25.75% of the vote, it came in second behind the Brexit Party list headed by Nigel Farage.

== Personal life ==
Born in Hertfordshire, she was educated at the independent Hawthorne's School in Frinton on Sea and the independent St Christopher School, Letchworth. She is married to Professor Simon Bearder, a zoologist at Oxford Brookes University. The couple have three sons, Tim, Ian and Peter. Prior to becoming an MEP, she worked as a development officer in a number of major national charities.

== Political career ==
A former Lib Dem councillor in Cherwell and on Oxfordshire County Council, twice European candidate and parliamentary candidate for Banbury in 1997 and Henley in 2001, Bearder has been an active Liberal Democrat for many years. She is also President of the Liberal Democrat European Group (LDEG).

She was the second placed Liberal Democrat candidate for the European Parliament in the South East region of England. Replacing Emma Nicholson MEP, she was placed behind Sharon Bowles MEP on the party list for the 2009 European elections. Bearder was elected to the European Parliament on 4 June 2009, and took her seat on 14 July. In 2014 she was re-elected, as the sole British Liberal Democrat MEP.

Bearder was a member of the European Parliament's Committee on the Environment, Public Health and Food Safety and the Committee on Women's Rights and Gender Equality, where she served as her parliamentary group's coordinator. She focused on environmental issues, especially wildlife conservation and biodiversity, and has founded the cross-party "MEPs for Wildlife group" which is calling for an EU Action Plan against Wildlife Trafficking. She was appointed as one of the lead MEPs working on the revision of the National Emissions Ceiling Directive, which was to set national targets to reduce emissions of harmful pollutants. This formed part of the EU's Clean Air Package, which according to the European Commission could prevent an estimated 38,000 premature deaths a year in the EU by 2030.

Bearder is a longtime campaigner on the issue of human trafficking and was appointed to draft a European Parliament report looking at the implementation of the EU Human Trafficking Directive 2011/36/EU.

Following the 2014 European elections, Bearder was elected as Quaestor of the European Parliament and served from 2014 to 2019. In this capacity, she was also a member of the High-level Group on Gender Equality and Diversity and chairwoman of the Artistic Committee. Her role as quaestor made her part of the Parliament's leadership under President Martin Schulz. In addition to her committee assignments, Bearder was a member of the European Parliament Intergroup on SMEs.

In 2015, the European Parliament approved an amendment introduced by Bearder demanding immediate publication of existing inquiries into member states involvement in secret flights operated by the United States Central Intelligence Agency (CIA) and linked to "enhanced interrogations" conducted outside US territory, in particular the inquiry into UK involvement led by John Chilcot.

Following the 2019 European Parliament elections, Bearder was elected as leader of the Liberal Democrat group.
