= Mia De Vits =

Belgian politician (born 1950)

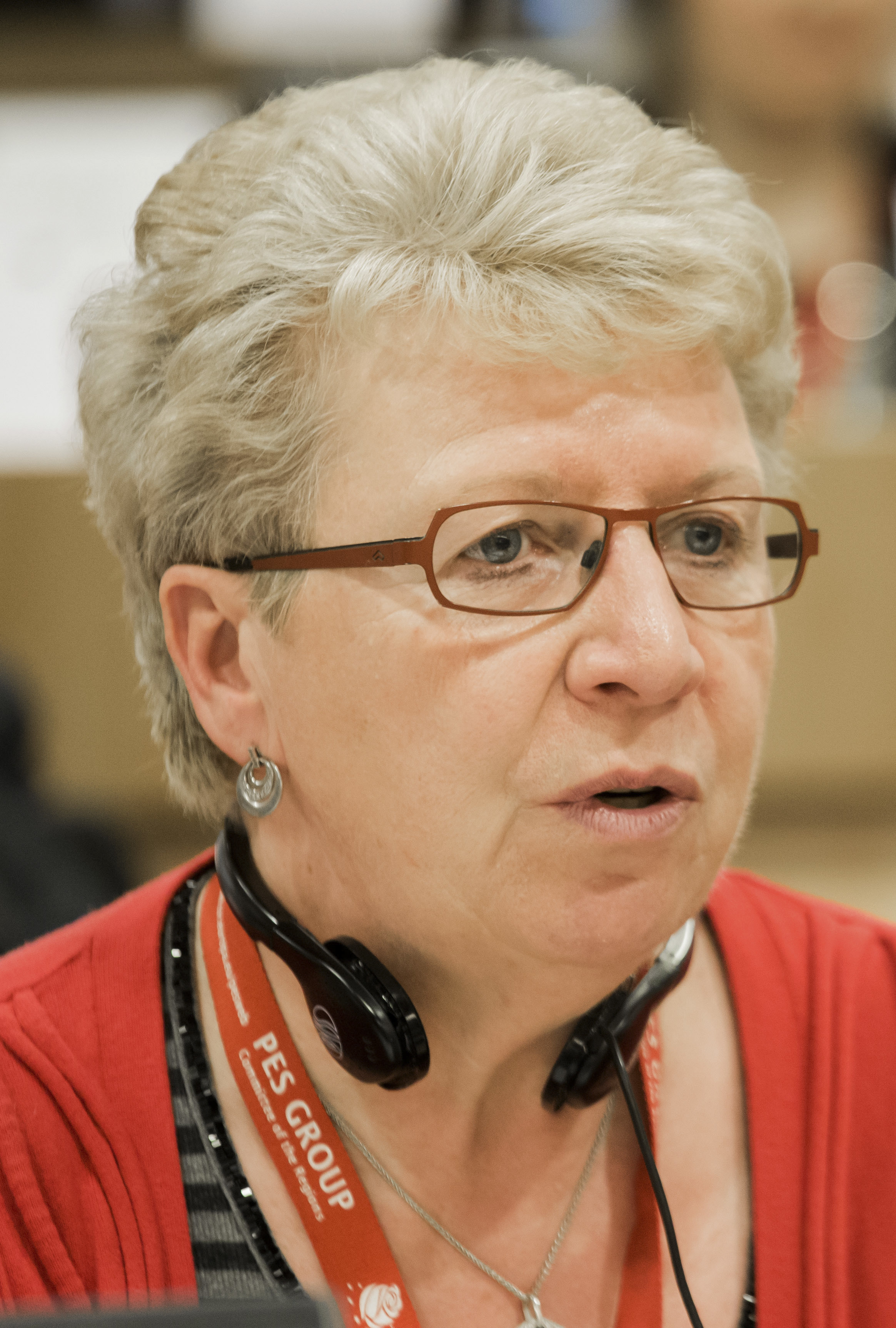
- Born: Marie Louise De Vits; 31 March 1950 (age 75); Gooik, Belgium
- Occupation: politician

Marie Louise "Mia" De Vits (born 31 March 1950) is a Belgian politician.

De Vits started her career with the socialist trade union ABVV in 1973, rising through the ranks to become Secretary-General (1989–2002) and its chairman (2002–2004).

In 2004 De Vits went into elective politics and was elected a Member of the European Parliament (2004–2009) with the Socialistische Partij-Anders, part of the Socialist Group. She sat on the European Parliament's Committee on the Internal Market and Consumer Protection. She was a substitute for the Committee on Economic and Monetary Affairs.

In 2009 she was elected to the Flemish Parliament and served from 2009 to 2014. She retired from politics after the 2014 regional elections.

== Education ==
- 1971: Degree in social sciences

== Career ==
- 1971–1973: Freelance journalist with VRT-TV (Flemish Radio and Television Company)
- 1973–1984: Policy adviser, General Federation of Belgian Labour (ABVV/FGTB)
- 1984–1989: Federal Secretary, ABVV
- 1989–2002: Secretary-General, ABVV
- 2002–2004: Chairwoman of the ABVV
- 1989–2004: Member of the executive board of the International Confederation of Free Trade Unions
- 1989–2004: Member of the executive committee, European Trade Union Confederation
- Member of the Governing Body of the International Labour Organization, Geneva
- 2004–2009: Member of the European Parliament
- 2009–2014: Member of the Flemish Parliament

== See also ==
- 2004 European Parliament election in Belgium
