= Libor Rouček =

Czech politician

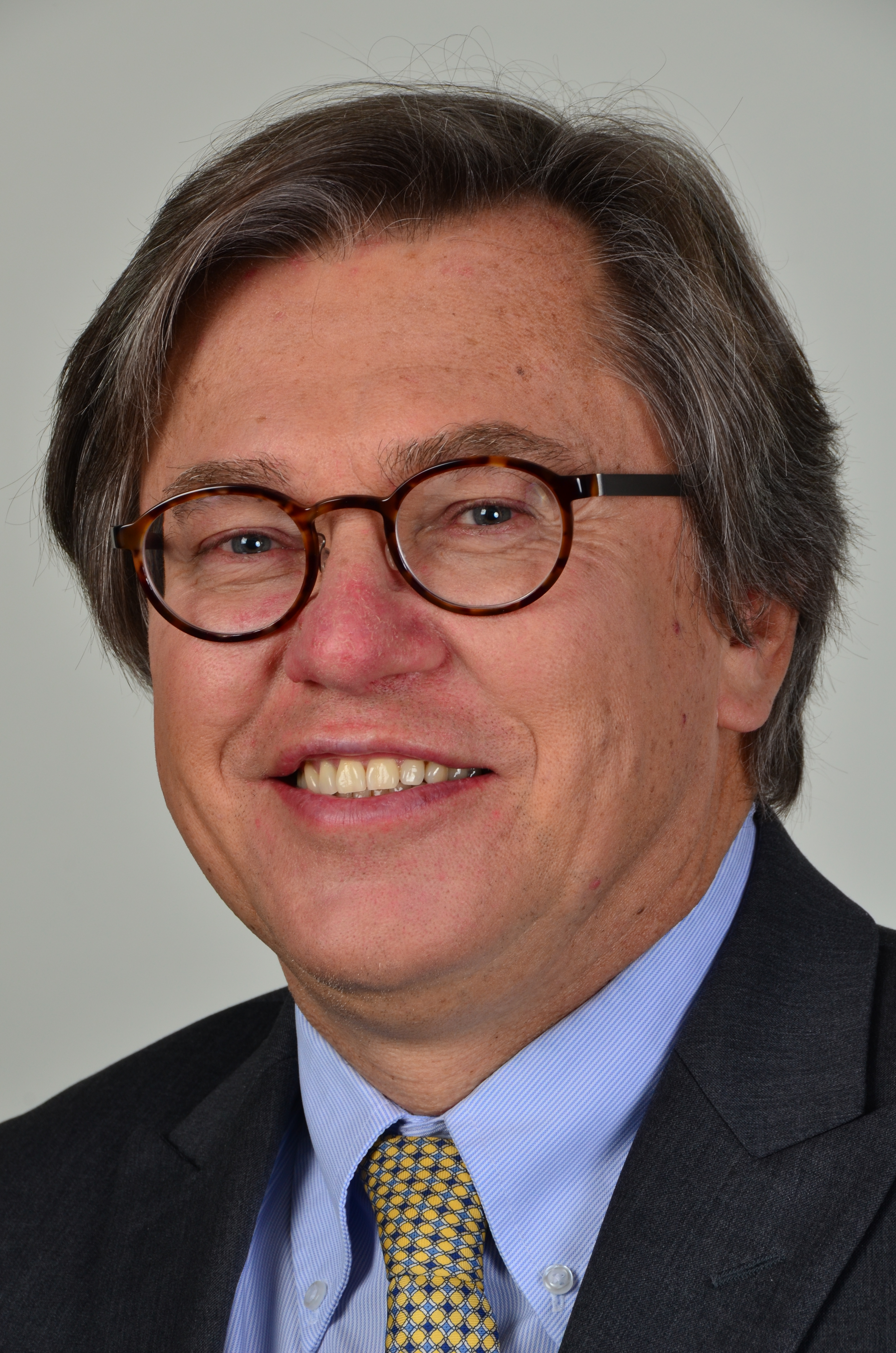
Rouček in February 2014

Libor Rouček (born 4 September 1954 in Kladno) is a Czech politician who was Member of the European Parliament from 2004 to 2014 with the Czech Social Democratic Party. He was a former member of the Chamber of Deputies of the Czech Republic from 2002 to 2004 and spokesperson for the Government of the Czech Republic from 1998 to 2002.

During his tenure in the European Parliament, he was Vice-President of the European Parliament from 2009 to 2012 and vice-president of the Progressive Alliance of Socialists and Democrats from 2012 to 2014. He was first vice-chair of the Foreign Affairs Committee of the European Parliament and member of the Committee on Budgets of the European Parliament between 2004 and 2009. Rouček was furthermore the European Parliament's Rapporteur for the accession process of Croatia from 2012 to 2013, and Rapporteur on Russia from 2013 to 2014.

== Biography ==
Rouček was born in 1954 in Kladno, where he graduated from primary and secondary school. From the age of fifteen, he worked on construction sites and from the age of sixteen at Poldi Steel Works. After graduating high school, he was successively employed as an aircraft loader, mine worker and computer programmer.

In 1977, he emigrated to Austria for political reasons, where he became involved in the Social Democratic movement. From 1978 to 1984, he studied political science and sociology at the University of Vienna. He completed his studies with a doctor’s degree with a specialization in international relations. While studying, he worked in various professions, including as a tile setter, bottle sorter at Coca Cola and waiter. From 1980, he was employed in the documentation and press office at the headquarters of the Social Democratic Party of Austria under Chancellor Bruno Kreisky.

After his studies, he first went to Australia where, among other things, he taught at the University of Sydney. In 1987, he was a fellow at the Smithsonian Institution in Washington, D.C.; a year later, he gave a lecture at the invitation of the Chinese Academy of Sciences in Beijing.

From 1988 to 1991, he was employed as an editor at the Voice of America in Washington, D.C. From 1991 to 1992, he was a research fellow at the Royal Institute of International Affairs in London. In this role, he also provided his expertise to the British Foreign Office and the Foreign Affairs Committee of the Westminster Parliament. After 1993, he worked in Sydney in research on Australian and East Asian markets.

Rouček applied his education, work and life experiences from Austria, the US, Great Britain, and Australia in the preparation of many Czech Social Democratic Party (ČSSD) program documents; after his return from exile, he became the spokesperson of the party. After the victorious parliamentary elections in 1998, he worked 4 years as a spokesman for the Government of the Czech Republic.

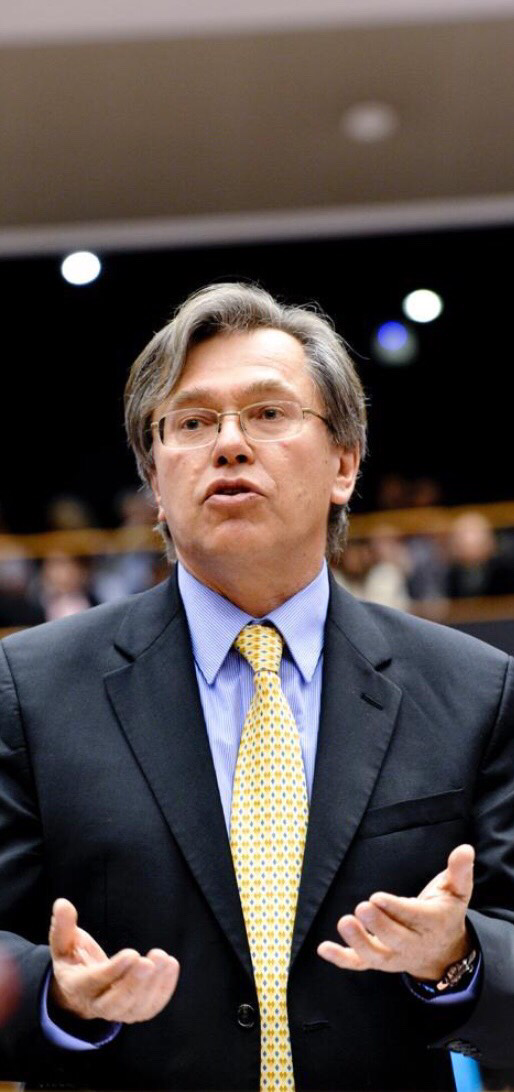
Rouček addressing a session of the European Parliament in Brussels

In 2002, he was elected to the Chamber of Deputies of the Parliament of the Czech Republic where he served as vice-chairman of the Committee on European Integration, vice-chairman of the Foreign Affairs Committee and vice-chairman of the ČSSD Parliamentary Club. From spring 2003, he has served as the head of the ČSSD observer delegation to the European Parliament.

In June 2004, he was elected to the European Parliament, where he worked in the Foreign Affairs Committee from 2004 and became its first Vice-Chair in November 2006. He was also a member of the Committee on Budgets from 2004 to 2009.

He was successfully reelected as MEP in June 2009 and was subsequently elected as Vice-President of the European Parliament on 14 July 2009. In 2012, he was elected vice-president of the Group of European Social Democrats in the European Parliament, responsible for foreign policy. His work included coordinating relations with the US, China, Russia, and Eastern Europe. From 2012 to 2013, he served as the European Parliament's rapporteur for the accession process of Croatia; in 2013, he was named elected as the European Parliament's official rapporteur for EU-Russia relations and to the lllBoard of lllGovernors of the European Endowment for Democracy.

Although he was the highest-ranking Czech Social Democrat in the EU institutions, for the 2014 elections to the European Parliament the ČSSD placed him in an unelectable ninth place on its candidate list, and he thus did not defend his MEP mandate. He then withdrew from active politics altogether.

Rouček described his life's journey in his autobiography entitled Můj a náš příběh (My and Our Story).

== Other activities ==
Since 2015, Rouček has been co-chair of the Czech-German Discussion Forum to promote dialogue between Czechs and Germans.

== Recognition ==
=== Honours & Award ===
- Honorary Order of Georgia (2014)
- Wenzel-Jaksch – Gedächtnispreis (2021)
- Medal of the minister of foreign affairs of the Czech Republic for Distinguished Contribution to Diplomacy (2022)
- Europäischer Karlspreis der Sudetendeutschen Landsmannschaft (2023)

== Bibliography ==
- Die Tschechoslowakei und die Bundesrepublik Deutschland 1949-1989, Tuduv Verlag, München, 1990
- After the Bloc: The New International Relations in Eastern Europe, The Royal Institute of International Affairs, London, 1992
- Malá politologie, Ústav mezinárodních vztahů, Praha,1993
- Můj a náš příběh (My and our story), Academia, 2019
- Numerous articles in professional journals and newspapers, including The World Today, Soviet Studies, Australian Medical Journal, International Politics, Frankfurter Allgemeine Zeitung, Frankfurter Rundschau, Profil, Liberation, Lidové noviny, Právo and others.

== See also ==
- 2004 European Parliament election in the Czech Republic
