= Élisabeth Morin =

French politician (born 1947)

Élisabeth Morin-Chartier
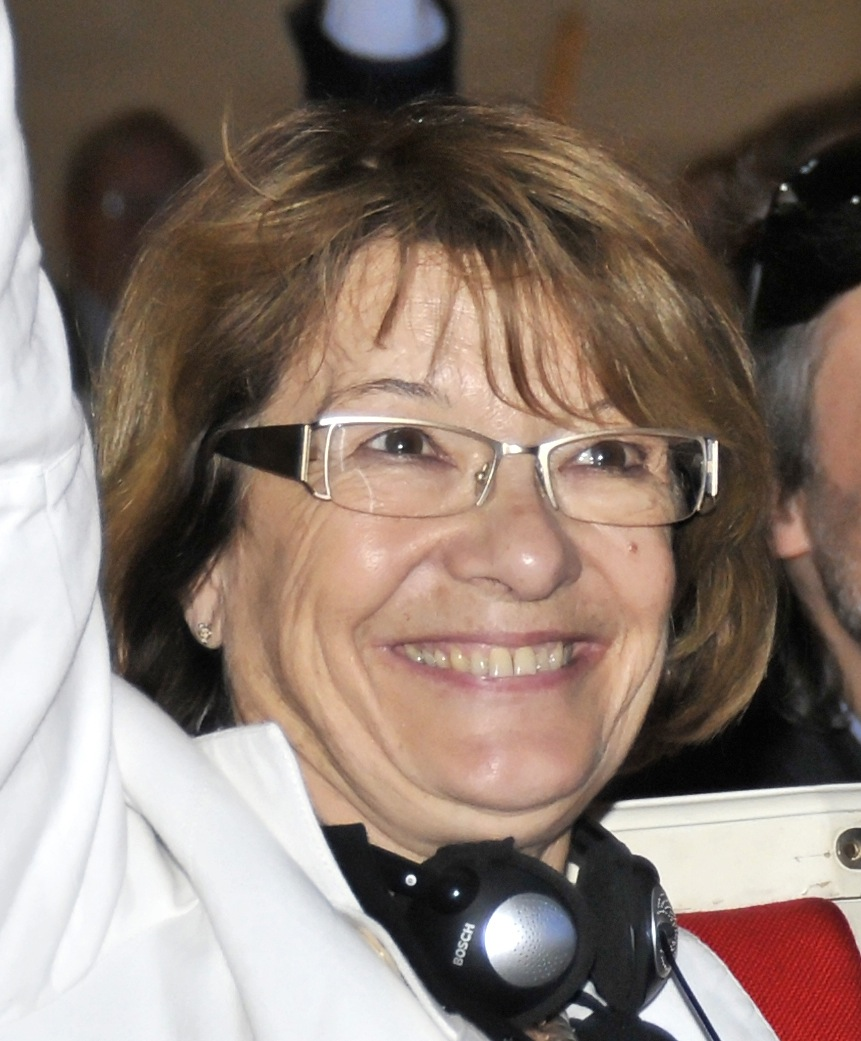

Quaestor of the European Parliament
- In office 2 July 2014 – 2019 Serving with Karol Karski, Andrey Kovatchev, Catherine Bearder, Vladimír Maňka

Member of the European Parliament
- In office 2004–2019

Personal details
- Born: 10 October 1947 (age 79) Ceaux-en-Couhé, France
- Party: French: Union for a Popular Movement (UMP); EU: European People's Party (EPP)

Élisabeth Morin-Chartier (French pronunciation: [elizabɛt mɔʁɛ̃ ʃaʁtje]; born 10 October 1947) is a French politician of the Agir party who served as Member of the European Parliament for the West France constituency from 2009 European election until 2014. Before joining Agir in 2018, she was a member of the Union for a Popular Movement and the Republicans (LR).

== Political career ==
Morin was Vice President of the Poitou-Charentes Regional Council under Regional President Jean-Pierre Raffarin and assumed the presidency upon Raffarin's nomination as Prime Minister of France. Her list in the 2004 regional elections was defeated in a near-landslide by the Socialist list, led by Ségolène Royal.

Morin was also a member of the French Economic and Social Council between September 2004 and May 2007.

=== Member of the European Parliament ===
In the 2004 European election, Morin was the third candidate on Roselyne Bachelot's UMP list in the West but she was not elected. However, when Bachelot entered the François Fillon cabinet in May 2007, she became a Member of the European Parliament. In the 2009 European election, she was the second candidate on the UMP list in the West region and was elected to the European Parliament.

Throughout her time in office, Morin served on the Committee on Employment and Social Affairs. Between 2010 and 2012, she served as Vice Chairwoman of the Committee on Women's Rights and Gender Equality. In addition to her committee assignments, she was a member of the Parliament's delegation for relations with India. She previously served on the delegations with the United States from 2009 to 2014.

Following the 2014 European elections, Morin was elected as quaestor of the European Parliament for two and a half years. In this capacity, she was also a member of the Bureau Working Group on Buildings, Transport and Green Parliament and of the Advisory Committee dealing with Harassment Complaints between Accredited Parliamentary Assistants and Members of the European Parliament and its Prevention at the Workplace. Her role as quaestor made her part of the Parliament's leadership under President Martin Schulz.

On the Committee on Employment and Social Affairs, Morin was one of the Parliament's rapporteurs on a proposed revision of the EU's 1996 directive on posted workers, who are sent by employers to work temporarily in another country. In 2019, she successfully sponsored an amendment saying that Members of the European Parliament "may not be elected as office-holders of Parliament or one of its bodies, be appointed as rapporteur or participate in an official delegation or interinstitutional negotiations", if they have not signed anti-harassment commitments.

Morin was also a member of the European Parliament Intergroup on Trade Unions and the European Parliament Intergroup on Wine, Spirits and Quality Foodstuffs.

In 2016, Morin publicly endorsed Alain Juppé in the Republicans’ primaries for the 2017 presidential elections. In the party's 2017 leadership election, she endorsed Maël de Calan as party president.

== Life after politics ==
Since 2022, Morin has been serving on the European Commission's three-member Independent Ethical Committee.
