= Jan Mulder (politician) =

Dutch politician

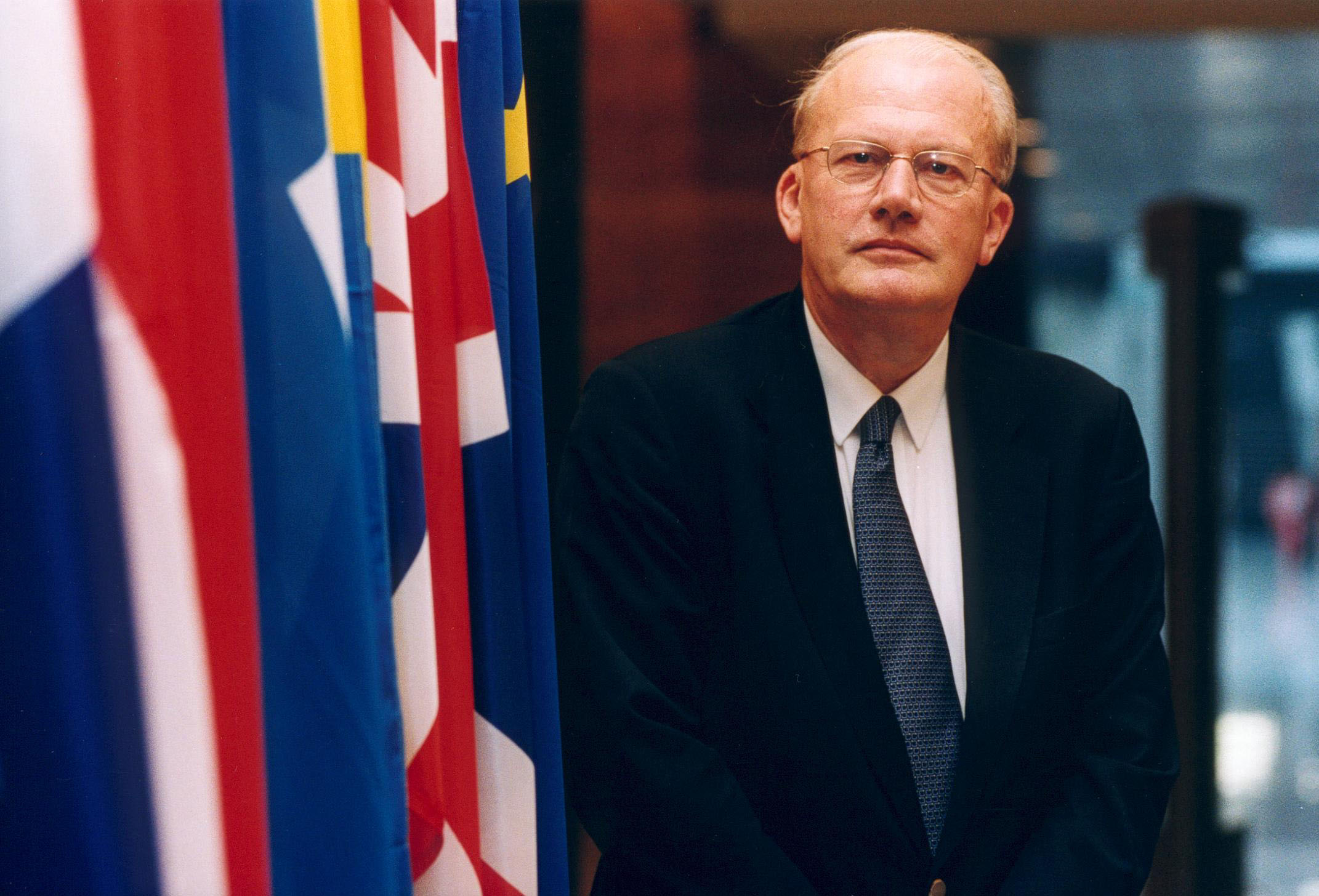
Jan Mulder

Jan Mulder (Dutch pronunciation: [jɑˈmʏldər]; born 3 October 1943 in Diever) is a Dutch politician who served as a Member of the European Parliament (MEP) from 1994 until 2004 and from 2010 until 2014. He is a member of the People's Party for Freedom and Democracy (VVD), a member party of the Alliance of Liberals and Democrats for Europe.

== Political career ==
Mulder served as vice-chair of the European Parliament's Committee on Budgets and its Committee on Budgetary Control. In 2007 he was elected one of the six quaestors of the European Parliament.

He was a substitute for the Committee on Agriculture and Rural Development and the Committee on Fisheries. During the 2009 European Parliament elections, he was not re-elected but in May 2010 he replaced Jeanine Hennis-Plasschaert who was elected in the Dutch parliament.

Mulder is in favour of the European cause and supported the Spinelli Group manifesto.

== Other activities ==
- European Anti-Fraud Office (OLAF), Chairman of the Supervisory Committee

== Education ==
- 1970: Agricultural engineer

== Career timeline ==
- 1970–1975: Assistant FAO expert and subsequently FAO expert in Kenya
- 1975–1976: Official of the Ministry of Foreign Affairs, The Hague
- 1976–1994: Official of the European Commission, Brussels
- 1977–1988: Chairman of the VVD Brussels section
- 1994–2009, 2010–2014: Member of the European Parliament

== See also ==
- 2004 European Parliament election in the Netherlands
