= Fabienne Keller =

French politician (born 1959)

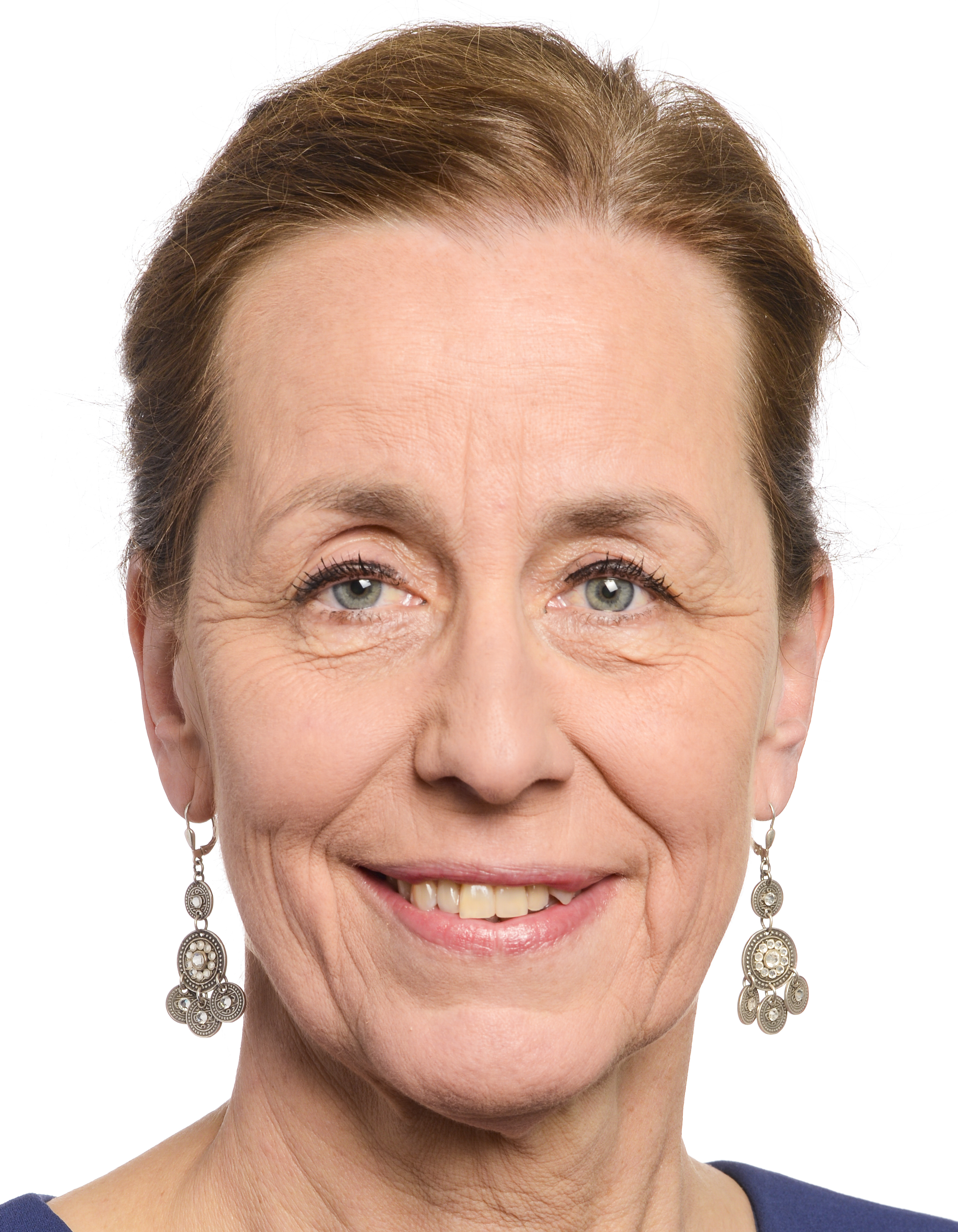

Quaestor of the European Parliament
- Incumbent
- Assumed office 20 January 2022 Serving with See List

Member of the European Parliament for France
- Incumbent
- Assumed office 2 July 2019
- In office 17 June 2002 – 2 July 2002
- Succeeded by: Nicole Fontaine

Member of the French Senate for Bas-Rhin
- In office 21 February 2005 – 23 June 2019
- In office 1 October 2004 – 26 November 2004

Mayor of Strasbourg
- In office 19 March 2001 – 22 March 2008
- Preceded by: Catherine Trautmann
- Succeeded by: Roland Ries

Member of the Bas-Rhin's Departmental council for Canton of Strasbourg-8
- In office 29 March 1992 – 18 March 2001

Personal details
- Born: 20 October 1959 (age 66) Sélestat, Bas-Rhin, France
- Party: Renaissance
- Education: Lycée Kléber
- Alma mater: École Polytechnique

Fabienne Keller (born 20 October 1959) is a French politician who has been serving as a Member of the European Parliament since 2019. She was previously the mayor (UDF) of Strasbourg, France, from March 2001 to March 2008.

== Education ==
Keller studied at the École Polytechnique (X 1979) and the National School of Rural Engineering, Water and Forestry. She also graduated with a Masters in Economics from Berkeley. Keller undertook military service in the French Navy, at the Mediterranean Maritime Prefecture in Toulon. She remains a reserve corvette captain.

== Early career ==
Keller began her career at the Ministry of Agriculture between 1985 and 1988 and was responsible for the management of the French cereal market, moving on to the Ministry of Finance (Treasury Department), where she was responsible for funding agriculture and fisheries.

In 1989, Keller was appointed CEO to the CIAL bank (Crédit Industriel d'Alsace Lorraine), and then, in 1996, General Manager of Crédit Commercial de France (CCF), which she left in 2001, the year of her election as mayor of Strasbourg.

== Political career ==
=== Career in national politics ===
In addition to her work in local politics, Keller served on the Senate from 2005 until 2019. In this capacity, she made headlines when she voted against her party's line and supported 2013 legislation introducing same-sex marriage in France. She also wrote a 2018 report about congestion pricing in London and Stockholm, which formed the basis for legislation making it easier for cities to introduce congestion pricing in a bid to reduce traffic jams and air pollution.

In the Republicans' 2016 presidential primaries, Keller endorsed Alain Juppé as the party's candidate for the office of President of France. In November 2017, she co-founded Agir. Under the leadership of party chairman Franck Riester, she has since been serving as deputy chair alongside Frédéric Lefebvre, Laure de La Raudière and Claude Malhuret. She eventually left The Republicans in early 2018.

=== Member of the European Parliament, 2019–present ===
Since becoming a Member of the European Parliament, Keller has been serving on the Committee on Civil Liberties, Justice and Home Affairs. In addition to her committee assignments, she is part of the Parliament's delegations for relations with the Mashreq countries and to the Parliamentary Assembly of the Union for the Mediterranean. She is also a member of the European Parliament Intergroup on Children's Rights, the URBAN Intergroup and the MEPs Against Cancer group.

In 2022, Keller became a quaestor of the European Parliament, making her part of the Parliament's leadership under President Roberta Metsola. On 17 September, Agir merged into La Republique en Marche as it reformed and rebranded under the name Renaissance, which she joined.

Following the 2024 European Parliament election in France, she retained her seat.

== Other activities ==
- French Office for the Protection of Refugees and Stateless Persons (OFPRA), Member of the Board of Directors
- French Development Agency (AFD), Member of the Board of Directors
- Haute école des arts du Rhin (HEAR), Member of the Board of Director
- Robert Schuman Foundation, Member of the Board of Directors
