= Astrid Lulling =

Luxembourgish politician (born 1929)

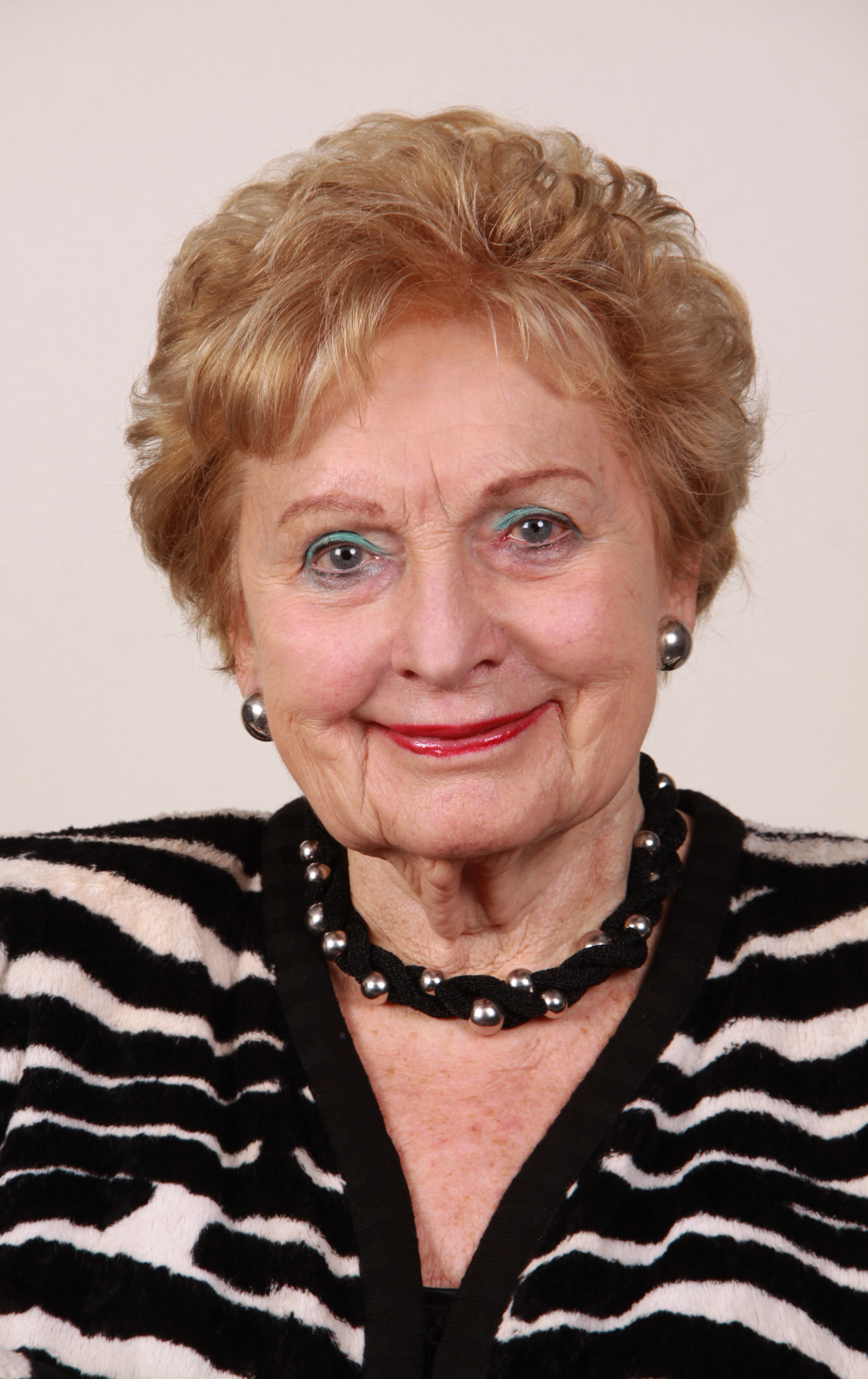
Astrid Lulling

Astrid Huna Lulling (born 11 June 1929 in Schifflange) is a Luxembourgish politician. She was a Member of the European Parliament (1965–1974 and 1989–2014) for the Christian Social People's Party, part of the European People's Party.

== Positions held ==
- Member of the Parliament's Bureau.
- Member of the Quaestors.
- Member of the Committee on Economic and Monetary Affairs.
- Member of the Committee on Women's Rights and Gender Equality.
- Member of the Delegation for relations with the countries of Central America.
- Member of the Delegation to the Euro-Latin American Parliamentary Assembly.
- Substitute of the Committee on Agriculture and Rural Development.
- Substitute of the Delegation for relations with the countries of Southeast Asia and the Association of Southeast Asian Nations (ASEAN).

== Curriculum vitae ==
- Studied political economy at the University of Saarbrücken (1953–1955).
- Secretary and editor of the Luxembourg Workers' Union (1949–1963).
- Worked for the Miners and Metalworkers Contact Office with the ECSC, Luxembourg (1950–1958).
- Chairwoman of Socialist Women, Luxembourg Socialist Workers' Party (1963–1971).
- Member of the Social Democratic Party (PSD) executive committee (1971–1982).
- Member and vice-chairwoman of the Luxembourg-Centre section of the PCS (1984–2004).
- Member of the National Christian Social Women's Committee (since 1984).
- Secretary-General of the Unions of Agricultural Workers and of Food Industry Workers, at the European Community Trade Union Secretariat in Brussels (1963–1971).
- Member of Schifflange communal council (1970–2000).
- Mayor of Schifflange (1970–1985).
- Chairwoman of the PSD parliamentary group in the Chamber of Deputies (1974–1979).
- Member of the Bureau of the Chamber of Deputies (1984–1988).
- Member of the Consumers' Consultative Committee, European Commission (1974–1982).
- Member of the European Parliament (1965–1974 and 1989–2014).

== Decorations ==
- Commander of the Order of Merit of the Republic (Italy)
- Grand Officer of the Order of Merit of the Grand Duchy of Luxembourg (Luxembourg)
- Grand Officer of the Order of the Oak Crown (Luxembourg)

== Other information ==
- Lulling is the author with her grand nephew Jerome of a Luxembourgish video course for foreigners interested in the Luxembourg national language.
- One of her former assistants, Christophe Hansen became an MEP in 2018 and is Luxembourg's nominee for European commissioner in the Second Von Der Leyen Commission.
