= Jiří Maštálka =

Czech politician and physician (born 1956)

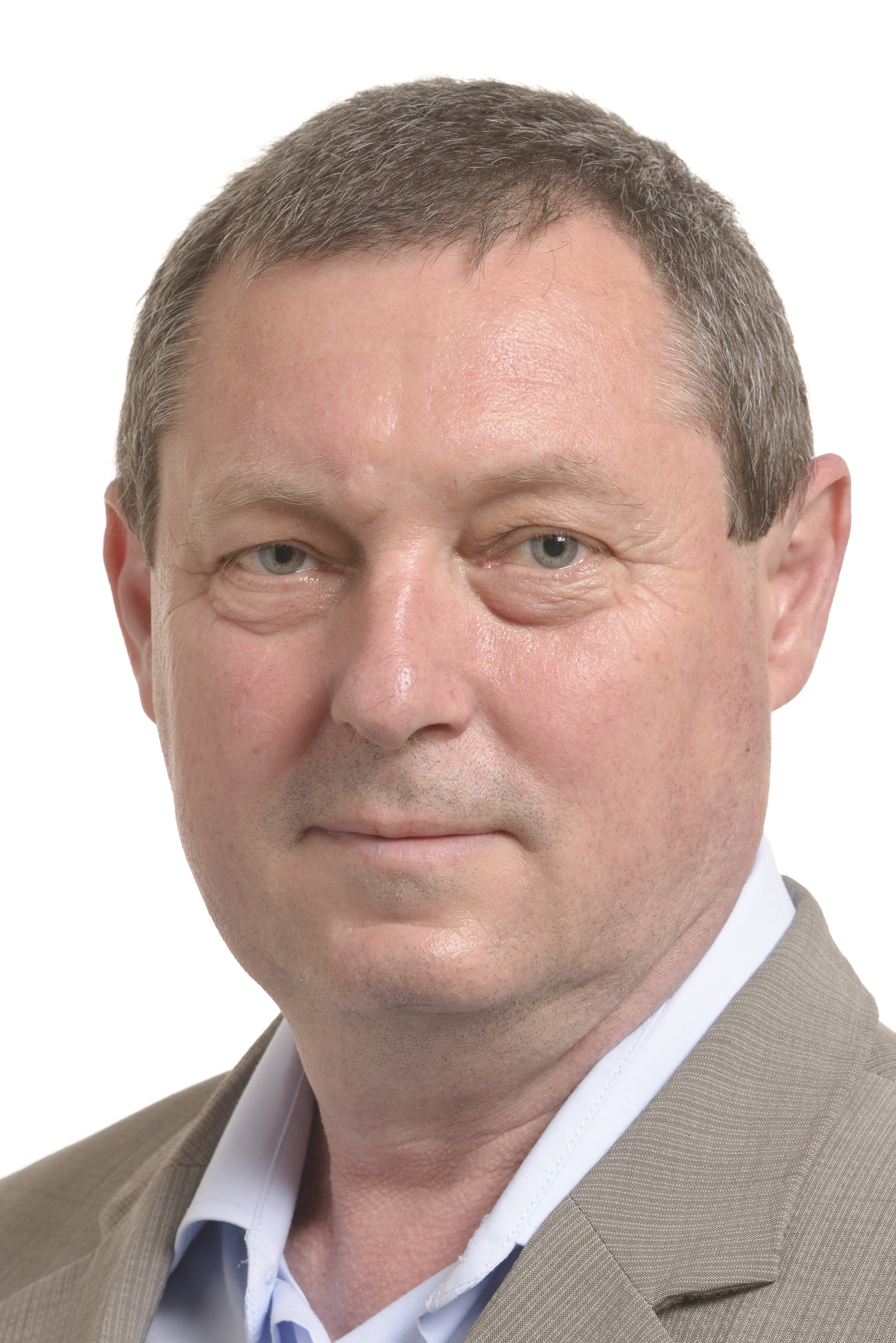

Member of the European Parliament for Czech Republic
- In office 1 May 2004 – 1 June 2019

Personal details
- Born: 3 January 1956 (age 70) Sušice, Czechoslovakia
- Party: KSČ (1977-1990); KSČM (1990–present)

Jiří Maštálka (born 3 January 1956) is a Czech politician and physician who served as a Member of the European Parliament for the Communist Party of Bohemia and Moravia; part of the European United Left–Nordic Green Left party group in the European Parliament.

In March 2016, he received the Russian Order of Friendship from President Vladimir Putin for great contribution to strengthening the friendship and cooperation with the Russian Federation.
