= Lidia Geringer de Oedenberg =

Polish politician (born 1957)

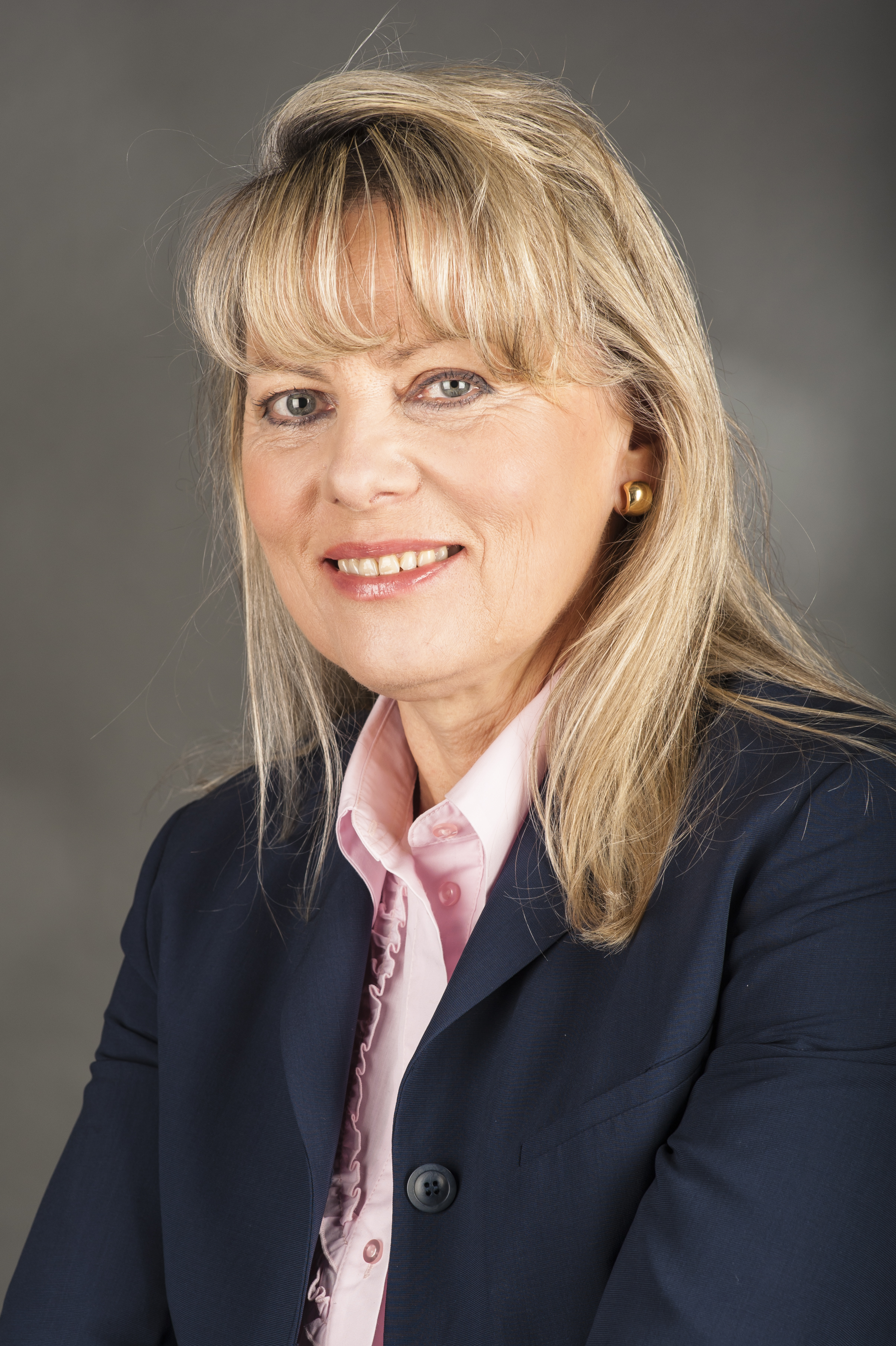
- Geringer de Oedenberg in 2014

Member of the European Parliament for Lower Silesian and Opole
- In office 20 July 2004 – 1 June 2019

Personal details
- Born: 12 September 1957 (age 68) Wrocław, Poland
- Party: Democratic Left Alliance (Since 2004) Progressive Alliance of Socialists and Democrats (Since 2004)

Lidia Joanna Geringer de Oedenberg (born 12 September 1957 in Wrocław, Poland) is a Polish politician and Member of the European Parliament for the DS & OP with the Democratic Left Alliance-Labor Union, part of the Socialist Group. Her family name is Ulatowska, which she has changed after marriage with her husband.

== Education ==
- 1981: Master of Economics, Economics Academy, Wrocław, Department of Administration and Information Sciences, Economic Cybernetics and Statistics studies
- 1997: Marketing Studies in Culture at the World Economy Institute, Warsaw School of Economics
- 1999: French Institute of Administration in Warsaw
- 2001: Advanced diploma of proficiency in the French language - DALF

== Career ==
- 1995-1997: Editorial staff at Polish Television S.A (1989-2001), journalist on the weekly 'Wiadomości Kulturalne'
- since 1996: General director of the International Festival of Culture 'Wratislavia Cantans'
- 2000-2003: Member of the European Festivals Association (EFA) board in Geneva (1997-2000), Chairman of the EFA Marketing Committee
- 2000-2002: Commissioner for Music of the Europalia Polska festival
- since 2001: General director of the Wrocław Philharmonic
- Programme director for Polish Television S.A
- 2001: Wrocław branch
- Vice-Chairman of the Polish Television S.A
- since 2004: Programme Council in Wrocław
- since 2004: Member of the European Parliament; Vice-Chairwoman of the Committee on Legal Affairs (2006-2009); member of the Committees on Rural Development, Budgets, Women's Rights and Gender Equality, and Petitions (2004-2009).
- somce 2006: Member of the Democratic Left Alliance (SLD) party
- since 2008: Member of the National Council of the SLD
- 2009: Re-elected as Member of the European Parliament. Elected to the position of Quaestor of the European Parliament and Member of the European Parliament Bureau; Member of the Committee on Legal Affairs; member of the Committees on Petitions; Substitute-Member in the Committee on Budgets.
- 2012: Re-elected to a second term as Quaestor of the European Parliament and Member of the Parliament Bureau.

== European Parliament ==
Lidia Geringer de Oedenberg's current activities in the European Parliament include her position as a Quaestor to the European Parliament, as well as her membership in the Committee on Legal Affairs, the Committee on Petitions, and the Delegation for relations with the countries of South Asia. She is also a substitute for the Committee on Budgets, the Delegation to the EU-Croatia Joint Parliamentary Committee, the Delegation to the ACP-EU Joint Parliamentary Assembly, and the Delegation to the Parliamentary Assembly of the Union for the Mediterranean.

== Activism ==
Single Seat

Lidia Geringer de Oedenberg is a member of the Pro-Single Seat MEP Alliance in the European Parliament. Along with other members of the Alliance, she has been active raising awareness to the high budgetary and environmental costs of maintaining three working places for the European Parliament. In several publications and media appearances she pointed out to the infrastructure problems of the other two seats in Strasbourg and Luxembourg City, while emphasizing that Brussels should be the home of the European Parliament.

Gender issues

Female entrepreneurship, gender equality in boardrooms and equal representation of women in public life are several themes Lidia Geringer de Oedenberg has voiced her support to. Moreover, Lidia Geringer de Oedenberg has taken an active position in the fight against domestic violence. In September 2012 she participated in the Peace One Day Campaign Global Coalition to reduce domestic violence.

ACTA

Geringer de Oedenberg has been critical about the overall necessity of the Anti-Counterfeiting Trade Agreement (ACTA), as well as the way it has been negotiated. In various articles and media appearances she pointed out to the lack of transparency in the negotiations process, as well as to the vague nature of the text which leaves space for misinterpretation. She also raised her concerns about the possible conflict between ACTA and EU law and possible impact of the agreement on EU citizens and private consumers. After the rejection of ACTA by the European Parliament on 4 July 2012, Lidia Geringer posted on her blog "I welcome the result of the vote and personally think it truly represents the millions of people who took over the streets in the last months, protesting against the agreement".

Famagusta

In 2007 Geringer de Oedenberg visited Famagusta during a fact-finding delegation organized by the Committee on Petitions. Since that visit she has been actively calling for the opening of the seized parts of Famagusta and return of Famagusta's lawful inhabitants. She was one of the authors of a Written Declaration on Famagusta which was adopted by the European Parliament on 14 February 2012.

Tibet

Lidia Geringer de Oedenberg is the Vice President of the European Parliament Intergroup on Tibet. She initiated and participated in various initiatives aiming to raise awareness to the issue of Tibet in the European Institutions.

== Awards and Distinctions ==
- Primus Inter Pares award, Warsaw (1978-1979).
- Special economics award from the Scientific Secretary of the Polish Academy of Sciences (Warsaw, 1980).
- Prize and medal awarded by the Provincial Governor in Wrocław (1996, 1997).
- Wrocław Music Prize 2000/2001 and 2002/2003 ('Wratislavia Cantans').
- 2002 Lower Silesia Diamond Prize (for Wrocław Philharmonic).
- Ministry of Culture awards: Meritorious Cultural Worker Decoration in 2004 and Gloria Artis medal in 2005.
- Polish Association for the Blind Gold Badge of Honour 2008.
- Polish Pensioners' Association Gold Badge of Honour 2008.
- LWP Cross awarded by the Association of Soldiers of the People's Army of Poland (LWP) in 2008.
- Nominated for the Polityka Passport award for culture in 1998.
- Shortlisted for the MEP Awards 2008 in the Campaigner of the Year category.
- Best Polish MEP during the sixth parliamentary term, according to the 2009 rankings compiled by the Kościuszko Institute and the Institute for Public Affairs and the Institute of Political Science at Wrocław University.
- 2010: Primus award for Politics, granted by the Polish weekly newspaper to the best MEPs in the first year of the seventh Parliamentary legislator of 2009–2014.
- 2010: Golden Sphere award granted by Wroclaw's Economic Organization.
- 2010: The Most Powerful Woman in Lower Silesia award granted by the Polska Times Gazeta Wrocławska.
- 2010: Order for Service awarded by the Polish Society of War Veterans.
- 2011: Voted the Person of the Decade in Lower Silesia by the readers of the Polska Times Gazeta Wroclawska.

== See also ==
- 2004 European Parliament election in Poland
