= Ninth European Parliament =

Session of the European Parliament from 2019 to 2024

9th European Parliament
- 2 July 2019 – 15 July 2024
- President (1st Half): (Italy) David Sassoli (S&D) (Malta) Roberta Metsola (EPP) (acting)
- President (2nd Half): (Malta) Roberta Metsola (EPP)
- Vice-Presidents: First Vice-President: 1st Half: (Republic of Ireland) Mairead McGuinness (EPP) (until 12 October 2020); (Malta) Roberta Metsola (EPP) (from 12 November 2020); 2nd Half: (Austria) Othmar Karas (EPP); Other Vice-Presidents: See List
- Commission: Juncker (until 30 November 2019) von der Leyen I (from 1 December 2019)
- Political groups: EPP Group (177); S&D (140); Renew (102); Greens/EFA (72); ECR (68); ID (59); The Left (37); NI (50)
- MEPs: 705
- Elections: May 2019 (Union)
- Treaty on European Union; Treaty on the Functioning of the European Union (Note: The Treaty of Rome and the Treaty of Maastricht as amended by the Treaty of Lisbon and all preceding amending treaties.)
- Website: Official website

The ninth European Parliament was elected during the 2019 elections and sat until the tenth European Parliament was sworn in on 16 July 2024.

== Major events ==
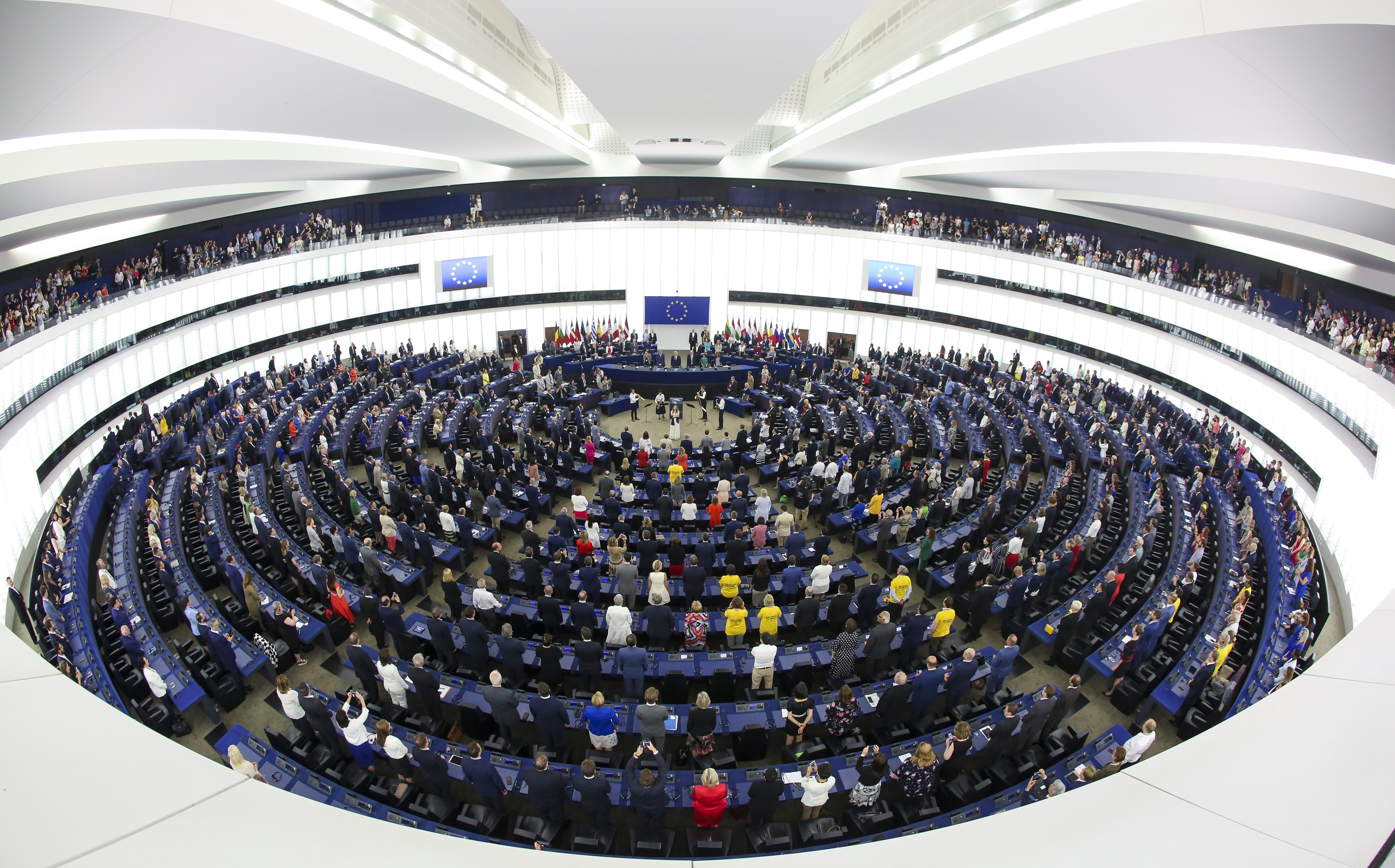
The 9th European Parliament's constitutive session, Strasbourg (2 July 2019)

- 23–26 May 2019
  - Elections to the 9th European Parliament.
    - EPP (182 seats), S&D (154), RE (108), Greens/EFA (74), ID (73), ECR (62), GUE/NGL (41), others (54).
- 2 July 2019
  - First Session (constitutive session) of the 9th Parliament.
    - Presiding officer (under Article 14(2) of the Rules): Antonio Tajani (EPP) of Italy, President of the Eighth Parliament.
- 3 July 2019
  - Election of the President and Vice-Presidents of Parliament for the first half of the parliamentary term.
    - David Sassoli (S&D) of Italy is elected president, Mairead McGuinness (EPP) of Ireland is elected First Vice-President.
- 16 July 2019
  - Vote on 3 July 2019 EUCO proposal for President of the European Commission.
    - Ursula von der Leyen (EPP) of Germany is elected President of the European Commission.
- 30 September-8 October 2019
  - Hearings of candidates for European Commissioners.
  - Additional hearings, if needed, would take place on 14 and 15 October 2019.
- 31 October 2019 (postponed)
  - Original scheduled date for the United Kingdom to withdraw from the European Union, but has been agreed to be postponed for 3 months.
  - As Brexit is further postponed, the UK will have to nominate a candidate for a European Commissioner.
- 27 November 2019
  - Confirmation vote on the Von der Leyen Commission.
- 1 December 2019
  - New European Commission takes office.
- 31 January 2020
  - The United Kingdom withdrew from the European Union, subsequently resulting in a reduction in the number of seats in the European Parliament from 751 to 705.
- 12 November 2020
  - Roberta Metsola (EPP) of Malta is elected First Vice-President, replacing Mairead McGuinness who has taken the role of European Commissioner.
- 16 December 2020
  - Approval of the seven-year budget 2021-2027 of the EU. Decision on keeping an eye on how Next Generation EU funds are spent.
- 11 January 2022
  - Death in office of President David Sassoli.
  - First Vice-President Roberta Metsola takes the role of Acting President of the European Parliament till the election of a new president.
- 18 January 2022
  - Election of the President and Vice-Presidents of Parliament for the second half of the parliamentary term.
    - Roberta Metsola (EPP) of Malta is elected president, Othmar Karas (EPP) of Austria is elected First Vice-President

== Leadership ==
The President of the European Parliament is chosen through the votes of Members of the European Parliament (MEPs) and serves a term lasting 2.5 years, with the option for re-election. The responsibilities of the president encompass a diverse array of functions, including presiding over debates and representing the European Parliament in its interactions with other institutions within the European Union.
Fourteen Vice Presidents are elected through a single ballot process, requiring an absolute majority of cast votes for their selection. In situations where the number of successful candidates falls below 14, a second round of voting is conducted to allocate the remaining positions following identical conditions. Should a third round of voting become necessary, a simple majority suffices to occupy the remaining seats. The precedence of Vice Presidents is established by the order in which they are elected, and in cases of a tie, seniority is determined by age. During each round of voting, MEPs have the capacity to cast votes for as many candidates as there are available seats for that particular round. However, they are obligated to vote for more than half of the total positions to be filled.

=== First Half ===
President: David Sassoli
Vice Presidents:

- Mairead McGuinness
- Rainer Wieland
- Othmar Karas
- Ewa Kopacz
- Lívia Járóka
- Pedro Silva Pereira
- Katarina Barley
- Klára Dobrev
- Dita Charanzová
- Nicola Beer
- Heidi Hautala
- Marcel Kolaja
- Dimitrios Papadimoulis
- Fabio Massimo Castaldo

=== Second Half ===
President: Roberta Metsola
Vice Presidents

- Othmar Karas
- Ewa Kopacz
- Rainer Wieland
- Pina Picierno
- Pedro Silva Pereira
- Eva Kaili
- Evelyn Regner
- Katarina Barley
- Dita Charanzová
- Michal Šimečka
- Nicola Beer
- Roberts Zīle
- Dimitrios Papadimoulis
- Heidi Hautala

=== Elections of the Quaestors ===
==== 4 July 2019 election ====
The five Quaestors were chosen by acclamation.

Candidate		Group	Votes
Anne Sander	FRA	EPP	407
Monika Beňová	SVK	S&D	391
David Casa	MLT	EPP	391
Gilles Boyer	FRA	RE	317
Karol Karski	POL	ECR	261
Source: European Parliament News

==== 20 January 2022 election ====
Four Quaestors were elected on the first round of voting, with the fifth being elected on the second round of voting.

Candidate		Group	Remote Votes	
Candidate		Group	1st Round	2nd Round
Anne Sander	FRA	EPP	622	
Christophe Hansen	LUX	EPP	576	
Monika Beňová	SVK	S&D	487	
Fabienne Keller	FRA	RE	479	
Marcel Kolaja	CZE	G/EFA	277	344
Karol Karski	POL	ECR	321	324
Votes cast			676	668
Votes needed for election			339	335
Blank or void			12	n/a
Voted			688	n/a
Source: European Parliament News

== Political groups and parties ==
The 705 seats after the UK left by their representation

The 751 seats before the UK left by their representation

There were 7 political groups in the parliament, one fewer than the previous parliament. Each MEP could belong to only one group. Political groups could be founded by at least 25 MEPs which came from at least one quarter of all EU member states (namely seven).

=== Situation before and after Brexit ===
Political group and affiliated European political parties		MEPs		
Political group and affiliated European political parties		Pre-Brexit	Post-Brexit	
EPP	Group of the European People's Party: European People's Party	182 / 751	187 / 705	▲5
EPP	Group of the European People's Party: European People's Party	24.23%	26.52%	▲2.29%
S&D	Group of the Progressive Alliance of Socialists and Democrats in the European Parliament: Party of European Socialists	154 / 751	147 / 705	▼7
S&D	Group of the Progressive Alliance of Socialists and Democrats in the European Parliament: Party of European Socialists	20.24%	20.99%	▲0.75%
Renew	Renew Europe Group: Alliance of Liberals and Democrats for Europe Party; European Democratic Party	108 / 751	98 / 705	▼10
Renew	Renew Europe Group: Alliance of Liberals and Democrats for Europe Party; European Democratic Party	14.38%	13.76%	▼0.62%
ID	Identity and Democracy Group: Identity and Democracy Party	73 / 751	76 / 705	▲3
ID	Identity and Democracy Group: Identity and Democracy Party	9.72%	10.78%	▲1.06%
G/EFA	Group of the Greens/European Free Alliance: European Green Party; European Free Alliance; European Pirate Party; Volt Europa	74 / 751	67 / 705	▼7
G/EFA	Group of the Greens/European Free Alliance: European Green Party; European Free Alliance; European Pirate Party; Volt Europa	9.84%	9.50%	▼0.34%
ECR	European Conservatives and Reformists: European Conservatives and Reformists Party; European Christian Political Movement	62 / 751	61 / 705	▼1
ECR	European Conservatives and Reformists: European Conservatives and Reformists Party; European Christian Political Movement	8.26%	8.79%	▲0.53%
GUE/NGL	The Left in the European Parliament: Party of the European Left; Nordic Green Left Alliance; Now the People; Animal Politics EU	41 / 751	39 / 705	▼2
GUE/NGL	The Left in the European Parliament: Party of the European Left; Nordic Green Left Alliance; Now the People; Animal Politics EU	5.46%	5.67%	▲0.21%
NI	Non-Inscrits: European Alliance for Freedom and Democracy; Alliance for Peace and Freedom; Initiative of Communist and Workers' Parties	54 / 751	29 / 705	▼25
NI	Non-Inscrits: European Alliance for Freedom and Democracy; Alliance for Peace and Freedom; Initiative of Communist and Workers' Parties	7.19%	3.33%	▼3.86%
Vacant		4	1	▼46
Source for MEPs: Seats by Member State				▼46

== Members ==
Political groups by member states

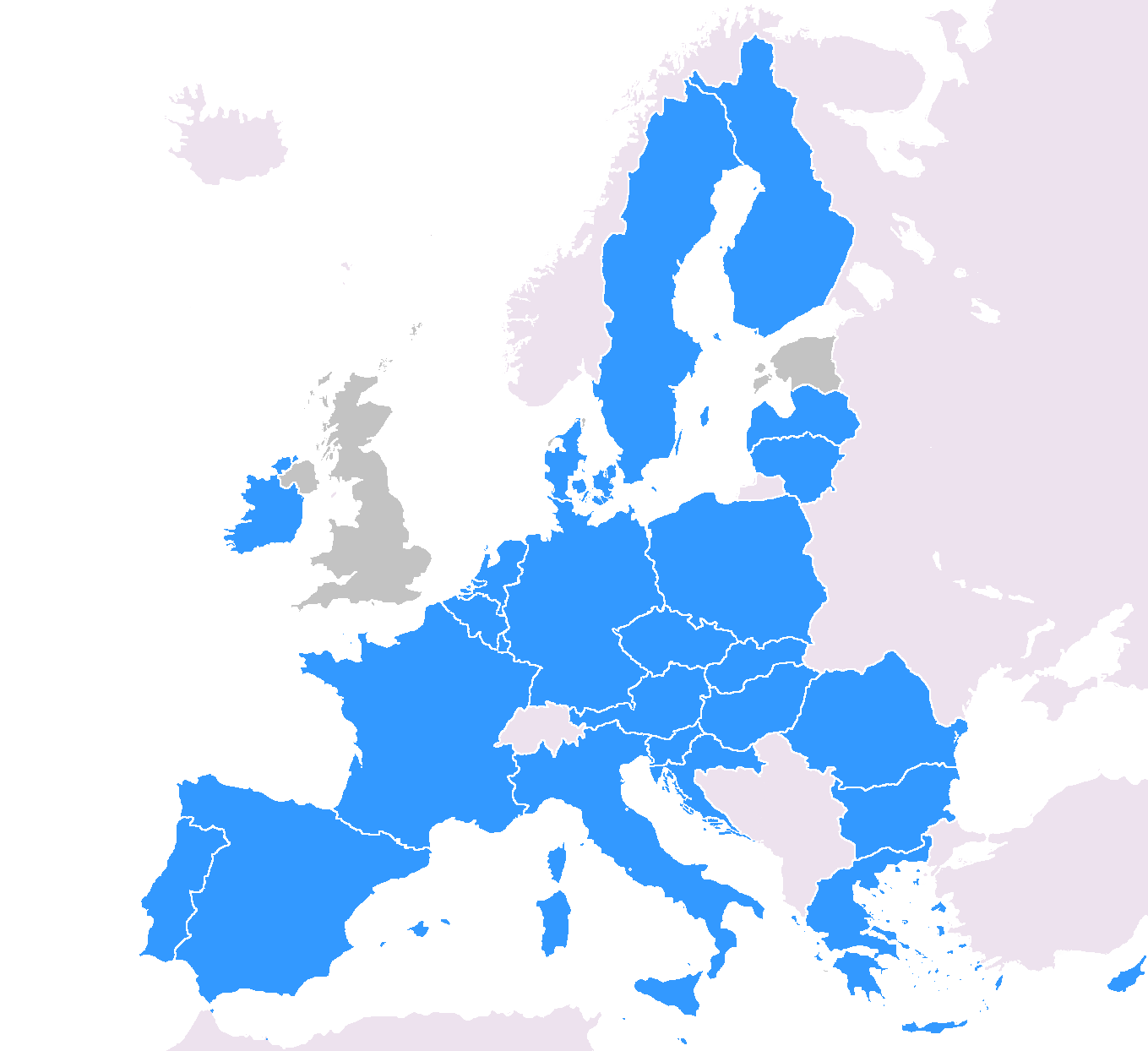
Group of the European People's Party

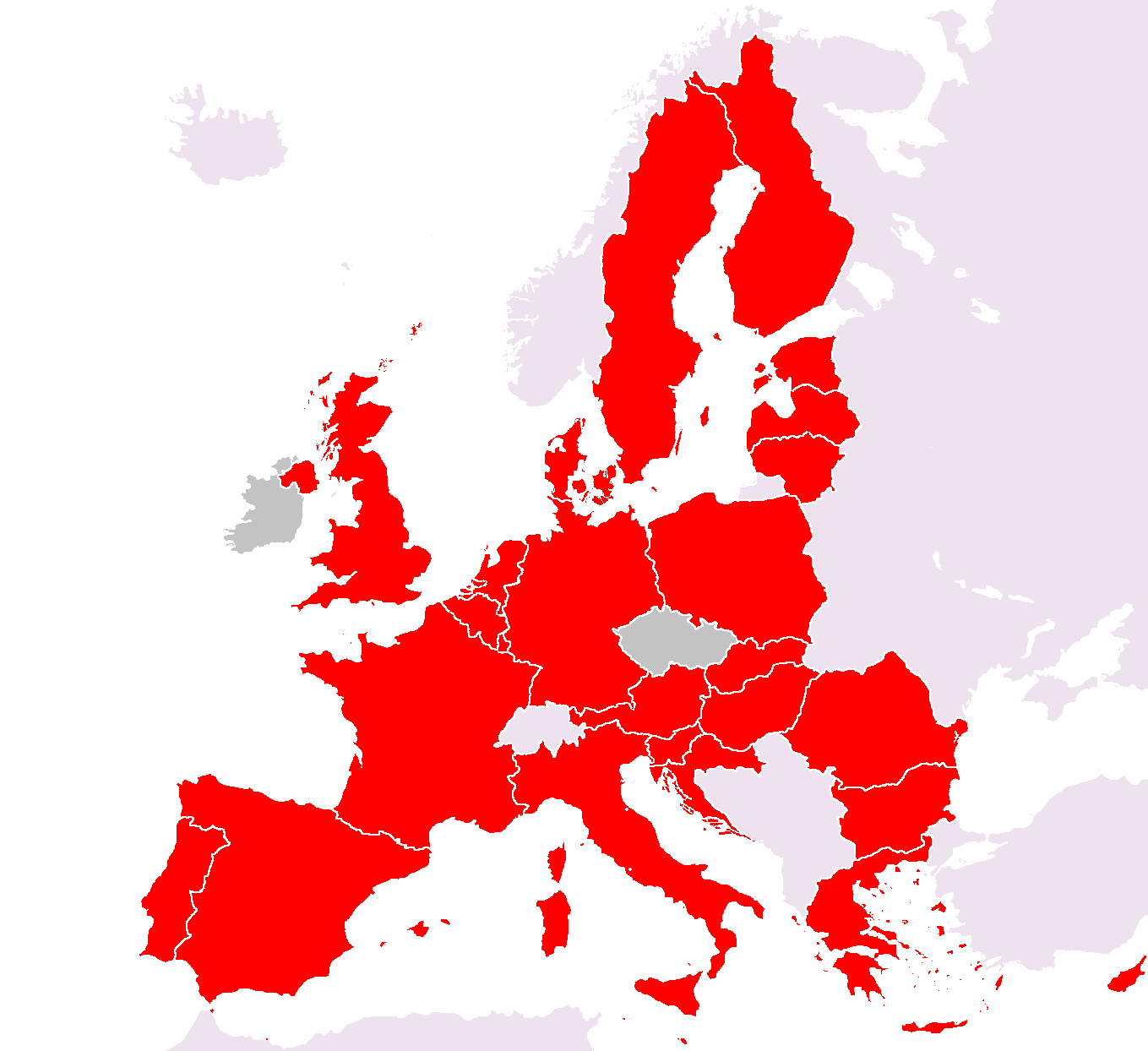
Group of the Progressive Alliance of Socialists and Democrats in the European Parliament

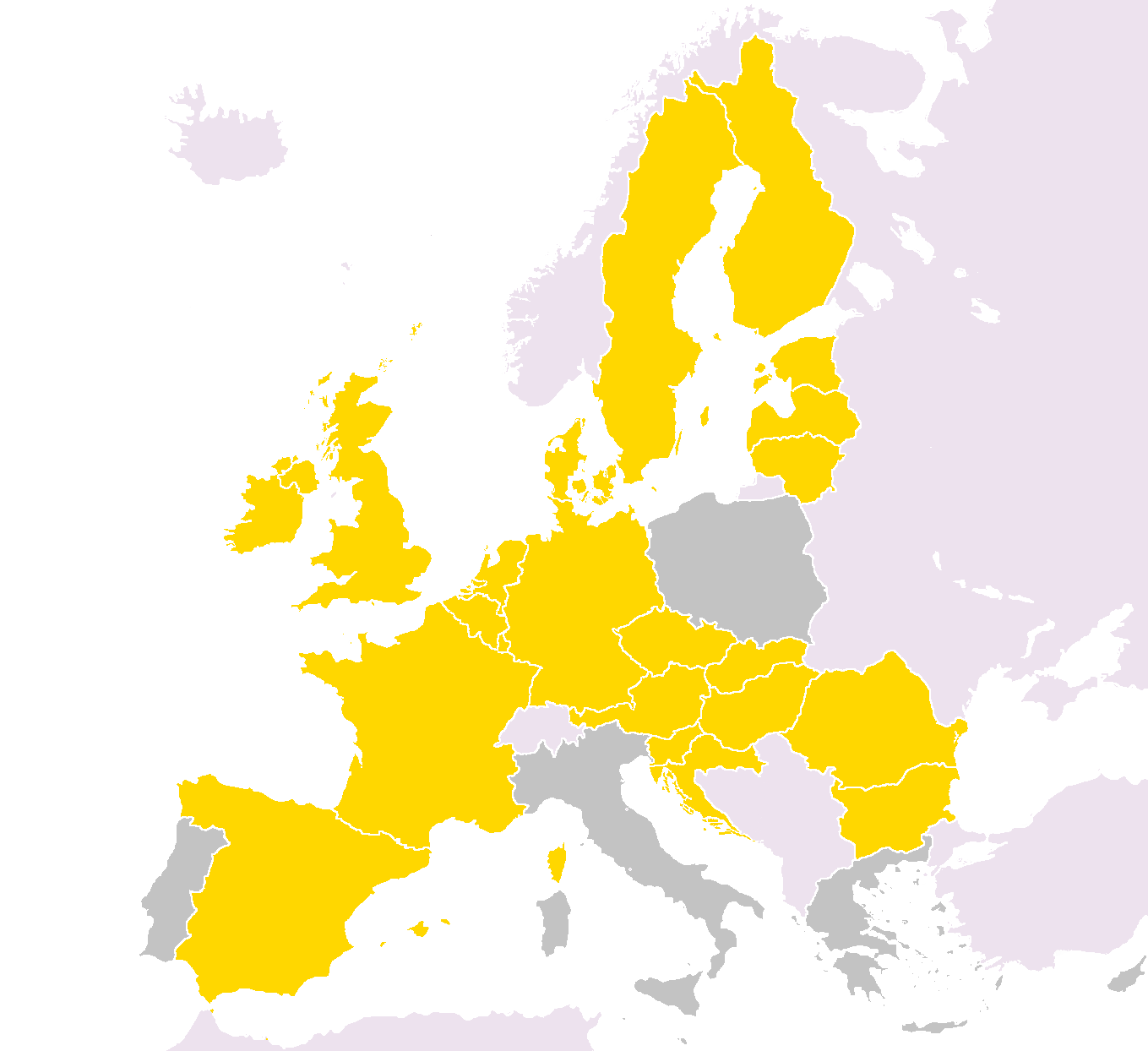
Renew Europe

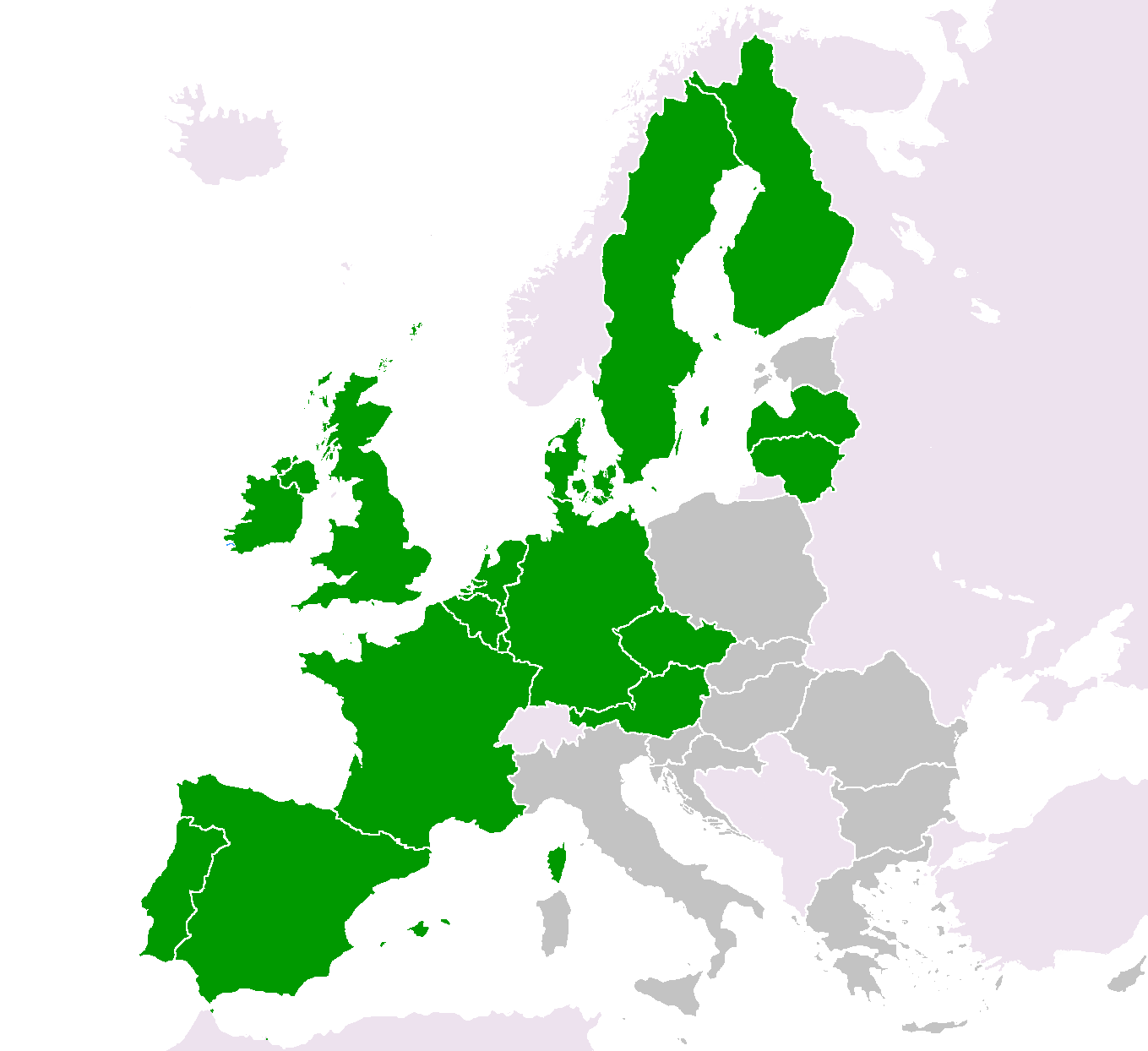
Group of the Greens/European Free Alliance

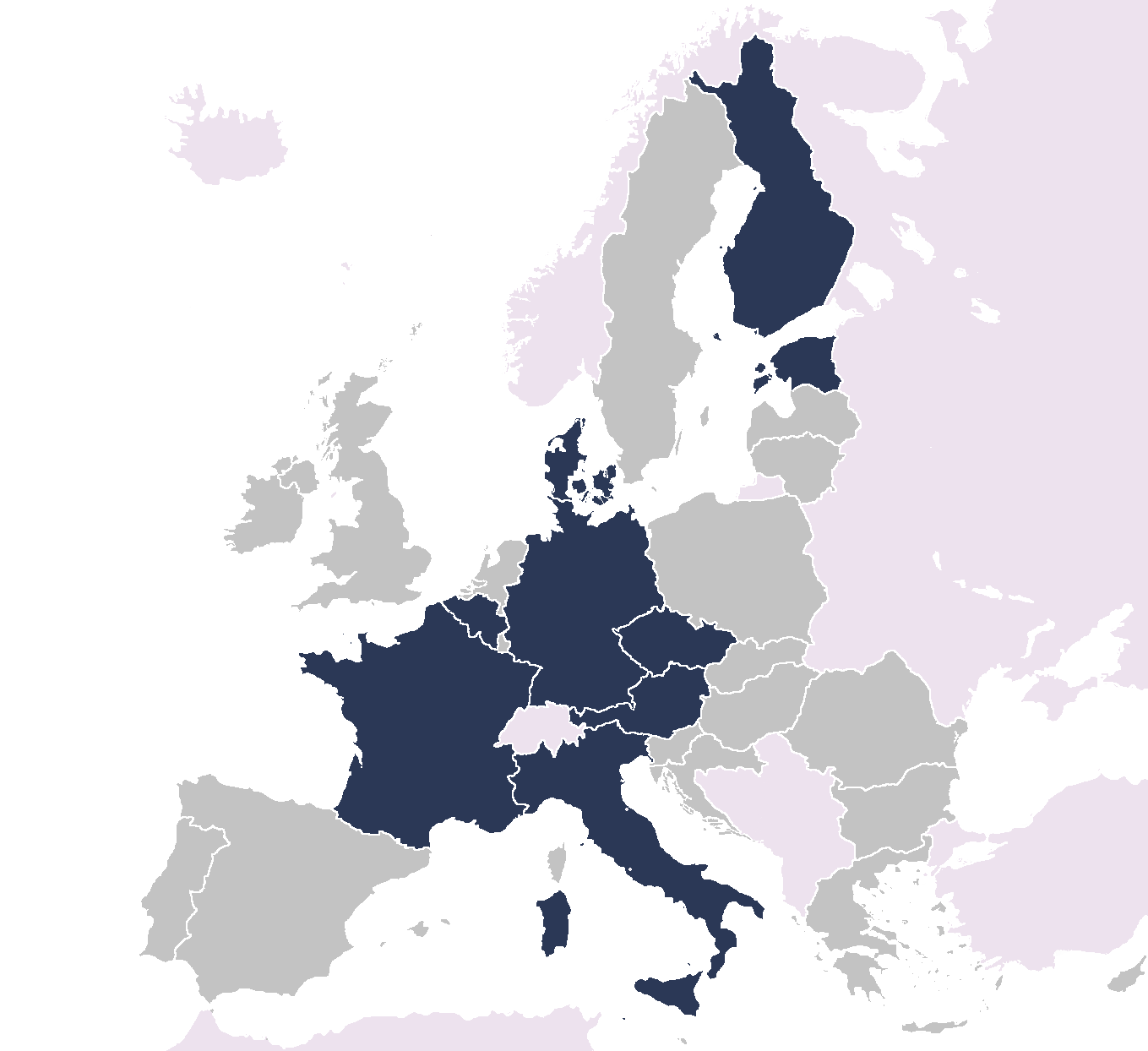
Identity and Democracy

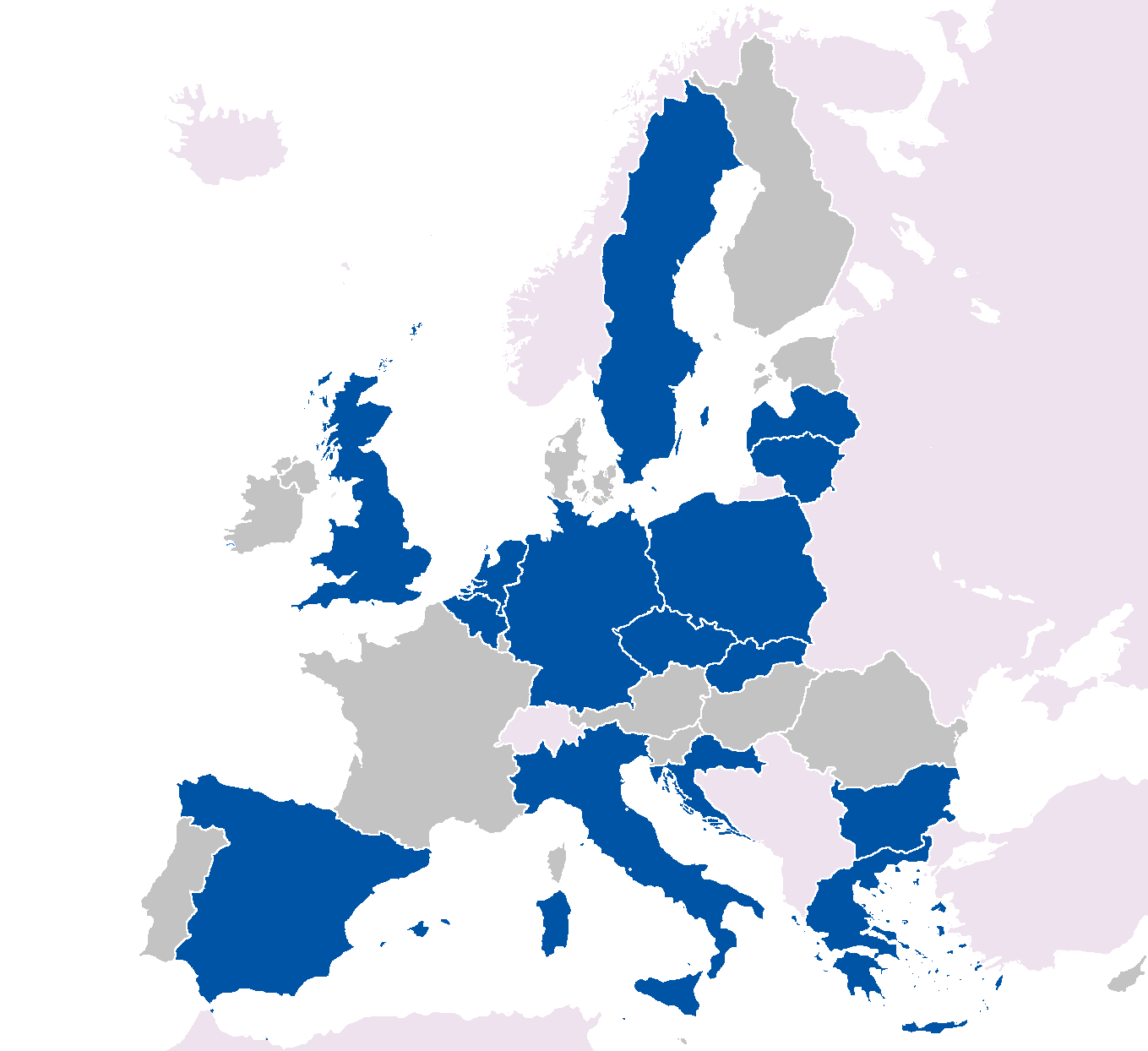
European Conservatives and Reformists

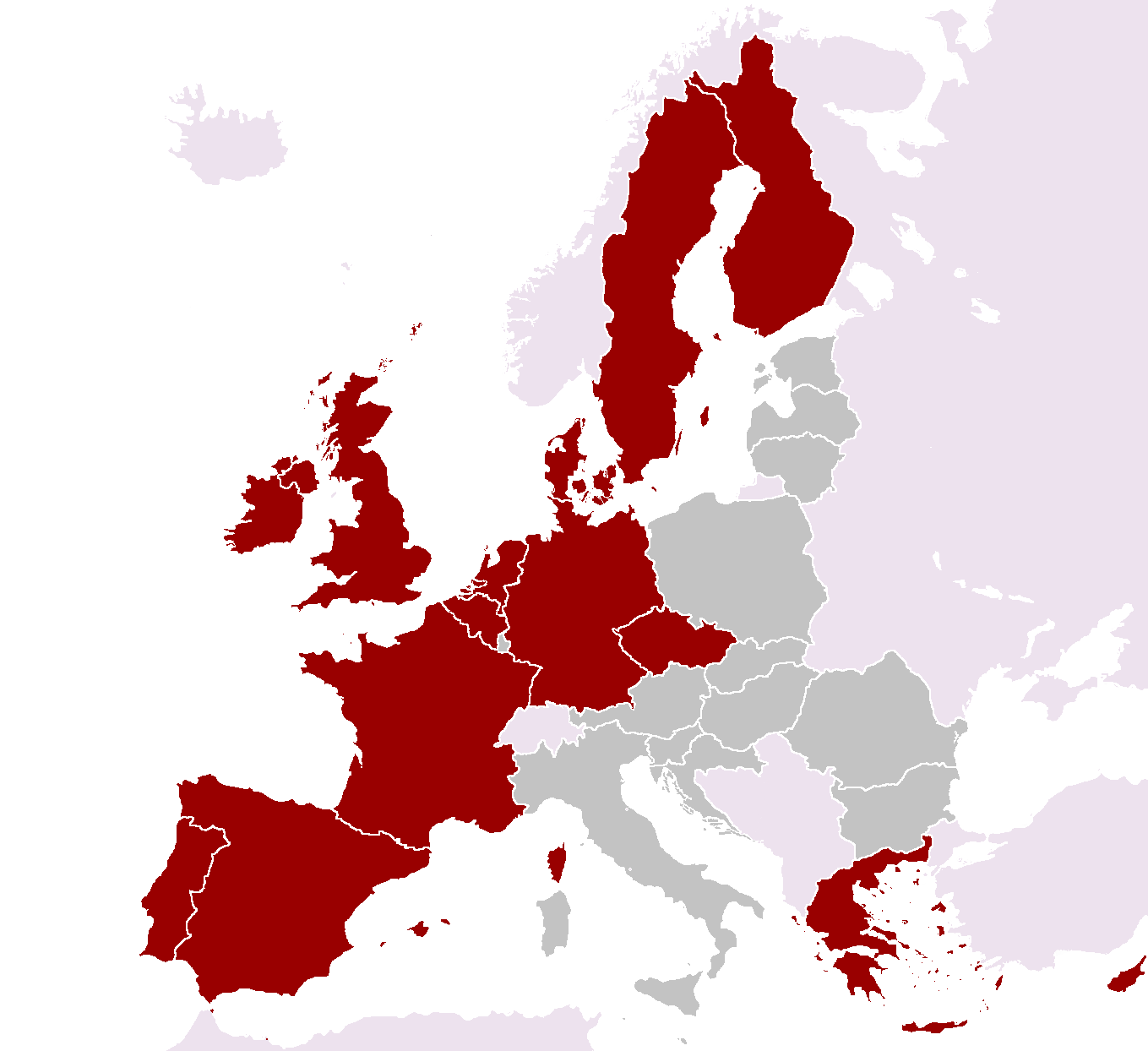
Confederal Group of the European United Left - Nordic Green Left

=== List of members ===
MEPs that previously served as president or Prime Minister:

- Andrus Ansip of Estonia: Prime Minister (2005–2014)
- Traian Băsescu of Romania: President (2004–2014)
- Marek Belka of Poland: Prime Minister (2004–2005)
- Silvio Berlusconi of Italy: Prime Minister (1994–1995, 2001–2006, 2008–2011)
- Jerzy Buzek of Poland: Prime Minister (1997–2001)
- Włodzimierz Cimoszewicz of Poland: Prime Minister (1996–1997)
- Dacian Cioloș of Romania: Prime Minister (2015–2017)
- Ewa Kopacz of Poland: Prime Minister (2014–2015)
- Andrius Kubilius of Lithuania: Prime Minister (1999–2000, 2008–2012)
- Leszek Miller of Poland: Prime Minister (2001–2004)
- Alfred Sant of Malta: Prime Minister (1996–1998)
- Sergei Stanishev of Bulgaria: Prime Minister (2005–2009)
- Beata Szydło of Poland: Prime Minister (2015–2017)
- Mihai Tudose of Romania: Prime Minister (2017–2018)
- Guy Verhofstadt of Belgium: Prime Minister (1999–2008)

MEPs that previously served as European Commissioner:

- Andrus Ansip of Estonia: Vice President, Digital Single Market (2014–2019)
- Dacian Cioloș of Romania: Agriculture and Rural Development (2010–2014)
- Corina Crețu of Romania: Regional Policy (2014–2019)
- Danuta Hübner of Poland: Trade (2004), Regional Policy (2004–2009)
- Sandra Kalniete of Latvia: Agriculture and Fisheries (2004)
- Janusz Lewandowski of Poland: Financial Programming and the Budget (2010–2014)
- Antonio Tajani of Italy: Transport (2008–2010), Industry and Entrepreneurship (2010–2014)

MEPs that previously served as presiding officer of a national parliament:

- Vasile Blaga of Romania: President of the Senate (2011–2012)
- Milan Brglez of Slovenia: Speaker of the National Assembly (2014–2018)
- Włodzimierz Cimoszewicz of Poland: Marshal of the Sejm (2005)
- Eero Heinäluoma of Finland: Speaker of Parliament (2011–2015)
- Vangelis Meimarakis of Greece: Speaker of Parliament (2012–2015)
- Radosław Sikorski of Poland: Marshal of the Sejm (2014–2015)

MEPs that previously served as President of the European Parliament:

- Jerzy Buzek of Poland: President (2009–2012)
- Antonio Tajani of Italy: President (2017–2019)

MEPs that previously served as foreign minister:

- Włodzimierz Cimoszewicz of Poland: Minister of Foreign Affairs (2001–2005)
- Anna Fotyga of Poland: Minister of Foreign Affairs (2006–2007)
- José Manuel García-Margallo of Spain: Minister of Foreign Affairs and Cooperation (2011–2016)
- Marina Kaljurand of Estonia: Minister of Foreign Affairs (2015–2016)
- Sandra Kalniete of Latvia: Minister of Foreign Affairs (2002–2004)
- Sven Mikser of Estonia: Minister of Foreign Affairs (2016–2019)
- Urmas Paet of Estonia: Minister of Foreign Affairs (2005–2014)
- Tonino Picula of Croatia: Minister of Foreign Affairs (2000–2003)
- Radosław Sikorski of Poland: Minister of Foreign Affairs (2007–2014)
- Witold Waszczykowski of Poland: Minister of Foreign Affairs (2015–2018)

=== Seat allocations ===
When the United Kingdom left the EU, 27 seats were reallocated to the other member states and the other 46 seats were abolished, for a total of 705 MEPs.

Member state	Seats Pre Brexit (2019–2020)	Seats Post Brexit (2020–2024)	Post Brexit change
Austria	18	19	▲1
Belgium	21	21	0
Bulgaria	17	17	0
Croatia	11	12	▲1
Cyprus	6	6	0
Czech Republic	21	21	0
Denmark	13	14	▲1
Estonia	6	7	▲1
Finland	13	14	▲1
France	74	79	▲5
Germany	96	96	0
Greece	21	21	0
Hungary	21	21	0
Ireland	11	13	▲2
Italy	73	76	▲3
Latvia	8	8	0
Lithuania	11	11	0
Luxembourg	6	6	0
Malta	6	6	0
Netherlands	26	29	▲3
Poland	51	52	▲1
Portugal	21	21	0
Romania	32	33	▲1
Slovakia	13	14	▲1
Slovenia	8	8	0
Spain	54	59	▲5
Sweden	20	21	▲1
United Kingdom	73	0	▼73
Total	751	705	▼46

=== Post-Brexit political groups membership changes ===
Member state	Political groups								MEPs
Member state	EPP (EPP)	S&D (PES)	RE (ALDE, EDP)	ECR (ECR, ECPM)	GUE/NGL (EL, NGLA, EACL)	G/EFA (EGP, EFA)	ID (ID)	NI	MEPs
Austria						+1 (Grüne)			+1
Croatia		+1 (SDP)							+1
Denmark			+1 (V)						+1
France		+1 (PS)	+1 (LREM) +1 (PD)			+1	+1 (RN)		+5
Estonia	+1 (PP)								+1
Finland						+1 (VIHR)			+1
(Republic of Ireland) Ireland	+1 (FG)		+1 (FF)						+2
Italy	+1 (FI)			+1 (FdI)			+1 (LN)		+3
Netherlands			+1(VVD)	+1 (FvD)			+1 (PVV)		+3
Poland				+1 (PiS)					+1
Romania		+1 (PSD)							+1
Slovakia	+1 (KDH)								+1
Spain	+1 (PP)	+1 (PSOE)	+1 (C's)	+1 (VOX)				+1 (JxCat)	+5
Sweden						+1 (MP)			+1
United Kingdom		-10 (Lab)	-16 (LibDem) -1 (Alliance Party)	-4 (Con)	-1 (SF)	-7 (Green) -3 (SNP) -1 (PC)		-1 (DUP) -29 (Brexit Party)	-73
Total	+5	-6	-11	0	-1	-7	+3	-29	MEPs
Total	EPP	S&D	RE	ECR	GUE/NGL	G/EFA	ID	NI	MEPs

=== Former members ===
Group	Name	State	MEP until	Reason	Source
S&D	André Bradford	POR	18 July 2019	Death	
S&D	Roberto Gualtieri	ITA	5 September 2019	Named Minister of Economy and Finances of Italy	
EPP	Adina-Ioana Vălean	ROM	1 December 2019	Approved as European Commissioner for Transport	
EPP	Dubravka Šuica	CRO	1 December 2019	Approved as European Commission VP for Democracy and Demography	
S&D	Nicolas Schmit	LUX	1 December 2019	Approved as European Commissionioner for Jobs and Social Rights	
EPP	Mairead McGuinness	IRE	12 October 2020	Approved as European Commissioner for Financial Stability, Financial Services and the Capital Markets Union	
S&D	David Sassoli	ITA	11 January 2022	Death	
EPP	Silvio Berlusconi	ITA	12 October 2022	To take up seat in the Italian Senate	

=== Elected MEPs that did not take the seat ===
Group	Name	State	Reason	Source
S&D	Frans Timmermans	NED	Remained European Commissioner for the Netherlands	
EPP	Mariya Gabriel	BUL	Remained European Commissioner for Bulgaria	
EPP	Valdis Dombrovskis	LAT	Remained European Commissioner for Latvia	

== Working bodies ==
=== Standing committees ===
MEPs are divided up among 20 standing committees. Each MEP is usually member of one committee and a substitute member of another. Committees discuss legislative proposals from the commission before the European Parliament decides on them in plenary session. The European Parliament has an equal role to the Council of the EU in the ordinary legislative procedure, which is usually used in decision-making process at the EU level.

Each committee elects its chair and vice chairs to lead the work of the committee. Committee chairs are members of the Conference of Committee Chairs, which coordinates the work of all the committees.

Committee		Members	Chair						Vice Chairs					
Committee		Members	1st half of term (2019–2022)			2nd half of term (2022–2024)			1st half of term (2019–2022)			2nd half of term (2022–2024)		
Committee on Foreign Affairs	AFET	79	EPP	David McAllister				GER	ECR	Witold Waszczykowski				POL
Committee on Foreign Affairs	AFET	79	EPP	David McAllister				GER	RE	Urmas Paet				EST
Committee on Foreign Affairs	AFET	79	EPP	David McAllister				GER	S&D	Sergei Stanishev				BUL
Committee on Foreign Affairs	AFET	79	EPP	David McAllister				GER	EPP	Željana Zovko				HRV
Subcommittee on Security and Defence	SEDE	30	RE	Nathalie Loiseau				FRA	S&D	Nikos Androulakis				GRE
Subcommittee on Security and Defence	SEDE	30	RE	Nathalie Loiseau				FRA	EPP	Rasa Juknevičienė				LIT
Subcommittee on Security and Defence	SEDE	30	RE	Nathalie Loiseau				FRA	GUE / NGL	Özlem Demirel				GER
Subcommittee on Security and Defence	SEDE	30	RE	Nathalie Loiseau				FRA	EPP	Lukas Mandl				AUT
Subcommittee on Human Rights	DROI	30	S&D	Marie Arena				BEL	RE	Bernard Guetta				FRA
Subcommittee on Human Rights	DROI	30	S&D	Marie Arena				BEL	G / EFA	Hannah Neumann				GER
Subcommittee on Human Rights	DROI	30	S&D	Marie Arena				BEL	EPP	Christian Sagartz				AUT
Subcommittee on Human Rights	DROI	30	S&D	Marie Arena				BEL	S&D	Raphaël Glucksmann				FRA
Committee on Development	DEVE	26	EPP	Tomas Tobé				SWE	G / EFA	Pierrette Herzberger-Fofana				GER
Committee on Development	DEVE	26	EPP	Tomas Tobé				SWE	S&D	Norbert Neuser	GER	S&D	Pierfrancesco Majorino	ITA
Committee on Development	DEVE	26	EPP	Tomas Tobé				SWE	RE	Chrysoula Zacharopoulou				FRA
Committee on Development	DEVE	26	EPP	Tomas Tobé				SWE	G / EFA	Erik Marquardt				GER
Committee on International Trade	INTA	41	S&D	Bernd Lange				GER	ECR	Jan Zahradil				CZE
Committee on International Trade	INTA	41	S&D	Bernd Lange				GER	EPP	Iuliu Winkler				ROM
Committee on International Trade	INTA	41	S&D	Bernd Lange				GER	EPP	Anna-Michelle Assimakopoulou				GRE
Committee on International Trade	INTA	41	S&D	Bernd Lange				GER	RE	Marie-Pierre Vedrenne				FRA
Committee on Budgets	BUDG	41	ECR	Johan Van Overtveldt				BEL	EPP	Janusz Lewandowski				POL
Committee on Budgets	BUDG	41	ECR	Johan Van Overtveldt				BEL	RE	Olivier Chastel				BEL
Committee on Budgets	BUDG	41	ECR	Johan Van Overtveldt				BEL	S&D	Margarida Marques				POR
Committee on Budgets	BUDG	41	ECR	Johan Van Overtveldt				BEL	EPP	Niclas Herbst				GER
Committee on Budgetary Control	CONT	30	EPP	Monika Hohlmeier				GER	S&D	Isabel García Muñoz				ESP
Committee on Budgetary Control	CONT	30	EPP	Monika Hohlmeier				GER	S&D	Caterina Chinnici				ITA
Committee on Budgetary Control	CONT	30	EPP	Monika Hohlmeier				GER	RE	Martina Dlabajová	CZE	RE	Gilles Boyer	FRA
Committee on Budgetary Control	CONT	30	EPP	Monika Hohlmeier				GER	EPP	Petri Sarvamaa	FIN	EPP	Tomáš Zdechovský	CZE
Committee on Economic and Monetary Affairs	ECON	61	S&D	Irene Tinagli				ITA	EPP	Luděk Niedermayer				CZE
Committee on Economic and Monetary Affairs	ECON	61	S&D	Irene Tinagli				ITA	RE	Stéphanie Yon-Courtin				FRA
Committee on Economic and Monetary Affairs	ECON	61	S&D	Irene Tinagli				ITA	ECR	Michiel Hoogeveen				NLD
Committee on Economic and Monetary Affairs	ECON	61	S&D	Irene Tinagli				ITA	GUE / NGL	José Gusmão				POR
Subcommittee on Tax Matters	FISC	30	S&D	Paul Tang				NLD	EPP	Markus Ferber				GER
Subcommittee on Tax Matters	FISC	30	S&D	Paul Tang				NLD	RE	Martin Hlaváček				CZE
Subcommittee on Tax Matters	FISC	30	S&D	Paul Tang				NLD	G / EFA	Kira Marie Peter-Hansen				DEN
Subcommittee on Tax Matters	FISC	30	S&D	Paul Tang				NLD	EPP	Othmar Karas				AUT
Committee on Employment and Social Affairs	EMPL	55	RE	Lucia Ďuriš Nicholsonová	SVK	RE	Dragoș Pîslaru	ROM	S&D	Vilija Blinkevičiūtė	LIT	S&D	Elisabetta Gualmini	ITA
Committee on Employment and Social Affairs	EMPL	55	RE	Lucia Ďuriš Nicholsonová	SVK	RE	Dragoș Pîslaru	ROM	GUE / NGL	Sandra Pereira	POR	GUE / NGL	Leïla Chaibi	FRA
Committee on Employment and Social Affairs	EMPL	55	RE	Lucia Ďuriš Nicholsonová	SVK	RE	Dragoș Pîslaru	ROM	EPP	Tomáš Zdechovský	CZE	EPP	Romana Tomc	SLO
Committee on Employment and Social Affairs	EMPL	55	RE	Lucia Ďuriš Nicholsonová	SVK	RE	Dragoș Pîslaru	ROM	G / EFA	Katrin Langensiepen				GER
Committee on Environment, Public Health and Food Safety	ENVI	88	RE	Pascal Canfin				FRA	G / EFA	Bas Eickhout				NED
Committee on Environment, Public Health and Food Safety	ENVI	88	RE	Pascal Canfin				FRA	S&D	César Luena				ESP
Committee on Environment, Public Health and Food Safety	ENVI	88	RE	Pascal Canfin				FRA	EPP	Dan-Ștefan Motreanu				ROM
Committee on Environment, Public Health and Food Safety	ENVI	88	RE	Pascal Canfin				FRA	GUE / NGL	Anja Hazekamp				NED
Committee on Industry, Research and Energy	ITRE	72	EPP	Cristian Bușoi				ROM	ECR	Zdzisław Krasnodębski				POL
Committee on Industry, Research and Energy	ITRE	72	EPP	Cristian Bușoi				ROM	RE	Morten Helveg Petersen				DEN
Committee on Industry, Research and Energy	ITRE	72	EPP	Cristian Bușoi				ROM	S&D	Patrizia Toia				ITA
Committee on Industry, Research and Energy	ITRE	72	EPP	Cristian Bușoi				ROM	S&D	Lina Gálvez				ESP
Committee on Internal Market and Consumer Protection	IMCO	45	G / EFA	Anna Cavazzini				GER	RE	Andrus Ansip				EST
Committee on Internal Market and Consumer Protection	IMCO	45	G / EFA	Anna Cavazzini				GER	S&D	Maria Grapini				ROM
Committee on Internal Market and Consumer Protection	IMCO	45	G / EFA	Anna Cavazzini				GER	EPP	Krzysztof Hetman				POL
Committee on Internal Market and Consumer Protection	IMCO	45	G / EFA	Anna Cavazzini				GER	S&D	Maria Manuel Leitão Marques				POR
Committee on Transport and Tourism	TRAN	49	G / EFA	Karima Delli				FRA	S&D	István Ujhelyi				HUN
Committee on Transport and Tourism	TRAN	49	G / EFA	Karima Delli				FRA	EPP	Jens Gieseke				GER
Committee on Transport and Tourism	TRAN	49	G / EFA	Karima Delli				FRA	S&D	Andris Ameriks				LAT
Committee on Transport and Tourism	TRAN	49	G / EFA	Karima Delli				FRA	RE	Jan-Christoph Oetjen				GER
Committee on Regional Development	REGI	43	GUE / NGL	Younous Omarjee				FRA	EPP	Krzysztof Hetman				POL
Committee on Regional Development	REGI	43	GUE / NGL	Younous Omarjee				FRA	RE	Vlad-Marius Botoş				ROM
Committee on Regional Development	REGI	43	GUE / NGL	Younous Omarjee				FRA	S&D	Adrian-Dragoş Benea	ROM	S&D	Nora Mebarek	FRA
Committee on Regional Development	REGI	43	GUE / NGL	Younous Omarjee				FRA	EPP	Isabel Benjumea Benjumea				ESP
Committee on Agriculture and Rural Development	AGRI	48	EPP	Norbert Lins				GER	G / EFA	Francisco Guerreiro	POR	G / EFA	Benoît Biteau	FRA
Committee on Agriculture and Rural Development	AGRI	48	EPP	Norbert Lins				GER	EPP	Daniel Buda				ROM
Committee on Agriculture and Rural Development	AGRI	48	EPP	Norbert Lins				GER	ECR	Mazaly Aguilar				ESP
Committee on Agriculture and Rural Development	AGRI	48	EPP	Norbert Lins				GER	RE	Elsi Katainen				FIN
Committee on Fisheries	PECH	28	RE	Pierre Karleskind				FRA	EPP	Peter van Dalen				NED
Committee on Fisheries	PECH	28	RE	Pierre Karleskind				FRA	RE	Søren Gade				DEN
Committee on Fisheries	PECH	28	RE	Pierre Karleskind				FRA	S&D	Giuseppe Ferrandino				ITA
Committee on Fisheries	PECH	28	RE	Pierre Karleskind				FRA	EPP	Maria da Graça Carvalho				POR
Committee on Culture and Education	CULT	31	EPP	Sabine Verheyen				GER	G / EFA	Romeo Franz				GER
Committee on Culture and Education	CULT	31	EPP	Sabine Verheyen				GER	ECR	Dace Melbārde				LAT
Committee on Culture and Education	CULT	31	EPP	Sabine Verheyen				GER	S&D	Victor Negrescu				ROM
Committee on Culture and Education	CULT	31	EPP	Sabine Verheyen				GER	EPP	Milan Zver	SVN	EPP	Michaela Šojdrová	CZE
Committee on Legal Affairs	JURI	25	RE	Adrián Vázquez Lázara				ESP	G / EFA	Sergey Lagodinsky				GER
Committee on Legal Affairs	JURI	25	RE	Adrián Vázquez Lázara				ESP	EPP	Marion Walsmann				GER
Committee on Legal Affairs	JURI	25	RE	Adrián Vázquez Lázara				ESP	S&D	Iban García del Blanco	ESP	S&D	Lara Wolters	NED
Committee on Legal Affairs	JURI	25	RE	Adrián Vázquez Lázara				ESP	ECR	Raffaele Stancanelli				ITA
Committee on Civil Liberties, Justice and Home Affairs	LIBE	69	S&D	Juan Fernando López Aguilar				ESP	RE	Maite Pagazaurtundúa				ESP
Committee on Civil Liberties, Justice and Home Affairs	LIBE	69	S&D	Juan Fernando López Aguilar				ESP	S&D	Pietro Bartolo				ITA
Committee on Civil Liberties, Justice and Home Affairs	LIBE	69	S&D	Juan Fernando López Aguilar				ESP	EPP	Andrzej Halicki				POL
Committee on Civil Liberties, Justice and Home Affairs	LIBE	69	S&D	Juan Fernando López Aguilar				ESP	EPP	Emil Radev				BUL
Committee on Constitutional Affairs	AFCO	28	EPP	Antonio Tajani				ITA	S&D	Gabriele Bischoff				GER
Committee on Constitutional Affairs	AFCO	28	EPP	Antonio Tajani				ITA	RE	Charles Goerens				LUX
Committee on Constitutional Affairs	AFCO	28	EPP	Antonio Tajani				ITA	S&D	Giuliano Pisapia				ITA
Committee on Constitutional Affairs	AFCO	28	EPP	Antonio Tajani				ITA	EPP	Lóránt Vincze				ROM
Committee on Women's Rights and Gender Equality	FEMM	37	S&D	Evelyn Regner	AUT	S&D	Robert Biedroń	POL	GUE / NGL	María Eugenia Rodríguez Palop				ESP
Committee on Women's Rights and Gender Equality	FEMM	37	S&D	Evelyn Regner	AUT	S&D	Robert Biedroń	POL	G / EFA	Sylwia Spurek				POL
Committee on Women's Rights and Gender Equality	FEMM	37	S&D	Evelyn Regner	AUT	S&D	Robert Biedroń	POL	EPP	Eliza Vozemberg				GRE
Committee on Women's Rights and Gender Equality	FEMM	37	S&D	Evelyn Regner	AUT	S&D	Robert Biedroń	POL	S&D	Robert Biedroń	POL	S&D	Radka Maxová	CZE
Committee on Petitions	PETI	35	EPP	Dolors Montserrat				ESP	G / EFA	Tatjana Ždanoka				LAT
Committee on Petitions	PETI	35	EPP	Dolors Montserrat				ESP	RE	Yana Toom				EST
Committee on Petitions	PETI	35	EPP	Dolors Montserrat				ESP	ECR	Ryszard Czarnecki				POL
Committee on Petitions	PETI	35	EPP	Dolors Montserrat				ESP	S&D	Cristina Maestre	ESP	S&D	Alex Agius Saliba	MLT

=== Other bodies ===
Body		Members	President			Members
Conference of Presidents	BCPR	11	S&D	David Sassoli (ex-officio); 1st Half	ITA	President of the European Parliament; Presidents of political groups One NI MEP, invited by the President (no voting right)
Conference of Presidents	BCPR	11	EPP	Roberta Metsola (ex-officio); 2nd Half	MLT	President of the European Parliament; Presidents of political groups One NI MEP, invited by the President (no voting right)
The Bureau	BURO	20	S&D	David Sassoli (ex-officio); 1st Half	ITA	President of the European Parliament; Vice Presidents of the European Parliament; Quaestors (in advisory capacity)
The Bureau	BURO	20	EPP	Roberta Metsola (ex-officio); 2nd Half	MLT	President of the European Parliament; Vice Presidents of the European Parliament; Quaestors (in advisory capacity)
College of Quaestors	QUE	5	/			Quaestors
Conference of Committee Chairs	CCC	22	EPP	Antonio Tajani	ITA	Chairs of all standing and temporary committees
Conference of Delegation Chairs	CDC	45	S&D	Inmaculada Rodríguez-Piñero	ESP	Chairs of all standing interparliamentary delegations

== Composition of the executive ==
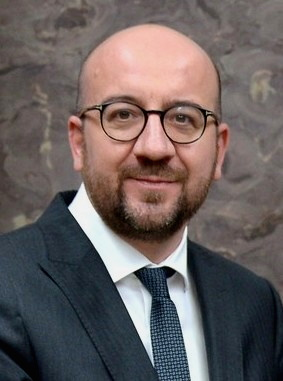
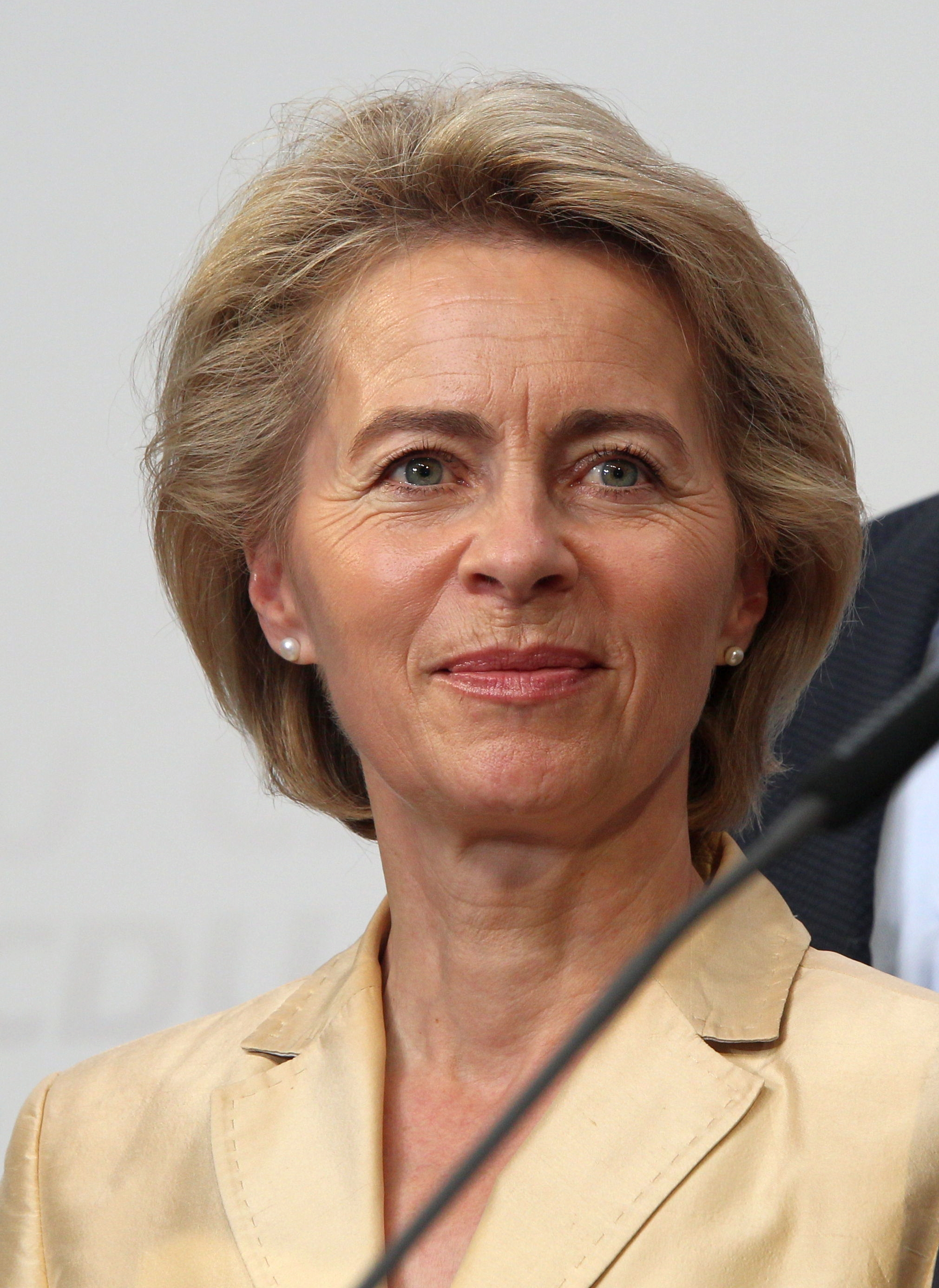
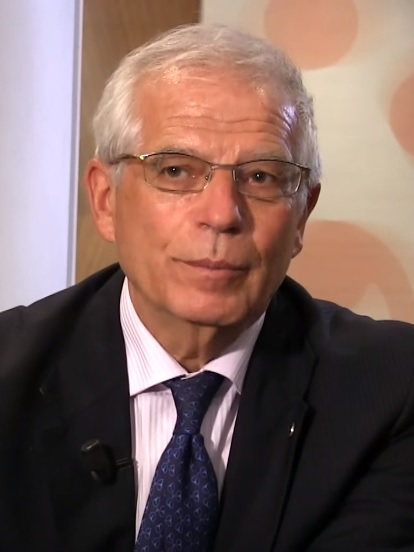
Executive
President of the European Council	President of the European Commission	High Representative
Charles Michel (ALDE) of Belgium from 1 December 2019	Ursula von der Leyen (EPP) of Germany from 1 December 2019	Josep Borrell (PES) of Spain from 1 December 2019

Parliament term: 2 July 2019 - TBA
European Council
President (Poland) Donald Tusk (EPP), until 31 November 2019
President (Belgium) Charles Michel (ALDE), from 1 December 2019
European Commission
Juncker Commission, until 30 November 2019
President (Luxembourg) Jean-Claude Juncker (EPP), until 30 November 2019
High Representative (Italy) Federica Mogherini (PES), until 30 November 2019
Von der Leyen Commission, taking office on 1 December 2019
President (Germany) Ursula von der Leyen (EPP), from 1 December 2019
High Representative (Spain) Josep Borrell (PES), from 1 December 2019

=== Appointment of the new executive ===
On 2 July 2019 European Council finished a three-day-long summit with a decision to propose the following for approval by the Parliament:

- (Germany) Ursula von der Leyen (EPP) for President
- (Spain) Josep Borrell (PES) for High Representative

European Parliament confirmed Ursula von Der Leyen as President of the European Commission on 16 July 2019.

On the same summit Charles Michel (ALDE), incumbent Prime Minister of Belgium was elected a new President of the European Council and President of Euro Summit for a 2.5 years term.

==== President of the Commission election ====
Secret paper ballot took place on 16 July 2019.

Candidate			Votes cast	Majority	In favor	Against	Blank	Source
EPP	Ursula von der Leyen	GER	733	374	383	327	22	

==== Von der Leyen Commission Confirmation ====
Following the election of the new President of the commission, President-elect called upon member states to propose candidates for European Commissioners. The President-elect, in agreement with the European Council, assigned to each proposed candidate a portfolio, and the Council sent the list of candidates to the European Parliament. Candidates were then questioned about their knowledge of the assigned portfolio and confirmed by European Parliament Committees. When all of the candidates were confirmed by the respective committee, European Parliament took a vote of confirmation of the new European Commission in the plenary session. European Commission was then officially appointed by the European Council using qualified majority. Commissioners took the oath of office before the Court of Justice of the EU before officially taking office.

Coalition	Commission	Votes cast	Majority	In favor	Against	Abstain	Source
EPP	Von der Leyen Commission	707	374	461	157	89	
S&D	Von der Leyen Commission	707	374	461	157	89	
RE	Von der Leyen Commission	707	374	461	157	89	

== Council presidency ==
Presidency of the
Council of the EU
Belgium
1 January 2024 - 30 June 2024

The Council of the European Union (Council) is one of three EU institutions involved in the EU lawmaking process. It is the de facto upper house of the EU legislature, the European Parliament being the lower house, with an equal role in the ordinary legislative procedure. The Council consists of ministerial representatives from member states' national governments. Votes are decided by qualified majority (55% of member states and 65% of EU population).

Every six months, a new EU member state takes over the presidency of the council. As presiding country, it organises Council meetings (with the help of Secretariat General) and decides on their agendas. These agendas are prepared in cooperation with other two member states that are part of each trio, which form common policy agendas over their 18-month period.

Presidency of the Council of the European Union								Parliament	Commission	High Representative FAC President		European Council	
Member state	Trio	Term	Head of Government		Cabinet	Government coalition		Parliament	Commission	High Representative FAC President		European Council	
Romania	T9	1 January 2019 – 30 June 2019	PES	Prime Minister; Viorica Dăncilă (PSD)	Dăncilă	PES	PSD	VIII	Juncker	PES	Federica Mogherini	EPP	Donald Tusk
Romania	T9	1 January 2019 – 30 June 2019	PES	Prime Minister; Viorica Dăncilă (PSD)	Dăncilă	ALDE	ALDE	VIII	Juncker	PES	Federica Mogherini	EPP	Donald Tusk
Finland	T9	1 July 2019 – 31 December 2019	PES	Prime Minister; Antti Rinne (SDP) until 10 December 2019	Rinne	PES	SDP	VIII	Juncker	PES	Federica Mogherini	EPP	Donald Tusk
Finland	T9	1 July 2019 – 31 December 2019	PES	Prime Minister; Antti Rinne (SDP) until 10 December 2019	Rinne	ALDE	Kesk.	IX	Juncker	PES	Federica Mogherini	EPP	Donald Tusk
Finland	T9	1 July 2019 – 31 December 2019	PES	Prime Minister; Antti Rinne (SDP) until 10 December 2019	Rinne	EGP	VIHR	IX	Juncker	PES	Federica Mogherini	EPP	Donald Tusk
Finland	T9	1 July 2019 – 31 December 2019	PES	Prime Minister; Antti Rinne (SDP) until 10 December 2019	Rinne	PEL	Vas.	IX	Juncker	PES	Federica Mogherini	EPP	Donald Tusk
Finland	T9	1 July 2019 – 31 December 2019	PES	Prime Minister; Antti Rinne (SDP) until 10 December 2019	Rinne	ALDE	SFP	IX	Von der Leyen	PES	Josep Borrell	ALDE	Charles Michel
Finland	T9	1 July 2019 – 31 December 2019	PES	Prime Minister; Sanna Marin (SDP) from 10 December 2019	Marin	PES	SDP	IX	Von der Leyen	PES	Josep Borrell	ALDE	Charles Michel
Finland	T9	1 July 2019 – 31 December 2019	PES	Prime Minister; Sanna Marin (SDP) from 10 December 2019	Marin	ALDE	Kesk.	IX	Von der Leyen	PES	Josep Borrell	ALDE	Charles Michel
Finland	T9	1 July 2019 – 31 December 2019	PES	Prime Minister; Sanna Marin (SDP) from 10 December 2019	Marin	PEL	Vas.	IX	Von der Leyen	PES	Josep Borrell	ALDE	Charles Michel
Finland	T9	1 July 2019 – 31 December 2019	PES	Prime Minister; Sanna Marin (SDP) from 10 December 2019	Marin	EGP	VIHR	IX	Von der Leyen	PES	Josep Borrell	ALDE	Charles Michel
Finland	T9	1 July 2019 – 31 December 2019	PES	Prime Minister; Sanna Marin (SDP) from 10 December 2019	Marin	ALDE	SFP	IX	Von der Leyen	PES	Josep Borrell	ALDE	Charles Michel
Croatia	T9	1 January 2020 – 30 June 2020	EPP	Prime Minister; Andrej Plenković (HDZ)	Plenković	EPP	HDZ	IX	Von der Leyen	PES	Josep Borrell	ALDE	Charles Michel
Croatia	T9	1 January 2020 – 30 June 2020	EPP	Prime Minister; Andrej Plenković (HDZ)	Plenković	ALDE	HNS	IX	Von der Leyen	PES	Josep Borrell	ALDE	Charles Michel
Germany	T10	1 July 2020 – 31 December 2020	EPP	Federal Chancellor; Angela Merkel (CDU)	Merkel IV	EPP	CDU	IX	Von der Leyen	PES	Josep Borrell	ALDE	Charles Michel
Germany	T10	1 July 2020 – 31 December 2020	EPP	Federal Chancellor; Angela Merkel (CDU)	Merkel IV	PES	SPD	IX	Von der Leyen	PES	Josep Borrell	ALDE	Charles Michel
Germany	T10	1 July 2020 – 31 December 2020	EPP	Federal Chancellor; Angela Merkel (CDU)	Merkel IV	EPP	CSU	IX	Von der Leyen	PES	Josep Borrell	ALDE	Charles Michel
Portugal	T10	1 January 2021 – 30 June 2021	PES	Prime Minister; António Costa (PS)	Costa II	PES	PS	IX	Von der Leyen	PES	Josep Borrell	ALDE	Charles Michel
Slovenia	T10	1 July 2021 – 31 December 2021	EPP	Prime Minister; Janez Janša (SDS)	Janša III	EPP	SDS	IX	Von der Leyen	PES	Josep Borrell	ALDE	Charles Michel
Slovenia	T10	1 July 2021 – 31 December 2021	EPP	Prime Minister; Janez Janša (SDS)	Janša III	ALDE	SMC	IX	Von der Leyen	PES	Josep Borrell	ALDE	Charles Michel
Slovenia	T10	1 July 2021 – 31 December 2021	EPP	Prime Minister; Janez Janša (SDS)	Janša III	EPP	NSi	IX	Von der Leyen	PES	Josep Borrell	ALDE	Charles Michel
Slovenia	T10	1 July 2021 – 31 December 2021	EPP	Prime Minister; Janez Janša (SDS)	Janša III	EDP	DeSUS	IX	Von der Leyen	PES	Josep Borrell	ALDE	Charles Michel
France	T11	1 January 2022 – 30 June 2022	Ind.	Prime Minister; Jean Castex (DVD-EC)	Castex	Ind.	LREM	IX	Von der Leyen	PES	Josep Borrell	ALDE	Charles Michel
France	T11	1 January 2022 – 30 June 2022	Ind.	Prime Minister; Jean Castex (DVD-EC)	Castex	Ind.	TDP	IX	Von der Leyen	PES	Josep Borrell	ALDE	Charles Michel
France	T11	1 January 2022 – 30 June 2022	Ind.	Prime Minister; Jean Castex (DVD-EC)	Castex	Ind.	EC	IX	Von der Leyen	PES	Josep Borrell	ALDE	Charles Michel
France	T11	1 January 2022 – 30 June 2022	Ind.	Prime Minister; Jean Castex (DVD-EC)	Castex	EDP	MoDem	IX	Von der Leyen	PES	Josep Borrell	ALDE	Charles Michel
France	T11	1 January 2022 – 30 June 2022	Ind.	Prime Minister; Jean Castex (DVD-EC)	Castex	ALDE	RAD	IX	Von der Leyen	PES	Josep Borrell	ALDE	Charles Michel
France	T11	1 January 2022 – 30 June 2022	Ind.	Prime Minister; Jean Castex (DVD-EC)	Castex	Ind.	Agir	IX	Von der Leyen	PES	Josep Borrell	ALDE	Charles Michel
Czech Republic	T11	1 July 2022 – 31 December 2022	ECR	Prime Minister; Petr Fiala (ODS)	Fiala	ECR	ODS	IX	Von der Leyen	PES	Josep Borrell	ALDE	Charles Michel
Czech Republic	T11	1 July 2022 – 31 December 2022	ECR	Prime Minister; Petr Fiala (ODS)	Fiala	EPP	STAN	IX	Von der Leyen	PES	Josep Borrell	ALDE	Charles Michel
Czech Republic	T11	1 July 2022 – 31 December 2022	ECR	Prime Minister; Petr Fiala (ODS)	Fiala	EPP	KDU-ČSL	IX	Von der Leyen	PES	Josep Borrell	ALDE	Charles Michel
Czech Republic	T11	1 July 2022 – 31 December 2022	ECR	Prime Minister; Petr Fiala (ODS)	Fiala	PPEU	Pirates	IX	Von der Leyen	PES	Josep Borrell	ALDE	Charles Michel
Czech Republic	T11	1 July 2022 – 31 December 2022	ECR	Prime Minister; Petr Fiala (ODS)	Fiala	EPP	TOP 09	IX	Von der Leyen	PES	Josep Borrell	ALDE	Charles Michel
Sweden	T11	1 January 2023 – 30 June 2023	EPP	Prime Minister; Ulf Kristersson (M)	Kristersson	EPP	M	IX	Von der Leyen	PES	Josep Borrell	ALDE	Charles Michel
Sweden	T11	1 January 2023 – 30 June 2023	EPP	Prime Minister; Ulf Kristersson (M)	Kristersson	EPP	KD	IX	Von der Leyen	PES	Josep Borrell	ALDE	Charles Michel
Sweden	T11	1 January 2023 – 30 June 2023	EPP	Prime Minister; Ulf Kristersson (M)	Kristersson	ALDE	L	IX	Von der Leyen	PES	Josep Borrell	ALDE	Charles Michel
Spain	T12	1 July 2023 – 31 December 2023	PES	Prime Minister Pedro Sánchez (PSOE)	Sánchez II until 21 November 2023	PES	PSOE	IX	Von der Leyen	PES	Josep Borrell	ALDE	Charles Michel
Spain	T12	1 July 2023 – 31 December 2023	PES	Prime Minister Pedro Sánchez (PSOE)	Sánchez II until 21 November 2023	MLP	Podemos	IX	Von der Leyen	PES	Josep Borrell	ALDE	Charles Michel
Spain	T12	1 July 2023 – 31 December 2023	PES	Prime Minister Pedro Sánchez (PSOE)	Sánchez II until 21 November 2023	PEL	PCE	IX	Von der Leyen	PES	Josep Borrell	ALDE	Charles Michel
Spain	T12	1 July 2023 – 31 December 2023	PES	Prime Minister Pedro Sánchez (PSOE)	Sánchez II until 21 November 2023	PEL	IU	IX	Von der Leyen	PES	Josep Borrell	ALDE	Charles Michel
Spain	T12	1 July 2023 – 31 December 2023	PES	Prime Minister Pedro Sánchez (PSOE)	Sánchez II until 21 November 2023	EGP	CatComú	IX	Von der Leyen	PES	Josep Borrell	ALDE	Charles Michel
Spain	T12	1 July 2023 – 31 December 2023	PES	Prime Minister Pedro Sánchez (PSOE)	Sánchez III from 21 November 2023	PES	PSOE	IX	Von der Leyen	PES	Josep Borrell	ALDE	Charles Michel
Spain	T12	1 July 2023 – 31 December 2023	PES	Prime Minister Pedro Sánchez (PSOE)	Sánchez III from 21 November 2023	Ind.	MS	IX	Von der Leyen	PES	Josep Borrell	ALDE	Charles Michel
Spain	T12	1 July 2023 – 31 December 2023	PES	Prime Minister Pedro Sánchez (PSOE)	Sánchez III from 21 November 2023	PES	PSC	IX	Von der Leyen	PES	Josep Borrell	ALDE	Charles Michel
Spain	T12	1 July 2023 – 31 December 2023	PES	Prime Minister Pedro Sánchez (PSOE)	Sánchez III from 21 November 2023	EGP	CatComú	IX	Von der Leyen	PES	Josep Borrell	ALDE	Charles Michel
Spain	T12	1 July 2023 – 31 December 2023	PES	Prime Minister Pedro Sánchez (PSOE)	Sánchez III from 21 November 2023	Ind.	MM	IX	Von der Leyen	PES	Josep Borrell	ALDE	Charles Michel
Spain	T12	1 July 2023 – 31 December 2023	PES	Prime Minister Pedro Sánchez (PSOE)	Sánchez III from 21 November 2023	PEL	IU	IX	Von der Leyen	PES	Josep Borrell	ALDE	Charles Michel
Spain	T12	1 July 2023 – 31 December 2023	PES	Prime Minister Pedro Sánchez (PSOE)	Sánchez III from 21 November 2023	PEL	PCE	IX	Von der Leyen	PES	Josep Borrell	ALDE	Charles Michel
Belgium	T12	1 January 2024 – 30 June 2024	ALDE	Prime Minister; Alexander De Croo (Open Vld)	De Croo	ALDE	Open Vld	IX	Von der Leyen	PES	Josep Borrell	ALDE	Charles Michel
Belgium	T12	1 January 2024 – 30 June 2024	ALDE	Prime Minister; Alexander De Croo (Open Vld)	De Croo	ALDE	MR	IX	Von der Leyen	PES	Josep Borrell	ALDE	Charles Michel
Belgium	T12	1 January 2024 – 30 June 2024	ALDE	Prime Minister; Alexander De Croo (Open Vld)	De Croo	PES	Vooruit	IX	Von der Leyen	PES	Josep Borrell	ALDE	Charles Michel
Belgium	T12	1 January 2024 – 30 June 2024	ALDE	Prime Minister; Alexander De Croo (Open Vld)	De Croo	PES	PS	IX	Von der Leyen	PES	Josep Borrell	ALDE	Charles Michel
Belgium	T12	1 January 2024 – 30 June 2024	ALDE	Prime Minister; Alexander De Croo (Open Vld)	De Croo	EPP	CD&V	IX	Von der Leyen	PES	Josep Borrell	ALDE	Charles Michel
Belgium	T12	1 January 2024 – 30 June 2024	ALDE	Prime Minister; Alexander De Croo (Open Vld)	De Croo	EGP	Groen	IX	Von der Leyen	PES	Josep Borrell	ALDE	Charles Michel
Belgium	T12	1 January 2024 – 30 June 2024	ALDE	Prime Minister; Alexander De Croo (Open Vld)	De Croo	EGP	Ecolo	IX	Von der Leyen	PES	Josep Borrell	ALDE	Charles Michel
Hungary	T12	1 July 2024 – 31 December 2024	TBD		TBD	TBD		X	TBD	TBD		TBD	

== Appointments ==
European Parliament has role in the appointment of:

- President of the European Commission
- Members of the European Commission
- Members of the European Court of Auditors
- Members of the Executive Board of the European Central Bank and supervisory board of the European Central Bank
- economic governance bodies:
  - Chair and Vice Chair of the supervisory board of the ECB Supervisory
  - Chair, Vice Chair and full-time members of the Single Resolution Board of the Single Resolution Mechanism
  - Chairs and executive directors of the European Supervisory Authorities (European Banking Authority, European Securities and Markets Authority, European Insurance and Occupational Pensions Authority)
  - Managing Director and Deputy Managing Director of the European Fund for Strategic Investments

Position	Candidate			EP Role	Appointer	Hearing					European Parliament vote						Source
Position	Party	Name	Country	EP Role	Appointer	Date	Committee	In favor	Against	Abstain	Date	Votes cast	Majority	In favor	Against	Abstain	Source
President of the European Central Bank	EPP	Christine Lagarde	FRA	Consultation	European Council	4 September 2019	ECON	37	11	4	17 September 2019	649	325	349	206	49	
Vice Chair of the supervisory board of the European Central Bank	Ind	Yves Mersch	LUX	Consultation	Governing Council of the European Central Bank	4 September 2019	ECON	35	14	4	17 September 2019	678	340	379	230	69	
Chief European Public Prosecutor	Ind	Laura Codruța Kövesi	ROM	Appointment	European Parliament; Council of the EU	Confirmed by the BCPR, no EP vote.											

== Statistics ==
=== European Parliament statistics ===
There were 266 women MEPs, 37.7% of the whole Parliament. Kira Peter-Hansen of Denmark was the youngest MEP at 21, while Silvio Berlusconi (former Prime Minister of Italy), was the oldest at the age of 82. The average age of all MEPs was 50.

387 of the MEPs were newly elected and weren't members of European Parliament before. 295 MEPs were also members of the previous Parliament. 16 of the MEPs held position before, but not between 2014 and 2019.

Women MEPs	New MEPs	Age		
Women MEPs	New MEPs	Youngest	Average	Oldest
266 / 705	387 / 705	21	50	82

=== Statistics by member states ===
Most bureau positions is held by Germany, while on the other side Slovenia is the only member state that has no bureau positions. With 5, Germany has most Committee Chairmen, followed by France with 4.

Finland (with 7 women out of 13 MEPs) and Sweden (with 11 out of 20) are the only member states with more women MEPS than men. Austria, Latvia, Luxembourg, the Netherlands and Slovenia have a gender parity. Cyprus is the only member state without any women.

Slovakia has the highest percent of newly elected MEPs at 85%, while Malta only has 33% of newly elected MEPs.

With 60 years of age Lithuania has the oldest national delegation, while Malta has the youngest at 44. Sweden has the youngest "oldest" MEP at the age of 58 and Lithuania has the oldest "youngest" MEP at the age of 54.

Member state	Positions			Women MEPs	New MEPs	Age		
Member state	EP Bureau	Committees' bureaus	Groups' bureaus	Women MEPs	New MEPs	Youngest	Average	Oldest
Austria	1 / 20	3 / 110	0 / 55	9 / 18	12 / 18	27	47	61
Belgium	0 / 20	4 / 110	3 / 55	7 / 21	11 / 21	34	52	68
Bulgaria	0 / 20	1 / 110	2 / 55	5 / 17	8 / 17	30	45	67
Croatia	0 / 20	0 / 110	2 / 55	4 / 11	6 / 11	28	47	62
Cyprus	0 / 20	0 / 110	1 / 55	0 / 6	3 / 6	49	55	59
Czech Republic	2 / 20	4 / 110	0 / 55	7 / 21	11 / 21	26	46	66
Denmark	0 / 20	2 / 110	1 / 55	6 / 14	8 / 14	21	46	74
Estonia	0 / 20	1 / 110	0 / 55	2 / 6	3 / 6	28	48	62
Finland	1 / 20	1 / 110	0 / 55	8 / 13	6 / 13	40	55	73
France	2 / 20	10 / 110	6 / 55	37 / 74	51 / 74	23	50	72
Germany	3 / 20	17 / 110	6 / 55	35 / 96	50 / 96	26	49	78
Greece	1 / 20	3 / 110	1 / 55	5 / 21	11 / 21	33	52	67
Hungary	2 / 20	3 / 110	1 / 55	8 / 21	8 / 21	30	46	66
(Republic of Ireland) Ireland	1 / 20	0 / 110	1 / 55	6 / 11	7 / 11	32	54	68
Italy	2 / 20	8 / 110	3 / 55	30 / 73	41 / 73	30	49	82
Latvia	0 / 20	2 / 110	1 / 55	4 / 8	4 / 8	43	57	69
Lithuania	0 / 20	1 / 110	0 / 55	3 / 11	6 / 11	54	60	65
Luxembourg	0 / 20	1 / 110	0 / 55	3 / 6	3 / 6	35	52	67
Malta	1 / 20	0 / 110	1 / 55	2 / 6	2 / 6	29	44	71
Netherlands	0 / 20	4 / 110	5 / 55	13 / 26	12 / 26	29	46	66
Poland	2 / 20	7 / 110	2 / 55	18 / 51	31 / 51	34	56	79
Portugal	1 / 20	5 / 110	1 / 55	10 / 21	12 / 21	27	49	66
Romania	0 / 20	7 / 110	3 / 55	7 / 32	22 / 32	33	49	67
Slovakia	1 / 20	1 / 110	0 / 55	2 / 13	11 / 13	34	49	65
Slovenia	0 / 20	0 / 110	0 / 55	4 / 8	3 / 8	30	50	59
Spain	0 / 20	11 / 110	6 / 55	26 / 54	32 / 54	25	20	74
Sweden	0 / 20	2 / 110	3 / 55	11 / 20	16 / 20	32	45	58

== Delegations ==
Delegations are established to maintain and develop relations with entities the European Parliament has an interest to cooperate with. Among these are countries that EU has close (especially trade) relations or countries applying expected to join the EU. The EP also cooperates with the parliamentary bodies of other international organisations, such as NATO. Delegations have full and substitute members, and elects its own chair. They can be divided in two groups, standing delegations and ad hoc delegations.

=== Delegations to parliamentary assemblies ===
Delegation		Chair		
Delegation for relations with the NATO Parliamentary Assembly	DNAT	EPP	Tom Vandenkendelaere	BEL
Delegation to the African, Caribbean and Pacific Group-EU Joint Parliamentary Assembly	DACP	S&D	Carlos Zorrinho	POR
Delegation to the Euro-Latin American Parliamentary Assembly	DLAT	S&D	Javi López	ESP
Delegation to the Euronest Parliamentary Assembly	DEPA	EPP	Andrius Kubilius	LIT
Delegation to the Euro-Mediterranean Parliamentary Assembly	DMED	S&D	David Sassoli	ITA

=== Joint Parliamentary Committees (JPCs) ===
JPCs are created with bilateral agreement between the EU and the third country.

Delegation		Chair		
Delegation for Northern cooperation and for relations with Switzerland and Norway and to the EU-Iceland Joint Parliamentary Committee and the European Economic Area (EEA) Joint Parliamentary Committee	DEEA	EPP	Andreas Schwab	GER
Delegation for relations with Bosnia and Herzegovina and Kosovo	DSEE	G/EFA	Romeo Franz	GER
Delegation for relations with the Maghreb countries and the Arab Maghreb Union, including the EU-Morocco, EU-Tunisia and EU-Algeria Joint Parliamentary Committees	DMAG	S&D	Andrea Cozzolino	ITA
Delegation to the CARIFORUM-EU Parliamentary Committee	DCAR	RE	Stéphane Bijoux	FRA
Delegation to the EU-Albania Stabilisation and Association Parliamentary Committee	D-AL	EPP	Manolis Kefalogiannis	GRE
Delegation to the EU-Chile Joint Parliamentary Committee	D-CL	S&D	Inmaculada Rodríguez-Piñero	ESP
Delegation to the EU-Mexico Joint Parliamentary Committee	D-MX	S&D	Massimiliano Smeriglio	ITA
Delegation to the EU-Moldova Parliamentary Association Committee	D-MD	EPP	Siegfried Mureșan	ROM
Delegation to the EU-Montenegro Stabilisation and Association Parliamentary Committee	D-ME	EPP	Vladimír Bilčík	SVK
Delegation to the EU-North Macedonia Joint Parliamentary Committee	D-MK	S&D	Andreas Schieder	AUT
Delegation to the EU-Serbia Stabilisation and Association Parliamentary Committee	D-RS	S&D	Tanja Fajon	SLO
Delegation to the EU-Turkey Joint Parliamentary Committee	D-TR	G/EFA	Sergey Lagodinsky	GER
Delegation to the EU-UK Parliamentary Partnership Assembly	D-UK	RE	Nathalie Loiseau	FRA
Delegation to the EU-Ukraine Parliamentary Association Committee	D-UA	ECR	Witold Waszczykowski	POL

=== Parliamentary Cooperations Committees (PCCs) ===
Delegation		Chair		
Delegation to the EU-Armenia Parliamentary Partnership Committee, the EU-Azerbaijan Parliamentary Cooperation Committee and the EU-Georgia Parliamentary Association Committee	DSCA	S&D	Marina Kaljurand	EST
Delegation to the EU-Kazakhstan, EU-Kyrgyzstan, EU-Uzbekistan and EU-Tajikistan Parliamentary Cooperation Committees and for relations with Turkmenistan and Mongolia	DCAS	EPP	Fulvio Martusciello	ITA
Delegation to the EU-Russia Parliamentary Cooperation Committee	D-RU	ECR	Ryszard Czarnecki	POL

=== Bilateral and multilateral relations delegations ===
Delegation		Chair		
Delegation for relations with Afghanistan	D-AF	RE	Petras Auštrevičius	LIT
Delegation for relations with Australia and New Zealand	DANZ	RE	Ulrike Müller	GER
Delegation for relations with Belarus	D-BY	S&D	Robert Biedroń	POL
Delegation for relations with Brazil	D-BR	EPP	José Manuel Fernandes	POR
Delegation for relations with Canada	D-CA	RE	Stéphanie Yon-Courtin	FRA
Delegation for relations with India	D-IN	RE	Søren Gade	DEN
Delegation for relations with Iran	D-IR	GUE/NGL	Cornelia Ernst	GER
Delegation for relations with Iraq	D-IQ	EPP	Sara Skyttedal	SWE
Delegation for relations with Israel	D-IL	EPP	Antonio López-Istúriz White	ESP
Delegation for relations with Japan	D-JP	S&D	Christel Schaldemose	DEN
Delegation for relations with Mercosur	DMER	RE	Jordi Cañas Pérez	ESP
Delegation for relations with Palestine	DPAL	GUE/NGL	Manu Pineda	ESP
Delegation for relations with South Africa	D-ZA	EPP	Magdalena Adamowicz	POL
Delegation for relations with the Arabian Peninsula	DARP	G/EFA	Hannah Neumann	GER
Delegation for relations with the countries of Central America	DCAM	G/EFA	Tilly Metz	LUX
Delegation for relations with the countries of South Asia	DSAS	ECR	Nicola Procaccini	ITA
Delegation for relations with the countries of Southeast Asia and the Association of Southeast Asian Nations (ASEAN)	DASE	EPP	Daniel Caspary	GER
Delegation for relations with the countries of the Andean Community	DAND	EPP	Pilar del Castillo	ESP
Delegation for relations with the Korean Peninsula	DKOR	EPP	Lukas Mandl	AUT
Delegation for relations with the Mashriq countries	DMAS	S&D	Isabel Santos	POR
Delegation for relations with the Pan-African Parliament	DPAP	RE	María Soraya Rodríguez Ramos	ESP
Delegation for relations with the People's Republic of China	D-CN	G/EFA	Reinhard Bütikofer	GER
Delegation for relations with the United States	D-US	EPP	Radosław Sikorski	POL

== Secretariat ==
The composition of the rest of Secretariat is appointed by the Parliament Bureau, headed by the Secretary General.

- Secretary General: (Germany) Klaus Welle
- Deputy Secretary General: (Germany) Markus Winkler
- The Cabinet of the Secretary General
  - Director: (Germany) Susanne Altenberg
- Legal Service
  - Head: (France) Freddy Drexler
- Directorates General.

Other services that assist the Secretariat:

- Secretariat of the Bureau and Quaestors
- Secretariat of the Conference of Presidents
- Directorate for Relations with Political Groups
- Internal Audit Unit
- Eco-Management and Audit Scheme Unit (EMAS)
- Management Team Support Office
- Business Continuity Management Unit
- Data Protection Service

=== Directorates General ===
Directorate General		Director General
Directorate Generale for the Presidency	DG PRES	(Germany) Markus Winkler
Directorate General for Internal Policies of the Union	DG IPOL	(Italy) Riccardo Ribera d'Alcalá
Directorate General for External Policies of the Union	DG EXPO	(Italy) Pietro Ducci
Directorate General for Communication	DG COMM	(Spain) Jaume Duch Guillot
Directorate General for Parliamentary Research Services	DG EPRS	
Directorate General for Personnel	DG PERS	(Denmark) Kristian Knudsen
Directorate General for Infrastructure and Logistics	DG INLO	(Finland) Leena Maria Linnus
Directorate General for Translation	DG TRAD	(Slovenia) Valter Mavrič
Directorate General for Logistics and Interpretation for Conferences	DG LINC	(Poland) Agnieszka Walter-Drop
Directorate General for Finance	DG FINS	(France) Didier Klethi
Directorate General for Innovation and Technological Support	DG ITEC	(Belgium) Walter Petrucci (Acting)
Directorate General for Security	DG SAFE	(Italy) Elio Carozza

== 2019 elections results ==
The 2019 European Parliament election took place from 23 to 26 May 2019.

2019 results by political group
Group (2019–24)		Seats 2019	Outgoing seats	∆
EPP	European People's Party (Christian democrats and liberal conservatives)	182	216	▼ −34
S&D	Progressive Alliance of Socialists and Democrats (Social democrats)	154	185	▼ −31
RE	Renew Europe (Social liberals and conservative liberals)	108	69	▲ +39
Greens/EFA	Greens/European Free Alliance (Greens and regionalists)	74	52	▲ +22
ID	Identity and Democracy (Right-wing populists and nationalists)	73	36	▲ +37
ECR	European Conservatives and Reformists (National conservatives and sovereignists)	62	77	▼ −15
GUE/NGL	European United Left–Nordic Green Left (Democratic socialists and communists)	41	52	▼ −11
NI	Non-attached	57	20	▲ +37
EFDD	Europe of Freedom and Direct Democracy (Populists and hard eurosceptics)	–	42	▼ −42
Vacant	N/A	0	2	—N/a
Total		751	751	Steady

Notes on changes in groups

- Alliance of Liberals and Democrats for Europe was succeeded by Renew Europe.
- Europe of Nations and Freedom was disbanded and largely replaced by Identity and Democracy.
- Europe of Freedom and Direct Democracy did not form in the Ninth Parliament.

=== Results by country ===
State	Political groups																MEPs
State	EPP (EPP, ECPM)		S&D (PES)		RE (ALDE, EDP)		ECR (ECR, ECPM)		GUE/NGL (EL, NGLA, EACL)		G/EFA (EGP, EFA)		ID (EAPN)		NI		MEPs
Austria	7 (ÖVP)	+2	5 (SPÖ)	=	1 (NEOS)	=					2 (Grüne)	−1	3 (FPÖ)	−1			18
Belgium	2 (CD&V); 1 (CDH); 1 (CSP)	= = =	2 (PS); 1 (SP.A)	−1 =	2 (Open VLD); 2 (MR)	−1 −1	3 (N-VA)	−1	1 (PTB)	+1	2 (ECOLO); 1 (Groen)	+1 =	3 (VB)	+2			21
Bulgaria	6 (GERB); 1 (DSB)	= +1	5 (BSP)	+1	3 (DPS)	−1	2 (IMRO)	+1									17
Croatia	4 (HDZ)	−1	3 (SDP)	+1	1 (AMS/IDS)	−1	1 (HKS)	=							1 (Human Shield); 1 (Kolakušić)	+1	11
Cyprus	2 (DISY)	=	1 (EDEK); 1 (DIKO)	= =					2 (AKEL)	=							6
Czech Republic	2+1 (TOP 09+STAN); 2 (KDU–ČSL)	−1 −1			6 (ANO)	+2	4 (ODS)	+2	1 (KSČM)	−2	3 (Piráti)	+3	2 (SPD)	+2			21
Denmark	1 (C)	=	3 (S)	=	3 (V); 2 (B)	+1 +1			1 (RG)	+1	2 (SF)	+1	1 (O)	−3			13
France	7 (LR); 1 (LC)	−12	2 (PS); 2 (PP); 1 (ND)	−8	10 (LREM); 5 (MoDem); 1 (MR); 1 (Agir); 4 (Ind.)	+21			5 (FI); 1 (GRS)	+6	8 (EELV); 2 (AEI); 1 (PNC); 1 (Ind.)	+6	20 (RN); 2 (Ind.)	−2			74
Estonia			2 (SDE)	+1	2 (RE); 1 (KE)	= =							1 (EKRE)	+1			6
Finland	3 (Kok.)	=	2 (SDP)	=	2 (Kesk.); 1 (SFP)	−1 =			1 (Vas.)	=	2 (VIHR)	+1	2 (PS)	=			13
Germany	23 (CDU); 6 (CSU)	−5 +1	16 (SPD)	−11	5 (FDP); 2 (FW)	+2 +1	1 (Familie)	=	5 (Linke); 1 (Tierschutz)	−2 =	21 (B’90/Grüne); 1 (ÖDP); 1 (Piraten); 1 (Volt Europa); 1 (Die Partei)	+10 = = +1 +1	11 (AfD)	+4	1 (Die Partei)	=	96
Greece	8 (ND)	+3	2 (KINAL)	=			1 (Greek Solution)	+1	6 (SYRIZA)	=					2 (KKE); 2 (XA)	= =	21
Hungary	12+1 (Fidesz+KDNP)	+1	1 (MSZP); 4 (DK)	−1 +2	2 (MoMo)	+2									1 (Jobbik)	−2	21
(Republic of Ireland) Ireland	4 (FG)	=			1 (FF)	=			2 (I4C); 1 (SF); 1 (Flanagan)	+2 −2 =	2 (GP)	+2					11
Italy	6 (FI); 1 (SVP)	−7 =	19 (PD)	−12			5 (FdI)	+5					28 (Lega)	+23	14 (M5S)	−3	73
Latvia	2 (JV)	−2	2 (Saskaņa SDP)	+1	1 (AP!)	+1	2 (NA)	+1			1 (LKS)	=					8
Lithuania	3 (TS–LKD); 1 (Maldeikienė)	+1 +1	2 (LSDP)	=	1 (DP); 1 (LRLS)	= −1	1 (LLRA)	=			2 (LVŽS)	+1					11
Luxembourg	2 (CSV)	−1	1 (LSAP)	=	2 (DP)	+1					1 (Gréng)	=					6
Malta	2 (PN)	−1	4 (PL)	+1													6
Netherlands	4 (CDA); 1 (50+); 1 (CU)	−1 +1 +1	6 (PvdA)	+3	2 (D66); 4 (VVD)	−2 +1	3 (FvD); 1 (SGP)	= +1	1 (PvdD)	=	3 (GL)	+1					26
Poland	14 (PO); 3 (PSL)	−5 −1	5 (SLD); 3 (WIOSNA)	= +3			25 (PiS); 1 (SP)	+6 +1									51
Portugal	6 (PSD); 1 (CDS–PP)	= =	9 (PS)	+1					2 (CDU: PCP); 2 (BE)	−1 +1	1 (PAN)	+1					21
Romania	10 (PNL); 2 (UDMR); 2 (PMP)	−1 = =	8 (PSD); 2 (PRO Romania)	−8 +2	8 (USR-PLUS)	+8											32
Slovakia	2 (SPOLU); 1 (KDH); 1 (OĽaNO)	+2 −1 =	3 (Smer–SD)	−1	2 (PS)	+2	2 (SaS)	+1							2 (ĽSNS)	+2	13
Slovenia	2+1 (SDS+SLS); 1 (NSi)	−1 =	2 (SD)	+1	2 (LMS)	+2											8
Spain	12 (PP)	−4	20 (PSOE)	+6	7 (C's); 1 (CEUS/EAJ/PNV)	+1 =	3 (VOX)	+3	2 (UP/Podemos); 2 (UP/IU); 1 (UP/Ind.); 1 (AR/EH Bildu)	−5	2 (AR/ERC); 1 (UP/ICV)	=			2 (JuntsxCat)	+2	54
Sweden	4 (M); 2 (KD)	+1 +1	5 (S)	=	2 (C); 1 (L)	+1 −1	3 (SD)	+1	1 (V)	=	2 (MP)	−2					20
United Kingdom			10 (Lab)	−10	16 (LibDem); 1 (Alliance Party)	+15 +1	4 (Con)	−15	1 (SF)	=	7 (Green); 3 (SNP); 1 (PC)	+4 +1 =			29 (Brexit Party); 1 (DUP)	+29 =	73
Total																	MEPs
Total	EPP		S&D		RE		ECR		GUE/NGL		G/EFA		ID		NI		MEPs
Total	182 (24.2%)	−39	154 (20.5%)	−37	108 (14.4%)	+41	62 (8.2%)	−8	41 (5.5%)	−11	75 (10.0%)	+25	73 (9.7%)	+73	57 (7.5%)	−36	751
