= Vital Moreira =

Portuguese jurist and politician (born 1944)

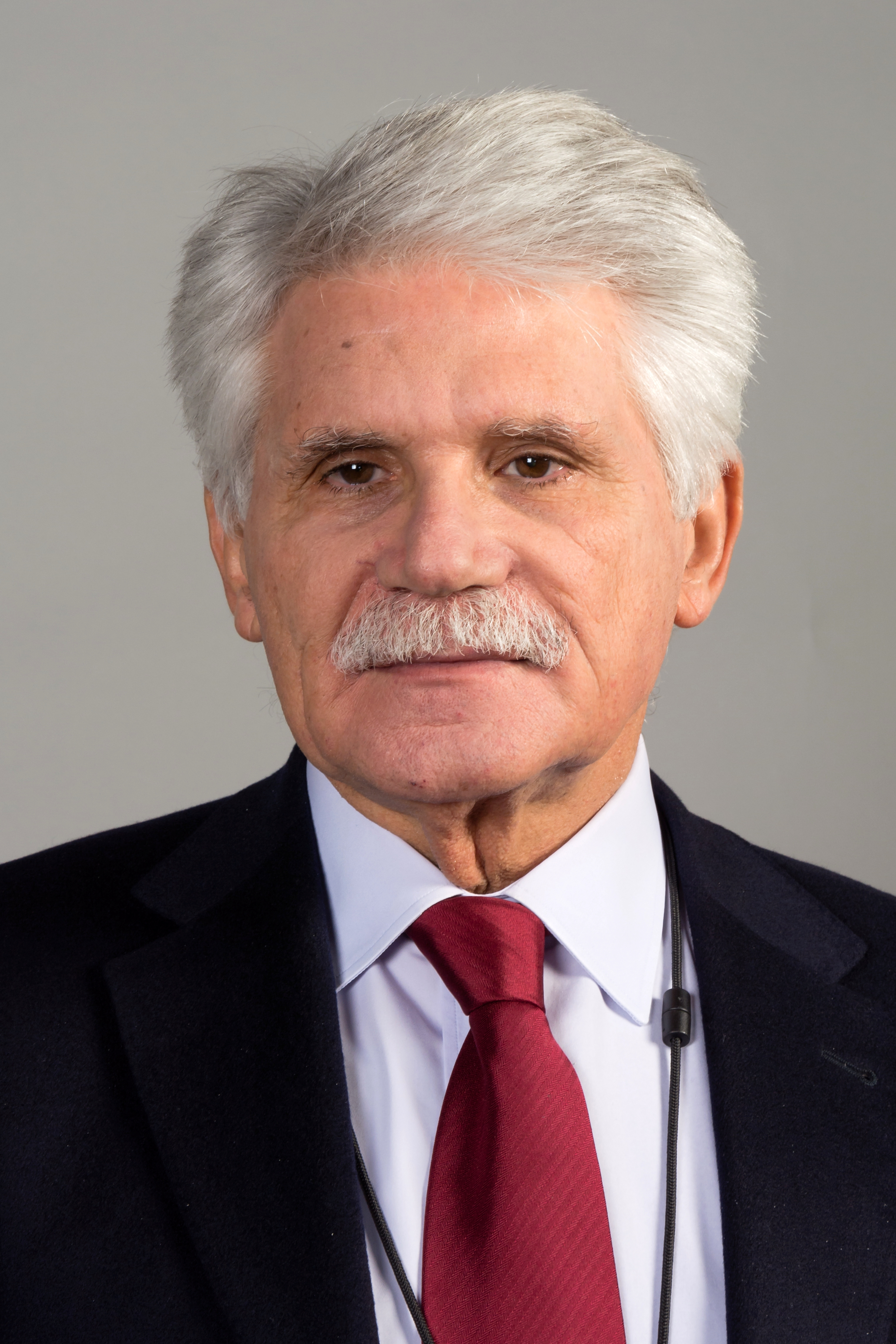
- Official portrait, 2014

Member of the European Parliament for Portugal
- In office 14 July 2009 – 30 June 2014

Member of the Assembly of the Republic
- In office 27 October 1995 – 24 October 1999
- Constituency: Coimbra
- In office 2 June 1975 – 5 April 1983
- Constituency: Coimbra (1975–1976); Lisbon (1976–1979); Aveiro (1979–1983)

Judge of the Constitutional Court
- In office 6 April 1983 – 2 August 1989
- Appointed by: Assembly of the Republic
- Preceded by: Office established
- Succeeded by: José de Sousa e Brito

Personal details
- Born: Vital Martins Moreira; 8 November 1944 (age 81) Anadia, Portugal
- Party: PS (since 1995)
- Other political affiliations: PCP (1974–1990)
- Spouse: Maria Manuel Leitão Marques (m. 1987)
- Education: University of Coimbra
- Occupation: Jurist • Professor • Politician

Vital Martins Moreira (born 8 November 1944) is a university professor, legal expert and Portuguese politician.

== Academic career ==
He is a retired professor at the Faculty of Law of the University of Coimbra (FDUC), where he previously graduated in Law and obtained a PhD in Legal and Political Sciences, with a thesis on the institutional organisation and regulation of Port Wine. Among other subjects, he taught Constitutional Law, Administrative Law, Public Economic Law, European Union Law, Human Rights.

He was a judge at the Constitutional Court (1983-1989). He was also a member of the "Venice Commission" of the Council of Europe (1999-2003). He chaired the Committee for Projects for the Celebrations of the Centenary of the Republic (2007-2008).

== Political career ==
Having participated in the democratic opposition to the Estado Novo since the (undemocratic) elections of 1969, Vital Moreira made his debut in active politics after the 25th of April 1974. He was then a member of the Portuguese Communist Party, which elected him a member of the Constituent Assembly (1975-1976) and then a member of the Assembly of the Republic (1976-1982). In the late 1980s, he was one of the members of the "group of six" that broke with the PCP (1987-1990).

In 1995-1997, he returned to Parliament as an independent member elected by the Socialist Party. In 2009, he accepted José Sócrates' invitation to head the PS list for the European elections. As a member of the European Parliament (2009-2014), he was chairman of the Committee on International Trade.

== Personal life ==
He is married to fellow PS politician, and his former student, Maria Manuel Leitão Marques, since 1987.
