= Maria Manuel Leitão Marques =

Portuguese politician

- Leitão Marques in 2019

Member of the European Parliament
- In office 2 July 2019 – 15 July 2024
- Constituency: Portugal

Minister of the Presidency and of Administrative Modernisation
- In office 26 November 2015 – 18 February 2019
- Prime Minister: António Costa
- Preceded by: Rui Medeiros
- Succeeded by: Mariana Vieira da Silva

Secretary of State of Administrative Modernisation
- In office 17 May 2007 – 21 June 2011
- Prime Minister: José Sócrates
- Minister: Pedro Silva Pereira

Member of the Assembly of the Republic
- In office 23 October 2015 – 1 July 2019
- Constituency: Viseu

Personal details
- Born: 23 August 1952 (age 74) Quelimane, Portuguese Mozambique
- Party: Socialist Party
- Spouse: Vital Moreira (m. 1987)
- Education: University of Coimbra
- Occupation: Jurist • Politician

Maria Manuel Leitão Marques (born 23 August 1952) is a Portuguese politician of the Socialist Party who has been serving as a Member of the European Parliament since 2019. She previously served as Minister of the Presidency and of Administrative Modernisation in the cabinet of Prime Minister António Costa.

== Career in national politics ==
From 2015 until 2019, Leitão Marques represented the Viseu constituency in the Assembly of the Republic. Marques was the Secretary of State for the Administrative Modernization under the XVIII and XVIII Constitutional Government of Portugal.

== Member of the European Parliament, 2019–2024 ==
In the 2019 European elections, Leitão Marques ran on the list of Prime Minister António Costa's Socialist Party. She has since been serving as vice chair of the Committee on the Internal Market and Consumer Protection. In this capacity, she is the parliament’s rapporteur on the European Commission’s 2022 proposal for a ban on the import and export of products made using forced labour.

In addition to her committee assignments, Leitão Marques is a member of the European Parliament Intergroup on Artificial Intelligence and Digital.
