= Nuno Morais Sarmento =

Portuguese politician (1961–2026)

Minister of the Presidency
- In office 6 April 2002 – 12 March 2005
- Preceded by: Guilherme d'Oliveira Martins
- Succeeded by: Pedro Silva Pereira

Member of the Assembly of the Republic of Portugal for Castelo Branco
- In office 10 March 2005 – 14 October 2009

Personal details
- Born: Nuno Albuquerque; Morais Sarmento; 31 January 1961 Lisbon, Portugal
- Died: 7 March 2026 (aged 65) Lisbon, Portugal
- Party: PSD
- Education: Catholic University of Portugal
- Occupation: Lawyer

Nuno Albuquerque de Morais Sarmento (31 January 1961 – 7 March 2026) was a Portuguese politician of the Social Democratic Party (PSD).

Sarmento served as Minister of the Presidency from 2002 to 2005 and was a member of the Assembly of the Republic from 2005 to 2009.

Sarmento died in Lisbon on 7 March 2026, at the age of 65.
