= António Leitão Amaro =

Portuguese politician (born 1980)

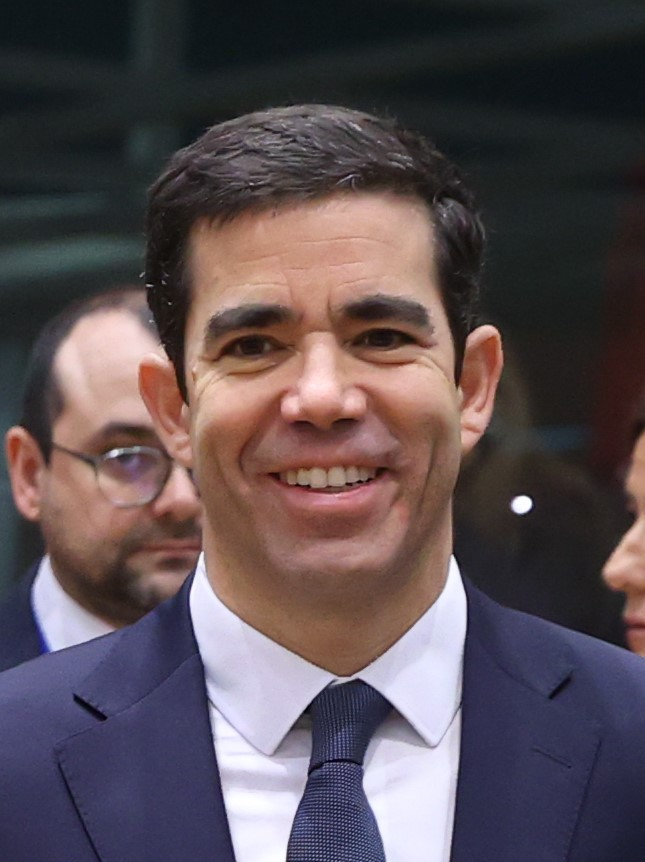
- Leitão Amaro in 2024

Minister of the Presidency
- Incumbent
- Assumed office 2 April 2024
- Prime Minister: Luís Montenegro
- Preceded by: Mariana Vieira da Silva

Secretary of State for Local Administration
- In office 23 April 2013 – 30 October 2015
- Prime Minister: Pedro Passos Coelho
- Minister: Miguel Poiares Maduro

Member of the Assembly of the Republic
- In office 26 March 2024 – 2 April 2024
- Constituency: Viseu
- In office 15 October 2009 – 24 October 2019
- Constituency: Lisbon (2009–2015); Viseu (2015–2019)

President of the Tondela Municipal Assembly
- In office 18 October 2021 – 1 April 2024

Personal details
- Born: António Egrejas Leitão Amaro; 2 April 1980 (age 46) Tondela, Portugal
- Party: Social Democratic Party
- Other political affiliations: Social Democratic Youth (until 2010)
- Education: University of Lisbon; Harvard Law School
- Occupation: Lawyer • politician

António Egrejas Leitão Amaro (born 2 April 1980) is a Portuguese jurist and politician. He has been Minister of Presidency since 2024, in the XXIV Constitutional Government, led by Luís Montenegro.

== Political career ==
Leitão Amaro was a member of the Assembly of the Republic for the constituencies of Viseu and Lisbon from 2009 to 2019.

Leitão Amaro was Secretary of State for Local Administration in the XIX Constitutional Government between April 2013 and October 2015. He serves as vice-president of the Social Democratic Party, since 2022, appointed by Luís Montenegro.

In January 2024, Leitão Amaro was announced as candidate number one, on Democratic Alliance's Viseu list for the 2024 legislative elections.

== Political positions ==
Leitão Amaro is a supporter of same-sex marriage and same-sex adoption.
