= Mariana Vieira da Silva =

Portuguese politician (born 1978)

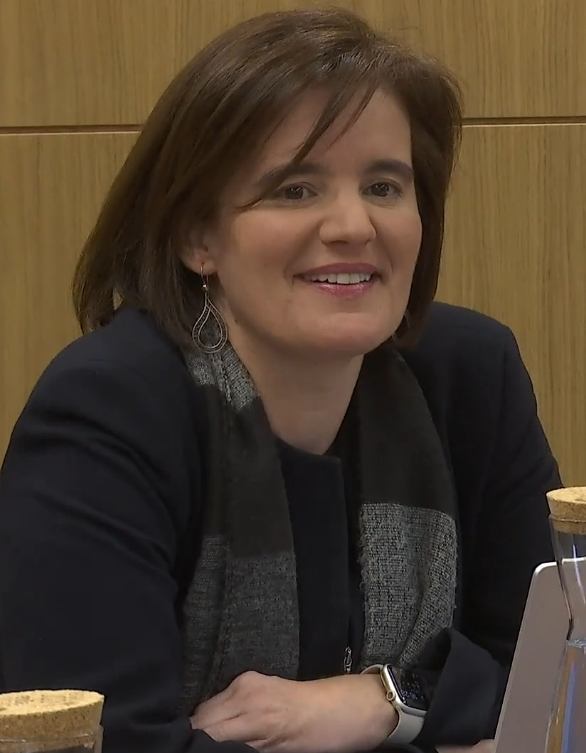
- Vieira da Silva in 2023

Minister of the Presidency
- In office 26 October 2019 – 2 April 2024
- Prime Minister: António Costa
- Preceded by: Herself (as Minister of the Presidency and Administrative Modernisation)
- Succeeded by: António Leitão Amaro

Minister of the Presidency and Administrative Modernisation
- In office 18 February 2019 – 26 October 2019
- Prime Minister: António Costa
- Preceded by: Maria Manuel Leitão Marques
- Succeeded by: Herself (as Minister of the Presidency); Alexandra Leitão (as Minister for Administrative Modernisation)

Secretary of State Adjunct to the Prime Minister
- In office 26 November 2015 – 18 February 2019
- Prime Minister: António Costa
- Preceded by: Carlos Moedas
- Succeeded by: Duarte Cordeiro

Member of the Assembly of the Republic
- Incumbent
- Assumed office 26 March 2024
- Constituency: Lisbon

Personal details
- Born: 8 May 1978 (age 48) Lisbon, Portugal
- Party: Socialist Party
- Relatives: José António Vieira da Silva (father)
- Education: ISCTE – University Institute of Lisbon

Mariana Guimarães Vieira da Silva (born 8 May 1978) is a Portuguese sociologist and politician who served as Minister of the Presidency in António Costa's XXIII Constitutional Government, effectively in second in the government.

== Early life and education ==
Mariana Vieira da Silva is the daughter of politician José António Vieira da Silva, himself a government minister in the Socialist cabinets of José Sócrates and António Costa, and economist Margarida Guimarães. She has a brother, Miguel Vieira da Silva, who is a musician. In her youth, between the ages of 9 and 19, Vieira da Silva was a competitive swimmer for Sporting CP, specialising in the demanding 200 metres butterfly stroke.

Vieira da Silva earned a licentiate degree in Sociology from ISCTE – University Institute of Lisbon, in 2002, and has not yet concluded her doctorate in Public Policy (she has finished the coursework but has not yet presented her dissertation on the subject of health and education policies in Portugal).

== Political career ==
Around the time of the campaign for the 2002 legislative election, Vieira da Silva joined the Socialist Party's political movement Movimento Imaginar Portugal; she became a member of the party shortly after that year's electoral loss. From 2005 to 2009, she worked in an advisory capacity in the office of the Minister of Education Maria de Lurdes Rodrigues. From 2009 to 2011, Vieira da Silva served in an adjunct capacity in the office of the Secretary of State Adjunct to the Prime Minister, José Almeida Ribeiro.

In November 2015, Vieira da Silva became part of the XXI Constitutional Government as Secretary of State Adjunct to the Prime Minister, until February 2019, when she replaced Maria Manuel Leitão Marques (elected Member of the European Parliament) as Minister of the Presidency and of Administrative Modernisation.
