= Presidency of the Council of Ministers (Portugal) =

- Presidência do Conselho de Ministros
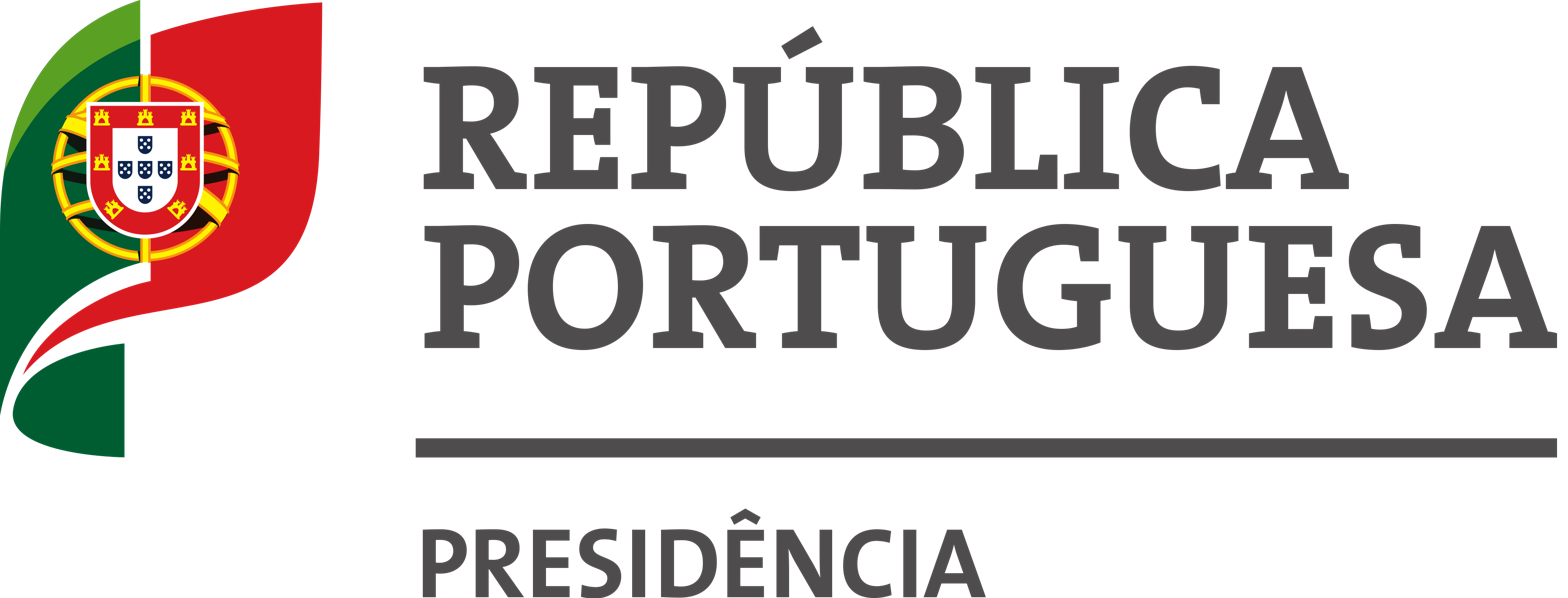

Ministry overview
- Formed: 2 August 1950
- Jurisdiction: Government of Portugal
- Headquarters: Rua Prof. Gomes Teixeira, Campo de Ourique, Lisbon
- Minister responsible: António Leitão Amaro, Minister of the Presidency
- Website: portugal.gov.pt/presidencia

The Presidency of the Council of Ministers (Portuguese: Presidência do Conselho de Ministros) is the cabinet department of the Government of Portugal. Its mission is to provide support to the Council of Ministers, the Prime Minister and the other members of the cabinet organically integrated in the department. It is also responsible for the promotion of inter-ministerial coordination of the various government departments, and it integrates miscellaneous services that are in the direct dependence of the Prime Minister or that do not sit well in other departments.

The department is headed by the Minister of the Presidency (Portuguese: Ministro da Presidência), who is generically responsible for the coordination of inter-ministerial policies and objectives. The current Minister of the Presidency, since 2024, is António Leitão Amaro.

The Minister of the Presidency often takes on responsibility for areas of policy which are the priority of the Government of the time. At present, the Organic Law of the XXIV Constitutional Government charges the Minister of the Presidency with policy in the areas of migration governance and public administration, namely the management of the civil service and public services.

== History ==
The Presidency of the Council of Ministers grew as an executive superstructure with the beginning of the Estado Novo regime, especially after the Constitution of 1933 came into force, as a mechanism to centralise political power and reinforce government authority. The 1950s and 1960s saw a growing government bureaucracy to overcome the new challenges in economic policy, public safety and national defence, in the context of the post-war international situation, of Portugal's NATO membership, and of the Colonial War.

In 1950, in the context of a government reshuffle, the new position of Minister of the Presidency was created; the Minister was responsible for the oversight and management of the services directly dependent of the Prime Minister (at the time known by the official title of "President of the Council of Ministers").

Since then, the position of Minister of the Presidency ceased to be in use in four distinct periods: 1961–1987, 1995, 1997–1999, and 2011–2013. In other periods, the position changed its name due to the incumbent accumulating further responsibilities: between 2013 and 2015, it was called Minister of the Presidency and Parliamentary Affairs (Ministro da Presidência e dos Assuntos Parlamentares), briefly, in 2015, it was called Minister of the Presidency and Regional Development (Ministro da Presidência e do Desenvolvimento Regional), between 2015 and 2019, Minister of the Presidency and Administrative Modernisation (Ministro da Presidência e da Modernização Administrativa), and, between 2019 and 2022, Minister of State and the Presidency (Ministra de Estado e da Presidência).

== Current organisation ==
In accordance with the Organic Law of the XXIV Constitutional Government, the Presidency of the Council of Ministers comprises the following members of the Government:

- Minister of the Presidency
  - Secretary of State for the Presidency of the Council of Ministers
  - Secretary of State Adjunct for the Presidency
- Minister in the Cabinet of the Prime Minister and for Territorial Cohesion
  - Secretary of State for Planning and Regional Development
  - Secretary of State for Local Administration and Land Planning
- Minister of Parliamentary Affairs
  - Secretary of State Adjunct for Parliamentary Affairs
  - Secretary of State for Sport
- Minister of Infrastructure and Housing
  - Secretary of State for Infrastructure
  - Secretary of State for Mobility
  - Secretary of State for Housing
- Minister of Youth and Modernisation
  - Secretary of State Adjunct and for Equality
  - Secretary of State for Modernisation and Digitalisation

The Presidency of the Council of Ministers also provides support to the dependent services of the Prime Minister, as well as those of the Minister of the Presidency, Minister in the Cabinet of the Prime Minister and for Territorial Cohesion, Minister of Parliamentary Affairs, Minister of Infrastructure and Housing, and the Minister of Culture.

== List of ministers (since 1974) ==
#	Portrait	Name	Took office	Left office	Party	Prime Minister
1		Fernando Nogueira (b. 1950)	17 August 1987	16 March 1995	PSD	Aníbal Cavaco Silva
–	Vacant office As Minister Adjuct: Luís Marques Mendes (1995)		16 March 1995	28 October 1995		Aníbal Cavaco Silva
2		António Vitorino (b. 1957)	28 October 1995	25 November 1997	PS	António Guterres
–	Vacant office As Minister Adjunct: José Sócrates (1997–1999)		25 November 1997	25 October 1999		António Guterres
3		Jorge Coelho (1954–2021)	25 October 1999	14 September 2000	PS	António Guterres
4		Guilherme d'Oliveira Martins (b. 1957)	14 September 2000	6 April 2002	Ind.	António Guterres
5		Nuno Morais Sarmento (1961–2026)	6 April 2002	12 March 2005	PSD	José Durão Barroso
5		Nuno Morais Sarmento (1961–2026)	6 April 2002	12 March 2005	PSD	Pedro Santana Lopes
6		Pedro Silva Pereira (b. 1962)	12 March 2005	21 June 2011	PS	José Sócrates
–	Vacant office As Minister Adjunct: Miguel Relvas (2011–2013)		21 June 2011	13 April 2013		Pedro Passos Coelho
7		Luís Marques Guedes (b. 1957)	13 April 2013	26 November 2015	PSD	Pedro Passos Coelho
8		Maria Manuel Leitão Marques (b. 1952)	26 November 2015	18 February 2019	PS	António Costa
9		Mariana Vieira da Silva (b. 1978)	18 February 2019	2 April 2024	PS	António Costa
10		António Leitão Amaro (b. 1980)	2 April 2024	present	PSD	Luís Montenegro
