= Romeo Franz =

German musician, human rights activist and politician (born 1966)

Romeo Franz MEP
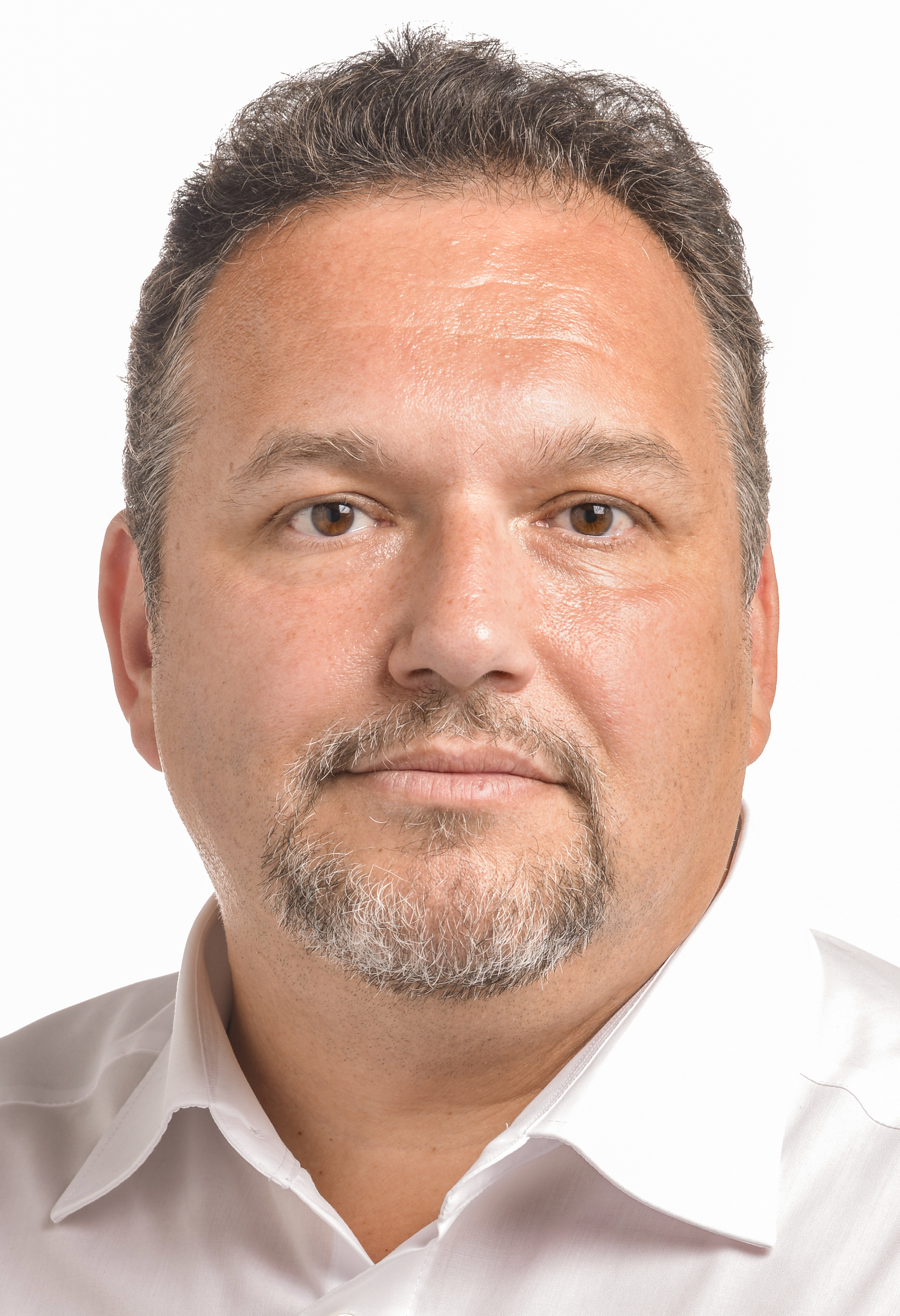

Member of the European Parliament for Germany
- Incumbent
- Assumed office 3 July 2018

Personal details
- Born: October 28, 1966 (age 59) Kaiserslautern, West Germany
- Party: German; Alliance 90/The Greens; EU; European Green Party

Romeo Peter Schischo Franz (born 28 October 1966) is a German musician, human rights activist and politician of Alliance 90/The Greens who has been serving as a Member of the European Parliament since 3 July 2018. From 2003 until 2013, he was a board member of the Central Council of German Sinti and Roma.

In addition to his committee assignments, Franz is a member of the European Parliament Intergroup on LGBT Rights and the European Parliament Anti-Racism and Diversity Intergroup.
