= Pedro Silva Pereira =

Portuguese politician, lawyer and legal expert

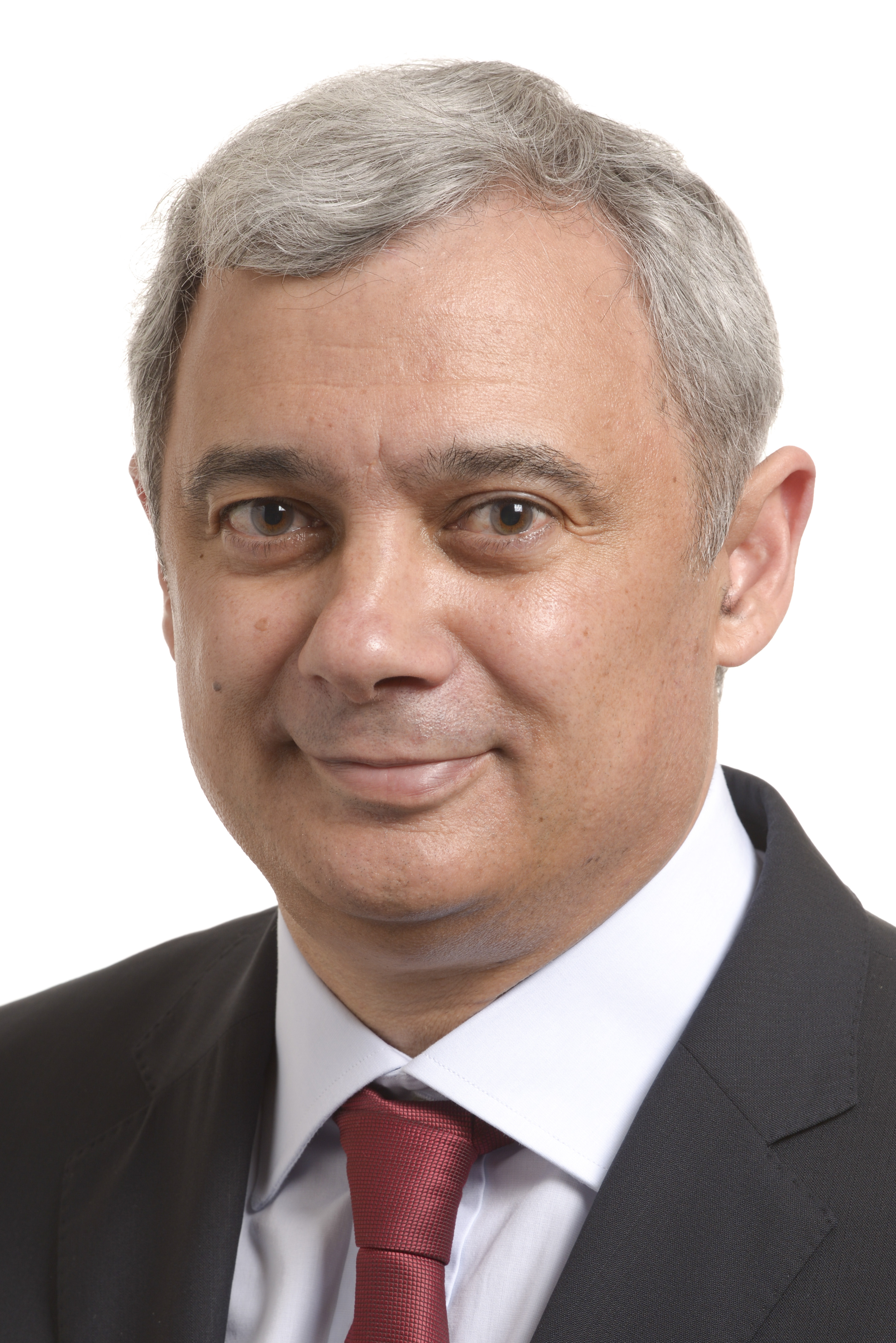
- Official portrait as an MEP, 2014

Vice-President of the European Parliament
- In office 3 July 2019 – 15 July 2024 Serving with See List
- President: David Sassoli; Roberta Metsola

Member of the European Parliament
- In office 1 July 2014 – 15 July 2024
- Parliamentary group: S&D
- Constituency: Portugal

Minister of the Presidency
- In office 12 March 2005 – 21 June 2011
- Prime Minister: José Sócrates
- Preceded by: Nuno Morais Sarmento
- Succeeded by: Luís Marques Guedes

Secretary of State of Spatial Planning and Nature Conservation
- In office 28 October 1999 – 6 April 2002
- Prime Minister: António Guterres

Member of the Assembly of the Republic
- In office 2002–2014
- Parliamentary group: Socialist Party
- Constituency: Vila Real
- Website: pedrosilvapereira.pt

Manuel Pedro Cunha da Silva Pereira (15 August 1962), better known as Pedro Silva Pereira, is a Portuguese politician, lawyer and legal expert. He served as a Member of the European Parliament between 2014 and 2024.

== Early life and education ==
Silva Pereira holds a master's degree in Law from the University of Lisbon.

== Political career ==
=== Career in national politics ===
Silva Pereira has been a member of the Socialist Party since 2000. In his home country, he was member of the Portuguese Parliament from 2002 to 2014, Secretary of State of Spatial Planning and Nature Conservation from 1999 to 2002 in António Guterres' second cabinet, and Minister of the Presidency from 2005 to 2011 in José Sócrates' cabinets.

=== Member of the European Parliament, 2014–present ===
Silva Pereira first became a Member of the European Parliament in the 2014 elections. He has since been serving on the Committee on Constitutional Affairs. In 2016, he also joined the Committee on Economic and Monetary Affairs. Between 2014 and 2016, he was briefly a member of the Committee on Development. Since 2021, he has been part of the Parliament's delegation to the Conference on the Future of Europe.

Since the 2019 elections, Silva Pereira has been serving as one of the Parliament's Vice-Presidents; in this capacity, he is part of the Parliament's leadership under President David Sassoli.

In addition to his committee assignments, Silva Pereira has been part of the Parliament's delegation for relations with Japan since 2014.

== Political positions ==
Together with Danuta Hübner, Silva Pereira drafted a 2018 report in which they called on the European Parliament to hold 46 of the 73 seats which will be lost after Brexit in reserve for possible new class of MEPs representing pan-European constitutencies and for countries that might join the EU in the future; their proposal was later rejected by a parliamentary majority.

== Recognition ==
Pereira's work on the EU-Japan Economic Partnership Agreement earned him the Order of the Rising Sun, the country's highest honor, in 2019.
