= List of members of the European Parliament (1999–2004) =

During the fifth term (1999–2004), there were 626 members of parliament divided among the 15 member states. As part of the 2004 enlargement, the national parliaments of the 10 new member states sent a total of 162 observers to the European Parliament from April 2003. On 1 May 2004, upon the countries' accession, the observers became MEPs until the start of the next term (20 July 2004) elected in the June 2004 elections.

== List (by country) ==
Name	National party	EP Group	Country	Constituency
Maria Berger	Social Democratic Party	PES	Austria	Austria
Herbert Bösch	Social Democratic Party	PES	Austria	Austria
Mercedes Echerer	The Greens–The Green Alternative	G–EFA	Austria	Austria
Harald Ettl	Social Democratic Party	PES	Austria	Austria
Marialiese Flemming	People's Party	EPP–ED	Austria	Austria
Gerhard Hager	Freedom Party	NI	Austria	Austria
Wolfgang Ilgenfritz	Freedom Party	NI	Austria	Austria
Othmar Karas	People's Party	EPP–ED	Austria	Austria
Hans Kronberger	Freedom Party	NI	Austria	Austria
Hans-Peter Martin	Social Democratic Party	PES	Austria	Austria
Hubert Pirker	People's Party	EPP–ED	Austria	Austria
Christa Prets	Social Democratic Party	PES	Austria	Austria
Reinhard Rack	People's Party	EPP–ED	Austria	Austria
Daniela Raschhofer	Freedom Party	NI	Austria	Austria
Paul Rübig	People's Party	EPP–ED	Austria	Austria
Karin Scheele	Social Democratic Party	PES	Austria	Austria
Agnes Schierhuber	People's Party	EPP–ED	Austria	Austria
Peter Sichrovsky	Freedom Party	NI	Austria	Austria
Ursula Stenzel	People's Party	EPP–ED	Austria	Austria
Hannes Swoboda	Social Democratic Party	PES	Austria	Austria
Johannes Voggenhuber	The Greens–The Green Alternative	G–EFA	Austria	Austria
Ward Beysen	VLD	NI	Belgium	Dutch-speaking
Peter Bossu	SP	PES	Belgium	Dutch-speaking
Philippe Busquin	PS	PES	Belgium	French-speaking
Willy De Clercq	VLD	ELDR	Belgium	Dutch-speaking
Gérard Deprez	MCC	EPP–ED	Belgium	French-speaking
Claude Desama	PS	PES	Belgium	French-speaking
Karel Dillen	VB	NI	Belgium	Dutch-speaking
Daniel Ducarme	PRL	ELDR	Belgium	French-speaking
Monica Frassoni	ECOLO	G–EFA	Belgium	French-speaking
Mathieu Grosch	CSP	EPP–ED	Belgium	German-speaking
Michel Hansenne	PSC	EPP–ED	Belgium	French-speaking
Pierre Jonckheer	ECOLO	G–EFA	Belgium	French-speaking
Paul Lannoye	ECOLO	G–EFA	Belgium	French-speaking
Nelly Maes	VU / SPIRIT	G–EFA	Belgium	Dutch-speaking
Frédérique Ries	PRL	ELDR	Belgium	French-speaking
Miet Smet	CVP	EPP–ED	Belgium	Dutch-speaking
Bart Staes	VU	G–EFA	Belgium	Dutch-speaking
Dirk Sterckx	VLD	ELDR	Belgium	Dutch-speaking
Patsy Sörensen	AGALEV	G–EFA	Belgium	Dutch-speaking
Freddy Thielemans	PS	PES	Belgium	French-speaking
Marianne Thyssen	CVP	EPP–ED	Belgium	Dutch-speaking
Johan Van Hecke	CVP	EPP–ED	Belgium	Dutch-speaking
Anne Van Lancker	SP	PES	Belgium	Dutch-speaking
Luckas Vander Taelen	AGALEV	G–EFA	Belgium	Dutch-speaking
Frank Vanhecke	VB	NI	Belgium	Dutch-speaking
Ole Andreasen	Left, Liberal Party of Denmark	ELDR	Denmark	Denmark
Freddy Blak	Social Democrats	PES	Denmark	Denmark
Jens-Peter Bonde	June Movement	EDD	Denmark	Denmark
Niels Busk	Left, Liberal Party of Denmark	ELDR	Denmark	Denmark
Mogens Camre	People's Party	UEN	Denmark	Denmark
Lone Dybkjær	Social Liberal Party	ELDR	Denmark	Denmark
Pernille Frahm	Socialist People's Party	EUL-NGL	Denmark	Denmark
Bertel Haarder	Left, Liberal Party of Denmark	ELDR	Denmark	Denmark
Anne Jensen	Left, Liberal Party of Denmark	ELDR	Denmark	Denmark
Ole Krarup	People's Movement against the EU	EUL–NGL	Denmark	Denmark
Torben Lund	Social Democrats	PES	Denmark	Denmark
Jens Okking	June Movement	EDD	Denmark	Denmark
Karin Riis-Jørgensen	Left, Liberal Party of Denmark	ELDR	Denmark	Denmark
Christian Rovsing	Conservative People's Party	EPP–ED	Denmark	Denmark
Ulla Sandbæk	June Movement	EDD	Denmark	Denmark
Helle Thorning-Schmidt	Social Democrats	PES	Denmark	Denmark
Uma Aaltonen	Green League	G–EFA	Finland	Finland
Ulpu Iivari	Social Democratic Party	PES	Finland	Finland
Piia-Noora Kauppi	National Coalition Party	EPP–ED	Finland	Finland
Eija-Riitta Korhola	National Coalition Party	EPP–ED	Finland	Finland
Marjo Matikainen-Kallström	National Coalition Party	EPP–ED	Finland	Finland
Riitta Myller	Social Democratic Party	PES	Finland	Finland
Reino Paasilinna	Social Democratic Party	PES	Finland	Finland
Mikko Pesälä	Centre Party	ELDR	Finland	Finland
Samuli Pohjamo	Centre Party	ELDR	Finland	Finland
Esko Olavi Seppänen	Left Alliance	EUL–NGL	Finland	Finland
Ilkka Suominen	National Coalition Party	EPP–ED	Finland	Finland
Astrid Thors	Swedish People's Party	ELDR	Finland	Finland
Paavo Väyrynen	Centre Party	ELDR	Finland	Finland
Ari Vatanen	National Coalition Party	EPP–ED	Finland	Finland
Kyösti Virrankoski	Centre Party	ELDR	Finland	Finland
Matti Wuori	Green League	G–EFA	Finland	Finland
Alekos Alavanos	Coalition of the Left and Progress	EUL–NGL	Greece	Greece
Konstantinos Alyssandrakis	Communist Party	EUL–NGL	Greece	Greece
Ioannis Averoff	New Democracy	EPP–ED	Greece	Greece
Emmanouil Bakopoulos	Democratic Social Movement	EUL–NGL	Greece	Greece
Alexandros Baltas	Socialist Movement	PES	Greece	Greece
Giorgos Dimitrakopoulos	New Democracy	EPP–ED	Greece	Greece
Petros Efthymiou	Socialist Movement	PES	Greece	Greece
Christos Folias	New Democracy	EPP–ED	Greece	Greece
Konstantinos Hatzidakis	New Democracy	EPP–ED	Greece	Greece
Anna Karamanou	Socialist Movement	PES	Greece	Greece
Giorgos Katiforis	Socialist Movement	PES	Greece	Greece
Efstratios Korakas	Communist Party	EUL–NGL	Greece	Greece
Ioannis Koukiadis	Socialist Movement	PES	Greece	Greece
Dimitrios Koulourianos	Democratic Social Movement	EUL–NGL	Greece	Greece
Rodi Kratsa-Tsagaropoulou	New Democracy	EPP–ED	Greece	Greece
Minerva Melpomeni Malliori	Socialist Movement	PES	Greece	Greece
Ioannis Marinos	New Democracy	EPP–ED	Greece	Greece
Emmanouil Mastorakis	Socialist Movement	PES	Greece	Greece
Mihalis Papagiannakis	Coalition of the Left and Progress	EUL–NGL	Greece	Greece
Ioannis Patakis	Communist Party	EUL–NGL	Greece	Greece
Ioannis Souladakis	Socialist Movement	PES	Greece	Greece
Antonios Trakatellis	New Democracy	EPP–ED	Greece	Greece
Dimitris Tsatsos	Socialist Movement	PES	Greece	Greece
Stavros Xarchakos	New Democracy	EPP–ED	Greece	Greece
Christos Zacharakis	New Democracy	EPP–ED	Greece	Greece
Myrsini Zorba	Socialist Movement	PES	Greece	Greece
Nuala Ahern	Green Party	G–EFA	(Republic of Ireland) Ireland	Leinster
Niall Andrews	Fianna Fáil	UEN	(Republic of Ireland) Ireland	Dublin
Mary Banotti	Fine Gael	EPP–ED	(Republic of Ireland) Ireland	Dublin
Gerry Collins	Fianna Fáil	UEN	(Republic of Ireland) Ireland	Munster
Pat Cox	Independent	ELDR	(Republic of Ireland) Ireland	Munster
Brian Crowley	Fianna Fáil	UEN	(Republic of Ireland) Ireland	Munster
John Cushnahan	Fine Gael	EPP–ED	(Republic of Ireland) Ireland	Munster
Proinsias De Rossa	Labour Party	PES	(Republic of Ireland) Ireland	Dublin
Avril Doyle	Fine Gael	EPP–ED	(Republic of Ireland) Ireland	Leinster
Jim Fitzsimons	Fianna Fáil	UEN	(Republic of Ireland) Ireland	Leinster
Pat "the Cope" Gallagher	Fianna Fáil	UEN	(Republic of Ireland) Ireland	Connacht–Ulster
Liam Hyland	Fianna Fáil	UEN	(Republic of Ireland) Ireland	Leinster
Joe McCartin	Fine Gael	EPP–ED	(Republic of Ireland) Ireland	Connacht–Ulster
Dana Rosemary Scallon	Independent	EPP–ED	(Republic of Ireland) Ireland	Connacht–Ulster
Colette Flesch	Democratic Party	ELDR	Luxembourg	Luxembourg
Robert Goebbels	Socialist Workers' Party	PES	Luxembourg	Luxembourg
Astrid Lulling	Christian Social People's Party	EPP–ED	Luxembourg	Luxembourg
Jacques Poos	Socialist Workers' Party	PES	Luxembourg	Luxembourg
Jacques Santer	Christian Social People's Party	EPP–ED	Luxembourg	Luxembourg
Claude Turmes	The Greens	G-EFA	Luxembourg	Luxembourg

== B ==
- Emmanouil Bakopoulos
- Richard Balfe
- Alexandros Baltas
- Mary Banotti
- Enrique Barón Crespo
- Paolo Bartolozzi
- Regina Bastos
- Juan Bayona de Perogordo
- Christopher Beazley
- Jean-Pierre Bebear
- Bastiaan Belder
- Rolf Berend
- Luis Berenguer Fuster
- Pervenche Berès
- Margrietus van den Berg
- María Bergaz Conesa
- Maria Berger
- Sergio Berlato
- Jean-Louis Bernié
- Georges Berthu
- Fausto Bertinotti
- Ward Beysen
- Roberto Bigliardo
- Freddy Blak
- Johannes Blokland
- Guido Bodrato
- Reimer Böge
- Herbert Bösch
- Christian von Boetticher
- Jens-Peter Bonde
- Emma Bonino
- Johanna Boogerd-Quaak
- Graham Booth
- Armonia Bordes
- Mario Borghezio
- Bob van den Bos
- Enrico Boselli
- Yasmine Boudjenah
- Alima Boumediene-Thiery
- Jean-Louis Bourlanges
- Theodorus Bouwman
- David Bowe
- John Bowis
- Philip Bradbourn
- Cees Bremmer
- Hiltrud Breyer
- André Brie
- Giuseppe Brienza
- Elmar Brok
- Renato Brunetta
- Kathalijne Buitenweg
- Hans Bullmann
- Ieke van den Burg
- Philip Bushill-Matthews
- Niels Busk
- Yves Butel

== C ==
- Martin Callanan
- Giorgio Calò
- Felipe Camisón Asensio
- António Campos
- Mogens Camre
- Carlos Candal
- Marco Cappato
- Raquel Cardoso
- Marie-Arlette Carlotti
- Carlos Carnero González
- Massimo Carraro
- Maria Carrilho
- Paulo Casaca
- Michael Cashman
- Gérard Caudron
- Isabelle Caullery
- Chantal Cauquil
- Charlotte Cederschiöld
- Giorgio Celli
- Alejandro Cercas
- Carmen Cerdeira Morterero
- Luigi Cesaro
- Ozan Ceyhun
- Giles Chichester
- Philip Claeys
- Nicholas Clegg
- Luigi Cocilovo
- Carlos Coelho
- Daniel Cohn-Bendit
- Gerry Collins
- Joan Colom i Naval
- Richard Corbett
- Dorette Corbey
- Thierry Cornillet
- John Corrie
- Armando Cossutta
- Paolo Costa
- Raffaele Costa
- Paul Coûteaux
- Pat Cox
- Brian Crowley
- John Cushnahan

== D ==
- Rijk van Dam
- Elisa Damião
- Danielle Darras
- Michel Dary
- Joseph Daul
- Chris Davies
- Willy De Clercq
- Francis Decourrière
- Jean-Maurice Dehousse
- Véronique De Keyser
- Gianfranco Dell'Alba
- Benedetto Della Vedova
- Marcello Dell'Utri
- Luigi De Mita
- Gérard Deprez
- Proinsias De Rossa
- Marielle De Sarnez
- Marie-Hélène Descamps
- Harlem Désir
- Nirj Deva
- Christine De Veyrac
- Jan Dhaene
- Rosa Díez González
- Giuseppe Di Lello Finuoli
- Koenraad Dillen
- Giorgos Dimitrakopoulos
- Antonio Di Pietro
- Bert Doorn
- Den Dover
- Avril Doyle
- Bárbara Dührkop Dührkop
- Andrew Duff
- Olivier Duhamel
- Garrelt Duin
- Olivier Dupuis
- Lone Dybkjær

== E ==
- Michl Ebner
- Raina Echerer
- Petros Efthymiou
- Säid El Khadraoui
- James Elles
- Marianne Eriksson
- Alain Esclopé
- Harald Ettl
- Jillian Evans
- Jonathan Evans
- Robert Evans

== F ==
- Göran Färm
- Nigel Farage
- Carlo Fatuzzo
- Gianni Fava
- Markus Ferber
- Fernando Fernández Martín
- Juan Ferrández Lezaun
- Anne Ferreira
- Concepció Ferrer
- Enrico Ferri
- Christel Fiebiger
- Ilda Figueiredo
- Francesco Fiori
- Jim Fitzsimons
- Hélène Flautre
- Marialiese Flemming
- Colette Flesch
- Karl-Heinz Florenz
- Christos Folias
- Glyn Ford
- Marco Formentini
- Jacqueline Foster
- Janelly Fourtou
- Pernille Frahm
- Geneviève Fraisse
- Monica Frassoni
- Ingo Friedrich
- Jean-Claude Fruteau

== G ==
- Michael Gahler
- Per Gahrton
- Gerardo Galeote Quecedo
- Marie-Françoise Garaud
- José García-Margallo y Marfil
- Cristina García-Orcoyen Tormo
- Giuseppe Gargani
- Georges Garot
- Salvador Garriga Polledo
- Carles-Alfred Gasòliba i Böhm
- Charles de Gaulle
- Jas Gawronski
- Evelyne Gebhardt
- Vitaliano Gemelli
- Fiorella Ghilardotti
- Neena Gill
- Marie-Hélène Gillig
- José Gil-Robles Gil-Delgado
- Norbert Glante
- Anne-Karin Glase
- Gian Gobbo
- Robert Goebbels
- Lutz Goepel
- Willi Görlach
- Bruno Gollnisch
- Alfred Gomolka
- Robert Goodwill
- Koldo Gorostiaga Atxalandabaso
- João Gouveia
- Friedrich-Wilhelm Graefe zu Baringdorf
- Vasco Graça Moura
- Pauline Green (resigned November 1999)
- Lissy Gröner
- Lisbeth Grönfeldt Bergman
- Mathieu Grosch
- Françoise Grossetête
- Cristina Gutiérrez-Cortines
- Catherine Guy-Quint

== H ==
- Klaus Hänsch
- Gerhard Hager
- Daniel Hannan
- Michel Hansenne
- Malcolm Harbour
- Konstantinos Hatzidakis
- Jutta Haug
- Adeline Hazan
- Christopher Heaton-Harris
- Ewa Hedkvist Petersen
- Roger Helmer
- Marie-Thérèse Hermange
- Jorge Hernández Mollar
- Esther Herranz García
- Philippe Herzog
- Ruth Hieronymi
- Magdalene Hoff
- Mary Honeyball (from 2000)
- Brice Hortefeux
- Richard Howitt
- Ian Hudghton
- Stephen Hughes
- Christopher Huhne
- Michiel van Hulten
- John Hume
- Liam Hyland

== I ==
- Ulpu Iivari
- Wolfgang Ilgenfritz
- Renzo Imbeni
- Lord Inglewood
- Marie Anne Isler Béguin
- Juan Izquierdo Collado
- María Izquierdo Rojo

== J ==
- Caroline Jackson
- Georg Jarzembowski
- Thierry Jean-Pierre
- Elisabeth Jeggle
- Anne Jensen
- Karin Jöns
- Pierre Jonckheer
- Salvador Jové Peres
- Karin Junker

== K ==
- Anna Karamanou
- Othmar Karas
- Hans Karlsson
- Martin Kastler
- Giorgos Katiforis
- Sylvia-Yvonne Kaufmann
- Piia-Noora Kauppi
- Hedwig Keppelhoff-Wiechert
- Margot Kessler
- Bashir Khanbhai
- Heinz Kindermann
- Glenys Kinnock
- Timothy Kirkhope
- Ewa Klamt
- Christa Klaß
- Karsten Knolle
- Dieter-Lebrecht Koch
- Christoph Konrad
- Efstratios Korakas
- Eija-Riitta Korhola
- Ioannis Koukiadis
- Dimitrios Koulourianos
- Ole Krarup
- Rodi Kratsa-Tsagaropoulou
- Constanze Krehl
- Wolfgang Kreissl-Dörfler
- Alain Krivine
- Hans Kronberger
- Wilfried Kuckelkorn
- Helmut Kuhne
- Florence Kuntz

== L ==
- Carlos Lage
- Joost Lagendijk
- Arlette Laguiller
- Catherine Lalumière
- Alain Lamassoure
- Jean Lambert
- Carl Lang
- Bernd Lange
- Werner Langen
- Brigitte Langenhagen
- Paul Lannoye
- Thierry de La Perriere
- Armin Laschet
- Vincenzo Lavarra
- Kurt Lechner
- Klaus-Heiner Lehne
- Jo Leinen
- Peter Liese
- Rolf Linkohr
- Alain Lipietz
- Giorgio Lisi
- Raffaele Lombardo
- Caroline Lucas
- Sarah Ludford
- Astrid Lulling
- Torben Lund
- Elizabeth Lynne

== M ==
- Albert Maat
- Jules Maaten
- Linda McAvan
- Arlene McCarthy
- Joe McCartin
- Neil MacCormick
- Patricia McKenna
- Edward McMillan-Scott
- Eryl McNally
- Nelly Maes
- Minerva Malliori
- Cecilia Malmström
- Toine Manders
- Lucio Manisco
- Erika Mann
- Thomas Mann
- Mario Mantovani
- Jean-Charles Marchiani
- Luís Marinho
- Franco Marini
- Ioannis Marinos
- Helmuth Markov
- Sérgio Marques
- Pedro Marset Campos
- Claudio Martelli
- Maria Martens
- David Martin
- Hans-Peter Martin
- Hugues Martin
- Jean-Claude Martinez
- Miguel Ángel Martínez Martínez
- Mario Mastella
- Emmanouil Mastorakis
- Véronique Mathieu
- Marjo Matikainen-Kallström
- Mario Mauro
- Hans-Peter Mayer
- Xaver Mayer
- Miquel Mayol i Raynal
- Manuel Medina Ortega
- Erik Meijer
- Íñigo Méndez de Vigo
- José Mendiluce Pereiro
- Emilio Menéndez
- Pietro-Paolo Mennea
- Domenico Mennitti
- Winfried Menrad
- Reinhold Messner
- Rosa Miguélez Ramos
- Bill Miller
- Joaquim Miranda
- Ana Miranda De Lage
- Hans Modrow
- Peter Mombaur
- Enrique Monsonís Domingo
- Elizabeth Montfort
- Claude Moraes
- Eluned Morgan
- Luisa Morgantini
- Philippe Morillon
- Rosemarie Müller
- Jan Mulder
- Simon Murphy
- Cristiana Muscardini
- Francesco Musotto
- Antonio Mussa
- Sebastiano Musumeci
- Riitta Myller

== N ==
- Sami Naïr
- Pasqualina Napoletano
- Giorgio Napolitano
- Juan Naranjo Escobar
- Hartmut Nassauer
- Bill Newton Dunn
- Jim Nicholson
- Baroness Nicholson of Winterbourne
- Angelika Niebler
- Giuseppe Nistico'
- Mauro Nobilia
- Camilo Nogueira Román
- Jean-Thomas Nordmann

== O ==
- Raimon Obiols
- Juan Ojeda Sanz
- Karl Olsson
- Seán Ó Neachtain
- Gérard Onesta
- Ria Oomen-Ruijten
- Arie Oostlander
- Marcelino Oreja Arburúa
- Josu Ortuondo Larrea
- Barbara O'Toole

== P ==
- Reino Paasilinna
- José Pacheco Pereira
- Elena Paciotti
- Doris Pack
- Ian Paisley
- Marco Pannella
- Mihalis Papagiannakis
- Neil Parish
- Charles Pasqua
- Paolo Pastorelli
- Ioannis Patakis
- Béatrice Patrie
- Marit Paulsen
- Manuel Pérez Álvarez
- Fernando Pérez Royo
- Roy Perry
- Mikko Pesälä
- Peter Pex
- Wilhelm Piecyk
- Yves Piétrasanta
- Hubert Pirker
- Joaquim Piscarreta
- Giuseppe Pisicchio
- Giovanni Pittella
- Elly Plooij-Van Gorsel
- Guido Podestà
- Hans-Gert Poettering
- Samuli Pohjamo
- Bernard Poignant
- Adriana Poli Bortone
- José Javier Pomés Ruiz
- Jacques Poos
- Bernd Posselt
- Christa Prets
- Giovanni Procacci
- Bartho Pronk
- James Provan
- Alonso Puerta
- John Purvis

== Q ==
- Luís Queiró
- Godelieve Quisthoudt-Rowohl

== R ==
- Reinhard Rack
- Alexander Radwan
- Christa Randzio-Plath
- Bernhard Rapkay
- Daniela Raschhofer
- Michel Raymond
- Imelda Read
- Encarnación Redondo Jiménez
- José Ribeiro e Castro
- Mónica Ridruejo
- Frédérique Ries
- Karin Riis-Jørgensen
- Carlos Ripoll Y Martínez De Bedoya
- Michel Rocard
- Didier Rod
- María Rodríguez Ramos
- Alexander de Roo
- Dagmar Roth-Behrendt
- Mechtild Rothe
- Willi Rothley
- Martine Roure
- Christian Rovsing
- Paul Rübig
- Heide Rühle
- Giorgio Ruffolo
- Francesco Rutelli

== S ==
- Guido Sacconi
- Lennart Sacrédeus
- Jean Saint-Josse
- Jannis Sakellariou
- José Salafranca Sánchez-Neyra
- Yvonne Sandberg-Fries
- Ulla Sandbæk
- Maria Sanders-ten Holte
- Jacques Santer
- Giacomo Santini
- Manuel dos Santos
- Amalia Sartori
- Francisca Sauquillo Pérez del Arco
- Gilles Savary
- Luciana Sbarbati
- Dana Scallon
- Umberto Scapagnini
- Michel-Ange Scarbonchi
- Anne-Marie Schaffner
- Karin Scheele
- Agnes Schierhuber
- Ursula Schleicher
- Gerhard Schmid
- Herman Schmid
- Olle Schmidt
- Ingo Schmitt
- Horst Schnellhardt
- Inger Schörling
- Ilka Schröder
- Jürgen Schröder
- Elisabeth Schroedter
- Martin Schulz
- Konrad Schwaiger
- Mariotto Segni
- Esko Seppänen
- Peter Sichrovsky
- Brian Simpson
- Jonas Sjöstedt
- Peter Skinner
- Miet Smet
- Mário Soares
- Patsy Sörensen
- Renate Sommer
- María Sornosa Martínez
- Dominique Souchet
- Ioannis Souladakis
- Sérgio Sousa Pinto
- Francesco Speroni
- Bart Staes
- Gabriele Stauner
- Per Stenmarck
- Ursula Stenzel
- Dirk Sterckx
- Struan Stevenson
- Catherine Stihler
- Marie-France Stirbois
- Ulrich Stockmann
- Earl of Stockton
- Robert Sturdy
- Margie Sudre
- David Sumberg
- Ilkka Suominen
- Joke Swiebel
- Johannes Swoboda
- Fodé Sylla
- Ole Sørensen

== T ==
- Antonio Tajani
- Charles Tannock
- Anna Terrón i Cusí
- Diemut Theato
- Maj Theorin
- Nicole Thomas-Mauro
- Helle Thorning-Schmidt
- Astrid Thors
- Marianne Thyssen
- Jeffrey Titford
- Gary Titley
- Helena Torres Marques
- Antonios Trakatellis
- Bruno Trentin
- Dimitris Tsatsos
- Franz Turchi
- Maurizio Turco
- Claude Turmes
- Ian Twinn

== U ==
- Feleknas Uca

== V ==
- Roseline Vachetta
- Paavo Väyrynen
- Joaquim Vairinhos
- Jaime Valdivielso De Cué
- María Valenciano Martínez-Orozco
- Joan Vallvé
- Johan Van Hecke
- Anne Van Lancker
- Geoffrey Van Orden
- Alexandre Varaut
- Daniel Varela Suanzes-Carpegna
- Ari Vatanen
- Gianni Vattimo
- Walter Veltroni
- W.G. van Velzen
- Herman Vermeer
- Françoise de Veyrinas
- Alejo Vidal-Quadras Roca
- Theresa Villiers
- Luigi Vinci
- Kyösti Virrankoski
- Dominique Vlasto
- Johannes Voggenhuber
- Demetrio Volcic

== W ==
- Peder Wachtmeister
- Diana Wallis
- Ralf Walter
- Graham Watson
- Mark Watts
- Barbara Weiler
- Brigitte Wenzel-Perillo
- Phillip Whitehead
- Rainer Wieland
- Jan Wiersma
- Anders Wijkman
- Karl von Wogau
- Joachim Wuermeling
- Matti Wuori
- Francis Wurtz
- Eurig Wyn
- Terence Wynn

== X ==
- Stavros Xarchakos

== Z ==
- Theresa Zabell
- Christos Zacharakis
- Stefano Zappala'
- François Zimeray
- Jürgen Zimmerling
- Sabine Zissener
- Myrsini Zorba
- Olga Zrihen

== See also ==
- Members of the European Parliament (1999–2004)
- 1999 European Parliament election
