= List of members of the European Parliament for Austria, 1999–2004 =

This is the list of the 21 members of the European Parliament for Austria in the 1999 to 2004 session.

== List ==
Name	National party	EP Group
Maria Berger	Social Democratic Party	PES
Herbert Bösch	Social Democratic Party	PES
Mercedes Echerer	The Greens–The Green Alternative	G–EFA
Harald Ettl	Social Democratic Party	PES
Marialiese Flemming	People's Party	EPP–ED
Gerhard Hager	Freedom Party	NI
Wolfgang Ilgenfritz	Freedom Party	NI
Othmar Karas	People's Party	EPP–ED
Hans Kronberger	Freedom Party	NI
Hans-Peter Martin	Social Democratic Party	PES
Hubert Pirker	People's Party	EPP–ED
Christa Prets	Social Democratic Party	PES
Reinhard Rack	People's Party	EPP–ED
Daniela Raschhofer	Freedom Party	NI
Paul Rübig	People's Party	EPP–ED
Karin Scheele	Social Democratic Party	PES
Agnes Schierhuber	People's Party	EPP–ED
Peter Sichrovsky	Freedom Party	NI
Ursula Stenzel	People's Party	EPP–ED
Hannes Swoboda	Social Democratic Party	PES
Johannes Voggenhuber	The Greens–The Green Alternative	G–EFA
