= List of members of the European Parliament for Austria, 1996–1999 =

This is a list of the 21 members of the European Parliament for Austria in the 1996 to 1999 session, ordered by name. See 1996 European Parliament election in Austria for election results.

== List ==
Name	National party	EP Group
Reinhard Rack	People's Party	EPP
Paul Rübig	People's Party	EPP
Agnes Schierhuber	People's Party	EPP
Michael Spindelegger	People's Party	EPP
Karl Habsburg-Lothringen	People's Party	EPP
Hubert Pirker	People's Party	EPP
Reinhard Rack	People's Party	EPP
Herbert Bösch	Social Democratic Party	PES
Maria Berger	Social Democratic Party	PES
Harald Ettl	Social Democratic Party	PES
Ilona Graenitz	Social Democratic Party	PES
Hilde Hawlicek	Social Democratic Party	PES
Hannes Swoboda	Social Democratic Party	PES
Gerhard Hager	Freedom Party	NI
Hans Kronberger	Freedom Party	NI
Franz Linser	Freedom Party	NI
Klaus Lukas	Freedom Party	NI
Daniela Raschhofer	Freedom Party	NI
Peter Sichrovsky	Freedom Party	NI
Johannes Voggenhuber	The Greens–The Green Alternative	G
Friedhelm Frischenschlager	Liberal Forum	ELDR
