= List of members of the European Parliament for Austria, 2004–2009 =

This is the list of the 18 members of the European Parliament for Austria in the 2004 to 2009 session.

== List ==
Name	National Party	EP Group
Maria Berger	Social Democratic Party	PES
Herbert Bösch	Social Democratic Party	PES
Harald Ettl	Social Democratic Party	PES
Othmar Karas	People's Party	EPP–ED
Jörg Leichtfried	Social Democratic Party	PES
Eva Lichtenberger	The Greens–The Green Alternative	G–EFA
Hans-Peter Martin	Hans-Peter Martin's List	NI
Andreas Mölzer	Freedom Party	NI
Christa Prets	Social Democratic Party	PES
Reinhard Rack	People's Party	EPP–ED
Karin Resetarits	Hans-Peter Martin's List	NI (2004–2005); ALDE
Paul Rübig	People's Party	EPP–ED
Karin Scheele	Social Democratic Party	PES
Agnes Schierhuber	People's Party	EPP–ED
Richard Seeber	People's Party	EPP–ED
Ursula Stenzel	People's Party	EPP–ED
Hannes Swoboda	Social Democratic Party	PES
Johannes Voggenhuber	The Greens–The Green Alternative	G–EFA

== Sources ==
- Ministry of the Interior (in German)
