= List of members of the European Parliament for Portugal, 1999–2004 =

This is a list of the 25 members of the European Parliament for Portugal in the 1999 to 2004 session.

== List ==
Name	National party	EP Group
Mário Soares	Socialist Party	PES
António José Seguro (1999–2001)	Socialist Party	PES
Fernando Luís Marinho	Socialist Party	PES
Helena Torres Marques	Socialist Party	PES
Carlos Cardoso Lage	Socialist Party	PES
António Campos	Socialist Party	PES
Sérgio Sousa Pinto	Socialist Party	PES
Maria Carrilho	Socialist Party	PES
Paulo Casaca	Socialist Party	PES
Carlos Candal	Socialist Party	PES
Elisa Maria Damião	Socialist Party	PES
Joaquim Vairinhos	Socialist Party	PES
Manuel António dos Santos (2001–2004)	Socialist Party	PES
José Pacheco Pereira	Social Democratic Party	EPP–ED
Vasco Graça Moura	Social Democratic Party	EPP–ED
Teresa Almeida Garrett	Social Democratic Party	EPP–ED
Arlindo Cunha (1999–2003)	Social Democratic Party	EPP–ED
Carlos Costa Neves (1999–2002)	Social Democratic Party	EPP–ED
Sérgio Marques	Social Democratic Party	EPP–ED
Jorge Moreira da Silva (1999–2003)	Social Democratic Party	EPP–ED
Carlos Coelho	Social Democratic Party	EPP–ED
Fernando Reis (1999–2000)	Social Democratic Party	EPP–ED
Regina Bastos (2000–2004)	Social Democratic Party	EPP–ED
Joaquim Piscarreta (2002–2004)	Social Democratic Party	EPP–ED
João Gouveia (2003–2004)	Social Democratic Party	EPP–ED
Raquel Cardoso (2003–2004)	Social Democratic Party	EPP–ED
Ilda Figueiredo	Portuguese Communist Party	EUL–NGL
Joaquim Miranda (1999–2004)	Portuguese Communist Party	EUL–NGL
Sérgio Ribeiro (2004)	Portuguese Communist Party	EUL–NGL
Paulo Portas (1999)	CDS – People's Party	UEN
Luís Queiró	CDS – People's Party	UEN
José Ribeiro e Castro (1999–2004)	CDS – People's Party	UEN
