= Encarnación Redondo =

Spanish politician

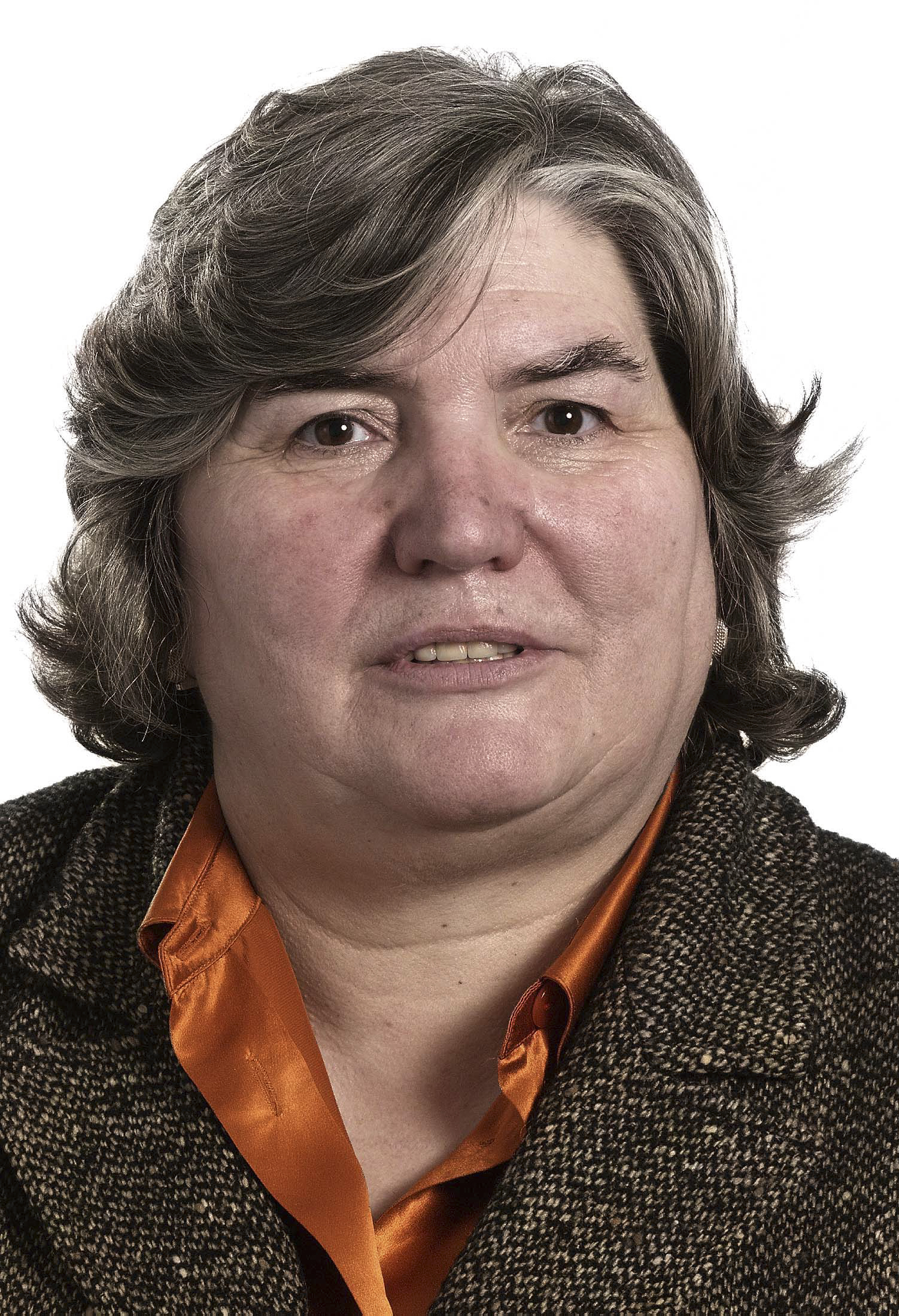
- Redondo Jiménez in 1999

Mayor of Soria
- In office 2003–2007

Member of European Parliament
- In office 1994–2004
- Parliamentary group: European People's Party Group

Personal details
- Born: 18 April 1944 (age 82) Molinos de Razón, Soria, Spain
- Party: People's Party

Encarnación Redondo Jiménez (born 18 April 1944) is a former member of the European Parliament for the fourth (1994–1999) and fifth (1999–2004) parliamentary terms.

== Early life and education ==
She was born in 1944 in Molinos de Razón in the Spanish province of Soria. She trained in agricultural engineering.

== Career ==
Redondo Jiménez served two terms in the European Parliament, the fourth (1994–1999) and the fifth (1999–2004). She was a member of the European People's Party Group and the Spanish national People's Party.

During her first term between 1994 and 1999, she served as a member of committees on Agriculture and Rural Development; inquiry into BSE (bovine spongiform encephalopathy); and Budgetary Control. She was a substitute on committees for Women's Rights; and Environment, Public Health and Consumer Protection. She was a member of delegations for relations with Israel, Central America and Mexico.

During her second term between 1999 and 2004, she became vice-chair of the committee on Agriculture and Rural Development and was chair of the Temporary committee on foot and mouth disease. She was still a member of the committee on Agriculture and Rural Development and a substitute for Environment, Public Health and Consumer Policy; Budgets. She was a member of delegations for relations with countries of South America and MERCOSUR.

Many of her dossiers and contributions to debates concern sustainable practices in agriculture and forestry.

From 2003 to 2007, she served as Mayor of Soria and was affiliated with the People's Party and the Initiative for the Development of Soria.

== Awards ==
- 1994 Prize for Sorians of the year.

== See also ==
- 1994 European Parliament election in Spain
- List of members of the European Parliament, 1994–1999
- 1999 European Parliament election in Spain
- List of members of the European Parliament for Spain, 1999–2004
- List of members of the European Parliament, 1999–2004
