= Ioannis Patakis =

Greek politician (1940–2009)

- Γιάννης Πατάκης
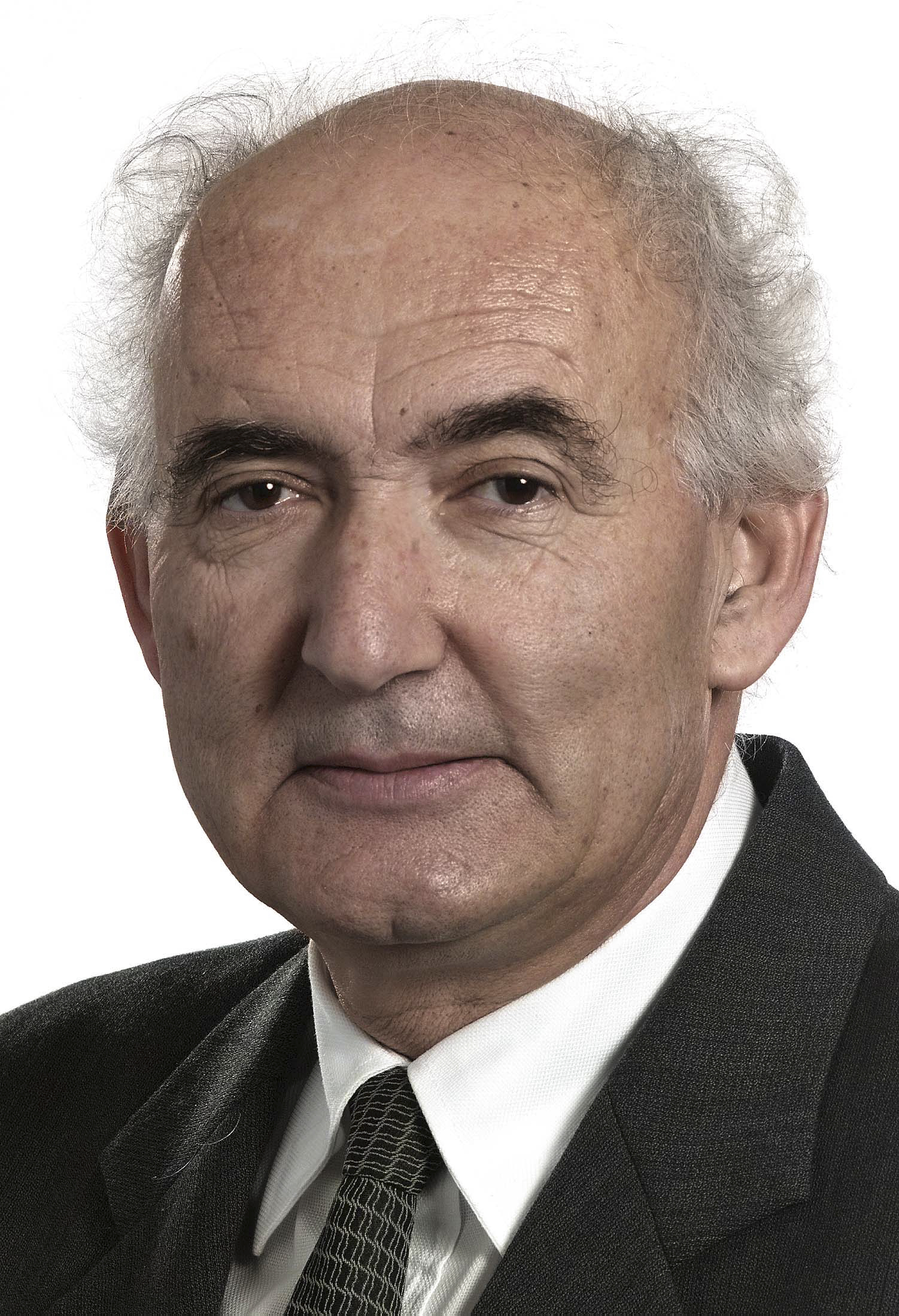
- Official portrait, 2001

Member of the European Parliament for Greece

Personal details
- Born: 22 November 1940 Nikaia Laridas, Greece
- Died: 10 April 2009 (aged 68)
- Party: Communist Party of Greece

Ioannis Patakis (Greek: Γιάννης Πατάκης; 22 November 1940 – 10 April 2009) was a Greek politician who was a Member of the European Parliament (MEP) from 2001 to 2004 for the Communist Party of Greece (KKE).
