= Giorgos Dimitrakopoulos =

Greek politician (born 1952)

- Γιώργος Δημητρακόπουλος
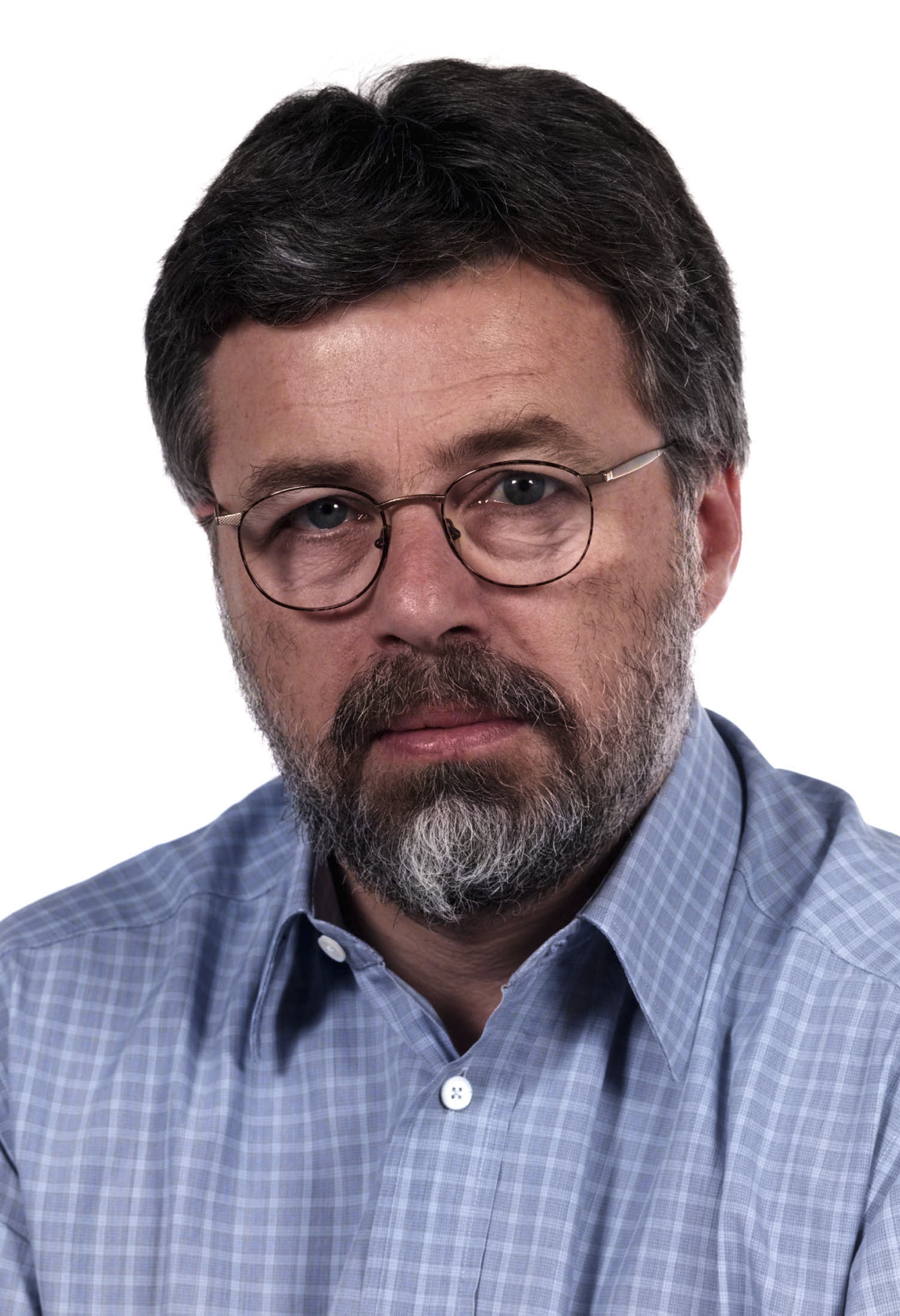
- Dimitrakopoulos in 1999

Member of the European Parliament for Greece
- In office 1994–2009

Personal details
- Born: 18 September 1952 (age 73) Athens, Greece
- Party: New Democracy
- Other political affiliations: EPP
- Education: University of Athens; American University; Fletcher School of Law and Diplomacy

Giorgos Dimitrakopoulos (Greek: Γιώργος Δημητρακόπουλος; born 18 September 1952) is a Greek politician who was a Member of the European Parliament for New Democracy; part of the European People's Party.

== Background ==
Graduate of the Legal Faculty of the University of Athens (Public Law and Political Science Department) (1972–1976): postgraduate studies (Master of Arts) in International Affairs at the American University (Washington, 1977–1979); postgraduate studies in international law and diplomatic history at the Fletcher School of Law and Diplomacy (Boston, 1979–1981).

== Political career ==
Political affairs adviser in the Prime Minister's Diplomatic Office (1983–1986). Political affairs adviser in the Foreign Ministers' Diplomatic Office (1986–1989). Member of the European Parliament (from 1994). First Vice-Chairman of the Committees on Petitions and Citizens rights (1994–1999). Chairman of the Delegation for relations with Switzerland, Iceland and Norway (1999–2000). Second Vice-President of the European Parliament (2002–2004). Chairman of the Conciliation Committee (2000–2004). Responsible for Euro-Mediterranean cooperation.

== Other appointments ==
Press and communications attaché at the Greek Embassy in Washington, USA (1977–1979). Diplomatic history researcher at the Fletcher School of Law and Diplomacy, Boston, USA (1979–1981). Visiting professor at the Greek Ministry of Foreign Affairs Institute of Diplomacy (Athens, 1983–1988).
