= Konstantinos Alyssandrakis =

Greek politician and astronomist

- Κωνσταντίνος Αλυσανδράκης
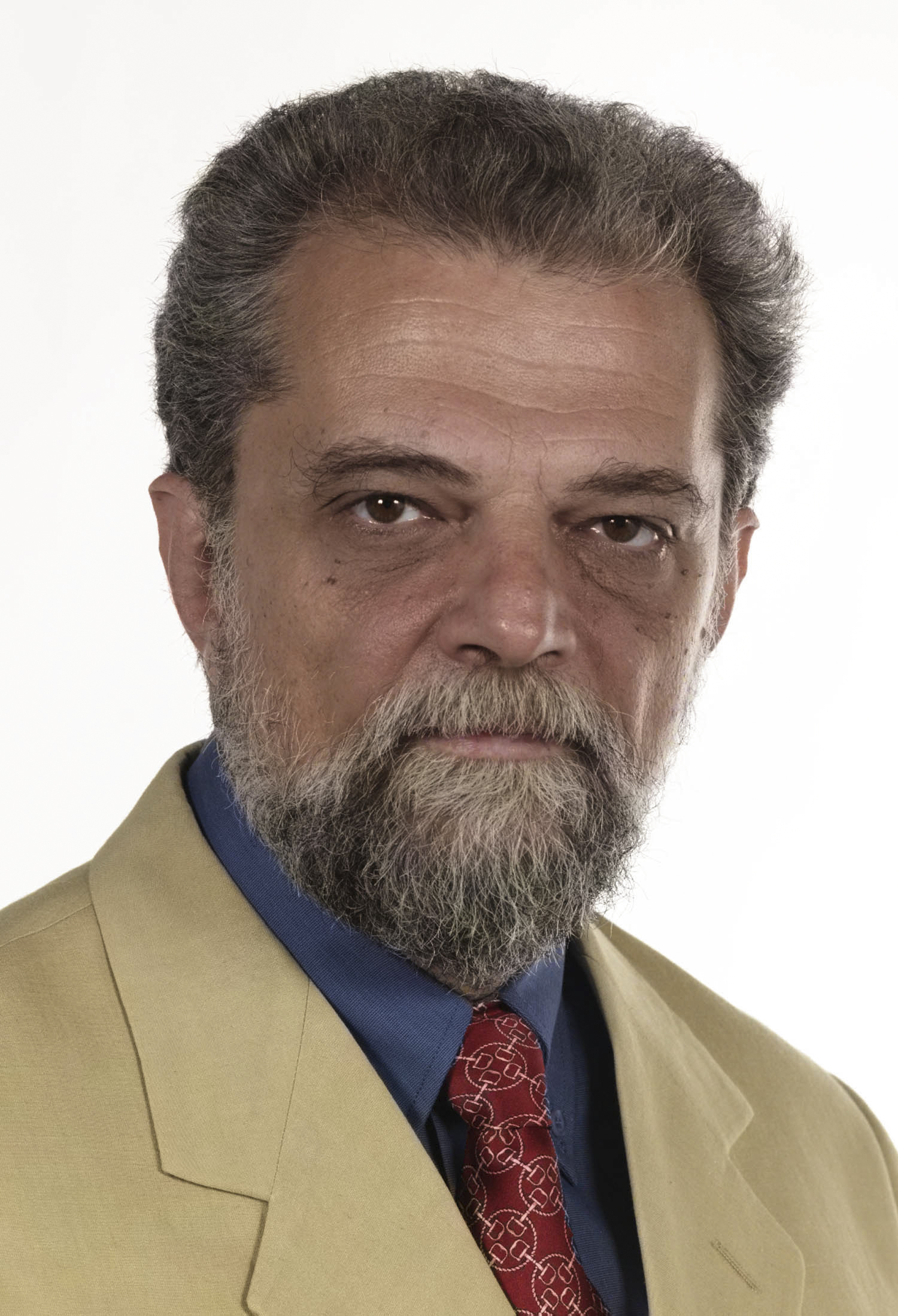
- Alyssandrakis in 1999

Member of the European Parliament
- In office 20 July 1999 – 19 July 2004
- Constituency: Greece

Personal details
- Born: 27 August 1948 (age 77) Athens, Kingdom of Greece
- Party: Communist Party of Greece

Konstantinos Alyssandrakis is a scientist in the field of astronomy, Professor at University of Ioanina, in Greece. His topics are astronomy, solar physics, radio-astronomy. He is now emeritus.

He was also a Greek politician, who from 1999 until 2004, was a Member of the European Parliament, representing Greece for the Communist Party.
