= María Luisa Bergaz Conesa =

Spanish politician

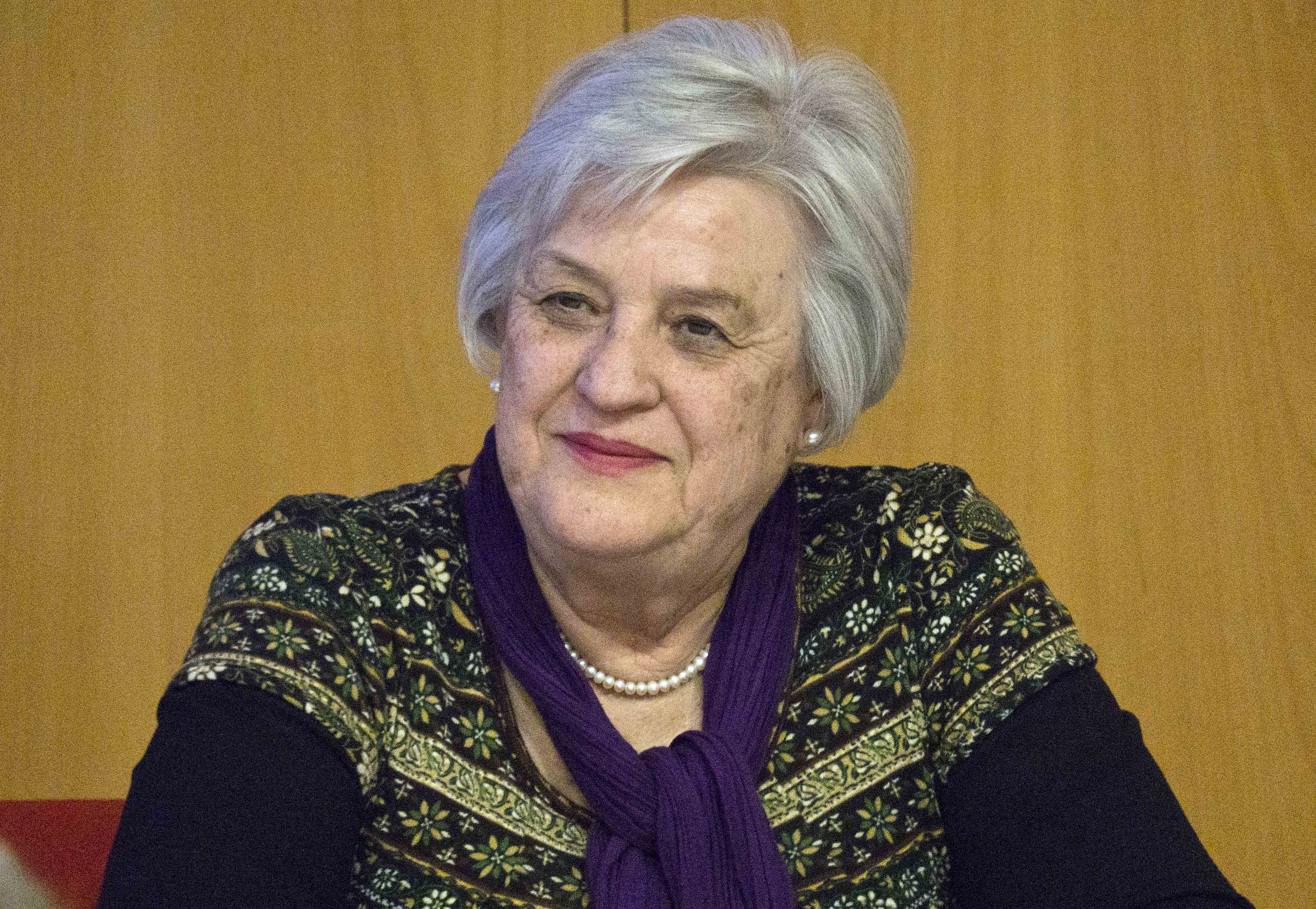
- Conesa in 2018

Member of the European Parliament
- In office 24 July 2003 – 19 July 2004
- Constituency: Spain

Personal details
- Born: 17 September 1947 (age 78) Xeraco, Valencian Community, Spain
- Party: United Left
- Occupation: Politician

María Luisa Bergaz Conesa (born 17 September 1947; Xeraco, Valencian Community) is a Spanish politician. From 2003 to 2004 she served as a Member of the European Parliament, representing Spain for the United Left. From November 2003-April 2004 she served as vice-chair of the Temporary committee on improving safety at sea.

Prior to her appointment, she served as a Member of both the Committee on Petitions and the Committee on the Environment, Public Health and Food Safety, and was a substitute for the European Parliament Committee on Employment and Social Affairs and the EP's Committee on Women's Rights and Gender Equality.
