= Christian Rovsing =

Danish politician (1936–2025)

Member of the European Parliament for Denmark
- In office 29 November 2007 – 13 July 2009
- Preceded by: Gitte Seeberg
- In office 25 July 1989 – 19 July 2004

Personal details
- Born: Christian Foldberg Rovsing; 2 November 1936 Rødovre, Denmark
- Died: 22 December 2025 (aged 89)
- Party: K
- Education: Technical University of Denmark (MSE)
- Occupation: Businessman

Christian Foldberg Rovsing (2 November 1936 – 22 December 2025) was a Danish politician. A member of the Conservative People's Party, he served as a member of the European Parliament from 1989 to 2004 and again from 2007 to 2009.

Rovsing died on 22 December 2025 at the age of 89.
