= Myrsini Zorba =

Myrsini Zorba (Greek: Μυρσίνη Ζορμπά; 1949–2023) was a Greek publisher and politician.

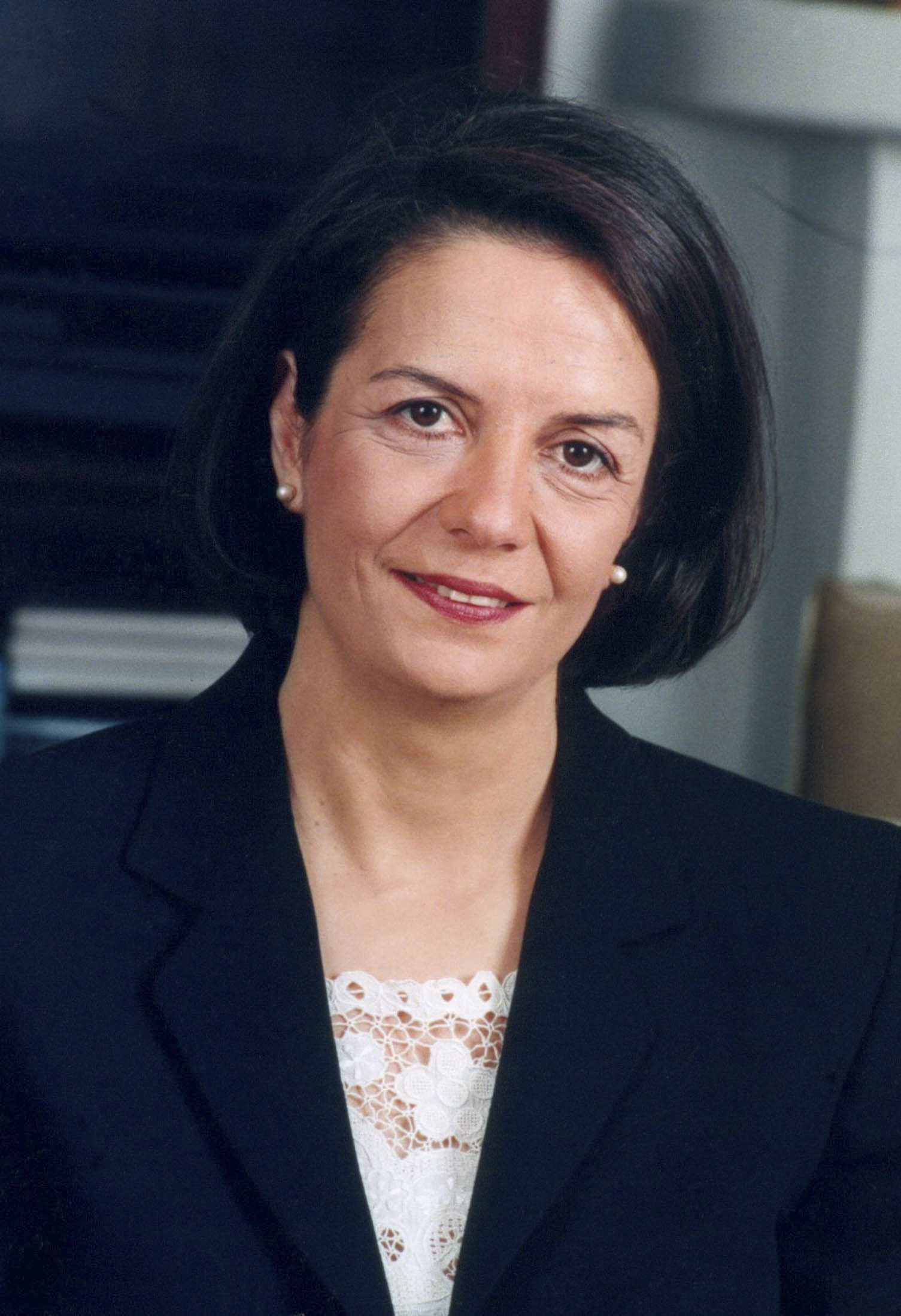
Zorba in 1999

== Life ==
Myrsini Zorba was born in Athens on 7 February 1949. She studied law at the University of Athens from 1968 to 1972, before postgraduate study in the philosophy of law at Sapienza University of Rome in 1973–74. Zorba opposed the Greek junta as an activist in the Patriotic Anti-dictatorship Front (PAM) and the Greek-European Youth Movement (EKIN), and contributed to the first issue of Anti magazine.

After the end of the dictatorship, Zorba was a member of KKE (Interior), the Greek Left (EAR), and the Politeia movement. In 1973 she co-founded the Odysseas publishing house, and worked at Odysseas until 1992. She also worked as a translator in the 1970s, translating the work of Antonio Gramsci into Greek. From 1992 to 1995 she taught theory and politics of culture at Athens University. From 1995 to 1999 she was the first director of the National Book Center of Greece (EKEVI).

From 1999 to 2004 Zorba was an MEP, with PASOK Socialists. In 2004, she founded the non-governmental organization Network for Children’s Rights. She taught at the Hellenic Open University from 2006 to 2012. In 2015 she founded the first school for refugee children. From August 2018 to July 2019 she served as Minister of Culture in the SYRIZA-ANEL coalition government.

She died on 20 April 2023 in Athens.
