= Piia-Noora Kauppi =

Finnish business executive and politician

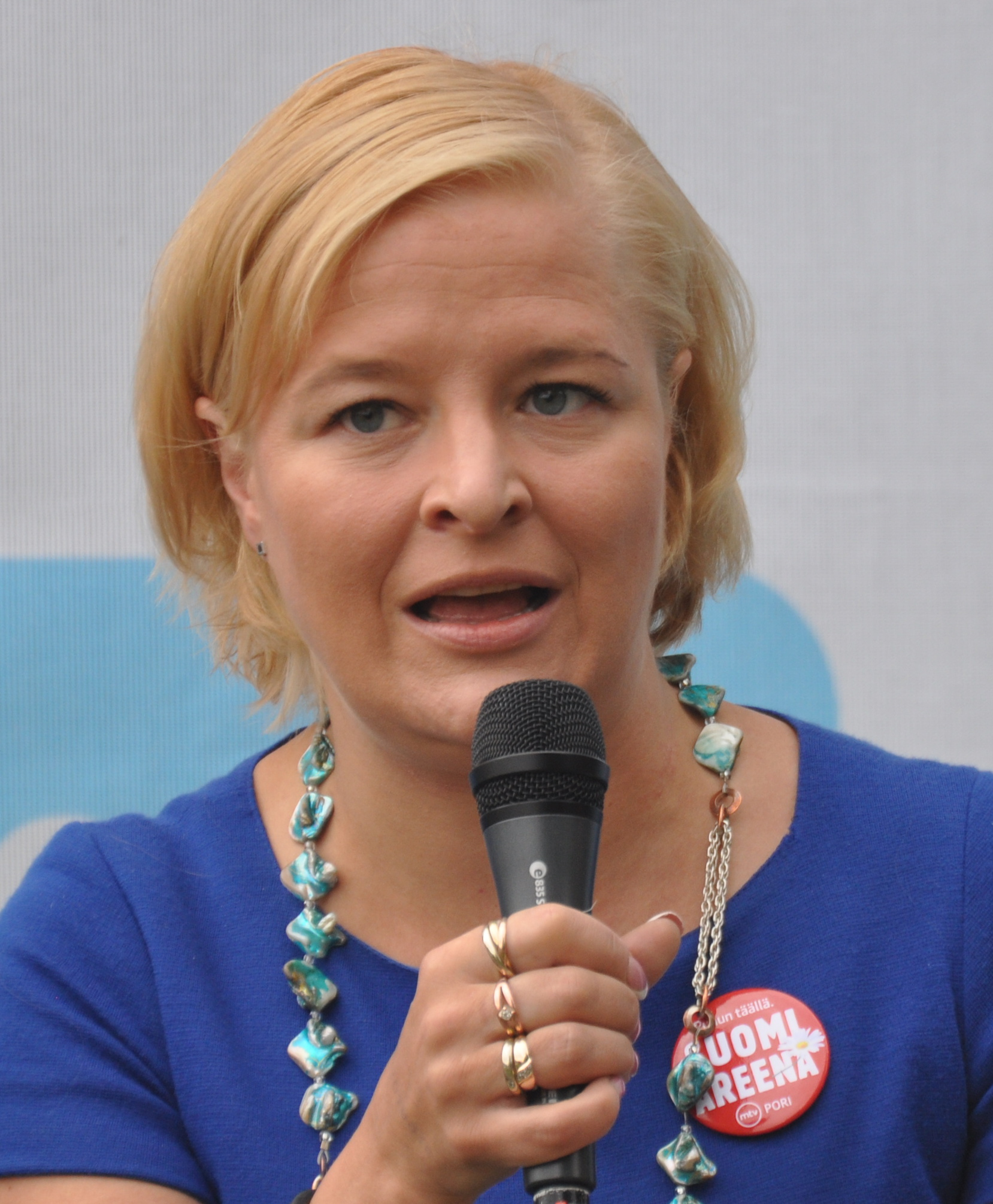
Piia-Noora Kauppi

Piia-Noora Kauppi (born 7 January 1975 in Oulu) is a Finnish former politician who currently serves as the managing director of the Federation of Finnish Financial Services. She served as a Member of the European Parliament (MEP) of the European People's Party from 1999 to 2008.

== Early life and education ==
Kauppi has a Master of Laws degree. She also studied economics at the Helsinki School of Economics and took some post-graduate studies at Harvard University and Yale University in the United States.

== Political career ==
=== Early beginnings ===
In gymnasium, Kauppi joined the National Coalition Party because it supported Finland joining the European Communities. She was actively involved in the Coalition Party Youth League and was its Oulu region president in 1993–1994, and the League's vice president in 1996–1997.

After graduating as LL.M., Kauppi acted as deputy group secretary and legislative secretary for the National Coalition Party parliamentary group in 1997–1999. At the same time she was involved in local politics in Oulu as member of the city council and city board in 1996–1999. She was also the vice president of the North Ostrobothnia chapter of the National Coalition Party in 1998–2006.

=== Member of the European Parliament, 1999–2008 ===
Kauppi was elected in the European Parliament twice: first in 1999, and again in 2004 with 62,995 votes. She was and still is the youngest Finnish person to have been elected as MEP.

In the Parliament in 2004–2006 Kauppi was a member in the Committee on Economic and Monetary Affairs, the Committee on Legal Affairs, and the Committee on Women's Rights and Gender Equality. She was focused especially on legislatory projects that concerned the financial market.

In addition to her committee assignments, Kauppi was a member in the Parliament's Delegation with the United States, and during her second period was also a member of the Inter-Parliamentary Delegation with China. She was also the president of the European Parliamentary Financial Services Forum, vice-president of the SME Union, and a member of the European Internet Foundation (EIF). In 2000 she was involved with founding the Campaign for Parliamentary Reform, together with Cecilia Malmström, Helle Thorning-Schmidt and Nick Clegg; the group was later joined in 2004 by Alexander Stubb. The group campaigned e.g. for a single seat for the Parliament, transparency in the compensation of travel expenses, the option of electronic signing of legislatory proposals, and a reform of the Parliament's interpretation policy.

During her political career, Kauppi focused especially on the constitutional development of the EU. She was e.g. the Parliament's representative in the European Convention to draft new treaties. She supported further opening the single market, transatlantic co-operation, seizing the possibilities of the European information society, and single supervision of European banking.

== Federation of Finnish Financial Services, 2009–present ==
Kauppi left the European Parliament on 1 January 2009 to become managing director of the Federation of Finnish Financial Services, a lobbying group. For this move she received an award for "Worst conflict of interest" at the "Worst EU lobbying Awards". According to the organisers she had for a long time been advocating interests of the European banking industry as an MEP by working against regulations for the sector. For example, in 2005 she was reported by The Wall Street Journal to have supported the banking lobby with watering down regulations against money-laundering. The organisers of the awards question her qualification to continuously participate in regulation efforts for a sector she would later be lobbying for.

== Other activities ==
- European Council on Foreign Relations (ECFR), Member of the council (since 2023)
- Trilateral Commission, Member of the European Group
