= Anne Elisabet Jensen =

Danish politician (born 1951)

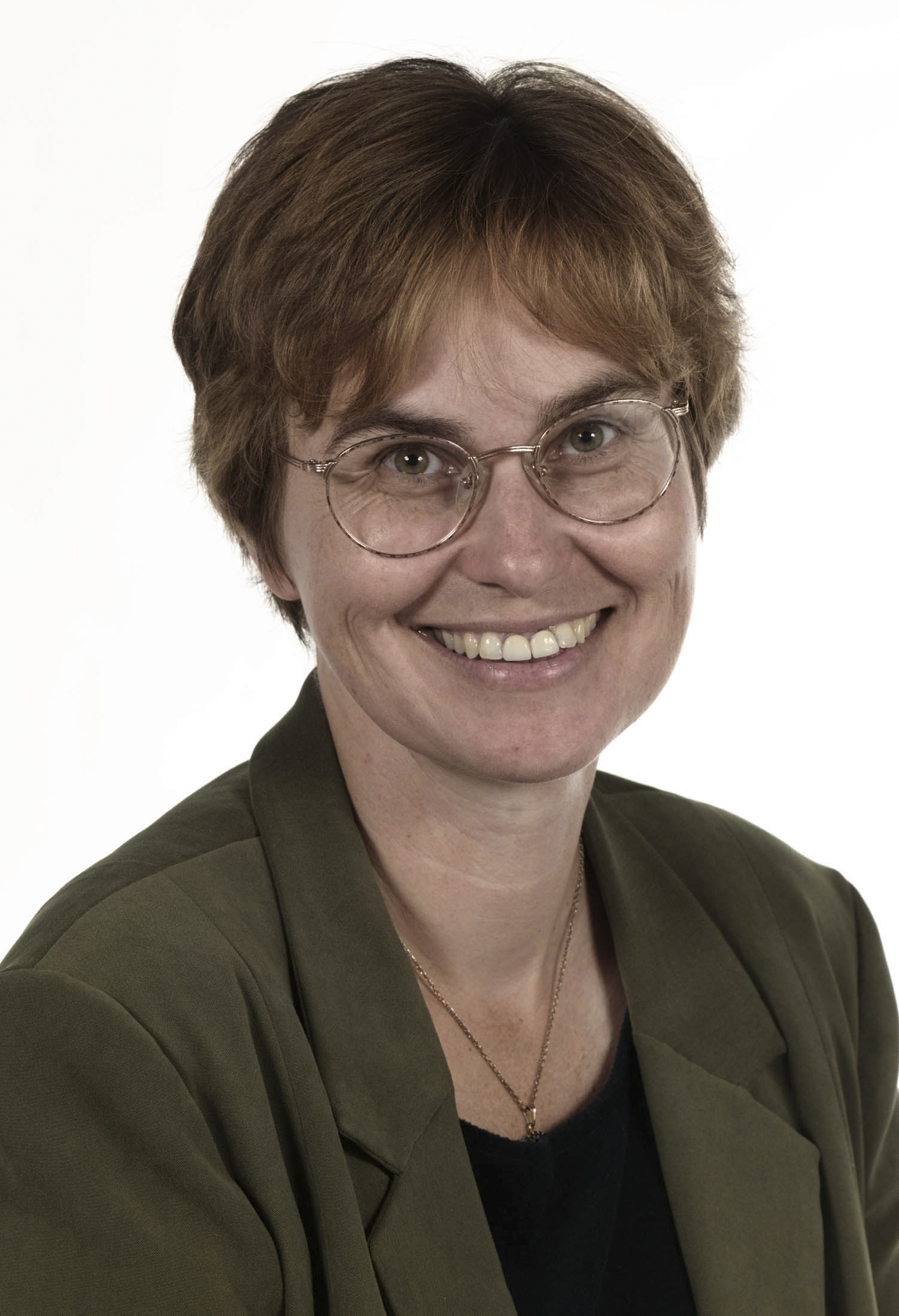
Jensen in 1999

Anne Elisabet Jensen (born 17 August 1951, in Kalundborg) is a Danish politician who served as a Member of the European Parliament from 1999 until 2014. She is a member of the Venstre, part of the Alliance of Liberals and Democrats for Europe.

In parliament, Jensen served on the European Parliament's Committee on Budgets. She was also a substitute for the Committee on Employment and Social Affairs and the Committee on Transport and Tourism.

== Education ==
- 1978: Master's degree in political and economic science from University of Copenhagen
- Economist (1978–1984) at Privatbanken
- Chief economist (1985–1994) at Privatbanken/Unibank
- Journalist (1984–1985) and senior editor (1996–1998), Berlingske Tidende

== Career ==
- 1994-1996: Director of the Danish Employers' Confederation
- 1999-2014: Member of the European Parliament
- 2002-2004: Vice-chairwoman of the Committee on Budgets

== See also ==
- 2004 European Parliament election in Denmark
