= Chantal Cauquil =

French politician (born 1949)

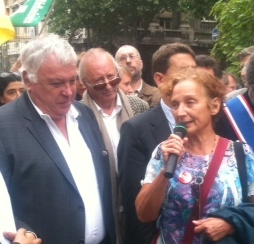
- Gérard Filoche and Cauquil in 2011

Member of the European Parliament
- In office 20 July 1999 – 19 July 2004
- Constituency: France

Personal details
- Born: 3 July 1949 (age 76) Montauban, Tarn-et-Garonne, France
- Party: Revolutionary Communist League, Workers' Struggle
- Occupation: Politician

Chantal Cauquil is a French politician, who, from 1999 until 2004, was a Member of the European Parliament (MEP) representing France. She was elected as a joint candidate for the Revolutionary Communist League and Workers' Struggle.
