= Mihalis Papagiannakis =

Greek politician (1941–2009)

- Μιχάλης Παπαγιαννάκης
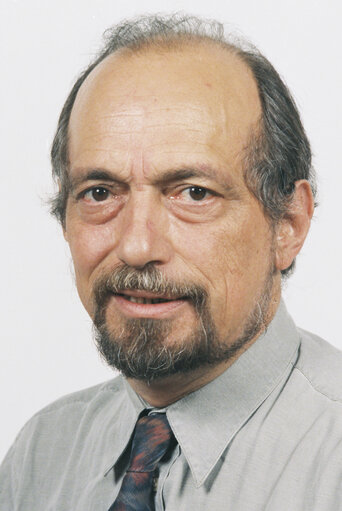

Member of the European Parliament for Greece
- In office 1989–2004

Member of the Hellenic Parliament for Athens B
- In office 2007–2009

Personal details
- Born: 19 August 1941 Kalamata, Peloponnese, Greece
- Died: 26 May 2009 (aged 67)
- Cause of death: Cancer
- Party: Coalition of the Radical Left
- Other political affiliations: Synaspismos

Mihalis Papayiannakis (Greek: Μιχάλης Παπαγιαννάκης; 19 August 1941 – 26 May 2009) was a Greek politician. He was born in Kalamata; his father was executed by the Nazis during World War II. He died on 26 May 2009 after a long battle with cancer.

== Life ==
He studied law, economics and political science at the universities of Athens, Montpellier and Paris.

=== Professional career ===
He taught at Panthéon-Assas University, the Institute of Business Management at Orsay and the Mediterranean Agronomical Institute at Montpellier (IAMM). From 1967 to 1987, his research areas included the Mediterranean economy, the European Community, the Chinese agricultural industry, and fishing. He was a contributor to several newspapers and magazines.

=== Political career ===
At first a member of United Democratic Left until 1963. From 1967 to 1973, he was a member of the anti-junta Democratic Defence. In 1987, he was a founding member of the Greek Left, which later became Synaspismos.

He was elected MEP for Synaspismos in the 1989, 1994 and 1999 European Parliament elections. He lost a bid for the party leadership to Alekos Alavanos in December 2004.

In the 2007 Greek general election, he was elected with the Coalition of the Radical Left MP for the Athens B constituency.
