= Joaquim Vairinhos =

Portuguese politician and writer (1944–2022)

Joaquim Manuel dos Santos Vairinhos
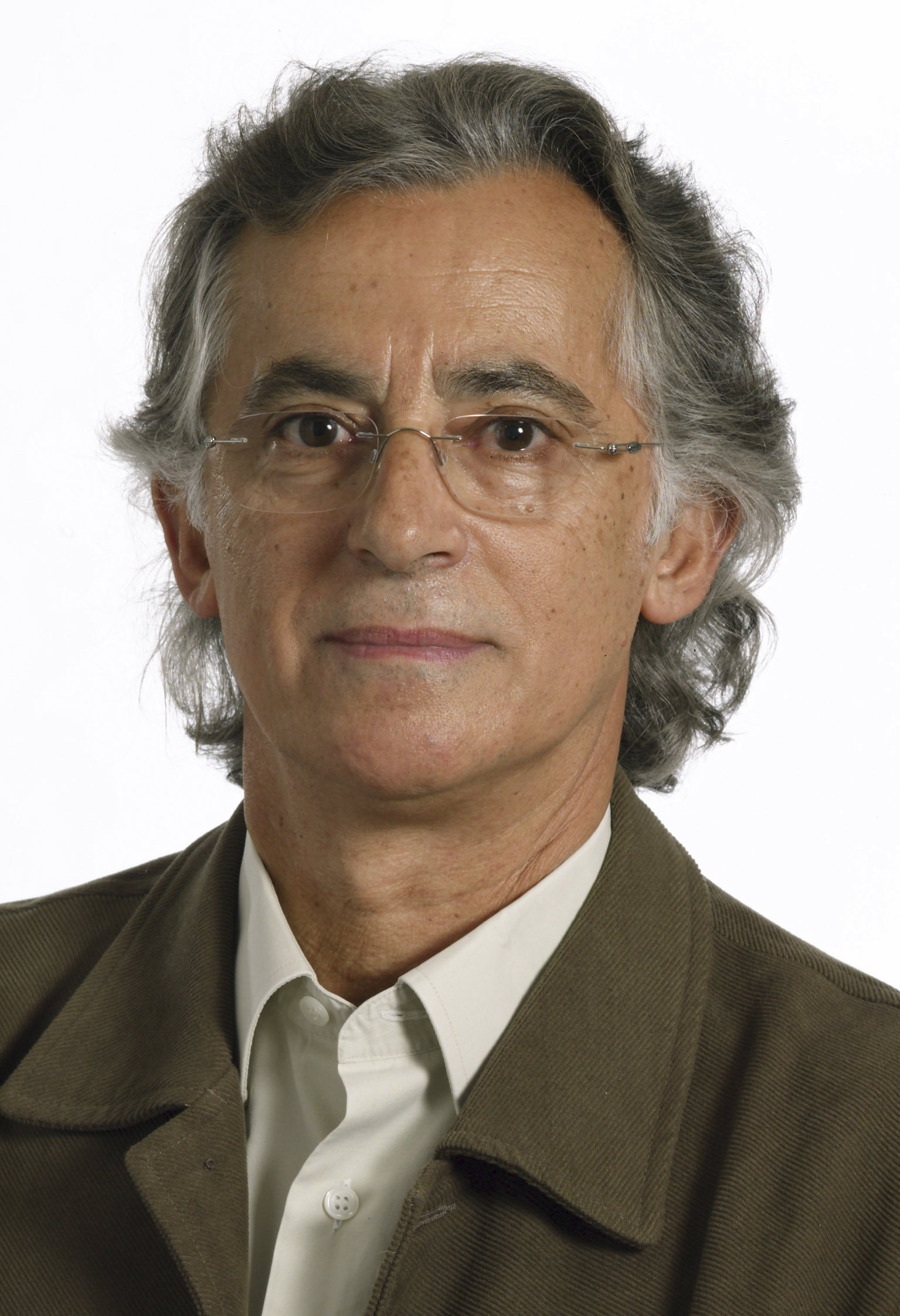
- Vairinhos in 1999
- Born: 25 June 1994; Loulé, Portugal
- Died: 11 April 2022 (aged 27); Faro, Portugal
- Occupations: Politician; teacher; writer

Joaquim Manuel dos Santos Vairinhos (25 June 1944, Loulé – 11 April 2022, Faro) was a Portuguese politician, teacher, and writer. He served as mayor of Loulé from 1990 to 1999 and was a member of the European Parliament.

== Biography ==
Joaquim Vairinhos was born on 25 June 1944 in Loulé. He graduated in education and completed a postgraduate degree in environmental management.

He served as Mayor of Loulé from 1990 to 1999, when he resigned to become a Member of the European Parliament for the Socialist Party, holding that position until 2004. During his tenure in Loulé, he served on the Committee of the Regions of the European Union from 1994 to 1999. He also chaired the Algarve division of the Socialist Party.

Joaquim Vairinhos worked as a consultant, teacher, guidance inspector, and pedagogical coordinator for the Ministry of Education. He was also known for his involvement in associations in Loulé and the region, being primarily responsible for the founding of the Casa da Cultura, the Tennis Club, and the Rugby Club. He was also an athlete for the Louletano, Benfica, and Faro e Benfica clubs in the sports of football, athletics, and rugby. In his later years, he began a career as a writer, producing several poetry books, including Coisas do Coração, Afrodites, ...para que não digas que não falo de amor..., e se o mar fosse eu?, Grito só silêncios nas asas do Verbo, and Retalhos Poéticos do Quotidiano.

He died on 11 April 2022, in Faro, aged 77. In February of that year, he had been honored by the Loulé City Council, which named the Municipal Pavilion after him. Following his death, the Loulé municipality declared three days of municipal mourning. The Algarve Intermunicipal Community also issued a note of condolence, describing him as a "man defender of causes."
