= Luís Queiró =

Portuguese politician

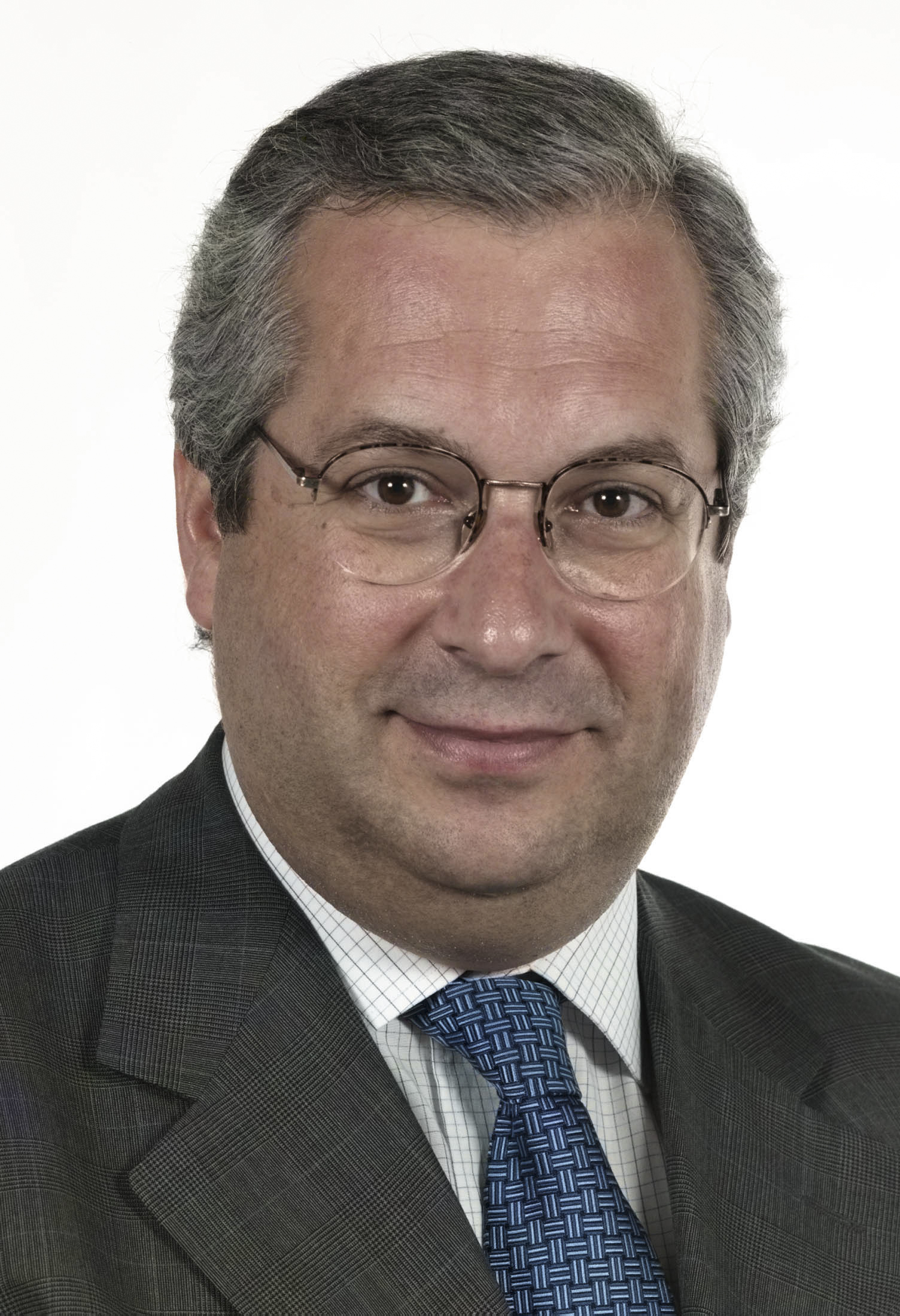
Queiró in 1999

Luís Queiró (born 2 July 1953) is a Portuguese politician and Member of the European Parliament for the CDS – People's Party, as part of the European People's Party–European Democrats group.

In 1977 he earned a law degree from the University of Coimbra Law School and has been a practicing lawyer in Portugal since; in January 2020 he retired and resigned his post of chairman of the CDS Party Convention.

He published Tempo Europeu, in 2009. He is a founding member of Eupportunity and a consultant on European affairs.
