= Mercedes Echerer =

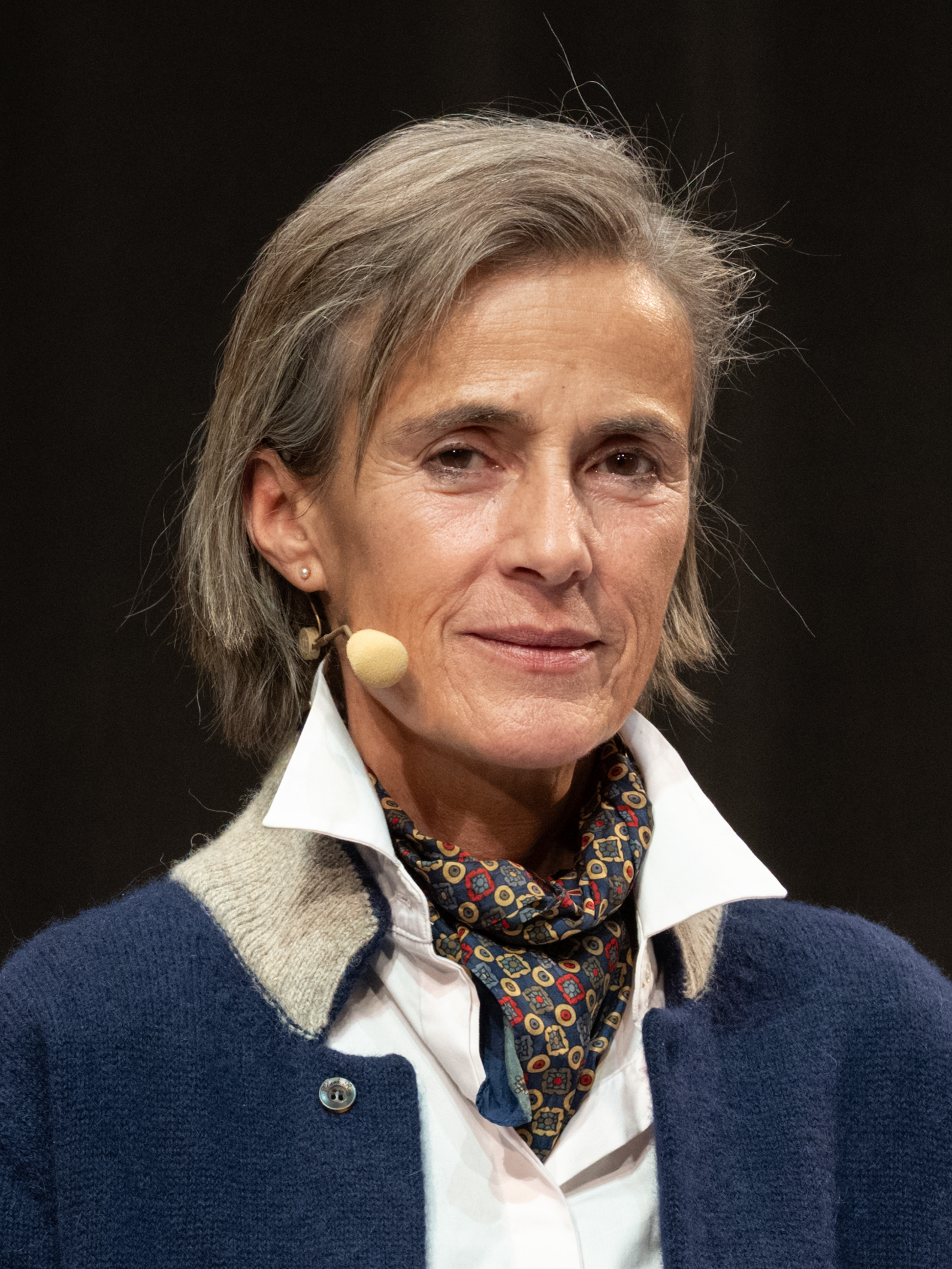
- Mercedes Echerer (2025)
- Born: Raina A. Mercedes Echerer; 16 May 1963 (age 63); Linz, Austria

Raina A. Mercedes Echerer (born 16 May 1963 in Linz) is an Austrian film and stage actress, host of TV and radio shows, and politician.

From 1999 to 2004 she was Member of the European Parliament (MEP) for the Austrian Green Party, part of the European Greens, although she was not member of the party. During her term she was member of the Committee on Culture, Youth, Education, the Media and Sport, and substitute for the Committee on Budgets and the Committee on Legal Affairs and the Internal Market.

In 1994 she also hosted the Prix Ars Electronica. In 2006 she played Elmire in Molière's Tartuffe at the Lower Austrian state theater in St. Pölten.

== Filmography ==
- Wanted (1999)
- Der See (1996)
- Halbe Welt (1993)
- Fahrt in die Hauptstadt (1991)
- Café de l'union (1990)
- Nachsaison (1988)
- Schmutz (1985)

=== TV ===
- Ein glücklicher Tag (2004)
- Unser Opa ist der Beste (1995)
- Landläufiger Tod (1990)
