= Paulo Casaca =

Portuguese politician

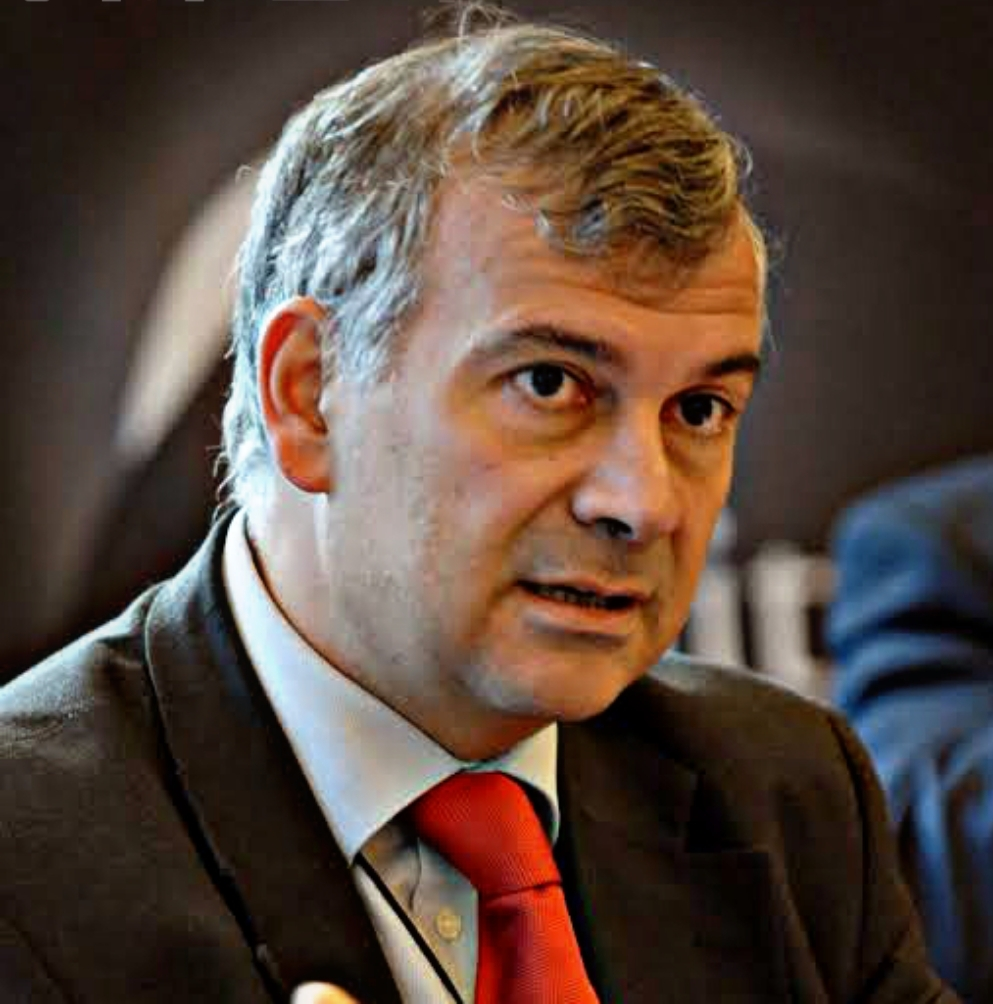

Chief of Staff of the Minister for Territorial Planning and Public Works

Member of the European Parliament for Portugal's Socialist Party (Partido Socialista)

Councillor of Portugal to the European Union(1986–1999)
- Constituency: The regional Azorean

Founder of Amnesty International section in Ponta Delgada, Azores

Personal details
- Born: Paulo Casaca; 2 July 1957 (age 68) Lisbon, Portugal
- Party: member of the regional Azorean and Portuguese parliaments
- Other political affiliations: councilor in the Permanent Representation of Portugal to the European Union (1996–1999); Chief of Staff of the Minister for Territorial Planning and Public Works (1995–1996) economics advisor for the Socialist fraction in the national parliament (1985–1995)

Paulo Casaca (born 2 July 1957, in Lisbon) is a Portuguese politician and was a Member of the European Parliament for Portugal's Socialist Party (Partido Socialista) and was also a part of the Party of European Socialists from 1999 to 2009. He was also a member of the regional Azorean and Portuguese parliaments.

Paulo Casaca is the founder and executive director of the "South Asia Democratic Forum," as well as the founder of the international co-operation association registered in Brussels, ARCHumankind, "Alliance to Renew Co-operation among Humankind", founder of the "Euro Reform Initiative", of the consultancy company on sustainable development registered in Brussels, "Less Means More", and Land and Energy Sustainable Systems. Fellow of the German Marshall Fund of the US in the first semester of 2010; team leader of a report commissioned by the US-based NGO Committee to Study the Organization of Peace "A Green Ray over Iraq" presented to the UN last March.

Paulo Casaca was a Member of the European Parliament for ten years where, namely, he chaired the delegation for relations with NATO Parliamentary Assembly. He was a councilor in the Permanent Representation of Portugal to the European Union from 1996 to 1999, Chief of Staff of the Minister for Territorial Planning and Public Works from 1995 to 1996, and economics advisor for the Socialist fraction in the national parliament from 1989 to 1990,1992, and 1994 to1995.

Previous to this position, he was a councillor in the Permanent Representation of Portugal to the European Union from 1996 to 1999, chief of staff of the Minister for Territorial Planning and Public Works in 1995/1996, economics advisor for the socialist fraction in the national parliament and Founder of Amnesty International section in Ponta Delgada, Azores. During his academic career, Paulo Casaca lectured at the Economics Departments of the Lisbon Accounting Institute and at the University of the Azores in 1980 and was then invited as a professor at the Lisbon Technical University.

He is the author of several books and reports on the economic and social affairs, Human Rights and the issue of religious fanaticism.
