= Marilies Flemming =

Austrian politician (1933–2023)

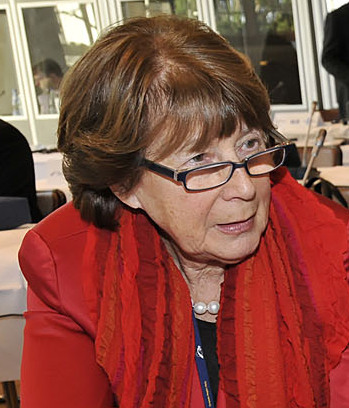
- Flemming in 2009

Member of the European Parliament for Austria
- In office 20 July 1999 – 19 July 2004

Personal details
- Born: 16 December 1933 Wiener Neustadt, Austria
- Died: 9 July 2023 (aged 89) Vienna, Austria
- Party: European People's Party Group
- Other political affiliations: Austrian People's Party
- Spouse: Wulf Flemming
- Education: University of Vienna
- Awards: Decoration of Honour for Services to the Republic of Austria

Marilies Flemming (16 December 1933 – 9 July 2023) was an Austrian politician who served as a Member of the European Parliament. In the European Parliament, she used the name Marialiese Flemming. She was a member of the European People's Party (Austrian People's Party domestically) and was first elected during the 1996 European Parliament election for Austria. Her European Parliamentary career ended on 19 July 2004.

== Career ==
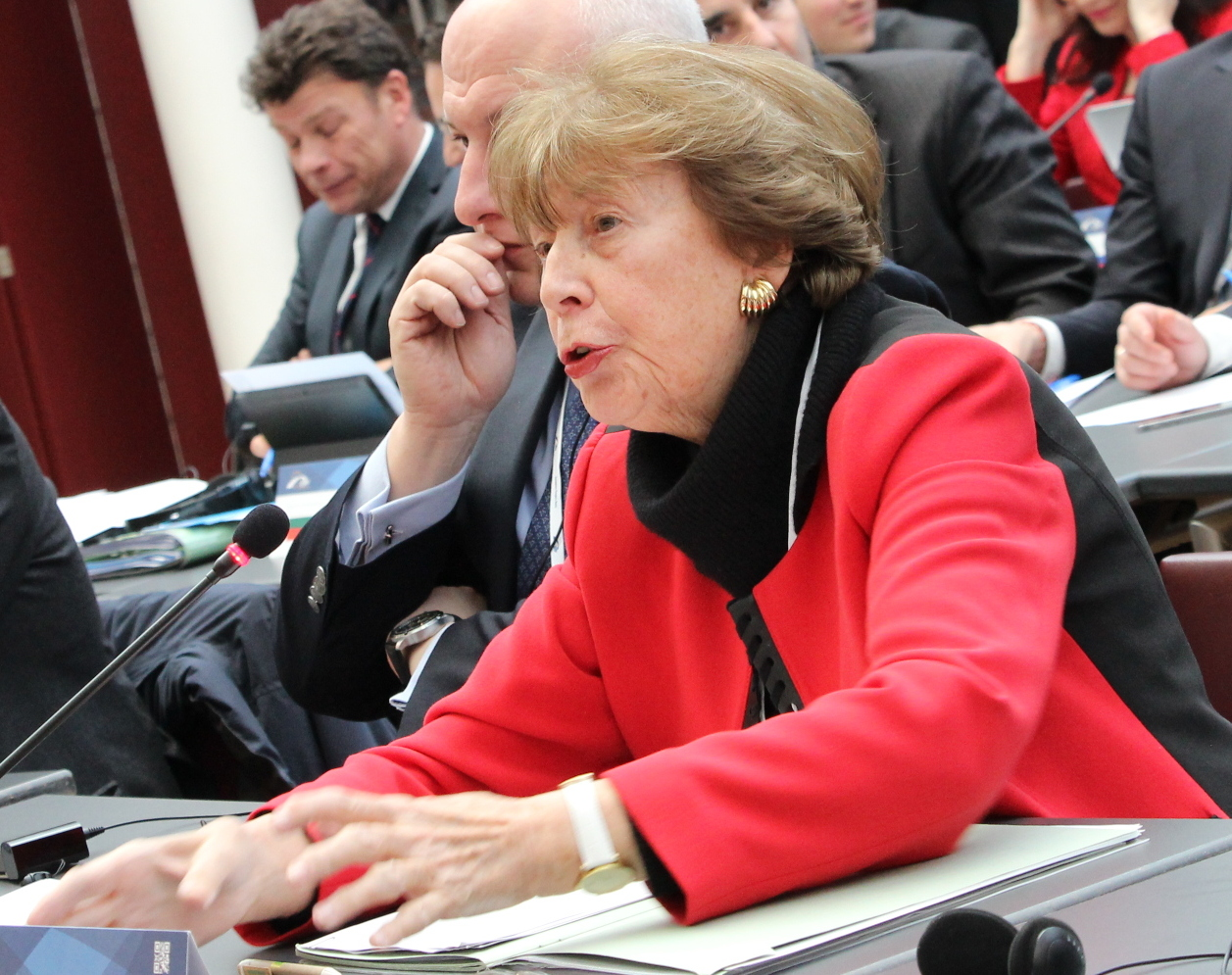
Flemming in March 2015

Flemming initially worked in banking, then built up a film company with her husband.

Flemming joined the Austrian People's Party in 1968 and was a member of the Municipal Council and Landtag of Vienna from 1973 until 1987, after which she became head of the Ministry of Agriculture, Regions and Tourism.

From 1999, Flemming served on various European Union-related delegations, committees and groups, including the Committee on the Environment, Public Health and Consumer Policy, and occasionally as a substitute on the Committee on Women's Rights (a precursor to the Committee on Women's Rights and Gender Equality) and the Committee on Research, Technological Development and Energy.

Flemming also held views on human cloning in line with that of the other Christian Democrat members of the European Parliament. In 2003, she tabled more than 80 amendments in the European Parliament to further restrict cloning research in European Union member states, suggesting the use of adult stem cells in research as opposed to embryos. Flemming was reported by The Telegraph as saying that the creation of embryos for the purpose of medical treatment is immoral because the "individual characteristics of a person" are created at the moment of conception.

In 2004, Czech Radio reported that the future European Commissioner for Health & Consumer Protection, Pavel Telička, had been involved in heated debate with Flemming over the issue of the Temelín Nuclear Power Station, a Czech nuclear power station located near the border with nuclear-free Austria. After these debates, Flemming was reported to describe Telicka as "sensational and absolutely perfect".

In 2016, Flemming was a member of the Executive Committee of the European Seniors' Union. In 2017, she was a representative of the Austrian Senior Council.

== Personal life ==
Marilies Flemming was born in Wiener Neustadt, Austria on 16 December 1933. She engaged in language studies in Paris and at the University of Cambridge and earned a law doctorate at the University of Vienna.

She was awarded the Decoration of Honour for Services to the Republic of Austria in 1990.

Flemming died on 9 July 2023, at the age of 89.
