= Elisa Maria Damião =

Portuguese politician (1946–2022)

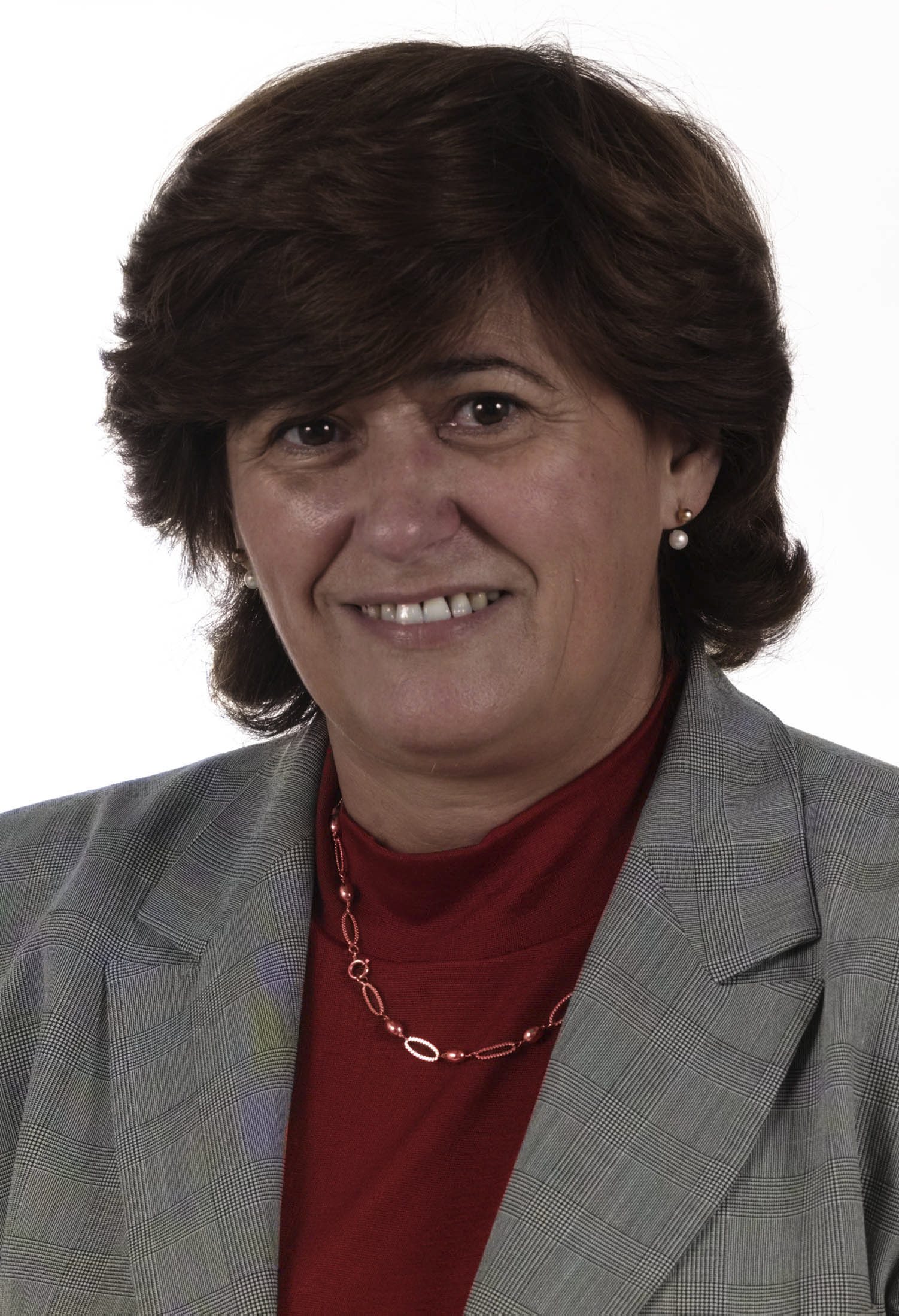
- Damião in 1999

Member of the European Parliament
- In office 3 October 1998 – 19 July 2004
- Constituency: Portugal

Member of the Assembly of the Republic of Portugal
- In office 13 August 1987 – 8 October 1998

Personal details
- Born: Elisa Maria Ramos Damião; 10 September 1946 Alcobaça, Alcobaça, Portugal
- Died: 7 May 2022 (aged 75)
- Party: PS
- Education: Universidade Lusófona

Elisa Maria Ramos Damião (10 September 1946 – 7 May 2022) was a Portuguese politician. A member of the Socialist Party, she served in the Assembly of the Republic from 1987 to 1998 and in the European Parliament from 1998 to 2004. She died on 7 May 2022 at the age of 75.
