= Karin Scheele =

Austrian politician

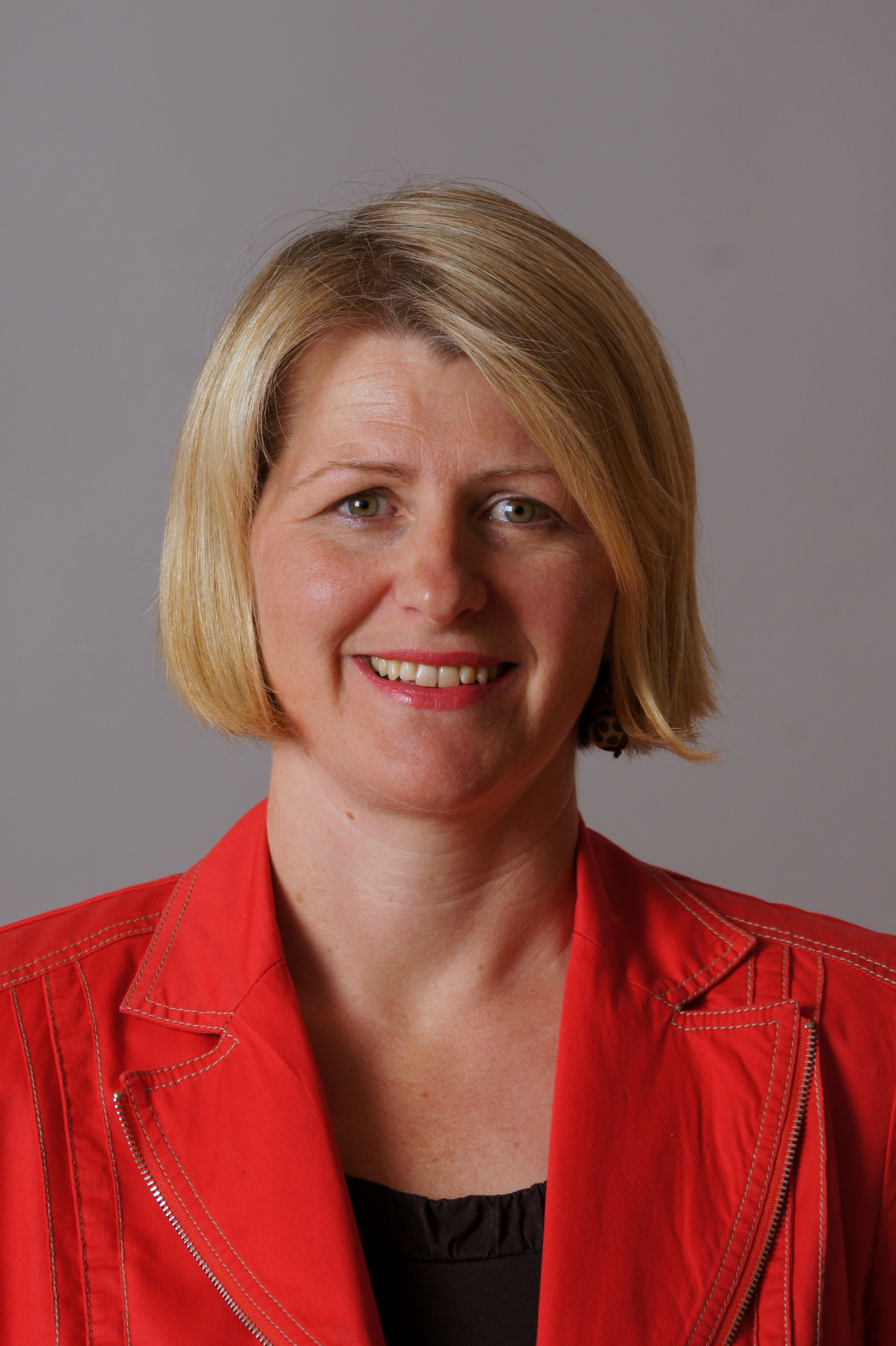
Karin Scheele 2013

Karin Scheele (born July 22, 1968 in Baden bei Wien) is an Austrian social democratic politician and was a member of the European Parliament from 1999 till 2008. In December 2008, she entered the regional government of her native Land of Lower Austria to become secretary in charge of Health and Social Affairs.

After graduating from the Vienna University of Economics and Business Administration she held various functions in the Austrian Socialist Youth Movement, in the International Union of Socialist Youth and in the Austrian Social Democratic Party.

She has been a member of the Austrian Western Sahara society since 1994 and was a member of the Western Sahara working group of the European Parliament.
