= Gerhard Hager =

Austrian politician (1942–2025)

Gerhard Hager (26 September 1942 – 18 April 2025) was an Austrian politician who was a non-attached Member of the European Parliament. His two European Parliamentary terms began on 11 November 1996 and 20 July 1999, culminating in his European Parliament career's ending on 19 July 2004.

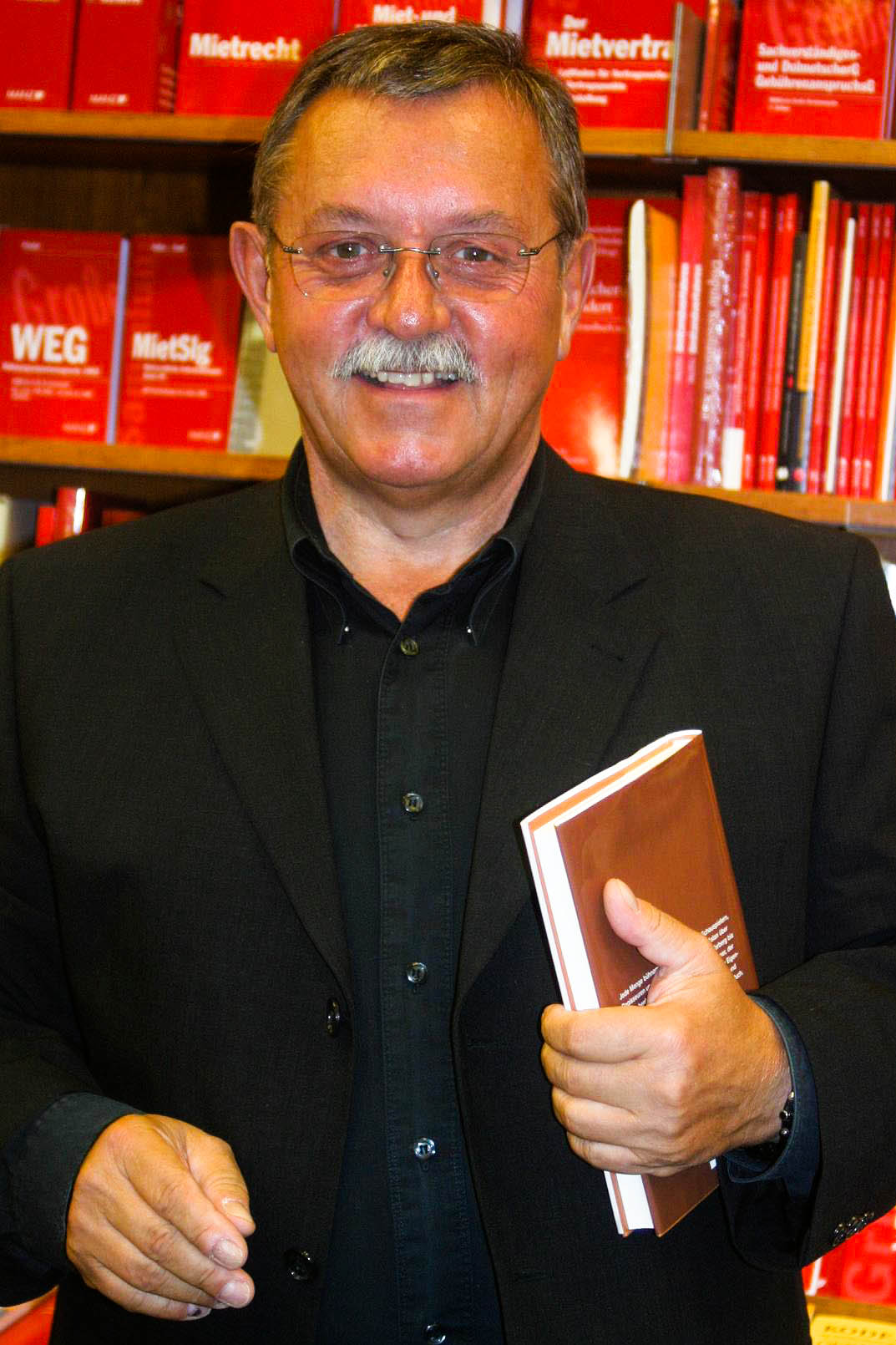
Hager holding one of his books at a bookstore

== Early life ==
Hager was born in Vienna, Austria on 26 September 1942, as the nephew of Gustav Krist and grew up under the impressions of the aftermath of World War II. From 1948 to 1952 Hager attended primary school before attending another school from 1952 to 1960. After leaving school, he studied law at the University of Vienna, graduating from there in 1966.

== Political career ==
During the 1970s and 1980s, Hager served in positions such as a Judge of the High Court and President of the Senate. In 1991, he was appointed Councillor of the Supreme Court. He also worked as a lecturer at the University of Vienna.

In May 1994, the president accorded him the title of professor.

On 11 November 1996, Hager began his term as a Member of the European Parliament representing Austria. For most of his parliamentary term, he was a member of the right-wing populist Austrian Freedom Party, but left the party on 14 February 2003.

During his first term as a Member of the European Parliament, Hager served on the Committee on Institutional Affairs and the Committee on the Rules of Procedure, the Verification of Credentials and Immunities. During his second term, He participated in the Committee on Petitions, the Committee on Legal Affairs, the Committee on Industry, Research and Energy and the Committee on Constitutional Affairs, although, during Hager's time, most of these bore different names. At times, he served as a substitute on the Committee on Economic and Monetary Affairs and Industrial Policy and the Committee on Legal Affairs and the Internal Market.

== Personal life and death ==
After being retired in 2004, Hager occasionally held literature presentations in front of small audiences. Besides, he spent his time exploring nature.

Hager was married, father of a son and owner of a female Parson Russell terrier. He died on 18 April 2025, at the age of 82.

== Publications ==
=== Technical ===
- "Nichtigkeitsbeschwerde und Berufung“, Manz 1981 (together with attorney Dr. Meller). The second edition was published 2004 in cooperation with attorney Dr. Eichenseder.
- "Persönlichkeitsschutz im Straf- und Medienrecht“, Medien & Recht 1991 (second and third editions in cooperation with vice president of the Supreme Court, Dr. Walenta).
- "§§ 15 und 16 StGB“, Manz 1994 (in cooperation with Dr. Massauer)
- "Grundrechtsbeschwerdegesetz 1992", Manz 1998 (in cooperation with Dr. Holzweber)

=== Fiction ===
- "Hager, Heiteres vom Höchstgericht“, Anekdoten; Manz 1995
- "Wie bring' ich meinen Mann ins Grab?“, Satire, OVG 2000
- "Am Brunnen weit vom Tore“, Erzählung, R.G. Fischer, 2003
- " E rnstes und U nernstes rund um das Europäische Parlament“ Anekdoten, OVG 2004
