= Peter Sichrovsky =

Austrian journalist and politician

Peter Sichrovsky (born 5 September 1947) is an Austrian journalist, writer, former politician and Member of the European Parliament. He belonged to the Freedom Party of Austria during his two terms in the European Parliament, although he was officially non-attached.

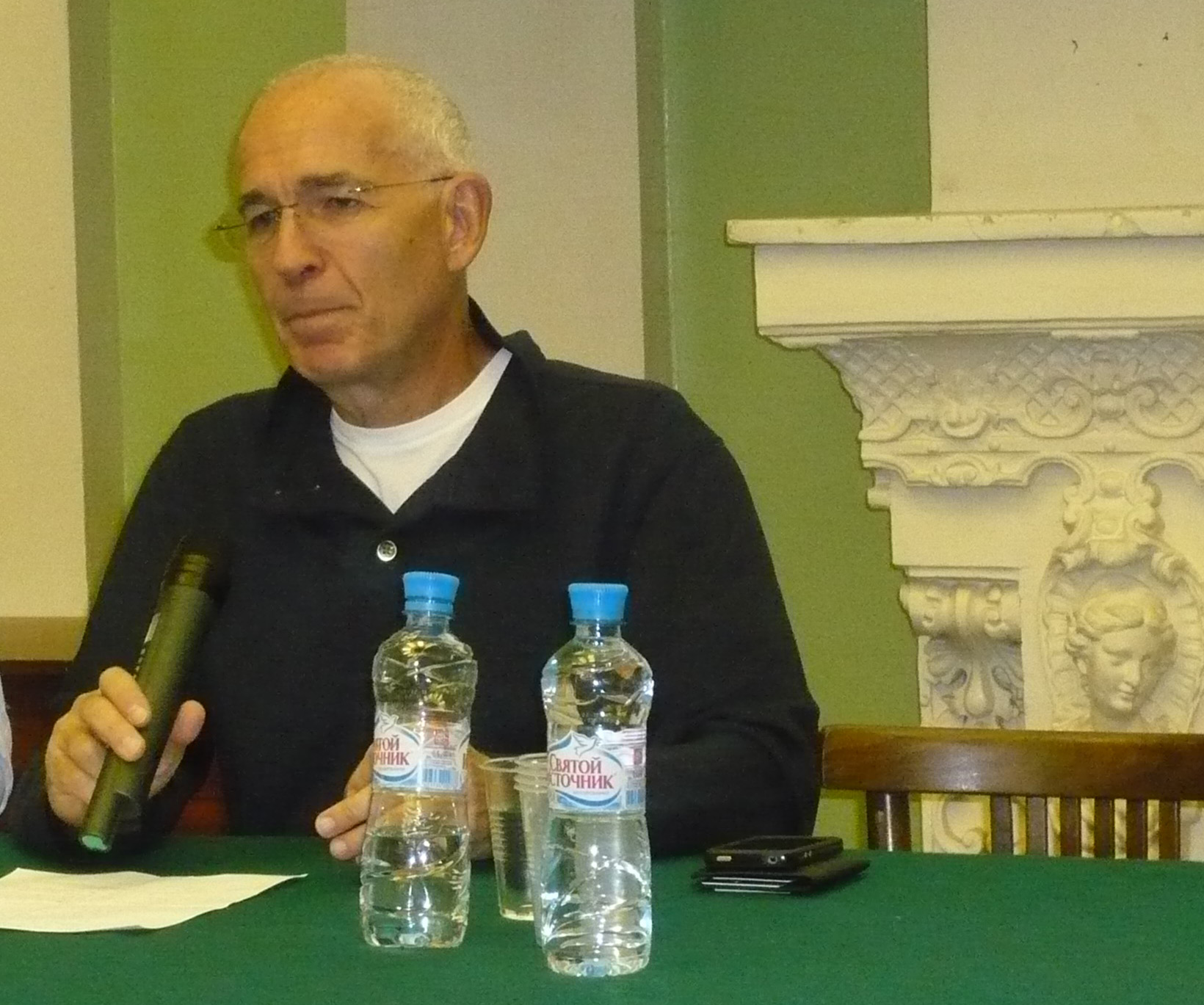
Peter Sichrovsky

== Early life ==
Peter Sichrovsky was born and raised in Vienna, Austria. His father was spared by an SS officer as a teenager, after they were caught trying to flee to Belgium. He lost most of his family to the Holocaust.

From 1963 to 1968, Sichrovsky studied at the Higher Technical School of Biochemistry in Vienna, graduating from there to study pharmacy and chemistry at the University of Vienna from 1970 to 1975.

After receiving his university qualifications, Sichrovsky became a high school chemistry and physics teacher, leaving education in 1976 to take up management positions in various pharmaceutical companies.

From 1980, Sichrovsky found employment as a journalist in a variety of newspapers, including Der Spiegel, Männer Vogue, and Der Standard, which he co-founded in 1988.

After positions in Europe, Sichrovsky travelled abroad to New Delhi and Hong Kong to become a foreign correspondent there.

During the 1990s, he continued his trips abroad through Hong Kong, Vienna, Chicago, and Los Angeles.

== Political career ==
He first made headlines for, whilst working for Der Standard, dubbing Jörg Haider (leader of the Freedom Party of Austria who described the Waffen SS as “men of honour”), as “the scum that floats to the surface”. But he would soon join Haider's FPÖ, defending Haider's controversial words about the SS by claiming that "not every SS man was a devil and not every concentration camp survivor was a saint”.

On 11 November 1996, Sichrovsky was elected to the European Parliament as a representative of his home country. Although he was a parliamentary member of the Freedom Party of Austria, he was considered non-attached as his party did not have the required number of seats in the European Parliament to form a political group.

Sichrovsky served on several committees during his two terms in the European Parliament, including the Committee on External Economic Relations, the Subcommittee on Security and Disarmament, the Committee on Culture, Youth, Education, the Media and Sport and the Delegation to the EU-Kazakhstan, EU-Kyrgyzstan and EU-Uzbekistan Parliamentary Cooperation Committees and Delegation for relations with Tajikistan, Turkmenistan, and Mongolia.

From 2000 to 2002, Sichrovsky was the general secretary of the Freedom Party of Austria.

Facing the prospects of leaving the European Parliament, in 2003, he would claim that his "political career has been something of a failure", since he failed to "establish a democratic right-wing platform", lamenting that the parliament remained "dominated by two large groups, the centre-right European People’s Party (EPP) and the socialists.”

Sichrovsky is a controversial figure within the conservative right. Some opine that because of his Jewish origin, he was supposed to help Haider's party make peace with Jews.

== Other works ==
Sichrovsky has written fifteen books, including four children's books, plays, and screenplays.

In 1986, an English translation of Sichrovsky's book Wir wissen nicht was morgen wird, wir wissen wohl was gestern war: Junge Juden in Deutschland und Österreich, a collection of interviews with the children of Jewish holocaust victims and survivors, was published as Strangers in their own land: Young Jews in Germany and Austria today.

Two years later, in 1988, an English translation of Schuldig geboren: Kinder aus Nazifamilien, a collection of interviews with children of Nazi parents, was published as Born Guilty: Children of Nazi Families.

Controversially, the interviews were thought to be fictitious by his former friend Niklas Frans, who inferred it from a discussion with Peter.
