= Daniela Raschhofer =

Austrian politician (born 1960)

Daniela Raschhofer MEP
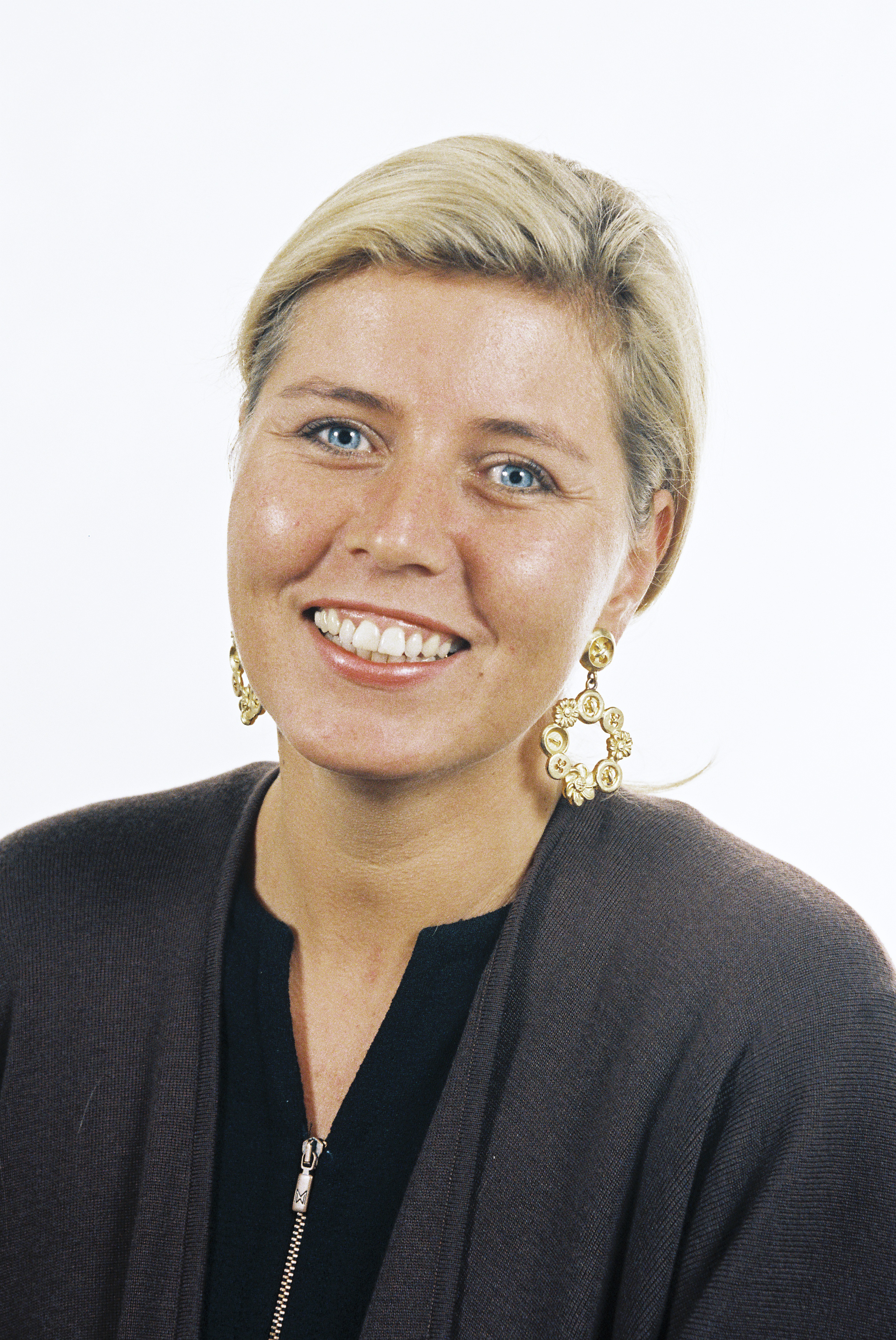

Member of the European Parliament for Austria
- In office 11 November 1996 – 19 July 2004

Personal details
- Born: 19 June 1960 Braunau am Inn, Austria
- Party: Freedom Party of Austria

Daniela Raschhofer (b. 19 June 1960 at Braunau am Inn, Austria) is an Austrian politician, former Member of the European Parliament for Austria, belonging to the Freedom Party of Austria.

Daniela Raschhofer was born on 19 June 1960 at Braunau am Inn, Austria. After finishing elementary school, Raschhofer passed her Matura at a high school for women's economic occupation. After training to become an elementary school teacher in Salzburg, Raschhofer moved to Linz and studied to become a vocational teacher. She also worked in a law office, spent a year abroad in Paris, and taught in her birth town of Braunau am Inn. In 1991, Raschhofer became a member of the Upper Austrian Landtag, and also a became a member of the council of Braunau am Inn the same year. In 1996 she ceased being a member of her landtag, as on 11 November 1996 she became a Member of the European Parliament, representing Austria as a member of the Freedom Party of Austria.

During her time as a Member of the European Parliament, Raschhofer served on the Committee on Agriculture and Rural Development, the Committee on Regional Policy, the Committee on Industry, External Trade, Research and Energy and the Members from the European Parliament to the Joint Assembly of the Agreement between the African, Caribbean and Pacific States and the European Union. She also served sporadically as a committee member of the Committee on the Environment, Public Health and Consumer Protection, the Committee on Culture, Youth, Education, the Media and Sport and the Committee on Women's Rights and Equal Opportunities.

In 2003, a Grand Decoration of Honour in Gold for Services to the Republic of Austria was conferred upon Raschhofer by Andreas Khol.
