= Hubert Pirker =

Austrian politician (born 1948)

Hubert Pirker (born 3 October 1948 in Gries) is an Austrian politician and a Member of the European Parliament. He is a member of the Austrian People's Party, which is affiliated with the Group of the European People's Party (Christian Democrats) and European Democrats in the European Parliament.

He was a member of the Committee on Foreign Affairs, the Subcommittee on Security and Defence, the temporary Committee on the alleged use of European countries by the CIA for the transport and illegal detention of prisoners, and the delegation for relations with the Korean Peninsula. He was also a substitute for the Committee on Civil Liberties, Justice and Home Affairs.

After studying education and communication theory and receiving his diploma and doctorate, Hubert Pirker worked as a teacher of mathematics from 1967 to 1980. He worked as a professor of education at a teacher training academy and became head of research projects at the University of Klagenfurt and for the Ministry of Science. He then became a communication and management consultant.

Since 1989, Pirker has served as Land chairman of the Austrian Employees' Federation. Between 1990 and 1994 he was the Austrian People's Party spokesman on security. He has been the Austrian People's Party spokesman on European Union security policy since 1996. From 1990 to 1994, Hubert Pirker served as a member of the Nationalrat. In 1999 he became the deputy head of the Austrian People's Party delegation to the European Parliament, the coordinator for home affairs and justice, and the European People's Party spokesman on security.

Hubert Pirker was previously a member during the 4th and 5th terms of the European Parliament, beginning in 1996. During this time, he served on the Committee on Civil Liberties and Internal Affairs, the Committee on the Rules of Procedure, the Verification of Credentials and Immunities, the delegation for relations with the Member States of ASEAN, South-east Asia and the Republic of Korea, and the Committee on Citizens' Freedoms and Rights, Justice and Home Affairs. In 2000 and 2001 he served on a temporary committee on the Echelon interception system. He substituted for the Committee on Social Affairs and Employment and the delegation for relations with Slovenia. He left the European Parliament in 2004 but became once again a member from 2006 to 2009. He once again entered the European Parliament in March 2011, replacing Ernst Strasser, who resigned after his involvement in the 2011 cash for influence scandal. Currently he is a member of the committees on Transport and Tourism and Civil Liberties, Justice and Home Affairs.
