= Greece (European Parliament constituency) =

Constituency of the European Parliament

- European Parliament constituency
- Location among the current constituencies
- Member state: Greece
- Created: 1981
- MEPs: 24 (1981–1994); 25 (1994–2004); 24 (2004–2009); 22 (2009–2014); 21 (2014–present)

Greece is a European Parliament constituency for elections in the European Union covering the member state of Greece.

It is currently represented by twenty-one Members of the European Parliament.

== Representation of Greece in the European Parliament ==
Greece has had a delegation of Members of the European Parliament in the European Parliament since Greek accession to the EU in 1981. Originally, the Greek delegation numbered 25, but after 2004 that was reduced to 24 (due to the increase of the EU member countries). In 2009, it was further reduced to 22, and in 2014 to 21 MEPs.

== Electoral system ==
In the European elections, the whole country forms a single constituency and an electoral threshold is set at 3% of the vote.

Until 2014, the MEPs were elected every five years on the basis of a party-list proportional representation system. Just a few weeks ahead of the 2014 European Parliament election, the Greek parliament changed the regulations for European Parliament elections (Law 4255/2014). Doing away with closed lists, candidates are now elected on the basis of individual preference votes with a maximum of four preferences per voter. The number of candidates per electoral list was doubled from 21 to 42 and the maximum campaign expenses per candidate were raised to 135,000 Euro.

== Elections ==
=== 1981 ===
The 1981 European election was a by-election held after Greece joined the European Communities in 1981. The rest of the EC had voted in 1979.

=== 1984 ===
The 1984 European election was the second election to the European Parliament and the first time Greece voted with the rest of the Community. The elections were held on 15 June 1984.

=== 1989 ===
The 1989 European election was the third election to the European Parliament and the third for Greece. The elections were held on 15 June 1989.

=== 1994 ===
The 1994 European election was the fourth election to the European Parliament and the fourth for Greece. The elections were held on 12 June 1994.

=== 1999 ===
The 1999 European election was the fifth election to the European Parliament and the fifth for Greece. The elections were held on 13 June 1999.

=== 2004 ===
The 2004 European election was the sixth election to the European Parliament and the sixth for Greece. The elections were held on 13 June 2004. The ruling New Democracy party made strong gains, while the opposition Panhellenic Socialist Movement made smaller gains, both at the expense of minor parties.

=== 2009 ===
The 2009 European election was the seventh election to the European Parliament and the seventh for Greece.

=== 2014 ===
The 2014 European election was the eighth election to the European Parliament and the eighth for Greece.

=== 2019 ===
The 2019 European election was the ninth election to the European Parliament and the ninth for Greece.

=== 2024 ===
The 2024 European election was the tenth election to the European Parliament and the tenth for Greece.
