= Harald Ettl =

Austrian politician

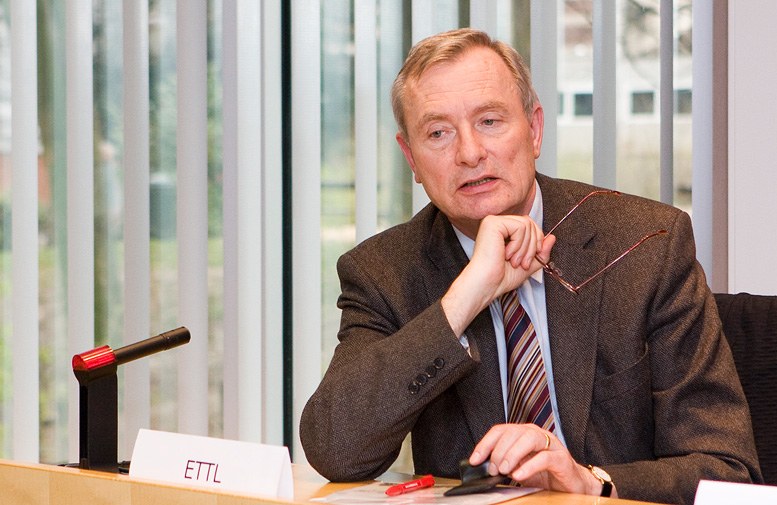
Harald Ettl, Brussel 2008.

Harald Ettl (born 7 December 1947 in Gleisdorf, Styria) is an Austrian politician who served as a Member of the European Parliament from 1996 until 2009. He is a member of the Social Democratic Party, which is part of the Party of European Socialists.

During his time in Parliament, Ettle served on the Committee on Employment and Social Affairs. He was also a substitute for the Committee on Economic and Monetary Affairs, a member of the delegation to the EU–Bulgaria Joint Parliamentary Committee, and a substitute for the delegation for relations with the Mashreq countries.

== Education ==
- 1968: Diploma from higher technical education institute

== Career ==
- 1969-1971: Technical employee
- 1971-1973: Trade union secretary
- Secretary-General (1973-1984) and President (1984-2000) of the Textile, Clothing and Leather Workers' Union
- since 2000: Vice-President of the Metal and Textile Union
- since 2004: Vice-President of the International Textile, Clothing and Leather Workers' Association
- 1978-1989: Vice-Chairman of the General Accident Insurance Institution (AUVA)
- 1978-1989: Chairman of the accident insurance committee, Main Association of Austrian Social Insurance Institutions
- 1987-1999: Chairman of the EU Committee, Austrian Federation of Trade Unions
- 1989-1992: Federal Minister for Health, the Public Service, Sport and Consumer Protection
- 1993-2001: Chairman of the Consumer Information Association
- 1995-1996: Member of the Economic and Social Committee of the European Communities
- 1996-2009: Member of the European Parliament
