= Herbert Bösch =

Austrian politician

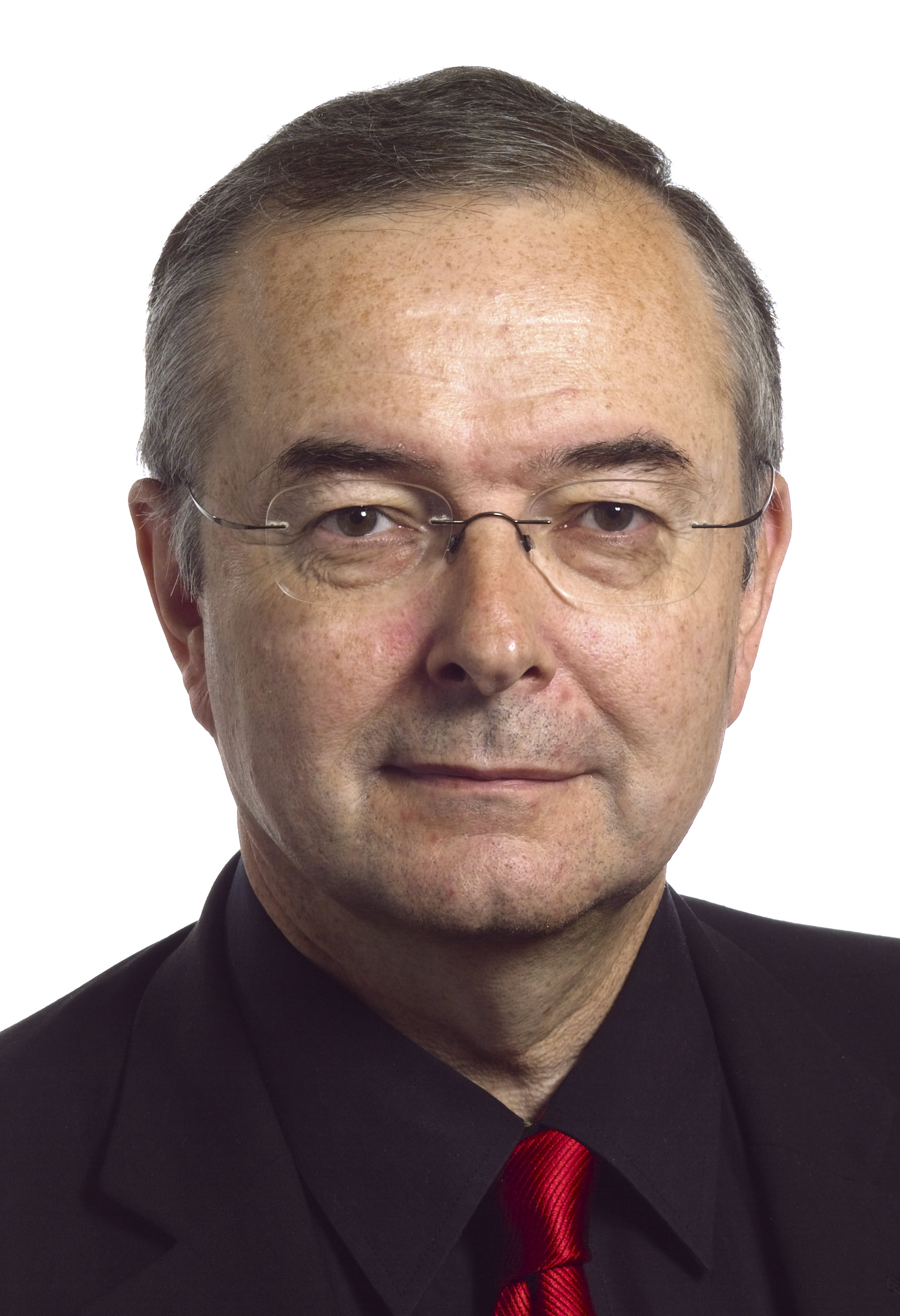
- Bösch in 2004

Member of the European Parliament for Austria
- In office 1995 – 14 July 2009

Personal details
- Born: 11 September 1954 (age 71) Feldkirch, Vorarlberg, Austria
- Party: SPÖ
- Education: University of Konstanz

Herbert Bösch (born 11 September 1954) is an Austrian politician who served as a Member of the European Parliament (MEP) from 1995 until 2009.

== Early life and career ==
Bösch studied sociology and politology at the University of Konstanz. After finishing his studies he was employed in the administration of the federal state capital Bregenz.

== Political career ==
From 1989 to 1994 Bösch served as a member of the Federal Council of Austria (Bundesrat) for the Social Democratic Party of Austria (SPÖ), then a member of the National Council of Austria (Nationalrat) until he became a Member of the European Parliament.

In the European Parliament, Bösch was a member of the Committee on Budgets from 1995 until 1999. In 1997, he joined the Committee on Budgetary Control, which he chaired from 2007 until 2009. In the 2009 elections, he failed to win re-election.

== Other activities ==
- European Anti-Fraud Office (OLAF), Member of the Supervisory Committee (2012-2015)

== Personal life ==
Bösch is married and has three children.
