= Agnes Schierhuber =

Austrian politician (born 1946)

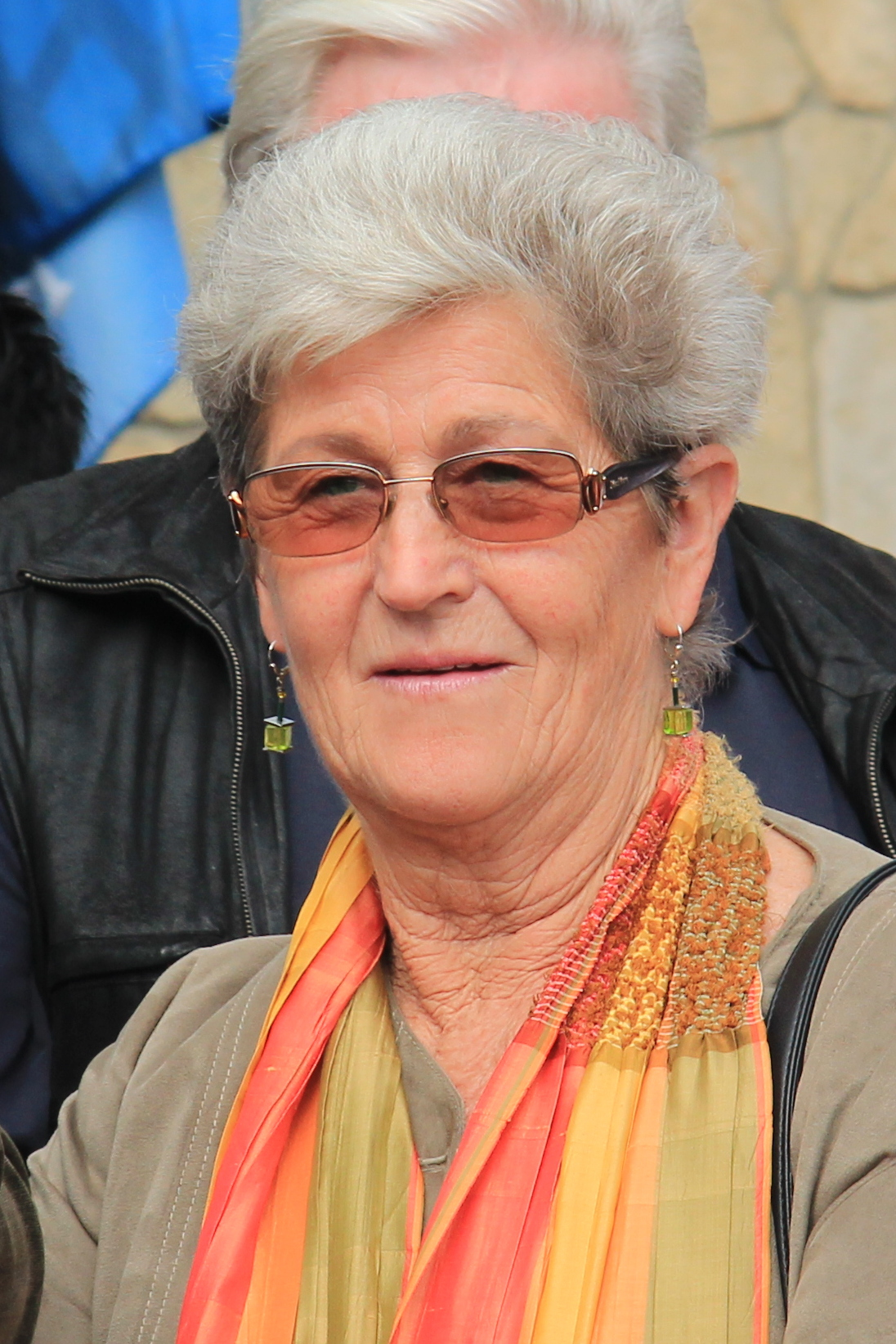
Agnes Schierhuber

Agnes Schierhuber (born 31 May 1946) is an Austrian politician and Member of the European Parliament (MEP). She is a member of the Austrian People's Party, which is part of the European People's Party.

Schierhuber has been a member of the European Parliament since 1995 and currently sits as a full member of the Agriculture and Rural
Development Committee. She is also part of the Delegation for relations with Canada. As a substitute member she sits on the Employment and Social Affairs Committee. She is the vice-chairwoman of the EPP-ED Group working party on agricultural and budgetary issues.

== Career ==
- Completed agricultural school (1964)
- Passed specialist examination (1975)
- Member, ÖVP Local and District Executive (since 1975)
- Member, Executive Committee, Lower Austria Farmers' Federation (since 1985)
- Vice-chair, Ottenschlag Farmers' Chamber (1975-1995)
- Ottenschlag Women Farmers' Representative (1974-1994)
- Vice-chair, Ottenschlag Raiffeisenkassen supervisory board (since 1980)
- Member, Regional Executive, Farmers' Social Insurance Institute (SVB) (1983-1998)
- Member, Lower Austria Regional Chamber of Agriculture (1985-1986)
- Member, Bundesrat (1986-1996)
- Member of the European Parliament (since 1995)
- Appointed Ökonomierat (2000)
- Vice-chair, EPP-ED Group working party on agricultural and budgetary issues (since 2003)
- Chair, Austrian Association for Medicinal and Herbal Horticulture (since 1993)
- Chair, Waldviertel Specialist Growers' Association (since 2003)

== Honours ==
- 1995: Decoration for Services to the Republic of Austria in Silver
- 1996: Silver Medal of the Chamber of Agriculture of Lower Austria
- 1996: Leopold Figl Silver Medal
- 2005: Grand Decoration of Honour in Gold for Services to the Republic of Austria
- 2006: Gold Medal of the Chamber of Agriculture of Lower Austria
- 2006: Gold Decoration of the Farmers Association from Lower Austria
