= Reinhard Rack =

Austrian politician (born 1945)

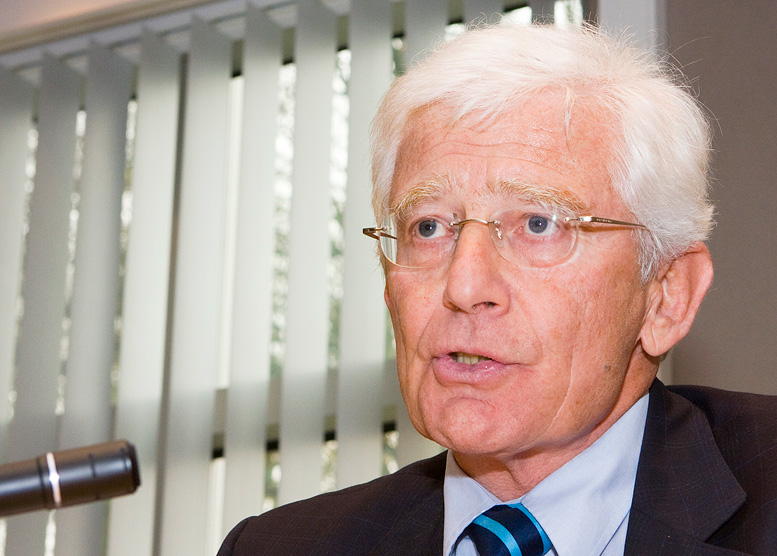
Reinhard Rack (2008)

Reinhard Rack (born 7 August 1945 in Leoben, Styria) is an Austrian politician and a former Member of the European Parliament (1995–2009). He is a member of the Austrian People's Party, which is part of the European People's Party, and was sitting on the European Parliament's Committee on Transport and Tourism.

He was also a substitute for the Committee on Constitutional Affairs, a member of the delegation for relations with Australia and New Zealand, and a substitute for the delegation for relations with Japan.

== Career ==
- Studied law and interpreting at the University of Graz (1964-1968)
- Dr.jur
- Qualified translator
- University assistant (1968)
- Postdoctoral lecturing qualification (1976)
- University professor in constitutional, administrative and European law (since 1980)
- Visiting professor, Rutgers University, Camden/New Jersey (1985 and 1988)
- Academic publications in Austria and abroad
- Visiting lecturer, University of Malaysia (UMESP), Kuala Lumpur (2001)
- Spokesman on European affairs for the Land of Styria (1990-1994)
- Member of the Nationalrat (1994-1995 and in 1996)
- Member of the European Parliament (1995-2009)
- ÖVP Head of Delegation (1995-1996)
- Vice-Chairman, Group of the European People's Party, European Parliament (1996-1999)
- Vice-Chairman, EPP-ED Group, European Parliament
- Member, Convention for drafting a European Charter of Fundamental Human Rights (1999-2000)
- Member, Convention on the Future of Europe (2002-2003)
- Member, Austria Convention (since 2003
