= Maria Gabriella Zen =

Italian composer (born 1957)

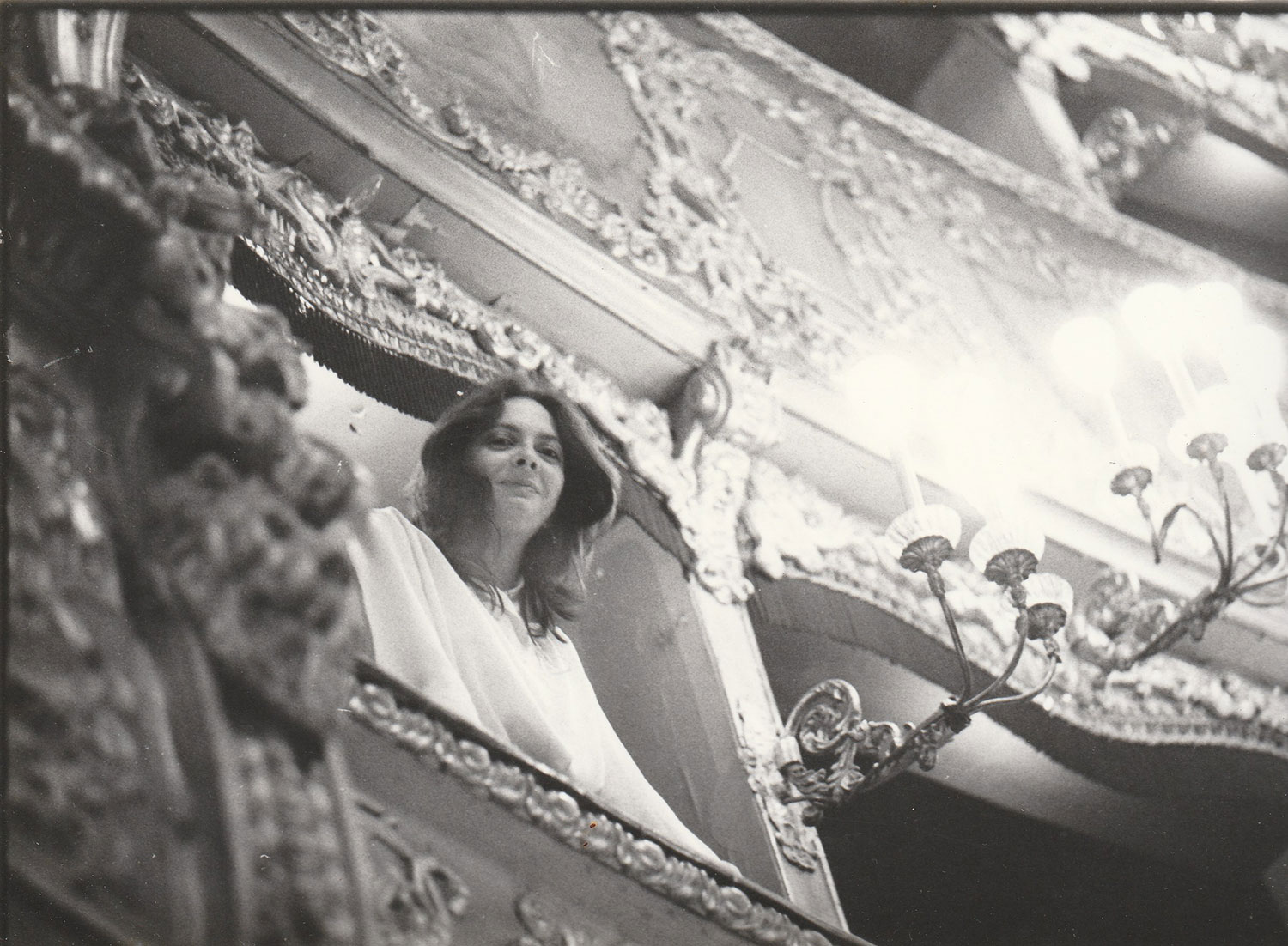
- Maria Gabriella Zen photo Mark Edward Smith

Personal details
- Born: 3 November 1957 (age 68) Italy
- Occupation: Composer

Maria Gabriella Zen (born 3 November 1957) is an Italian composer.

== Biography ==
Maria Gabriella Zen completed her education through studies in both music and humanities, graduating in Piano (1977), Choral Music and Choir Conducting (1979), and Composition (1985) at the Conservatory of Music "C. Pollini" in Padua. She also earned a Bachelor's degree in Literature with a thesis in Music History (1982) and a PhD in Linguistics (2012) from Ca' Foscari University of Venice. Her compositional training, undertaken under the guidance of Wolfango Dalla Vecchia, continued at the Accademia Musicale Chigiana in Siena with Franco Donatoni during the Summer Advanced Courses of 1982 and 1983.

In 1986, her chamber opera L'amore di Don Perlimplino con Belisa nel giardino with text after Federico García Lorca was in the final short list of the Internationaler Carl-Maria-von-Weber-Wettbewerb für Kammeropern 1986 at the Semperoper in Dresden. On March 27, 1993, the Arditti Quartet performed her first string quartet Liederkreis at the Teatro La Fenice in Venice. In November 1993, her piece Salmi for solo soprano was among the finalists in the Olympia International Composition Competition in Athens.

She represented Italy in the 3rd Workshop for Artists of the EU organized in October 2003 by the European Parliament in Oslip, Austria, with In der Wüste for mezzo-soprano, contralto, and percussion. In Spring 2004, along with ten other European composers, she participated in writing the suite 11-Eleven, commissioned by the EU to commemorate the victims of terrorism and the accession of new nations to the EU on May 1, 2004, with the XIth movement (Finale: Pax, luminosa Pax). On October 8, 2004, she represented Italy at the Concert of New Music by European composers that inaugurated the Rossi Hall of the reconstructed Teatro La Fenice. Invited to various editions of "Nuove Musiche d'Europa," a contemporary music festival organized by EU-ART-Network at the Apollinee Halls of the Teatro La Fenice, she composed Canzona magnetica (2006) and Die Linien des Lebens... (2007) for I Virtuosi della Fenice (the Septet of the First Parts of the Orchestra).

For the Festivaletteratura in 2007 in Mantua, in collaboration with Gianfranco De Bosio, she realized the complete reading of Virgil's Bucolics: the students from the School of the Piccolo Teatro di Milano "acted-singing" the ten Eclogues accompanied by musicians from the Conservatory of Mantua, in a contemporary reinterpretation of the ancient fusion of music and poetry. (Palazzo D'Arco, Mantua, September 5–8, 2007)

Her project for a new opera, supported by the Italian Institute for Opera and Poetry of Verona, won Funding for the Culture Programme 2007–2013 from the European Education and Culture Executive Agency (EACEA) of the European Union. The libretto of the opera Chronos parádoksos (2007/2010), written with Gianfranco De Bosio, received the VIII Giacomo Matteotti Award from the Presidency of the Council of Ministers on October 17, 2012 (Section II – literary and theatrical works), "awarded annually to works that illustrate the ideals of brotherhood among peoples, freedom, and social justice, which have inspired the life of Giacomo Matteotti."

In November 2008, the Orchestra i Pomeriggi Musicali of Milan, conducted by Stanley Dodds, with narrator Stefania Felicioli, performed at the Teatro Dal Verme the Melologue Ultime rime d'amore on sonnets from the Canzoniere for Bartolomeo Zen by Gaspara Stampa (1551–1554). In January 2010, her video-melologue Il Regno dei Fanes, based on texts from the Ladin legend of Dolasilla and letters from the front by Giuseppe and Eugenio Garrone (1915–1917), was performed at the Apollinee Halls of the Teatro La Fenice. The video was created by Margot Galante Garrone from photos of the First World War in the Dolomites.

The Biennale di Venezia commissioned her, as part of the 54th International Festival of Contemporary Music, Don Giovanni, variations on the myth, seven variations for female choir, percussion, and organ in a faraway room, which was performed at Palazzo Pisani Santo Stefano during the Inaugural Event (Opera-Labyrinth Don Giovanni in Venice) on September 23, 24, and 25, 2010.

She participated in two Contemporary Marathons organized by the Teatro La Fenice as part of the "Lo Spirito della Musica di Venezia" Festival: in 2013 with Canzona a tre on a theme by Giovanni Gabrieli and in 2014 with Tre frammenti da Stabat Mater by Tiziano Scarpa.

The European String Teachers Association commissioned her to compose contemporary music for the opening concert of the 47th International Congress held in Italy in 2019. Variazioni e Corale sulla Follia debuted at the Arvedi Auditorium of the Museo del Violino in Cremona on April 27, 2019, performed by the ESTA String Orchestra.

She has collaborated with important directors of Italian theater (Gianfranco De Bosio, Carlo Cecchi, Bepi Morassi, Stefano Pagin, Damiano Michieletto, Boris Stetka) writing stage music for shows by various authors, from Ruzante to Hugo Pratt. In 1989, she won the Orione New Musical Proposals Award from Rai Radio 3 for the stage music for Le baruffe chiozzotte by Carlo Goldoni in the de Bosio-Luzzati-Calì 1988 edition. From 1989 to 2006, she was the resident composer of the Teatro a l'Avogaria in Venice, with which she participated in many international tours and the 38th International Theater Festival of the Biennale di Venezia in July 2006. From October 27 to 31, 2008, as part of the International Workshop Mediterraneo of the Theater Festival of the Biennale di Venezia, he held the Composition Seminar for Stage Music Studio su Orlando. Orlando by Virginia Woolf, theatrical adaptation and direction by Stefano Pagin, then debuted on February 22, 2009, as part of the 40th International Theater Festival of the Biennale di Venezia. In 2011, the show was resumed in the version for a single actor (Stefano Scandaletti) titled Orlando-Orlando and won the OFF 2011 Award from the Teatro Goldoni (Venice) and, in September 2012, the national Argot OFF 2012 Award.

In October 2006, she wrote the stage music for the complete reading of Il Milione by Marco Polo, with artistic direction by Gianfranco De Bosio and images by Emanuele Luzzati, produced by the Teatro Fondamenta Nuove di Venezia on the occasion of the celebrations of the 750th anniversary of the birth of Marco Polo. The recorded tracks gave rise to an educational DVD in 2008 and were published in open-access audiobook format on September 15, 2021, on the Veneto Culture Portal of Regione del Veneto.

In 1994, she began collaborating with the Interdisciplinary Laboratory for Natural and Human Sciences of the SISSA (International School for Advanced Studies) in Trieste, directed by Claudio Magris. Two of her lectures were published in the SISSA Notebooks: Natural law, chance, and order: Arnold Arnold Schoenberg from the laws of harmony to the invention of dodecaphony and Fantastic nets – scientific auras in the music of György Ligeti.

She writes production music for Flippermusic and DENEB Editions. Video artists Ila Bêka and Louise Lemoine have used her music for Spirits (2015), 15 videos available on the website of the Fondazione Prada. Her compositions have been published by Agenda Edizioni and Ars Publica.

== Major works ==
=== Stage and video/film music ===
- La Fleppa lavandara by Anonimo Bolognese (1741) directed by Boris Stetka and Gianfranco De Bosio (1987) Commissioned by Rassegna "Il teatro delle lingue sconfitte", Benevento
- Le baruffe chiozzotte by Carlo Goldoni, directed by Gianfranco De Bosio (1988) Commissione Estate teatrale veronese – Orione Prize Nuove Proposte Musicali Rai Radio 3 1989
- Il cavaliere Giocondo by Carlo Goldoni, directed by Bepi Morassi (1989) Teatro a l'Avogaria of Venice
- George Dandin ou le Mari confondu by Molière in the Italian translation by Cesare Garboli, directed by Carlo Cecchi (1989) Commissioned by Teatro Niccolini (Firenze)
- Echi di Babele after Ruzante and Samuel Beckett, dramaturgy by Giovanni Boni and Boris Stetka, directed by Boris Stetka for Gruppo della Rocca (1989)
- Las Spagnuolas by Andrea Calmo, directed by Lino Spadaro (1990) Teatro a l'Avogaria of Venice
- Lo Schiavetto by Giovan Battista Andreini, directed by Bepi Morassi (1990) Teatro a l'Avogaria of Venice
- I due gemelli veneziani by Carlo Goldoni, directed by Gianfranco De Bosio (1991) Commissioned by Teatro de Gli Incamminati (Milano)
- Il ventaglio by Carlo Goldoni, directed by Andrea Dosio (1991) Teatro a l'Avogaria of Venice
- Insuonio e incantaçion after Ruzante, dramaturgy and direction by Lino Spadaro (1992) Teatro a l'Avogaria of Venice
- La finta ammalata by Carlo Goldoni, directed by Bepi Morassi (1993) Teatro a l'Avogaria of Venice
- Turandot by Carlo Gozzi, directed by Bepi Morassi (1994) Teatro a l'Avogaria of Venice
- La Betìa by Angelo Beolco called Ruzante, direction by Gianfranco De Bosio (1994) Commissioned by Estate teatrale veronese
- Phonés (Voci) after poems by Konstantinos Kavafis, dramaturgy and direction by Stefano Pagin (1995) Teatro a l'Avogaria of Venice
- Le morbinose by Carlo Goldoni, directed by Bepi Morassi (1996) Teatro a l'Avogaria of Venice
- L'alfabeto dei villani dramaturgy by Giovanni Poli after commedia dell'arte plots, directed by Bepi Morassi (1997) Commissioned by Festival d'Autunno of Teatro Olimpico Vicenza
- Il quartiere fortunato (comic interlude for music) by Carlo Goldoni directed by Stefano Pagin (2000) Teatro a l'Avogaria of Venice
- Due Dialoghi:Parlamento and Bilora by Angelo Beolco called Ruzante, directed by Damiano Michieletto (2003) Teatro a l'Avogaria of Venice
- La fiaba della vecchia comare by George Peele, directed by Luca Ferraris (2003) Teatro a l'Avogaria of Venice
- Una ballata del mare salato by Hugo Pratt, directed by Damiano Michieletto (2003) Commissioned by Arteven
- Il Saltuzza by Andrea Calmo, directed by Riccardo Bellandi (2004) Teatro a l'Avogaria of Venice
- I Pitocchi fortunati by Carlo Gozzi, directed by Roberto Milani (2006) Teatro a l'Avogaria of Venice
- La finta ammalata o sia lo speziale by Carlo Goldoni, directed by Bepi Morassi (2006) new version for the 38th Internazional Theatre Festival of Biennale di Venezia
- Il Milione by Marco Polo, complete reading in 4 episodes directed by Gianfranco De Bosio (2006) Commissioned by Comitato Nazionale per le Celebrazioni del 750º anniversario della nascita di Marco Polo
- Eclogues by Virgilio, reading for Festivaletteratura of Mantua, Italian translation by Giorgio Bernardi Perini, directed by Gianfranco De Bosio (2007)
- Il Milione by Marco Polo educational DVD, artistic direction by Gianfranco De Bosio (2008) Commissioned by Teatro Fondamenta Nuove of Venice and Regione Veneto
- Orlando: A Biography after the novel by Virginia Woolf theatrical adaptation and direction by Stefano Pagin (2009) Commissioned by Biennale di Venezia
- La base de tuto by Giacinto Gallina, direction by Stefano Pagin (2009) Commissioned by Teatro Goldoni (Venice)
- Il Cappotto by Nikolai Gogol, theatrical adaptation and direction by Stefano Pagin (2009) Compagnia Teatrale Trepunti
- Il Regno dei Fanes Videomelologue (2010) Text and music by Maria Gabriella Zen, video by Margot Galante Garrone
- Chronos parádoksos full reading of the libretto for the opera by Gianfranco De Bosio and Maria Gabriella Zen, directed by Gianfranco De Bosio with the actors of the School of Piccolo Teatro di Milano (2011) Commissioned by Festival Musica e Poesia d'Europa, Verona
- Orlando-Orlando after the novel by Virginia Woolf, theatrical adaptation for one actor and direction by Stefano Pagin (2011) Premio Teatro OFF Teatro Goldoni (Venice) 2011 e Premio Argot OFF 2012
- Spiriti a video project by Ila Bêka & Louise Lemoine for Fondazione Prada (2015)
- Chronos parádoksos by Gianfranco De Bosio and Maria Gabriella Zen (Premio Matteotti 2012 della Presidency of the Council of Ministers (Italy) Section II – Literary and theatrical works), adaptation and direction di Nicoletta Maragno (2017) Commissioned by Council of Europe Ufficio di Venezia on occasion of Europe Day 2017
- 3'43" (Le Percussioni di Venezia nel Giorno di San Marco 2020) Video by Maria Gabriella Zen (2020)
- Natale digitale 2020: Christmas Tree by Fabrizio Plessi Video by Daniele Frison (2020)
- L'arco immaginifico Video by Tempe Hernandez and Gisella Curtolo (2021)
- Audiolibro Il Milione Artistic direction by Gianfranco De Bosio (2021) available open access in Portale Cultura Veneto (Bacheca/Libri letture of Regione Veneto
- Il mondo di Riccardo. Domenico Riccardo Peretti Griva Magistrato e fotografo movie by Daniele Frison (2022) Preview Torino, Cinema Massimo, 18/1/2022

=== Theatre ===
- L'amore di Don Perlimplino con Belisa nel giardino chamber opera in two acts with an interlude, libretto by Maria Gabriella Zen freely based after the homonym theatrical play by Federico García Lorca (1985–86) Finalist at Internationaler Carl-Maria-von-Weber-Wettbewerb für Kammeropern 1986 of Staatsoper Dresden Semperoper
- En autò ballet music for mezzosoprano, percussions and string quartet (1989) Commissioned by VenetoBalletto, Padova
- Il frutto diviso (Butterfly revisited) musical tragedy in one act, libretto by Boris Stetka (1990)
- Kaleidocromía Performance for walking public. Multimedial path for Percussions, Action Painting and Projectors(1995) Commissioned by Teatro a l'Avogaria of Venice
- Chronos parádoksos opera in two acts (2007–2010) libretto by Gianfranco De Bosio and Maria Gabriella Zen ("Giacomo Matteotti" Prize 2012 of the Presidency of the Council of Ministers (Italy)
- Il Regno dei Fanes Videomelologue for acting voice, soprano, flute/bassflute and 2 percussionists, text by Maria Gabriella Zen after ladin legends and letters from battlefront (1915–1917) by Giuseppe ed Eugenio Garrone, video by Margot Galante Garrone (2010)

=== Compositions for orchestra, choir/orchestra, voice/orchestra, soloists/orchestra ===
- Requiem for soprano, alto, mixed choir and orchestra, Texts after the Book of Job (1990)
- Con lievi mani (eight haiku) for small orchestra (1990)
- Seven Songs for soprano and orchestra on poems by Emily Dickinson (1992)
- Woher und wohin? for soprano, baritone and orchestra, on lines by Simon Frug (1993)
- Vértigo sin fondo, el tiempo... for orchestra (1994)
- Querela pacis for orchestra (1995)
- Woher und wohin? for soprano, alto and orchestra on lines by Simon Frug (1997)
- Ricercare Concert for violin and orchestra (1997)
- Variazioni per archi for string orchestra (1997) Commissioned by "I Virtuosi dell'Ensemble di Venezia"
- Ultime rime d'amore melologue for acting voice and orchestra after Canzoniere per Bartolomeo Zen by Gaspara Stampa (2008) Commissioned by Orchestra i Pomeriggi Musicali
- Variazioni e Corale sulla Follia for string orchestra (2019) Commissioned by ESTA Foundation

=== Chamber music ===
- Tropo di Maggio text by Roberto Mussapi for soprano, flute, trumpet, piano, cello and percussions (1981) Premio "Gigi Ongaro" 1981
- Invenzione a due voci for flute and B clarinet (1983)
- Sette scherzetti for flute and harp (1990)
- No words song for soprano, alto and two chamber groups with percussions (1991)
- Liederkreis for string quartet (1991)
- Trio Gravefoe viola, cello and doublebass (1992)
- Sono lunghe le estati delle Esperidi for flute and percussions (1992) Commissioned by riPERCUSSIONI – II Rassegna
- Woher und wohin? on verses by Simon Frug (with hypothesis of Live electronics) for mezzosoprano, alto flute, clarinet, 2 percussionists (1993) Commissioned by Contempo Ensemble, Venezia
- Cinque Lieder on fragments by Zbigniew Herbert for soprano, grand piano and percussions (1993) Commissioned by Sonopolis-Teatro la Fenice II Edition
- Elegía del recuerdo imposible for Ganassi fluteand marimba (1994) Commissioned by KulturBrauerei, Berlin
- Sacks' pieces for string quartet (1994–95)
- ...leggere la grafia delle nuvole... for piano and percussions (1995) Commissioned by Sonopolis-Teatro La Fenice IV Edition
- Le barricate misteriose (Hommage à Couperin) for 12 cellos (1995) Commissioned by Teodora Campagnaro
- Songes ou rêves? for ensemble with percussions (1995)
- ...troppo pochi luminosi crepuscoli... for flute, harp and cello (1996) Commissioned by Teatro a l'Avogaria of Venice
- Ricercare per violin and piano (1996)
- Vibrante for Ganassi flute (or alto flute or bassflute)and 1 percussionist (1998) Commissioned by Duo Points of contact
- Woher und wohin? on verses by Simon Frug for soprano and string quartet (1998)
- Frattals for string quartet (1998)
- Minus for flute, oboe, clarinet, bassoon and tenor sax (1999) Commissiones by "I Biscromatici", Foligno
- Reflected lights for flute, oboe, clarinet, piano and percussion (1999)
- Dancing around the sun on a poem by Emily Dickinson for mezzosoprano, flute, clarinet, two pianos and percussions (2000) Commissioned by "Donne in Musica" – Section of Venice
- American Songs (3 Love songs): Day after day, Love's Shadows, Thank you for all text by Maria Gabriella Zen for voice and piano (2000)
- ...un cessar dei venti, un letto ed un sonno all'ansia... for string trio (2003) Commissioned by Triodellarco
- In der Wüste texts T. S. Eliot and Book of Isaiah for mezzosoprano, alto and 3 percussionists (2003) Commissioned by MEP Christa Prets organizer of EU Workshop for European artists 2003, Oslip (Austria)
- 11-Eleven (Pax, luminosa Pax) suite by 11 European composers: XI° Fragment-Finale for alto, flute, clarinet, trombone, violin and percussion (2004) Commissioned by MEP Christa Prets on occasion of the enlargement of EU
- Canto ventitreesimo text after 23° Canto dell'Inferno by Dante Alighieri for soprano, alto, fute, clarinet, bass clarinet, tube and 2 percussionists (2004) Commissioned by Festival "Malebolge", Rovigo
- Wie aus der Ferne (Tribute to György Ligeti for string quartet (2005)
- Canzona Magnetica for septet: violin, viola, cello, double bass, b clarinet, bassoon and horn (2006) Commissioned by Nuove Musiche d'Europa – II Edition
- Lacrimosa octet: violin, viola, cello, double bass, clarinet, bassoon, horn and percussions (2006) Commissioned by MEP Christa Prets on occasion of Austria's EU Presidency - 6th International workshop with artists from the EU-25, Bulgaria and Romania
- Variazione su tema di Mozart K 481 for flute, clarinet, violin, cello, piano, vibraphone and tam-tam (2006) Commissioned by Spaziomusica Festival, Cagliari
- Die Linien des Lebens... for octet: violin, viola, cello, double bass, clarinet, bassoon, horn and percussions (2007) Commissioned by Nuove Musiche d'Europa – III Edition
- La cifra del Nulla Happening for 2 pianists on a grand piano and 1 superpercussionist (2007)
- Acedia (Hommage à Schubert) for Piano trio (2008) Commissioned by ORF (Radiotelevisione Austriaca)
- Xenia text by Konstantinos Kavafis for cello ensemble and voice ad libitum (2009) Commissioned by Venice Cello Ensemble
- Canzona a tre (on a theme by Giovanni Gabrieli) for G flute, cello and percussions (2013) Commissioned by Fondazione Teatro La Fenice for "Lo Spirito della Musica di Venezia 2013" Festival
- Tre frammenti da Stabat Mater by Tiziano Scarpa for soprano and vibraphone (2014) Commissioned by Fondazione Teatro La Fenice for "Lo Spirito della Musica di Venezia 2014" Festival
- Adeste Fideles in stille Nacht for two violins (wanderers) (2015) Commissioned by Ex Novo Ensemble
- Nigunìm on Jewish traditional songs for cello ensemble (2016) Commissioned by Venice Cello Ensemble
- Viola che vola I, II, III for viola (and shadow of piano ad libitum) (2018)
- Oriente for ebony flute, bass flute, dobachi, vibraphone and gong (2020) Commissioned by Kublai Film

=== Compositions for percussion ===
- Farewell marimba and player's voice ad libitum (1991) Commissioned by riPERCUSSIONI – II Review
- Invenzione a due for marimba and vibraphone (1992) Commissioned by riPERCUSSIONI – III Review
- Ricercare for dobachi, vibraphone and deep gong (1992) Commissioned by Sonopolis-Teatro La Fenice I Edition
- Risonanze for 2 percussionists (1995)
- Farewell version for vibraphone and player's voice ad libitum (1999) Commissioned by Venezia Nuova Musica
- Motus in fine velociorfor 3 percussionists (2011) Commissioned by Conservatorio Benedetto Marcello of Venezia on occasion of Suona Italiano Festival
- Svariazioni 12 variations on Ah! vous dirai-je, maman for 5 percussionists (2017) Commissioned by Festivalpercussioni 2017
- Omaggio a Varèse for 13 percussionists (2023) Commissioned by Conservatory of Music Benedetto Marcello of Venice on occasion of 60th anniversary of the Percussion School
- Micromusic1 for vibraphone (2024) published on International Music Score Library Project/Petrucci Music Library
- Micromusic2 for vibraphone and pedal drum 29" prepared with 3 heavy bells (11", 9", 7") or 3 little splash cymbals on the membrane (2024) published on International Music Score Library Project/Petrucci Music Library
- Micromusic3 for pedal drum 29", brass Chinese wind chimes or glass wind chimes, medium suspended cymbal, large suspended cymbal, gong, tam-tam (2025)
- Micromusic4 for crotals with doublebass bow, vibraphone with malletts and doublebass bow, marimba, three suspended cymbals, wind brass chimes (2026)
- Micromusic5 for vibraphone, marimba with malletts and two doublebass bows, three woodblocks, ocean drum (wave sea murmuring), three suspended cymbals, large marine shell, two gongs, tam-tam (or water gong) and a container or a bucket) full of water (2026)

=== Solo compositions ===
- Esercizio for piano (1983)
- Frammentazioni for viola (1989)
- Chiarina (Hommage à Schumann) for flute (1991)
- Tre piccoli pezzi for flute (1991)
- Salmi for soprano, text from Psalms (1993) Finalist at Olympia International Composition Competition, Athens 1993
- Cinque studi per chitarra (1992) Commissioned by Sonopolis-Teatro La Fenice I Edition
- Omaggio a Kavafisfor guitar (1995) Commissioned by Sonopolis-Teatro La Fenice IV Edition
- Hommage à Escher for piano (1995)
- Cinque pezzi per organo (1999)
- Teòdoton for double bass (2002)
- Der Schützengel als Begleiter des Menschen Variations on the theme of Passacaglia Sonata XVI by Heinrich Ignaz Franz Biber for solo violin (2004) Commissioned by Fondo Ambiente Italiano Section of Venice.
- Come in uno specchio for piano (2008) Commissioned by Europe Direct – VE.net.O
- Sette fantasie Variations on Così fan tutte by Wolfgang Amadeus Mozart for piano (2008) Commissioned by Donne in Musica-Section of Venice
- O sgouros vasilikòs for piano (2018) Commissioned by Technopolis, Athens
- Viola che vola I, II, III for viola (2018)
- Micromusic1 for vibraphone (2024) published on International Music Score Library Project/Petrucci Music Library

=== Compositions for choir ===
- Sonetto contra la moglie on a poem by Francesco Berni for chorus with four even voice (1979)
- Sette Cori on fragments from Medea by Euripides for mixed chorus (1990)
- Daffodils on a poem by William Wordsworth for female choir or children's choir (1997) Commissioned by "The Madrigal Singers", Manila
- Favoletta, Frutta erbaggi, Guarda là quella vezzosa Three little pieces on poems by Umberto Saba for female choir or children's choir (2001)
- Don Giovanni, variazioni sul mito even variations on Là ci darem la mano, texts by Euripides, Heine, Leopardi and Rainer Maria Rilke for 4 percussionists and organ in a faraway hall (Biennale Musica 2010) Commissioned by Biennale di Venezia
- Magnificat Canticum Beatae Mariae Virginis (Luc. I, 46–55) for 8 female (or children's) voices choir (2011)
- Tre canti natalizi (Adeste fideles, Tu scendi dalle stelle, Stille Nacht) for choir with equal voices and percussion (2012) Commissioned by Teatro La Fenice Foundation

=== Children's compositions ===
- Il paggio saggio Theatrical action on text by Sergio Tofano for narrator, solo white voice, Children's Choir and Youth orchestra (1991)
- Variazioni Curtolo on Happy Birthday to You for 2 violins (or violin e viola), piano, 3 (or more!) young percussionists and family members chorus (2006)
- Favole al telefono (Young Person's Guide to the Percussions) on text by Gianni Rodari for narrator and 4 percussionists (bravi!) (2015) Commissioned by Amici della Musica di Foligno and Tetraktis Percussioni

== Discography ==
- CD Museum of art (Production Music) Primrose Music, London, PRCD 058 (1993)
- CD Venezia Musica Nuova collective CD of 7 Venetian composers (2002)
- CD Workshops 2001/2002/2003 2 collective CDs of European composers attached to the Catalog produced by Ziel1=Kunst=Kunst1 and MEP Christa Prets ISBN 3-901757-37-6 (2004)
- CD 11-Im Gedenken an die Opfer von Terror und Krieg Eröffnungskonzert Sala Rossi im Teatro la Fenice 8.X.2004, collective CD of European composers produced by Ziel1=Kunst=Ziel1 e PSE-Sozialdemokratische Fraktion im Europäischen Parlament ISBN 3-901757-40-6 (2004)
- Educational DVD Il Milione by Marco Polo complete reading, artistic direction by Gianfranco De Bosio, music by Maria Gabriella Zen, produced by Regione Veneto and Teatro Fondamenta Nuove, TFN/0108 (2008)
- CD Medieval Travelers (Production Music) DENEB-DNB764 (2012)
- CD Medieval wedding (Production Music) FlipperMusic Int. Red Globe Records – RGR 164 (2017)
- CD Frammentazioni for viola (1989) Giovanni Petrella, viola Attached to the score published in Contemporanea by Agenda Edizioni, Monte San Pietro (BO), 2019 www.agendaproduzioni.it
- CD Sette scherzetti for flute and harp (1990) Monica Finco, flute, Maria Pia Toso, harp. Attached to the score published by Contemporanea by Agenda Edizioni, Monte San Pietro (BO), 2019 www.agendaproduzioni.it
- Audiobook Il Milione Artistic direction by Gianfranco De Bosio (2021) available open access in Portale Cultura Veneto (Bacheca/Libri letture) of Regione Veneto

== Awards ==
- Visiting Scholar at Kodály Zoltán Magyar Kórusiskola Summer Courses 1979, Esztergom (HU) with scholarship from the Hungaryan Ministry of Culture
- Gigi Ongaro Prize 1981 to Tropo di Maggio, Conservatory of Music, Padua
- Finalist at Internationaler Carl-Maria-von-Weber-Wettbewerb für Kammeropern 1986 Staatsoper Dresden Semperoper with L'amore di Don Perlimplino con Belisa nel giardino
- Orione Prize Rai Radio 3 1989 to incidental music for Le baruffe chiozzotte by Carlo Goldoni for string quartet
- 1989–2006 Resident composer of Teatro a l'Avogaria of Venice
- Finalist at Olympia International Composition Competition 1993 Athens with Salmi
- Delegate from Italy at the 2003 Workshop for European artists, Oslip (Austria) organized by MEP Christa Prets
- Winner with the project Chronos parádoksos of 09/2006 European Competition for Culture Programme 2007–2013 of European Education and Culture Executive Agency (EACEA) of the European Union for a new opera
- Delegate from Italy at the 2006 International Workshop with artists from the EU-25, Bulgaria and Romania (a contribution to Austria's EU Presidency
- Winner of the Competition for a Linguistics PhD 2007/2010, Ca' Foscari University with the project for a new polyglot opera
- Theatre OFF 2011 Prize of Teatro Goldoni (Venice) to Orlando-Orlando
- Giacomo Matteotti Prize of the Presidency of the Council of Ministers (Italy) – VIII Edition 2012 to the libretto of the "european" opera Chronos Paràdoksos written with Gianfranco De Bosio
- Argot OFF Prize 2012 to Orlando-Orlando

== Literary works ==
- Studiare in vacanza: il metodo Kodály in Laboratorio Musica n.14/15 – Luglio-Agosto 1980, pp. 16–18
- Attualità di un metodo didattico del '700: "Corelli trasformato in quattro Antifone e otto Tantum ergo da Antonio Tonelli Carpigiano" in La Cartellina anno decimo n.45 – settembre 1986, Suvini Zerboni, Milano, pp. 20–32
- Citazioni da autori che mi sono particolarmente cari... in Musica Attuale 2/1991, Ed. Musicali AGENDA, Bologna 1991, p. 13
- Alberta Cataldi (a cura di), Autoanalisi dei compositori italiani contemporanei vol.1, Flavio Pagano Editore, Napoli 1992 ISBN 88-85228-16-X, p. 169
- Arnold Schoenberg: dalle leggi dell'armonia all'invenzione della dodecafonia in Quaderni ILAS/LL-10/1994, SISSA (Scuola Internazionale Superiore di Studi Avanzati), Trieste 1994, pp. 13–30
- Reti fantastiche – Aure scientifiche nella musica di György Ligeti in Quaderni ILAS/LL-6/1995, SISSA (Scuola Internazionale Superiore di Studi Avanzati), Trieste 1995, pp. 1–29
- Chronos parádoksos: genesi di un'opera poliglotta in DSpace Home – Ca' Foscari Editore Ca' Foscari University of Venice Venezia 2012
- Don Bruno Bertoli e la musica in Appunti di Teologia Notiziario trimestrale del Centro di studi teologici Germano Pattaro di Venezia – Anno XXIX – n.4, Ottobre-Dicembre 2016, p. 6
- Preface to the book Fior da fiore: Sicilia, la mia terra by Maurizio Karra, Fotograf Editore, Palermo 2022 ISBN 978-88-97988-61-8

=== Bibliography ===
- Carlo Saletti, Le voci dal mare (lessico delle "Baruffe"): Musica per la scena, in Quaderni di VENETOTeatro, Volume n. 14, Edizioni di VENETOTeatro, settembre 1988, p. 44
- Ute Büchter-Römer, Kompositionen für Stimme zeitgenössischer italienischer Komponistinnen in Viva Voce N° 66, Winter 2003 (Frau und Musik – Internationaler Arbeitskreis e.V., Frankfurt a.M.), pp. 5–6
- Marco Munari (edited by), LA BELLA SCOLA L' Inferno letto dai poeti canti XVIII-XXX Malebolge I° edition: Rovigo settembre 2004 ISBN 88-901315-4-3, p. 66 e pp. 145–149
- Andrea Dicht, in AA.VV. 64ª Stagione Sinfonica Orchestra I Pomeriggi Musicali Milano 2008
- Alessandro Vincenzi e Anja Rudak, Giornale di bordo: Studio su Orlando in Mediterraneo – Catalogo del 40º Festival Internazionale del Teatro della Biennale di Venezia, Marsilio Editori, Venezia 2009, pp. 80–83
- Meri Lao, Dizionario maniacale del sette, DigiSet, Roma 2013, ISBN 978-88-909048-0-6, p. 81 e pp. 298–299
- Licia Mari, Ruzante e la musica in Sito regionale su Ruzante ruzante – Sito regionale su Ruzante p. 2 (La musica nelle messinscene del novecento)
- Renzo Cresti, Musica presente: tendenze e compositori di oggi, Libreria Musicale Italiana, Lucca 2019-2021, ISBN 978-88-554300-1-2, p. 306
