= Art, Design and Architecture Museum =

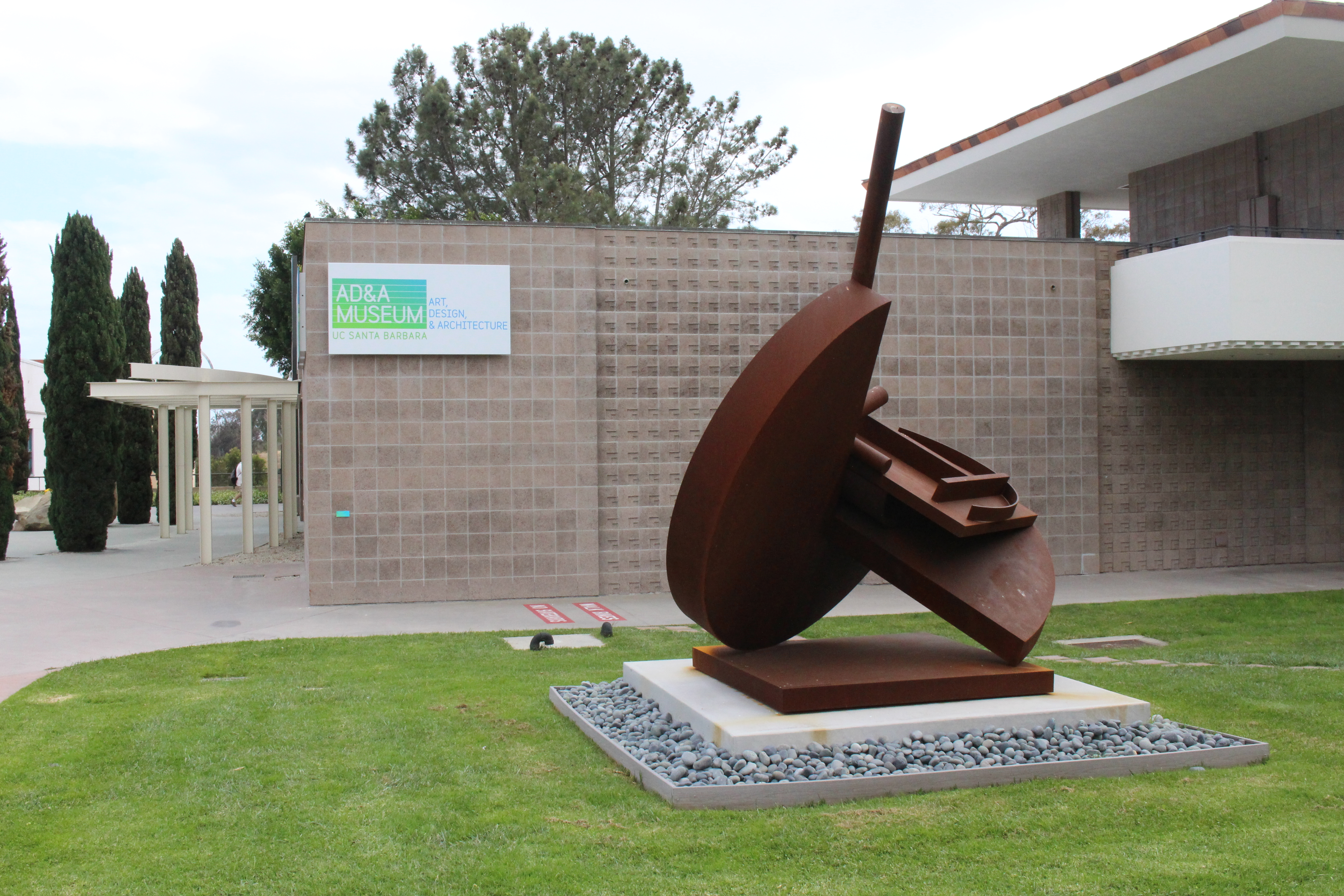
- Art, Design, & Architecture Museum at UCSB
- Established: 1959
- Location: University of California, Santa Barbara, Santa Barbara, California
- Coordinates: 34.4120°N 119.8488°W
- Type: Art, design, architecture museum
- Website: museum.ucsb.edu

The Art, Design and Architecture Museum (branded as AD&A Museum) is a museum within the University of California, Santa Barbara, located in Santa Barbara County, California, United States.

Built in 1959, the facility was originally a gallery for art education at the university. Faculty member and architectural historian David Gebhard served as its director for twenty years. It was formally accredited by the American Alliance of Museums in 1977. Today the AD&A contains a fine art collection of over 8,500 original works.

Reflecting its name, the museum often highlights the intersections between art, design, and architecture.

== Collection ==
Other than the original works, the AD&A also possesses over two million architectural drawings, historic photographs, writings, scrapbooks, and three-dimensional objects in the Architecture and Design Collection. From its inception, the museum was one of few institutions collecting architectural design materials, and today holds significant collections that include the papers of Rudolph Schindler, Irving Gill, Lutah Maria Riggs, Steven Erlich, Barton Myers, and George Washington Smith. Today, the museum states that it is "one of the largest architectural archives in North America."

The museum's digital collections were enhanced with online exhibitions during the COVID-19 crisis so that audiences could continue to enjoy its resources during the health quarantine.

== Artists and Exhibitions ==
=== Early Exhibitions ===
In 1959, the museum's inaugural exhibition featured the German painter and sculptor Max Beckmann. Beckmann was a longtime friend with his main patron, the German-American collector and writer Stephan Lackner. Lackner had moved to Santa Barbara in the early 1940s and began facilitating exhibitions based on his collection of Beckmann's works as early as 1955, including at the Santa Barbara Museum of Art.

=== 1960s Exhibitions ===
A majority of the exhibitions in the 1960s featured painting work, including from painter-sculptor Rico LeBrun, Howard Warshaw, and William Merritt Chase. Josef Albers painted but also worked with glass and furniture design. The exhibition of work by Kem Weber represents the major architectural offering to audiences during this decade.

=== 1970s Exhibitions ===
- Charles Demuth: A Retrospective
- Los Angeles in the 1930s
- Robert Rauschenberg
- Robert Smithson

=== 1980s Exhibitions ===
The AD&A featured several notable painters in the 1980s, including Reginald Marsh, Alex Katz, and a combined exhibition with Lorser Feitelson and Helen Lundeberg. The exhibition schedule also highlighted the museum's broader identity by showing work from architect R.M. Schindler, ancient three-dimensional metalwork in the form of Etruscan Bronzes, and the street photography of Gary Winogrand.

=== 1990s Exhibitions ===
The exhibitions of the 1990s reflects attention to this era's focus on multiculturalism. It featured works that addressed issues of race in the work of Glenn Ligon, and gender and sexuality from Kiki Smith. The museum highlighted its first artist from Asia, showing pop culture sculpture work from Kenji Yanobe. The AD&A also hosted examples of storytelling quilt work from activist-artist Faith Ringgold. Another exhibition continued the threads of design and architecture with a showing of materials from Michael Graves.

=== 2000s Exhibitions ===
The museum's exhibitions during the 2000s strayed from single artist features and focused on themes and concepts. Outside of the exhibition of designer Paul Tuttle, the most significant showings offered titles such as Contemporary Art from Cuba, Buddhist Perspectives in Contemporary Art, Qing Dynasty Couplets from the Lechangzai Xuan Collection, and New London Architecture (titled "Gritty Brits").

=== 2010s Exhibitions ===
In the 2010s the museum presented a diversified set of core exhibitions. Fine arts shows included painters such as contemporary American painter and illustrator Amy Cutler (Jul 14-Sep 16, 2012), the Spanish romantic painter and printmaker Francisco Goya (Sep 13-Dec 22, 2013), Japanese American painter and teacher Chiura Obata (Jan 13-Apr 29, 2018), American oil painter John Sonsini (Jan 12-Apr 28, 2019), and American painter, curator, and art teacher Lee Mullican (Jul 13-Sep 1, 2019). Sculpture by Alice Aycock.

Architecture-related exhibitions featured work from J.R. Davidson (Sep 28-Dec 8, 2019), Irving J Gill, Cliff May (in the show Pacific Standard Time: Art in LA, 1945–1980), and American architectural photographer Julius Shulman (Jan 12-Apr 28, 2019).

Film and photography found its first presence in the museum during this decade, as it hosted exhibitions on American visual artist, photographer, and filmmaker Andy Warhol (Feb 16-May 12, 2013), American film industry makeup artist Michael Westmore (Jan 14-April 30, 2017), Iranian American photographer Firooz Zahedi (Jul 14-Sep 2, 2018), American filmmaker Ja’Tovia Gary (Jul 14-Sep 2, 2018), contemporary Italian artist, filmmaker and producer Ila Bêka (Sep 28-Dec 8, 2019), and French video artist and filmmaker Louise Lemoine (Sep 28-Dec 8, 2019).

A set of unique offerings included work from Swiss psychologist Carl Jung (Jan 12-Apr 28, 2019) as well as a combined exhibition on dancers Anna Halprin, Simone Forti, and Yvonne Rainer.

=== 2020s Exhibitions ===
Recent exhibitions have leaned toward more culturally involved artists, seen in several exhibitions engaged in strong social commentaries or critiques. Work from Japanese visual artist and writer Tomiyama Taeko (Jan 18-Apr 28, 2025) explicitly interrogates the impacts of colonialism and imperialism. The American interdisciplinary artist Sandy Rodriguez (Feb 25, 2023 Mar 3, 2024) tackles violence and uprisings in Central California history, while Cuban-Jamaican-Jewish American painter Harmonia Rosales (Jan 19-May 1, 2022) places classic European art into visual conversation with African diasporic experiences. Vietnamese American contemporary cartography and installation artist Tiffany Chung (Jan 17-Apr 26, 2026) explores modes of generating more intimacy and memory around those forced into exile or refugee status across the globe.

- Ishi Glinksy - Tohono O’odham and German artist of Indigenous craft and contemporary art (Sep 1, 2022-Jan 22, 2023)
- Keith Puccinelli - American artist of drawing, sculpture, and interactive installation (Sep 7-Dec 16, 2024)
- Jackie Amézquita - Guatemalan American performance artist (Aug 26-Nov 29, 2026)
- Bonnie Ora Sherk - American landscape-space, performance artist, and educator (Aug 26-Nov 29, 2026)
- Ben Sakoguchi (Jan 16-May 2, 2027) - Japanese American painter and multimedia artist, in collaboration with the Japanese American National Museum in Los Angeles.

== See also ==
- List of design museums
