= Sandy Rodriguez =

American artist born 1975

- Born: 1975 (age 50–51); National City, California, U.S.
- Education: California Institute of the Arts (B.F.A.)
- Website: studiosandyrodriguez.com

Sandy Rodriguez (born 1975 in National City, California) is an American interdisciplinary artist based in Los Angeles.

== Early life and personal information ==
Rodriguez is of Mexican descent and grew up in the San Diego region, on the California-Mexico border. She attended the Los Angeles County High School for the Arts from age 16. Rodriguez earned her Bachelor in Fine Arts from the California Institute of Arts.

== Career ==
Prior to becoming a full-time artist, Rodriguez worked in museums. She worked at the J. Paul Getty Museum in Los Angeles for over a decade. As part of her museum work, she taught studio courses.

In 2014, on a visit to the southern Mexican state of Oaxaca, Rodriguez first procured cochineal, a red pigment produced in the pre-Columbian era. Prior to this, Rodriguez had painted exclusively in modern paint. The encounter with cochineal happened while she was painting fire paintings, and during protests began in Ayotzinapa in response to forty-three missing college students.

Rodriguez primarily focused on landscape paintings prior to 2017.

In April 2022, Rodriguez participated in a three-week residency at Cornell University as part of the interdisciplinary project "From Invasive Others toward Embracing Each Other: Migration, Dispossession, and Place-Based Knowledge in the Arts of the Americas." This project aimed to examine Latinx, Indigenous, and Chicanx histories through visual and performance arts.

During her residency, Rodriguez led workshops, focusing on themes of nature, activism, and traditional bioregional art practices. These workshops allowed participants to engage with indigenous pigments and their historical significance. On April 28, 2022, Rodriguez delivered a keynote presentation at Cornell, discussing her artistic practice and the research underpinning her work with indigenous pigments.

=== Process ===
Having previously worked with oil paints, by 2025 Rodriguez primarily has used watercolor paints made from natural pigments on amate, a paper made from bark. Rodriguez sources her amate from Otomi artisans, who primarily use jonote and agave fibers. Because amate does not allow for the blending or erasure of pigments, Rodriguez plans her works digitally before executing them.

== Museum exhibitions ==
=== Solo exhibitions ===
- Borderlands, Huntington Library, San Marino, California
- Sandy Rodriguez in Isolation (2021-2022), Amon Carter Museum of American Art, Fort Worth, Texas
- Sandy Rodriguez: Unfolding Histories: 200 Years of Resistance (2023-2024), Art, Design and Architecture Museum, Santa Barbara
- Currents of Resistance (2025), Ringling Museum of Art, Sarasota, Florida
- Book 13 (2026), Huntington Library, San Marino, California
- Sandy Rodriguez: Tierra Insurgente (2026), Hispanic Society Museum and Library, New York City

=== Group exhibitions ===
- Mixpantli: Contemporary Echoes (2021-2022), Los Angeles County Museum of Art
- Busan Bienniale (2022), Museum of Contemporary Art Busan, South Korea
- Contemporary Ex-Votos: Devotion Beyond Medium (2022), New Mexico State University, Las Cruces
- Traitor, Survivor, Icon: The Legacy of La Malinche (2022), Denver Art Museum, Denver
- Past/Present/Future: Expanding Indigenous American, Latinx, Hispanic American, Asian American, and Pacific Islander Perspectives in Thomas J. Watson Library (2022-2023), The Met Fifth Avenue, New York City
- Prospect 2024 (2024), Museum of Contemporary Art San Diego

== Collections ==
Her works are held in the permanent collection of the Amon Carter Museum of American Art and at the Museum of Contemporary Art San Diego.
