= Anconitana (Ruzante) =

Play written by Angelo Beolco

- Author: Ruzante
- Language: Tuscan
- Genre: Comedy
- Publication place: Italy

L'Anconitana is a comedy by playwright Angelo Beolco also known as Ruzante. It is in many ways considered a prelude to the Commedia dell'arte. The dating is uncertain as well as one of the major philological issues today.

== Characters ==
- Tancredi
- Teodoro
- Gismondo, a false identity under which Isotta really lies
- Doralice, courtesan
- Sier Tomao, brother
- Ruffian, Tomao's fame
- Bessa, dean of Doralice
- Geneva, anconitana
- Ghitta, a Geneva woman
- Menato, peasant
