= Bêka & Lemoine =

Filmmaker duo

Bêka & Lemoine (Ila Bêka and Louise Lemoine) are artists, filmmakers and researchers working at the crossroads of visual arts, non-fiction cinema and architecture. Working together since 2005 they have been experimenting with new narrative and cinematic forms to explore how people experience, perceive, and relate to space from an emotional, social, and cultural standpoint. The duo has been described by the Barbican Center as one of the most important architectural artists working today. In 2016, MoMA, Museum of Modern Art in New York, acquired their entire body of work—16 films at the time—which now forms part of its permanent collection. The acquisition of an artist's complete body of work by the Museum of Modern Art (MoMA) is an exceptionally rare honor for a living artist.

== Biography ==
Ila Bêka is a trained architect, graduated from the Università Iuav di Venezia and the École Nationale Supérieure d'Architecture de Paris-Belleville. During his studies, he was mentored by prominent figures such as Aldo Rossi, Manfredo Tafuri, Vittorio Gregotti, Massimo Cacciari, Bernardo Secchi, Ugo La Pietra, Henri Ciriani, and Jacques Lucan. Since 2000, he has directed and produced films and video installations, which have been recognized and awarded at numerous prestigious festivals. His film In Utero was awarded at the Arcipelago Festival (Jameson Award, 2002) and shortlisted for Best Short Film for the Academy Awards (2003). I Have Seen my Mother Dancing in the Clouds has been awarded at Torino Film Festival (Best International Short Film, 2003), while Ventre was awarded at Interfilm Berlin Film Festival (Best Film Award, 2005) and received a Special Mention at Nastri d'Argento (2005). Ila Bêka also won the Premio Troisi for Best Film at MareFestival (2004) for his short film Buongiorno, one of the most awarded short film in history with more than 60 awards and 250 official selections at the most important international short film festivals.

Louise Lemoine studied Art History and Cinema History at the Sorbonne University (Paris 1 and Paris 4), earning a DEA degree under the guidance of Nicole Brenez with a thesis titled “L’esthétique du fragment ou la pensée du doute” (“The Aesthetics of Fragmentation or the Philosophy of Doubt”).

In 2005, they co-founded the independent film company Bêka & Partners. Their first collaborative feature, Koolhaas Houselife, released in 2008, follows housekeeper Guadalupe Acedo as she performs her daily tasks within Rem Koolhaas's iconic "Maison à Bordeaux". The film received widespread critical acclaim, achieving "cult status" for its unique portrayal of the house not as a static masterpiece but as a living, imperfect structure. By revealing its challenges — leaks, maintenance, and practical shortcomings — the film has gone “far beyond simple architecture… it has the wit and the style to work as an arthouse cinema release”.

Koolhaas Houselife became the inaugural installment of the Living Architectures series, which includes five films by Bêka & Lemoine: Koolhaas Houselife, the Inside Piano trilogy, Pomerol, Herzog & de Meuron, Xmas Meier, and Gehry’s Vertigo. Their filmography later expanded to examine more complex residential environments, including Auguste Perret’s Rue Franklin Apartments (25 Bis), the Barbican Estate (Barbicania), and Bjarke Ingels Group's 8 House (The Infinite Happiness). They also explored urban public spaces in films like 24 heures sur place—a reflection on Place de la République in Paris — and Voyage autour de la Lune. Further investigations into personal and domestic spaces led to works like Selling Dreams, Moriyama-San, and Butohouse. With the trilogy of films Tokyo Ride, Big Ears Listen with Feet, and The Sense of Tuning, they captured the essence of Tokyo, Bangkok, and Mumbai through the intimate and personal perspectives of architects who live and work in these cities: Ryue Nishizawa, Boonserm Premthada, and Bijoy Jain. One of their last films, Rehab (from rehab), was filmed in the REHAB clinic in Basel, designed by Swiss architects Herzog & de Meuron. The film is a sensitive and personal reflection that questions the way hospitals think spaces of care for the most vulnerable ones.

Hailed by The New York Times as "cult figures in the European architecture world", Bêka & Lemoine's work "imaginatively, and often hilariously, explores the daily life of contemporary architecture as it is inhabited and experienced".

== Influence ==
Bêka & Lemoine have significantly influenced both architecture and cinema, redefining how we perceive space, in architecture, cities, and the built environment as a whole. Their work shifts the focus from traditional, object-oriented representations of architecture to the human experiences that unfold within designed environments. By capturing the everyday interactions, emotions, and social dynamics that occur within buildings, they explore how spaces shape, and are shaped by, human life. This approach has changed how we understand the impact of design on daily experiences, highlighting the intimate relationship between people and the spaces they inhabit.

Their contributions extend beyond architecture into the field of cinema, where they have pioneered a new genre of filmmaking. By blending documentary and narrative techniques, Bêka & Lemoine have created a unique cinematic style that emphasizes the lived experience of architecture, making it more relatable and accessible. Their films challenge conventional approaches to architectural representation, offering a more inclusive, human-centered perspective. This shift has not only enriched architectural discourse but also expanded the role of cinema in documenting and interpreting the built environment. Through their work, they have contributed to a broader understanding of how film can be used to explore the intersection of space, society, and human experience, offering new insights for both architecture and cinema.

== Critical Engagement ==
Bêka & Lemoine’s work has been widely noted for its critical engagement with architecture as a subtle instrument of social control. Drawing on theoretical perspectives from Michel Foucault, Henri Lefebvre, and Beatriz Colomina, their films investigate how built environments structure behavior, shape routines, and influence social dynamics. Through observational and often humorous portrayals in films such as Koolhaas Houselife, The Infinite Happiness, Barbicania and the Homo Urbanus series, they reveal how people adapt to, resist, or reinterpret architectural intentions. Their cinematic approach foregrounds the frictions between design and daily life, emphasizing how architecture governs not only movement and visibility, but also emotion, labor, and social interaction.

== Perfect Days and Moriyama-San ==
The 2023 film Perfect Days by Wim Wenders has drawn significant attention for its striking similarities to the 2017 documentary Moriyama-San by Bêka & Lemoine, sparking discussions about the extent of these resemblances. Luca Galofaro, writing for ArchDaily, highlighted the uncanny alignment between the two films, particularly in their portrayal of solitary protagonists—Hirayama in Perfect Days and Moriyama in Moriyama-San. Both characters are depicted as introspective individuals navigating their urban environments through meditative routines, such as observing the world through windows, lying on the floor to read, and performing repetitive, almost ritualistic actions that emphasize their deep connection with their architectural surroundings.

The visual language of the two films amplifies these parallels, with stills from Perfect Days and Moriyama-San revealing an extraordinary resemblance in composition, mood, and the protagonists' gestures. The degree of similarity in these visuals has led to questions about the originality of Perfect Days, given that Moriyama-San predates it by six years. Jack Murphy, in The Architect’s Newspaper, further underscored how Perfect Days seems to echo the contemplative atmosphere and thematic focus of Moriyama-San. He noted how both films delve into the rhythms of daily life and the intimate relationship between human identity and architectural space, but the parallels in execution and aesthetic between the two are difficult to overlook. These similarities blur the lines between inspiration and coincidence, creating a compelling yet controversial dialogue about the artistic interplay between the two films.

== Festivals and Screenings ==
Bêka & Lemoine’s work has been featured at numerous prominent international film festivals, including CPH:DOX (Copenhagen, Denmark), Ji.hlava International Documentary Film Festival (Ji.hlava, Czech Republic), Dok Leipzig (Leipzig, Germany), Docaviv International Documentary Film Festival (Tel Aviv, Israel), Chicago International Film Festival (Chicago, Illinois), BAFICI - Buenos Aires International Festival of Independent Cinema (Buenos Aires, Argentina), BIFF – Bergen International Film Festival (Bergen, Norway), Yalta International Film Festival (Jalta), Le FIFA - Festival International du Film sur l'Art (Montréal, Canada), CAFx – Copenhagen Architecture Forum (Copenhagen, Denmark), AFFR - Architecture Film Festival (Rotterdam, Netherlands), MDFF - Milano Design Film Festival (Milano, Italy), SMAFF – St. Moritz Art Film Festival (St. Moritz, Switzerland), SIAFF – Seoul International Architecture Film Festival (Seoul, Korea), London Architecture Film Festival (London, UK), ADFF - Architecture & Design Film Festival (USA), Archfilmlund (Sweden), Brussels Art Film Festival (Brussels, Belgium).

Among the cultural institutions that presented their work: MAXXI - National Museum of 21st Century Arts (Rome, Italy), The Royal Academy of Arts (London, UK), Barbican Center (London, UK), Bozar - Centre for Fine Arts (Brussels, Belgium), Louisiana Museum of Modern Art (Copenhagen, Denmark), Minsheng Art Museum (Shanghai, China), MOMAK - National Museum of Modern Art (Kyoto, Japan), MET – The Metropolitan Museum of Art (New York, USA), Palais de Tokyo (Paris, France), Stedelijk Museum (Amsterdam, Netherlands), NAI - Netherlands Architecture Institute (Rotterdam, Netherlands), CCA - Canadian Centre for Architecture (Montreal, Canada), Fondazione La Biennale di Venezia (Venice, Italy).

== Filmography ==
- Mundo Frágil , 2026
- The world in a Square, 2026
- Vija, 2025
- Esperando Soy, 2025
- Transmutation, 2025
- Spatial Disobedience, 2025
- Softly Brutal, 2024
- The Sense of Tuning, 2023
- Rehab From Rehab, 2023
- Big Ears Listen With Feet, 2022
- Oslavia, The Cave of the Past Future, 2021
- Tokyo Ride, 2020
- ButoHouse, 2019
- Homo Urbanus (2017 - ongoing project of 14 films)
- Moriyama-San, 2017
- Selling Dreams, 2016
- Voyage autour de la Lune, 2015
- Spiriti, 2015
- The Infinite Happiness, 2015
- Barbicania, 2014
- 24 heures sur place, 2014
- La Maddalena, 2014
- L’Expérience du vide, 2014
- 25 bis, 2014
- Living Architectures, 2013
- Pomerol, Herzog & de Meuron, 2011
- Xmas Meier, 2010
- Gehry’s Vertigo, 2010
- Inside Piano (3 films), 2010
- The Little Beaubourg, 2010
- The Submarine, 2010
- The Power of Silence, 2010
- Koolhaas Houselife, 2008

== Exhibitions ==
=== Homo Urbanus. A City-matographic Odyssey ===
Since 2019, Bêka & Lemoine have broadened their cinematic perspective, by expanding their focus from architecture and buildings — which inherently pose questions about authorship — to the city, public, and shared spaces. As the artists states, these spaces are “an open, collective, and anonymous work, made up of historical layers without a single author’s signature, allowing for new and more complex explorations that open up an anthropological viewpoint”. The films in this series, shot in Bangkok, Bogotá, Doha, Kyoto, La Habana, Lisbon, Mumbai, Naples, Rabat, Saint Petersburg, Seoul, Shanghai, Tokyo and Venice, aim to capture the essence of urban life as closely as possible to a physical experience, presenting real-life scenes observed at close range. For this reason, the ongoing film project is presented in exhibitions designed by the filmmakers themselves, with large screens set at ground level and carefully crafted soundscapes, creating a portable urban stage. The project has been showcased in solo exhibitions at the following institutions: Museum of Contemporary Art – MAC/CCB (Lisbon, Portugal), S AM (Basel, Switzerland), Jim Thompson Art Center (Bangkok, Thailand), Fundació Enric Miralles and Loop Festival (Barcelona, Spain), Arc en Rêve - Centre d’architecture (Bordeaux, France), CAMP - Center for Architecture and Urbanism (Prague, Czech Republic).

=== Spaccasassi ===
In 2023, Beka&Lemoine conceived the installation Spaccasassi, commissioned by MAXXI - National Museum of 21st Century Arts for the exhibition "BioGrounds: For a new environmental awareness" (Venice, Certosa Island). For this occasion, they paid homage to the 'Spaccasassi', a tree that stands in the middle of the cloister of the ancient Certosa monastery. Together with botanist Stefano Mancuso, they curated a series of performances to pay tribute to this "stonebreaker", inviting the public to sit, watch and listen to this symbol of endurance.

=== Living Architectures ===
The Living Architectures series, focused on the dialogue between architecture and its users, has been showcased in several exhibitions in cultural institutions, as: Oslo Architecture Triennal (Oslo, Norway), Storefront for Art and Architecture (New York, USA), The Architecture Centre (Bristol, UK), The Architecture Foundation (London, UK) and GAMUD, Galleria d'Arte Moderna di Udine (Udine, Italy).

==== Solo Exhibitions ====
- 2026: Fotoni, by Ila Bêka, Magazzino delle Idee (Trieste, Italy)
- 2024: Museum of Contemporary Art – MAC/CCB, Homo Urbanus: A Citymatographic Odyssey (Lisbon, Portugal)
- 2024: Bozar Centre for Fine Arts, Rotor. Entangled Matter (Bruxelles, Belgium)
- 2024: INSTITUTO, Learning to Unlearn (Porto, Portugal)
- 2023: Jim Thompson Art Center, Homo Urbanus: A Citymatographic Odyssey (Bangkok, Thailand)
- 2023: S AM, Homo Urbanus: A Citymatographic Odyssey (Basel, Switzerland)
- 2022: Festival en Ville, Homo Urbanus: A Citymatographic Odyssey (Brussels, Belgium)
- 2021: Fundació Enric Miralles & Loop Festival, Homo Urbanus: A Citymatographic Odyssey (Barcelona, Spain)
- 2021: HDA, Haus der Architektur, Homo Urbanus: A Citymatographic Odyssey (Graz, Austria)
- 2021: Instituto de Arquitectura de Euskadi, Homo Urbanus, (San Sebastián, Spain)
- 2020: Festival Image de Ville, Homo Urbanus 10 Films, 10 Villes du Monde, curated by Luc Joulé (Marseille, France)
- 2018: CAMP - Center for Architecture and Urbanism, Homo Urbanus (Prague, Czech Republic)
- 2010: Oslo Architecture Triennal and ROM Gallery, Living Architectures, curated by Henrik der Minassian (Oslo, Norway)
- 2010: Storefront for Art and Architecture, Living Architectures, curated by Joseph Grima, (New York, USA)
- 2010: The Architecture Centre, Living Architectures (Bristol, UK)
- 2010: The Architecture Foundation, Living Architectures (London, UK)
- 2010: GAMUD, Galleria d'Arte Moderna di Udine, Living Architectures: A Video Trip Through Architecture (Udine, Italy)

==== Collective Exhibitions ====
- 2024: MAXXI Museum, Architettura instabile, curated by Diller Scofidio + Renfro (Rome, Italy)
- 2023: Royal Academy of Arts, Herzog and De Meuron, curated by Vicky Richardson (London, UK)
- 2023: MAXXI Museum, Biogrounds: For a New Environmental Awareness, curated by Domitilla Dardi (Certosa Island, Venice, Italy)
- 2023: MAXXI Museum, Fuori Tutto (Rome, Italy)
- 2022: S AM, Napoli Supermodern (Basel, Switzerland)
- 2022: IABR International Architecture Biennale Rotterdam (Rotterdam, The Netherlands)
- 2021: MAXXI Museum, Casa Balla: From Home to the Universe and Back (Rome, Italy).
- 2020: Berlin-Tempelhof Airport, Living the City, curated by Tatjana Schneider and Lukas Feireiss (Berlin, Germany)
- 2019: XII Architecture Biennial of Sao Paulo, Todo dia/Everyday, curated by Vanessa Grossman, Charlotte Malterre-Barthes and Ciro Miguel, Sesc 24 de Maio (Sao Paulo, Brazil)
- 2019: American Academy, Cinque Mostre, curated by Ilaria Gianni (Rome, Italy)
- 2019: Bi-City Shenzhen Biennale of Urbanism / Architecture, Urban Interactions (Shenzhen, China)
- 2019: Biennale d’Art Contemporain de Rabat, Un instant avant le monde, curated by Abdelkader Damani (Rabat, Marocco)
- 2019: Biennale d’Architecture d’Orléans, Nos années de solitude, curated by Abdelkader Damani & Luca Galofaro (Orléans, France)
- 2018: Design Museum, Home Futures, curated by Eszter Steierhoffer (London, UK)
- 2018: FIAC, Cinéphémère, curated by FILAF (Paris, France)
- 2018: Manege Central Exhibition Hall (Saint Petersburg, Russia)
- 2018: Seoul Biennale of Architecture and Urbanism, Imminent commons, curated by Hyungmin Pai & Alejandro Zaera-Polo (Seoul, South Korea)
- 2018: Victoria & Albert Museum, Without Walls: Disability and Innovation in Building Design (London, UK)
- 2016: Barbican Art Gallery, The Japanese House: Architecture and Life after 1945, curated by Jane Alison & Florence Ostende (London, UK)
- 2016: Oslo Architecture Triennal, After Belonging (Oslo, Norway)
- 2014: 14th Venice International Architecture Biennale, Monditalia, curated by OMA/Rem Koolhaas (Venice, Italy)
- 2014: National Building Museum, HOT TO COLD, curated by Bjarke Ingels Group (Washington, USA)
- 2012: The Pavillion, Beijing Posthastism, curated by Shumon Basar, Joseph Grima, Hans Ulrich Obrist (Beijing, China)
- 2011: Louisiana Museum of Modern Art, Living. Frontiers of architecture (Copenaghen, Denmark)
- 2011: MoMA San Francisco, How Wine Became Modern: Design And Wine 1976 To Now, co-curated by Diller Scofidio + Renfro (San Francisco, USA)
- 2010: 12th Venice International Architecture Biennale, People Meet in Architecture, curated by Kazuyo Sejima (Venice, Italy)
- 2010: 12th Buenos Aires International Biennial of Architecture, Centro Cultural Recoleta (Buenos Aires, Argentina)
- 2008: 11th Venice International Architecture Biennale, Out There: Architecture Beyond Building, curated by Aaron Betsky (Venice, Italy)
- 2008: Istanbul Biennial, curated by Pera Muzesi (Instanbul, Turkey)

== Awards and Public Recognition ==
Bêka & Lemoine have received several awards and honors, marking their influence on contemporary architecture and film:

- 2026: Awarded: Premio internazionale “Bruno Zevi”, In/Arch 2026
- 2026: Ila Bêka: Chevalier de l’Ordre des Arts et des Lettres, French Ministry of Culture
- 2024: Venice Architecture Film Festival, Jury Prize for The Sense of Tuning, Best Prize for Rehab (from rehab).
- 2022: Milano Design Film Festival, Special Mention for Big Ears Listen With Feet
- 2020: DOCAVIV Film Festival, Artistic Vision Award for Tokyo Ride
- 2020: Milano Design Film Festival, Best Prize for Tokyo Ride
- 2020: Prix d'honneur at FILAF, France
- 2019: London Architecture Film Festival, Best Prize for Moriyama San
- 2018: FILAF D’OR, Best Prize for Moriyama San
- 2018: Arquiteturas Film Festival, Best Prize for Moriyama San
- 2018: Archfilmfest, Best Prize for Moriyama San
- 2018: FIFAAC, Bègles, Best Prize for Moriyama San
- 2018: Rome Prize Italian Fellow at the American Academy in Rome (Ila Bêka).
- 2018: Artist in residence at Villa Kujoyama in Kyoto, Institut Français du Japon
- 2016: Art Doc Festival Rome, Best Prize for 25 Bis
- 2017: Featured in *Icon Design* as one of the 100 most talented figures globally
- 2015: Named "Game Changers" by *Metropolis Magazine*
- 2015: Festival Filmes sobra Arte, best Prize for La Maddalena
- 2014: Torino Film Festival, Best Prize for Italian Docs for 24 heures sur place
- 2014: Venice Architecture Biennale, Official Selection for La Maddalena
- 2013: ArchFilmLund, Best Prize for Pomerol, Herzog & de Meuron, Xmas Meier, Gehry’s Vertigo, Inside Piano
- 2008: Venice Architecture Biennale, Official Selection for Koolhaas Houselife

== Collections ==
- MoMA - Museum of Modern Art (New York, USA): Koolhaas Houselife, Inside Piano (The Power of Silence, The Submarine, The Little Beaubourg), 25 Bis, Gehry’s Vertigo, Pomerol, Herzog & de Meuron, Xmas Meier, 24 Heures sur Place, Barbicania, L’Experience du vide, La Maddalena, La Maddalena Chair, Spiriti, The Infinite Happiness, Voyage autour de la Lune
- CCB, Belém Cultural Center (Lisbon, Portugal): Homo Urbanus Lisboetus
- MAXXI, The National Museum of 21st Century of Arts (Rome, Italy): Spaccasassi, Oslavia, The Cave of the Past Future
- FRAC Centre (Orléans, France): ButoHouse, Moriyama-San, The Infinite Happiness, Gehry’s Vertigo, Selling Dreams
- Fondazione Prada (Milan, Italy): Spiriti
- CNAP, Centre National des Arts Plastiques (Paris, France): La Maddalena, La Maddalena Chair, Koolhaas Houselife
- Barbican Art Gallery (London, UK): Barbicania

== Published Books and Dvd-Books ==
- The Emotional Power of Space, Book, published by Bêka & Partners, 2023
- Spaccasassi, Artist Book (limited edition 500 copies), published by Maxxi Museum, Rome, 2023
- Living Architectures, Book + 3 DVD, published by Bêka & Partners 2013
- Inside Piano, Book + DVD, published by Bêka & Partners, 2013
- Gehry's Vertigo, Book + DVD, published by Bêka & Partners, 2013
- Xmas Meier, Book + DVD, published by Bêka & Partners, 2013
- Pomerol, Herzog & de Meuron, Book + DVD, published by Bêka & Partners, 2013
- Koolhaas Houselife, Book + DVD, published by Bêka & Partners, 2013
- Koolhaas Houselife (extended version), Book + DVD, published by Bêka & Partners, 2008
