= In Love, Every Pleasure Has Its Pain =

- Directed by: Gianfranco De Bosio
- Written by: Leo Benvenuti; Piero De Bernardi; Gianfranco De Bosio; Nino Manfredi; Guido Stagnaro
- Cinematography: Roberto Gerardi
- Music by: Carlo Rustichelli
- Release date: December 20, 1971
- Language: Italian

In Love, Every Pleasure Has Its Pain (Italian: La Betìa ovvero in amore, per ogni gaudenza, ci vuole sofferenza) is a 1971 commedia all'italiana film directed by Gianfranco De Bosio. It is based on the comedy play La Betia by Angelo Beolco.

== Cast ==
- Nino Manfredi as Nale
- Rosanna Schiaffino as Betìa
- Ljubiša Samardžić (credited as Smoki Samardì) as Zilio
- Eva Ras as Tamia
- Mario Carotenuto as Tacio
- Olivera Marković as Menega
- Lino Toffolo as Bazzarello
- Boban Petrović as Menegazzo
- Franco Pesce as Barba Scatti
- Claudio Trionfi as Michele Rosegato

== Production ==
After seeing La Betìa by Angelo Beolco performed at the Piccolo Teatro di Milano in 1969, producer Alfredo Bini was impressed enough to commission theatre director Gianfranco De Bosio, a longtime scholar of Beolco who had staged La Betìa since 1951, to adapt it for the screen. To recreate the sixteenth-century Padua setting of the play, Bini arranged an Italian-Yugoslav co-production and filmed in the Serbian countryside.

== Reception ==
The film was released in December 1971 and was a major success, grossing nearly 2 billion lire at the Italian box office.

== See also ==
- List of Italian films of 1971
