= Sonsini =

Sonsini is a surname. Notable people with the surname include:

- John Sonsini (born 1950), American artist
- Larry Sonsini (born c. 1941), American lawyer
