= Ishi Glinsky =

American contemporary artist (born 1982)

- Born: 1982 (age 43–44); Tucson, Arizona, U.S.
- Education: University of Arizona
- Known for: Sculpture, installation, painting
- Notable work: Inertia – Warn the Animals (2023); Coral vs. King Snake Jacket (2019)
- Movement: Contemporary art
- Website: ishiglinsky.com

Ishi Glinsky (born 1982, Tucson, Arizona) is a Native American (Tohono O'odham Nation) contemporary artist based in Los Angeles.

== Early life and education ==
Ishi Glinsky was born in 1982 in Tucson, Arizona. He is a member of the Tohono O’odham Nation through his father, and is of German Bohemian descent through his mother. Glinsky began embracing his indigenous heritage as a teenager, when he began making regalia and dancing at powwows.

Glinsky studied painting and drawing at the University of Arizona before relocating to Los Angeles in 2006, where he continues to live and work.

== Career and work ==
Glinsky's artistic practice is diverse in medium (sculpture, painting, jewelry) and approach (abstraction, representation). However, many of his works are large-scale representations of Tohono O'odham art and material culture. He has also created works based on other Native American art forms, such as Zuni jewelry and Plains ledger art. Many of his painted works draw on basket weaving patterns in either an abstract or representational sense. Some of his sculptural work also incorporates elements of pop culture, representing characters such as the Pink Panther and Ghostface.

Glinsky had his first all-sculpture exhibition in 2008. He began working with large-scale sculpture at this point, becoming inspired after working on a sculpture of an oversized necklace. Although his early work incorporated found elements, such as rusty chains stolen from parking lots, he quickly moved to store-bought materials.

In 2022, Glinsky had his first solo museum exhibition at the Art, Design and Architecture Museum in Santa Barbara. His sculpture Inertia—Warn the Animals was included in the 2023 Made in LA Biennial at the Hammer Museum. Two of his pieces were exhibited at the U.S. Consulate in Nogales in 2025.

Glinsky is represented both by Chris Sharp Gallery (Los Angeles) and P.P.O.W. (New York City).

=== Collaborations ===
In addition to his sculptural and installation practice, Glinsky has collaborated with major cultural institutions and brands to expand Indigenous visibility in contemporary design. In 2019, he partnered with Ralph Lauren on limited-edition footwear, marking one of the few instances of direct collaboration between a major American fashion house and a contemporary Native artist.

== Selected exhibitions ==
- 2020: Comedy of Erros, Stars Gallery, Los Angeles, CA
- 2017: New Warrior, Open Studio Gallery, Tokyo, JP
- 2014: C/O Ishi Glinsky, MOCA, Tucson, AZ

=== Solo ===
- 2018: Woven Path, These Days, Los Angeles
- 2021: Monuments to Survival, Chris Sharp Gallery, Los Angeles
- 2022: Upon a Jagged Maze, AD&A Museum UCSB, Santa Barbara, CA
- 2023: Lifetimes That Broke the Earth, Chris Sharp Gallery, Los Angeles
- 2024: Duration of Being Known, P.P.O.W., New York, NY

=== Group ===
- 2023: Indian Theater: Native Performance, Art, and Self-Determination Since 1969, Hessel Museum of Art, Annandale-on-Hudson, NY
- 2023: Made in L.A. 2023: Acts of Living, Hammer Museum, Los Angeles
