= Marry Me However =

- Film poster
- Directed by: Mordechai Vardi
- Release date: September 2020
- Country: Israel
- Language: Hebrew

Marry Me However is a documentary film directed by Rabbi Mordechai Vardi. The film tells the stories of religious LGBT people who married members of the opposite sex, and of their ex-spouses. Some of the subjects underwent conversion treatments.

Among other things, the film depicts:

1. A gay man who claims that his sex with his wife reminded him of a rape
2. A woman her husband "treated as a child-making enterprise"
3. A man who thinks God "has inflicted loneliness on him"

The film was released in September 2020, with the support of Channel HOT8, and screened Festival Docaviv, and in October 2020 HOT8 channel as well.

== Critical reception ==
According to Ynet, the documentary "traces the religious zealots who believed they were flawed, the young women who married them, and became a tool on the road to redemption, and the rabbis, who allowed this nightmare to happen knowingly". Mako wrote that the film is a "story of confused young men and women whose religious-national establishment they grew up trying to "straighten" them through Judaism". A Makorrishon opinion piece wrote that the film should be screened in every high school, yeshiva, and theatre in Israel.

=== Comments from creator ===
Rabbi Mordechai Vardi commented that the film demonstrates "another symptom of the leadership crisis of religious Zionism". He advises that, "I knew I was entering a battlefield", before commencing work on the film. The film's content addressed one of the "burning issues in recent years among the national-religious public", namely queer Jews who want to marry members of the opposite sex in order to maintain a religious lifestyle. After conducting meetings with his students at the Netanya and Maalot yeshivot, he began researching for the production of the film.
