= The Pastoral =

1521 play by Angelo Beolco

La Pastoral (Ruzante)
- Author: Ruzante
- Language: Paduan dialect, bergamasque dialect
- Genre: Comedy
- Publication date: 1521
- Publication place: Italy

The Pastoral, (Paduan: La Pastoral), is a comedy by Venetian playwright Angelo Beolco, also known by the pseudonym Ruzante, written in 1521. Beolco's play depicts the bucolic of the shepherds of the Paduan countryside, with his character Ruzante delivering verses in a distinct rustic style. Beolco's depiction of the ancient Greek god Pan furthermore suggests a reference to the Eclogues of Virgil.

== Characters ==
- Siringa, nymph
- Milesio, farmer
- Mopso, farmer
- Arpino, farmer
- Lacerto, farmer
- Mastro Franceso, doctor
- Ruzante
- Zilio
- Bertuol

== Plot ==
The first part, composed in alternating-rhyme tercets, tells the story of the old man Mileso, in love with the nymph Siringa, who mocks and refuses him. Because of his disappointment, the farmer commits suicide. He is found by another farmer, Mopso, who, upon seeing him dead, faints. A third farmer, Arpino, unexpectedly arrives, who, upon seeing the two friends and believing them to be dead, decides to give them an honourable burial. Since he is unable to do it by himself, he goes to find Ruzante for help.

In the second part, Ruzante agrees to help on the condition that Arpino permits him to eat and take his overcoat. Realising that Mopso is only passed out, Ruzante urges his friend to call a doctor, Mastro Francesco, to try and awake him. However he regrets it as he realises that he will have to renounce taking Mospo's coat. Because of this, Ruzante decides instead to extort a free cure for his sickly father out of the situation. Mastro Franceso, who is promised fair compensation, arrives, revives Mopso and gives the remedy to Ruzante, who quickly runs home. Mopso and Arpino bury Mileso below the altar of Pan, and sacrifice a lamb. Ruzante returns in time to eat the meat of the animal, and to thank Mastro Franceso. Thanks to his remedy, the father is dead, leaving Ruzante the house and flock.

== Sources ==
- Carlson, Raymond (2024-06-01). "Riccio, Ruzante, and the Localized Languages of the Renaissance Bronze". Renaissance Quarterly. 77 (2). doi:10.1017/rqx.2024.105. ISSN 0034-3448.
- Carroll, Linda (2002-01-01). "The Shepherd Meets the Cowherd: Ruzante's Pastoral, the Empire and Venice". Annuario dell'Istituto Romeno di cultura e ricerca umanistica.
- Fido, Franco (1973). "An Introduction to the Theater of Angelo Beolco". Renaissance Drama. 6: 203–218. ISSN 0486-3739.
