= Marco Aurelio Alvarotti =

Italian comedian

Marco Aurelio Alvarotti (born Padua - died in the 15th century) was an Italian comedian.

He was a friend and companion of Ruzante and played in his comedies but popularly known as Menato.
