= Gianfranco De Bosio =

Italian film director (1924–2022)

Gianfranco de Bosio
- Born: 16 September 1924; Verona, Italy
- Died: 2 May 2022 (aged 97); Milan, Italy
- Education: University of Padua
- Occupation: Film director

Gianfranco de Bosio (16 September 1924 – 2 May 2022) was an Italian film and theatre director.

== Filmography ==
=== Cinema ===
- The Terrorist (1963)
- In Love, Every Pleasure Has Its Pain (1971)

=== Television ===
- Giorgio Dandin (1971)
- Moses the Lawgiver (1974)
- Tosca (1976)
- Il mercante di Venezia (1979)
- Delitto di stato (1982)
- Elisabetta, regina d'Inghilterra (1985)
- Venezia salvata o la congiura tradita (1986)
- Un ballo in maschera (1986)
