= Simon Frug =

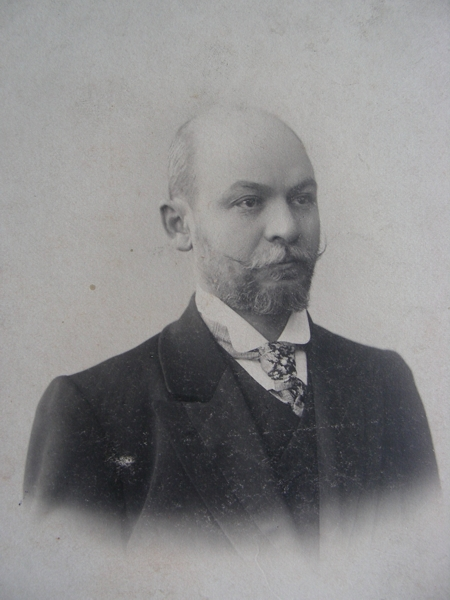
- Born: Simeon Samuel Grigoryevich Frug; 15 November 1860; Bobrovy-Kut, Kherson Governorate, Russian Empire
- Died: 21 September 1916 (aged 55); Odessa
- Occupations: Poet, lyricist and author
- Writing career
- Language: Yiddish, Russian, Hebrew

Simon Frug (Russian: Семён Григо́рьевич Фру́г, IPA: [sʲɪˈmʲɵn ɡrʲɪˈɡorʲjɪvʲɪtɕ ˈfruk] also known as Shimen Shmuel Frug; 15 November 1860 – 21 September 1916) was a multi-lingual Russian and Yiddish poet, lyricist and author.

He was born in Ukraine at the Jewish agricultural colony of Bobrovy-Kut, in the Kherson Governorate of the Russian Empire. During his youth he received religious training at his native village. At the age of 16 he began writing Russian poetry and was first published in 1880 in the Russophone Jewish magazine Razsvet (ru) ("Dawn"). The following year he moved to St. Petersburg, where he became a prominent literary figure and began publishing regularly, albeit often under a pseudonym. His 1882 Legend of the Goblet won an important prize and, when translated into Yiddish by Isaac Leib Peretz, the song reached an international audience.

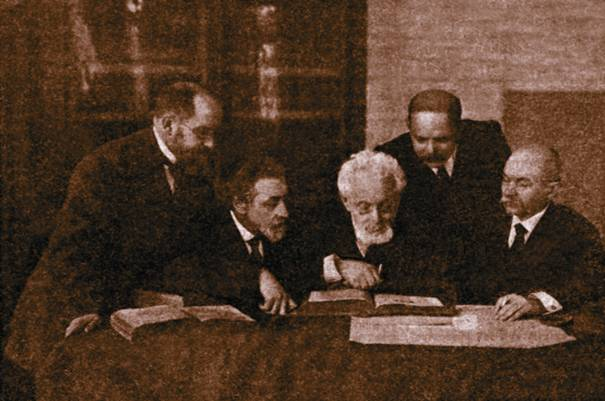
The Odessa literary group in 1916; from left to right: Yehoshua Hana Rawnitzki, Shloyme Ansky, Mendele M. Sforim, Hayim N. Bialik, Simon Frug.

Shaken by the pogroms of 1881–1882, he joined the Hibbat Zion (Love of Zion) movement, and his poem Jewish Melody became an anthem to Russians seeking a Jewish state in what is now Israel. In 1885 his first volume of poetry was released. His collected Yiddish poems were published in 1886 as Lider un Gedanken. Additional volumes followed in 1890 and 1897. Some time after 1898 his fable Palma became available. His Zionistic songs were published in 1902.

Frug wrote in Yiddish, Russian and Hebrew. For a period of time, followers of his work came to regard him as the national Jewish poet of Russia. He preferred folk themes and used light verses to express the suffering of people and the tragedy of Jewish homelessness. He died in Odessa at the age of 56 after a brief illness, and 100,000 people attended his funeral march.

== Memorialization ==
Various cities in Israel have commemorated Frug by naming a street for him, including Tel Aviv, Haifa, Holon, Kfar Saba, Ramat Gan and Netanya.
