= LOOP Barcelona =

Annual videoart festival in Barcelona

Loop
- Creation: 2003
- Location: Barcelona, Spain
- Creator: Asociación Art Barcelona
- Directors: Carlos Durán, Emilio Álvarez, Llucià Homs
- Website: loop-barcelona.com

LOOP Barcelona is an annual arts platform in Barcelona dedicated to artists' film and moving-image art.

Founded in 2003, the platform is structured around three sections: Loop Festival, Loop Fair and Loop Symposium. Over a two-week period, the Loop Festival presents works of 800 artists to nearly 200,000 visitors in 100 different locations across Barcelona, such as, museums, restaurants and shops.

44 galleries are annually invited by the Committee of the Loop fair, to present recent works of emerging and well-known artists to 4000 professionals, journalists, curators, and collectors. This selection is completed with presentations of magazines and distribution companies.

Loop is supported by the Government of Catalonia, the Spanish Ministry of Culture, as well as other institutional and corporate sponsors.

== History ==
=== 2003 ===
Loop Barcelona was established by the Barcelona Art Association in 2003 as an event dedicated to audiovisual art, emerging from the earlier New Art Fair, which used hotel rooms as exhibition spaces. The inaugural Loop Fair took place from November 27 to 30, 2003, at the Hotel Barceló Sants in Barcelona.

=== 2004 ===
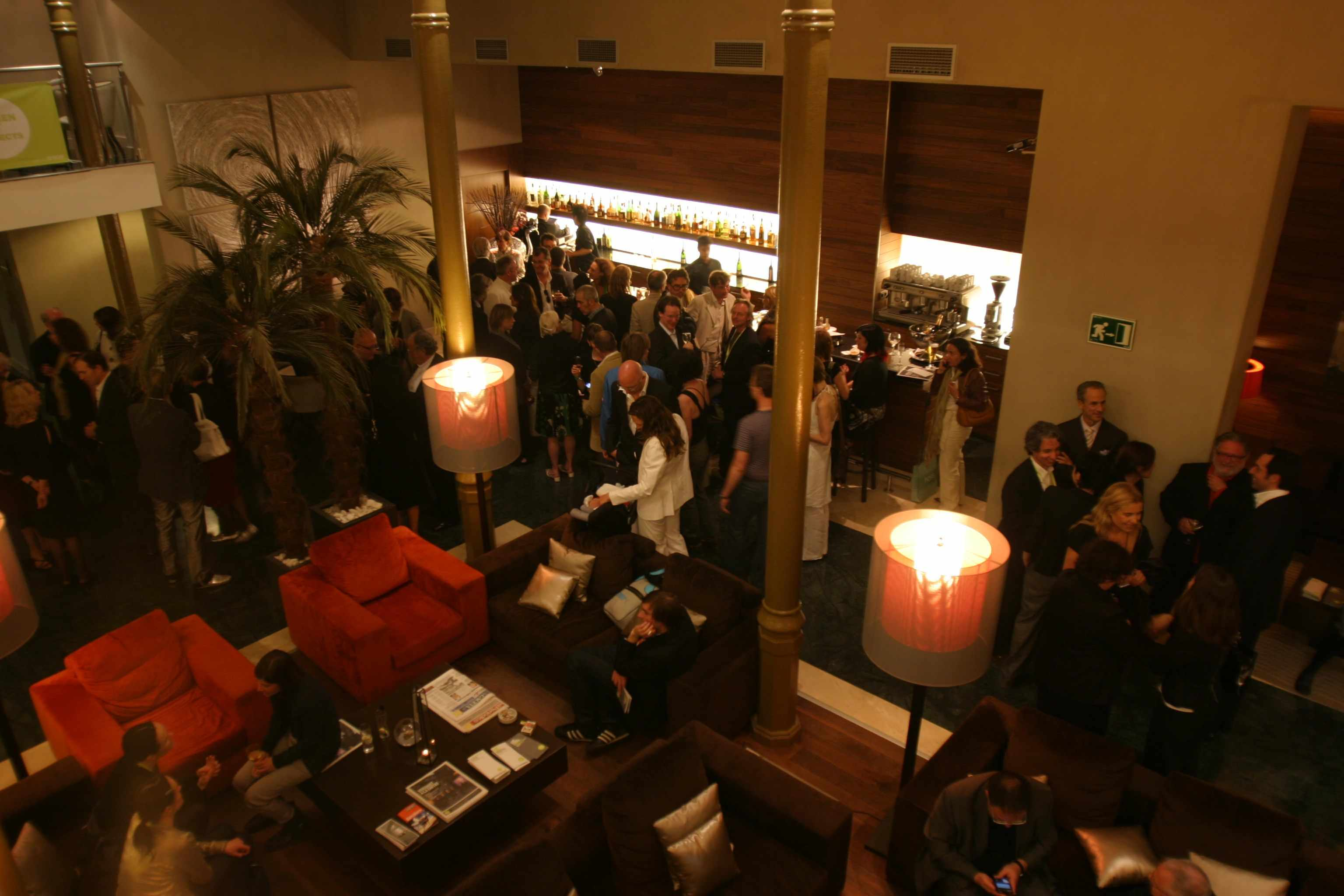
Hotel Catalonia Ramblas

Held from November 18 to 21, 2004, the fair featured 50 galleries across 50 rooms at the Hotel Barceló Sants, alongside a 900 m² exhibition area for museums, institutions, and contemporary art publications. The 2004 edition introduced a video art acquisition program by participating institutions and enterprises, as well as the parallel Off Loop festival in local arts centers and galleries, and conferences at CaixaForum.

=== 2005 ===
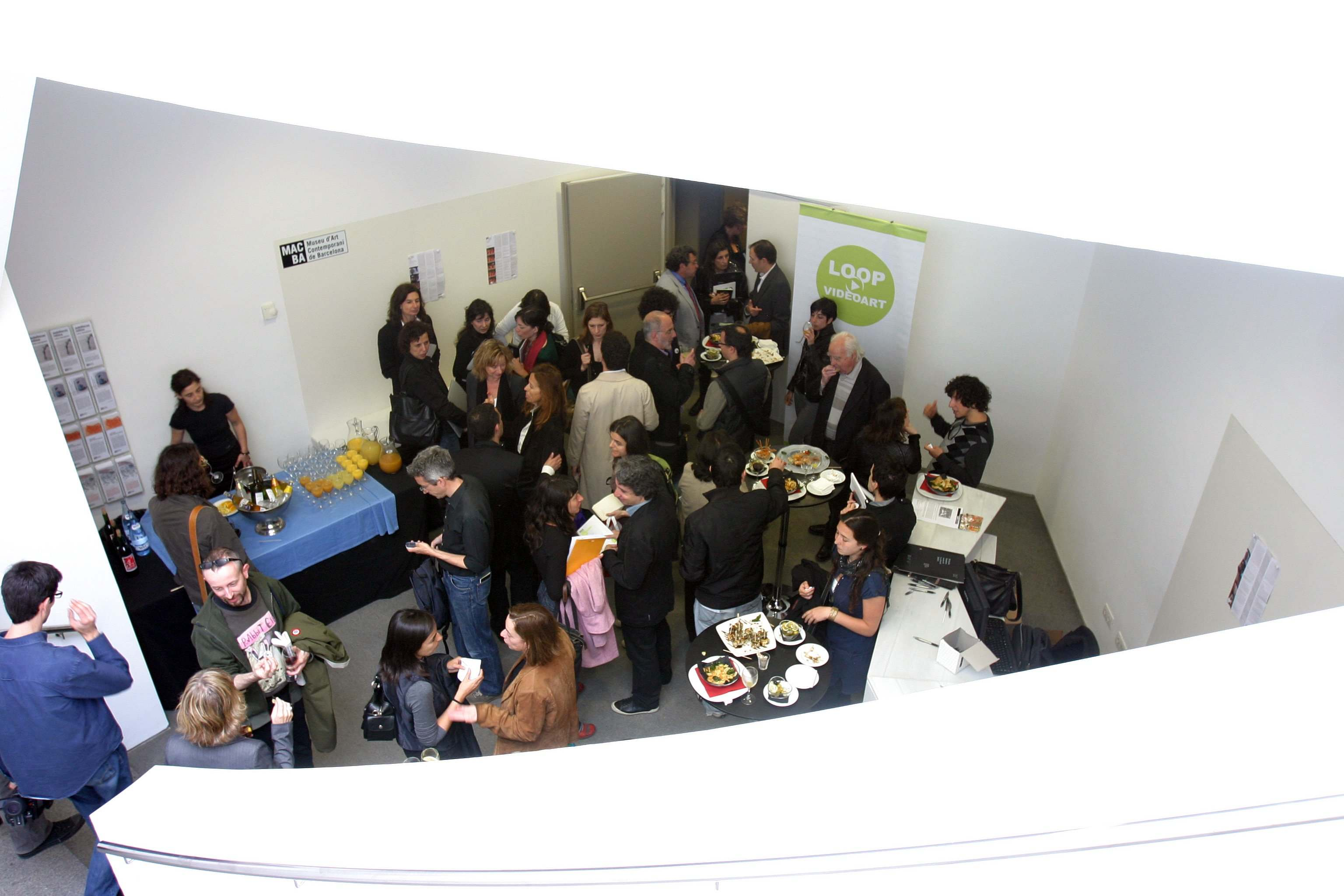
Press conference at the MACBA

From November 7 to 20, 2005, the Loop Festival featured works by more than 350 artists across eight city routes, including the Video London exhibition with over 150 London-based artists. The Loop Fair ran from November 10 to 13 at the Hotel Barceló Sants with 52 participating galleries.

=== 2006 ===
The Loop Festival ran from May 10 to 21, 2006, with the fourth edition of Loop Fair held from May 19 to 21 at the Hotel Pulitzer. The event included Video Zone, showcasing video art distributors and contemporary art magazines, as well as three days of panel discussions, lectures, and workshops.

=== 2007 ===
Running from May 23 to June 3, 2007, the fifth edition drew an estimated 180,000 visitors to works by over 800 artists across 108 venues, including the CCCB and MACBA. The Loop Fair hosted 43 galleries at the Hotel Catalonia Ramblas, while conference speakers included representatives from MoMA, Tate Modern, the Centre Pompidou, and ZKM. The program also featured a retrospective screening of works by artist Matthew Barney.

=== 2008 ===
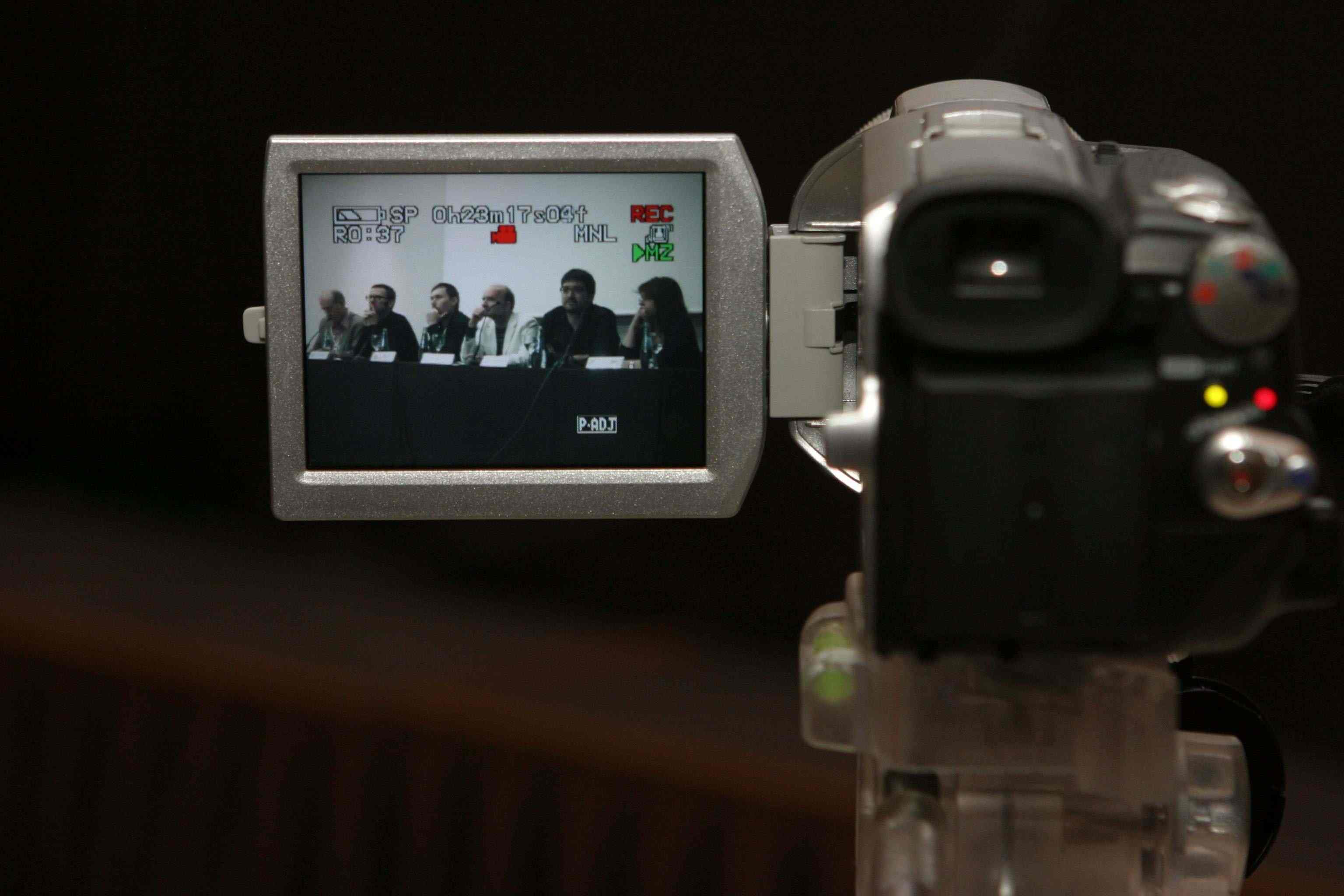
A conference in the hotel

The sixth edition took place from May 6 to 18, 2008, exhibiting works by over 800 artists in 142 venues across Barcelona. Held during the European Year of Intercultural Dialogue, the Loop Diverse program involved 16 immigrant collectives in Barcelona, screening works in 37 venues and concluding with a roundtable at the CCCB featuring artists Hannah Collins and M. Rosa Jijón. The Loop Fair hosted 44 galleries at the Hotel Catalonia Ramblas.

=== Awards ===
- Screen Projects Award: Awarded €2,000 and an invitation to the following edition for a gallery presentation at the fair.
- Loop Catalonia Award: Awarded €6,000 to a participating gallery for a featured work.
- MACBA Award: Acquisition of a selected video artwork for the collection of the MACBA.
