= Museum of Contemporary Art Busan =

Art museum in Busan, South Korea

Coordinates: 35.109277°N 128.942746°E

The Museum of Contemporary Art Busan (Korean: 부산현대미술관), also called MOCA Busan, is a modern art museum in Busan, South Korea. It opened on June 16, 2018. It was the exclusive venue for the 2018 Busan Biennale.

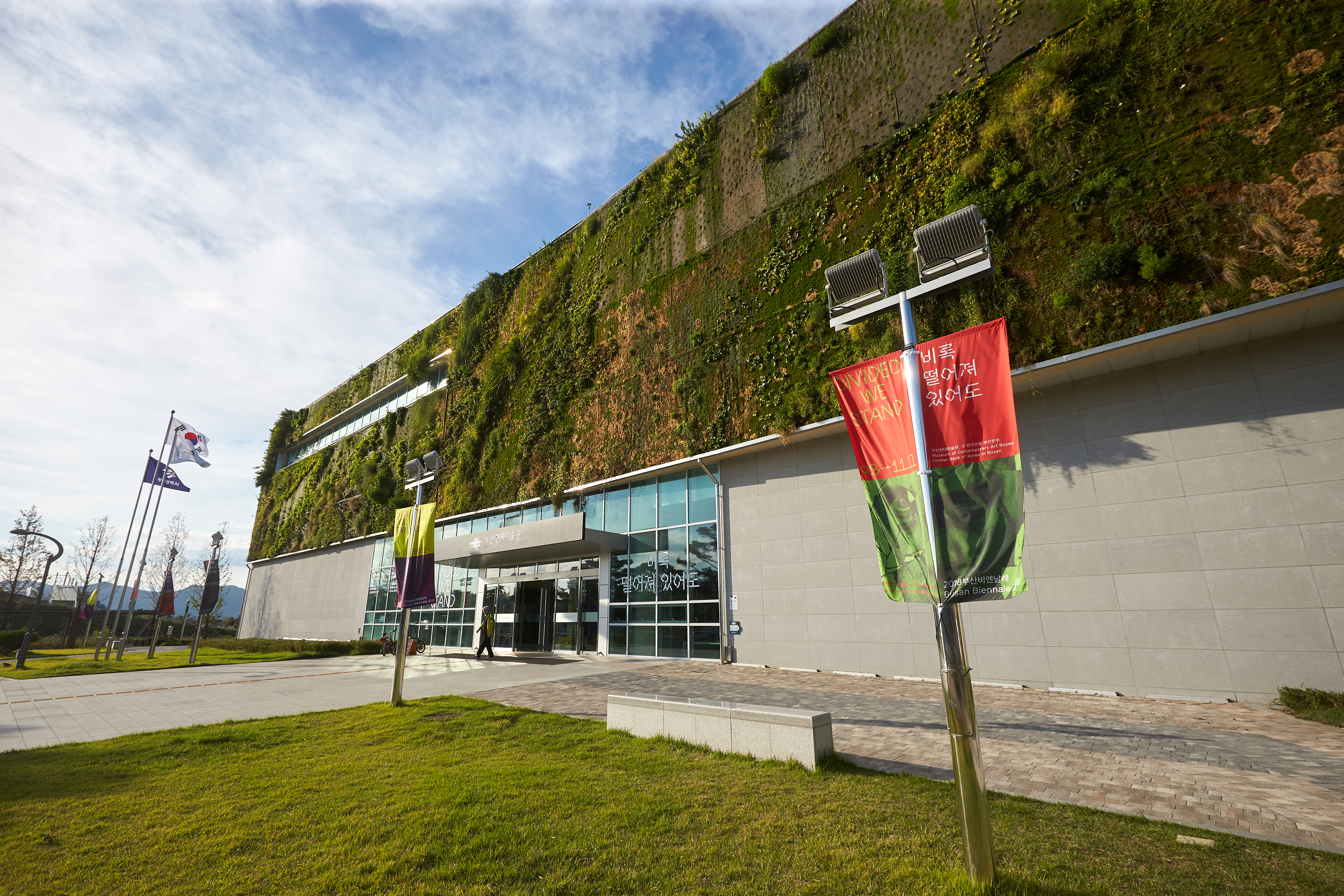
The museum during the Busan Biennale in 2018

The museum is located in Eulsukdo Island, which is known for its migratory bird population.

In January 2026, a new rooftop restaurant will open that overlooks the Nakdong River.
