= Andrea Calmo =

Italian actor and playwright (1510–1571)

Andrea Calmo (1510–1571) was a Venetian actor and author (dramatist) of Commedia dell'Arte. He was one of the pioneers of this type of masked theater, as created for the 16th century Venetian audience. Calmo departed from typical theater norms of the time, focusing less on the text and objectivity, and more on the whole performance as a piece of art in and of itself. Many of his ideas and communications were preserved in the 154 letters that he wrote to a variety of correspondents, from real government officials to possibly made-up women.

== Background ==
While it is unclear what class Calmo belonged to, information regarding the burial of his parents and his ability to leave an inheritance for his children suggests that he was likely part of the middle class, even if he never became fabulously wealthy. Calmo was married and had at least two daughters, according to his will. Judging by the content of his letters, Calmo had some education, as he frequently made use of technical terminology, Latin, and classical allusions.

== Influence ==
Prior to Calmo and others like him, the popular form of theatre in Italy was the Commedia Erudita. This form was primarily based in the practices of classical works of theatre and acting. Calmo would use several of these classical modes in his works, though he would mix them in with his own innovations and practices to depart from the original style.

== Depiction of social class differences ==
His six comedies are Las Spagnolas (1549), Il Saltuzza (1551), La Fiorina (1552), La Pozione (1552), La Rodiana (1553), and il Travaglio (1556). He also published a number of eclogues. All these works were typically in rhyme. Many of his works played extensively with different regional dialects, dialectical improvisation, and social class differences highlighted through different accents, much of which would become parts of Commedia dell'Arte.

== Utilization of music, physical comedy, and buffoonery ==
Calmo viewed the theatre as a way to make a living and kept economic needs in mind while writing, ensuring that people could perform his plays without needing months of preparation. His writing was also designed with theatricality in mind, and was not meant to be taken in primarily as literature but instead as performance. He also would utilize music and methods of physical comedy in his productions, focusing on the sensory effect of the performance. Calmo's use of a variety of different theatrical elements, from dialectical changes, music, complex stage directions, and buffoonery was an inspiration to many practitioners of Commedia dell'Arte who would utilize his methods in their own performances.

== Surviving commentary on dance terminology ==
In addition to his theatrical work, Calmo had a degree of experience with contemporary dance, frequently referencing dance terminology in his letters, such as the Bassadanza and Mesura, and doing so in a logical and comprehensible way.

== Correspondence with other artists ==
Calmo also corresponded with a number of important artists including Anton Francesco Doni, Pietro Aretino, and Tintoretto, discussing art and scenography. It was the examination of some of these letters that gave rise to the Pantalone character as it is known today, from its physicality to its notable speech patterns.

== Sources ==
- Boni, Filippo de' (1852). Biografia degli artisti ovvero dizionario della vita e delle opere dei pittori, degli scultori, degli intagliatori, dei tipografi e dei musici di ogni nazione che fiorirono da'tempi più remoti sino á nostri giorni. Seconda Edizione.. Venice; Googlebooks: Presso Andrea Santini e Figlio. p. 171.
- Castagno, Paul C. (1994-03-01). ""Mente teatrale: Andrea Calmo and the Victory of the Performance Text in Cinquecento commedia"". Journal of Dramatic Theory and Criticism: 27–58. ISSN 0888-3203.
- NEVILE, JENNIFER. “Learning the Bassadanza from a Wolf: Andrea Calmo and Dance.” Dance Research: The Journal of the Society for Dance Research, vol. 30, no. 1, 2012, pp. 80–97. JSTOR, www.jstor.org/stable/23326519. Accessed 14 Apr. 2020.
