= Jackie Amezquita =

Performance artist

- Born: August 10, 1985 (age 40); Quetzaltenango, Guatemala

Jackie Amézquita (born August 10, 1985, Quetzaltenango, Guatemala) is a Guatemalan-American performance artist. She is best known for her work exploring power structures and the effects of them on ourselves and the environment.

== Early life and education ==
Amézquita was born in Quetzaltenango, Guatemala and lived there with her grandmother until she was about 18 years old. In 2003, she moved to the United States, reuniting with her mother in Los Angeles, California. Her mother had traveled to Los Angeles when Amezquita was two years old, so they reunited after almost 15 years.

She received an Associate’s Degree in Visual Communications from Los Angeles Valley College and her Bachelor’s in Fine Art from ArtCenter College of Design, and was a candidate for the New Genre program at the University of California, Los Angeles where she earned her Master’s in Fine Arts in 2022.

== Art career ==
She is influenced by her experiences as an immigrant woman in the United States, often referencing the relationship she has with borders. Her artwork focuses on regeneration, whether it be about the history she has endured, the effects of migration, displacement, social adjustment, or self-development. She has compiled what she calls a “visual language” through weaving and the use of her own body. Her pieces challenge the systems of power in the United States by exploring how social settings shape stories and how economic and power differences affect the way people interact with their environment.

=== Materials ===
Being from Guatemala, Amézquita had been around produce and the natural world for most of her life. For that reason, she often sculpted using mud or the masa that was used to make tortillas since she did not grow up with conventional art materials like paint or canvases. Therefore, she would utilize the products that came from the earth, whether it be fruit or copper metal. However, in more recent art work she began to use soil, masa (dough), as well as corn, limestone, and salt.

Amézquita felt a connection toward the structure of the current food system in that like vegetables and fruits are regularly being moved across the border, so are migrant. So the produce she incorporates into her artwork is a way to emulate immigrant paths.

== Notable works ==
- De Norte a Sur (2019): a performance piece in which she went from the Mexico–United States border to the Guatemala–Mexico border
- Huellas Que Germinan (2018): performance piece in which she walked from Tijuana, Mexico to Los Angeles, California in silence, in eight days

== Notable exhibitions ==
- El Suelo que nos alimenta, The Hammer Museum
- Gemidos de la Tierra (Wailings of the Land/Soil) in Los Angeles Contemporary Exhibitions (LACE) in Los Angeles, California, Spring 2023

== Awards and grants ==
- Mohn Land Award (2023)
- Andy Warhol Foundation for the Arts Los Angeles Art Fund (2022)
- National Performance Network Fund (2022)
