= Ila Bêka =

Italian film director

Ila Bêka is a contemporary Italian artist, filmmaker and architectural producer based in Paris. He is best known as half of the architectural filmmaking duo Bêka & Lemoine, formed with French filmmaker Louise Lemoine.

Their works focuses on the intersection of human relationship and contemporary design. They emphasize the presence of everyday life within some of the most iconic architectural projects of recent decades. In 2016, the MoMA, Museum of Modern Art in New York acquired their complete body of work- comprising 16 films- for its permanent collection. The acquisition of a complete work by MoMA, Museum of Modern Art is considered as an extremely rare event for a living artist.

== Life and career ==
Bêka trained as an architect at the Università Iuav di Venezia in Venice and the École Nationale Supérieure d'Architecture de Paris-Belleville, where he studied under figures sucj as Aldo Rossi, Manfredo Tafuri, Vittorio Gregotti, Massimo Cacciari, Bernardo Secchi, Gino Valle, Ugo La Pietra, Henri Ciriani and Jacques Lucan.

In 2005, Bêka partnered with Louise Lemoine with whom he founded the research and production platform Bêka & Lemoine. Described by The New York Times as "cult figures in the European architecture world", Bêka and Lemoine focus their work on experimental new narrative and cinematographic forms in relation to contemporary architecture. Their collaborative debut, Koolhaas Houselife(2008), has been acclaimed by the international critique as "The architectural cult movie".

Ila Bêka has exhibited and delivered lectures at cultural institutions such as Venice Biennale (2008, 2010, 2014), MoMA (New-York), Metropolitan Museum of Art (New-York), Centre Pompidou (Paris), Palais de Tokyo (Paris), Barbican Art Gallery (London), Canadian Centre for Architecture (Montréal), NAi (Rotterdam, NL), MAXXI (Rome), SALT (Istanbul), Harvard GSD, Architectural Association School of Architecture (London), Mextropoli (Mexico).

According to ArchDaily, one of the most visited architecture websites worldwide, their films "alter the face of architectural criticism".

Ila Bêka is currently teaching Diploma 16 at AA School, Architectural Association School of Architecture in London.

== Filmography ==
- 2000: Millimetraggi (168 x 3min) - Short Film - Best Film at Festival du Film Très Court de Paris
- 2001: Colomba (2min) - Short Film - Best Film at Venice International Short Film Festival in Venice
- 2001: In Utero (11min) - Short Film - Official Selection at International Critic's Week at Cannes Film Festival
- 2002: L'uomo dei numeri (5,30min) - Documentary
- 2003: I have seen my mother dancing in the clouds (6min) - Short Film - Best International Short Film at 21 Torino Film Festival
- 2004: Salome & the seven heads (6min) - Video Installation
- 2004: Trilogy: Buongiorno (5min), Buonasera (5min), Buonanotte (5min) - 3 Short Films - Special Mention at Nastri d'Argento, Italy.
- 2005: Quodlibet (84min) - Feature Film - Official Selection at 58th Locarno International Film Festival
- 2005: "A Balare", a trilogy: "Frassinetti (62min), Pilastro (61min), Italicus (60min) - Documentaries
- 2006: Passero sublime (9min) - Video installation
- 2006: Mind scraping (5min) - Video installation, Contagion (5min) - Video installation, Reminiscenza onirica (5min) - Video installation
- 2006: Ventre (5min) - Video installation - Best Film at Festival Internazionale Cinema d'Arte di Milano
- 2007: Monsieur et Madame Pelletret (2 x 6min) - Video installation
- 2007: Testamento della Memoria (38min) - Documentary
- 2008: Koolhaas Houselife (58min) - Documentary - Official Selection at 8th Venice Biennale of Architecture
- 2010: Sound of Space (6min) - Video installation
- 2010: "Inside Piano": The Submarine (39min), "The little Beaubourg (26min), "The power of silence (34min) - 3 Documentaries
- 2012: Natural Histories (11min) - Video installation
- 2013: Pomerol, Herzog & de Meuron (51min) - Documentary
- 2013: Xmas Meier (51min) - Documentary
- 2013: Gehry's Vertigo, (48min) - Documentary - Official Selection at 10th Venice Biennale of Architecture (extract)
- 2013: Living Architectures Zip (60min) - Documentary - Best Film at ArchFilmLund Festival, Sweden
- 2013: 25bis (46min) - Documentary
- 2014: La Maddalena (12min) - Video installation - Official Selection at 14th Venice Biennale of Architecture
- 2014: La Maddalena Chair (25min) - Video installation - Official Selection at 14th Venice Biennale of Architecture
- 2014: Alfred, une nuit vénitienne (70min) - Documentary
- 2014: 24 heures sur place (90min) - Documentary - Special Jury Prize at 32nd Torino Film Festival
- 2014: L'expérience du vide (45min) - Documentary
- 2014: Barbicania (90min) - Documentary - Art project commissioned by Barbican Centre
- 2015: The Infinite Happiness (85min) - Documentary
- 2015: Spiriti (15x3min circa)- Video installation- Art project commissioned by Fondazione Prada, Milano
- 2016: Voyage autour de la Lune (75min) - Documentary
- 2016: Selling Dreams (25min + 12min) - Video installation - Official Selection Oslo Triennale
- 2017: Moriyama-San (63min) - Documentary - Best Prize at Architecture Film Festival London
- 2019: Butohouse (34min) - Documentary - International Premiere at DocAviv Film Festival
- 2017-2020: Homo Urbanus (10 x 55min) - Video installation - Official Selection Seoul Biennale and Agora Biennale in Bordeaux
- 2020: Tokyo Ride (90min) - Documentary - Artistic Vision Award, Depth of Field Competition - Best Prize - Docaviv Film Festival, 2020
- 2021: Oslavia, The Cave of the Past Future (17min) - Video installation - World premiere at MAXXI Museum in Rome
- 2022: Big Ears Listen with Feet (93min) - Special Mention, Milano Design Film Festival, MDFF 2022, Milan
- 2023: Rehab from Rehab (86min) - In competition at Jihlava International Documentary Film Festival, Prague
- 2024: The Sense of Tuning (96min) - International Premiere at Fondation Cartier in Paris
- 2024: Softly Brutal (92min) - Official Selection Opus Bonus, Jilhava Film FEstival
- 2025: Spatial Disobedience (32min) - Presented at The Belém Cultural Center, Lisbon
- 2025: Transmutation (80min) - ‘Rotor. Entangled Matter’ at Bozar - Centre for Fine Arts, Brussels
- 2025: Esperando Soy (92min) - Presented at The Belém Cultural Center, Lisbon
- 2025: Vija The Impossible Portrait (82min) - Official Selection: FIFA Festival International du Film sur l’Art
- 2026: The world in a Square (72min) - ADFF 2026 New York, Toronto, Vancouver, Chicago, Detroit, Mumbai
- 2026: Mundo Frágil (103min) - World Premiere at MoMA Museum in New York in collaboration with ADFF

== Teaching ==
- In 2019-2022 he taught the Diploma Unit "Homo Urbanus, Laboratory for Sensitive Observers" at AA School, Architectural Association School of Architecture in London.
- In 2019-2021 he taught the course "Filming Architecture" at the AAM, the Accademia di Architettura di Mendrisio, in Switzerland.
- In 2021 he taught The Berlage Theory Master Class "A Journey Round My Room" at The Berlage Center for Advanced Studies in Architecture and Urban Design, in Delft.
- In 2020 he taught the course "MAXXI Architecture Film Summer School" at MAXXI The National Museum of XXI Century Arts, Rome, IT.
- In 2019-2020 he taught the course "Voyage autour de ma chambre" at HEAD, Haute École d'art et de design de Genève.
- In 2017 he taught the course "The Emotion of Space" at Domaine de Boisbuchet in Lessac, France.
- In 2016 and 2015 he taught the course "Filming Architecture" with Marco Müller and Louise Lemoine at the AAM, the Accademia di Architettura di Mendrisio, in Switzerland.
- In 2014 and 2013 he taught the course "Cinema & Architecture" at GSAPP Columbia University for the New York/Paris program.
- He has been teaching "Filming Architecture and Space" at Accademia di Architettura di Mendrisio, in Switzerland, since 2015.

== Recognition ==
- Awarded: Premio internazionale “Bruno Zevi”, In/Arch 2026
- Ila Bêka: Chevalier de l’Ordre des Arts et des Lettres, French Ministry of Culture, 2026
- MoMA, Museum of Modern Art in New York: The complete work (16 films) of Ila Bêka and Louise Lemoine has been acquired for the permanent collection.
- CNAP, Centre National des Arts Plastiques: "Koolhaas Houselife" and "La Maddalena" have been acquired for the permanent collection.
- FRAC Centre, Orléans: "Butohouse", "Moriyama-San", "The Infinite Happiness", "Selling Dreams", "Gehry's Vertigo" have been acquired for the permanent collection.
- Awarded by Metropolis (architecture magazine) as Game Changer 2015.
- Artist in residence at Villa Kujoyama in Kyoto, Japan, 2018.
- Rome Prize Italian Fellow at American Academy in Rome, Italy, 2018.
- Selected by Icon Design as one of the 100 most talented personalities in the world in 2017.
- Presented by the Metropolitan Museum of Art as one of the “Most exciting and critical design project of the year 2016”.
- Prix d'Honneur FILAF 2020, Festival International du Livre d’Art et du Film, Perpignan, 2020.

== Awards ==
- Prix d'Honneur - FILAF / Festival International du Livre d'Art et du Film, Perpignan, 2020: Bêka & Lemoine
- Best Film at MDFF, Milano Design Film Festival 2020: "Tokyo Ride"
- Artistic Vision Award at Docaviv Film Festival 2020: "Tokyo Ride"
- Best Film at Architecture Film Festival London 2019: "Moriyama-San"
- Best Film at Arquiteturas Film Festival Lisboa 2019: "Moriyama-San"
- Best Prize, Arqfilmfest, Santiago, Chile, 2018: "Moriyama-San"
- Best Prize, FILAF D’OR, Festival International du Livre d’Art et du Film, Perpignan, 2018: "Moriyama-San"
- Best Prize, FIFAAC, Bègles, France 2018: "Moriyama-San"
- Special Jury Prize at 32nd Torino Film Festival, Torino, Italy, 2014: "24 Heures sur Place"
- Best Architecture Documentaries for the film collection "Living Architectures" by the festival ArchFilmLund, 2013
- Best International Short Film at 21 Torino Film Festival for "I have seen my mother dancing in the clouds"
- Best Film at Festival du Film Très Court de Paris: "Millimetraggi"
- Best Film at Venice International Short Film Festival in Venice: "Colomba"
- Best Film at Jameson Award for "In Utero"
- Best Film at Premio Troisi festival for "Millimetraggi"
- Best Film at Festival Internazionale Cinema d'Arte di Milano: "Ventre"
- Best Film at Premio Troisi festival for "Buongiorno"
- Best Film at Maremetraggio Festival for "Millimetraggi"
- Best Film at Interfilm Berlin Film Festival Festival for "Buongiorno"
- Special Prize of the Jury at Festival Sobra Arte 2015 (Lisbon): "La Maddalena"
- Special Mention at Nastri d'Argento, Italy: "Buongiorno"

== Published Dvd-Books ==
- Beka & Lemoine, 2016, DVD-Box Set Volume 1 & 2. 0701197948082
- The Infinite Happiness, 2016, DVD. 0701197948105
- Koolhaas Houselife, 2016, DVD. 0701197948112
- Koolhaas Houselife, 2008, ISBN 978-88-903602-0-6.
- Koolhaas Houselife, 2013, ISBN 979-10-92194-00-5.
- Pomerol, Herzog & de Meuron, 2013, ISBN 979-10-92194-01-2.
- Xmas Meier, 2013, ISBN 979-10-92194-02-9.
- Gehry's Vertigo, 2013, ISBN 979-10-92194-03-6.
- Inside Piano, 2013, ISBN 979-10-92194-04-3.
- Living Architectures, 2013, ISBN 979-10-92194-05-0.

== General References ==
- Ada Luise Huxtable, « Ingenious and Demanding », The Wall Street Journal, 2009-09-30
- Christopher Hawthorne, « Tuesday at the Hammer: 'Koolhaas Houselife' », Los Angeles Times, 2010-08-03
- Oliver Wainwright, Oslo architecture triennale: Airbnb cosplay for the gig economy nomad, The Guardian, 2016-09-12.
- Frédérique Hedelmann, « Guadalupe et l'architecte », Le Monde, 2008-09-22
- Jean-Jacques Larrochelle, « Sacrées architectures », Le Monde, 2013-04-16
- Patricia Zohn, « Culture Zohn: Life in the Koolhaas », The Huffington Post, 2010-07-30 .
- Patricia Zohn, « Culture Zohn: the 2014 Venice Biennale, parte due », Huffington Post, 2014-10-06
- Rowan Moore, « 2014 Venice Architecture Biennale review: put yourself in their space… », The Guardian, 2014-06-08 .
- Oliver Wainwright, "Cathedrals of Culture", The Guardian, 2014-09-25.
- Susanne Kippenberger, "Raumpatrouille", Der Tagesspiegel, 2015-10-22.
- Elena Sommariva, "Voyage autour de la Lune", Domus, 2016-01-29
- Karsten R.S. Ifversen, "8Tallet", Politiken, 2015-11-13
- Isabelle Regnier, “Ila Bêka et Louise Lemoine : Nous filmons la ville à l’échelle des citadins que nous sommes”, Le Monde, 2020-10-07
- Wojciech Czaja, “Das ist der Homo Urbanus”, Der Standard, 2020-08-02
- Edwin Heathcote, “Living with a starchitect’s early work”, Financial Times, 2019-07-26
- Camille Juza, “Arpentez une maison d’architecte en regardant Koolhaas Houselife et envisagez votre intérieur d’un autre oeil”, France Culture, 2020-05-05
- Sara Marzullo, “L’umanità in città”, Il Tascabile, 2020-06-18
