= Christa Prets =

Austrian politician

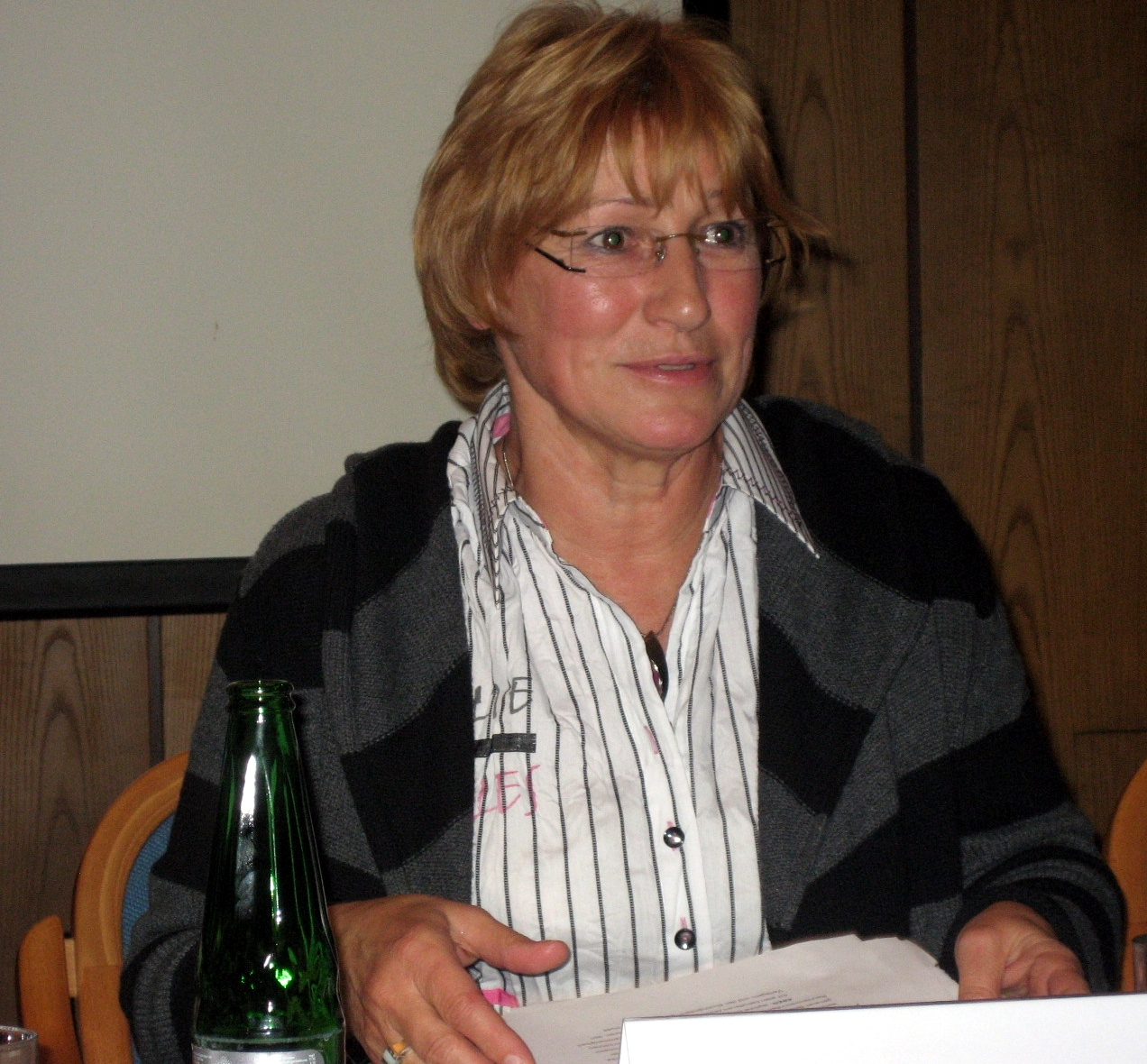
- Christa Prets at the Kribibi Conference.

Member of the European Parliament
- Incumbent
- Assumed office 1999

Personal details
- Born: 2 October 1947 (age 78) Diez, Germany
- Party: Social Democratic Party
- Other political affiliations: Party of European Socialists

Christa Prets (born 2 October 1947 in Diez, Germany) is an Austrian politician and Member of the European Parliament (MEP). She is a member of the Social Democratic Party, which is part of the Party of European Socialists, and sits on the European Parliament's Committee on Culture and Education and its Committee on Women's Rights and Gender Equality.

She is also a substitute for the Committee on Regional Development, vice-chair of the delegation for relations with Iran, and a substitute for the delegation to the EU–Romania Joint Parliamentary Committee.

== Career ==
- Secretarial training (1964–1966)
- Institute for Physical Education, Mainz (1966–1968)
- Coached various sporting groups (1969–1994)
- Veterinary assistant (1974–1994)
- Member of local council (1987–1990)
- Deputy mayor (1990–1991)
- Mayor of Pöttsching (1991–1994)
- Regional councillor, Burgenland (1994–1999)
- Board member, ASKÖ sport and physical education committee (since 1989)
- Member of the European Parliament (since 1999)
- Gold Order of Merit, Republic of Austria
