= Luzzati =

Luzzati is a surname. Notable people with the surname include:

- Emanuele Luzzati (1921–2007), Italian artist and filmmaker
- Mariannita Luzzati (born 1963), Brazilian visual artist
- Luigi Luzzatti (1841–1927), Italian financier and politician
