= Louise Lemoine =

French video artist and filmmaker

Louise Lemoine is a French video artist and filmmaker. She is an associate of the film production and publishing company Bêka & Partners.

== Early life and education ==
Lemoine grew up in Bordeaux, France. Her parents ran the family-owned newspaper, Sud Ouest (South West). After her father, Jean-François Lemoîne lost the use of his legs, the family commissioned Rem Koolhaas (OMA Architectural firm) to build a house that was wheelchair accessible The house has been featured in an architectural exhibition at the Museum of Modern Art in New York. Lemoîne also later included this house in her "Living Architectures" series. Lemoine studied art history at the Sorbonne University (Paris 1) with a DEA degree under the research director fr:Nicole Brenez.

== Career ==
Lemoine lives and works between France and Italy. Since 2005 she has been working in collaboration with her husband Ila Bêka with whom she founded the research and creation platform Bêka&Partners.

Presented by The New York Times as "cult figures in the European architecture world", Lemoine and Bêka mainly focus their research on experimenting new narrative and cinematographic forms in relation to contemporary architecture.

Koolhaas Houselife, the first film she co-directed with Bêka in 2008, has been acclaimed by the international critique as "the architectural cult movie". They self-financed the film in order to assure creative freedom.

Following the success of Koolhaus Houselife, Bêka and Lemoine shot the four other films that would make up their Living Architectures series. This series, which comprises Koolhaus Houselife; Pomerol, Herzog & de Meuron; Xmas Meier; Gehry's Vertigo; and Inside Piano, follows the mundane realities of maintaining buildings by renowned architects, including Rem Koolhaas (the Bordeaux house), Frank Gehry (the Bilbao Guggenheim), and Auguste Perret.

Her films have been selected and awarded in some important international film festivals such as CPH:DOX, Chicago International Film Festival, DocAviv, Torino Film Festival, FIFA, etc.

She has been invited to lecture and present her films in many international cultural institutions and prestigious universities such as Venice Biennale (2008, 2010, 2014), MoMA (New York), Metropolitan Museum of Art (New-York), Centre Pompidou (Paris), Palais de Tokyo (Paris), Barbican Art Gallery (London), Canadian Centre for Architecture (Montréal), NAi (Rotterdam, NL), MAXXI (Rome), Harvard GSD, Architectural Association School of Architecture (London), Mextropoli (Mexico).

Her films are part of important art collections, the CNAP have acquired in 2014 a copy of Koolhaas Houselife and in 2015 a copy of the video installation La Maddalena for the French national collections. The video work Spiriti has been commissioned by Fondazione Prada for their private collection.

In 2016 Ila Bêka and Louise Lemoine's complete work (16 films) has been acquired by MoMA, Museum of Modern Art in New York.

== Recognition ==
- MoMA, Museum of Modern Art in New York: The complete work (16 films) of Ila Bêka and Louise Lemoine has been acquired for the permanent collection.
- CNAP, Centre National des Arts Plastiques: "Koolhaas Houselife" and "La Maddalena" have been acquired for the permanent collection.
- Awarded by Metropolis (architecture magazine) as Game Changer 2015.
- Artist in residence at Villa Kujoyama in Kyoto, Japan, 2018.
- Selected by Icon Design as one of the 100 most talented personalities in the world in 2017.
- Presented by the Metropolitan Museum of Art as one of the “Most exciting and critical design project of the year 2016”.

== Teaching ==
- In 2019 she teaches Diploma Unit "Homo Urbanus, Laboratory for Sensitive Observers" at AA School, Architectural Association School of Architecture in London.
- In 2019 she teaches the course "Voyage autour de ma chambre" at HEAD, Haute École d'art et de design de Genève.
- In 2017 she taught the course "The Emotion of Space" at Domaine de Boisbuchet in Lessac, France.
- In 2016 and 2015 she taught the course "Filming Architecture" with Marco Müller and Louise Lemoine at the AAM, the Accademia di Architettura di Mendrisio, in Switzerland.
- In 2014 and 2013 she taught the course "Cinema & Architecture" at GSAPP Columbia University for the New York/Paris program.

== Awards ==
- Best Architecture Documentaries for the film collection Living Architectures by the festival ArchFilmLund, 2013.
- Special Prize of the Jury at Torino Film Festival 2014 for the film 24 Heures sur Place. Italian Docs official selection.
- Best Film at Architecture Film Festival London: "Moriyama-San"
- Best Film at Arquiteturas Film Festival Lisboa: "Moriyama-San"
- Best Prize, Arqfilmfest, Santiago, Chile, 2018: "Moriyama-San"
- Best Prize, FILAF D’OR, Festival International du Livre d’Art et du Film, Perpignan, 2018: "Moriyama-San"
- Best Prize, FIFAAC, Bègles, France
- Special Jury Prize at 32nd Torino Film Festival: "24 Heures sur Place"
- Best Architecture Documentaries for the film collection "Living Architectures" by the festival ArchFilmLund, 2013
- Special Prize of the Jury for the film La Maddalena at Festival Sobra Arte 2015 (Lisbon).

== Filmography ==
- 2008: Koolhaas Houselife (58min) - Documentary - Official Selection at 8th Venice Biennale of Architecture
- 2010: Inside Piano: The Submarine (39min),The little Beaubourg (26min),The power of silence (34min) - 3 Documentaries
- 2013: Pomerol, Herzog & de Meuron (51min) - Documentary
- 2013: Xmas Meier (51min) - Documentary
- 2013: Gehry's Vertigo (48min) - Documentary - Official Selection at 10th Venice Biennale of Architecture (extract)
- 2013: Living Architectures Zip (60min) - Documentary - Best Film at ArchFilmLund Festival, Sweden
- 2013: 25bis (46min) - Documentary
- 2014: La Maddalena (12min) - Video installation - Official Selection at 14th Venice Biennale of Architecture
- 2014: La Maddalena Chair (25min) - Video installation - Official Selection at 14th Venice Biennale of Architecture
- 2014: 24 Heures sur Place (90min) - Documentary - Special Jury Prize at 32nd Torino Film Festival
- 2014: L'expérience du vide (45min) - Documentary
- 2014: Barbicania (90min) - Documentary - Art project commissioned by Barbican Centre - Official Selection at DocAviv, BAFICI, AFFR, DokuArts
- 2015: The Infinite Happiness (85min) - Documentary - Official Selection at CPH:DOX, Chicago International Film Festival, DocAviv, FIFA, ADFF New York
- 2015: Spiriti (15x3min circa) - Video installation - Art project commissioned by Fondazione Prada, Milano
- 2016: Voyage autour de la Lune (75min) - Documentary - Official Selection at BAFICI, Copenhagen Architecture Festival, Agora Biennal
- 2016: Selling Dreams (25min + 12min) - Video installation - Official Selection Oslo Triennale
- 2017: Moriyama-San (63min) - Documentary - Best Prize at Architecture Film Festival London
- 2019: Butohouse (34min) - Documentary - International Premiere at DocAviv Film Festival.
- 2017-2019: Homo Urbanus (10 x 55min) - Video installation - Official Selection Seoul Biennale and Agora Biennale in Bordeaux
- 2020: Tokyo Ride (90min) - Documentary - Artistic Vision Award, Depth of Field Competition - Best Prize - Docaviv Film Festival, 2020

== Published Dvd-Books ==
- Koolhaas Houselife, 2008, ISBN 978-88-903602-0-6.
- Koolhaas Houselife, 2013, ISBN 979-10-92194-00-5.
- Pomerol, Herzog & de Meuron, 2013, ISBN 979-10-92194-01-2.
- Xmas Meier, 2013, ISBN 979-10-92194-02-9.
- Gehry's Vertigo, 2013, ISBN 979-10-92194-03-6.
- Inside Piano, 2013, ISBN 979-10-92194-04-3.
- Living Architectures, 2013, ISBN 979-10-92194-05-0.

== General References ==
- Frédérique Hedelmann, "Guadalupe et l'architecte", Le Monde, 2008-09-22
- Jean-Jacques Larrochelle, "Sacrées architectures", Le Monde, 2013-04-16
- Patricia Zohn, "CultureZohn: The 2014 Venice Architecture Biennale, Parte Due", Huffington Post, 2014-10-06
- Rowan Moore, "2014 Venice Architecture Biennale review: put yourself in their space…", The Guardian, 2014-06-08 .
- Susanne Kippenberger, "Raumpatrouille", Der Tagesspiegel, 2015-10-22.
- Elsa Fernandez Santos, "La casa de Guadalupe", El País, 2009-04-13
- Elena Sommariva, "Voyage autour de la Lune", Domus, 2016-01-29
- Karsten R.S. Ifversen, "8Tallet", Politiken, 2015-11-13
