= John Sonsini =

American artist (born 1950)

John Sonsini (born 1950) is an artist based in Los Angeles who paints primarily with oils. His best known work is portraits of Latino day laborers, where Sonsini offered his subjects their usual wage in exchange for sitting for the paintings. He has also made work based on gay male erotica.

== Early life and education ==
Sonsini was born in Rome, New York to an Italian-American family. He moved to Los Angeles with his family as a child, where he grew up in North Hollywood in the San Fernando Valley. He attended California State University, Northridge where he graduated with a degree in art in 1974.

== Career ==
Sonsini has mounted successful exhibitions at a variety of art galleries and other venues, from the mid-1980s to the 2020s. He is known for his deep exploration of male subjects in his paintings, and his subjects include gay and non-gay individuals, working-class men, Latino immigrants, and day laborers from Los Angeles street corners. Sonsini's frequent subject, a Mexican American immigrant named Gabriel, played a significant role in shaping his artistic direction. Under Gabriel's influence, Sonsini shifted from painting exclusively nude or half-dressed poses with homoerotic undertones to painting fully clothed men, creating a more inclusive and personal connection with his subjects.

Based in downtown Los Angeles, Sonsini often painted portraits of day laborers from Latin America, depicting them in the modest clothes they wear while waiting for work. Sonsini's work gained increasing acclaim, leading to exhibitions at many different galleries across the United States, including a successful show at New York's Anthony Grant Gallery.

Sonsini's artistic influences include the work of Bob Mizer, founder of Physique Pictorial, a significant magazine in gay culture, and abstract painters like Willem de Kooning and Francis Bacon. His art often combines abstraction with the human figure, and he emphasizes personal encounters with live models in his work. Sonsini's paintings are known for their collaborative nature, with many of the colors and poses inspired by the sitters themselves. Sonsini believes that finding one specific subject can be as essential as searching for a broader theme.

One critic has written that Sonsini's work offers a powerful and beautiful portrayal of his subjects, showcasing their stories and identities to the audience. Another has written that Sonsini's art is characterized by a Whitmanesque affection that permeates both the paint and the portraiture, creating a sense of genuine connection between the artist and his subjects.

With a successful career and growing recognition, Sonsini continues to create art, frequently painting his subjects in group portraits. According to critics his paintings captured the essence of his subjects, showcasing their individuality while reflecting the collective struggles they face in their lives.

== Selected exhibitions ==
2015

John Sonsini, Patrick Painter Gallery, Santa Monica

2006

New Paintings, ACME., Los Angeles

2005

John Sonsini, Anthony Grant Gallery, New York

Cerca Series: John Sonsini, Museum of Contemporary Art, San Diego

2002

John Sonsini, Peter Blake Gallery, Laguna Beach

L.A. Post Cool, The San Jose Museum of Art, San Jose

1999

Gabriel, New Paintings, Dan Bernier Gallery, Dan Bernier, Los Angeles

1995

Dan Bernier Gallery, Santa Monica

1986

Newspace Gallery, Los Angeles
