= Moriyama-San =

2017 film by Ila Bêka and Louise Lemoine

Moriyama-San is a 2017 documentary film directed by Ila Bêka and Louise Lemoine. The film offers an intimate and unconventional exploration of the life and home of Yasuo Moriyama, a reclusive yet charismatic figure living in a unique architectural masterpiece in Tokyo, designed by Pritzker Prize-winning architect Ryue Nishizawa.

== Synopsis ==
The film immerses viewers in the daily life of Yasuo Moriyama, an urban hermit who lives surrounded by books, music, and nature in a series of interconnected pavilions that form his home. Nishizawa's design prioritizes simplicity, openness, and a seamless connection to the environment, making the house both a meditative and practical space. The documentary eschews traditional architectural analysis, focusing instead on the sensory and human experiences within the space—the rustling of leaves, the interplay of light, and the rhythms of Moriyama's solitary yet vibrant life.

== Background and themes ==
Moriyama-San continues Bêka & Lemoine's innovative approach to architectural filmmaking, which emphasizes lived experiences over formal critiques. By focusing on Moriyama's everyday routines, the film explores themes of urban solitude, minimalism, and the interplay between architecture and personal identity. The directors' subtle, observational style allows the architecture to emerge as a character in its own right, shaping and being shaped by its inhabitant.

== Reception ==
The film received widespread acclaim for its unique perspective on architecture and its human-centered narrative. Critics praised its ability to capture the intersection of art, design, and everyday life.

In a review for The Architect's Newspaper, Jack Murphy noted the striking parallels between Moriyama-San and Wim Wenders' later film Perfect Days (2023). Both films share notable similarities in tone, pacing, and the depiction of solitary yet profound lifestyles. Photographic comparisons reveal an uncanny resemblance between the central characters and their environments, further accentuating the thematic and visual connections. This striking overlap has spurred extensive discussions about the influence of Moriyama-San on contemporary cinematic portrayals of architecture, solitude, and daily life.

In an article for ArchDaily, Luca Galofaro further highlighted these similarities, noting how Perfect Days mirrors the essence of Moriyama-San in its portrayal of the protagonist's daily rituals and connection to their environment. Galofaro pointed to the shared themes of solitude, introspection, and the architectural framing of daily life, emphasizing how both films use physical space as a lens to explore personal identity and lifestyle. These uncanny parallels, including the resemblance in character names, have led to ongoing discussions about the extent of Moriyama-San's influence on Wenders' film.

== Legacy ==
Moriyama-San is part of Bêka & Lemoine's broader body of work, which challenges conventional representations of architecture by emphasizing its human and emotional dimensions. The film has been included in the permanent collection of the Museum of Modern Art (MoMA) in New York, solidifying its status as a landmark in both architectural discourse and documentary filmmaking.

== Prizes ==
- Best Prize, London Architecture Film Festival, 2019
- Best Prize, FILAF D'OR, Festival International du Livre d'Art et du Film, Perpignan, 2018
- Best Prize, Arquiteturas Film Festival, Lisbon, 2018
- Best Prize, Arqfilmfest, Santiago, Chile, 2018
- Best Prize, FIFAAC, Bègles, France
