= Angelo Beolco =

Italian actor

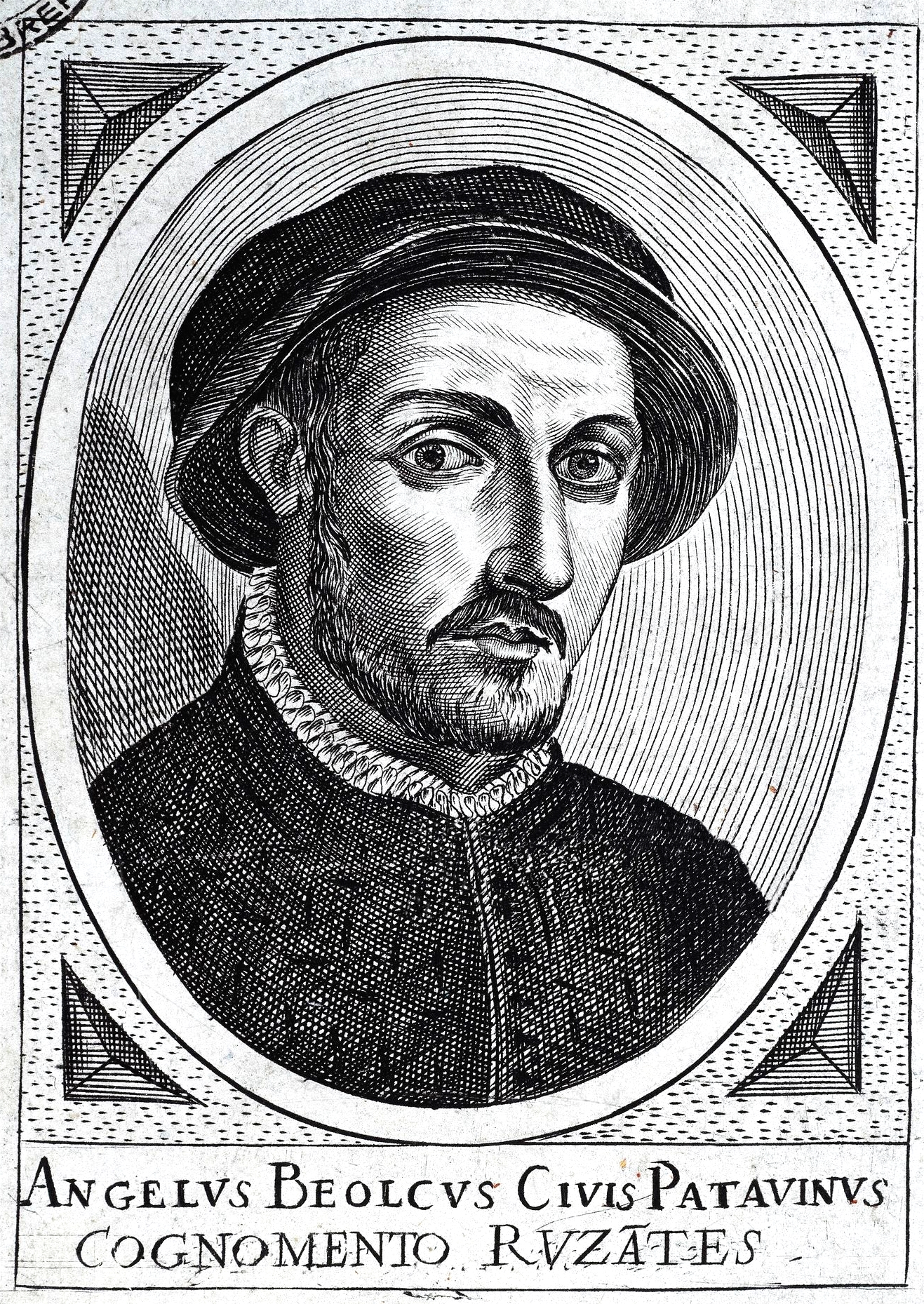
Portrait of Angelo Beolco

Angelo Beolco (c. 1496 – 17 March 1542), better known by the nickname Ruzzante or Ruzante, was a Venetian (Paduan) actor and playwright. He is famous for his rustic comedies, written mostly in the Paduan dialect of the Venetian language, featuring a peasant called "Ruzzante". Those plays paint a vivid picture of Paduan country life in the 16th century.

== Biography ==
Born in Padua, Beolco was the illegitimate son of Giovan Francesco Beolco, a physician who occasionally worked at the University, and a certain Maria, possibly a maid. (It has been suggested, however, that his real name was Ruzzante, and that Beolco was a local corruption of bifolco, meaning "ploughman" — by extension, "country simpleton".) Some claim that he was born in Pernumia, a small town near Padua.

Angelo was raised in his father's household, and there he received a good education. After Giovan Francesco's death in 1524, Angelo became manager of the family's estate, and later (1529) also of the farm of Alvise Cornaro, a nobleman who had retired to the Paduan countryside and who became his friend and protector.

He developed his theatrical vocation by associating with contemporary Padua intellectuals, such as Pietro Bembo and Sperone Speroni. His first stints as an author and actor may have been mariazi, impromptu sketches delivered at marriage parties. In 1520, already known as il Ruzzante, he played a role in a peasant play at the Foscari Palace in Venice. Soon afterwards, he put together his own theatre troupe. His plays were staged first at Ferrara (1529–1532) and then at Padua, in Cornaro's residence.

He died in Padua in 1542, while preparing to stage Speroni's play Canace, for the Accademia degli Infiammati. In spite of his success as an actor, he was very poor through most of his life. His friend Speroni remarked that while Angelo had an unsurpassed understanding of comedy, he was unable to perceive his own tragedy.

== His work ==
In his first printed play, La Pastoral, labelled "a rural comedy", he contrasts Arcadian shepherds who tell of their frustrated loves in affected tercets, with the peasants Ruzzante and Zilio, who deliver rustic verses in Venetian, generously spiced with vulgarities and obscenities (starting with Ruzzante's very first word in the play). Much of the play's comical effect comes from the contrast between the two languages, which provides the occasion for many misunderstandings and wordplay. Featured is also a physician, who earns the gratitude of Ruzzante for prescribing a fatal medicine to his stingy father and thus uniting the lad with his long-awaited inheritance.

In his later plays and monologues, he shifts to the Venetian language almost exclusively, while keeping up with his social satire. In the Oratione, a welcome speech for Bishop Marco Cornaro, he suggests several measures that the new prelate should consider for improving the peasants' lives, such as either castrating the priests or forcing them to marry — for the peace of mind of the local men and their wives.

Because of his "lascivious" themes and abundant use of "very dirty words" (in the evaluation of his contemporary critics), Beolco's plays were often considered unfit for educated audiences, and sometimes led to performances being cancelled. On the other hand, his plays seem to have been well received by those rural nobles who had opposed the metropolitan nobility of Venice in the Cambraic Wars. Perhaps for that reason, none of his plays was staged at Venice after 1526.

One of his best-known pieces is the short dialogue Il Parlamento de Ruzante, where the character tells of his return from the Venetian war front, only to find that he had lost his wife, land, and honour. Again, Ruzante's speech begins with his favourite expletive: Cancaro ai campi e à la guera e ai soldè, e ai soldè e à la guera! ("Rotten be the front and the war and the soldiers, and the soldiers and the war!")

Modern studies have concluded that Ruzzante's speech was not a linguistically accurate record of the local Paduan dialect of Venetian, but was to some extent a "theatrical dialect" created by Beolco himself.

Italian playwright and 1997 Nobel laureate Dario Fo puts Ruzzante on the same level as Molière, claiming that he is the true father of the Venetian comic theatre (Commedia dell'Arte) and the most significant influence on his own work.

== Plays and monologues ==
- La Pastoral (1518–1520)
- La Betia (1524–1525)
- Bilora (pre-1528)
- I Dialoghi (1528–1529)
- Il Parlamento de Ruzante che iera vegnú de campo (1529–1530)
- La Moscheta (1529)
- La Fiorina (1531–1532)
- La Piovana (1532)
- La Vaccaria (1533)
- Oratione
- L'Anconitana (Beolco's play) (1533-1534)
