= Members of the European Parliament (1999–2004) =

This is a list giving breakdowns of the European Parliamentary session from 1999 to 2004.

== MEPs ==
- List of members of the European Parliament for Austria, 1999–2004
- List of members of the European Parliament for Belgium, 1999–2004
- List of members of the European Parliament for Denmark, 1999–2004
- List of members of the European Parliament for Finland, 1999–2004
- List of members of the European Parliament for France, 1999–2004
- List of members of the European Parliament for Germany, 1999–2004
- List of members of the European Parliament for Greece, 1999–2004
- List of members of the European Parliament for Ireland, 1999–2004
- List of members of the European Parliament for Italy, 1999–2004
- List of members of the European Parliament for Luxembourg, 1999–2004
- List of members of the European Parliament for the Netherlands, 1999–2004
- List of members of the European Parliament for Poland, 2004
- List of members of the European Parliament for Portugal, 1999–2004
- List of members of the European Parliament for Spain, 1999–2004
- List of members of the European Parliament for Sweden, 1999–2004
- List of members of the European Parliament for the United Kingdom, 1999–2004

== Observers ==
- Observers for Cyprus 2003–2004
- Observers for the Czech Republic 2003–2004
- Observers for Estonia 2003–2004
- Observers for Hungary 2003–2004
- Observers for Latvia 2003–2004
- Observers for Lithuania 2003–2004
- Observers for Malta 2003–2004
- Observers for Poland 2003–2004
- Observers for Slovakia 2003–2004
- Observers for Slovenia 2003–2004

== See also ==
- Member of the European Parliament
- List of members of the European Parliament 1999–2004
- 1999 European Parliament election
