= List of observers to the European Parliament =

List of observers to the European Parliament may refer to:

- List of observers to the European Parliament for East Germany, 1991–1994
- List of observers to the European Parliament for Estonia, 2003–2004
- List of observers to the European Parliament for Slovakia, 2003–2004
- List of observers to the European Parliament for Hungary, 2003–2004
- List of observers to the European Parliament for Slovenia, 2003–2004
- List of observers to the European Parliament for Latvia, 2003–2004
- List of observers to the European Parliament for Cyprus, 2003–2004
- List of observers to the European Parliament for Malta, 2003–2004
- List of observers to the European Parliament for Lithuania, 2003–2004
- List of observers to the European Parliament for Poland, 2003–2004
- List of observers to the European Parliament for the Czech Republic, 2003–2004
- List of observers to the European Parliament for Bulgaria, 2005–2006
- List of observers to the European Parliament for Romania, 2005–2006
- List of observers to the European Parliament for Croatia, 2012–2013
