= Museum of Polish Diplomacy and Refugees in Bydgoszcz =

Museum, Bydgoszcz, Poland

Coordinates: 53.1257°N 17.9945°E

- Muzeum Dyplomacji i Uchodźstwa Polskiego w Bydgoszczy
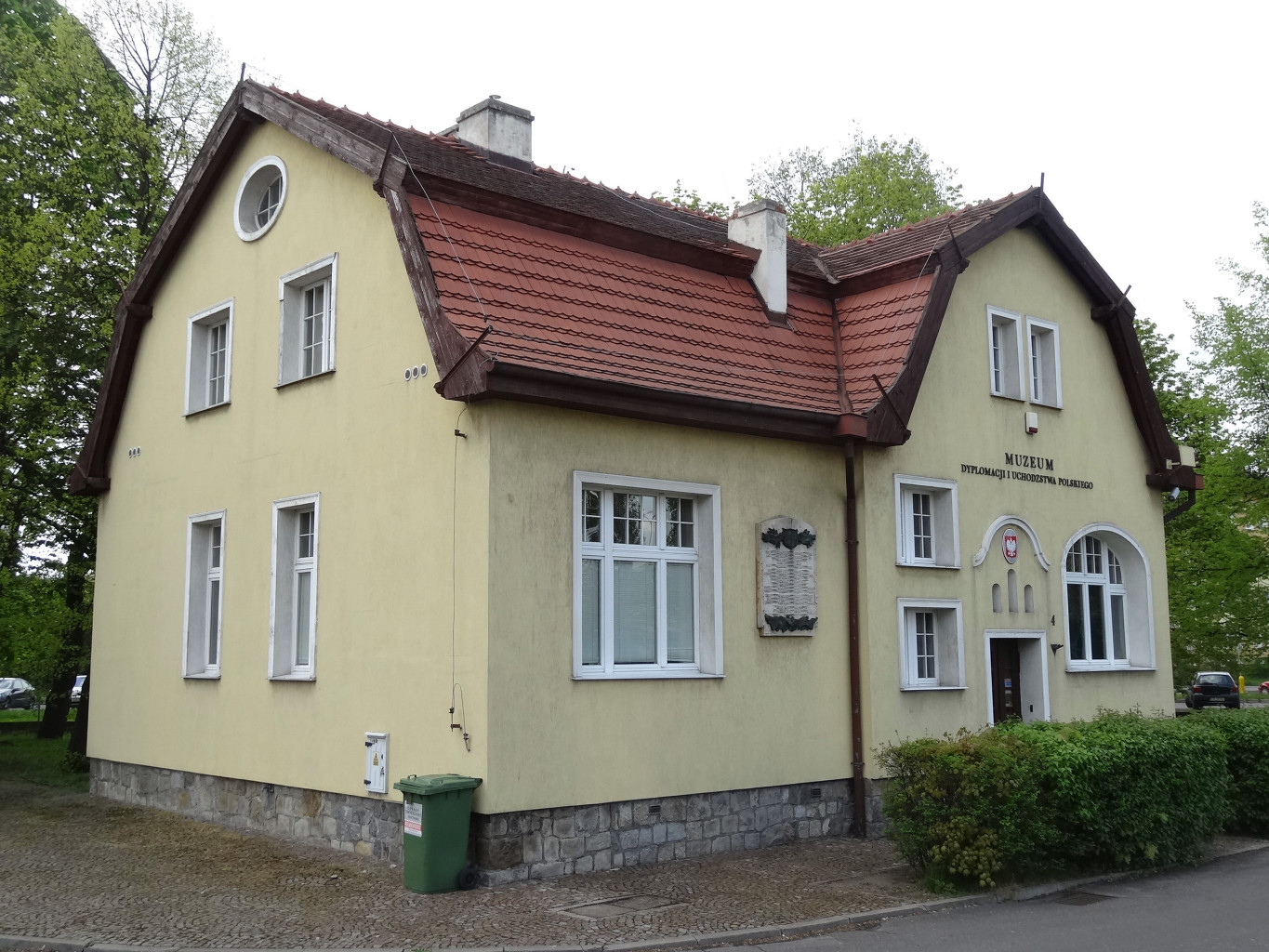
- Building of the museum
- Established: 2 June 1999
- Location: 4 Berwińskiego street, Bydgoszcz, Poland
- Founder: City of Bydgoszcz
- Website: (in Polish) Museum of Polish Diplomacy and Refugees

The Museum of Polish Diplomacy and Exile presents the history of diplomacy and the history of the Polish government-in-exile in London (1939–1990). Located in Bydgoszcz, it is the only of its kind in Poland.

== History ==
In the late 1990s, Wanda Poznańska, the widow of Karol Poznański (1893–1971), the last Consul of the Second Polish Republic in Paris (1927–1934) and London (1934–1945), decided to donate her archives to the then Higher School of Pedagogy in Bydgoszcz. Wanda (1898–2003) had been living since the 1970s in Canada, and her collection contained archives of the Polish diplomatic service and the government in exile, family mementos, furniture, everyday objects and even paintings that once filled the Poznańskis' house.

This move was facilitated by Adam Sudoł, a history professor at Kazimierz Wielki University (KWU) in Bydgoszcz, who was in contact with Wanda Poznańska.

In October 1997, an official delegation went to Montreal to present Wanda Poznańska with the medal Za Zasługi dla Miasta Bydgoszczy (For Services to the City of Bydgoszcz). At the same time, several Polish emigrants donated their archives: books, memorabilia, military and diplomatic uniforms.

In 1998, the City Council of Bydgoszcz decided to transfer these collections from the UKW storage rooms to a historical villa at 4 Berwińskiego street. This edifice became the current museum, inaugurated on 23 June 1998. Its first director was professor Adam Sudoł: the house had to undergo necessary renovation works, completed on 2 June 1999, in order to be opened for the public.

The Minister of Foreign Affairs of the Republic of Poland took responsibility of the honorary patronage of the institution, informing every Polish embassy about it. Thanks to this, more donations began to flow in Bydgoszcz, from Poles living in various countries.

The museum is an independent research institution from the Faculty of History of the KWU, serving the Bydgoszcz city, the Kuyavian–Pomeranian Voivodeship and Poland, as well as the Polish diaspora abroad.

== Karol and Wanda Poznański ==
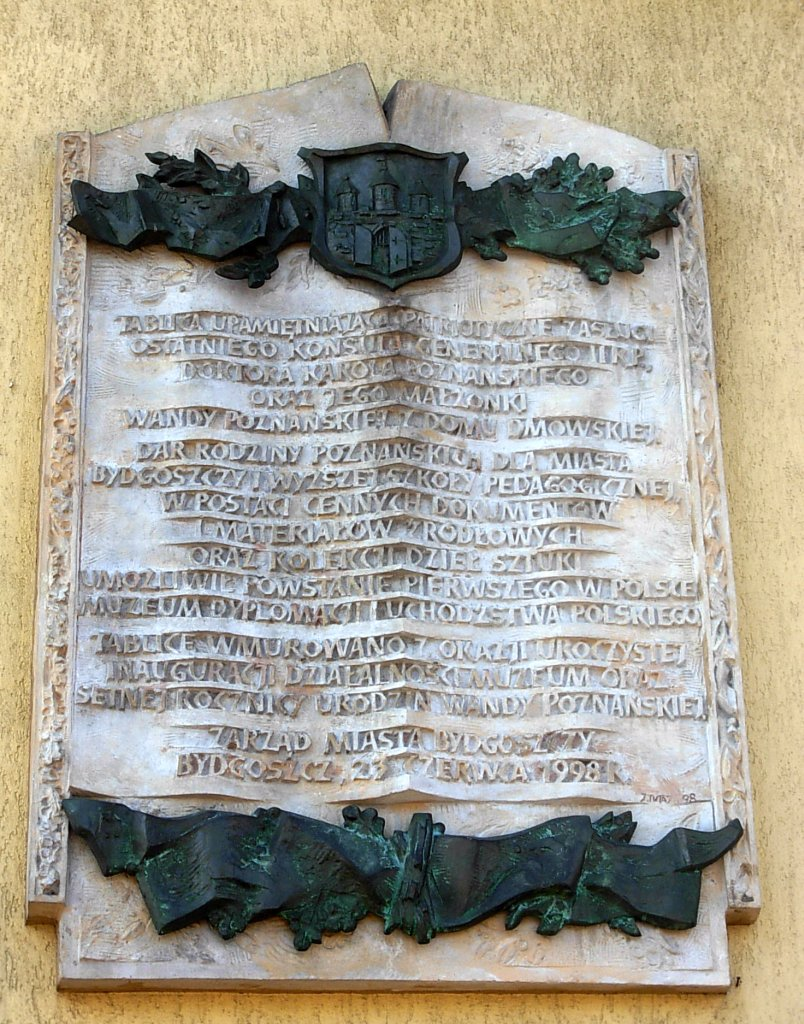
Commemorative plaque unveiled for the inauguration of the museum and the 100th birthday of Wanda Poznański

Karol Poznański began his career in 1920, when he took part in the negotiations that ended the Polish–Soviet War by the signing of the Treaty of Riga on 18 March 1921. From 1927 to 1934, he was Consul General of the Second Polish Republic in Paris and moved to London in 1934. His diplomatic mission ended on 5 July 1945, when United Kingdom and other Allies recognized the Polish Provisional Government: this decision meant immediately the withdrawal of the recognition of the Polish government-in-exile in London. At that time, most of the Polish diplomats chose to stay in UK, becoming political emigrants.

Wanda Poznańska née Dmowska was born on 23 July 1898. She had a thorough education and knew several foreign languages: her knowledge in German allowed her to work for the national parliament after Poland regained independence in 1920. She personally knew Józef Piłsudski and most of the main politicians of that period.

Wanda took part in important diplomatic events, first as a shorthand practitioner and later as a counselor. As a matter of fact, she attended the negotiations leading to the signing of the Treaty of Riga (1921), like Karol Poznański. She also participated in the economic conference in Genoa (1922) as a member of the Polish delegation, serving as a personal secretary to Minister Gabriel Narutowicz and as a stenographer for the Polish delegation. After the assassination of Gabriel Narutowicz, she was tasked with writing the transcript of the trial of the murderer.

In 1940, Wanda moved to Canada aboard a warship and in 1944, together with her mother and daughter, she rejoined her husband in United Kingdom. The latter was still working there as Consul General of the Second Polish Republic. After 1945, the couple emigrated to Montreal in Canada, where they spent the rest of their lives.

Wanda Poznańska died on 4 June 2003, in Montreal. According to her will, she was buried in Bydgoszcz.

== Permanent collections ==
The museum's main resource relies on the "Poznański Family Archive" which contains original documents:

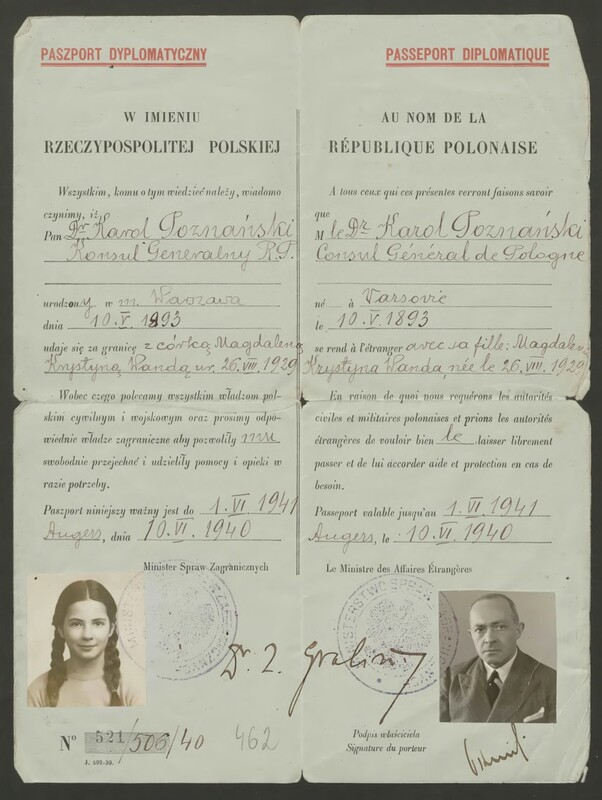
Diplomatic passport of Karol Poznański, Consul General of the Republic of Poland, and his daughter Magdalena

- photographs;
- official and private correspondence;
- manuscripts;
- wills of prominent Poles;
- a collection of engravings by Stefan Mrożewski;
- a collection of Polish banknotes from the interwar period.

In addition, the museum acquired other repositories, including:

- unique documents belonging to Józef Beck, the last minister of Foreign Affairs of Poland of the Second Polish Republic. They have been transferred from USA by the diplomat's son Andrzej Beck;
- mementos of Tadeusz Skowroński (1896–1986), a Polish diplomat and essayist. He was the Minister Plenipotentiary of Poland to Brazil from 1938 to 1945. His archives come from the Skowroński family estate in Torzeniec and from the diplomatic missions where he worked;
- memorabilia from Kazimierz Duchowski (1936–2021), a Polish official and diplomat, Polish ambassador to Costa Rica (1991–1995) and Cambodia (2002–2005);
- archives concerning the history of the Polish people's movement in United States and Belgium;
- historical uniforms, military decorations and medals;
- a collection of banners and flags;
- a unique set of Meissen china.

After the death of Wanda Poznańska in 2003, the museum received, as a legacy, furniture and paintings (works by Rembrandt, Wyspiański, Julian Fałat, Olga Boznańska, Wojciech Gerson, Leopold Gottlieb, Leon Wyczółkowski).

In 2008, during the AutografExpo exhibition at the museum, organised for the 10th anniversary of the creation of the Kuyavian–Pomeranian Voivodeship, a symbolic document called the Act of Unity (Akt Jedności) was signed. The signatories were at the time:

- Piotr Całbecki, marshal of the Kuyavian–Pomeranian Voivodeship;
- Rafał Bruski, voivode of the Kuyavian–Pomeranian Voivodeship;
- Konstanty Dombrowicz, president of Bydgoszcz;
- Oleksandr Motsyk, ambassador of Ukraine to Poland;
- Jerzy Kulej, guest of honour;
- Adam Sudoł, director of the museum;
- Jarosław Pijarowski and diverse authorities of the city of Bydgoszcz.

In 2014, Radosław Sikorski, then Polish minister of Foreign Affairs, gave to the museum a unique silence cabin. This intriguing exhibit, made in Soviet Union, used to be located at the Polish Consulate General in Cologne to conduct top secret talks. It is the only facility of this type displayed in a civilian museum.

The museum's collection currently includes over four thousand objects.

== Exhibitions ==
The museum organizes regularly permanent and temporary exhibitions. Most significant ones included:

- History of Polish diplomacy after 1918 (Dzieje dyplomacji polskiej po 1918 roku) and History of Polish exile after 1918 (Dzieje uchodźstwa polskiego po 1918), 2001;
- 55 years of Polish Scouting Association abroad (55 lat działalności Związku Harcerstwa Polskiego poza granicami kraju), 2001;
- Cursed soldiers (Żołnierze wyklęci) - a documentary exhibition presenting the fate of the anti-communist underground in Polish lands after 1944, 2002.
- Sovietization and de-polonization of Eastern Borderlands in the Second Polish Republic (Sowietyzacja i depolonizacja Kresów Wschodnich II Rzeczypospolitej), 2003;
- Stanisław Mikołajczyk and Wincenty Witos - Life and Activity (Stanisław Mikołajczyk and Wincenty Witos - Życie i działalnośċ), 2005;
- Autograf Expo National Exhibition of Contemporary Autographs (Autograf Expo Ogólnopolska Wystawa Współczesnych Autografów), 2008;
- Donation of Wanda Poznańska (Ekspozycja poświęcona darowiźnie Wandy Poznańskiej) - August 2018, permanent exhibition;
- Memorabilia of Polish emigrants (Wystawa pamiątek polskich emigrantów) - August 2018, permanent exhibition;
- Mariusz Kałdowski "Panorama of the Perfect Time (Mariusz Kałdowski "Panorama czasu dokonanego") - August 2022.

== Activities ==
The facility regularly hosts scientific conferences, meetings of the Polish diaspora, lectures and history olympiads. Researchers, students, and journalists use the museum archives in their work. The Museum of Polish Diplomacy and Refugees closely cooperates with the Association "Polish Community" (Wspólnota Polska), which used to be involved in helping Poles living in the former Soviet Union, as well as with the Society of Friends of Vilnius and the Vilnius Land, which resulted in the set up of a Regional Research Center - Department of the North-Eastern Borderlands.

In March 2002, the museum hosted the World Council for Research on Polonia, supported by Prof. Dr. Edward Szczepanik.

== Honorary curators of the Museum ==
- Henri Musielak – France
- Dorota Guczalska – USA
- Ryszard Ciskowski – USA
- Feliks Rembiałkowski – USA
- Zuzanna Pankanin – France
- Marian Dąbrowski – United Kingdom
- Roman Lewicki – United Kingdom
- World Association of Bydgoszcz Inhabitants
- Dorota Kempka – Poland
- Lech Różycki – Poland
- Arkadiusz Jawień – Poland
- Margaret Anne Adamson – Australia
- Mariusz Kałdowski – United Kingdom
- Waldemar Serocki – Poland
- Jarosław Pijarowski – Poland
- Radosław Sikorski – Poland

== Museum building ==
1911-1914

Eclecticism

The villa had been erected in the mid-1910s on a plot criss-crossed by railtracks leading to the city slaughterhouse which opened in 1890, along today's Jagiellońska Street.

The first street was laid out in the late 1920s: it was then named Ulica Księza Misjonarzy (Missionary Priests Street), in reference to the priests of the Congregation of the Missionaries of St. Vincent de Paul who settled in the vicinity in 1923, in order to erect the future Saint Vincent de Paul Basilica. The large plot of land for the building had been offered by Bydgoszcz municipal authorities the same year. The house was then inhabited by priests till the outbreak of WWII.

After the war, the edifice housed the administrative offices of Centrostal, a local branch of a nationalized metallurgy factory. The production halls were razed in the late 2010s. The area moved to the hands of the Kazimierz Wielki University in Bydgoszcz (Uniwersytet Kazimierza Wielkiego w Bydgoszczy-UKW) afterwards.

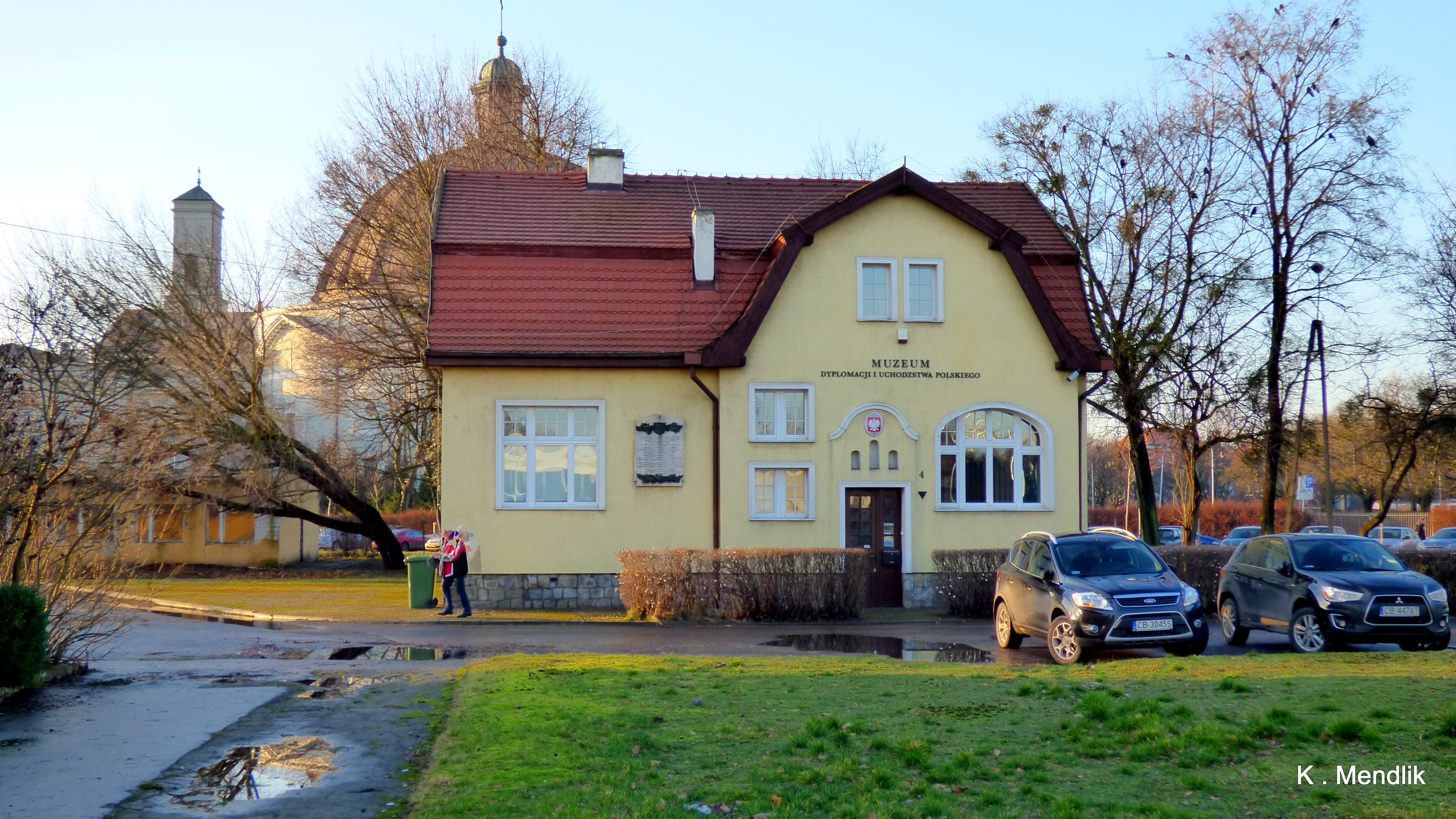
The museum building, in the backdrop the Saint Vincent de Paul Basilica

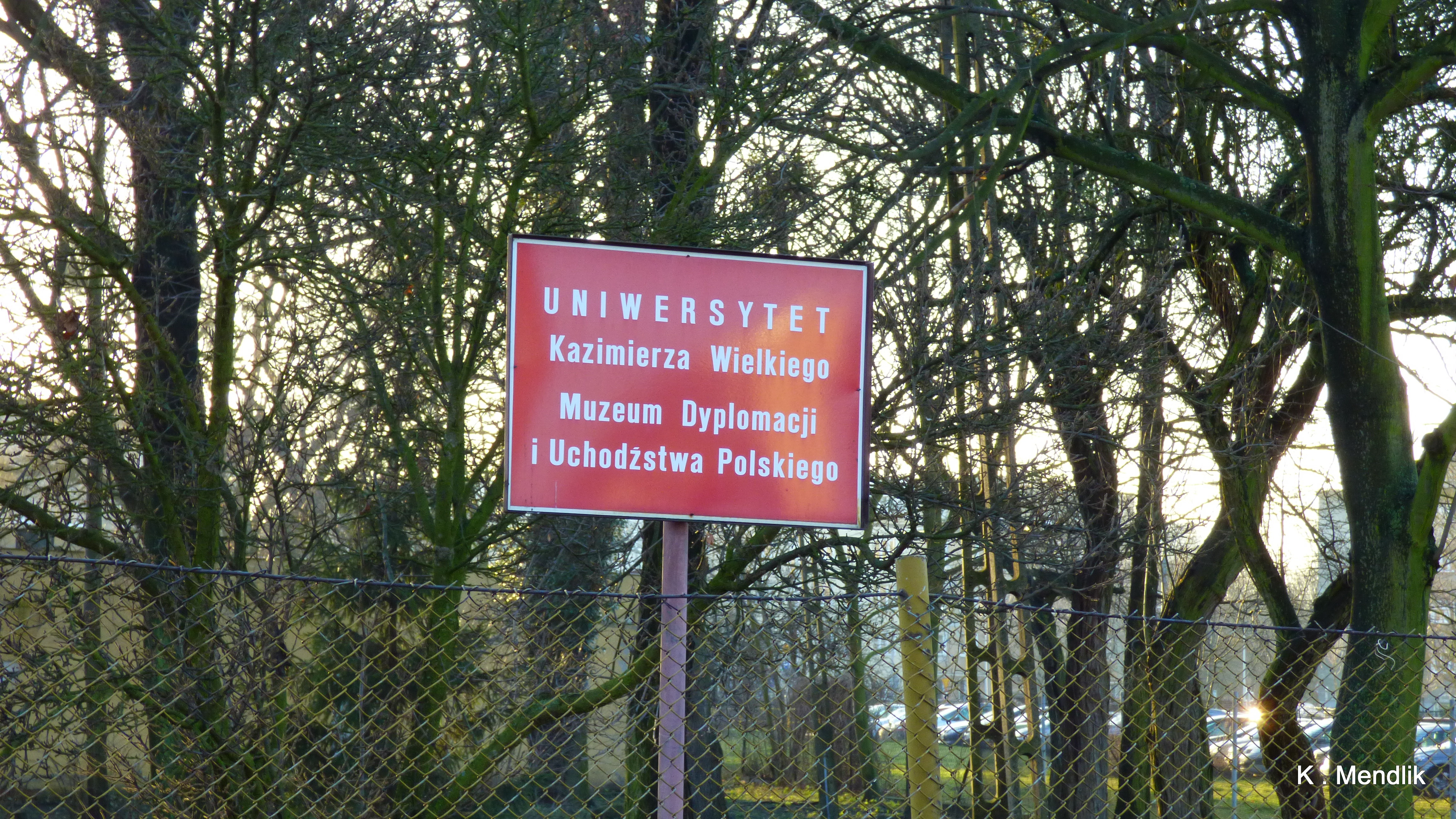
Plot owned by the UKW

== See also ==
- Bydgoszcz
- Saint Vincent de Paul Basilica, Bydgoszcz
- Kazimierz Wielki University in Bydgoszcz
- Polish diaspora
- Diplomacy
- Polish diaspora

== Bibliography ==
- Sudoł, Adam (1998). Karol Poznański. Ostatni konsul generalny w II Rzeczypospolitej [Karol Poznański. The last consul general in the Second Polish Republic.] (in Polish). Bydgoszcz-Toruń: Wydawnictwo Uczelniane WSP w Bydgoszczy. p. 386.
- Sudoł, Adam; Horoszczuk, Magda (2004). Muzeum Dyplomacji i Uchodźstwa Polskiego. Kalendarz Bydgoski [Museum of Polish Diplomacy and Exile. Bydgoszcz Calendar] (in Polish). Bydgoszcz: Towarzystwo Miłośników Miasta Bydgoszczy. pp. 121–124.
