= Konstanty Dombrowicz =

Polish journalist and politician

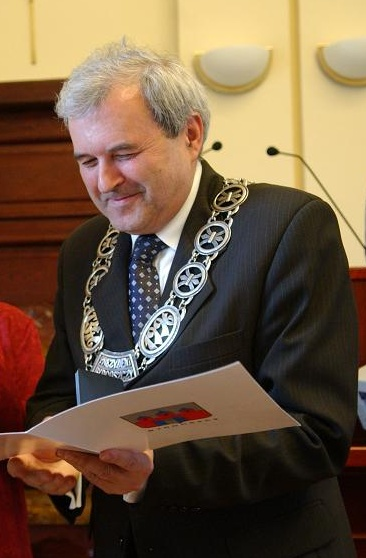

President (Mayor) of Bydgoszcz
- In office 20 November 2002 – 2010
- Deputy: Lucyna Kojder-Szweda; Bolesław Grygorewicz; Rafał Bruski; Wojciech Nowacki
- Preceded by: Roman Jasiakiewicz
- Succeeded by: Rafał Bruski(2010)

Personal details
- Born: 4 September 1947 (age 78) Ludowice, Poland
- Spouse: Maria Dombrowicz
- Profession: Forensic sceinentist

Konstanty Dombrowicz (born 4 September 1947) is a Polish journalist and politician who was the President of Bydgoszcz (from 2002 to 2010).

== Early life and education ==
Konstanty Dombrowicz was born on 4 September 1947 in Ludowice, Poland. Ludowice is a village in Wąbrzeźno County, Kuyavian-Pomeranian Voivodeship.

In 1972 he graduated Nicolaus Copernicus University in Toruń and have an M.A. degree in Polish philology studies. In 1975 he graduated journalist course, which was organized by Polish Journalists Association (Stowarzyszenie Dziennikarzy Polskich). He was student of administration, e.g. in Federal Academy of Public Administration in Vienna (www), Centre National de la Fonction Publique Territoriale in Paris (www) and European Institute in Łódź (www).

== Journalist career ==
He worked as journalist for Polish Radio in Koszalin (1972) and in Bydgoszcz (1972-1983). Next he worked for TVP 3 Gdańsk (1984-1990) and collaborated with Bydgoszcz local newspapers.

He was an initiator and co-author of the regional television TVP 3 Bydgoszcz - he was a first Chief of TVP3 Bydgoszcz (1990-1993). Between 1994 and 1999 he worked in City Office as Chief of Bureau of Executive Committee and as Press Spokesperson. In 1999 he was a Chief of Press Bureau and co-originator of pastoral visits of Pope John Paul II in Bydgoszcz on 7 June.

Between 1999 and 2002 he worked in Voivodeship Office in Bydgoszcz as Deputy of Chief - and next as a Chief - of Information, Promotion and European Integration Department. He was a Voivodeship Governor Press Spokesperson.

== Political career ==
=== Presidential election of 2002 ===
In Polish local elections in 2002 he was candidate of Bydgoszcz Civic Agreement Committee (Bydgoskie Porozumienie Obywatelskie) for President (=Mayor) of Bydgoszcz. He was supported by Civic Platform.

On 27 October 2002 he received 15,560 votes (19.01%) and came second in the First Ballot; won being at the Office president Roman Jasiakiewicz (44.82%). On 10 November in Second Ballot Dombrowicz won with 44,263 votes (54.62%).

He took Office on 20 November 2002.

=== Presidential election of 2006 ===
In Polish local elections in 2006 he was Independent candidate for President of Bydgoszcz.

On 12 November 2006 he received 34,088 votes (30.69%) and won in the First Ballot. On 26 November, in the Second Ballot, Dombrowicz won with 51,112 votes (53.79%) with Roman Jasiakiewicz (46.21%).

His second term began on 6 December 2006.

== Personal life ==
Konstanty Dombrowicz is married with Maria Dombrowicz. She is working in Geography Institute in Kazimierz Wielki University in Bydgoszcz. They have two children, a daughter Maria, Jr (born 1974), and a son Konstanty Adam (born 29 May 1978). In 2009 European Parliament election Konstanty Adam was a candidate of Civic Platform from Kuyavian-Pomeranian constituency.

== Electoral history ==
Bydgoszcz Presidential election, 2002
Party	Candidate	Votes	%	±%
Democratic Left Alliance-Labor Union	Roman Jasiakiewicz	36,690	44.82	
Independent	Konstanty Dombrowicz	15,560	19.01	
Law and Justice	Kosma Złotowski	8,994	10.99	
League of Polish Families	Ewa Stępień	7,929	9.69	
Independent	Bogdan Dzakanowski	7,359	8.99	
Self-Defense	Zbigniew Pałka	3,501	4.28	
Independent	Ireneusz Bielski	1,370	1.67	
Domestic Agreement of Pensioners	Andrzej Skibicki	459	0.56	
Turnout		83,323	28.23	

Bydgoszcz Presidential election, 2002
Party	Candidate	Votes	%	±%
Independent	Konstanty Dombrowicz	44,263	54.62	
Democratic Left Alliance-Labor Union	Roman Jasiakiewicz	36,773	45.38	
Turnout		81,709	27.64	

Bydgoszcz Presidential election, 2006
Party	Candidate	Votes	%	±%
Independent	Konstanty Dombrowicz	34,088	30.69	+11.68
Independent	Roman Jasiakiewicz	29,768	26,80	−18.02
Civic Platform	Teresa Piotrowska	20,617	18.56	
Law and Justice	Andrzej Walkowiak	12,242	11.02	+0,03
Independent	Elżbieta Krzyżanowska	6,992	6.30	
Independent	Jan Rulewski	6,676	6.01	
Self-Defense	Roman Sidorkiewicz	686	0.62	−3.66
Turnout		112,270	38.24	+10.1

Bydgoszcz Presidential election, 2006
Party	Candidate	Votes	%	±%
Independent	Konstanty Dombrowicz	51,112	53.79	−0.83
Independent	Roman Jasiakiewicz	43,905	46.21	+0.83
Turnout		96,173	32.75	+5.11

== See also ==
- List of presidents of Bydgoszcz

Preceded by Roman Jasiakiewicz	President of Bydgoszcz; 20 November 2002 – 2010	Succeeded by Rafał Bruski
Preceded by First	Bydgoszcz order of precedence President of Bydgoszcz (2002-2010)	Succeeded by Chairperson of Bydgoszcz City Council; Felicja Gwincińska (2002-06); Dorota Jakuta (born 2006)
