= Kłopotek =

Kłopotek (Polish: [kwɔˈpɔ.tɛk]) is a Polish surname. Notable people with the surname include:

- Agnieszka Kłopotek (born 1969), a Polish politician and zootechnician
- Eugeniusz Kłopotek (born 1953), a Polish politician and zootechnician
