= Agnieszka Kłopotek =

Polish politician and zootechnician (born 1969)

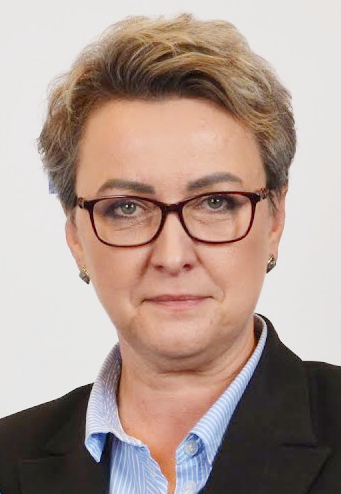
- Kłopotek in 2024

Member of the Sejm of Poland
- Incumbent
- Assumed office 15 October 2023
- Constituency: No. 4

Member of the Kuyavian–Pomeranian Voivodeship Sejmik
- In office 7 November 2014 – 15 October 2023
- Constituency: No. 2

Personal details
- Born: Agnieszka Maria Huk; 9 June 1969 (age 57) Tarnów, Poland
- Party: Polish People's Party
- Other political affiliations: European Coalition (2019)
- Spouse: Eugeniusz Kłopotek
- Children: 2
- Education: Agricultural University of Kraków; Kraków University of Economics; Tadeusz Kościuszko Kraków University of Technology
- Occupation: Politician; Zootechnician

Agnieszka Maria Kłopotek (Polish: [aɡˈɲɛʂ.ka ˈma.rja kwɔˈpɔ.tɛk]; née Huk, Polish: [ˈxuk]; born 9 July 1969) is a politician and zootechnician. She is a member of the Sejm of Poland since 2023, and was a member of the Kuyavian–Pomeranian Voivodeship Sejmik from 2014 to 2023. She belongs to the Polish People's Party.

== Biography ==
Agnieszka Kłopotek (née Huk) was born on 9 July 1969 in the city of Tarnów, now in Lesser Poland Voivodeship, Poland. In 1995, she graduated from the Agricultural University of Kraków with a master's degree in zootechnics. She received the postgraduate degrees from the Kraków University of Economics in 1996, and the Tadeusz Kościuszko Kraków University of Technology in 1999, and a doctorate from the National Research Institute of Animal Production in 2004. Since 1998, she has worked for the National Research Institute of Animal Production in the village of Balice in Lesser Poland Voivodeship, currently being part of its Kołuda Wielka division. She is a main specialist of economic, organization, and investment matters.

Kłopotek is a member of the Polish People's Party. In 2014, she was elected to the Kuyavian–Pomeranian Voivodeship Sejmik, in its 2nd constituency, receiving 5,785 votes (5.53%). She was reelected in 2018, receiving 8,745 votes (7.85%). She also served as the deputy chairperson of the Sejmik. She unsuccessfully ran to the European Parliament during the 2019 election, as a candidate of the European Coalition in the constituency no. 2, consisting of Kuyavian–Pomeranian Voivodeship. She received 8,055 votes (1.21%). In 2023, she was elected to the Sejm of Poland from the constituency no. 4, which consists of the western half of Kuyavian–Pomeranian Voivodeship, with 11,049 votes (2.07%). In December 2023, she became a member of the Legality of the Postal Voting in 2020 Presidential Election Committee.

== Personal life ==
Kłopotek is married to politician and zootechnician Eugeniusz Kłopotek, who was a member of the Sejm from 1997 to 2005, and from 2007 to 2019. Together they have two children. She lives in the village of Śliwice in Kuyavian–Pomeranian Voivodeship, Poland.

== Electoral history ==
Electoral history of Agnieszka Kłopotek
Year	Office		Party	Constituency	Votes			Result	Ref.
Year	Office		Party	Constituency	Total	%	P.	Result	Ref.
2014	Kuyavian–Pomeranian Voivodeship Sejmik	5th	Polish People's Party	No. 2	5,785	5.53	5th	Won	
2018	Kuyavian–Pomeranian Voivodeship Sejmik	6th	Polish People's Party	No. 2	8,745	7.85	4th	Won	
2019	European Parliament	9th	European Coalition	No. 2	8,055	1.21	14th	Lost	
2023	Sejm of Poland	10th	Polish People's Party	No. 4	11,049	2.07	14th	Won	
