= Złotowski =

Złotowski is a surname. Notable people with the surname include:

- Kosma Złotowski (born 1964), Polish politician
- Rebecca Zlotowski (born 1980), French film director
