= Grażyna Ciemniak =

Polish politician (born 1948)

Grażyna Jolanta Ciemniak
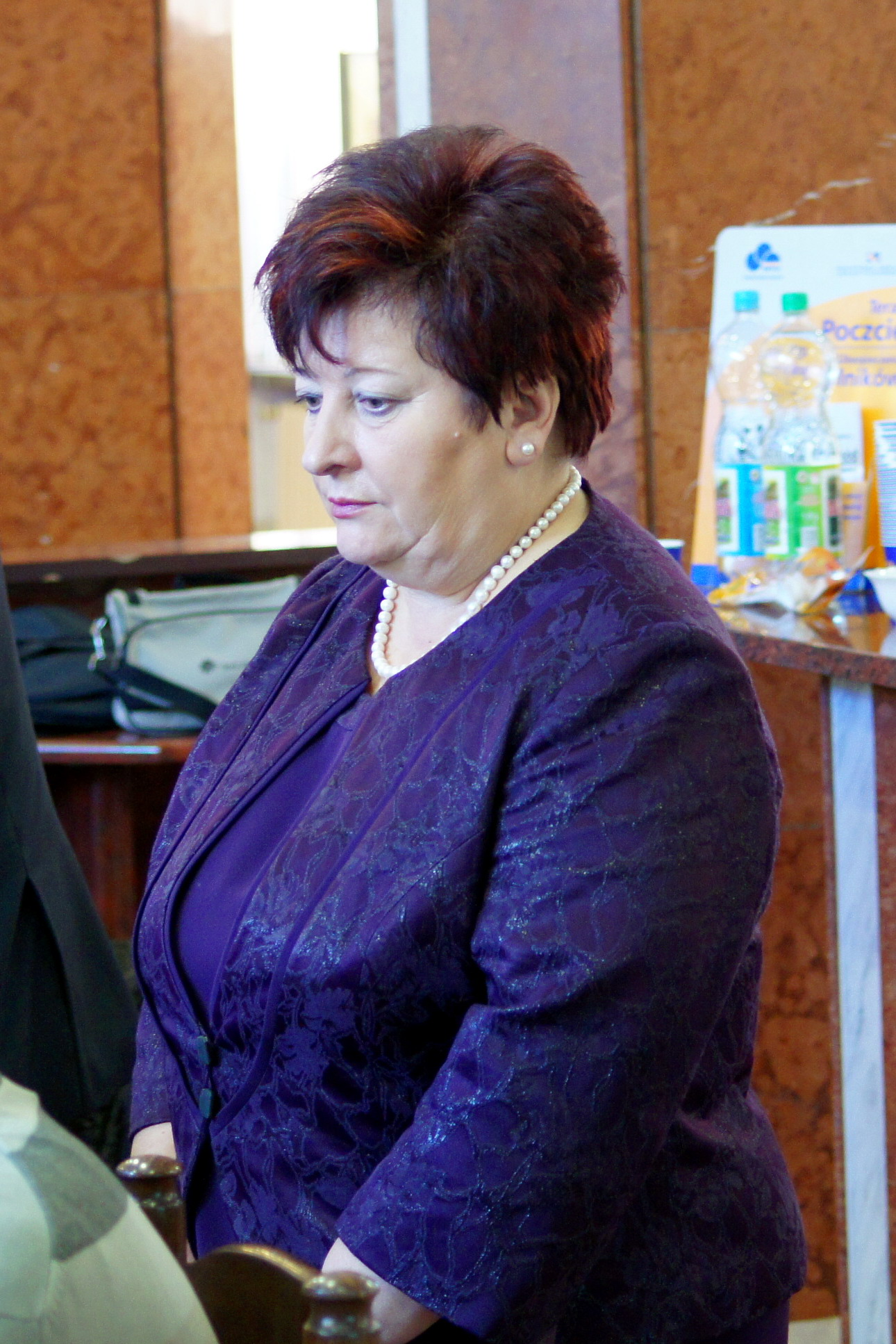
- Ciemniak in 2010

Member of the European Parliament
- In office 1 May 2004 – 19 July 2004

Member of Sejm of Poland
- Incumbent
- Assumed office (IV term) 19 October 2001–18 October 2005 (V term) 19 October 2005–4 November 2007 (VI term) 24 June 2009
- Constituency: 4 Bydgoszcz district

Member of Senate of Poland
- In office (III term) 14 October 1993 – 20 October 1997

Deputy President (Mayor) of Bydgoszcz
- In office 1998–2001

Personal details
- Born: 20 June 1948 (age 77) Toruń, Poland
- Party: Democratic Left Alliance; Social Democracy of Poland

Grażyna Jolanta Ciemniak (born 20 June 1948) is a Polish political figure who has been a member of the Senate of Poland (1993–97) and Deputy President of Bydgoszcz (1998–2001), as well as member of the Sejm of Poland (2001–07, since 2009) and member of the European Parliament (2004).

A native of the northern city of Toruń, the co-capital and assembly location of the Kuyavian-Pomeranian Voivodeship, Grażyna Ciemniak initially gained her Senate seat in the 1993 parliamentary election. While not in the Sejm during its 1997–2001 term, she served, in 1998–2001, as Deputy President of Bydgoszcz, a position subject to election by the Bydgoszcz City Council.

In 2001 Polish parliamentary election, she campaigned for the Sejm IV term from Bydgoszcz district 4 as candidate from the Democratic Left Alliance-Labor Union (SLD-UP) list and was elected with 8,212 votes. Between April 2003 (signed of Treaty of Accession 2003) and 31 April 2004, Grażyna Ciemniak was an observer representing the Sejm in the European Parliament. Between 1 May and 19 July she served as a non-elected member of European Parliament V.

In 2004 European Parliament election she was a candidate of Democratic Left Alliance-Labor Union from Kuyavian-Pomeranian constituency. She polled an insufficient 9,001 votes and was not elected.

In 2005 parliamentary election she was started to the Sejm V Term from 4 Bydgoszcz district. She polled 3,807 votes and was second on the Democratic Left Alliance (SLD) list for the Sejm term which ended in 2007.

In 2007 parliamentary election she campaigned from a Left and Democrats (LiD) list for a chance to serve in Sejm VI, but polled only 3,997 votes and was the first LiD candidate to lose her seat. In June 2009, following Janusz Zemke's win in his bid for a seat in the European Parliament, she succeeded to his seat in the Sejm. She has been a member of Sejm VI Term since 24 June 2009 as Social Democracy of Poland parliamentary club member.

Grażyna Ciemniak's son, Robert (born 1975), is a chess prodigy who has held the title of International Master since 1993.

== See also ==
- Members of the European Parliament for Poland (May–July 2004)
- Members of Polish Sejm 2005–2007
- Members of Polish Sejm 2007–2011
