= Ryszard Bober =

Polish politician (born 1956)

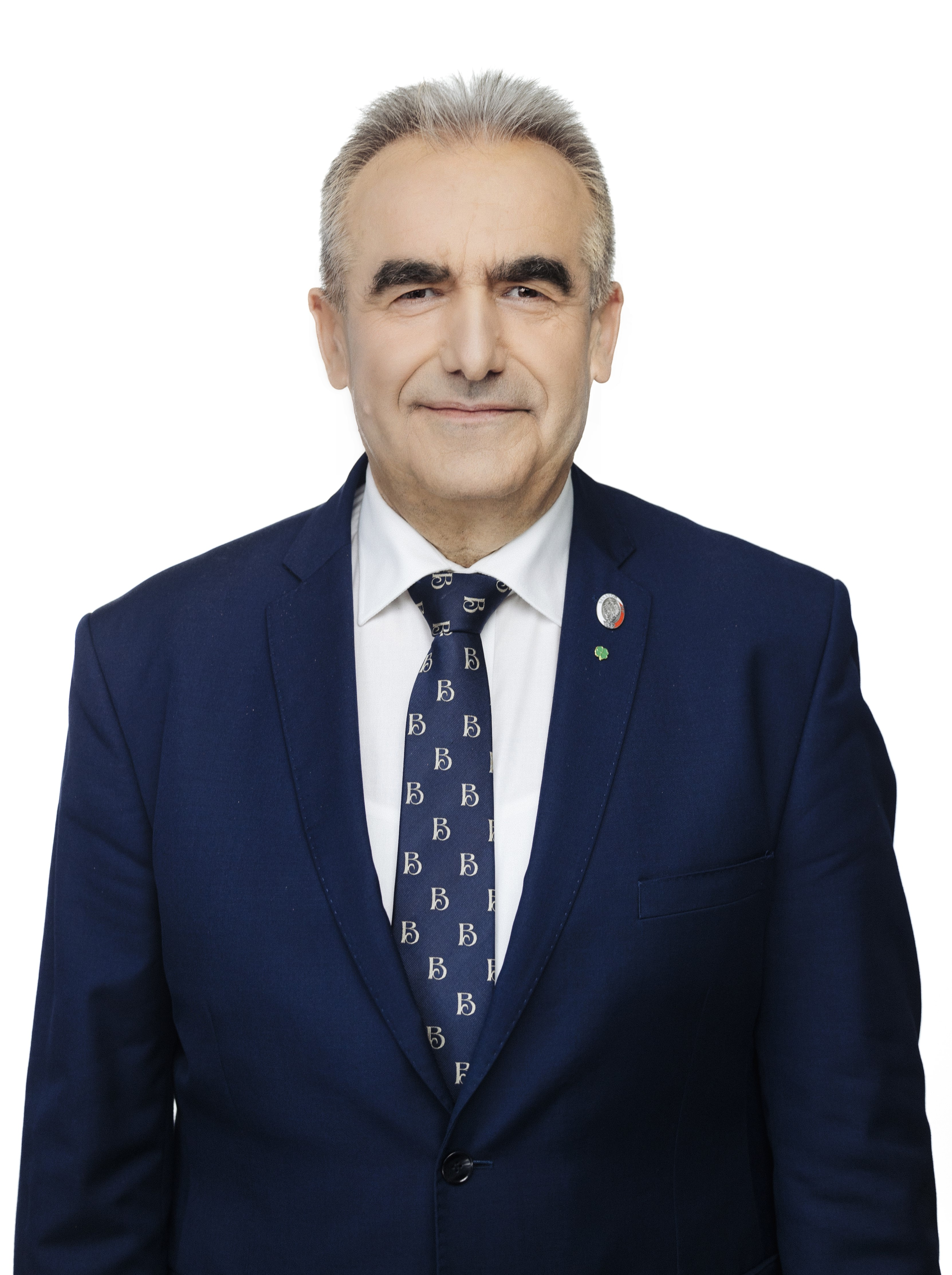

Kuyavian-Pomeranian Regional Assembly Vice-Chairperson
- Incumbent
- Assumed office II term: 26 September 2005 - 27 October 2006; III term: 12 November 2006

Member of Kuyavian-Pomeranian Regional Assembly
- Incumbent
- Assumed office II term: 26 September 2005 - 27 October 2006; III term: 24 November 2006
- Constituency: 3rd district

Personal details
- Born: 1956 (age 69–70) Jabłonowo Pomorskie, Poland
- Party: Polish People's Party
- Spouse: Barbara
- Profession: farmer

Ryszard Jakub Bober (born 1956 in Jabłonowo Pomorskie, Poland) is a Polish politician who is a current Chairperson of Kuyavian-Pomeranian Regional Assembly.

== Biography ==
=== Education ===
He graduated from the University of Agriculture and Technology in Olsztyn (Polish: Akademia Rolniczo-Techniczna w Olsztynie), now University of Warmia and Mazury in Olsztyn.

=== Political career ===
In the 2001 parliamentary election he was a candidate for the Sejm of Poland. He polled 1,274 votes and was not elected from the Polish People's Party list in Toruń parliamentary district.

In the 2002 local election he was a candidate to the Kuyavian-Pomeranian Regional Assembly II term. He polled 3,000 votes in 3rd district. He was second on the Polish People's Party list and was not elected. Zygmunt Kwiatkowski, who was won on the same list, was elected by the Assembly as Vice-Chairperson. Kwiatkowski died in 2005, and Bober take his seat and was elected as Vice-Chairperson on 26 September 2005. The term was end in November 2006.

In the 2006 local election he joined the Regional Assembly III term representing the 3rd district. He scored 5,811 votes, running on the Polish People's Party list. On 24 November 2006 Assembly elected him as Vice-Chairperson of the Assembly (Wiceprzewodniczący Sejmiku Województwa Kujawsko-Pomorskiego).

In the 2007 parliamentary election he was a candidate for the Sejm of Poland. He polled 3,392 votes and was not elected from Polish People's Party list in Toruń parliamentary district.

He was a candidate in the 2009 European Parliament election. He polled 2,705 votes and was not elected from Polish People's Party list in Kuyavian-Pomeranian constituency.

In the 2019 parliament election he was elected to the Senate from 12 district.

== Personal life ==
Ryszard Bober and his wife, Barbara, have two daughters. Barbara is a principal of s

He received:
Golden Cross of Merit in 2005.

== See also ==
- Kuyavian-Pomeranian Regional Assembly
