= Eugeniusz Kłopotek =

Polish politician (born 1953)

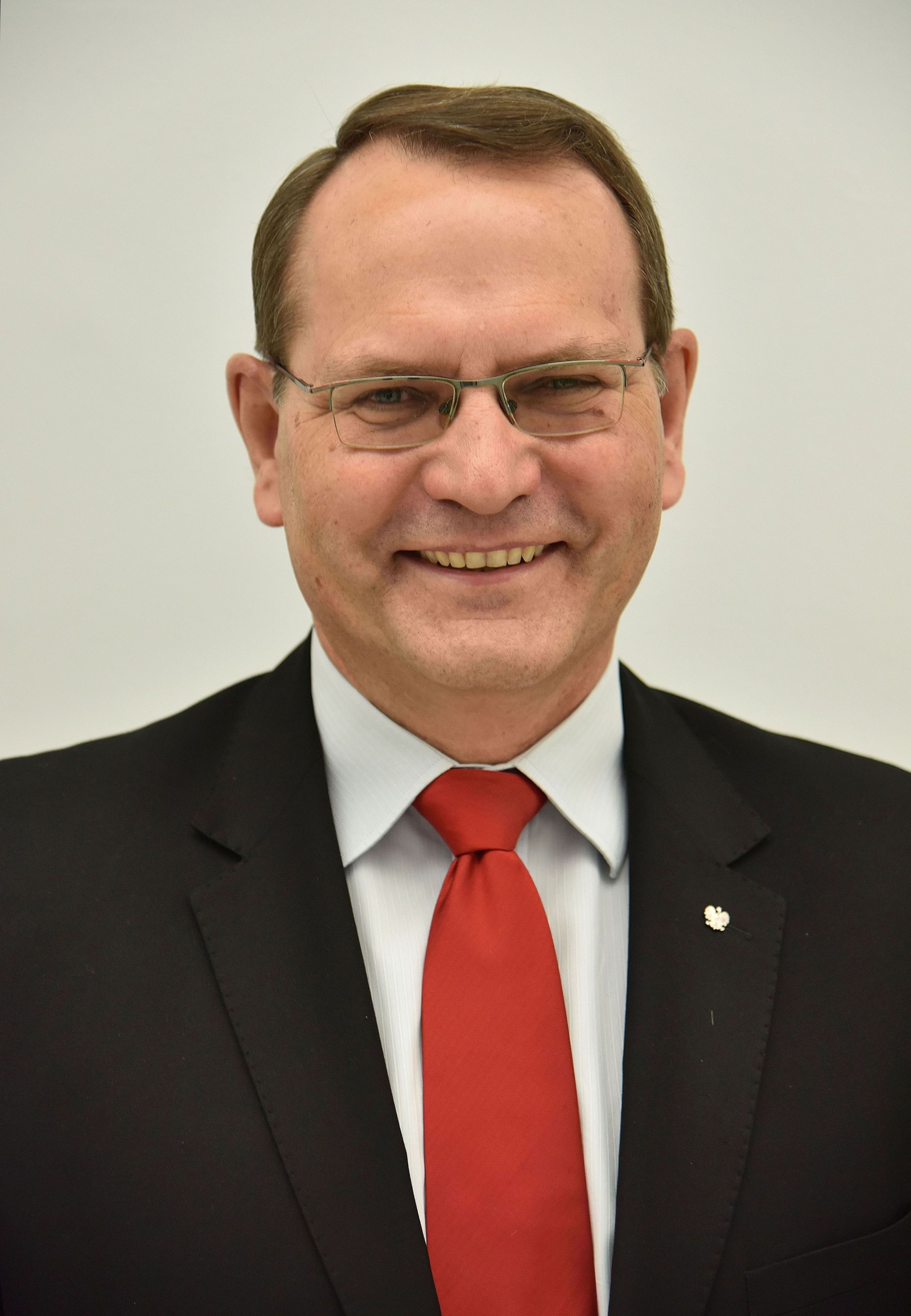

Member of the European Parliament
- In office V term: 2004-05-01 – 2004-07-19

Member of Sejm of Poland
- Incumbent
- Assumed office III term: 1997-10-20 – 2001-10-18; IV term: 2001-10-19 – 2005-10-18; VI term: 2007-11-05
- Constituency: 4 Bydgoszcz district

Member of Kuyavian-Pomeranian Regional Assembly
- In office III term: 2006 – 2007
- Constituency: 2nd district

Personal details
- Born: November 15, 1953 (age 72) Chojnice, Poland
- Party: Polish People's Party
- Spouse: Agnieszka Kłopotek
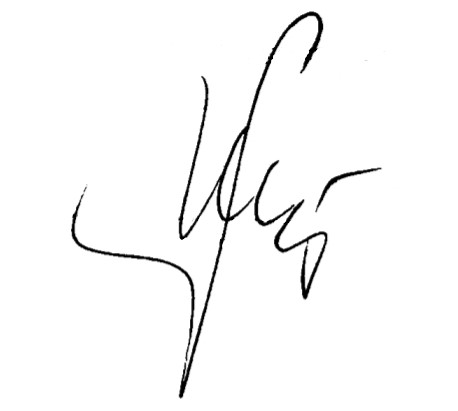
- Signature

Eugeniusz Kłopotek (born 15 November 1953) is a Polish politician who was a member of the Sejm of Poland from 1997 to 2005 and from 2007 to 2019, a, member of the European Parliament in 2004, and member of the Kuyavian–Pomeranian Voivodeship Sejmik from 2006 to 2007.

Between 1982 and 1988 he was a Head of Gmina Warlubie (Polish: Naczelnik Gminy Warlubie); currently Vogt (Wójt). Until 1990, he working in Bydgoszcz Voivodeship Office as vice-director of the Department of Agriculture. Between 1994 and 1997 he was a vice-voivode of Bydgoszcz Voivodeship (Wicewojewoda Bydgoski).

After the 1997 Polish parliamentary election he was elected a member of the Sejm III term.

In 2001 Polish parliamentary election he was started to the Sejm IV Term from 4 Bydgoszcz district. He was the best polled on the Polish People's Party (PSL) list and was elected to the Sejm. Between April 2003 (signed of Treaty of Accession 2003) and 31 April 2004, Eugeniusz Kłopotek was a Sejm' observer in European Parliament. Between 1 May and 19 July he was a not-election Member of the European Parliament V Term.

In 2004 European Parliament election he was a candidate of Polish People's Party from Kuyavian-Pomeranian constituency. He polled 10,850 votes and was not elected.

In 2005 Polish parliamentary election he was started to the Sejm V Term from 4 Bydgoszcz district. He polled 7,006 votes and was first on the Polish People's Party (PSL) list. Kłopotek was not elected. When Zbigniew Sosnowski from 5 Toruń district resign from his seat in the Sejm, new member was Andrzej Kłopotek, Eugeniusz' brother.

In 2006 Polish local election he joined the Kuyavian-Pomeranian Regional Assembly III term representing the 2nd district. He polled 13,857 votes and was first on the Polish People's Party (PSL) list. His term was end, when he was elected to Sejm in 2007.

In 2007 parliamentary election he back to the Sejm of Poland VI term (lower house of the Polish parliament) representing the 4 Bydgoszcz district. He polled 12,975 votes. His brother Andrzej was not elected to the Sejm.

In 2009 European Parliament election he is a candidate of Polish People's Party from Kuyavian-Pomeranian constituency.

== See also ==
- Members of the European Parliament for Poland 2004 (May–July)
- Bydgoszcz
