= Kuyavian-Pomeranian =

- Kuyavian–Pomeranian Voivodeship is one of the 16 voivodeships (provinces) in Poland.
- Kuyavian–Pomeranian (European Parliament constituency) is one of 13 Polish constituencies of the European Parliament.
- Kuyavian–Pomeranian Voivodeship Sejmik is the regional legislature of the voivodeship.
