= Revue d'élevage et de médecine vétérinaire des pays tropicaux =

Revue d’élevage et de médecine vétérinaire des pays tropicaux
- Discipline: Agriculture, agronomy, zootechnics, animal health, economy, food science, biosciences
- Language: French, English, Spanish
- Edited by: Denis Bastianelli, Vincent Porphyre, Philippe Holzmuller

Publication details
- History: 1947–present
- Publisher: CIRAD (France)
- Frequency: continuous
- Open access: Diamond
- License: CC-BY 4.0
- Impact factor: 1.1 (CiteScore Scopus) (2025)

Standard abbreviations
- ISO 4: Rev. élev. méd. vét. pays trop.

Indexing
- ISSN: 0035-1865 (print); 1951-6711 (web)

Links
- Journal homepage; DOI 10.19182/remvt

The Revue d’élevage et de médecine vétérinaire des pays tropicaux is an international peer-reviewed open access Academic journal covering livestock production, the environment, and veterinary medicine in the Mediterranean and tropical regions.

== History ==
The journal was founded by the French Agricultural Research Centre for International Development (CIRAD) in 1947. It succeeded the Recueil de médecine vétérinaire exotique which was published from 1928 to 1940. The journal publishes content both in French or English. Its historical archives have been fully accessible online since 2006, with every individual article published since 1947 available on its website. Since 2023, the journal has adopted a continuous publishing model, where articles and reviews are published immediately upon acceptance and compiled into an annual volume.

== Description ==
The Revue d’élevage et de médecine vétérinaire des pays tropicaux publishes original articles and scientific reviews focusing on livestock production, animal products, animal health and the socio-environmental contexts of farming. Its scope includes all domestic, wildlife, and aquacultural species raised or managed in tropical, sub-tropical and Mediterranean climates. The fields of interest encompass core animal science disciplines, such as physiology, nutrition, genetics, production, reproduction and veterinary science, alongside systemic and holistic approaches, inclusding livestock system analyses, value chain analyses, epidemiological studies and environmental assessments. Published papers fall into five categories:

- Animal health and epidemiology
- Animal production and animal products
- Environments and territories
- Feed resources and feeding
- Livestock farming systems and value chains

== Funding and Distribution ==
Published by CIRAD, the publication operates under a Diamond Open Access model, meaning it is entirely free for both readers and authors, with no article processing charges (APCs).

The journal is indexed by the Directory of Open Access Journals (DOAJ), in compliance with the French National Plan for Open Science. Articles are distributed under a Creative Commons Attribution International 4.0 (CC-BY) license, granting authors unrestricted distribution rights. At the European level, it is registered within the Diamond Discovery Hub (DDH).

It is also indexed in Scopus, where it registered a CiteScore of 1.1 in 2025.
