= Waldemar Achramowicz =

Polish politician (born 1949)

1st Kuyavian-Pomeranian Voivodeship Marshal
- In office 1999-01-01 – 2006-11-24
- Preceded by: None, Office created
- Succeeded by: Piotr Całbecki

Member of Kuyavian-Pomeranian Regional Assembly from 4 district
- Incumbent
- Assumed office 1998

Toruń City Councillors
- In office 1994–1998

Personal details
- Born: October 3, 1949 (age 77) Toruń, Poland
- Party: Democratic Left Alliance
- Spouse: Anna Achramowicz

Waldemar Kazimierz Achramowicz (born 3 November 1949 in Toruń, Poland) is a Polish politician who is a current Member of Kuyavian-Pomeranian Regional Assembly. Between 1999 and 2006 he was Kuyavian-Pomeranian Voivodeship Marshal. He was Toruń City Councillors also (1994–1998).

== Career ==
In the 1998 Polish local election he joined the Regional Assembly for one term, representing the 4th district. Assembly elected him as Voivodeship Marshal (Marszałek Województwa Kujawsko-Pomorskiego), chairperson of the voivodeship executive board.

In 2002 Polish local election he was elected again. He polled 14,652 votes and was first on the Democratic Left Alliance-Labor Union list. Assembly II term elected him as Voivodeship Marshal again.

In the 2006 local election he was elected for the third time. He scored 14,205 votes, running on the Left and Democrats list.

== See also ==
- Kuyavian-Pomeranian Regional Assembly
