= List of observers to the European Parliament for Poland, 2003–2004 =

This is a list of the 54 observers to the European Parliament for Poland in the 1999 to 2004 session. They were appointed by the Polish Parliament as observers from 1 May 2003 until the accession of Poland to the EU on 1 May 2004.

== B ==
- Adam Biela NI LPR
- Adam Bielan UEN PiS

== C ==
- Andrzej Chronowski PPE-DE Senate 2001
- Zbigniew Chrzanowski PPE-DE SKL
- Danuta Ciborowska PSE SLD
- Grażyna Ciemniak PSE SLD
- Zygmunt Cybulski PSE SLD

== D ==
- Bernard Drzęźla PSE SLD

== F ==
- Krzysztof Filipek NI Samoobrona

== G ==
- Piotr Gadzinowski PSE SLD
- Andrzej Gałażewski PPE-DE PO
- Andrzej Gawłowski PSE SLD
- Maciej Giertych NI LPR
- Genowefa Grabowska PSE SDPL
- Zofia Grzebiasz-Nowicka PSE SLD
- Andrzej Grzyb PPE-DE PSL-PBL

== I ==
- Tadeusz Iwiński PSE SLD

== J ==
- Jerzy Jaskiernia PSE SLD

== K ==
- Ryszard Kalisz PSE SLD
- Michał Kamiński UEN PiS
- Bogdan Klich PPE-DE PO
- Eugeniusz Kłopotek PPE-DE PSL-PBL
- Wacław Klukowski NI PSL-PBL
- Bronisława Kowalska PSE SLD
- Józef Kubica PSE SLD

== L ==
- Andrzej Lepper NI Samoobrona
- Janusz Lewandowski PPE-DE PO
- Bogusław Liberadzki PSE SLD
- Marcin Libicki UEN PiS
- Janusz Lisak PSE UP
- Bogusław Litwiniec PSE SLD
- Stanisław Łyżwiński NI Samoobrona

== M ==
- Antoni Macierewicz NI RKN

== P ==
- Agnieszka Pasternak PSE SDPL
- Andrzej Pęczak PSE SLD
- Jerzy Pieniążek PSE SLD
- Bogdan Podgórski PSE SLD
- Jacek Protasiewicz PPE-DE PO
- Sylwia Pusz PSE SDPL

== R ==
- Krzysztof Rutkowski NI FKP

== S ==
- Czesław Siekierski PPE-DE PSL-PBL
- Robert Smoleń PSE SLD
- Jerzy Smorawiński PPE-DE Koło Senatorów
- Aleksander Szczygło UEN PiS

== T ==
- Jan Tomaka PPE-DE PO
- Witold Tomczak NI LPR

== W ==
- Jerzy Wenderlich PSE SLD
- Marek Widuch PSE SLD
- Marek Wikliński PSE SLD
- Małgorzata Winiarczyk-Kossakowska PSE SDPL
- Genowefa Wiśniowska NI Samoobrona
- Edmund Wittbrodt PPE-DE Senate 2001
- Janusz Wojciechowski PPE-DE PSL-PBL

== Z ==
- Marian Żenkiewicz PSE SLD
