= Iwona Karolewska =

Polish politician and civil servant (born 1974)

- Karolewska in 2026.

Member of the Sejm of Poland
- Incumbent
- Assumed office 13 November 2023
- Constituency: No. 4

Member of the Świecie Town Council
- In office 20 November 2018 – 17 October 2023
- Constituency: No. 1

Personal details
- Born: Iwona Schröder; 11 March 1974 (age 52) Lniano, Poland
- Party: Civic Coalition (party; since 2025)
- Other political affiliations: Civic Platform (2024–2025); Independent (2023–2024); Civic Coalition (political alliance; 2023)
- Education: Nicolaus Copernicus University; University of Warsaw; Higher School of Social and Economic Sciences in Gdańsk
- Occupation: Politician, civil servant

Iwona Karolewska (Polish: [iˈvɔ.na ka.rɔˈlɛf.ska]; née Schröder, Polish: [ˈʂrɔ.dɛr], German: [ˈʃʁøː.dɐ]; born 11 March 1974) is a Polish politician and civil servant. Since 2023, she is a member of the Sejm of Poland, representing the constituency no. 4, consisting of the eastern portion of the Kuyavian–Pomeranian Voivodeship. Previously, from 2018 to 2023, Karolewska was a councillor in the town of Świecie in Kuyavian–Pomeranian Voivodeship. She belongs to the Civic Coalition party.

== Biography ==
Iwona Karolewska (née Schröder) was born on 11 March 1974, in the village of Lniano, located in Kuyavian–Pomeranian Voivodeship, Poland. She is a daughter of Ewa and Marian Schröder, and grew up in the villages of Bukowiec and Zalesie Królewskie. Karolewska graduated from the Nicolaus Copernicus University in Toruń, Poland, with master's degrees in administration, received in 2000, and law, received in 2005. Karolewska also received a post-graduate degree in local governance and development from the University of Warsaw in 2006, and the master of business administration degree from the Higher School of Social and Economic Sciences in Gdańsk in 2023. She worked in the Social Insurance Institution and the County Labour Office in Świecie. Later, Karolewska was a secretary of the Świecie County for around ten years. She was a member of the Society of Enthusiasts of the Świecie Land, and the Society of Friends of Lower Vistula, and was a coordinator of the Local Government Workshop programme conducted by the Stephen Báthory Foundation.

In 2018, Karolewska was elected to the city council of Świecie. She ran as a candidate of the electoral committee Civic Local Government Agreement, from the constituency no. 1, and received 201 votes (4.68%). In 2023, Karolewska was elected to the Sejm of Poland, from the constituency no. 4, consisting of the eastern portion of the Kuyavian–Pomeranian Voivodeship. She ran as an independent candidate on the electoral list of the Civic Coalition, and received 8,572 votes (1.61%). In 2024, Karolewska joined the Civic Platform party, which in 2025, was merged into the Civic Coalition. In the Sejm, she has been a member of the Constitutional Accountability Committee, Environmental Protection, Natural Resources and Forestry Committee, Health Committee, Justice and Human Rights Committee, Local Government and Regional Policy Committee, and Committee for Liaison with Poles Abroad Committee. Karolewska is also the chairperson of the Permanent Subcommittee on the Implementation by Poland of Judgments of the European Court of Human Rights and Judgments of the Court of Justice of the European Union.

== Personal life ==
Karolewska has a husband and is a mother. She resides in the town of Świecie in Kuyavian–Pomeranian Voivodeship, Poland.

== Awards and decorations ==
- Honorary Badge for Merits to Tourism (2023)
- Title of the Ambassador of the Kuyavian–Pomeranian Constellations of Good Places (2023)

== Electoral results ==
Year	Office		Party	Constituency	Votes			Result	Ref.
Year	Office		Party	Constituency	Total	%	P.	Result	Ref.
2018	Świecie Town Council	8th	Electors' Electoral Committee; Civic Local Government Agreement	No. 1	201	4.68	5th	Won	
2023	Sejm of Poland	10th	Civic Coalition	No. 4	8,572	1.61	19th	Won	
