= Sylwia Pusz =

Polish former politician (born 1972)

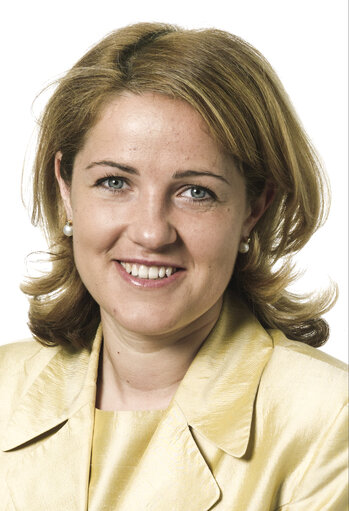
- Sylwia Pusz in 2004

Member of the Sejm
- In office 20 October 1997 – 18 October 2005

Member of the European Parliament
- In office 1 May 2004 – 19 July 2004

Personal details
- Born: 18 June 1972 (age 54) Poznań
- Party: Polish Social Democratic Party
- Education: Adam Mickiewicz University in Poznań

Sylwia Pusz (born 18 June 1972) is a Polish former politician. She was a member of the Sejm of the 3rd and 4th term (1997–2005), member of the European Parliament of the 5th term (2004).

== Biography ==
She graduated from the Faculty of Law and Administration of Adam Mickiewicz University in Poznań. In the years 1997–2005 she served as a member of parliament of the 3rd and 4th term from the Democratic Left Alliance list from Poznań constituencies: 35 and 39. In 2004 she joined the Social Democracy of Poland and on its behalf she sat in the European Parliament from 1 May to 19 July of the same year. In 2005 she was not re-elected to the Sejm.

In the years 1997-1999 she headed the Social Democratic Young Faction, in 1999 she became the chairwoman of the Young Democratic Left Alliance. From 2006 to 2010 she sat on the Greater Poland Voivodeship regional assembly on behalf of the Left and Democrats coalition . She was the vice-chairwoman of the SdPl, and also headed the Wielkopolska structures of this party. She started running a consulting company.

In 2009, she was a candidate for the European Parliament from the list of the coalition committee Agreement for the Future – CenterLeft in the Greater Poland European Parliament constituency. In January 2010, she resigned from party functions and announced her retirement from politics.

== Electoral history ==
Election	Party	Session	District	Result
1997	Sojusz Lewicy Demokratycznej	Sejm III kadencji	nr 35	9581 (1,90%) ✓
2001	Sojusz Lewicy Demokratycznej – Unia Pracy	Sejm IV kadencji	nr 39	16 401 (5,11%) ✓
2005	Socjaldemokracja Polska	Sejm V kadencji	nr 39	11 351 (3,72%) ✗
2009	Porozumienie dla Przyszłości – CentroLewica	Parlament Europejski VII kadencji	nr 7	16 334 (2,58%) ✗

== Bibliography ==
- "Posłowie IV kadencji: Sylwia Pusz", sejm.gov.pl

== See also ==
- List of members of the European Parliament for Poland, 2004
- List of observers to the European Parliament for Poland, 2003–2004
