= Rafał Bruski =

Polish politician

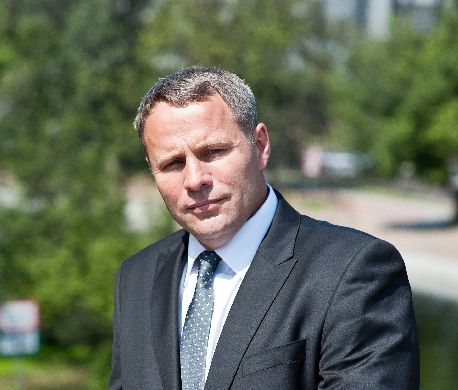

5th Voivode of Kuyavian-Pomeranian Voivodeship
- In office 2007-11-29 – 2010
- Preceded by: Zbigniew Hoffmann

Deputy-President of Bydgoszcz
- In office 2006–2007

Personal details
- Born: 1 July 1962 (age 63) Bydgoszcz, Poland
- Party: Civic Platform

Rafał Piotr Bruski (born 1 July 1962 in Bydgoszcz) is a Polish politician who is a president of Bydgoszcz (since 2010), was a Voivode of Kuyavian-Pomeranian Voivodeship (2007-2010) and a former Deputy-President of Bydgoszcz (2006-2007).

Bruski worked in Polskie Linie Oceaniczne (Polish Ocean Lines) in Gdynia (1986-1992) and Urząd Kontroli Skarbowej (Revenue Inspection Office) in Bydgoszcz (1994-2005).

In 2006 local election he was a candidate for Bydgoszcz City Councillor. He polled 481 votes only in 1st district. It was fifth result on Civic Platform list and Bruski was not elected. President of Bydgoszcz Konstanty Dombrowicz, who was re-elected, nominated him as his Deputy. Bruski was Deputy-President between 2006 and 2007.

After appointed of Donald Tusk Cabinet, Bruski was nominated as Voivode of Kuyavian-Pomeranian Voivodeship ('Polish: wojewoda kujawsko-pomorski). He was a Voivode since 29 November 2007.

He earned first place in the first round of the 2010 local election for President of Bydgoszcz, winning 43.28% of the votes and advanced to the second round, which took place on 5 December 2010. In the second round of voting Bruski won 59,17% of the votes, winning the election with the incumbent Konstanty Dombrowicz, who won 40,83% of the votes. In 2014 he successfully applied for re-election, defeating his predecessor in the second round of voting, winning 57.11% of the votes.

In 2015, he was one of the founders of the Bronisław Komorowski election committee in the presidential election. In the same year he was decorated with the Order of Polonia Restituta. In 2018, he again became a candidate for President of Bydgoszcz as a representative of the Civic Platform and Modern Coalition (within the Civic Coalition). He was re-elected in the first round, receiving 54.64% of votes.

== See also ==
- Kuyavian-Pomeranian Voivodeship
