= Paweł Szrot =

Polish politician (born 1975)

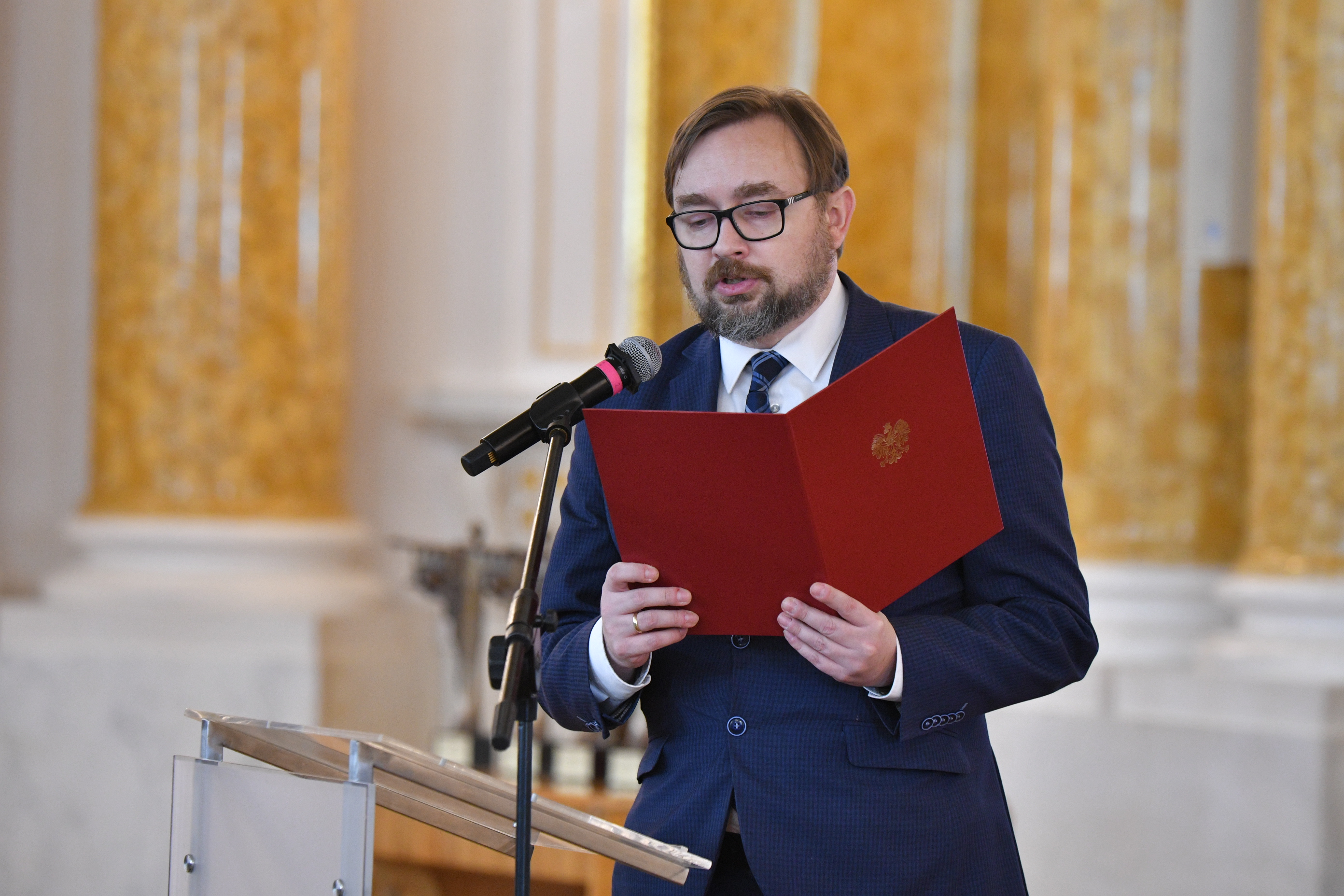
- Szrot in 2019

Member of the Sejm
- Incumbent
- Assumed office 13 November 2023
- Constituency: Bydgoszcz

Personal details
- Born: 30 June 1975 (age 51)
- Party: Law and Justice

Paweł Szrot (born 30 June 1975) is a Polish politician serving as a member of the Sejm since 2023. From 2021 to 2023, he served as chief of the presidential cabinet.

== Biography ==
A lawyer by training, he graduated from the Faculty of Law and Administration at the University of Warsaw.

He initially worked in Krzysztof Jurgiel's parliamentary office.
