= List of members of the European Parliament for Luxembourg, 1999–2004 =

This is a list of the 6 members of the European Parliament for Luxembourg in the 1999 to 2004 session.

== List ==
Name	National party	EP Group
Charles Goerens (Note: Resigned in 1999 to join the Juncker–Polfer Government. Replaced by Colette Flesch on 7 August 1999.)	Democratic Party	ELDR
Robert Goebbels	Socialist Workers' Party	PES
Viviane Reding (Note: Resigned in 1999 to join the Prodi Commission. Replaced by Astrid Lulling on 16 September 1999.)	Christian Social People's Party	EPP–ED
Jacques Poos	Socialist Workers' Party	PES
Jacques Santer	Christian Social People's Party	EPP–ED
Claude Turmes	The Greens	G–EFA

=== Party representation ===
National party	EP Group	Seats	±
Christian Social People's Party	EPP	2 / 6	Steady
Socialist Workers' Party	PES	2 / 6	Steady
Democratic Party	LD	1 / 6	Steady
The Greens	G	1 / 6	Steady
