= Magdalena Łośko =

Polish politician (born 1984)

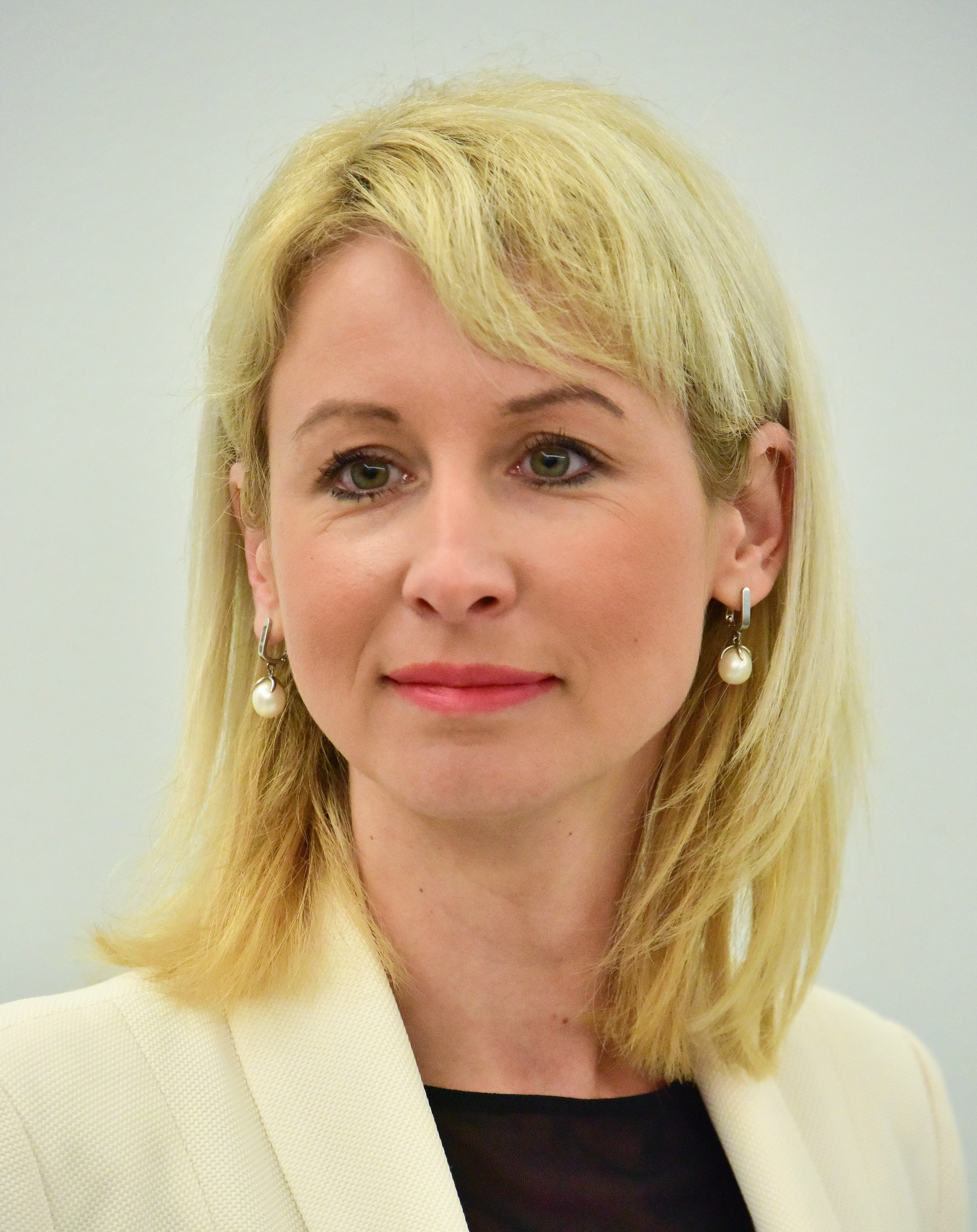

Member of the Sejm
- Incumbent
- Assumed office 26 January 2024
- In office 12 November 2019 – 12 November 2023
- Parliamentary group: Civic Coalition
- Constituency: No. 4 (Bydgoszcz)

Personal details
- Born: 30 August 1984 (age 41) Inowrocław, Poland

Magdalena Łośko (born 30 August 1984) is a Polish politician. She has served as a member of the Sejm between 2019 and 2023, and again since 2024, when she replaced Krzysztof Brejza. She represents the constituency of Bydgoszcz.
