= AutografExpo =

Former exhibition in Poland

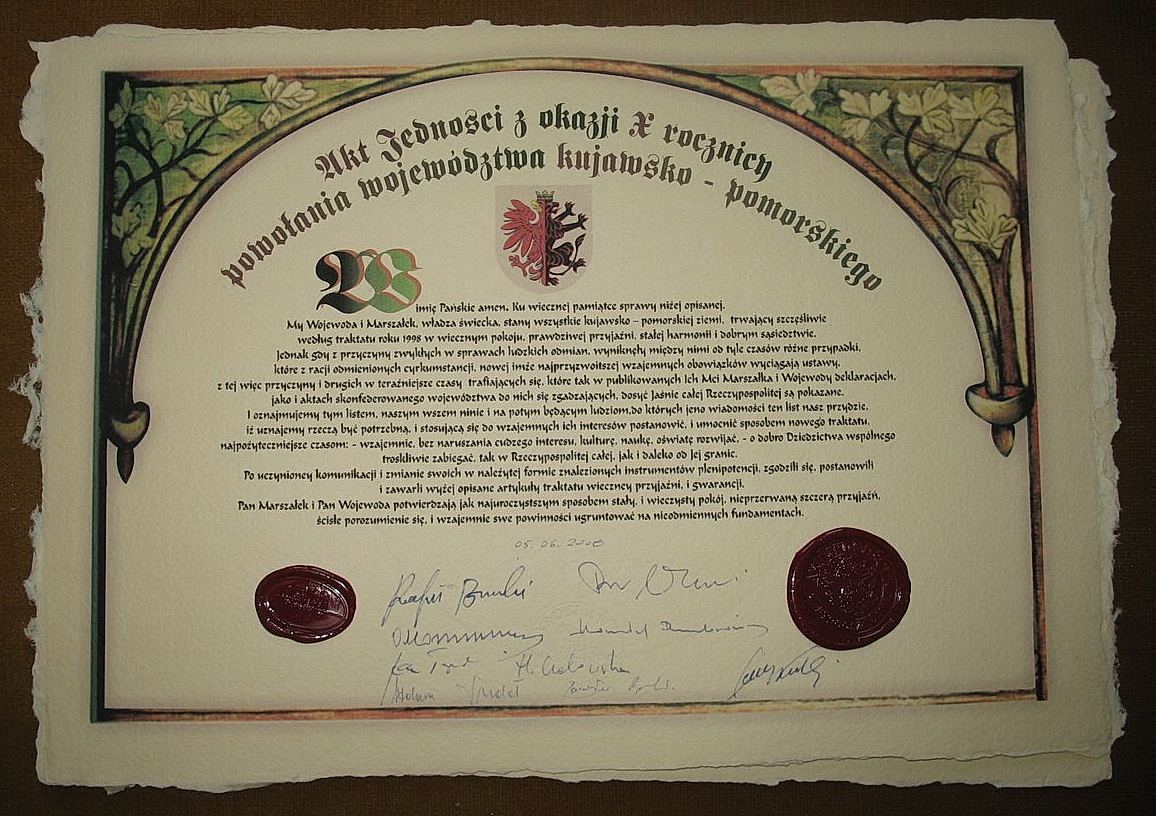
Act of Unity signed during the AutografExpo

AutografExpo was an exhibition of contemporary signed documents and autographs of public interest in Poland. The main organizer and promoter was forensic expert Jaroslaw Pijarowski.

Over a three-year period, a planning committee examined and chose 2,000 items from 75,000. It first opened July 5, 2008, in the Museum of Diplomacy and Polish Refugees, in the city of Bydgoszcz.

The exhibition also featured a display, "Act of Unity," a special signed document that commemorated the tenth anniversary of the creation of the Kuyavian-Pomeranian provincial region on 1 January 1999.

Franciszek Starowieyski received an award of the most interesting graphical representation of contemporary autographs.

After the exhibition, Jaroslaw Pijarowski received a special diploma and award from the head of the city of Bydgoszcz, Konstanty Dombrowicz
