= Piotr Marek Król =

Polish politician (born 1974)

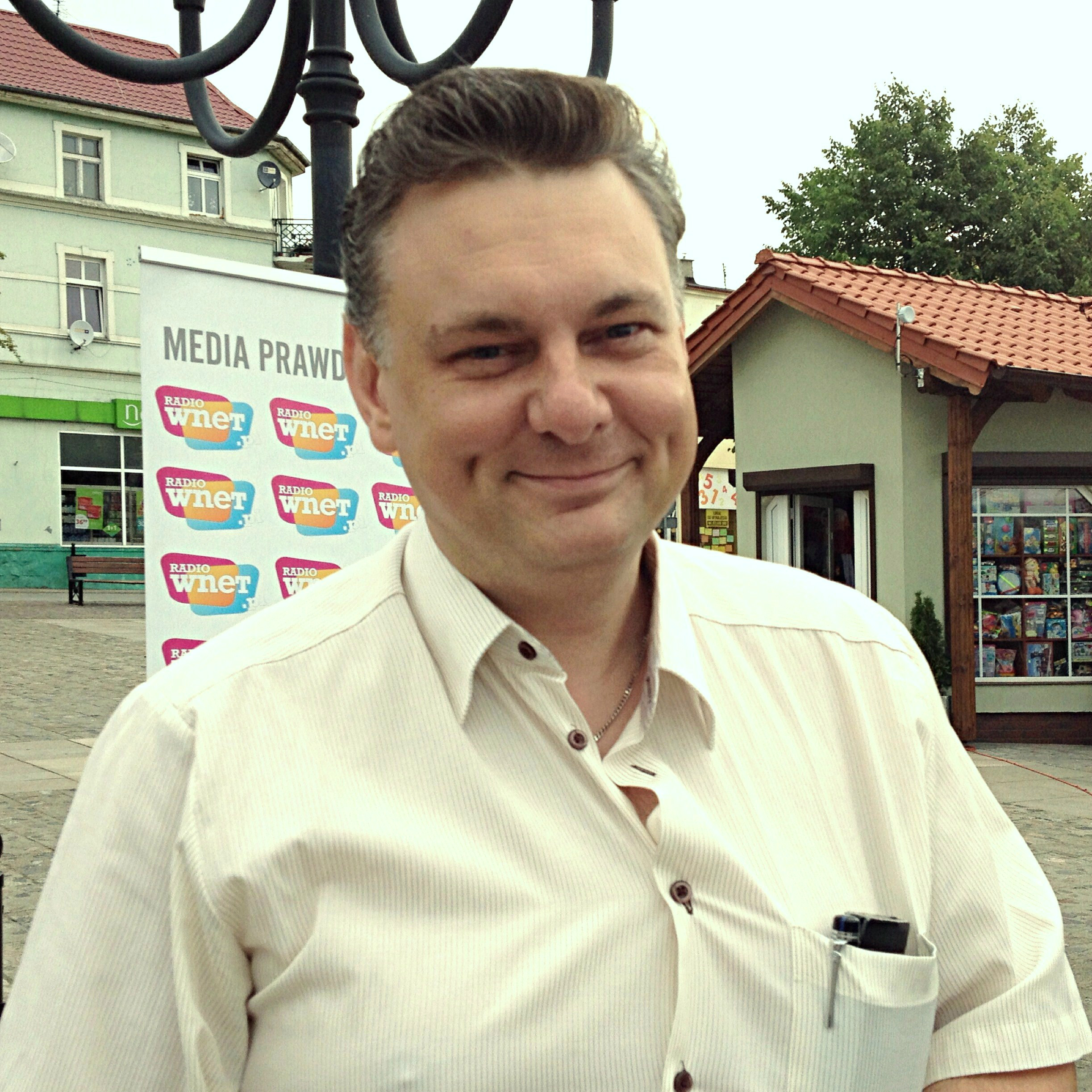

Member of Bydgoszcz City Council
- In office 27 November 2006 – 25 June 2014

Personal details
- Born: 26 June 1974 (age 51)
- Party: Law and Justice

Piotr Marek Król (born 26 June 1974) is a Polish politician, a Member of Bydgoszcz City Council who represented the 3rd district.

On 12 November 2006 he was elected to Bydgoszcz City Council. He succeeded in getting 931 votes in 3rd district, being a candidate from Law and Justice list. He took office on 27 November 2006. He was a Chairperson of Audit Committee and a member of the Spatial Planning Committee and the Sports and Tourism Committee.

He was elected to the Sejm on 5 June 2014 with 5797 votes as a candidate from the Law and Justice list.

== See also ==
- Bydgoszcz City Council
