= Dorota Jakuta =

Polish politician (born 1958)

Chairperson of Bydgoszcz City Council
- In office 27 November 2006 – ?

Personal details
- Born: 16 January 1958 (age 68)
- Party: Civic Platform

Dorota Jakuta (born 16 January 1958) is a Polish politician, current Chairperson of Bydgoszcz City Council and Councillor who represents the 4th district.

On 12 November 2006 she was elected to Bydgoszcz City Council. She scored 1,970 votes in 4th district, as candidate from Civic Platform list. She took office on 27 November 2006. She was elected to Council Chairperson Office. She is a member of Enterprise, Development and City Promotion Committee and Municipal Economy and Environmental Protection Committee.

== See also ==
- Bydgoszcz City Council
