= List of members of the European Parliament for the Netherlands, 1999–2004 =

This is a list of members of the European Parliament for the Netherlands in the 1999 to 2004 session, ordered by name and by party.

== Party representation ==
National party	EP Group	Seats	±
Christian Democratic Appeal	EPP-ED	9 / 31	1 ▼
Labour Party	PES	6 / 31	2 ▼
People's Party for Freedom and Democracy	ELDR	6 / 31	0
GreenLeft	G–EFA	4 / 31	3 ▲
SGP, GPV and RPF	EDD	3 / 31	1 ▲
Democrats 66	ELDR	2 / 31	2 ▼
Socialist Party	EUL–NGL	1 / 31	1 ▲

== Mutations ==
=== 1999 ===
- 10 June: Election for the European Parliament in the Netherlands.
- 20 July: Beginning of the 5th European Parliament session. (1999–2004)

=== 2001 ===
- 2 October: Jan-Kees Wiebenga (VVD) leaves the European Parliament, because he became a member of the Dutch Council of State.
- 12 November: Herman Vermeer (VVD) is installed in the European Parliament as a replacement for Jan-Kees Wiebenga

=== 2003 ===
- 30 January: Lousewies van der Laan (D66) leaves the European Parliament, taking her seat in the Dutch Parliament after the 2002 Dutch general election.
- 5 February: Johanna Boogerd-Quaak (D66) is installed in the European Parliament as a replacement for Lousewies van der Laan
- 27 May: Karla Peijs (CDA) leaves the European Parliament, because she became a minister in the Second Balkenende cabinet.
- 11 June: Peter Pex (CDA) is installed in the European Parliament as a replacement for Karla Peijs
- 1 October: Hanja Maij-Weggen (CDA) leaves the European Parliament, because she became a King's Commissioner in North Brabant.
- 8 October: Cees Bremmer (CDA) is installed in the European Parliament as a replacement for Hanja Maij-Weggen

== Alphabetical ==
MEPs for the Netherlands elected to the 5th European Parliament session
1999–2004
Name	Sex	National party	EP Group	Period	Preference vote
Bas Belder	Male	Reformed Political Party	EDD	20 July 1999 – 2 July 2019	20,491
Max van den Berg	Male	Labour Party	PES	20 July 1999 – 1 September 2007	584,167
Hans Blokland	Male	Reformed Political Alliance	EDD	19 July 1994 – 14 July 2009	245,214
Johanna Boogerd-Quaak	Female	Democrats 66	ELDR	5 February 2003 – 20 July 2004	10,992
Bob van den Bos	Male	Democrats 66	ELDR	20 July 1999 – 20 July 2004	8,712
Theo Bouwman	Male	GreenLeft	G–EFA	20 July 1999 – 20 July 2004	6,012
Cees Bremmer	Male	Christian Democratic Appeal	EPP–ED	8 October 2003 – 20 July 2004	2,956
Kathalijne Buitenweg	Female	GreenLeft	G–EFA	20 July 1999 – 14 July 2009	90,549
Ieke van den Burg	Female	Labour Party	PES	20 July 1999 – 14 July 2009	55,016
Dorette Corbey	Female	Labour Party	PES	20 July 1999 – 14 July 2009	4,898
Rijk van Dam	Male	Reformatory Political Federation	EDD	September 1997 – 20 July 2004	10,630
Bert Doorn	Male	Christian Democratic Appeal	EPP–ED	20 July 1999 – 14 July 2009	3,598
Elly Plooij-van Gorsel	Female	People's Party for Freedom and Democracy	ELDR	19 July 1994 – 20 July 2004	45,855
Marieke Sanders-ten Holte	Female	People's Party for Freedom and Democracy	ELDR	20 July 1999 – 20 July 2004	45,855
Michiel van Hulten	Male	Labour Party	PES	20 July 1999 – 20 July 2004	5,710
Lousewies van der Laan	Female	Democrats 66	ELDR	20 July 1999 – 30 January 2003	143,009
Joost Lagendijk	Male	GreenLeft	G–EFA	1 September 1998 – 14 July 2009	245,642
Albert Jan Maat	Male	Christian Democratic Appeal	EPP–ED	20 July 1999 – 10 April 2007	34,622
Jules Maaten	Male	People's Party for Freedom and Democracy	ELDR	20 July 1999 – 14 July 2009	4,341
Hanja Maij-Weggen	Female	Christian Democratic Appeal	EPP–ED	19 July 1994 – 1 October 2003	591,505
Toine Manders	Male	People's Party for Freedom and Democracy	ELDR	20 July 1999 – 1 July 2014; 2 July 2019 – Present	14,237
Maria Martens	Female	Christian Democratic Appeal	EPP–ED	20 July 1999 – 14 July 2009	16,254
Erik Meijer	Male	Socialist Party	EUL–NGL	20 July 1999 – 14 July 2009	124,800
Jan Mulder	Male	People's Party for Freedom and Democracy	ELDR	19 July 1994 – 14 July 2009; 22 June 2010 – 1 July 2014	13,825
Ria Oomen-Ruijten	Female	Christian Democratic Appeal	EPP–ED	25 July 1989 – 1 July 2014	99,584
Arie Oostlander	Male	Christian Democratic Appeal	EPP–ED	25 July 1989 – 20 July 2004	17,628
Karla Peijs	Female	Christian Democratic Appeal	EPP–ED	25 July 1989 – 27 May 2003	11,975
Peter Pex	Male	Christian Democratic Appeal	EPP–ED	11 June 2003 – 20 July 2004	8,380
Bartho Pronk	Male	Christian Democratic Appeal	EPP–ED	20 November 1989 – 20 July 2004	7,929
Alexander de Roo	Male	GreenLeft	G–EFA	20 July 1999 – 20 July 2004	4,343
Joke Swiebel	Female	Labour Party	PES	20 July 1999 – 20 July 2004	12,554
Wim van Velzen	Male	Christian Democratic Appeal	EPP–ED	19 July 1994 – 20 July 2004	103,743
Herman Vermeer	Male	People's Party for Freedom and Democracy	ELDR	12 November 2001 – 20 July 2004	6,535
Jan-Kees Wiebenga	Male	People's Party for Freedom and Democracy	ELDR	19 July 1994 – October 2001	535,904
Jan Marinus Wiersma	Male	Labour Party	PES	19 July 1994 – 14 July 2009	9,753
