= Kosma Złotowski =

Polish politician (born 1964)

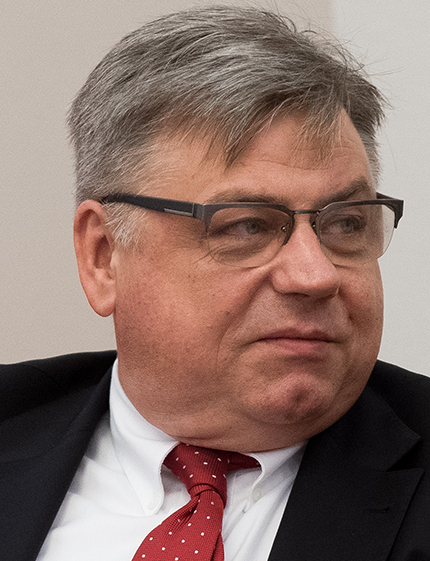

Member of Sejm of Poland III Term
- In office 1997–2001

Member of Senate of Poland
- In office 19 October 2005 – 4 November 2007; Alongside: Radosław Sikorski
- Constituency: 4 Bydgoszcz district

President (=Mayor) of Bydgoszcz
- In office 15 July 1994 – 19 July 1995

Member of Bydgoszcz City Council
- In office 2002 – 12 October 2005
- Constituency: 1st district

Personal details
- Born: 14 January 1964 (age 62) Bydgoszcz, Poland
- Party: Centre Agreement (1990-1999); Conference of Polish Christian Democrats (1997-2001); Law and Justice (since 2002)
- Education: University of Warsaw; Dominican University
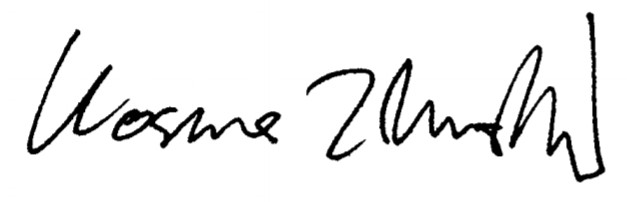
- Signature

Kosma Tadeusz Złotowski (born 14 January 1964) is a Polish politician who was a member of both chambers of the Polish parliament (1997-2001, 2005-2007), President (Mayor) of Bydgoszcz (1994-1995) and a member of Bydgoszcz City Council (2002-2005).

== Early life and education ==
Złotowski was born in Bydgoszcz. He graduated in Polish philology from University of Warsaw. In 2004, obtained the degree of Master of Business Administration (MBA) at Dominican University in Chicago.

== Career ==
After 1994 local election new Bydgoszcz City Council elected him as the President (=Mayor) of Bydgoszcz. He served in this office between July 1994 and July 1995 and was replaced by Henryk Sapalski.

In 1997 Sejm election he joined the Senate of Poland III term (upper house of the Polish parliament) representing the Bydgoszcz district as Solidarity Electoral Action candidate.

In 2002 Polish local election he joined the Bydgoszcz City Council IV term representing the 1st district. He polled 1,112 votes and was first on the Law and Justice (PiS) list. His term was ended when he was elected to Sejm in 2005. His seat in the Council was replaced by the second candidate on the PiS list Marian Pastuszewski. He ran in the 2002 Bydgoszcz presidencial election. He scored 8,994 votes (10.99%) and was third in race. The new president was elected in the second ballot.

In 2004 European Parliament election he was a candidate of Law and Justice from Kuyavian-Pomeranian constituency. He polled 4,264 votes and was not elected.

In 2005 Senate election he joined the Senate of Poland IV term (upper house of the Polish parliament) representing the 4 Bydgoszcz district. He polled 59,986 votes. In 2007 Senate election he scored 86,750 and was not elected.

== See also ==
- Bydgoszcz
