= List of observers to the European Parliament for Slovenia, 2003–2004 =

This is a list of the 7 observers to the European Parliament for Slovenia in the 1999 to 2004 session. They were appointed by the Slovenian Parliament as observers from 1 May 2003 until the accession of Slovenia to the EU on 1 May 2004.

== List ==
Name	National party	EP Group
Miha Brejc	Democratic Party	EPP–ED
Ljubo Germič	Liberal Democracy	ELDR
Feri Horvat	Social Democrats	PES
Roman Jakič	Liberal Democracy	ELDR
Jelko Kacin	Liberal Democracy	ELDR
Alojz Peterle	New Slovenia	EPP–ED
Janez Podobnik	People's Party	EPP–ED

== Sources ==
- (in Slovenian)
