= List of observers to the European Parliament for Estonia, 2003–2004 =

This is a list of the 6 observers to the European Parliament for Estonia in the 1999 to 2004 session. They were appointed by the Estonian Parliament as observers from 1 May 2003 until the accession of Estonia to the EU on 1 May 2004.

== List ==
Name	National party	EP Group
Eiki Berg	Res Publica Party	EPP–ED
Toomas Hendrik Ilves	Social Democratic Party	PES
	Centre Party	ELDR
Mart Laar	Pro Patria Union	EPP–ED
Janno Reiljan	People's Union	UEN
Toomas Savi	Reform Party	ELDR

== Sources ==
- Ministry of Foreign Affairs (in Latvian)
