= List of observers to the European Parliament for Cyprus, 2003–2004 =

This is a list of the 6 observers to the European Parliament for Cyprus in the 1999 to 2004 session. They were appointed by the Cypriot Parliament as observers from 1 May 2003 until the accession of Cyprus to the EU on 1 May 2004.

== List ==
Name	National party	EP Group
Panayiotis Demetriou	Democratic Rally	EPP–ED
Marios Matsakis	Democratic Party	ALDE
