= List of observers to the European Parliament for Malta, 2003–2004 =

This is a list of the 5 observers to the European Parliament for Malta in the 1999 to 2004 session. They were appointed by the Maltese Parliament as observers from 1 May 2003 until the accession of Malta to the EU on 1 May 2004.

== List ==
Name	National party	EP Group
John Attard Montalto	Labour Party	PES
Josef Bonnici	Nationalist Party	EPP–ED
Tonio Fenech	Nationalist Party	EPP–ED
Michael Frendo	Nationalist Party	EPP–ED
George Vella	Labour Party	PES
