= Zbigniew Sosnowski =

Polish politician

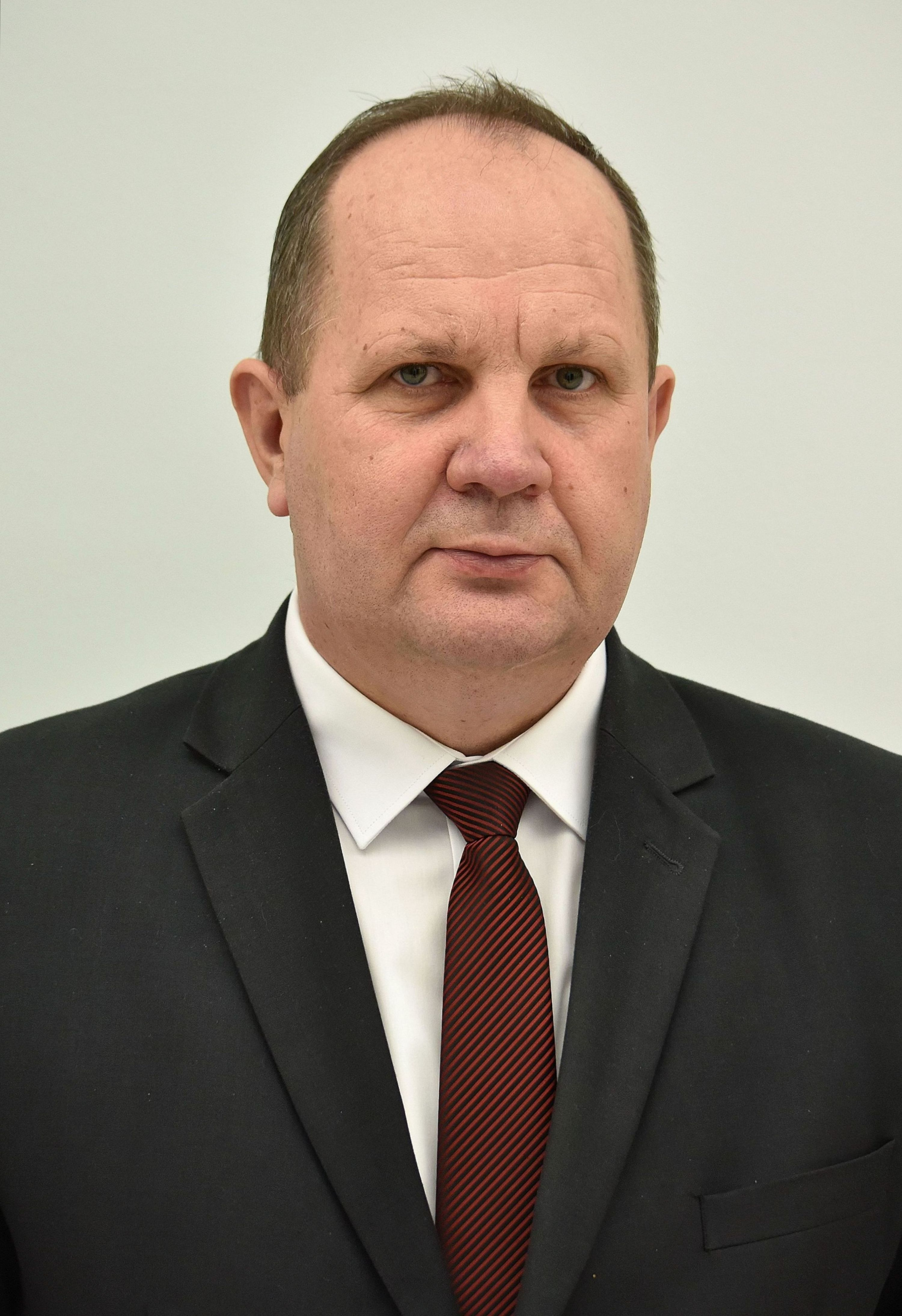

member of Sejm 2005-2007
- In office 25 September 2005 – ?

Personal details
- Born: 10 December 1963 (age 62) Rypin, Poland
- Party: Polish People's Party

Zbigniew Sosnowski (born 10 December 1963 in Rypin) is a Polish politician. He was elected to the Sejm on 25 September 2005, getting 5937 votes in 5 Toruń district as a candidate from the Polish People's Party list.

He was also a member of Sejm 2001-2005.

== See also ==
- Members of Polish Sejm 2005-2007
