= Johanna Boogerd-Quaak =

Dutch politician (born 1944)

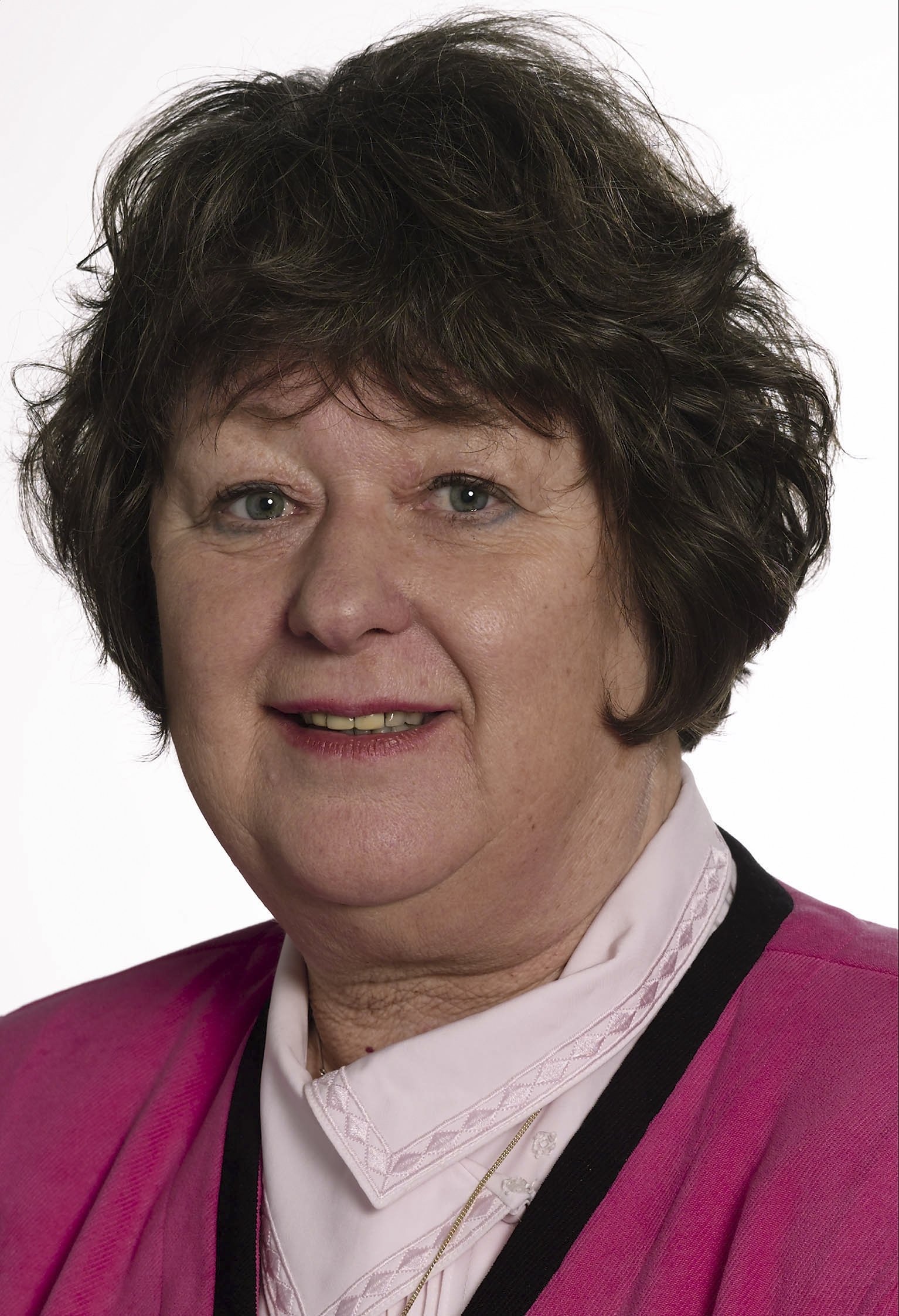
- Official portrait, c. 2003–2004

Member of the European Parliament for the Netherlands
- In office 19 July 1994 – 19 July 1999
- Parliamentary group: European Liberal Democrat and Reform Party Group
- In office 5 February 2003 – 19 July 2004
- Parliamentary group: European Liberal Democrat and Reform Party Group

Personal details
- Born: 1 March 1944 (age 82) Axel, Netherlands
- Party: Democrats 66

Johanna Levina Adriana Boogerd-Quaak (born 1 March 1944) is a Dutch politician who served two terms as a Member of the European Parliament (MEP) from 1994 to 1999 and again between 2003 and 2004. She is a member of the Democrats 66 party and of the European Liberal Democrat and Reform Party Group. During her two periods as an MEP, Boogerd-Quaak served on several committees and was vice-chair of each of the Committee on Citizens' Freedoms and Rights, Justice and Home Affairs and the Delegation to the European Economic Area Joint Parliamentary Committee. She was appointed Knight of the Order of Orange-Nassau in 1999.

== Biography ==
On 1 March 1944, she was born Johanna Levina Adriana Boogerd-Quaak in Axel, Netherlands. She is a member of the Democrats 66 party. Boogerd-Quaak was the co-owner of a farm in Zeeland. From 1978 to 1990, she was a member of the Provincial Council of Zeeland. Boogerd-Quaak was chair of the Zeeland Environmental Platform; president of the Regional Board for Labour' Facility Zeeland, and served as Humanitas's transition manager between 1992 and 1994.

She was elected to the European Parliament as a member of the European Liberal Democrat and Reform Party Group in the 1994 European Parliament election in the Netherlands for an elected period from 19 July 1994 to 19 July 1999. During this period, Boogerd-Quaak served on the Temporary committee on employment, the Delegation to the European Economic Area Joint Parliamentary Committee as vice-chair, and twice on each of the Delegation for relations with Ukraine, Belarus and Moldova and the Committee on Social Affairs and Employment. She was a substitute on the Committee on Agriculture and Rural Development and twice on the Committee on Economic and Monetary Affairs and Industrial Policy.

Boogerd-Quaak was appointed Knight of the Order of Orange-Nassau in September 1999 for her work in daycare and elderly centres and received the honour at a ceremony in Brussels. She was elected to the municipal council of Terneuzen and served on it from 14 March 2002 to February 2003. On 5 February 2003, Boogerd-Quaak replaced Lousewies van der Laan as a member of the European Parliament for the European Liberal Democrat and Reform Party Group following the latter's election to the House of Representatives. She remained an MEP until 19 July 2004. During this period, she was a member of the Delegation for relations with the Palestinian Legislative Council, the Committee on Women's Rights and Equal Opportunities and was a substitute for the Committee on Employment and Social Affairs. Boogerd-Quaak was appointed vice-chair of the Committee on Citizens' Freedoms and Rights, Justice and Home Affairs on 13 March 2003.

She earned a nomination for MEP of the Year in November 2004 because her efforts meant the European Union withdrew a proposal to transfer all sorts of data to authorities of the United States.

== Electoral history ==
A (possibly incomplete) overview of Dutch elections Boogerd-Quaak participated in
Election	Party	Candidate number	Votes	Refs
1999 European Parliament election in the Netherlands	Democrats 66	3		
2004 European Parliament election in the Netherlands	Democrats 66	2		
2010 Dutch municipal elections in Terneuzen	Democrats 66	7	35	
2011 Dutch Senate election	Democrats 66			
2014 European Parliament election in the Netherlands	Democrats 66	35		
2015 Dutch Senate election	Democrats 66	19		
2019 Dutch provincial elections in Zeeland	Democrats 66	17		
2019 European Parliament election in the Netherlands	Democrats 66	22	979	
