= Piotr Całbecki =

Polish politician

2nd Marshal of Kuyavian-Pomeranian Voivodeship
- Incumbent
- Assumed office 24 November 2006
- Preceded by: Waldemar Achramowicz

Member of Kuyavian-Pomeranian Regional Assembly from 4 district
- Incumbent
- Assumed office 2002

Toruń City Council
- In office 1998–2002

Personal details
- Born: October 4, 1967 (age 58) Toruń, Poland
- Party: Civic Platform
- Education: Nicolaus Copernicus University

Piotr Franciszek Całbecki (born 4 October 1967 in Toruń, Poland) is a Polish politician who is a current member of Kuyavian-Pomeranian Regional Assembly and Kuyavian-Pomeranian Voivodeship Marshal. He was part of the Toruń City Councillors between 1998-2002.

In 1998 Polish local election, he was elected to the Toruń City Council as a member of the city's executive board.

In 2002 Polish local election, he joined the Regional Assembly II term representing the 4th district. He polled 3,908 votes and was first on the POPiS list.

In 2004 European Parliament election, he was a candidate of Civic Platform from Kuyavian-Pomeranian constituency. He polled 4,800 votes and was not elected.

In 2006 local election, he was elected again. He scored 22,985 votes, running on the Civic Platform list. Assembly III Term elected him as Voivodeship Marshal (Marszałek Województwa Kujawsko-Pomorskiego), chairperson of voivodeship executive board.

Reelected in 2010 and elected again by assembly as Voivodeship Marshal. From 2012, alternate member of Polish national delegation in European Committee of the Regions. From 2024, full member of the delegation. Since February 21, 2025, chairman in Commission for Natural Resources in European Committee of the Regions.

In 2014, elected again to assembly and for the third time chosen as Voivodeship Marshal. From 2015 since 2023, member of presidential National Development Council.

In 2018, reelected to assembly and fourth time elected as Voivodeship Marshal. From 2018, also member of Joint Commission of the Government and Local Government. In 2024, again elected as a voivodeship councilor. On May 9, 2024, for the fifth time, councilors entrusted him with remaining the marshal.

== See also ==
- Kuyavian-Pomeranian Regional Assembly
