= Sejm Constituency no. 4 =

Parliamentary constituency in Poland

Sejm Constituency no. 4 Bydgoszcz
- Okręg wyborczy nr 4 Bydgoszcz
- Constituency for the Sejm
- Location within Poland.
- Counties: Bydgoszcz (city county), Bydgoszcz (land county), Inowrocław, Mogilno, Nakło, Sępólno, Świecie, Tuchola, Żnin
- Voivodeship: Kuyavian-Pomeranian
- Population: 984,022 (June 2023)
- Electorate: 745,557 (2023)
- Area: 8,916.15 km (5,540.24 mi)

Current constituency
- Created: 2001
- Deputies: 12
- Regional assembly: Kuyavian-Pomeranian Voivodeship Sejmik
- Senate constituencies: 9, 10
- EP constituency: Kuyavian-Pomeranian

Sejm Constituency no. 4 (Polish: Okręg wyborczy nr 4) is a constituency of the Sejm in Kuyavian-Pomeranian Voivodeship electing twelve deputies. It consists of city county of Bydgoszcz (constituency's seat) and land counties of Bydgoszcz, Inowrocław, Mogilno, Nakło, Sępólno, Świecie, Tuchola and Żnin.

== Elections ==
=== 2001 ===
2001 parliamentary election: Bydgoszcz
Party	Votes	%	Seats
Democratic Left Alliance – Labour Union	173,486	50.37	7
Self-Defence of the Republic of Poland	32,953	9.57	1
Civic Platform	30,904	8.97	1
League of Polish Families	28,103	8.16	1
Polish People's Party	27,028	7.85	1
Law and Justice	25,419	7.38	1
Solidarity of the Right Electoral Action	17,114	4.97	0
Freedom Union	7,802	2.27	0
Social Alternative Movement	917	0.27	0
Polish Economic Union	671	0.19	0
Total	344,397	100.00	12
Valid votes	344,397	95.35	
Invalid/blank votes	16,778	4.65	
Total votes	361,175	100.00	
Registered voters/turnout	778,124	46.42	
Source: National Electoral Commission

=== 2005 ===
2005 parliamentary election: Bydgoszcz
Party	Votes	%	Seats
Law and Justice	70,464	24.71	4
Civic Platform	59,334	20.80	3
Democratic Left Alliance	53,211	18.66	3
Self-Defence of the Republic of Poland	33,363	11.70	1
League of Polish Families	19,121	6.70	1
Polish People's Party	17,578	6.16	0
Social Democracy of Poland	8,872	3.11	0
Democratic Party – demokraci.pl	4,858	1.70	0
Polish Labour Party	4,594	1.61	0
Patriotic Movement	4,274	1.50	0
Janusz Korwin-Mikke Platform	3,979	1.40	0
Other	5,562	1.95	0
Total	285,210	100.00	12
Valid votes	285,210	93.54	
Invalid/blank votes	19,704	6.46	
Total votes	304,914	100.00	
Registered voters/turnout	803,693	37.94	
Source: National Electoral Commission

=== 2007 ===
2007 parliamentary election: Bydgoszcz
Party	Votes	%	Seats
Civic Platform	184,705	44.09	6
Law and Justice	101,436	24.21	3
Left and Democrats	79,619	19.01	2
Polish People's Party	36,476	8.71	1
Self-Defence of the Republic of Poland	7,154	1.71	0
Polish Labour Party	5,030	1.20	0
League of Polish Families	4,482	1.07	0
Total	418,902	100.00	12
Total votes	429,434	–	
Registered voters/turnout	806,833	53.22	
Source: National Electoral Commission

=== 2011 ===
2011 parliamentary election: Bydgoszcz
Party	Votes	%	Seats
Civic Platform	158,938	43.23	6
Law and Justice	80,632	21.93	3
Palikot's Movement	44,447	12.09	1
Democratic Left Alliance	38,001	10.34	1
Polish People's Party	30,509	8.30	1
Poland Comes First	6,929	1.88	0
New Right	5,909	1.61	0
Polish Labour Party - August 80	2,259	0.61	0
Total	367,624	100.00	12
Total votes	388,194	–	
Registered voters/turnout	812,579	47.77	
Source: National Electoral Commission

=== 2015 ===
2015 parliamentary election: Bydgoszcz
Party	Votes	%	Seats
Law and Justice	113,024	30.20	5
Civic Platform	110,948	29.64	4
United Left	37,583	10.04	0
Kukiz'15	29,080	7.77	1
Modern	27,334	7.30	1
Polish People's Party	22,701	6.07	1
KORWiN	17,002	4.54	0
Partia Razem	14,062	3.76	0
Zbigniew Stonoga's party	2,543	0.68	0
Total	374,277	100.00	12
Valid votes	374,277	97.23	
Invalid/blank votes	10,667	2.77	
Total votes	384,944	100.00	
Registered voters/turnout	804,077	47.87	
Source: National Electoral Commission

=== 2019 ===
2019 parliamentary election: Bydgoszcz
Party	Votes	%	Seats
Law and Justice	167,550	36.43	5
Civic Coalition	142,844	31.05	4
The Left	69,763	15.17	2
Polish People's Party	41,497	9.02	1
Confederation	32,406	7.05	0
Nonpartisan and Local Government Activists	5,922	1.29	0
Total	459,982	100.00	12
Total votes	466,394	–	
Registered voters/turnout	778,558	59.90	
Source: National Electoral Commission

=== 2023 ===
2023 parliamentary election: Bydgoszcz
Party	Votes	%	Seats
Civic Coalition	186,914	35.01	5
Law and Justice	162,603	30.45	4
Third Way	80,426	15.06	2
The Left	52,959	9.92	1
Confederation	34,266	6.42	0
Nonpartisan Local Government Activists	8,905	1.67	0
There is One Poland	7,846	1.47	0
Total	533,919	100.00	12
Valid votes	533,919	98.05	
Invalid/blank votes	10,641	1.95	
Total votes	544,560	100.00	
Registered voters/turnout	745,557	73.04	
Source: National Electoral Commission

== List of members ==
Deputies for the 10th Sejm (2023–2027)
Deputy	Party	Parliamentary group
Włodzisław Giziński	Civic Platform	Civic Coalition
Iwona Maria Kozłowska	Civic Platform	Civic Coalition
Paweł Olszewski	Civic Platform	Civic Coalition
Iwona Karolewska	Independent	Civic Coalition
Magdalena Łośko	Civic Platform	Civic Coalition
Bartosz Kownacki	Law and Justice	Law and Justice
Piotr Król	Law and Justice	Law and Justice
Łukasz Schreiber	Law and Justice	Law and Justice
Paweł Szrot	Law and Justice	Law and Justice
Norbert Pietrykowski	Poland 2050	Poland 2050
Agnieszka Kłopotek	Polish People's Party	Polish People's Party
Krzysztof Gawkowski	New Left	The Left

== See also ==
- Kuyavian-Pomeranian Voivodeship
