= Zootechnics =

Science of managing domestic or captive animals

Zootechnics is the scientific art of managing domestic or captive animals, including handling, breeding, and keeping.

Based on: genetics, reproduction (animal husbandry), feeding and nutrition, handling, health (preventive medicine) and economics.

Zootechnical studies or zootechnics engineering is a degree more popular in South America and Iberian Europe rather than in other parts of the world.

== See also ==
- Agricultural science – Academic field within biology
- Zoology – Scientific study of animals
