= Bydgoszcz City Council =

Current seats: Civic Coalition (16), Law and Justice (11) and Democratic Left Alliance (4).

The Bydgoszcz City Council (Polish: Rada Miasta Bydgoszczy) is a unicameral governing body of the city of Bydgoszcz, the capital of Kuyavian-Pomeranian Voivodeship. It consists of thirty-one councillors elected in free elections for a five-year term. The current chairperson of the council is Monika Matowska.

After elections in 2018 in Bydgoszcz was formed a centre-left coalition between liberal and pro-market Civic Coalition and social democratic Democratic Left Alliance. Conservative Law and Justice remained in opposition.

== City Council Members (2018-23) ==
- election: 21 October 2018
- First meeting: 19 November 2018
- Chairperson: Monika Matowska (KO)
- Vice-Chairpersons:
  - Ireneusz Nitkiewicz (SLD)
  - Lech Zagłoba-Zygler (KO)
  - Szymon Wiłnicki (KO)

=== 1st district ===
- Civic Coalition (3 seats):
  - Agnieszka Bąk
  - Robert Langowski
  - Paulina Jankowska
- Law and Justice (2 seats):
  - Szymon Róg
  - Bogdan Dzakanowski

=== 2nd district ===
- Civic Coalition (3 seats):
  - Joanna Czerkas-Thomas
  - Jakub Mikołajczak
  - Katarzyna Zalewska
- Law and Justice (1 seat):
  - Krystian Frelichowski
- Democratic Left Alliance (1 seat):
  - Ireneusz Nitkiewicz

=== 3rd district ===
- Civic Coalition (3 seats):
  - Lech Zagłoba-Zygler
  - Katarzyna Zwierzchowska
  - Justyna Polasik
- Law and Justice (2 seats):
  - Bernadeta Michałek
  - Andrzej Młyński
- Democratic Left Alliance (1 seat):
  - Kazimierz Drozd

=== 4th district ===
- Civic Coalition (3 seats):
  - Elżbieta Rusielewicz
  - Janusz Czwojda
  - Robert Kufel
- Law and Justice (2 seats):
  - Paweł Bokiej
  - Jan Gaul

=== 5th district ===
- Civic Coalition (2 seats):
  - Monika Matowska
  - Szymon Wiłnicki
- Law and Justice (2 seats):
  - Jarosław Wenderlich
  - Marcin Lewandowski
- Democratic Left Alliance (1 seat):
  - Zdzisław Tylicki

=== 6th district ===
- Civic Coalition (2 seats):
  - Maciej Świątkowski
  - Mateusz Zwolak
- Law and Justice (2 seats):
  - Grażyna Szabelska
  - Jerzy Mickuś
- Democratic Left Alliance (1 seat):
  - Anna Mackiewicz

== See also ==
- List of presidents of Bydgoszcz
- City Council
- Bydgoszcz
