= Kuyavian–Pomeranian Voivodeship Sejmik =

Kuyavian-Pomeranian Voivodeship Sejmik Sejmik Województwa Kujawsko-Pomorskiego

Type
- Type: Unicameral

Leadership
- Chairperson: Elżbieta Piniewska, KO
- Vice-Chairpersons: Józef Ramlau, Katarzyna Lubańska, Przemysław Sznajdarowski
- Marshal: Piotr Całbecki, KO

Structure
- Seats: 30 councillors
- Political groups: Executive board (19): KO (14); PO (12); iPL (1); Independent (1); PSL (3); P2050 (2); Opposition (11): PiS (9); PiS (8); SP (1); R+ (2)

Elections
- Last election: 7 April 2024

Meeting place
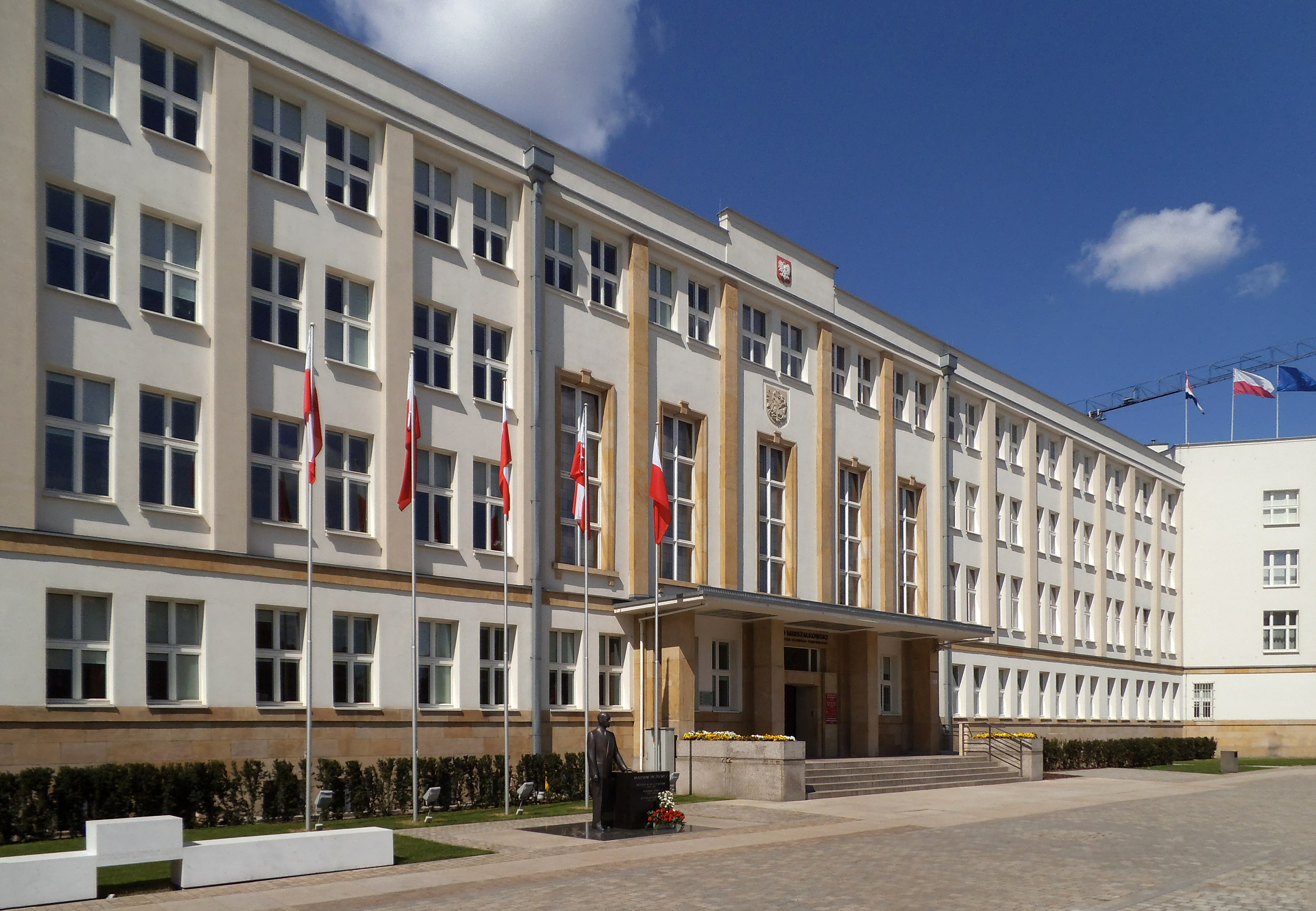
- Marshal's Office, Toruń

Website
- Official website

The Kuyavian–Pomeranian Voivodeship Sejmik (Polish: Sejmik Województwa Kujawsko-Pomorskiego) is the regional legislature of the Voivodeship of Kuyavia-Pomerania in Poland. It is a unicameral parliamentary body consisting of thirty councillors chosen during regional elections for a five-year term. The current chairperson of the assembly is Elżbieta Piniewska.

The assembly elects the executive board that acts as the collective executive for the regional government, headed by the voivodeship marshal. The current Executive Board of Kuyavia-Pomerania is a coalition government between the Civic Coalition, Polish People's Party and Poland 2050. The board's current chief executive is Marshal Piotr Całbecki of Civic Coalition.

The assembly convenes within the Marshal's Office in Toruń.

== Leadership of the Assembly ==
The Chairperson of the Assembly (Polish: Przewodniczący Sejmiku, speaker or president) presides over the Assembly in the chief leadership position, controlling the flow of legislation. The Chairperson and two Vice-Chairpersons are elected by the coalition parties, followed by confirmation of the full Assembly on passage of a floor vote. Other Assembly leaders, such as the Group Chairperson (Przewodniczący Koła Radnych, Chairperson of Councillors' Club) are elected by internal rules.

=== Officers ===
- Chairperson of the Assembly - Elżbieta Piniewska, Civic Coalition
- Vice-Chairperson of the Assembly -Katarzyna Lubańska
- Vice-Chairperson of the Assembly - Józef Ramlau
- Vice-Chairperson of the Assembly - Przemysław Sznajdrowski

== Districts ==
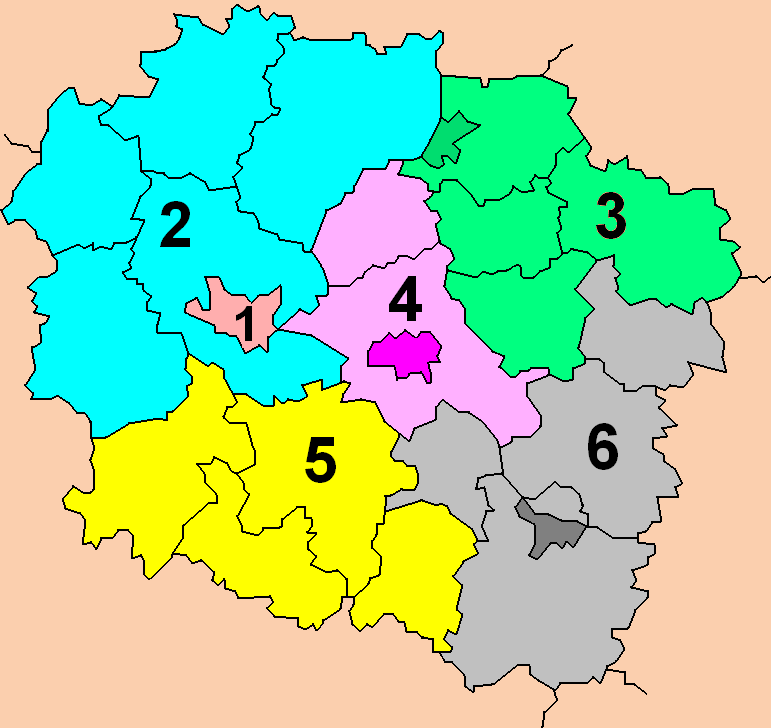
Electoral districts.

Members of the assembly are elected from six districts and serve five-year terms. Districts doe not have the constituencies' formal names. Instead, each constituency has a number and territorial description.

Number	Seats	City counties	Land counties
1	5	Bydgoszcz	None
2	5	None	Bydgoszcz, Nakło, Sępólno, Świecie, Tuchola
3	5	Grudziądz	Brodnica, Golub-Dobrzyń, Grudziądz, Wąbrzeźno
4	5	Toruń	Chełmno, Toruń
5	5	None	Inowrocław, Mogilno, Radziejów, Żnin
6	5	Włocławek	Aleksandrów, Lipno, Rypin, Włocławek

== See also ==
- Polish Regional Assembly
- Kuyavian-Pomeranian Voivodeship

== Charts ==
1998

2006

2010

2014

2018
