= Fifth European Parliament =

5th European Parliament
- 20 July 1999 – 5 May 2004
- President (1st Half): Nicole Fontaine
- President (2nd Half): Pat Cox
- Commission: Prodi
- MEPs: 626
- Elections: June 1999

The fifth European Parliament is the fifth five-year term of the elected European Parliament. It began following the June 1999 elections and ended after the June 2004 elections.

The constitutive session was held on Tuesday 20 July 1999. Nicole Fontaine (EPP-ED, France) was elected as President by absolute majority in the first ballot. As oldest member Mário Soares (PES, Portugal) was also candidate, second-oldest member Giorgio Napolitano opened the session instead.

On 15 January 2002, Pat Cox was elected president for the second half of the term.
