= List of elections in 1996 =

The following elections occurred in the year 1996.

- 1995–1996 Azerbaijani parliamentary election
- 1996 Beninese presidential election
- 1996 Comorian presidential election
- 1996 New Zealand general election
- 1996 Nicaraguan general election
- 1996 Samoan general election
- 1996 Tongan general election

== Africa ==
- 1996 Algerian constitutional referendum
- 1996 Cape Verdean presidential election
- 1996 Chadian presidential election
- 1996 Chadian constitutional referendum
- 1996 Comorian legislative election
- 1996 Comorian constitutional referendum
- 1996 Equatorial Guinean presidential election
- 1996 Gabonese legislative election
- 1996 Gambian presidential election
- 1996 Gambian constitutional referendum
- 1996 Ghanaian presidential election
- 1996 Lithuanian constitutional referendum
- 1996 Malagasy presidential election
- 1996 Mauritanian parliamentary election
- 1996 Nigerien parliamentary election
- 1996 Nigerien presidential election
- 1996 Nigerien constitutional referendum
- 1996 Sierra Leonean general election
- 1995–96 South African municipal elections
- 1996 Sudanese general election
- 1996 São Tomé and Príncipe presidential election
- 1996 Ugandan parliamentary election
- 1996 Ugandan presidential election
- 1996 Zambian general election
- 1996 Zimbabwean presidential election

== Asia ==
- 1996 Abkhazian parliamentary election
- 1996 Armenian presidential election
- 1996 Autonomous Region in Muslim Mindanao general election
- February 1996 Bangladeshi general election
- June 1996 Bangladeshi general election
- 1996 Bangladeshi presidential election
- 1996 Cypriot legislative election
- 1996 Iranian legislative election
- 1996 Iraqi parliamentary election
- 1996 Israeli legislative election
- 1996 Israeli prime ministerial election
- 1996 Japanese general election
- 1996 Kuwaiti general election
- 1996 Kyrgyz constitutional referendum
- 1996 Lebanese general election
- 1996 Mongolian parliamentary election
- 1996 Palestinian general election
- 1996 Philippine Sangguniang Kabataan election
- 1996 Republic of China National Assembly election (Taiwan)
- 1996 Republic of China presidential election (Taiwan)
- 1996 Russian presidential election
- 1996 Sarawak state election
- 1996 South Korean legislative election
- 1996 Thai general election

=== India ===
- Indian general election in Haryana, 1996
- Indian general election in Tamil Nadu, 1996
- 1996 Indian general election
- 1996 Tamil Nadu legislative assembly election

=== Russia ===
- Elections in Astrakhan Oblast
- Krasnodar Krai Head of Administration elections
- 1996 Russian presidential election

== Australia ==
- 1996 Australian federal election
- 1996 Blaxland by-election
- 1996 Clarence state by-election
- 1996 Lindsay by-election
- 1996 Mundingburra state by-election
- 1996 Orange state by-election
- 1996 Pittwater state by-election
- 1996 Port Macquarie state by-election
- 1996 Southern Highlands state by-election
- 1996 Strathfield state by-election
- 1996 Tasmanian state election
- 1996 Victorian state election
- 1996 Western Australian state election

== Europe ==
- 1996 Abkhazian parliamentary election
- Albania:
  - 1996 Albanian parliamentary election
  - 1996 Albanian local elections
- 1996 Armenian presidential election
- 1995–1996 Azerbaijani parliamentary election
- 1996 Belarusian referendum
- 1996 Bosnian general election
- Bulgarian presidential election
- 1996 Czech legislative election
- 1996 Czech Senate election
- 1996 Estonian presidential election
- 1996 Finnish local elections
- 1996 Gibraltar general election
- 1996 Greek legislative election
- 1996 Icelandic presidential election
- 1996 Italian general election
- Italian general election, 1996 (Veneto)
- 1996 Jersey general election
- 1996 Latvian presidential election
- 1996 Lithuanian parliamentary election
- 1996 Lithuanian constitutional referendum
- 1996 Maltese general election
- 1996 Montenegrin parliamentary election
- 1996 Portuguese presidential election
- 1996 Portuguese regional elections
- 1996 Romanian local elections
- 1996 Romanian presidential election
- 1996 Romanian legislative election
- 1996 Slovenian parliamentary election
- 1996 Yugoslavian parliamentary election

=== Austria ===
- 1996 Burgenland state election
- 1996 European Parliament election in Austria

=== European Parliament ===
After 1995 enlargement of the European Union:

- 1996 European Parliament election in Austria
- 1996 European Parliament election in Finland

=== Germany ===
- 1996 Rhineland-Palatinate state election
- 1996 Baden-Württemberg state election (de)
- 1996 Schleswig-Holstein state election (de)

=== Moldova ===
- 1996 Moldovan presidential election
- 1996 Transnistrian presidential election

=== Russia ===
- Elections in Astrakhan Oblast
- Krasnodar Krai Head of Administration elections
- 1996 Russian presidential election

=== Spain ===
- 1996 Spanish general election

=== United Kingdom ===
- 1996 Barnsley East by-election
- 1996 Hemsworth by-election
- 1996 South East Staffordshire by-election

==== United Kingdom local ====
- 1996 United Kingdom local elections

===== English local =====
- 1996 Manchester Council election
- 1996 Stevenage Council election
- 1996 Trafford Council election
- 1996 Wolverhampton Council election

== Japan ==
- 1996 Japanese general election

== North America ==
- 1996–1997 Belizean municipal elections
- 1995–96 Guatemalan general election
- 1996 Nicaraguan general election

=== Canada ===
- 1996 British Columbia general election
- 1996 Newfoundland general election
- 1996 Ontario Liberal Party leadership election
- 1996 Prince Edward Island Liberal Party leadership election
- 1996 Progressive Conservative Party of Prince Edward Island leadership election
- 1996 Prince Edward Island general election
- 1996 Vancouver municipal election
- 1996 Yukon general election

=== Caribbean ===
- 1996 Caymanian general election
- 1996 Dominican Republic presidential election
- 1996 Montserratian general election
- 1996 Puerto Rican general election
- 1996 Tobago House of Assembly election
- 1996 Trinidad and Tobago local election

=== United States ===
- 1996 United States elections
- 1996 United States presidential election

==== United States lieutenant gubernatorial ====
- 1996 Arkansas lieutenant gubernatorial special election
- 1996 Delaware lieutenant gubernatorial election
- 1996 Missouri lieutenant gubernatorial election
- 1996 North Carolina lieutenant gubernatorial election

==== United States mayoral elections ====
- 1996 Baton Rouge mayoral election
- 1996 Fresno mayoral election
- 1996 Irvine mayoral election
- 1996 Miami mayoral special election
- 1996 Milwaukee mayoral election
- 1996 Orlando mayoral election
- 1996 Portland, Oregon, mayoral election
- 1996 San Diego mayoral election

==== United States gubernatorial ====
- 1996 Delaware gubernatorial election
- 1996 Indiana gubernatorial election
- 1996 Missouri gubernatorial election
- 1996 Montana gubernatorial election
- 1996 New Hampshire gubernatorial election
- 1996 North Carolina gubernatorial election
- 1996 North Dakota gubernatorial election
- 1996 Utah gubernatorial election
- 1996 Vermont gubernatorial election
- 1996 Washington gubernatorial election
- 1996 West Virginia gubernatorial election

==== Alabama ====
- United States Senate election in Alabama, 1996

==== Arizona ====
- United States presidential election in Arizona, 1996

==== Arkansas ====
- 1996 Arkansas lieutenant gubernatorial special election
- United States presidential election in Arkansas, 1996

==== California ====
- 1996 California State Assembly elections
- 1996 California state elections
- 1996 San Francisco Board of Supervisors elections
- 1996 California State Senate elections
- United States House of Representatives elections in California, 1996

==== Delaware ====
- 1996 Delaware lieutenant gubernatorial election
- United States Senate election in Delaware, 1996

==== Georgia ====
- United States House of Representatives elections in Georgia, 1996
- United States Senate election in Georgia, 1996

==== Idaho ====
- United States Senate election in Idaho, 1996

==== Illinois ====
- United States Senate election in Illinois, 1996

==== Kansas ====
- United States Senate election in Kansas, 1996

==== Louisiana ====
- United States Senate election in Louisiana, 1996

==== Maine ====
- United States Senate election in Maine, 1996
- United States presidential election in Maine, 1996

==== Missouri ====
- 1996 Missouri lieutenant gubernatorial election

==== Montana ====
- United States Senate election in Montana, 1996

==== North Carolina ====
- 1996 North Carolina judicial elections
- 1996 North Carolina lieutenant gubernatorial election
- 1996 North Carolina Council of State elections
- 1996 North Carolina gubernatorial election
- United States House of Representatives elections in North Carolina, 1996
- United States Senate election in North Carolina, 1996
- United States presidential election in North Carolina, 1996

==== Oregon ====
- United States Senate special election in Oregon, 1996

==== Puerto Rico ====
- 1996 Puerto Rican general election

==== South Carolina ====
- United States House of Representatives elections in South Carolina, 1996

==== Tennessee ====
- United States Senate election in Tennessee, 1996

==== United States House of Representatives ====
- United States House of Representatives elections in Georgia, 1996
- United States House of Representatives elections in South Carolina, 1996
- United States House of Representatives elections in California, 1996
- 1996 United States House of Representatives elections

==== United States Senate ====
- 1996 United States Senate elections
- United States Senate election in Georgia, 1996
- United States Senate election in Alabama, 1996
- United States Senate election in Alaska, 1996
- United States Senate election in Arkansas, 1996
- United States Senate election in Colorado, 1996
- United States Senate election in Delaware, 1996
- United States Senate election in Idaho, 1996
- United States Senate election in Illinois, 1996
- United States Senate election in Iowa, 1996
- United States Senate election in Kansas, 1996
- United States Senate election in Kentucky, 1996
- United States Senate election in Louisiana, 1996
- United States Senate election in Maine, 1996
- United States Senate election in Massachusetts, 1996
- United States Senate election in Minnesota, 1996
- United States Senate election in Mississippi, 1996
- United States Senate election in Montana, 1996
- United States Senate election in Nebraska, 1996
- United States Senate election in New Jersey, 1996
- United States Senate election in North Carolina, 1996
- United States Senate special election in Oregon, 1996
- United States Senate election in Oregon, 1996
- United States Senate election in Rhode Island, 1996
- United States Senate election in South Carolina, 1996
- United States Senate election in South Dakota, 1996
- United States Senate election in Tennessee, 1996
- United States Senate election in Virginia, 1996
- United States Senate election in Wyoming, 1996

==== Utah ====
- United States presidential election in Utah, 1996

==== Virginia ====
- United States Senate election in Virginia, 1996

==== Washington (U.S. state) ====
- 1996 Washington gubernatorial election

==== West Virginia ====
- United States Senate election in West Virginia, 1996

==== Wyoming ====
- United States Senate election in Wyoming, 1996

== Oceania ==
- 1996 Niuean general election
- 1996 Palauan general election
- 1996 Palauan constitutional referendum
- 1996 Samoan general election
- 1996 Tongan general election

=== Australia ===
- 1996 Australian federal election
- 1996 Blaxland by-election
- 1996 Clarence state by-election
- 1996 Lindsay by-election
- 1996 Mundingburra state by-election
- 1996 Orange state by-election
- 1996 Pittwater state by-election
- 1996 Port Macquarie state by-election
- 1996 Southern Highlands state by-election
- 1996 Strathfield state by-election
- 1996 Tasmanian state election
- 1996 Victorian state election
- 1996 Western Australian state election

=== New Zealand ===
==== New Zealand general ====
- 1996 New Zealand general election

=== New Zealand general ===
- 1996 New Zealand general election

== South America ==
- 1996 Ecuadorian general election
- 1996 Surinamese general election
- 1996 Uruguayan constitutional referendum
