= 1996 United States Senate election in Montana =

- November 5, 1996
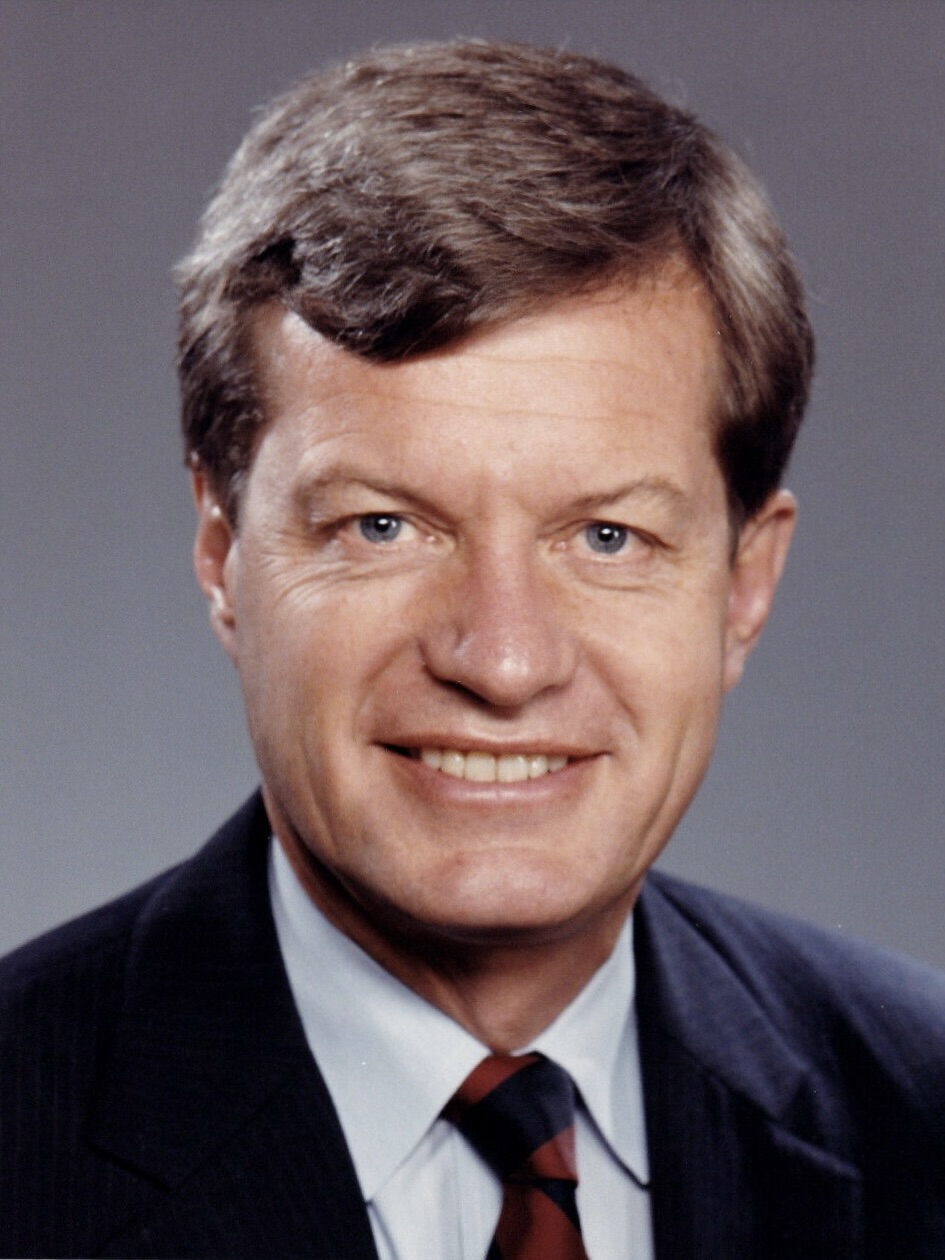

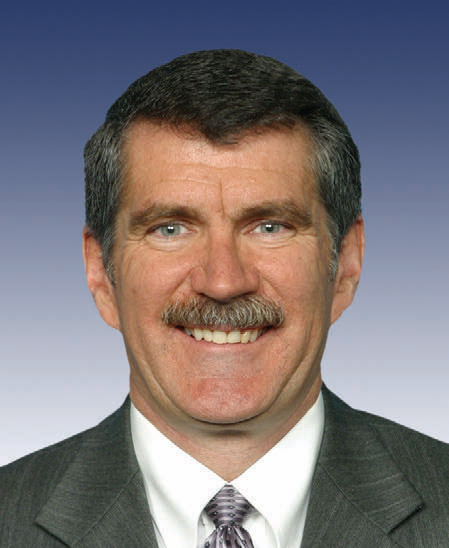
Nominee	Max Baucus	Denny Rehberg
Party	Democratic	Republican
Popular vote	201,935	182,111
Percentage	49.56%	44.69%
- County results Baucus: 40–50% 50–60% 60–70% 70–80% Rehberg: 40–50% 50–60% 60–70% 70–80%
U.S. senator before election
Max Baucus
Democratic
Elected U.S. Senator
Max Baucus
Democratic

The 1996 United States Senate election in Montana took place on November 5, 1996. Incumbent United States Senator Max Baucus, who was first elected in 1978 and was re-elected in 1984 and 1990, ran for re-election. He was unopposed in the Democratic primary, and moved on to the general election, where he faced a stiff challenge in Denny Rehberg, the Lieutenant Governor of Montana and the Republican nominee. Despite Bob Dole's victory over Bill Clinton and Ross Perot in the state that year in the presidential election, Baucus managed to narrowly win re-election over Rehberg to secure a fourth term in the Senate.

== Democratic primary ==
=== Candidates ===
- Max Baucus, incumbent United States Senator

=== Results ===
Democratic Party primary results
Party	Candidate	Votes	%
Democratic	Max Baucus (incumbent)	85,976	100.00%
Total votes		85,976	100.00%

== Reform primary ==
=== Candidates ===
- Becky Shaw, student loan investigator and 1994 candidate for the Democratic Senate nomination
- Webb Sullivan, retired railroad worker

=== Results ===
Reform Party Primary results
Party	Candidate	Votes	%
Reform	Becky Shaw	930	68.03%
Reform	Webb Sullivan	437	31.97%
Total votes		1,367	100.00%

== Republican primary ==
=== Candidates ===
- Denny Rehberg, Lieutenant Governor of Montana
- Ed Borcherdt, businessman
- John K. McDonald, former State Senator

=== Results ===
Republican Primary results
Party	Candidate	Votes	%
Republican	Denny Rehberg	82,158	73.81%
Republican	Ed Borcherdt	14,670	13.18%
Republican	John K. McDonald	14,485	13.01%
Total votes		111,313	100.00%

== General election ==
=== Results ===
United States Senate election in Montana, 1996
Party	Candidate	Votes	%	±%
Democratic	Max Baucus (incumbent)	201,935	49.56%	−18.57%
Republican	Denny Rehberg	182,111	44.69%	+15.31%
Reform	Becky Shaw	19,276	4.73%	
Natural Law	Stephen Heaton	4,168	1.02%	
Majority		19,824	4.86%	−33.88%
Turnout		407,490		
Democratic hold		Swing		

== See also ==
- 1996 United States Senate elections
