= 1990 United States Senate election in Montana =

- November 6, 1990
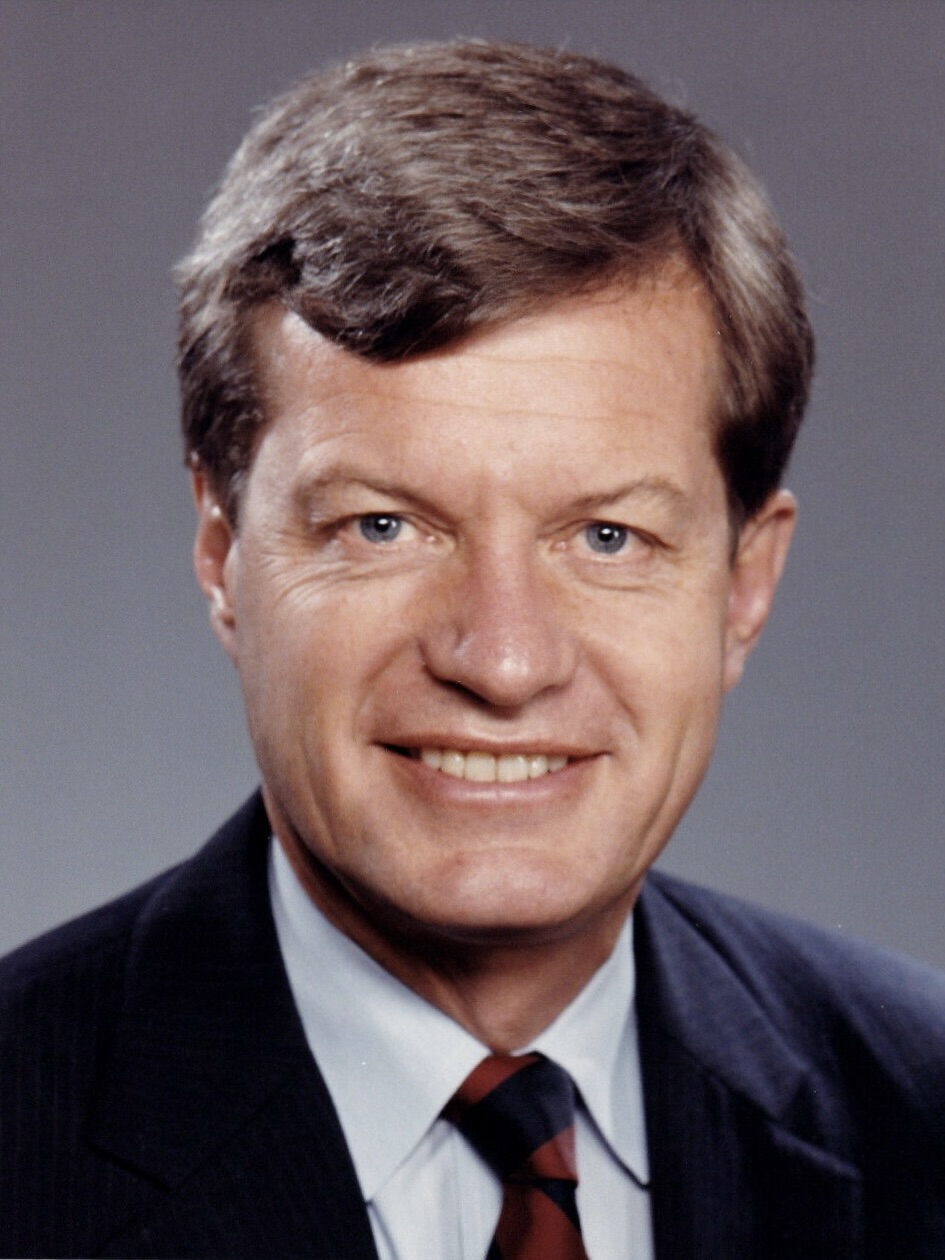

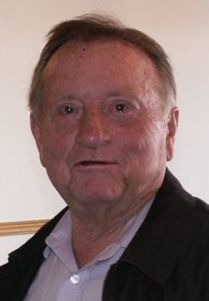
Nominee	Max Baucus	Allen Kolstad
Party	Democratic	Republican
Popular vote	217,563	93,836
Percentage	68.13%	29.38%
- Baucus: 50–60% 60–70% 70–80% 80–90% Kolstad: 40–50%
U.S. senator before election
Max Baucus
Democratic
Elected U.S. Senator
Max Baucus
Democratic

The 1990 United States Senate election in Montana took place on November 6, 1990. Incumbent United States Senator Max Baucus, who was first elected in 1978 and was re-elected in 1984, ran for re-election. After winning the Democratic primary, he moved on to the general election, where he was opposed by Allen Kolstad, the Lieutenant Governor of Montana and the Republican nominee. Baucus ultimately ended up defeating Kolstad in a landslide, winning his third term with ease.

== Democratic primary ==
=== Candidates ===
- Max Baucus, incumbent United States Senator
- John Driscoll, former Speaker of the Montana House of Representatives
- "Curly" Thornton

=== Results ===
Democratic Party primary results
Party	Candidate	Votes	%
Democratic	Max Baucus (incumbent)	80,622	82.60%
Democratic	John Driscoll	12,616	12.93%
Democratic	"Curly" Thornton	4,367	4.47%
Total votes		97,605	100.00%

== Republican primary ==
=== Candidates ===
- Allen Kolstad, Lieutenant Governor of Montana
- Bruce Vorhauer, businessman
- Bill Farrell
- John Domenech

=== Results ===
Republican Primary results
Party	Candidate	Votes	%
Republican	Allen Kolstad	38,097	43.59%
Republican	Bruce Vorhauer	30,837	35.28%
Republican	Bill Farrell	11,820	13.52%
Republican	John Domenech	6,648	7.61%
Total votes		87,402	100.00%

== General election ==
=== Results ===
United States Senate election in Montana, 1990
Party	Candidate	Votes	%	±%
Democratic	Max Baucus (incumbent)	217,563	68.13%	+11.24%
Republican	Allen Kolstad	93,836	29.38%	−11.31%
Libertarian	Westley F. Deitchler	7,937	2.49%	+0.07%
Majority		123,727	38.75%	+22.55%
Turnout		319,336		
Democratic hold		Swing		

==== By congressional district ====
Baucus won both congressional districts, including one that elected a Republican.

District	Baucus	Kolstad	Representative
1st	66%	31%	Pat Williams
2nd	71%	27%	Ron Marlenee

== See also ==
- 1990 United States Senate elections
