= List of members of the European Parliament for Austria, 1995–1996 =

This is a list of the 21 appointed delegates to the European Parliament for Austria (from 1 January 1995 until 12 October 1996), ordered by name. The first Austrian MEP elections were held on 13 October 1996.

== List ==
Name	National party	EP Group
Herbert Bösch	Social Democratic Party	PES
Irene Crepaz	Social Democratic Party	PES
Erich Farthofer	Social Democratic Party	PES
Ilona Graenitz	Social Democratic Party	PES
Martina Gredler	Liberal Forum	ELDR
Hilde Hawlicek	Social Democratic Party	PES
Elisabeth Hlavac	Social Democratic Party	PES
Wolfgang Jung	Freedom Party	NI
Albrecht Konecny	Social Democratic Party	PES
Friedrich König	People's Party	EPP
Franz Linser	Freedom Party	NI
Milan Linzer	People's Party	EPP
Klaus Lukas	Freedom Party	NI
Erhard Meier	Social Democratic Party	PES
Wolfgang Nußbaumer	Freedom Party	NI
Reinhard Rack	People's Party	EPP
Paul Rübig	People's Party	EPP
Agnes Schierhuber	People's Party	EPP
Erich Schreiner	Freedom Party	NI
Michael Spindelegger	People's Party	EPP
Johannes Voggenhuber	The Greens–The Green Alternative	GG
