= 1996 Dade County mayoral election =

- September 3, 1996; October 1, 1996

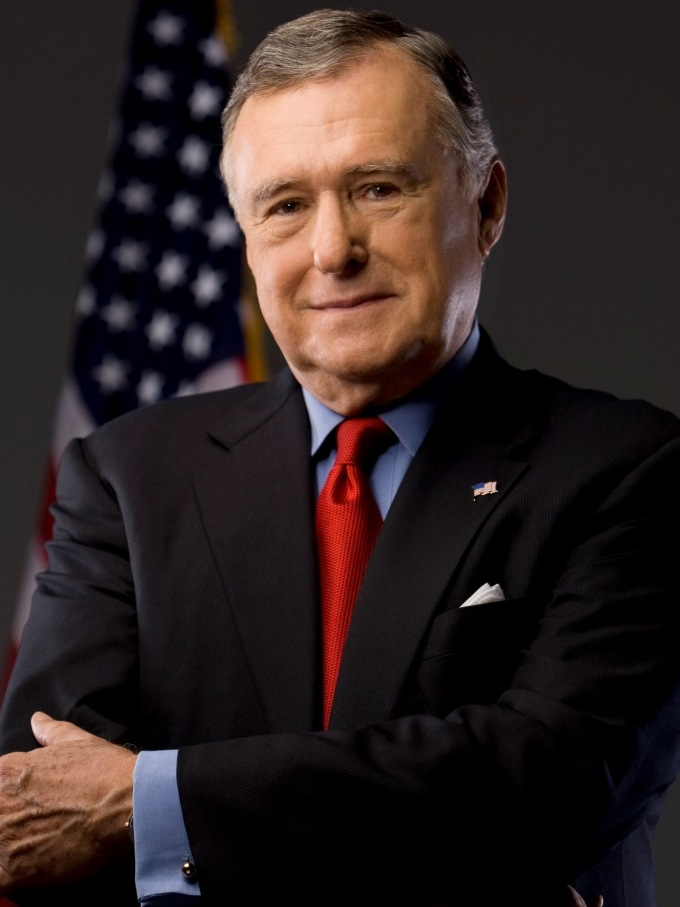

Candidate	Alex Penelas	Arthur Teele
First round	97,968; 36.78%	67,240; 25.25%
Runoff	197,797; 60.56%	128,818; 39.44%
Candidate	Maurice Ferré	Xavier Suarez
First round	55,239; 20.74%	36,725; 13.79%
Runoff	Eliminated	Eliminated
Mayor before election
Position established
Elected mayor
Alex Penelas
Nonpartisan

The 1996 Dade County mayoral election took place on October 1, 1996, following a primary election on September 3, 1996. The election was the first one to take place following an October 1992 referendum that established the office following the 1992 abolition of the previous mayoral position, which was largely ceremonial. Eleven candidates ran in the formally nonpartisan election, and the leading candidates were County Commissioners Alex Penelas, Arthur Teele, and Maurice Ferré, as well as former Miami Mayor Xavier Suarez. Penelas placed first in the primary with 37 percent of the vote, and advanced to a runoff election against Teele, who placed second with 25 percent. In the runoff election, Penelas defeated Teele in a landslide, winning 61 percent of the vote to Teele's 39 percent.

== Primary election ==
=== Candidates ===
- Alex Penelas, County Commissioner
- Arthur Teele, Chairman of the County Commission
- Maurice Ferré, County Commissioner, former Mayor of Miami
- Xavier Suarez, former Mayor of Miami
- William Perry, former director of the Miami Sports and Exhibition Authority
- Charles F. Knapp, Jr., pharmacist
- Clennon King, self-proclaimed rabbi, Dean of the Arenia Mallory School of Religion
- Rachele Fruit, Socialist Workers Party activist
- Juan Michael Alfonso, accountant, 1993 candidate for Mayor of Hialeah
- Manny Gonzalez-Goenaga, investor
- Dori De Falco, investor

=== Campaign ===
Some political analysts speculated that Perry had likely ran at Penelas's behest, doing so in hope that he might draw some support of black voters away from Teele. Both Perry and Teele were black.

=== Results ===
1996 Dade County mayoral primary election
Party	Candidate	Votes	%
Nonpartisan	Alex Penelas	97,968	36.78%
Nonpartisan	Arthur Teele	67,240	25.25%
Nonpartisan	Maurice Ferré	55,239	20.74%
Nonpartisan	Xavier Suarez	36,725	13.79%
Nonpartisan	William Perry	4,243	1.59%
Nonpartisan	Charles F. Knapp, Jr.	1,662	0.62%
Nonpartisan	Clennon King	913	0.34%
Nonpartisan	Rachele Fruit	741	0.28%
Nonpartisan	Juan Miguel Alfonso	636	0.24%
Nonpartisan	Manny Gonzalez-Goenaga	535	0.20%
Nonpartisan	Dori De Falco	429	0.16%
Total votes		266,331	100.00%

== Runoff election ==
=== Results ===
1996 Dade County mayoral runoff election
Party	Candidate	Votes	%
Nonpartisan	Alex Penelas	197,797	60.56%
Nonpartisan	Arthur Teele	128,818	39.44%
Total votes		326,615	100.00%

== See also ==
- 1996 Miami mayoral special election –city of Miami mayoral election held the same year
