= European Parliament election, 1996 =

European Parliament election, 1996 may refer to:

- 1996 European Parliament election in Austria
- 1996 European Parliament election in Finland
