= Max Baucus =

American politician (born 1941)

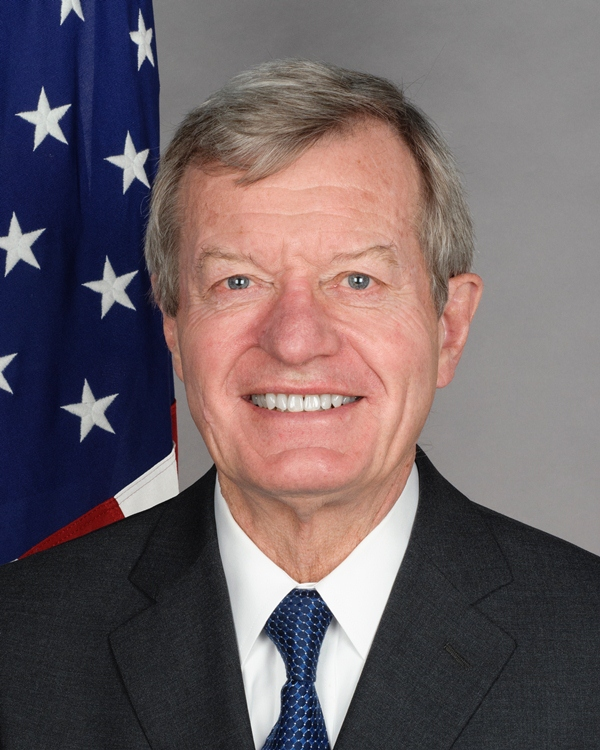
- Official portrait, 2014

11th United States Ambassador to China
- In office March 20, 2014 – January 16, 2017
- President: Barack Obama
- Preceded by: Gary Locke
- Succeeded by: Terry Branstad

United States Senator from Montana
- In office December 15, 1978 – February 6, 2014
- Preceded by: Paul Hatfield
- Succeeded by: John Walsh
Senate positions
Chair of the Senate Finance Committee
In office January 4, 2007 – February 6, 2014
Preceded by	Chuck Grassley
Succeeded by	Ron Wyden
In office June 6, 2001 – January 3, 2003
Preceded by	Chuck Grassley
Succeeded by	Chuck Grassley
In office January 3, 2001 – January 20, 2001
Preceded by	William Roth
Succeeded by	Chuck Grassley
Chair of the Senate Environment Committee
In office January 3, 1993 – January 3, 1995
Preceded by	Daniel Patrick Moynihan
Succeeded by	John Chafee

Member of the U.S. House of Representatives from Montana's 1st district
- In office January 3, 1975 – December 14, 1978
- Preceded by: Richard Shoup
- Succeeded by: Pat Williams

Personal details
- Born: Maxwell Sieben Enke; December 11, 1941 (age 84) Helena, Montana, U.S.
- Party: Democratic
- Spouses: Ann Geracimos (m. 1975; div. 1982); Wanda Minge (m. 1984; div. 2009); Melodee Hanes (m. 2011)
- Children: 1
- Education: Carleton College (attended); Stanford University (BA, JD)
- Baucus's voice Baucus on Medicare reform legislation. Recorded July 9, 2008

Maxwell Sieben Baucus (né Enke; born December 11, 1941) is an American politician who served as a United States senator from Montana from 1978 to 2014. A member of the Democratic Party, he was a U.S. senator for over 35 years, making him the longest-serving U.S. senator in Montana history. President Barack Obama later appointed Baucus to replace Gary Locke as the 11th U.S. ambassador to the People's Republic of China, a position he held from 2014 until 2017.

As the chairman of the Senate Committee on Finance, Baucus played an influential role in the debate over health care reform in the United States. He was also chairman of the Joint Committee on Taxation, a member of the Senate Committee on Agriculture, Nutrition and Forestry and the Senate Committee on Environment and Public Works, and was chairman of the Subcommittee on Transportation and Infrastructure. Before his election to the Senate, Baucus was a member of the United States House of Representatives from 1975 to 1978, representing Montana's 1st congressional district. He previously served in the Montana House of Representatives from 1973 to 1974. His career included charges of conflicts of interest due to his ties to the health insurance and pharmaceutical industries, and his nomination of his girlfriend to be a US Attorney.

== Early life and education ==
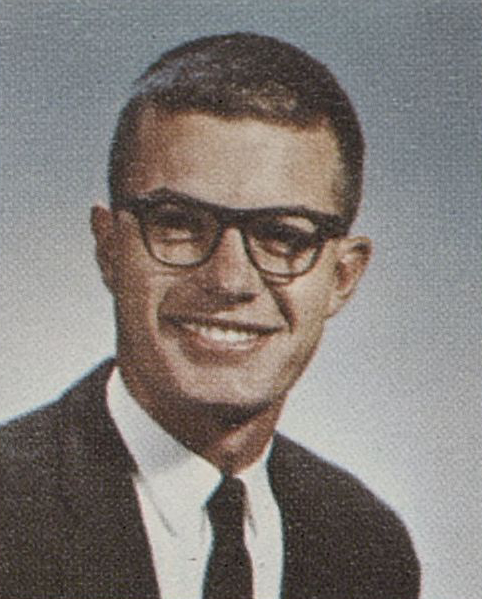
Baucus in the Stanford University yearbook, 1964

Maxwell Sieben Enke was born on December 11, 1941, in Helena, Montana, to historian and rancher Jean Sheriff (1917–2011) and Stephen Enke (1916–1974), a demographer and economist. His father, born in British Columbia, Canada, was of German and Scottish descent, and his mother had English and German ancestry. Baucus lived in Los Angeles, California, until he was two, when his mother left his father and returned to Helena.

His mother later married John J. Baucus, and she and her son, Max, took his surname. Baucus graduated from Helena High School in 1959.

After attending local public schools in his hometown of Helena, he attended Carleton College in Minnesota for a year. He then transferred to Stanford University, where he received a Bachelor of Arts degree in economics in 1964, and was a member of the Sigma Alpha Epsilon fraternity. After graduating, he attended Stanford Law School and graduated with a Juris Doctor in 1967.

== Early career ==
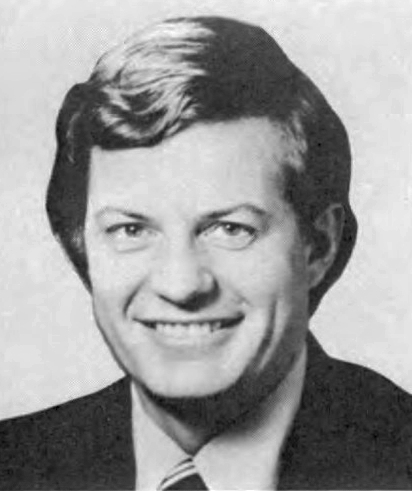
Baucus during his time in the House of Representatives

After finishing law school, Baucus spent two years working as a staff attorney for the Civil Aeronautics Board and then two years as a lawyer at the Securities and Exchange Commission in Washington, D.C. He moved back to his native Montana in 1971 to serve as the executive director of the state's Constitutional Convention, opening a law office in Missoula, Montana. In November 1972, Baucus was elected to the Montana House of Representatives as a state representative from Missoula. In November 1974 he was elected to the United States House of Representatives, and he was re-elected in 1976.

== U.S. Senate ==
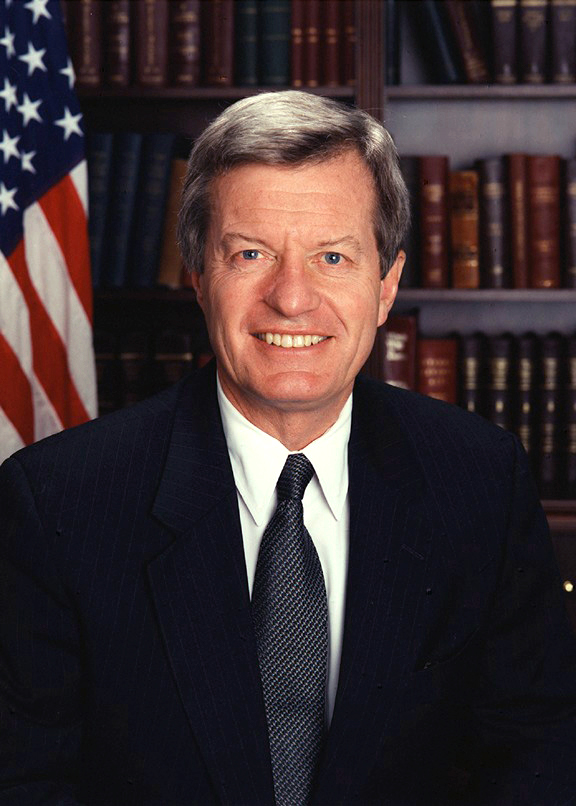
Baucus during his tenure in the U.S. Senate

Baucus was elected to the United States Senate on November 7, 1978, for the term beginning January 3, 1979, but was subsequently appointed to the seat by Montana's Democratic Governor Thomas Lee Judge on December 15, 1978, to fill the brief vacancy created by Senator Paul G. Hatfield's resignation. On April 23, 2013, a Democratic official confirmed that Baucus would not seek a seventh term.

=== Committee assignments ===
- Committee on Agriculture, Nutrition and Forestry
  - Subcommittee on Domestic and Foreign Marketing, Inspection, and Plant and Animal Health
  - Subcommittee on Production, Income Protection and Price Support
  - Subcommittee on Hunger, Nutrition and Family Farms
- Committee on Finance (Chairman)
  - As Chairman of the full committee, Baucus may serve as an ex officio member of all subcommittees of which he is not already a full member.
  - Subcommittee on Taxation, IRS Oversight, and Long-term Growth
  - Subcommittee on Fiscal Responsibility and Economic Growth
- Committee on Environment and Public Works
  - Subcommittee on Clean Air and Nuclear Safety
  - Subcommittee on Superfund, Toxics and Environmental Health
  - Subcommittee on Transportation and Infrastructure (Chairman)
- Joint Committee on Taxation (Chairman)
- Joint Select Committee on Deficit Reduction

== Political positions ==
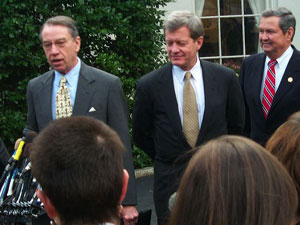
Senator Chuck Grassley (left) and Representative Clay Shaw (right) with Baucus at the White House

As a Democratic member of the Senate, Baucus was conservative, and frequently broke with his party on the issues of taxes, the environment, health care, and gun control. The web site That's My Congress gives him a 23 percent rating on progressive issues it tracks. NARAL Pro-Choice America's political action committee endorsed Baucus during his 2008 election campaign.

=== Civil rights ===
The American Civil Liberties Union gave Baucus a 60 percent rating in December 2002, indicating a mixed civil rights voting record.

==== LGBT rights ====
In 2006, the Human Rights Campaign (HRC) gave Baucus a 67% overall rating indicating having a mixed record on voting for gay rights. In 1996, Baucus voted in favor of the Defense of Marriage Act (DOMA) which prohibited "marriage between members of the same sex in federal law, and provide that no state is required to recognize same-sex marriages performed in other states" and defined marriage as being between a single man and a single woman. However, in 2004 he voted against the proposed constitutional amendment banning same-sex marriage, and in June 2012 he definitively spoke out in support for same-sex marriage. He has supported measures to curb job discrimination and hate crimes based on sexual orientation. He voted in favor of the Don't Ask, Don't Tell Repeal Act of 2010.

==== Tobacco tax extension ====
In 2012, Baucus added to a transportation bill in Congress that extended the regulations covering cigarette manufacturers to "roll your own cigarette" stores that operate mass cigarette rolling machines.

==== Voting rights for Washington, D.C. ====
Baucus voted against giving voting representation to the District of Columbia.

=== Economic issues ===
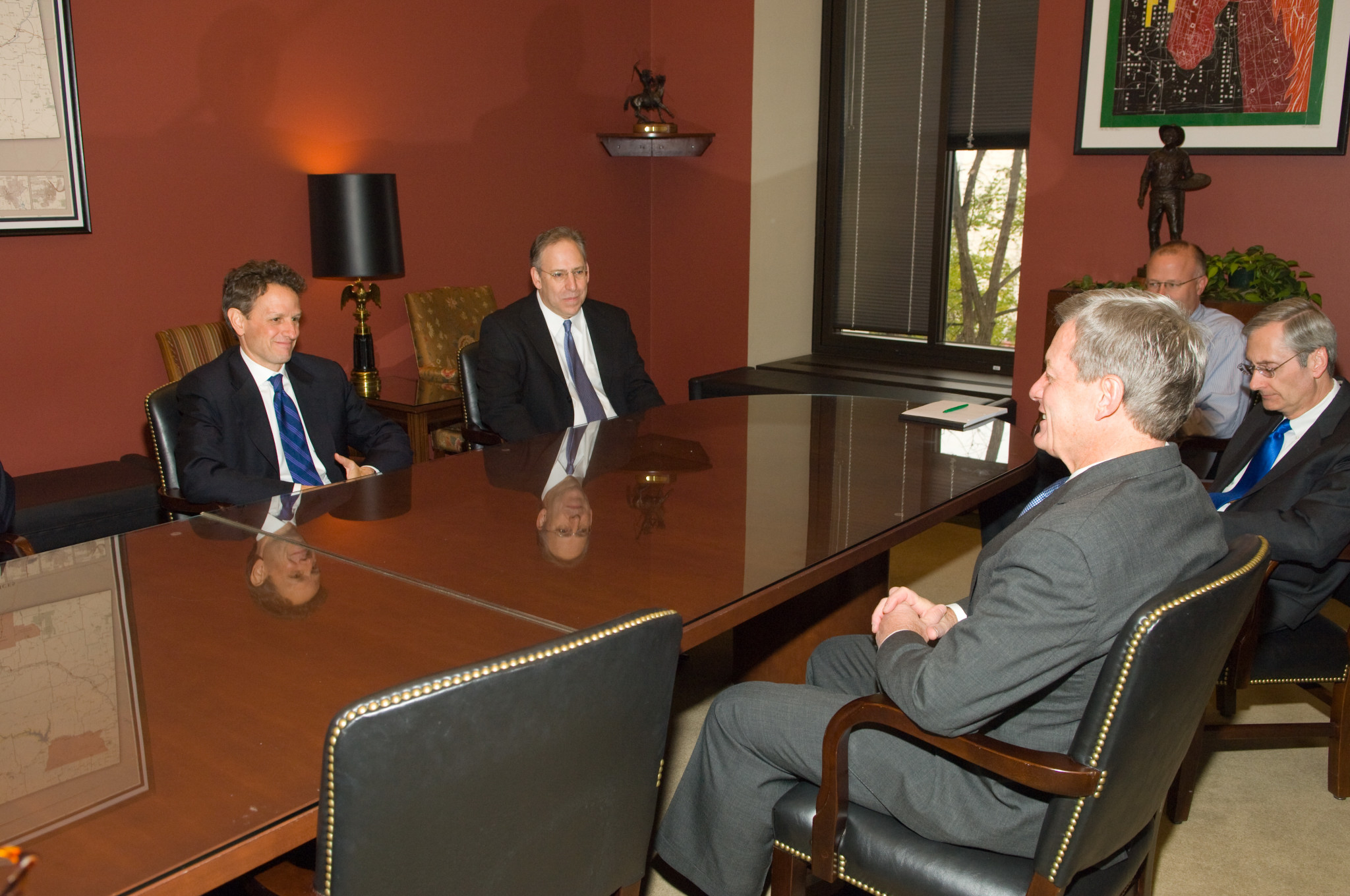
Baucus (foreground) meets with Secretary of Treasury nominee Timothy Geithner (left) in 2008.

Baucus has a 74% pro-business voting record as rated by the U.S. Chamber of Commerce. He twice voted to make filing bankruptcy more difficult for debtors, once in July 2001 to restrict rules on personal bankruptcy, and a second time in March 2005 to include means-testing and restrictions for bankruptcy filers. He has frequently visited places of employment within the state and has personally participated in activities that he calls "Work Days".

Baucus voted for the Bush tax cuts in 2001. He has usually voted against repealing portions of that bill and against repealing more recent tax cut bills that benefit upper income taxpayers. In 2008, he voted in favor of permanently repealing the estate tax.

In March 2005, Baucus voted against repealing tax subsidies benefiting companies that outsource U.S. jobs offshore. On January 4, 2007, he wrote an editorial in the Wall Street Journal calling on Democrats to renew President George W. Bush's fast-track authority for international trade deals. In response, the Montana State Senate passed a resolution, 44-6, "that the U.S. Congress be urged to create a replacement for the outdated fast track system".

On October 27, 2009, he introduced the Foreign Account Tax Compliance Act of 2009 to Congress together with Representative Charles Rangel.

On August 9, 2011, Senate Majority Leader Harry Reid appointed Baucus to the United States Congress Joint Select Committee on Deficit Reduction.

=== Environmental issues ===
Baucus's environmental record in Congress was mixed. He supported Democratic leadership in voting against oil and gas subsidies and Arctic National Wildlife Refuge drilling, as well as by voting in favor of national standards to reduce oil consumption and spur the use of hydrogen-powered cars. But he voted against the corporate average fuel economy standards (CAFE) and on increasing federal funds for solar and wind power. He was a leader in the massive Montana Legacy Project conservation project. The League of Conservation Voters (LCV) gave Baucus a 79% rating for 2012; Baucus's lifetime LCV rating is 68%.

=== Foreign affairs ===
==== Cuba ====
As a senator, Baucus opposed the United States embargo against Cuba and travel restrictions.

==== Iraq War ====
Baucus voted for the Authorization for Use of Military Force Against Iraq Resolution of 2002. He voted with a majority of Democrats against Senator John Kerry's amendment stipulating a firm deadline for withdrawal of American combat personnel from Iraq.

On July 29, 2006, Baucus's nephew Marine Cpl. Phillip E. Baucus was killed in combat in Al Anbar Governorate. Phillip, a 28-year-old resident of Wolf Creek, Montana, had been a member of the 3rd Light Armored Reconnaissance Battalion, 1st Marine Division, I Marine Expeditionary Force.

On January 10, 2007, the day of President Bush's address on his plan to increase troop levels in Iraq, Baucus spoke against the increases and called for a phased withdrawal of U.S. troops.

==== Israel ====
Baucus was one of the Senate's largest career recipients of pro-Israel Political Action Committee (PAC) contributions, receiving $550,589 since 1989.

==== Japan ====
Baucus went on a trade mission in Japan, inspecting the Tesla Motors facility in Tokyo, saying "Tesla is a great example of how exports and trade help the U.S. economy and create good-paying jobs at home in America. Our trade ties overseas help Tesla sell a world-class product that's manufactured in the U.S. by top-notch American workers," Baucus said. "There are millions of consumers in Japan and across the Pacific ready to buy more American-made goods, and we can continue to open those markets and boost U.S. exports with an aggressive trade agenda."

==== Vietnam ====
On July 14, 2009, The Wall Street Journal published an editorial on Baucus's attitude over Vietnam's "tra" and "basa" pangasius, saying there was no reason for America to launch a trade war with Vietnam over fish. "He's dead right about a trade issue now percolating in Washington," said the newspaper. The article, entitled "Max Baucus's Fish Sense – Protectionism often hurts the protectionist", outlined this controversial topic in Washington and underlined the possibility that the U.S. Department of Agriculture (USDA) could effectively ban imports from Vietnam of pangasius fish, which are similar to U.S.-produced catfish.

The ostensible reason for the move would be food safety and the USDA is considering whether Vietnamese fish should be subject to a stricter safety inspection regime. But the article noted that there have been no reported cases of Vietnamese fish making American consumers sick and the proposed inspections would be onerous. It quoted Baucus as telling Congress Daily, "If we expect other countries to follow the rules and drop these restrictions, it is critical that we play by the rules and do not block imports for arbitrary or unscientific reasons."

=== Gun policy ===
In 1994, Baucus cast a pivotal vote in favor of Senator Dianne Feinstein's "Assault Weapons" Ban.

In 1999, Baucus was the only Democrat to have voted against an amendment by Senator Frank Lautenberg that sought to "regulate the sale of firearms at gun shows"— after the Columbine High School massacre.

In 2013, Baucus was one of four Democrats to vote against the Manchin-Toomey Amendment to expand background checks for potential gun buyers. He is an avid hunter.

In 2014, Baucus cast one of only four Democratic votes against universal gun show background checks. The Progressive Change Campaign Committee ran ads in Montana saying: "Senator Baucus, it was WRONG to vote 'no' on stopping gun violence. 79% of Montana voters support background checks. Stand with us, not gun manufacturers." The group planned to spend money to unseat Baucus over his vote on gun control in the 2014 election, but he chose not to seek reelection.

=== Health care reform ===
In 2013, Baucus was criticized for his comments concerning the implementation of Obamacare provisions specifically stating it could turn into a "train-wreck". He feared that the changes and their specific implementations would have a negative impact on small business owners stating "When I am home, small businesses have no idea what to do, what to expect. They don't know what affordability rules are; they don't know when penalties may apply. They just don't know. While Baucus was very supportive of the intent of the new legislation saying "I spent two years of my life working on the Affordable Care Act. There is nothing I want more than for it to succeed," he was very critical of the resulting rollout.

==== Senate finance committee ====
As chairman of the Senate Finance Committee, Baucus called the first Senate meeting of interested parties before the committee to discuss health care reform, including representatives from pharmaceutical groups, insurance companies, and HMOs and hospital management companies. Some viewed the meeting as controversial because it did not include representatives from groups calling for single-payer health care.

==== Opposition to single payer health care ====
Advocate groups attended a Senate Finance Committee meeting in May 2009 to protest their exclusion as well as statements by Baucus that "single payer was not an option on the table." Baucus later had eight protesters removed by police who arrested them for disrupting the hearing. Many of the single-payer advocates said it was a "pay to play" event. A representative of the Business Roundtable, which includes 35 memberships of health maintenance organizations, health insurance and pharmaceutical companies, admitted that other countries, with lower health costs, and higher quality of care, such as those with single-payer systems, have a competitive advantage over the United States with its private system.

At the next meeting on health care reform of the Senate Finance Committee, Baucus had five more doctors and nurses removed and arrested. Baucus admitted a few weeks later in June 2009 that it was a mistake to rule out a single payer plan because doing so alienated a large, vocal constituency and left President Barack Obama's proposal of a public health plan to compete with private insurers as the most liberal position.

Obama expressed deep frustration with Baucus regarding negotiations over the Affordable Care Act saying "A part of me wanted to get up, grab Baucus by the shoulders, and shake him till he came to his senses."

The Baucus-headed Finance Committee has been singled out by advocates and news organizations as the toughest obstacle for the President’s health care priorities. Containing more moderate and conservative members may not be the only reason. The committee is packed with lawmakers who have close ties to the health care and insurance industries, receiving large campaign contributions as their former staffers turn around to lobby for the very interests whose issues — in this case health care — they previously worked on. Baucus, as chair, stands out in particular.

— Paul Blumenthal, "The Max Baucus Health Care Lobbyist Complex" (22 June 2009), Sunlight Foundation

Baucus has used the term "uniquely American solution" to describe the end point of current health reform and has said he believes America is not ready yet for any form of single payer health care. This is the same term the insurance trade association, America's Health Insurance Plans (AHIP), is using. AHIP has launched the Campaign for an American Solution, which argues for the use of private health insurance instead of a government backed program. Critics have said Medicare is already effectively a single-payer system.

Years after his departure from the Senate, Baucus said it would make sense to seriously consider a single-payer system.

== Conflicts of interest ==
=== Ties to health insurance and pharmaceutical industries ===
Baucus has been criticized for his ties to the health insurance and pharmaceutical industries, and was one of the greatest beneficiaries in the Senate of campaign contributions from these industries. From 2003-08, Baucus received $3,973,485 from the health sector, including $852,813 from pharmaceutical companies, $851,141 from health professionals, $784,185 from the insurance industry, and $465,750 from HMOs/health services, according to OpenSecrets. A 2006 study by Public Citizen found that between 1999 and 2005 Baucus, along with former Senate majority leader Bill Frist, took in the most special-interest money of any senator.

Only three senators have more former staffers working as lobbyists on K Street, at least two dozen in Baucus's case. Several of Baucus's ex-staffers, including former chief of staff David Castagnetti, are now working for the pharmaceutical and health insurance industries. Castagnetti co-founded the lobbying firm of Mehlman Vogel Castagnetti, which represents America's Health Insurance Plans Inc, the national trade group of health insurance companies, the Medicare Cost Contractors Alliance, as well as Amgen, AstraZeneca, and Merck & Company. Another former chief of staff, Jeff Forbes, opened his own lobbying shop and to represent the Pharmaceutical Research and Manufacturers of America and the Advanced Medical Technology Association, among other groups.

A statistical analysis of the impact of political contributions on individual senators' support for the public insurance option conducted by Nate Silver has suggested that Baucus was an unlikely supporter of the public option in the first place. Based on Baucus's political ideology and the per capita health care spending in Montana, Silver's model projects that there would be only a 30.6% probability of Baucus supporting a public insurance option even if he had received no relevant campaign contributions. Silver calculates that the impact on Baucus of the significant campaign contributions that he has received from the health care industry further reduces the probability of his supporting a public insurance option from 30.6% to 0.6%.

In response to the questions raised by the large amount of funding he took from the health care industry, Baucus declared a moratorium as of July 1, 2009 on taking more special interest money from health care political action committees. Baucus, however, refused to return as part of his moratorium any of the millions of dollars he has received from health care industry interests before July 1, 2009, or to rule out a resumption of taking the same or greater health care industry contributions in the future. His policy on not taking health care industry money reportedly still allowed him to accept money from lobbyists or corporate executives, who, according to The Washington Post, continued to make donations after July 1, 2009.

A watchdog group found that in July 2009 Baucus accepted additional money from the health care industry in violation of his own self-defined moratorium terms, reportedly leading Baucus to return those monies.

In 2013, journalist Jonathan Cohn wrote in The New Republic: "It's not a huge exaggeration to say Baucus's career represents everything that is wrong with Washington." That year The New York Times reported that 28 former Baucus staffers had lobbied on tax issues during the Obama administration — the most of any member of Congress, and that on a regular basis Baucus would fly lobbyists to his ranch for weekend fundraisers.

=== Nomination of girlfriend for U.S. attorney ===
In 2008, Baucus, while he was still married to his second wife, nominated his girlfriend and state office director, Melodee Hanes, to the vacant position of U.S. attorney for Montana. The Wall Street Journal reported that, according to several people, he did not mention his relationship to the White House or to the attorney who tasked with reviewing candidates when he made the recommendation. Hanes then withdrew her nomination before the conflict of interest was discovered, because (according to Baucus) they wanted to be together in Washington, D.C. Both Baucus and Hanes had ended their marriages within the previous year; Hanes had met with the divorce lawyer of Baucus in 2007 at least twice, to discuss how the senator's work would be affected if he were to divorce his wife. Baucus said he was separated from his wife before he began seeing Hanes. Critics questioned whether he had misused his power to promote his lover and former aide. Marc Ambinder of The Atlantic wrote: "That Baucus would ignore the conflict of the interest or so easily dismiss it calls into question his judgment and his ethics. That's a scandal."

== Political campaigns ==
=== 2002 ===
The 2002 Montana elections got national attention when Baucus's opponent, state senator Mike Taylor, accused Baucus of having implied in a campaign ad that Taylor was gay. The ad was paid for by the Democratic Senatorial Campaign Committee, not by the Baucus campaign. The ad, which alleged that Taylor had embezzled funds from the cosmetology school he once owned, showed footage from the early 1980s of Taylor massaging another man's face while wearing a tight suit with an open shirt. Taylor dropped out of the race and Baucus won with 63 percent of the vote.

=== 2008 ===
Baucus sought re-election in 2008 in Montana, a state that has seen political change starting in 2004 when it elected Democratic Governor Brian Schweitzer and then in 2006 Democratic Senator Jon Tester by a slim margin. Montana was the only state in the U.S. to turn over a chamber of its legislature to Republican control in 2006. The legislative chamber had a one-seat Democratic majority that then became a one-seat Republican majority.

Baucus raised a record amount of money for his 2008 re-election bid, 91 percent of which came from individuals living outside of Montana. Similarly, according to OpenSecrets, Baucus's 2008 campaign raised $11.6 million, only 13 percent of which came from Montana donors; the rest included millions from health care and other industries overseen by Finance and Baucus's other committees.

So as Baucus and other lawmakers attempt to craft a bill that can smash through a virtual gridlock of interests, the awkward question lingers: to whom are they more attentive, their voting constituencies back home or the dollar constituencies who are at the Capitol every day?

As a result of Baucus's significant fund-raising advantage, in the week he announced his intention to run for re-election he opened eight state offices – one more than he had official offices in the state. Baucus also announced that he had hired 35 full-time campaign staff members. Baucus won re-election in a landslide victory, with 73% of the vote, carrying every county in the state.

== U.S. ambassador to China ==
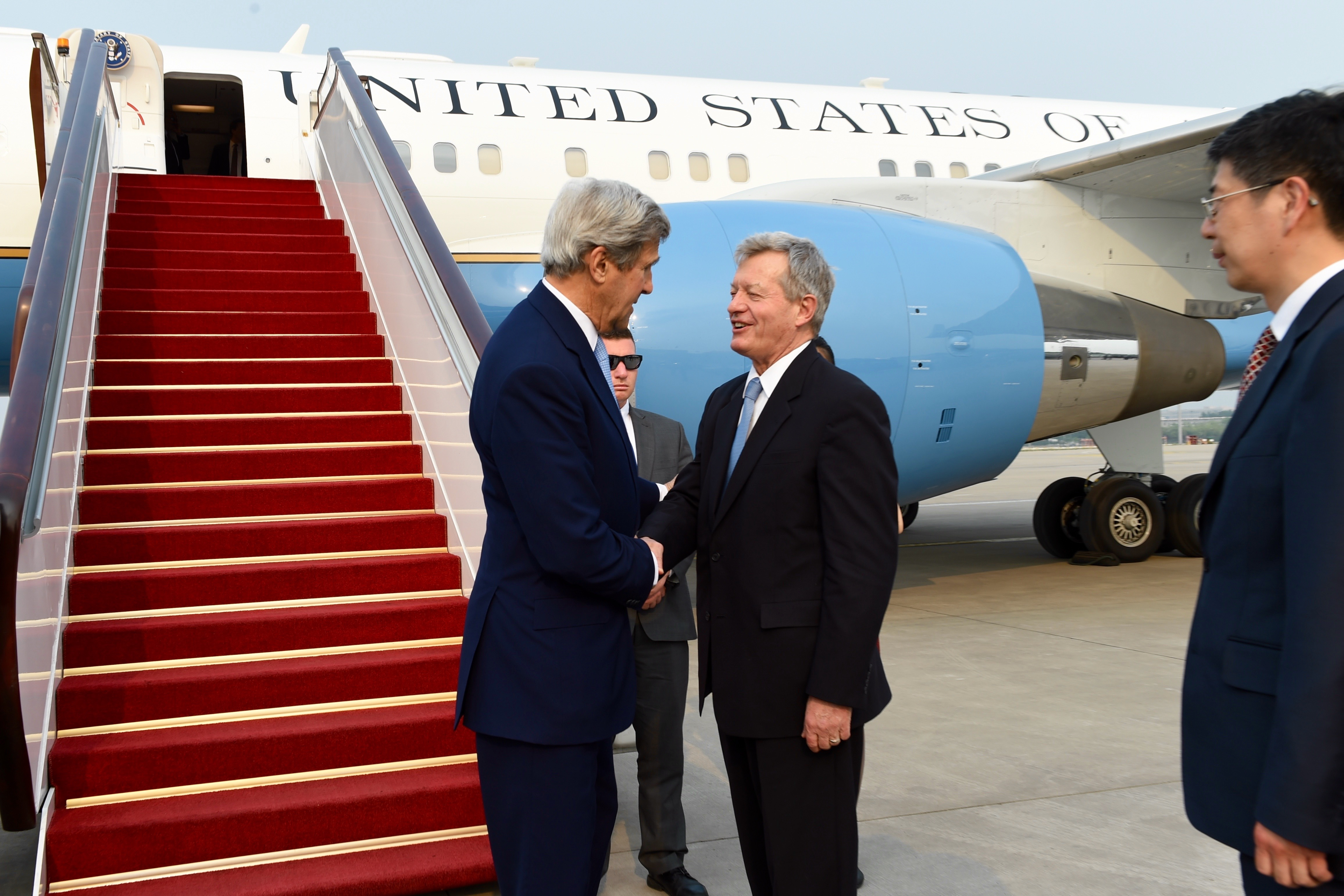
Baucus greeting U.S. Secretary of State John Kerry at Beijing Capital International Airport in June 2016

On December 20, 2013, President Barack Obama announced his intent to nominate Baucus to the post of U.S. ambassador to China. He submitted Baucus's nomination to the Senate on January 7, 2014.

A hearing on the nomination was held by the United States Senate Committee on Foreign Relations on January 28, 2014. His nomination was reported to the full Senate on February 4, 2014. He was confirmed by the full Senate on February 6, 2014 by a vote of 96–0 and Baucus himself voting "Present". Baucus was sworn in by Vice President Joe Biden on February 21, 2014; ending the ambassadorship of Gary Locke. Baucus cannot speak Mandarin Chinese, which was historically unusual for this position.

Baucus ended his ambassadorship in January 2017, as President Donald Trump nominated Iowa Governor Terry Branstad to serve as the next ambassador to China.

== Later career ==
Baucus served on the Board of Advisors to Alibaba Group until May 2019.

== Electoral history ==
1974 U.S. House of Representatives election
Party	Candidate	%
Democratic	Max Baucus	54.7%
Republican	Richard G. Shoup	45.3%
Majority		9.4%
Democratic gain from Republican

1976 U.S. House of Representatives election
Party	Candidate	%
Democratic	Max Baucus	66.4%
Republican	Bill Diehl	33.6%
Majority		32.8%
Democratic hold

1978 U.S. Senate election, Montana
Party	Candidate	%
Democratic	Max Baucus	55.6%
Republican	Larry Williams	44.4%
Majority		11.2%
Democratic hold

1984 U.S. Senate election, Montana
Party	Candidate	%
Democratic	Max Baucus	56.9%
Republican	Chuck Cozzens	40.7%
Majority		16.2%
Democratic hold

1990 U.S. Senate election, Montana
Party	Candidate	%
Democratic	Max Baucus	69.8%
Republican	Allen Kolstad	30.2%
Majority		39.6%
Democratic hold

1996 U.S. Senate election, Montana
Party	Candidate	%
Democratic	Max Baucus	49.5%
Republican	Denny Rehberg	44.7%
Reform	Becky Shaw	4.7%
Natural Law	Stephen Heaton	1%
Majority		4.8%
Democratic hold

2002 U.S. Senate election, Montana
Party	Candidate	%
Democratic	Max Baucus	63%
Republican	Mike Taylor	32%
Green	Bob Kelleher	3%
Majority		31%
Democratic hold

2008 U.S. Senate election, Montana
Party	Candidate	%
Democratic	Max Baucus	73%
Republican	Robert Kelleher	27%
Majority		46%
Democratic hold

== Personal life ==
Baucus has one son by his first wife, Ann Geracimos. Baucus and Geracimos divorced in 1982.

Baucus came under fire from critics calling him a beltway insider who no longer really lived in Montana and only occasionally came to visit. Until 1991, Baucus owned a house in Missoula, where he practiced law for three years before running for Congress in 1974. He didn't own a home again in Montana until February 2002, when he bought half of his mother's house from the ranch started by Baucus's great-grandfather in 1897.

In April 2009, the Associated Press reported that Baucus and his second wife, the former Wanda Minge, were divorcing after 25 years of marriage and had "parted ways amicably and with mutual respect".

On July 2, 2011, Baucus married girlfriend and former office manager Melodee Hanes at the Sieben Ranch in Montana.

Baucus has completed a 50-mile ultramarathon and has crewed for winner and Vermont native Nikki Kimball at the 100-mile Western States Endurance Run, which he hoped to run in the future.

U.S. House of Representatives
Preceded by Richard G. Shoup	Member of the U.S. House of Representatives from Montana's 1st congressional district 1975–1978	Succeeded by John Patrick Williams
Party political offices
Preceded by Lee Metcalf	Democratic nominee for U.S. Senator from Montana (Class 2); 1978, 1984, 1990, 1996, 2002, 2008	Succeeded by John Walsh; Withdrew
Preceded by Les AuCoin, Joe Biden, Bill Bradley, Robert Byrd, Tom Daschle, Bill Hefner, Barbara B. Kennelly, George Miller, Tip O'Neill, Paul Tsongas, Tim Wirth	Response to the State of the Union address 1984; Served alongside: Joe Biden, David L. Boren, Barbara Boxer, Robert Byrd, Dante Fascell, Bill Gray, Tom Harkin, Dee Huddleston, Carl Levin, Tip O'Neill, Claiborne Pell	Succeeded by Bill Clinton; Bob Graham; Tip O'Neill
U.S. Senate
Preceded by Paul G. Hatfield	U.S. Senator (Class 2) from Montana; 1978–2014; Served alongside: John Melcher, Conrad Burns, Jon Tester	Succeeded by John Walsh
Preceded by Daniel Patrick Moynihan	Chair of the Senate Environment Committee; 1993–1995	Succeeded by John Chafee
Preceded by John Chafee	Ranking Member of the Senate Environment Committee; 1995–2001	Succeeded by Bob Smith
Preceded by William Roth	Chair of the Senate Finance Committee; 2001	Succeeded by Chuck Grassley
Preceded by Chuck Grassley	Ranking Member of the Senate Finance Committee; 2001	Succeeded by Chuck Grassley
Preceded by Chuck Grassley	Chair of the Senate Finance Committee; 2001–2003	Succeeded by Chuck Grassley
New office	Chair of the Joint China Commission; 2001–2003	Succeeded by Jim Leach
Preceded by Chuck Grassley	Ranking Member of the Senate Finance Committee; 2003–2007	Succeeded by Chuck Grassley
Preceded by Chuck Grassley	Chair of the Senate Finance Committee; 2007–2014	Succeeded by Ron Wyden
Diplomatic posts
Preceded by Gary Locke	United States Ambassador to China; 2014–2017	Succeeded by Terry Branstad
U.S. order of precedence (ceremonial)
Preceded by Richard Shelby as Former U.S. Senator	Order of precedence of the United States as Former U.S. Senator	Succeeded by Chris Dodd as Former U.S. Senator
