= Hilde Hawlicek =

Austrian politician (born 1942)

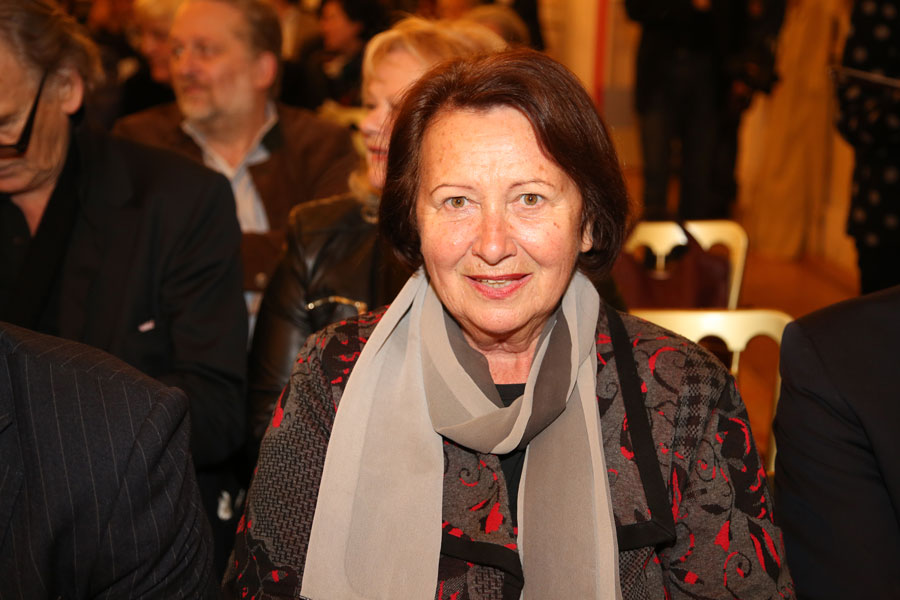
Hawlicek in 2015

Hilde Hawlicek (born 14 April 1942) is an Austrian retired politician and former Minister for Education, Arts and Sport.

== Early life ==
Hawlicek was born and grew up in Vienna. She was a member of the Socialist Youth Austria and Socialist Students of Austria. She studied German and history at the University of Vienna for a teaching degree, which she completed in 1965, followed by political science studies at Vienna's Ford-Institut.

== Career ==
Hawlicek later worked as a schoolteacher until she was appointed to the Federal Council for the Social Democratic Party of Austria (SPÖ) in 1971. In 1976 she left the Federal Council to become a member of the National Council, and in 1979 became part of the Austrian delegation to the Parliamentary Assembly of the Council of Europe. As the first woman in this position, Hawlicek became Minister for Education, Arts and Sport in the second cabinet of Franz Vranitzky in 1987.

During her time in office, Hawlicek worked on reducing gender inequality in the education system by opening up all types of schools to girls. She introduced better sex education and other reforms to the curriculum. She enabled the creation of bilingual schools for Carinthian Slovenes. Hawlicek also defended the play Heldenplatz, which was controversial for its portrayal of nationalism and antisemitism in Austria, against censorship. She left the ministry after the 1990 election and resumed her parliamentary activities.

When Austria joined the European Union in 1995, Hawlicek was one of the 21 appointed Austrian delegates in the European Parliament. In the following 1996 election, she became an elected member of the European Parliament until 1999.

== Awards and honours ==
- Grand Decoration of Honour in Silver for Services to the Republic of Austria (1980)
- Grand Decoration of Honour in Gold with Sash for Services to the Republic of Austria (1990)
- Einspieler Prize (2007)
- Grand Order of Merit of South Tyrol (2010)
- Austrian Cross of Honour for Science and Art, First Class (2012)
