= Jean Baucus =

American historian and rancher (1917–2011)

Jean Baucus (July 7, 1917 – December 10, 2011) was an American historian and rancher. She was also the mother of U.S. Senator Max Baucus of Montana and longtime matriarch of the Baucus family. Her work as a historian focused primarily on the history of Montana and the American West.

== Life and work ==
Baucus was born Jean Sheriff on July 7, 1917, in Helena, Montana, the daughter of Frederick B. and Bernice F. Sheriff. Her paternal grandparents were Court and Mary (Hooper) Sheriff and her maternal grandparents were Henry and Alberta (Gordon) Sieben. In 1896, her maternal grandfather, Henry, purchased a ranch approximately twenty miles north of Helena, which stretches from Missouri River to Little Prickly Pear Creek. The land, which became known as the Sieben Ranch, remains a property of the Baucus family, owned by her son and daughter-in-law, John and Nina Baucus.

Jean Sheriff was raised in both Helena and the Sieben Ranch. She attended Hawthorne School and graduated from Helena High School. She received her bachelor's degree in economics in 1939 from Stanford University. In 1941 she gave birth to Max Sieben Enke, and later, her second child, Karen, with her first husband, Stephen Enke, Ph.D., a demographer and economist. When Max was two years old, Jean Sheriff left California and returned to Montana. Baucus married her second husband, John J. Baucus, in 1946 and had a child with him, John. Her oldest son, Max, took his stepfather's last name and, as Max Baucus, entered politics, eventually becoming a U.S. senator from Montana. She was widowed in 1996.

Baucus authored four nonfiction books focusing on the history of Helena and Montana including "Helena: Her Historic Homes, Vols. 1 and 2", which were released during the late 1970s, and "Gold in the Gulch," published in 1981. Another work, "Helena: An Illustrated History," which she co-authored with editor Vivian Paladin, was first published in 1983 by the Montana Historical Society. Baucus also wrote "Henry Sieben, 1846-1937: Legacy of Livestock and Land", a biography of her grandfather. Her arts patronages included Holter Museum of Art in Helena.

Jean Baucus died at her home in Helena, Montana, on December 10, 2011, at the age of 94.
