= 1996 Palauan constitutional referendum =

A constitutional referendum was held in Palau on 5 November 1996, alongside the general elections. Voters were whether they approved of two changes to the constitution:

1. To allow voters to vote on constitutional amendments at any time, rather than only alongside general elections.
2. To convene a Constitutional Convention to revise the constitution.

Both proposals were rejected by voters, with 53.8% and 51.8% against respectively.

== Results ==
=== Question One ===
| Choice | Votes | % |
|---|---|---|
| For | 4,346 | 46.2 |
| Against | 5,056 | 53.8 |
| Invalid/blank votes | 721 | - |
| Total | 10,123 | 100 |
Source: Nohlen et al.

=== Question Two ===
| Choice | Votes | % |
|---|---|---|
| For | 4,582 | 48.2 |
| Against | 4,929 | 51.8 |
| Invalid/blank votes | 612 | - |
| Total | 10,123 | 100 |
Source: Nohlen et al.
