= Friedhelm Frischenschlager =

Austrian politician (born 1943)

Frischenschlager, Friedhelm
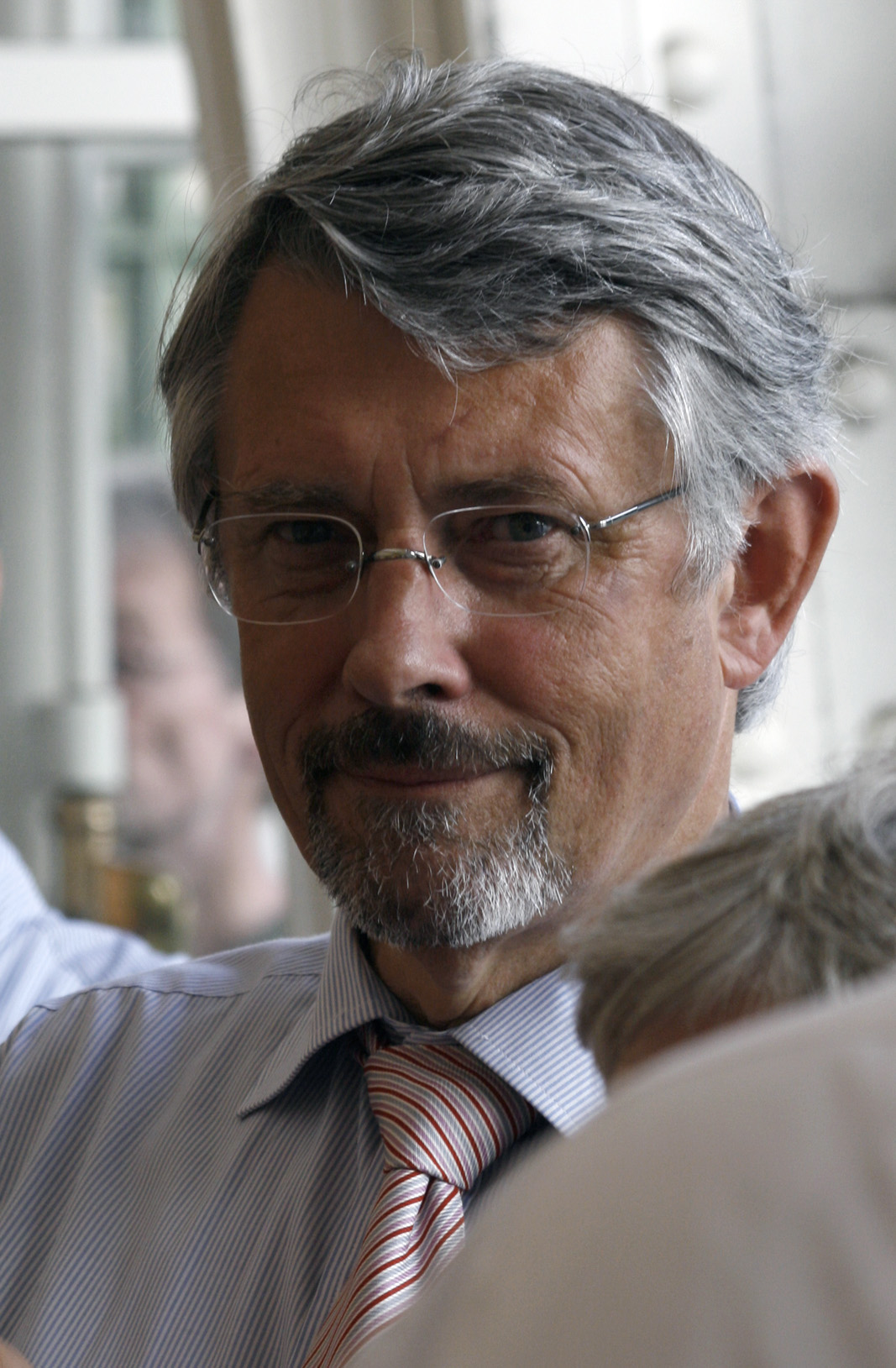

Personal details
- Born: 6 October 1943 (age 82) Salzburg, Austria
- Party: Freedom Party of Austria (1971–1993); Liberal Forum (1993–?)
- Profession: Professor

Friedhelm Frischenschlager (born 6 October 1943 in Salzburg) is an Austrian politician and served in the European Parliament. Originally he was a member of the Freedom Party of Austria before co-founding the Liberal Forum in 1993.

== Career ==
Frischenshlager's political career spanned over 4 decades from the 1970s to 2000s.

His career started as a member of the Liberal Party of Austria and deputy of the National Assembly (since 1977). He served as the Federal Minister for Defense (1983–1986) under the administrations of Fred Sinowatz and Norbert Steger. He also served as the party's Deputy Head / Floor Leaders from 1986–1990.

On 4 February 1993, Frischenschlager was one of the liberal members in the Freedom Party of Austria (FPÖ), including five members of the National Council of Austria, who left the party and founded the Liberal Forum. The five National members who co-founded LIF are Heide Schmidt, Klara Motter, Friedhelm Frischenschlager, Hans Helmut Moser, and Thomas Barmüller.

Frischenshlager also served in the European Parliament (1996–1999), Director of the department of democratization of the OSCE Mission in Kosovo (2001–2003), and Secretary General of the Union of European Federalists, Brussels (UEF) (since 2005).

In 2006, he became Administrative Head of the post graduate Course of Balkan Studies, University of Vienna (post graduate), together with the Institute for the Danube Region and Central Europe (IDM).

== Controversy ==
In 1985, as minister for defence, Frischenschläger officially welcomed former SS-Sturmbannführer Walter Reder, who had returned to Austria after 34 years in prison in Italy. Reder had been extradited to Italy in 1948 to stand trial for war crimes, including ordering the destruction of the town of Marzabotto and other villages near Bologna and for ordering the execution of over 2.000 Italian civilians in Tuscany and Emilia in 1944. He was sentenced to life in prison in 1951, and was paroled in 1985, after which he returned to Austria.
