= 1996 Abkhazian parliamentary election =

- 23 November 1996; 7 December 1996
- All 35 seats in the People's Assembly; 18 seats needed for a majority
- Turnout: 81.3%
Party	Leader	Seats	+/–
Independents / Initiative Groups		35	New
This lists parties that won seats. See the complete results below.

Parliamentary elections were held in Abkhazia on 23 November 1996, with a second round on 7 December. There was also a simultaneous referendum held amongst Abkhazian Refugees.

== Background ==
The election was held to replace the former Abkhaz Autonomous Republic's Supreme Soviet which had split during the Georgian-Abkhazian conflict in 1993 with 28 deputies continuing in Abkhazia as the Abkhaz Supreme Soviet. The remaining 24 formed a parliament in exile in Georgia.

However, international organisations and the most important international political leaders declared that the election would be invalid.

== Electoral system ==
The elections were held using the two-round system; candidates had to receive over 50% of the vote in the first round to be elected, otherwise a second round would be held.

Voters could choose by crossing off all the names on the list of candidates that they didn't want to be the elected, except for the one they preferred.

== Campaign ==
The number of registered candidates contesting the 35 seats was initially reported to be 85, three of whom being Georgian, later there were only 78 with 2 Georgians. All candidates ran as independents.

== Results ==
Of the 35 seats, 30 were filled already in the first round. These 30 MPs elected included 19 Abkhazians, four Russians, three Armenians, two Georgians, one Greek and one Kabardian. Voter turnout was reported to be 81%.

== Referendum ==
In response to the elections, Georgia organised a referendum among refugees from Abkhazia, with polling stations opened in Moscow, St Petersburg, Podolsk and Sochi in Russia, Kyiv in Ukraine, Trabzon in Turkey, Minsk in Belarus, Yerevan in Armenia, as well as in Greece and Israel. The Georgian government stated that over 99% of refugees agreed that the elections were invalid until refugees were allowed to return and its political status as part of Georgia was agreed.
