= 1996 Algerian constitutional referendum =

28 November 1996

Results
Choice	Votes	%
Yes	10,785,919	84.60%
No	1,964,108	15.40%
Valid votes	12,750,027	97.24%
Invalid or blank votes	361,487	2.76%
Total votes	13,111,514	100.00%
Registered voters/turnout	16,434,574	79.78%

A constitutional referendum was held in Algeria on 28 November 1996. Held amidst the Algerian Civil War, the amendments would prohibit the use of Islam and ethnic identity in domestic politics. Despite calls for a boycott, the amendments were approved by 85.8% of voters with a 79.8% turnout. Parliamentary elections were held the following year.

== Results ==
Choice	Votes	%
For	10,945,321	85.8
Against	1,809,793	14.2
Invalid/blank votes	359,363	–
Total	13,114,477	100
Registered voters/turnout	16,434,574	79.8
Source: Nohlen et al.
