= 1996 Lithuanian constitutional referendum =

10 November 1996
- Are you in favor of the law amending Art. 47 of the Constitution of the Republic of Lithuania?
- Outcome: Proposal failed as less than 50% of registered voters voted in favour

Results
Choice	Votes	%
Yes	447,801	52.01%
No	413,188	47.99%
Valid votes	860,989	83.46%
Invalid or blank votes	170,634	16.54%
Total votes	1,031,623	100.00%
Registered voters/turnout	2,596,662	39.73%

A constitutional referendum was held in Lithuania on 10 November 1996 alongside the second round of the parliamentary elections. Voters were asked whether they approved of an amendment to Article 47 of the constitution to add a paragraph allowing EU citizens to buy agricultural land. Although it was approved by 52% of those voting, voter turnout was only 39.7% and the referendum failed to pass the threshold of 50% of registered voters in favour.

== Results ==
Choice	Votes	%
For	447,801	52.01
Against	413,188	47.99
Total	860,989	100.00
Valid votes	860,989	83.46
Invalid/blank votes	170,634	16.54
Total votes	1,031,623	100.00
Registered voters/turnout	2,596,662	39.73
Source: Nohlen & Stöver
