= 1996 Burgenland state election =

The Burgenland state election of 1996 was held in the Austrian state of Burgenland on 2 June 1996.

== Results ==
Party	Votes in %	Seats	Change
Social Democratic Party of Austria (SPÖ)	44.5%	17	+0
Austrian People's Party (ÖVP)	36.1%	14	-1
Freedom Party of Austria (FPÖ)	14.6%	5	+1
The Greens – The Green Alternative (Grüne)	2.5%	0	+0
Liberal Forum (LIF)	1.4%	0	+0
Others	1.1%	0	+0

Popular Vote
SPÖ	44.45%
ÖVP	36.06%
FPÖ	14.55%
GRÜNE	2.49%
LIF	1.39%
Other	1.05%

Landtag seats
SPÖ	47.22%
ÖVP	38.89%
FPÖ	13.89%
