= 1984 United States Senate election in Montana =

- November 6, 1984
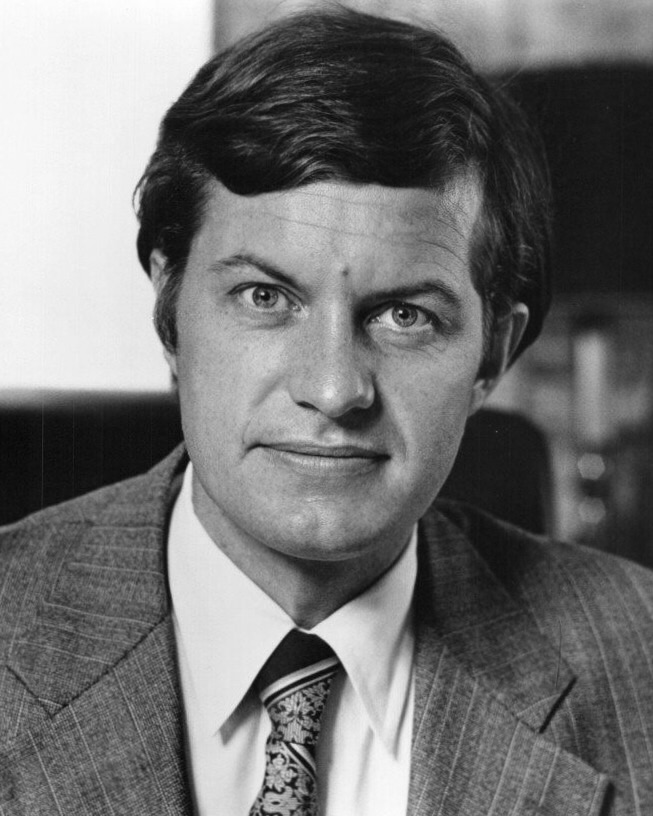

Nominee	Max Baucus	Chuck Cozzens
Party	Democratic	Republican
Popular vote	215,704	154,308
Percentage	56.89%	40.70%
- Baucus: 40–50% 50–60% 60–70% 70–80% Cozzens: 40–50% 50–60%
U.S. senator before election
Max Baucus
Democratic
Elected U.S. Senator
Max Baucus
Democratic

The 1984 United States Senate election in Montana took place on November 6, 1984. Incumbent United States Senator Max Baucus, who was first elected in 1978, ran for re-election. He easily won renomination in the Democratic primary, and advanced to the general election, where he faced Chuck Cozzens, a former State Representative and the Republican nominee. Despite President Ronald Reagan's strong performance in the state that year, Baucus was able to easily win a second term over Cozzens.

== Democratic primary ==
=== Candidates ===
- Max Baucus, incumbent Senator
- Bob Ripley

=== Results ===
Democratic Party primary results
Party	Candidate	Votes	%
Democratic	Max Baucus (incumbent)	80,726	79.37%
Democratic	Bob Ripley	20,979	20.63%
Total votes		101,705	100.00%

== Republican primary ==
=== Candidates ===
- Chuck Cozzens, former State Representative
- Ralph Bouma, retired farmer
- Aubyn Curtiss, State Representative

=== Results ===
Republican Primary results
Party	Candidate	Votes	%
Republican	Chuck Cozzens	33,661	50.78%
Republican	Ralph Bouma	17,900	27.00%
Republican	Aubyn Curtiss	14,729	22.22%
Total votes		66,290	100.00%

== General election ==
=== Results ===
United States Senate election in Montana, 1984
Party	Candidate	Votes	%	±%
Democratic	Max Baucus (incumbent)	215,704	56.89%	+1.20%
Republican	Chuck Cozzens	154,308	40.70%	−3.61%
Libertarian	Neil Haprin	9,143	2.41%	
Majority		61,396	16.19%	+4.81%
Turnout		379,155		
Democratic hold		Swing		

==== By congressional district ====
Baucus won both congressional districts, including one that elected a Republican.

District	Baucus	Cozzens	Representative
1st	57%	40%	Pat Williams
2nd	56%	41%	Ron Marlenee

== See also ==
- 1984 United States Senate elections
