= 1996 Arkansas lieutenant gubernatorial special election =

- November 5, 1996
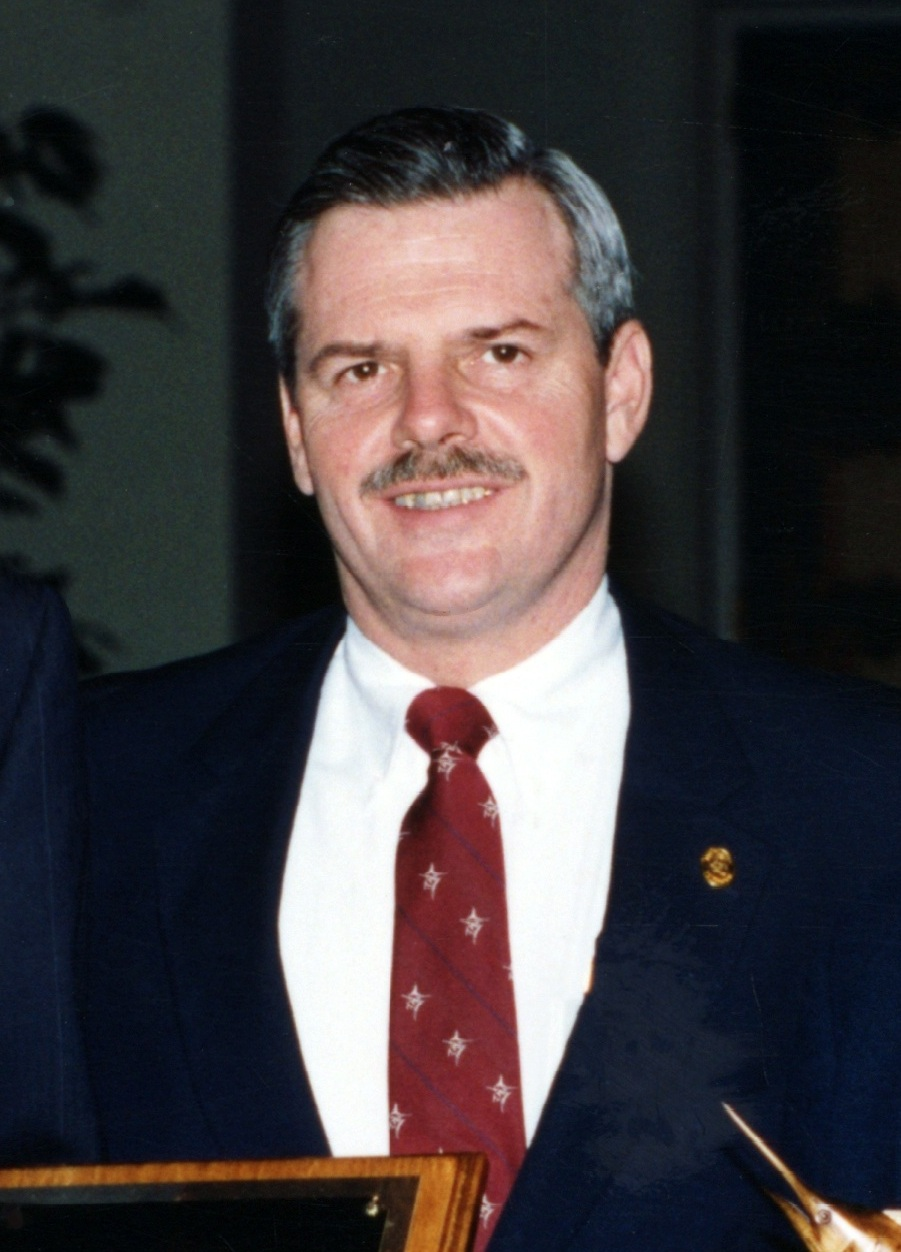

Nominee	Winthrop Paul Rockefeller	Charlie Cole Chaffin
Party	Republican	Democratic
Popular vote	438,716	428,337
Percentage	50.60%	49.40%
Lieutenant Governor before election
Vacant
Elected Lieutenant Governor
Winthrop Paul Rockefeller
Republican

The 1996 Arkansas lieutenant gubernatorial special election was held on November 5, 1996 to fill the office of lieutenant governor of Arkansas, which became vacant following Mike Huckabee's ascension to the governorship after Jim Guy Tucker resigned. Republican nominee and businessman Winthrop Paul Rockefeller narrowly won the election, defeating Democratic former Arkansas state senator and 1994 Democratic nominee for lieutenant governor Charlie Cole Chaffin by one percentage point.

== General election ==
=== Candidates ===
- Winthrop Paul Rockefeller, businessman and farmer (Republican)
- Charlie Cole Chaffin, former Arkansas state senator (1984–1994) and 1994 Democratic nominee for Arkansas lieutenant governor (Democratic)

=== Results ===
1996 Arkansas lieutenant gubernatorial special election results
Party	Candidate	Votes	%	±%
Republican	Winthrop Paul Rockefeller	438,716	50.60%	−7.98%
Democratic	Charlie Cole Chaffin	428,337	49.40%	+7.98%
Total votes		867,053	100.00%	
Republican hold				
