= 1996 European Parliament election in Austria =

13 October 1996	1999 →

21 seats to the European Parliament
- Turnout: 67.73%
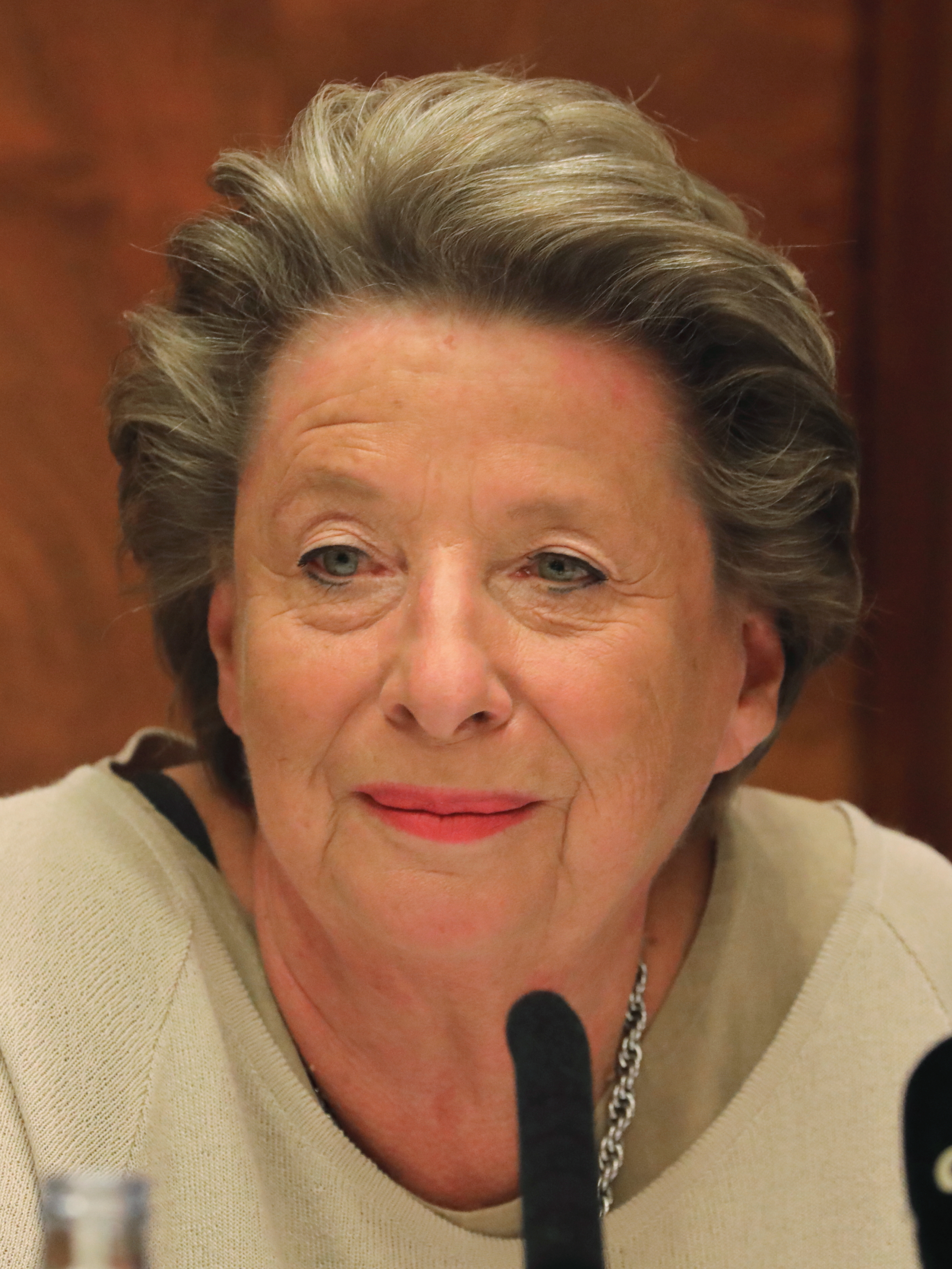

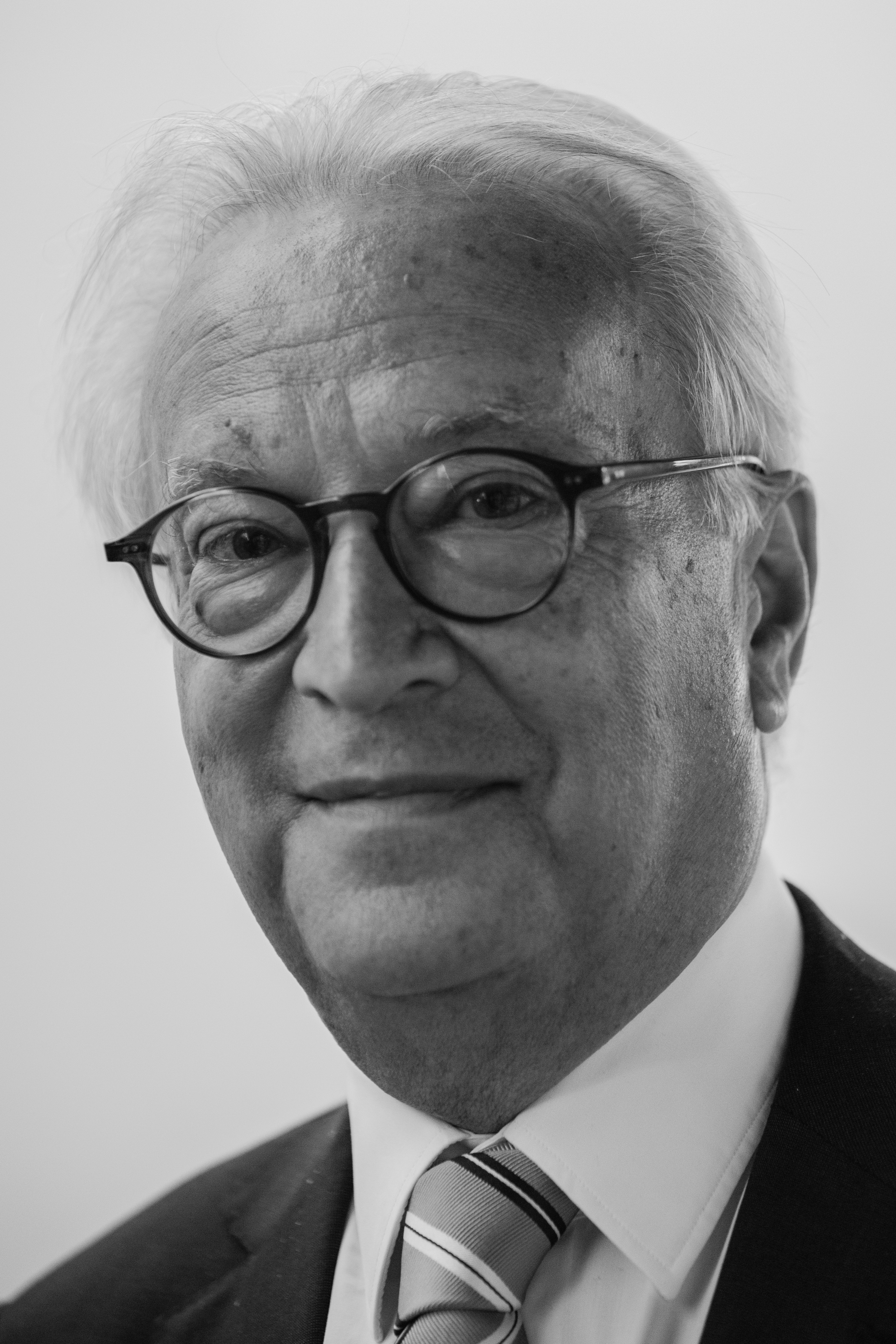

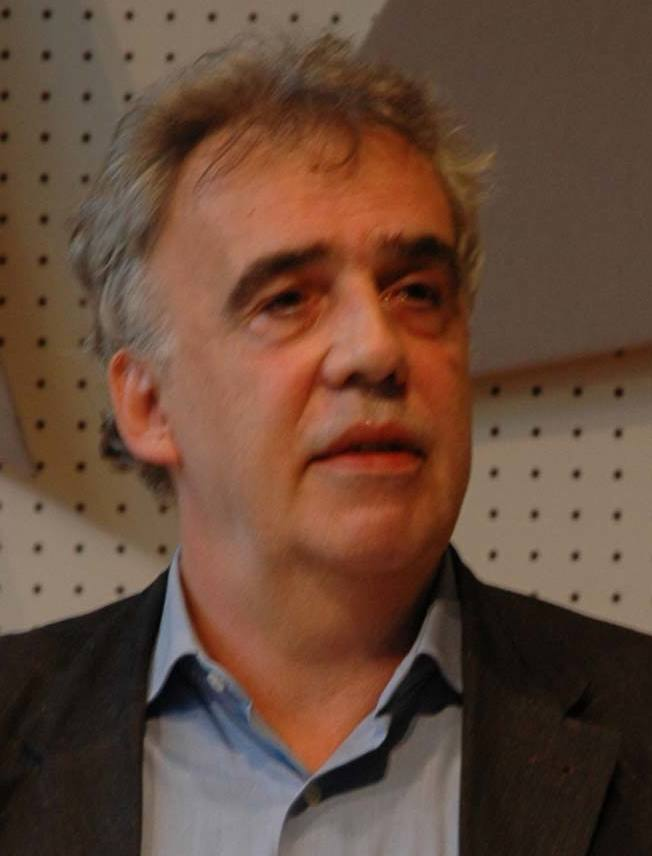

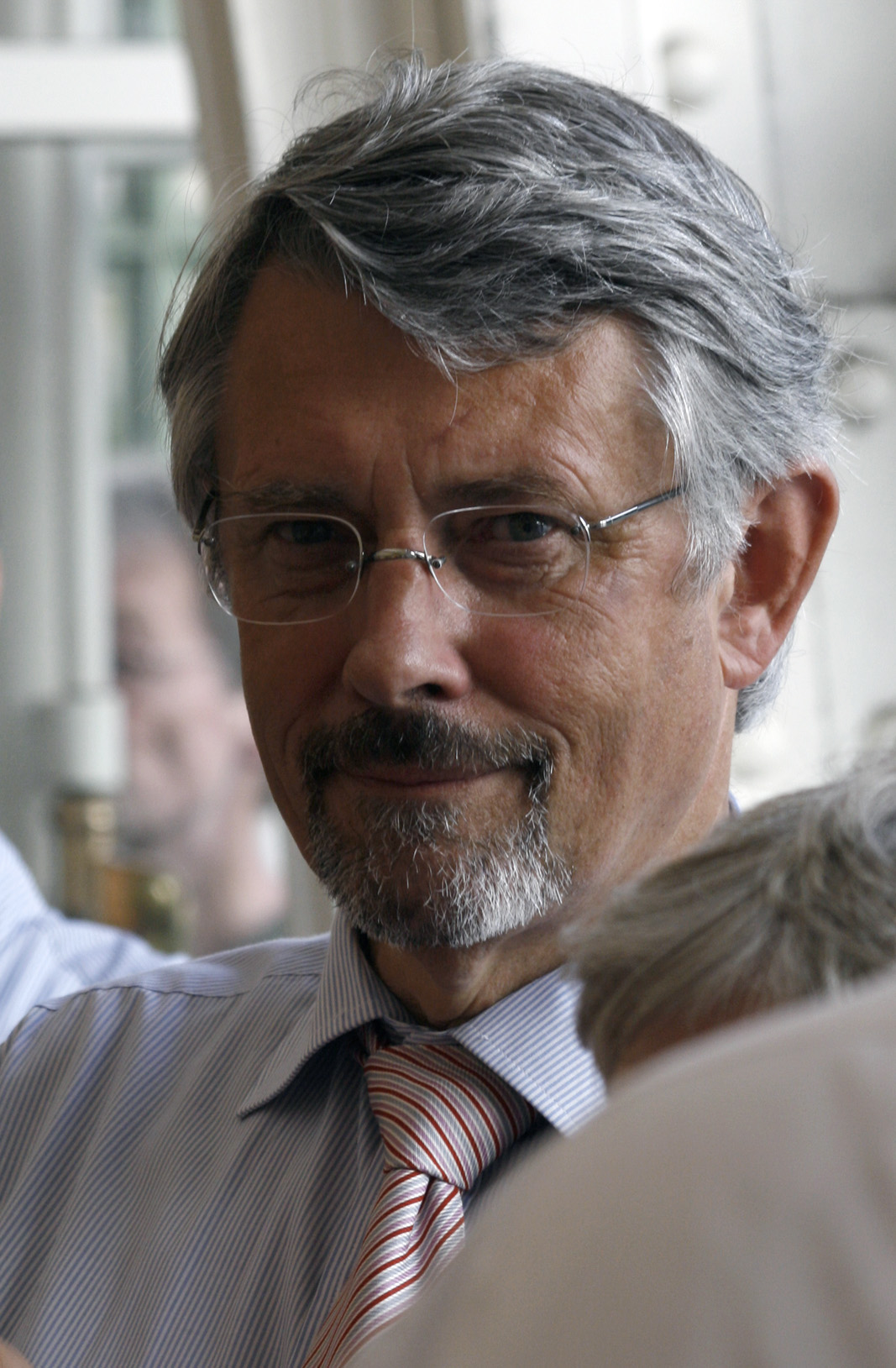
	First party	Second party	Third party
Leader	Ursula Stenzel	Hannes Swoboda	Franz Linser
Party	ÖVP	SPÖ	FPÖ
Alliance	EPP	PES	NI
Seats won	7	6	6
Popular vote	1,124,921	1,105,910	1,044,604
Percentage	29.65%	29.15%	27.53%
	Fourth party	Fifth party
Leader	Johannes Voggenhuber	Friedhelm Frischenschlager
Party	Greens	LiF
Alliance	European Greens	ALDE
Seats won	1	1
Popular vote	258,250	161,583
Percentage	6.81%	4.26%
- Results by state

European elections were held in Austria on 13 October 1996 to elect the 21 Austrian members of the European Parliament.

== Background ==
In 1996, Austria was a country with a population of 7.9 million (5.8 million voters). The federal government was a "grand coalition" of the Social Democratic Party (SPÖ) and the Christian Democratic Party (ÖVP) and was led by Chancellor Franz Vranitzky.

At the last national election in 1995, the parties obtained the following results: SPÖ: 38.1%, ÖVP: 28.3%, FPÖ: 21.9%, Liberals: 5.5% and Greens: 4.8%.

== Composition before election ==
- PES Group (8): Albrecht Karl KONECNY, Elisabeth HLAVAC, Erhard MEIER, Erich FARTHOFER, Herbert BÖSCH, Hilde HAWLICEK*, Ilona GRAENITZ, Irene CREPAZ.
- EPP Group (6): Agnes SCHIERHUBER, Friedrich KÖNIG, Michael SPINDELEGGER, Milan LINZER, Paul RÜBIG, Reinhard RACK*.
- NI (FPÖ) (5): Erich SCHREINER, Franz LINSER*, Klaus LUKAS, Wolfgang JUNG, Wolfgang NUßBAUMER.
- ELDR Group (1): Martina GREDLER*
- Green Group (1): Johannes VOGGENHUBER*.

An asterisk (*) indicates Members standing for re-election.

== Electoral system ==
The electoral system used for the European elections was based on proportional representation, comparable to the system traditionally used in Austria for legislative elections.

The parties put forward lists of candidates. The seats are shared out on the basis of the percentage of the votes obtained by each list. Because of the limited number of seats, the lists were identical for the whole of Austria; there were no regional lists. The threshold required to win a seat was 4%. Candidates who win 7% of the total 'preference votes' obtained by their party would win one of the seats accorded to the party, irrespective of their position on the list. The lists of candidates had to be signed by three members of the national parliament, or by one Member of the European Parliament, or by 2600 voters. The minimum voting age was 18. European citizens residing in Austria were entitled to vote provided that they did not vote in their country of origin in the June 1994 European elections. 7205 European citizens registered and fulfilled that condition.

== Parties running for election ==
The following political parties entered lists for the European elections on 13 October 1996:

=== Parties represented in the EP ===
- SPÖ (social democrats): chief candidate Mr Hannes SWOBODA.
- ÖVP (Christian democrats): chief candidate Mrs Ursula STENZEL.
- FPÖ (non-attached): chief candidate Mr Franz LINSER*.
- Liberales Forum (liberals): chief candidate Mr Friedhelm FRISCHENSCHLAGER.
- Die Grünen (greens): chief candidate Mr Johannes VOGGENHUBER*.

=== Parties not represented in the EP ===
- Forum Handicap (group defending the interests of the handicapped): Mr Klaus VOGET.
- KPÖ (communists): Mr Walter BAIER.
- N-Die Neutralen (group campaigning for the retention of neutrality)

== Results ==
Party or alliance		Votes	%	Seats
EPP	Austrian People's Party	1,124,921	29.65	7
S&D	Social Democratic Party of Austria	1,105,910	29.15	6
NI	Freedom Party of Austria	1,044,604	27.53	6
G	The Greens – The Green Alternative	258,250	6.81	1
ELDR	Liberal Forum	161,583	4.26	1
NI	The Neutrals	48,600	1.28	0
NI	Forum Handicap	32,621	0.86	0
GUE-NGL	Communist Party of Austria	17,656	0.47	0
Total		3,794,145	100.00	21
Valid votes		3,794,145	96.58	
Invalid/blank votes		134,393	3.42	
Total votes		3,928,538	100.00	
Registered voters/turnout		5,800,377	67.73	
Source: Ministry of Interior

=== Results by state ===
The three best parties' results by state

The ÖVP won a plurality of nationwide votes, winning five federal states out of nine. The SPÖ and the FPÖ each won two states; in particular, the SPÖ prevailed in the capital city-state of Vienna. The ÖVP recorded their best results in Vorarlberg, the country's westernmost and second-smallest state. Simultaneously, the SPÖ performed the worst there, at just 13.7%. Neither party reached at least 40% in any state: the SPÖ's 38.1% in Burgenland was the best performance for any party in any state.

State	SPÖ	ÖVP	FPÖ	GRÜNE	LiF	The Neutrals	Forum Handicap	KPÖ
Burgenland	38.1	33.1	21.8	3.0	2.5	0.6	0.6	0.2
Carinthia	34.4	19.6	37.2	3.9	2.6	0.8	1.3	0.3
Lower Austria	29.3	35.7	23.1	5.3	4.2	1.3	0.7	0.5
Upper Austria	28.5	30.9	28.1	6.5	3.5	1.5	0.7	0.4
Salzburg	24.8	29.7	31.3	7.6	4.4	1.1	0.8	0.3
Styria	29.2	30.4	28.9	5.8	3.2	1.1	1.0	0.6
Tyrol	17.0	33.7	33.7	8.6	4.6	1.2	0.9	0.4
Vorarlberg	13.9	36.2	33.1	9.0	4.9	2.2	0.7	0.2
Vienna	34.0	21.9	24.2	10.1	6.6	1.5	1.0	0.7
Austria	29.2	29.7	27.6	6.8	4.3	1.3	0.9	0.5
Source: Austrian Interior Ministry
