= 1996 Miami mayoral special election =

Election in Florida, US

- July 23, 1996
- Turnout: 19%

Candidate	Joe Carollo	Eladio Armesto	C.C. Reed
Popular vote	16,556	2,297	1,202
Percentage	75.76%	10.51%	5.50%
Mayor before election
Willy Gort (acting)
Elected mayor
Joe Carollo

The 1996 Miami mayoral special election was a special election held on July, 23, 1996, following the death of Mayor Stephen P. Clark that June. City Commissioner (city councilor) Joe Carollo was elected to fill the remainder of Clark's unexpired term as mayor, facing no significant opponents.

== Background ==
The special election took place due to the death in office of Mayor Stephen P. Clark, who died of cancer on June 4, 1996.

With Miami having a council-manager form of government, the mayoralty was largely seen as a primarily ceremonial office. Most executive power in the city and its metro area was instead held by the city manager of Miami and the mayor of Dade County (county executive).

== Candidates ==
=== Ran ===
- Olga Andreu-Moreira
- Eladio Jose Armesto, editor of a community newspaper
- Rolando Barreiro Jr.
- Joe Carollo, city commissioner
- C.C. Reed

=== Withdrew ===
- Roger Snell –name remained on ballot

== Campaigning ==
By early 1996, it had been widely known that Mayor Clark was dying of cancer. Rumors emerged that City Commissioner Joe Carollo, who was undertaking many public appearances across the city resembling those of a candidate for mayor, was already gearing up to run in the instance of a special election to fill his seat. Carollo, however, refused to validate these rumors, and argued that these public appearances were "just grass-roots work that any good official should do. Carollo announced his candidacy for mayor several days after Clark's funeral.

Carollo had a history of fielding ugly attacks against opponents for office, which may have dissuaded other city politicians from entering the race against him. Ultimately, he faced no serious challenger. None of his opponents had ever held elected office, and more than one was currently unemployed. His most significant opponent was Eladio Jose Amresto, a publisher of weekly newspapers. However, Armesto's political baggage included previously having faced charges of domestic abuse for beating his wife with a wooden coathanger (charges which were dropped after he agreed to 200 hours of community service), and he was not considered to have an actual prospect of winning the election.

== Results ==
The election saw turnout of only 19% of the more than 110,000 registered voters that were eligible to participate.

Carollo was easily elected, leading in every electoral precinct. He became the city's second mayor of Cuban descent (the first having been Xavier Suarez).

Results
Candidate	Votes	%
Joe Carollo	16,556	75.75
Eladio Jose Armesto	2,297	10.51
C.C. Reed	1,202	5.50
Roger Snell withdrew	588	2.69
Rolando Barreiro Jr.	460	2.10
Jacqueline Maria Chediak	409	1.87
Olga Andreu-Moriera	344	1.57
Total votes	21,856	100
