= 1978 United States Senate election in Montana =

- November 7, 1978
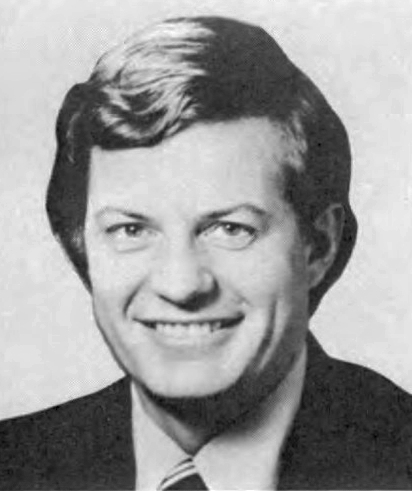

Nominee	Max Baucus	Larry R. Williams
Party	Democratic	Republican
Popular vote	160,353	127,589
Percentage	55.69%	44.31%
- County results Baucus: 50–60% 60–70% 70–80% Williams: 50–60% 60–70%
U.S. senator before election
Paul G. Hatfield
Democratic
Elected U.S. Senator
Max Baucus
Democratic

The 1978 United States Senate election in Montana took place on November 7, 1978. Following the death of United States Senator Lee Metcalf on January 12, 1978, Montana Supreme Court Chief Justice Paul G. Hatfield was appointed to serve for the remainder of Metcalf's term. Hatfield opted to run for a full term, but was overwhelmingly defeated in the Democratic primary by U.S. Representative Max Baucus of the 1st congressional district. Baucus advanced to the general election, where he was opposed by the Republican nominee, author Larry R. Williams. Baucus ended up defeating Williams by a solid margin to win his first term in the Senate, and, following Hatfield's resignation on December 12, 1978, he began serving his first term in the Senate.

Despite the death of Metcalf, this was not a special election, as one for the year 1978 was already planned as a normal Senate election.

== Democratic primary ==
=== Candidates ===
- Max Baucus, U.S. Representative from Montana's 1st congressional district
- Paul G. Hatfield, incumbent U.S. Senator
- John Driscoll, former Speaker of the Montana House of Representatives
- Steve Shugrue

=== Results ===
Democratic Party primary results
Party	Candidate	Votes	%
Democratic	Max Baucus	87,085	65.25%
Democratic	Paul G. Hatfield (incumbent)	25,789	19.32%
Democratic	John Driscoll	18,184	13.62%
Democratic	Steve Shugrue	2,404	1.80%
Total votes		133,462	100.00%

== Republican primary ==
=== Candidates ===
- Larry R. Williams, author
- Bill Osborne
- Clancy Rich

=== Results ===
Republican Primary results
Party	Candidate	Votes	%
Republican	Larry R. Williams	35,479	61.66%
Republican	Bill Osborne	16,436	28.57%
Republican	Clancy Rich	5,622	9.77%
Total votes		57,537	100.00%

== General election ==
=== Results ===
United States Senate election in Montana, 1978
Party	Candidate	Votes	%	±%
Democratic	Max Baucus	160,353	55.69%	+3.74%
Republican	Larry R. Williams	127,589	44.31%	−3.74%
Majority		32,764	11.38%	+7.48%
Turnout		287,942		
Democratic hold		Swing		

== See also ==
- 1978 United States Senate elections
