= List of members of the European Parliament for the Czech Republic, 2009–2014 =

Members of the European Parliament for the Czech Republic
Observers	(2003)
Delegation	(2004)
6th term	(2004)
7th term	(2009)
8th term	(2014)
9th term	(2019)
10th term	(2024)

This is a list of the 22 members of the European Parliament for the Czech Republic in the 2009 to 2014 session.

== List ==
Name	National party	EP Group	Votes
Jan Březina	Christian and Democratic Union	EPP	23,154
Zuzana Brzobohatá	Social Democratic Party	S&D	7,736
Milan Cabrnoch	Civic Democratic Party	ECR	7,143
Andrea Češková	Civic Democratic Party	ECR	14,477
Robert Dušek	Social Democratic Party	S&D	4,042
Hynek Fajmon	Civic Democratic Party	ECR	16,041
Richard Falbr	Social Democratic Party	S&D	44,703
Jiří Havel	Social Democratic Party	S&D	59,818
Jaromír Kohlíček	Communist Party (Bohemia and Moravia)	EUL–NGL	5,719
Edvard Kožušník	Civic Democratic Party	ECR	11,567
Jiří Maštálka	Communist Party (Bohemia and Moravia)	EUL–NGL	8,181
Miroslav Ouzký	Civic Democratic Party	ECR	9,869
Pavel Poc	Social Democratic Party	S&D	4,814
Miloslav Ransdorf	Communist Party (Bohemia and Moravia)	EUL–NGL	61,453
Vladimír Remek	Communist Party (Bohemia and Moravia)	EUL–NGL	40,650
Zuzana Roithová	Christian and Democratic Union	EPP	52,503
Libor Rouček	Social Democratic Party	S&D	19,771
Olga Sehnalová	Social Democratic Party	S&D	9,386
Ivo Strejček	Civic Democratic Party	ECR	6,071
Evžen Tošenovský	Civic Democratic Party	ECR	104,737
Oldřich Vlasák	Civic Democratic Party	ECR	11,744
Jan Zahradil	Civic Democratic Party	ECR	65,731

=== Party representation ===
National party	EP Group	Seats	±
Civic Democratic Party	ECR	9 / 22	Steady
Social Democratic Party	S&D	7 / 22	▲5
Communist Party (Bohemia and Moravia)	EUL–NGL	4 / 22	▼2
Christian and Democratic Union	EPP	2 / 22	Steady
