= List of members of the European Parliament for the Czech Republic, 2004–2009 =

Members of the European Parliament for the Czech Republic
| Observers | (2003) |
| Delegation | (2004) |
| 6th term | (2004) |
| 7th term | (2009) |
| 8th term | (2014) |
| 9th term | (2019) |
| 10th term | (2024) |

This is a list of the 24 members of the European Parliament for the Czech Republic in the 2004 to 2009 session.

== List ==
| Name | National party | EP Group | Votes |
|---|---|---|---|
| Jana Bobošíková | Independent Democrats | NI | 99,368 |
| Jan Březina | Christian and Democratic Union | EPP–ED | 27,854 |
| Milan Cabrnoch | Civic Democratic Party | EPP–ED | 5,719 |
| Petr Duchoň | Civic Democratic Party | EPP–ED | 31,175 |
| Hynek Fajmon | Civic Democratic Party | EPP–ED | 4,840 |
| Richard Falbr | Social Democratic Party | PES | 47,270 |
| Věra Flasarová | Communist Party (Bohemia and Moravia) | EUL–NGL | 8,711 |
| Jana Hybášková | SNK European Democrats | EPP–ED | 59,282 |
| Jaromír Kohlíček | Communist Party (Bohemia and Moravia) | EUL–NGL | 9,338 |
| Jiří Maštálka | Communist Party (Bohemia and Moravia) | EUL–NGL | 13,317 |
| Miroslav Ouzký | Civic Democratic Party | EPP–ED | 5,771 |
| Miloslav Ransdorf | Communist Party (Bohemia and Moravia) | EUL–NGL | 142,444 |
| Vladimír Remek | Communist Party (Bohemia and Moravia) | EUL–NGL | 85,272 |
| Zuzana Roithová | Christian and Democratic Union | EPP–ED | 52,166 |
| Libor Rouček | Social Democratic Party | PES | 39,885 |
| Nina Škottová | Civic Democratic Party | EPP–ED | 9,352 |
| Ivo Strejček | Civic Democratic Party | EPP–ED | 5,865 |
| Daniel Stroz | Communist Party (Bohemia and Moravia) | EUL–NGL | 1,808 |
| Oldřich Vlasák | Civic Democratic Party | EPP–ED | 10,801 |
| Jan Zahradil | Civic Democratic Party | EPP–ED | 129,888 |
| Tomáš Zatloukal | SNK European Democrats | EPP–ED | 4,110 |
| Vladimír Železný | Independent Democrats | IND&DEM | 62,638 |
| Jozef Zieleniec | SNK European Democrats | EPP–ED | 83,828 |
| Jaroslav Zvěřina | Civic Democratic Party | EPP–ED | 54,957 |

=== Party representation ===
| National party | EP Group | Seats | ± |
|---|---|---|---|
| Civic Democratic Party | EPP–ED | 9 / 24 | |
| Communist Party (Bohemia and Moravia) | EUL–NGL | 6 / 24 | |
| SNK European Democrats | EPP–ED | 3 / 24 | |
| Christian and Democratic Union | EPP–ED | 2 / 24 | |
| Social Democratic Party | PES | 2 / 24 | |
| Independent Democrats | NI | 2 / 24 | |
