= 2009 European Parliament election in the Czech Republic =

- 5–6 June 2009

22 seats in the European Parliament
- Turnout: 28.22%
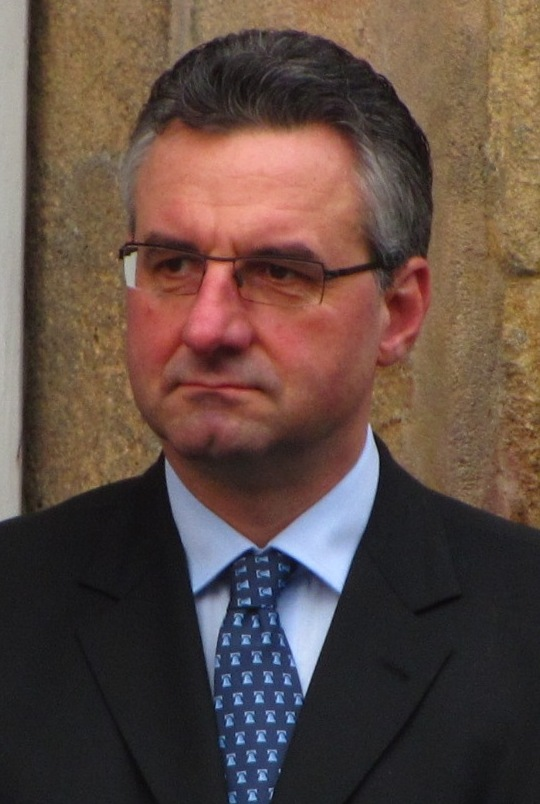

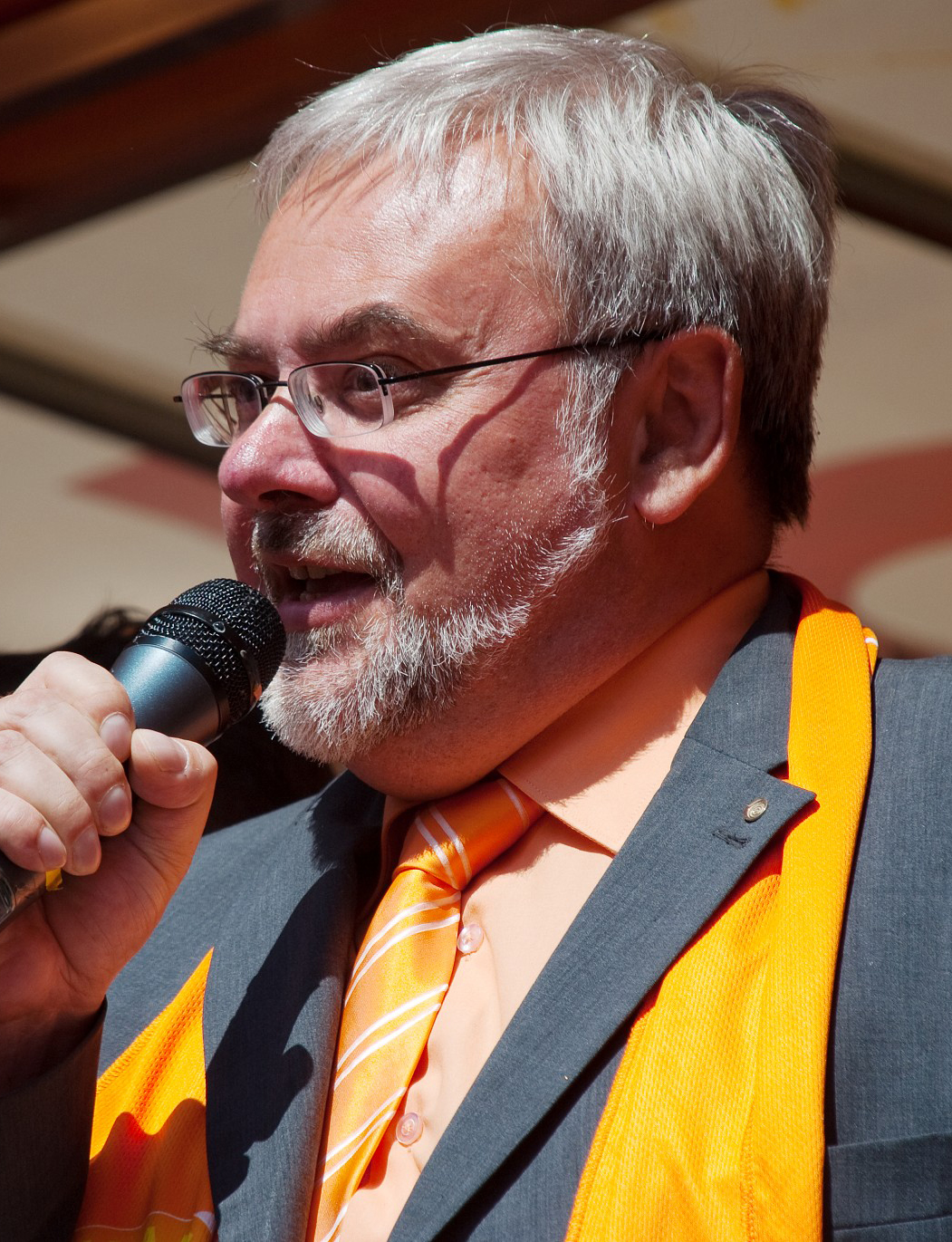

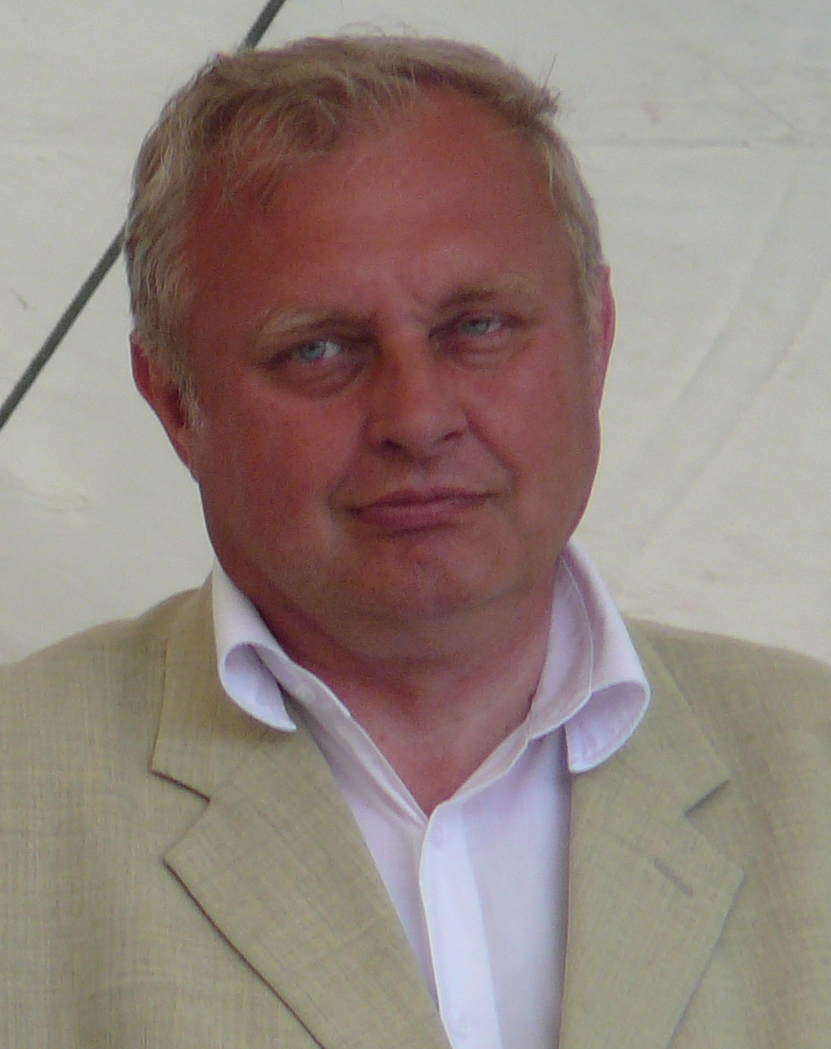

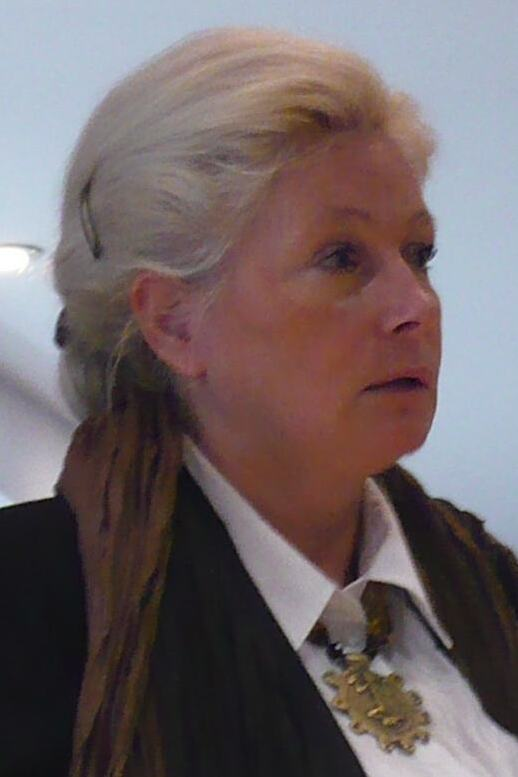
	First party	Second party
Leader	Jan Zahradil	Jiří Havel
Party	ODS	ČSSD
Alliance	AECR	PES
Seats won	9	7
Seat change	Steady	▲5
Popular vote	741,946	528,132
Percentage	31.45%	22.39%
Swing	▲1.40pp	▲13.61pp
	Third party	Fourth party
Leader	Miloslav Ransdorf	Zuzana Roithová
Party	KSČM	KDU-ČSL
Alliance	GUE/NGL	EPP
Seats won	4	2
Seat change	▼2	Steady
Popular vote	334,577	180,451
Percentage	14.18%	7.65%
Swing	▼6.09pp	▼1.93pp

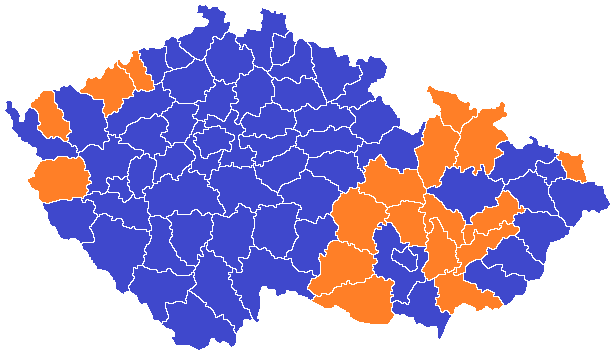
Result by district (ODS Blue, ČSSD orange)

The 2009 European Parliament election in Czech Republic was the election of the delegation from Czech Republic to the European Parliament in 2009. The Civic Democratic Party has won the election with a surprisingly strong lead against the Czech Social Democratic Party. Communist Party of Bohemia and Moravia came third and the Christian and Democratic Union – Czechoslovak People's Party became the last party to enter the Parliament.

Two newly founded right-wing parties, the Czech wing Libertas.cz of Declan Ganley's Libertas founded by Vladimír Železný and the Party of Free Citizens, ran in the election.

== Background ==
Previous election was held in 2004. It was won by the Civic Democratic Party that won 30% of votes ahead of the Communist Party of Bohemia and Moravia which received 20% of the votes. Czech Social Democratic Party of Prime Minister Vladimír Špidla was heavily defeated receiving only 9% of votes finishing fourth. Špidle resigned after the election.

Civic Democrats joined European People's Party group after the election as a member of European Democrats. ODS the cooperated with British Conservative Party to establish new Eurosceptic faction within European Parliament.

=== 2004 Seats ===
Party	EP Group	Seats
ODS	EPP-ED	9
KSČM	GUE-NGL	6
SNK ED	EPP-ED	3
ČSSD	S&D	2
KDU-ČSL	EPP-ED	2
NEZÁVISLÍ	IND/DEM	2

=== Procedure ===
The 22 of Czech delegation in the European parliament are elected using open list proportional representation, in which they can give preferential votes for up to two candidates on their chosen list. Seats are allocated using the d'Hondt method, with an electoral threshold of 5% nationwide for single parties. Candidates who receive preferential votes from more than 5% of voters are moved to the top of their list, and in cases where more than one candidate receives over 5% of the preferential votes, they are ranked in order of votes received.

== Campaign ==
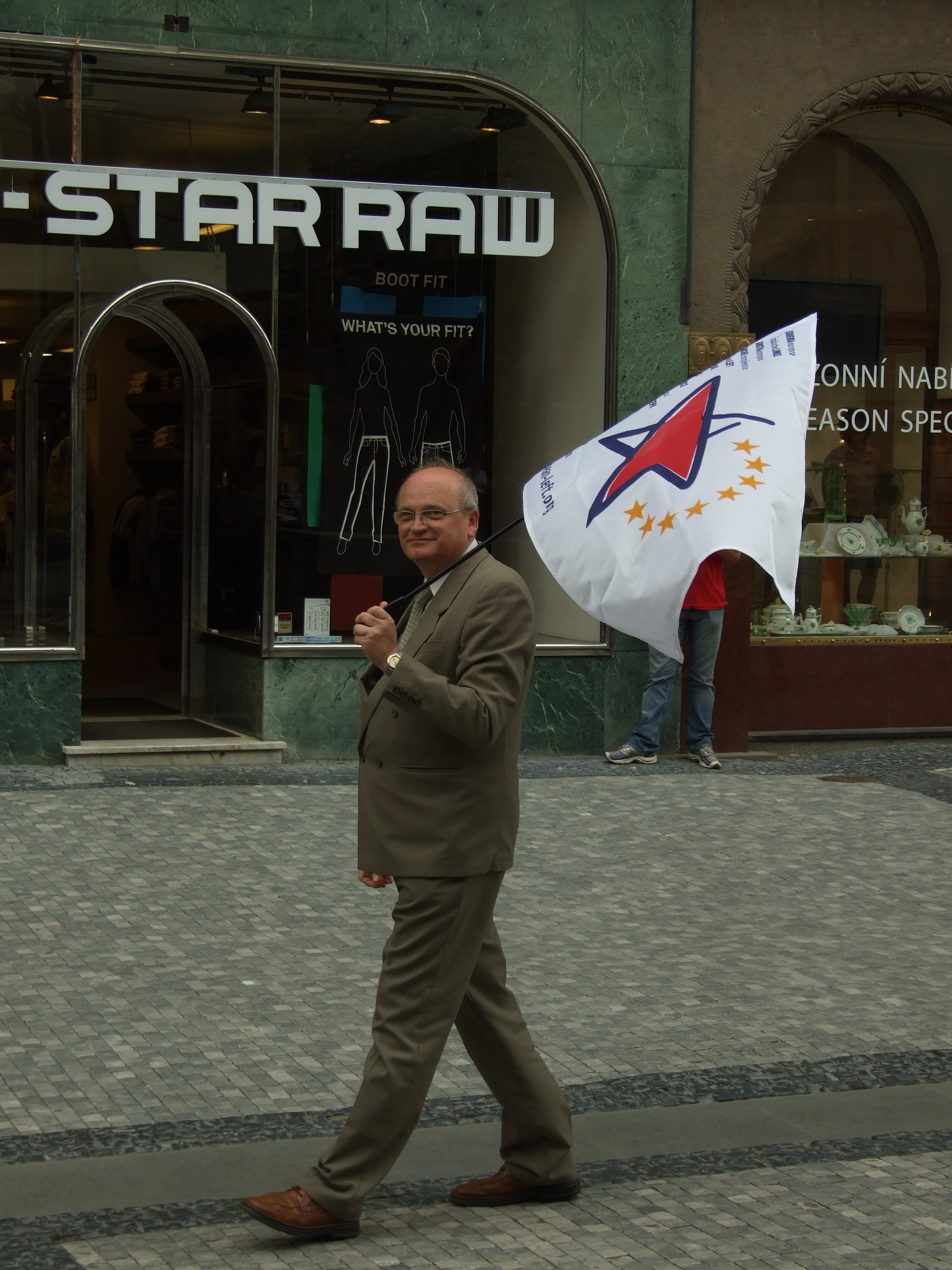
Politician rallyes in the central part of Prague few days before elections of European Parliament for 2009–2013 term

=== Civic Democratic Party ===
First candidates were introduced on 9 February 2009. Jan Zahradil became electoral leader. Other candidates included Evžen Tošenovský, Oldřich Vlasák etg. Party also launched its election website on the same day. Zahradil stated that ODS will be forced to use negative campaign as reaction to strateg of its opponents. Remaining candidates were introduced on 16 March 2009.

Campaign of Civic Democratic Party (ODS) was launched by electoral leader Jan Zahradil on 13 February 2009. ODS stated that it would invest 40 million CZK to the campaign.

ODS started negative campaign against ČSSD as response to Social Democratic campaigns from previous years. Civic Democrats founded Blue Team to help the party with campaign.

The Civic Democratic Party was active on internet and used social media during its campaign while its main rival and election front-runner Social Democratic Party underestimated internet campaign and Civic Democrats got to lead as a result.

=== Czech Social Democratic Party ===
ČSSD planned to invest 30 million CZK. Czech Social Democratic Party was led by Jiří Havel. Party decided to focus on Financial crisis and domestic issues during its campaign. Social Democratic Party was considered front-runner as it was leading in polls but the lead narrowed as the election date was getting closer. The Civic Democratic Party was active on internet and used social media during its campaign and eventually. Social Democrats on the other hand underestimated internet campaign and Civic Democrats got to lead as a result.

=== Communist Party of Bohemia and Moravia ===
Miloslav Ransdorf was announced as electoral leader on 18 September 2008.

=== Christian and Democratic Union – People's Party ===
Christian Democrats launched election campaign on 9 March 2009. They introduced their candidates on 20 March 2009.

=== Green Party ===
Greens voted Jan Dusík as its electoral leader on 28 February 2009.

=== EP list leaders ===
- ODS – Jan Zahradil
- ČSSD – Jiří Havel
- KSČM – Miloslav Ransdorf
- KDU-ČSL – Zuzana Roithová
- SZ – Jan Dusík
- SNK-ED – Lukáš Macek

=== Campaign Finances ===
Party	ČSSD	ODS	KSČM	KDU-ČSL
Money Spent	60,000,000 Kč	40,000,000 Kč	17,000,000 Kč	2,500,000 Kč

== Debates ==
2009 European Parliament election in the Czech Republic debates
Date	Organisers	P Present A Absent			
Date	Organisers	ODS	ČSSD	KSČM	KDU–ČSL
2 June	Česká televize	P Jan Zahradil	P Jiří Havel	P Miloslav Ransdorf	P Zuzana Roithová

== Opinion polls ==
Polling Firm	Date	ODS	KSČM	KDU–ČSL	ČSSD	SZ	STAN	Others	Undecided
CVVM	2 – 9 March 2009	31%	12.5%	5%	29%	6.5%	—N/a	3%	13%
STEM	12–13 March 2009	23%	10%	—N/a	30%	—N/a	—N/a	—N/a	—N/a
CVVM	30 March – 6 April 2009	26%	13%	6%	28%	5.5%	—N/a	4.5%	17%
STEM	21 April 2009	27.6%	14.5%	6.6%	30.3%	6.6%	5.3%	9.1%	—N/a
STEM	5 May 2009	25%	11.4%	7.2%	30.9%	6%	N.A.%	6.4%	13.1%
CVVM	4–11 May 2009	33.0%	13.5%	5.5%	25.5%	5.0%	—N/a	6.5%	10.0%
STEM	5–12 May 2009	20.9%	8.9%	5.5%	24.2%	3.1%	N.A.%	11.9%	25.5%
CVVM	25 May 2009	36.5%	15.5%	6.5%	28.0%	5.5%	N.A.%	8%	
UPOL	25 May 2009	29.1%	14.8%	5.5%	29.8%	2.9%	3.3%	3.5%	
STEM/SC&C	26 May 2009	31.0%	13.0%	8.0%	27.0%	4.0%	2.0%	15.0%	
Election	5 June 2009	31.5%	14.2%	7.6%	22.4%	2.1%	2.3%	19.9%	0%

=== Media survey ===
Survey	Date	ODS	SSO	DSSS	KDU-ČSL	DSZ	STAN	SNK-ED<	ČSSD	Others
iDnes	4 May 2009	24.5	17.2	6.0	4.5	4.3	4.1	2.4	2.3	

== Results ==
The Civic Democratic Party (ODS) has won the election with 30% and 9 seats. Party's chairman Mirek Topolánek stated that the election showed that ODS is once again an equal rival to Social Democrats. Czech Social Democratic Party finished second with 22% of votes and 6 seats. Party was dissatisfied with the result as it expected a better result. Chairman Jiří Paroubek stated that party was damaged by low turnout but noted that it is improvement as the party received only 8.8% in 2004 election. Communist Party of Bohemia and Moravia considered the result as an improvement from 2006 parliamentary election. KDU-ČSL was pleased with the result as the party showed stable support. Other parties failed to reach 5% threshold. Green Party received only 2% of votes. Chairman Martin Bursík decided to resign as a result. Sovereignty led by MEP Jana Bobošíková received 4% and narrowly failed to win any seats.

Party	Votes	%	Seats	+/–
Civic Democratic Party	741,946	31.45	9	0
Czech Social Democratic Party	528,132	22.39	7	+5
Communist Party of Bohemia and Moravia	334,577	14.18	4	–2
KDU-ČSL	180,451	7.65	2	0
Sovereignty	100,514	4.26	0	New
European Democratic Party	68,152	2.89	0	New
Public Affairs	56,636	2.40	0	New
Mayors and Independents – Your Option	53,984	2.29	0	New
Green Party	48,621	2.06	0	0
SNK European Democrats	39,166	1.66	0	–3
Party of Free Citizens	29,846	1.27	0	New
Workers' Party	25,368	1.08	0	0
Right Bloc	23,612	1.00	0	0
Libertas.cz	22,243	0.94	0	New
Party for Dignified Life	17,061	0.72	0	New
Democratic Party of Greens	14,761	0.63	0	New
Independents	12,824	0.54	0	–2
Moravané	9,086	0.39	0	New
SPR-RSČ	7,492	0.32	0	0
Nejen hasiči a živnostníci s učiteli do Evropy	6,904	0.29	0	New
National Party	6,263	0.27	0	New
Humanist Party	4,584	0.19	0	0
Freeholder Party of the Czech Republic	4,544	0.19	0	New
Koruna Česká	4,449	0.19	0	0
Greens	3,717	0.16	0	New
Balbín's Poetic Party	3,711	0.16	0	0
Czech National Socialist Party	3,269	0.14	0	New
Liberals.cz	1,775	0.08	0	New
United Democrats – Association of Independents	1,501	0.06	0	New
Party of Free Democrats	1,423	0.06	0	New
Democracy and Freedom Party	986	0.04	0	New
Czech National Social Party	791	0.03	0	New
People and Politics	545	0.02	0	New
Total	2,358,934	100.00	22	–2
Valid votes	2,358,934	99.49		
Invalid/blank votes	12,075	0.51		
Total votes	2,371,009	100.00		
Registered voters/turnout	8,401,374	28.22		
Source: Volby

=== European groups ===
Party	Seats	+/–
European Conservatives and Reformists	9	New
Progressive Alliance of Socialists and Democrats	7	+5
European United Left–Nordic Green Left	4	–2
European People's Party	2	–12
Independence/Democracy	0	–2
Total	22	–2

=== Elected MEPs ===
Num	MEP	Sex	Party	EP Group	Period	Pref. Votes
1.	Evžen Tošenovský	Male	ODS	ECR	14 July 2009 – 30 June 2014	104,737
2.	Jan Zahradil	Male	ODS	ECR	14 July 2009 – 30 June 2014	65,731
3.	Miloslav Ransdorf	Male	KSČM	GUE-NGL	14 July 2009 – 30 June 2014	61,453
4.	Jiří Havel	Male	ČSSD	S&D	14 July 2009 – 8 July 2012	59,818
5.	Zuzana Roithová	Female	KDU–ČSL	EPP	14 July 2009 – 30 June 2014	52,503
6.	Richard Falbr	Male	ČSSD	S&D	14 July 2009 – 30 June 2014	44,703
7.	Vladimír Remek	Male	KSČM	GUE-NGL	14 July 2009 – 15 December 2013	40,650
8.	Jan Březina	Male	KDU–ČSL	EPP	14 July 2009 – 30 June 2014	23,154
9.	Libor Rouček	Male	ČSSD	S&D	14 July 2009 – 30 June 2014	19,771
10.	Hynek Fajmon	Male	ODS	ECR	14 July 2009 – 30 June 2014	16,041
11.	Andrea Češková	Female	ODS	ECR	14 July 2009 – 30 June 2014	14,477
12.	Oldřich Vlasák	Male	ODS	ECR	14 July 2009 – 30 June 2014	11,744
13.	Edvard Kožušník	Male	ODS	ECR	14 July 2009 – 30 June 2014	11,567
14.	Miroslav Ouzký	Male	ODS	ECR	14 July 2009 – 30 June 2014	9,869
15.	Olga Sehnalová	Female	ČSSD	S&D	14 July 2009 – 30 June 2014	9,386
16.	Jiří Maštálka	Male	KSČM	GUE-NGL	14 July 2009 – 30 June 2014	8,181
17.	Zuzana Brzobohatá	Female	ČSSD	S&D	14 July 2009 – 30 June 2014	7,736
18.	Milan Cabrnoch	Male	ODS	ECR	14 July 2009 – 30 June 2014	7,143
19.	Ivo Strejček	Male	ODS	ECR	14 July 2009 – 30 June 2014	6,071
20.	Jaromír Kohlíček	Male	KSČM	GUE-NGL	14 July 2009 – 30 June 2014	5,719
21.	Pavel Poc	Male	ČSSD	S&D	14 July 2009 – 30 June 2014	4,814
22.	Robert Dušek	Male	ČSSD	S&D	14 July 2009 – 30 June 2014	4,042
