= List of European Conservatives and Reformists members of the 8th European Parliament =

This is a list of European Conservatives and Reformists members of the European Parliament. The European Conservatives and Reformists (ECR) was founded in June 2009, and currently has 62 members in the European Parliament.

== List of members in 8th European Parliament (2014–2019) ==
Members' places of birth are in their respective countries that they represent unless otherwise indicated by a national flag next to the stated place of birth.

Name	Country	Constituency	Party	Born	In ECR since	MEP since	Notes
Nikolay Barekov	Bulgaria	Bulgaria	Reload Bulgaria	16 October 1972; Banya	2014	2014	ECR Bureau member.
Amjad Bashir	United Kingdom	Yorkshire and the Humber	Conservative Party	17 September 1952 (Pakistan) Gujrat City	2015	2014	Elected for UKIP. Joined 24 January 2015.
Bas Belder	Netherlands	Netherlands	Reformed Political Party	25 October 1946; Ridderkerk	2014	2014	ECPM member.
David Campbell Bannerman	United Kingdom	East of England	Conservative Party	28 May 1960 (India) Mumbai	2011	2009	Elected for UKIP. Joined 24 May 2011.
Brian Crowley	Ireland	South Ireland	Fianna Fáil	4 March 1964; Dublin	2014	1994	Not a member of the Fianna Fáil parliamentary party (which formally affiliates to ALDE). ECR Bureau member.
Ryszard Czarnecki	Poland	Kuyavian-Pomeranian	Law and Justice	25 January 1963 (United Kingdom) London	2009	2004	ECR Bureau member.
Peter van Dalen	Netherlands	Netherlands	ChristianUnion	3 September 1958; Zwijndrecht	2009	2009	ECR Bureau member. Elected for CU–SGP. Dutch delegation leader. ECPM member.
Daniel Dalton	United Kingdom	West Midlands	Conservative Party	1 January 1974; Oxford	2015	2015	Replaced Philip Bradbourn.
Mark Demesmaeker	Belgium	Dutch-speaking	New Flemish Alliance	12 September 1958; Halle	2014	2013	ECR Bureau member. Replaced Frieda Brepoels.
Nirj Deva	United Kingdom	South East England	Conservative Party	11 May 1948 (Sri Lanka) Colombo	2009	1999	
Jørn Dohrmann	Denmark	Denmark	Danish People's Party	9 January 1969; Kolding	2014	2014	
Andrzej Duda	Poland	Lesser Poland and Świętokrzyskie	Law and Justice	16 May 1972; Kraków	2014	2014	
Ian Duncan	United Kingdom	Scotland	Conservative Party	13 February 1973; Alyth	2014	2014	
Angel Dzhambazki	Bulgaria	Bulgaria	IMRO – Bulgarian National Movement	21 March 1979; Sofia	2014	2014	
Raffaele Fitto	Italy	Southern Italy	Conservatives and Reformists	28 August 1969; Maglie	2015	1999	Left Forza Italia and EPP in 2015 to form the Italian Conservatives and Reformists party and join the ECR group
Anna Fotyga	Poland	Pomeranian	Law and Justice	12 January 1957; Lębork	2014	2014	ECR Bureau member.
John Flack	United Kingdom	East of England	Conservative Party	3 January 1957; Romford	2017	2017	Replaced Vicky Ford.
Jacqueline Foster	United Kingdom	North West England	Conservative Party	30 December 1947; Liverpool	2009	1999	
Ashley Fox	United Kingdom	South West England	Conservative Party	15 November 1969; Sutton Coldfield	2009	2009	ECR Chief Whip.
Arne Gericke	Germany	Germany	Family Party of Germany	19 November 1964; Hamburg	2014	2014	ECPM member.
Julie Girling	United Kingdom	South West England	Conservative Party	21 December 1956; London	2009	2009	
Beata Gosiewska	Poland	Lesser Poland and Świętokrzyskie	Law and Justice	6 March 1971; Wysokie Mazowieckie	2014	2014	
Marek Gróbarczyk	Poland	Lubusz and West Pomeranian	Law and Justice	13 March 1968; Nowy Sącz	2009	2009	
Jussi Halla-aho	Finland	Finland	Finns Party	27 April 1971; Tampere	2014	2014	
Daniel Hannan	United Kingdom	South East England	Conservative Party	1 September 1971 (Peru) Lima	2009	1999	
Hans-Olaf Henkel	Germany	Germany	Alternative for Germany (2014 - 2015), Liberal Conservative Reformers (2015 - 2018), Independent (2018 - present)	14 March 1940; Hamburg	2014	2014	ECR Vice-president.
Dawid Jackiewicz	Poland	Lower Silesian and Opole	Law and Justice	18 March 1973; Wrocław	2014	2014	
Marek Jurek	Poland	Warsaw	Right Wing of the Republic	28 June 1960; Gorzów Wielkopolski	2014	2014	
Syed Kamall	United Kingdom	London	Conservative Party	15 February 1967; London	2009	2005	ECR Chairman. Replaced Theresa Villiers.
Sajjad Karim	United Kingdom	North West England	Conservative Party	11 July 1970; Blackburn	2009	2004	
Rikke Karlsson	Denmark	Denmark	Danish People's Party	29 April 1965; Svenstrup	2014	2014	
Karol Karski	Poland	Podlaskie and Warmian-Masurian	Law and Justice	13 May 1966; Warsaw	2014	2014	ECR Bureau member.
Timothy Kirkhope	United Kingdom	Yorkshire and the Humber	Conservative Party	29 April 1945; Newcastle	2009	1999	ECR Deputy Chairman
Bernd Kölmel	Germany	Germany	Alternative for Germany (2014 - 2015), Liberal Conservative Reformers (2015 - 2018), Independent (2018 - present)	8 December 1958; Rastatt	2014	2014	
Zdzisław Krasnodębski	Poland	Warsaw	Law and Justice	11 April 1953; Choszczno	2014	2014	
Zbigniew Kuźmiuk	Poland	Masovian	Law and Justice	19 September 1956; Komorowo	2014	2014	
Ryszard Legutko	Poland	Lower Silesian and Opole	Law and Justice	24 December 1949; Kraków	2009	2009	ECR Vice-president. Polish delegation leader.
Andrew Lewer	United Kingdom	East Midlands	Conservative Party	18 July 1971; Burnley	2014	2014	
Sander Loones	Belgium	Dutch-speaking	New Flemish Alliance	26 January 1979; Veurne	2014	2014	
Bernd Lucke	Germany	Germany	Alternative for Germany (2014 - 2015), Liberal Conservative Reformers (2015 - present)	19 August 1962; Berlin	2014	2014	ECR Bureau member.
Monica Macovei	Romania	Romania	M10	4 February 1959; Bucharest	2015	2014	Left EPP group on 27 October 2015
Notis Marias	Greece	Greece	Independent Greeks	5 April 1957; Thessaloniki	2014	2014	ECR Vice-president.
Emma McClarkin	United Kingdom	East Midlands	Conservative Party	9 October 1978; Stroud	2009	2009	ECR Co-Treasurer. ECR Bureau member.
Anthea McIntyre	United Kingdom	West Midlands	Conservative Party	29 June 1954; London	2011	2011	Shadow MEP from 1 December 2009 to 1 December 2011.
Morten Messerschmidt	Denmark	Denmark	Danish People's Party	13 November 1980; Frederikssund	2014	2009	ECR Vice-president.
Jim Nicholson	United Kingdom	Northern Ireland	Ulster Unionist Party	29 January 1945; Armagh	2009	1989	Elected for UCUNF in 2009. ECR Bureau member.
Stanisław Ożóg	Poland	Subcarpathian	Law and Justice	27 May 1953; Sokołów Małopolski	2014	2014	
Bolesław Piecha	Poland	Silesian	Law and Justice	19 September 1954; Rybnik	2014	2014	
Mirosław Piotrowski	Poland	Lublin	Law and Justice	9 January 1966; Zielona Góra	2009	2004	
Tomasz Poręba	Poland	Subcarpathian	Law and Justice	31 March 1973; Zielona Góra	2009	2009	ECR Bureau member.
Remo Sernagiotto	Italy	North-East Italy	Conservatives and Reformists	1 September 1955; Montebelluna	2015	2014	Left Forza Italia and EPP in 2015 to join the ECR group under the newly formed Italian Conservatives and Reformists party
Branislav Škripek	Slovakia	Slovakia	Ordinary People	30 August 1970; Piešťany	2014	2014	ECR Bureau member. ECPM member.
Joachim Starbatty	Germany	Germany	Alternative for Germany (2014 - 2015), Liberal Conservative Reformers (2015 - 2018), Independent (2018 - present)	9 May 1940; Düsseldorf	2014	2014	
Helga Stevens	Belgium	Dutch-speaking	New Flemish Alliance	9 August 1968; Sint-Truiden	2014	2014	ECR Vice-president.
Richard Sulík	Slovakia	Slovakia	Freedom and Solidarity	12 January 1968; Bratislava	2014	2014	
Kay Swinburne	United Kingdom	Wales	Conservative Party	8 June 1967; Aberystwyth	2009	2009	
Charles Tannock	United Kingdom	London	Conservative Party	25 September 1957; Aldershot	2009	1999	
Sampo Terho	Finland	Finland	Finns Party	20 September 1977; Helsinki	2014	2014	ECR Bureau member.
Valdemar Tomaševski	Lithuania	Lithuania	Electoral Action of Poles in Lithuania	3 March 1965; Vilnius	2009	2009	Party leader. ECR Bureau member. Lithuanian delegation leader.
Ruža Tomašić	Croatia	Croatia	Independent	10 May 1958 (Bosnia and Herzegovina) Mladoševica	2013	2013	Became an MEP on upon Croatian accession. Elected for HSP-AS. ECR Bureau member. Croatian delegation leader.
Evžen Tošenovský	Czech Republic	Czech Republic	Civic Democratic Party	26 February 1956; Ostrava	2009	2009	
Ulrike Trebesius	Germany	Germany	Alternative for Germany (2014 - 2015), Liberal Conservative Reformers (2015 - 2018), Independent (2018 - present)	17 April 1970; Halle (Saale)	2014	2014	
Kazimierz Michał Ujazdowski	Poland	Lower Silesian and Opole	Law and Justice	28 July 1964; Kielce	2014	2014	
Anneleen Van Bossuyt	Belgium	Dutch-speaking	New Flemish Alliance	10 January 1980; Ghent	2014	2014	Replaced Johan Van Overtveldt.
Geoffrey Van Orden	United Kingdom	East of England	Conservative Party	10 April 1945; Waterlooville	2009	1999	ECR Vice-president.
Anders Primdahl Vistisen	Denmark	Denmark	Danish People's Party	12 November 1987; Viborg	2014	2014	
Jadwiga Wiśniewska	Poland	Silesian	Law and Justice	2 July 1963; Myszków	2014	2014	
Janusz Wojciechowski	Poland	Łódź	Law and Justice	6 December 1954; Rawa Mazowiecka	2009	2004	
Jan Zahradil	Czech Republic	Czech Republic	Civic Democratic Party	30 March 1963; Prague	2009	2004	ECR Bureau member. Czech delegation leader. Former ECR Chairman.
Roberts Zīle	Latvia	Latvia	National Alliance	20 June 1958; Riga	2009	2004	ECR Bureau member. Latvian delegation leader.
Jana Žitňanská	Slovakia	Slovakia	New Majority	14 May 1974; Bratislava	2014	2014	
Kosma Złotowski	Poland	Kuyavian-Pomeranian	Law and Justice	14 January 1964; Bydgoszcz	2014	2014	

== Former members ==
The party denoted is the party for whom the MEP was elected.

Name	Country	Constituency	Party	Born	Notes
Tadeusz Cymański	Poland	Pomeranian	Law and Justice	6 June 1955; Nowy Staw	ECR member 2009–11. MEP 2009–14. Joined United Poland and EFD on 26 December 2011.
Roger Helmer	United Kingdom	East Midlands	Conservative Party	25 January 1944; London	ECR member 2009–12. MEP 1999–. Joined UKIP and EFD on 2 March 2012.
Jacek Kurski	Poland	Podlaskie and Warmian-Masurian	Law and Justice	22 February 1966; Gdańsk	ECR member 2009–11. MEP 2009–14. Joined United Poland and EFD on 26 December 2011.
Zbigniew Ziobro	Poland	Lesser Poland and Świętokrzyskie	Law and Justice	18 August 1970; Kraków	ECR member 2009–11. MEP 2009–14. Joined United Poland and EFD on 26 December 2011.
Jacek Włosowicz	Poland	Lesser Poland and Świętokrzyskie	Law and Justice	25 January 1966; Skalbmierz	ECR member 2009–11. MEP 2009–14. Joined United Poland and EFD on 26 December 2011.
Edward McMillan-Scott	United Kingdom	Yorkshire and the Humber	Conservative Party	15 August 1949; Cambridge	ECR member 2009. MEP 1984–2014. Left ECR on 14 July 2009. Joined Lib Dems in 2010.
Marta Andreasen	United Kingdom	South East England	Conservative Party	26 November 1954 (Argentina) Buenos Aires	ECR member 2013–14. MEP 2009–14. Elected for UKIP. Joined 22 February 2013. Failed to get re-elected.
Robert Atkins	United Kingdom	North West England	Conservative Party	5 February 1946; London	ECR member 2009–14. MEP 1999–2014. Did not stand for re-election.
Adam Bielan	Poland	Masovian	Poland Together	12 September 1974; Gdańsk	ECR member 2009–14. MEP 2004–14. Elected for PiS, joined PJN in 2010, then Poland Together in 2013. Failed to get re-elected.
Lajos Bokros	Hungary	Hungary	Modern Hungary Movement	26 June 1954; Budapest	ECR member 2009–14. MEP 2009–14. Elected for the Hungarian Democratic Forum, founded MoMa on 21 April 2013. Did not stand for re-election.
Philip Bradbourn	United Kingdom	West Midlands	Conservative Party	9 August 1951; Tipton	ECR member 2009–14. MEP 2009–14. Died 19 December 2014.
Milan Cabrnoch	Czech Republic	Czech Republic	Civic Democratic Party	6 August 1962; Čáslav	ECR member 2009–14. MEP 2004–14. Did not stand for re-election.
Martin Callanan	United Kingdom	North East England	Conservative Party	8 August 1961; Newcastle	ECR member 2009–14. MEP 1999–2014. ECR Chairman 2011–14. Failed to get re-elected.
Andrea Češková	Czech Republic	Czech Republic	Civic Democratic Party	18 October 1971; Prague	ECR member 2009–14. MEP 2009–14. Did not stand for re-election.
Giles Chichester	United Kingdom	South West England	Conservative Party	29 July 1946; London	ECR member 2009–14. MEP 1999–14. Did not stand for re-election.
Susy De Martini	Italy	North-West Italy	The Right	17 June 1952; Genoa	ECR member 2013–14. MEP 2013–14. Elected for The People of Freedom. Became an MEP in February 2013. Joined ECR in March 2013. Failed to get re-elected.
James Elles	United Kingdom	South East England	Conservative Party	3 September 1949; London	ECR member 2009–14. MEP 1984–2014. Did not stand for re-election.
Derk Jan Eppink	Belgium	Dutch-speaking	Libertarian, Direct, Democratic	7 November 1958 (Netherlands) Steenderen	ECR member 2009–14. MEP 2009–14. Vice-chairman. Belgian delegation leader. Did not stand for re-election.
Hynek Fajmon	Czech Republic	Czech Republic	Civic Democratic Party	17 May 1968; Nymburk	ECR member 2009–14. MEP 2004–14. ECR Co-Treasurer. Did not stand for re-election.
Malcolm Harbour	United Kingdom	West Midlands	Conservative Party	19 February 1947; Woking	ECR member 2009–14. MEP 1999–2014. Did not stand for re-election.
Michał Kamiński	Poland	Warsaw	Independent	28 March 1972; Warsaw	ECR member 2009–14. MEP 2009–14. Former ECR Chairman. Elected for PiS, joined Poland Comes First in 2010, then Civic Platform in 2014. Failed to get re-elected.
Paweł Kowal	Poland	Lesser Poland and Świętokrzyskie	Poland Together	22 July 1975; Rzeszów	ECR member 2009–14. MEP 2009–14. Elected for PiS, joined Poland Comes First in 2010, then Poland Together in 2013. Failed to get re-elected.
Edvard Kožušník	Czech Republic	Czech Republic	Civic Democratic Party	30 January 1971; Olomouc	ECR member 2009–14. MEP 2009–14. Failed to get re-elected.
Marek Migalski	Poland	Silesian	Poland Together	14 January 1969; Racibórz	ECR member 2009–14. MEP 2009–14. Elected for PiS, joined Poland Comes First in 2010, then Poland Together in 2013. Failed to get re-elected.
Cristiana Muscardini	Italy	North-West Italy	Conservatives and Social Reformers	6 November 1948; Cannobio	ECR member 2012–14. MEP 1989–2014. Joined ECR in October 2012. Elected for The People of Freedom, joined CSR in 2012. Failed to get re-elected.
Miroslav Ouzký	Czech Republic	Czech Republic	Civic Democratic Party	18 August 1958; Chlumec n.Cidlinou	ECR member 2009–14. MEP 2004–14. Did not stand for re-election.
Marcus Pretzell	Germany	Germany	Alternative for Germany	16 July 1973; Rinteln	MEP since 2014. ECR member 2014–16, until expelled.
Anna Rosbach	Denmark	Denmark	Independent	2 February 1947; Gladsaxe	ECR member 2011–14. MEP 2009–14. Elected for Danish People's Party. Joined 9 March 2011. Did not stand for re-election.
Struan Stevenson	United Kingdom	Scotland	Conservative Party	4 April 1948; Ballantrae	ECR member 2009–14. MEP 1999–2014. Did not stand for re-election.
Beatrix von Storch	Germany	Germany	Alternative for Germany	27 May 1971; Lübeck	MEP since 2014. ECR member 2014–16, left to join EFDD. ECPM member.
Ivo Strejček	Czech Republic	Czech Republic	Civic Democratic Party	11 January 1962; Nové Město n.Moravě	ECR member 2009–14. MEP 2004–14. Did not stand for re-election.
Robert Sturdy	United Kingdom	East of England	Conservative Party	22 June 1944; Wetherby	ECR member 2009–14. MEP 1999–2014. Did not stand for re-election.
Konrad Szymański	Poland	Greater Poland	Law and Justice	6 December 1969; Kalisz	ECR member 2009–14. MEP 2004–14. Did not stand for re-election.
Johan Van Overtveldt	Belgium	Dutch-speaking	New Flemish Alliance	24 August 1955; Mortsel	ECR member 2014. MEP 2014. Resigned to become Minister of Finance.
Oldřich Vlasák	Czech Republic	Czech Republic	Civic Democratic Party	26 November 1955; Hradec Králové	ECR member 2009–14. MEP 2004–14. Failed to get re-elected.
Marina Yannakoudakis	United Kingdom	London	Conservative Party	16 April 1956; London	ECR member 2009–14. MEP 2009–14. Failed to get re-elected.
Artur Zasada	Poland	Lubusz and West Pomeranian	Poland Together	5 June 1969; Zielona Góra	ECR member 2013–14. MEP 2009–14. Elected for Civic Platform, joined Poland Together in 2013. Failed to get re-elected.
