= Jaroslav Zvěřina =

Czech politician (1942–2026)

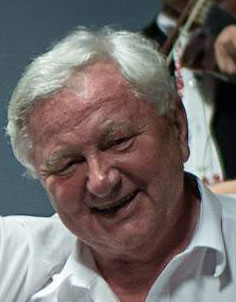
- Zvěřina in 2017
- Born: 18 December 1942; Třebíč, Protectorate of Bohemia and Moravia
- Died: 19 July 2026 (aged 83); Tábor, Czech Republic
- Occupations: Medical doctor, politician, psychiatrist, sexologist
- Employer: First Faculty of Medicine, Charles University
- Political party: Civic Democratic Party
- Website: http://www.zverina.cz/

Jaroslav Zvěřina Czech pronunciation (18 December 1942 – 19 July 2026) was a Czech politician who was a Member of the European Parliament with the Civic Democratic Party, part of the European Democrats and sat on the European Parliament's Committee on Legal Affairs. He was also a candidate in the European Parliament election in 2009, but was not reelected.

Zvěřina was a substitute for the Committee on Culture and Education and a vice-chair of the Delegation for Relations with Japan.

Zvěřina died in Tábor on 19 July 2026, at the age of 83.

== Education ==
- 1965: Doctor of Medicine (Faculty of Medicine, Charles University, Hradec Králové)
- 1990: holder of the postgraduate qualification 'Candidate of Sciences' and senior lecturer (First Faculty of Medicine, Charles University, Prague)

== Career ==
- 1965–1969: Doctor
- 1969–1977: Specialised doctor
- 1977–1992: Research fellow
- from 1989: Head of the Institute of Sexology of the First Faculty of Medicine, Charles University, Prague
- from 1994: Chairman of the Tábor district association of ODS (Civic Democratic Party)
- from 1994: Member of Tábor Town Council
- 1998: Vice-Chairman of the Chamber of Deputies of the Parliament of the Czech Republic
- 1998–2002: Chairman of the Committee for European Integration of the Chamber of Deputies of the Parliament of the Czech Republic
- 2002–2004: Vice-Chairman of the Committee for European Affairs of the Chamber of Deputies of the Parliament of the Czech Republic
- from 1990: Chairman of the Sexological Society of the Czech Medical Association
- from 2001: Member of the supervisory board of the benevolent society 'Česká hlava'

== Cooperation ==
- Konrad Adenauer Foundation

== See also ==
- 2004 European Parliament election in the Czech Republic
