= Stanisław Ożóg =

Stanisław Ożóg may refer to:

- Stanisław Ożóg (politician) (born 1953), Polish politician for Law and Justice party
- Stanisław Ożóg (runner) (1930–1998), Polish Olympic distance runner
