= Sehnal =

Sehnal (Czech feminine: Sehnalová) is a surname. It may refer to:

- Ladislav Sehnal (1931–2011), Czech astronomer
- Olga Sehnalová (born 1968), Czech politician
- Ondřej Sehnal (born 1997), Czech basketball player
