= Blue Team (Czech politics) =

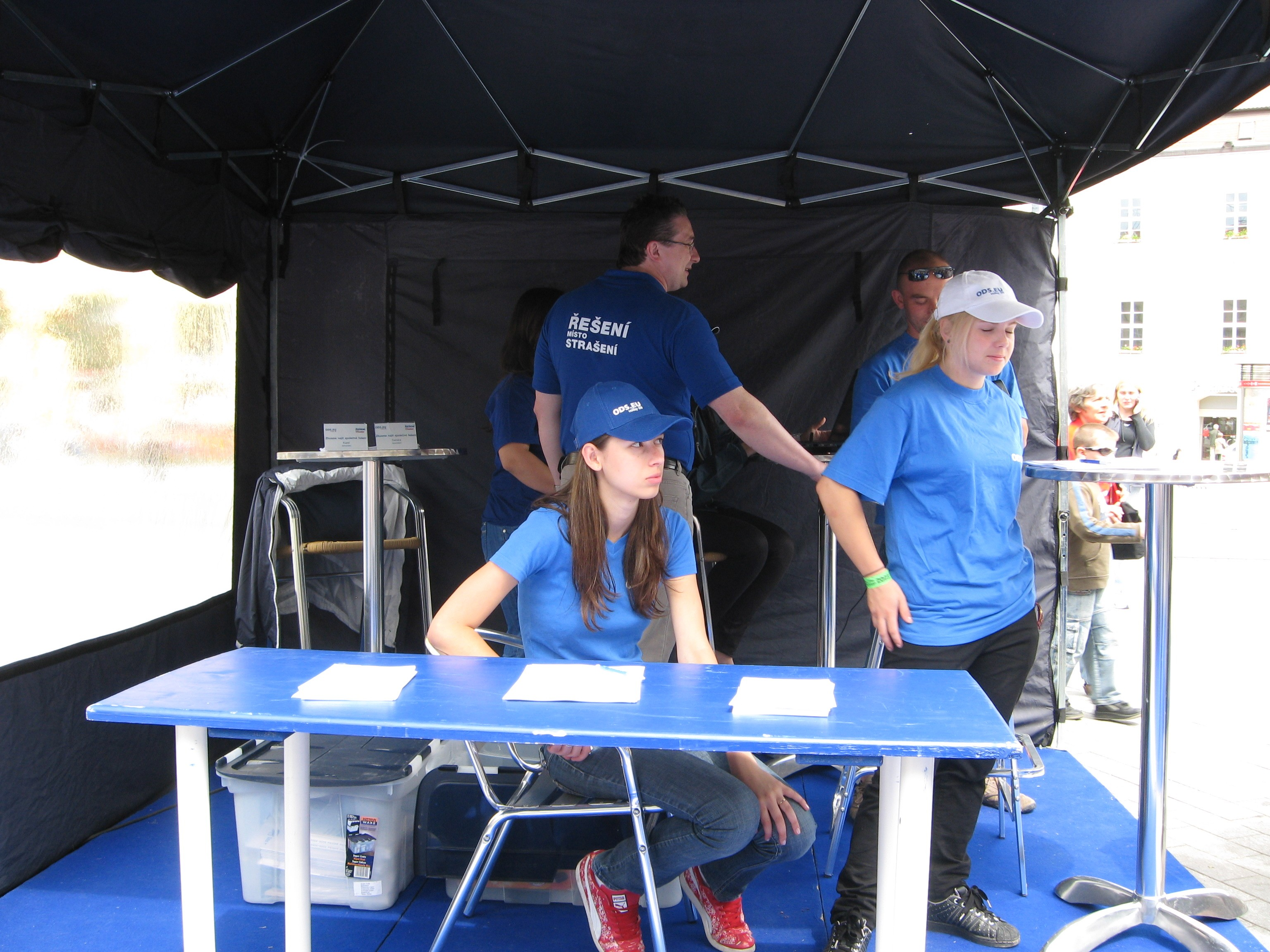
Blue Team kiosk during an election campaign in Brno

In Czech politics, the Blue Team (Czech: Modrý tým) was a members organisation of the Civic Democratic Party (ODS), whose purpose, as stated on its website, was to help at ODS meetings, promote right-wing political ideas, promote the team itself, analyse opinion polls, and recruit new members.

== History ==
The Blue Team was founded on 29 April 2009, inspired by similar projects in other countries. It was first used during the 2009 European parliament election campaign, after which Mirek Topolánek stated that the Blue Team helped ODS win the election.

During a meeting in May 2010, members of the Blue Team played airsoft, prompting Jaroslav Tvrdík, campaign manager of the Czech Social Democratic Party (ČSSD), to accuse the Blue Team of training commandos to interrupt ČSSD meetings, and compare the Blue Team with the Nazi Party. ODS responded that Tvrdík's interpretation was "mentally invalid", and the Blue Team sued Tvrdík for slander. On 1 July 2011, a court ordered the ČSSD leadership to apologise for Tvrdík's comments.

Other Blue Team activities include helping to clear damage following floods, and the 2013 legislative election campaign. Mirek Topolánek, Jan Zahradil, Evžen Tošenovský, Edvard Kožušník and other party officials appeared at meetings with members of the team.

The Blue Team ceased its activity in 2015, and was replaced by Supporters of ODS.

== Membership ==
2009	2010	2012
1,400	9,000	10,135

== Notable members ==
- Tomáš Berdych
- Jaromír Jágr

== See also ==
- Civic Democratic Party
