= Neukirchen-Vluyn =

- Town
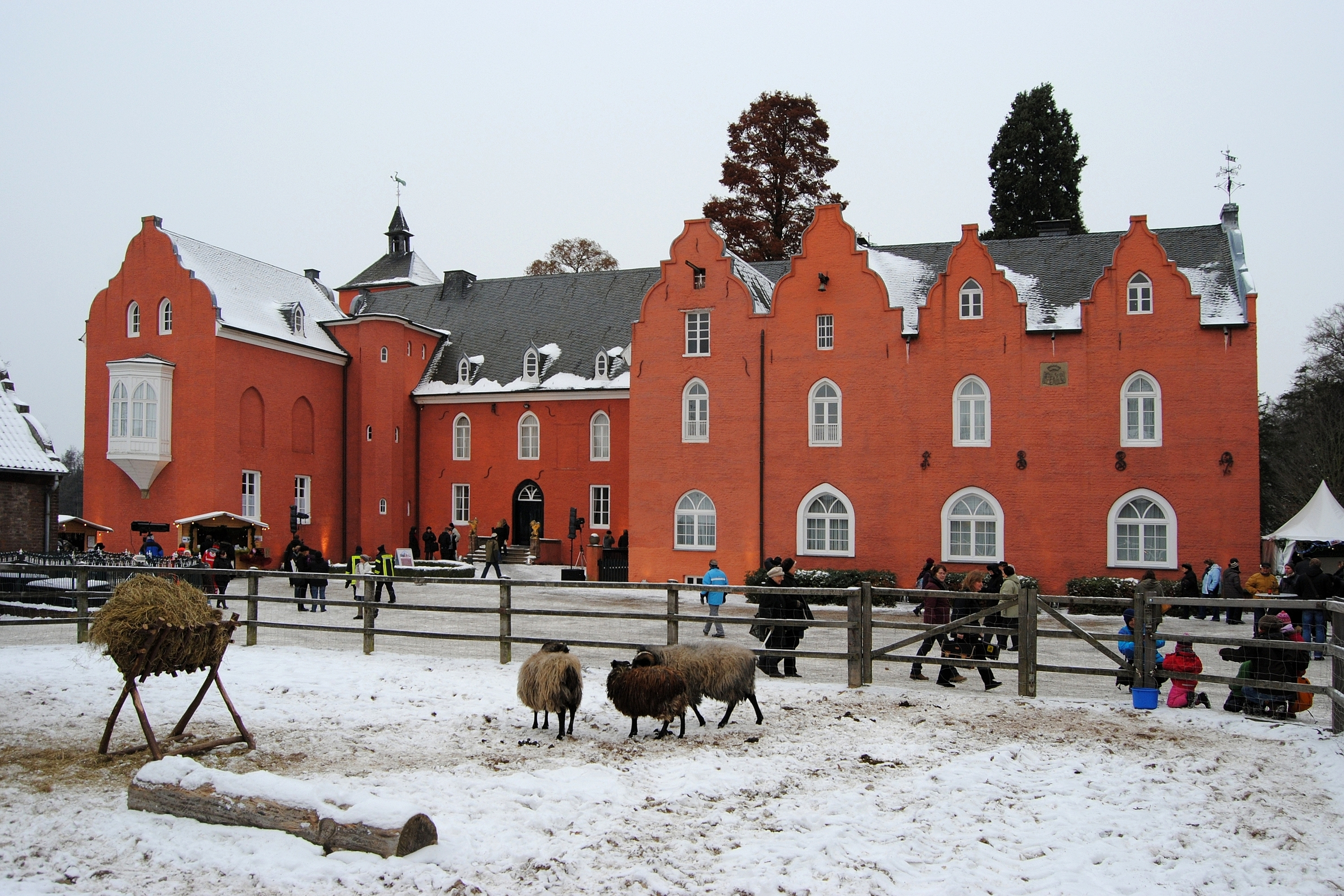
- Bloemersheim Castle

- Coat of arms

- Location of Neukirchen-Vluyn within Wesel district
- Interactive map of Neukirchen-Vluyn
- Location within Germany Location within North Rhine-Westphalia
- Coordinates: 51°26′30″N 6°33′30″E
- Country: Germany
- State: North Rhine-Westphalia
- Admin. region: Düsseldorf
- District: Wesel
- Subdivisions: 4

Government
  - Mayor (2020–25): Ralf Köpke (SPD)

Area
  - Total: 43.5 km^{2} (16.8 sq mi)
- Elevation: 15 m (49 ft)

Population (2025-12-31)
  - Total: 27,410
  - Density: 630/km^{2} (1,630/sq mi)
- Time zone: UTC+01:00 (CET)
  - Summer (DST): UTC+02:00 (CEST)
- Postal codes: 47506
- Dialling codes: 0 28 45
- Vehicle registration: WES
- Website: www.neukirchen-vluyn.de

Neukirchen-Vluyn (German pronunciation: [nɔʏˌkɪʁçn̩ˈflyːn]) is a town in the district of Wesel, in North Rhine-Westphalia, Germany. It is situated approximately 5 km west of Moers, and 15 km north of Krefeld.

== Population ==
Historical population

Year	Pop.	±% p.a.
1965	22,113	—
1970	23,657	+1.36%
1975	24,124	+0.39%
1980	25,519	+1.13%
1985	25,281	−0.19%
1990	26,591	+1.02%
1995	27,571	+0.73%

Year	Pop.	±% p.a.
2000	28,525	+0.68%
2005	28,650	+0.09%
2010	27,579	−0.76%
2015	27,178	−0.29%
2020	27,532	+0.26%
2025	27,410	−0.09%

Source: Landesdatabank Nordrhein-Westfalen

== Mayors ==
Mayors since 1836:

- 1836–1875 Gustav Haarbeck
- 1875–1923 Hermann Haarbeck
- 1923–1928 Dr. Baehr
- 1928–1945 Erich Neumann (NSDAP)
- 1945–1946 Wilhelm Schneider (appointed by military government)
- 1946–1950 Tillmann Bongardt (CDU)
- 1950–1952 Oskar Kühnel (SPD)
- 1952–1956 Johann Kaiser (SPD)
- 1956–1963 Oskar Kühnel (SPD)
- 1963–1975 Gerhard Haastert (CDU)
- 1975–1989 Oskar Böhm (SPD)
- 1989–1994 Kornelia Kuhn (CDU)
- 1994–1999 Peter Wermke (SPD) (last voluntary Mayor)
- 1999–2009 Bernd Böing (parteilos) (first full-time Mayor)
- 2009–2020 Harald Lenßen (CDU)
- since 2020 Ralf Köpke (SPD)

== Economy ==
The Trox Group has its headquarters in Neukirchen-Vluyn. There are other large businesses in town: Arinox, MEDA, Pionier Absaugtechnik, Schwing Technologies, LED Linear, Ornua.

== Sights ==
Mills, typically to those found in the Netherlands, from the 18th and 19th century, colonies of coal minings as well as the water castle Bloemersheim are witnesses of Neukirchen-Vluyn's history. Historical city tours and the local museum display the influence of agriculture and mining on the development of the town. The museum is located in the cultural hall "Kulturhalle", where one can enjoy exhibitions of art and live music on a regular basis. The classical concerts in the courtyard of the castle are further a constant in Neukirchen-Vluyn's entertainment schedule. For recreation, the town offers various trails for horseback riding and hiking as well as a golf course.

== Twin towns – sister cities ==
Neukirchen-Vluyn is twinned with:

- Buckingham, England, United Kingdom
- Mouvaux, France
- Ustroń, Poland

== Notable people ==
- Karl-Heinz Florenz (born 1947), politician (CDU), since 1989 member of the European Parliament
- Christopher Lutz (born 1971), chess grandmaster
- Kostas Mitroglou (born 1988), Greek footballer; grew up here
