= Nina Škottová =

Czech politician (1946–2018)

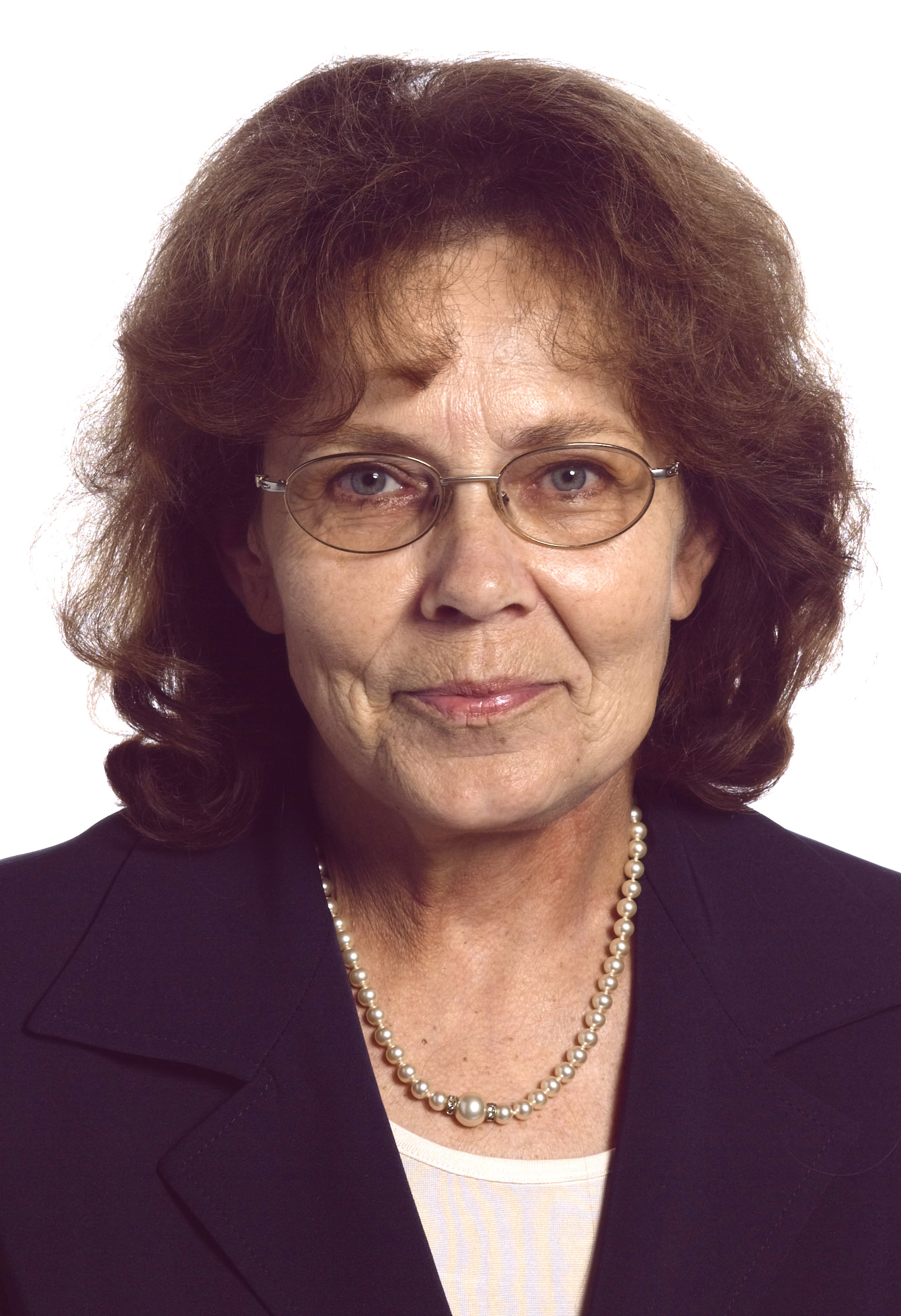

Nina Škottová (6 October 1946, in Prostějov – 28 April 2018, in Bedihošť) was a Czech politician and Member of the European Parliament with the Civic Democratic Party, part of the European Democrats and sat on the European Parliament's Committee on Budgets.

She was a substitute for the Committee on Culture and Education and a member of the Delegation for relations with Switzerland, Iceland and Norway and to the European Economic Area (EEA) Joint Parliamentary Committee.

== Education ==
- 1973: Doctor of Natural Sciences (Faculty of Pharmacy, Comenius University, Bratislava)
- 1979: holder of the postgraduate qualification 'Candidate of Sciences' (Faculty of Pharmacy, Comenius University, Bratislava)
- 1990: Senior lecturer (Faculty of Medicine, Palacký University of Olomouc)

== Career ==
- 1972–1982: Research fellow
- 1982–1990: Specialised assistant professor
- since 1990: Senior lecturer
- 1999–2004: Head of the Institute of Pharmacology
- 1998–2000: Vice-chairwoman of the Prostějov area local association of ODS (Civic Democratic Party)
- since 2000: Member of the Prostějov area local association of ODS

== See also ==
- 2004 European Parliament election in the Czech Republic
