= Tomáš Zatloukal =

Czech educator and politician (born 1969)

Tomáš Zatloukal (born August 3, 1969 in Gottwaldov, Czechoslovakia) is a Czech educator, politician, and former Member of the European Parliament with the Union of Independents, part of the European People's Party and sat on the European Parliament's Committee on Culture and Education.

He was a substitute for the Committee on Budgets and a member of the Delegation to the EU-Kazakhstan, EU-Kyrgyzstan and EU-Uzbekistan Parliamentary Cooperation Committees, and for relations with Tajikistan, Turkmenistan and Mongolia.

== Education ==
- 1992: Master's degree

== Career ==
- 1993-1998: Teacher
- since 1998: Secondary school headmaster
- 2002: Member of Napajedla Town Council and member of Napajedla Town Board
- 20 July 2004 – 13 July 2009: MEP and member of the EPP for the 6th European Parliament

== See also ==
2004 European Parliament election in the Czech Republic
