= Karl-Heinz Florenz =

German politician (born 1947)

Karl-Heinz Florenz MEP
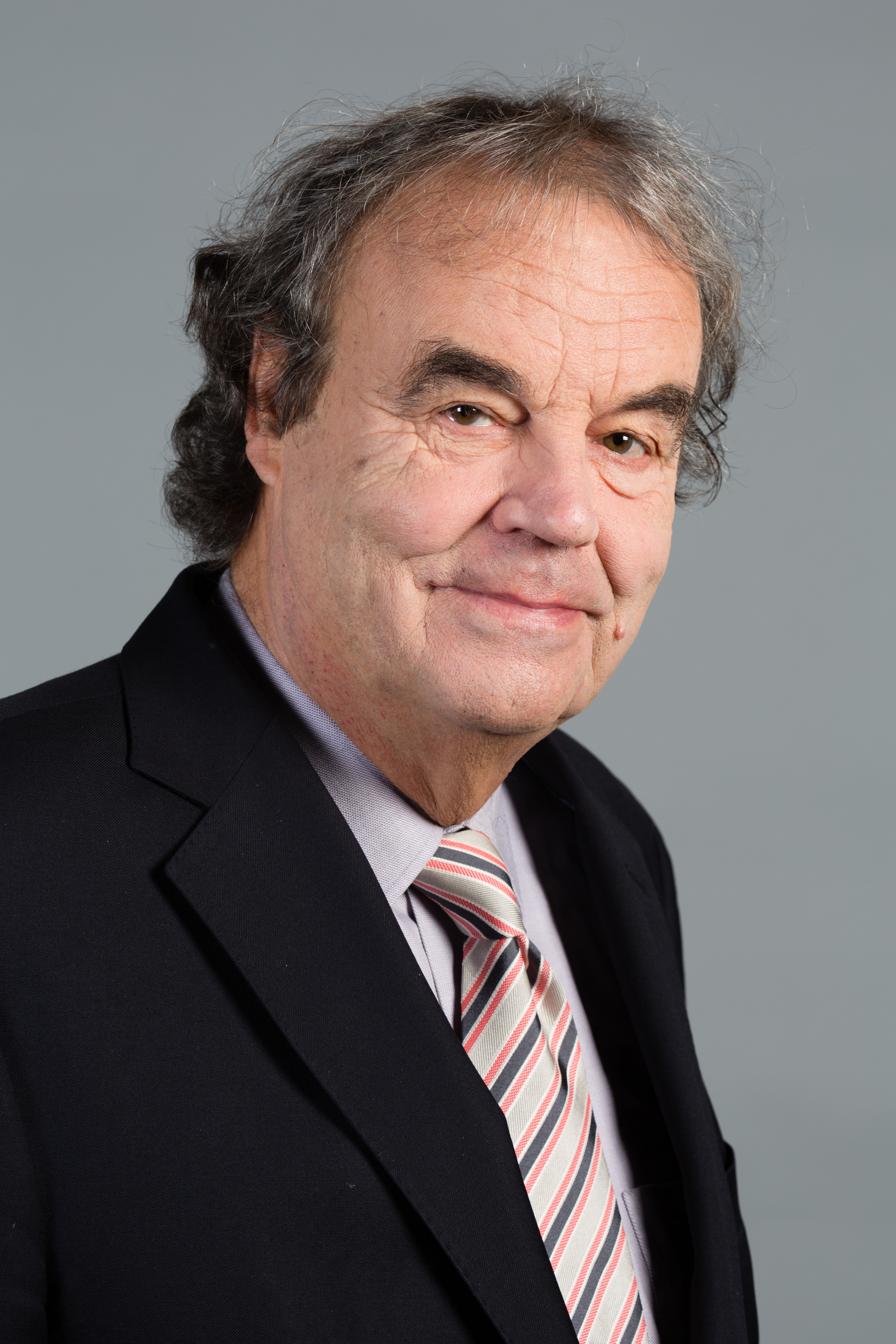

Member of the European Parliament
- In office 1 July 1989 – 1 July 2019
- Constituency: Germany

Personal details
- Born: 22 October 1947 (age 78) Neukirchen-Vluyn, North Rhine-Westphalia, Germany
- Party: German; Christian Democratic Union of Germany; EU; European People's Party
- Website: www.karl-heinz-florenz.de

Karl-Heinz Florenz (born 22 October 1947) is a German politician who served as Member of the European Parliament (MEP) from 1999 until 2012. He is a member of the Christian Democratic Union of Germany (CDU), part of the European People's Party.

== Political career ==
Florenz first became a Member of the European Parliament in the 1989 European elections. He has since been serving on the Committee on the Environment, Public Health and Food Safety. On 23 July 2004 he was elected committee's chairman, but later succeeded by Miroslav Ouzký on 1 February 2007 as part of a reshuffle. He served as the committee's shadow rapporteur on the circular economy.

In addition to his work on the Committee on the Environment, Public Health and Food Safety, Florenz served as member of the Parliament's Temporary Committee on Climate Change between 2007 and 2009. He was also part of the European Parliament’s delegations to the 2007 United Nations Climate Change Conference in Bali; the 2008 United Nations Climate Change Conference in Poznań; the 2009 United Nations Climate Change Conference in Copenhagen; the 2013 United Nations Climate Change Conference in Warsaw; the 2014 United Nations Climate Change Conference in Lima; and the 2015 United Nations Climate Change Conference in Paris.

Within the CDU, Florenz was a member of the party's leadership in the Rhein-Kreis Neuss region, alongside Hermann Gröhe and others.

In November 2017, Florenz announced that he would not stand in the 2019 European elections but instead resign from active politics by the end of the parliamentary term.

== Other activities ==
- Deutsche Umweltstiftung, Member of the Advisory Board
- Lions Club, Member

== Political positions ==
Known for owning a Mercedes car, Florenz voted against a non-binding 2007 report on how to reduce vehicle greenhouse gas emissions.
