= Richard Falbr =

Czech politician (1940–2026)

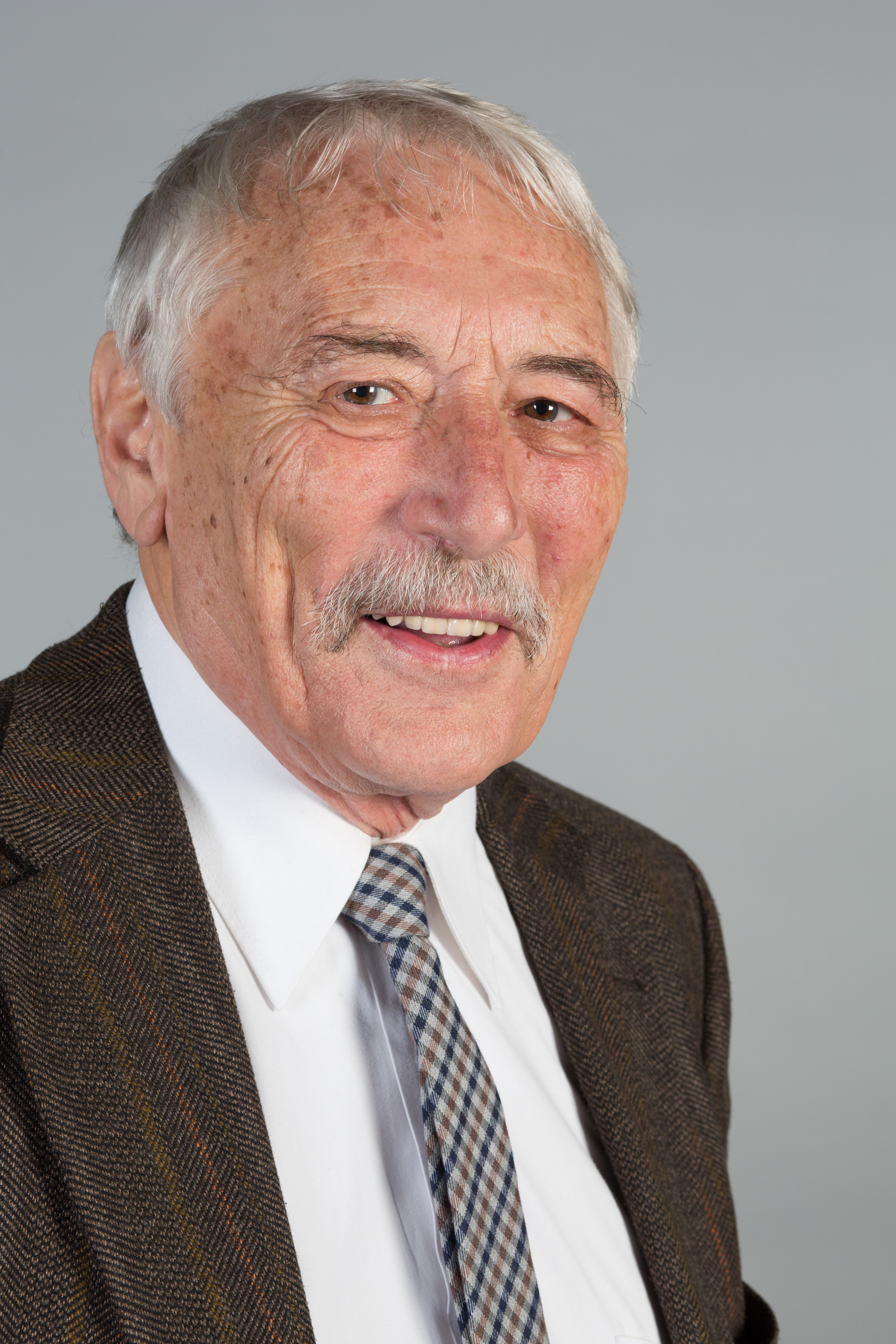
Falbr in 2014

Richard Falbr (29 September 1940 – 13 May 2026) was a Czech politician. He was a Member of the European Parliament (MEP) from 2004 to 2014, representing the Czech Social Democratic Party, part of the Party of European Socialists.

== Early life ==
Falbr was born in Chester, England, during World War II, in which his father served in the fighter squadron. His mother was of Spanish descent. After the end of the war, the family lived briefly in the UK and Czechoslovakia, before Falbr's father was sent to work in the embassy in Venezuela, where Richard attended primary school. The family returned to Czechoslovakia in 1953.

== Communist era ==
Falbr worked as a foreign-language correspondent from 1959 to 1963, then as a language teacher for the communist secret police until 1969.

In 1969, Falbr graduated from the Law Faculty of Charles University in Prague as a Doctor of Jurisprudence. Following this, he worked as a trade union lawyer for 19 years, until the Velvet Revolution.

== Post-communist career ==
From 1990, Falbr was active in trade union politics, as vice-chair of the Czech and Slovak Confederation of Trade Unions (1990–1994) and chair of the Bohemian-Moravian Service Workers' Trade Union (1990–1998), going on to serve as chair of the Czech-Moravian Confederation of Trade Unions from 1994 until 2002. He was also involved in international trade union bodies, serving as a member of the administration of the International Confederation of Free Trade Unions (1992–2002), the governing body of the International Labour Organization (1993–2002), and the administration of the European Trade Union Confederation (1995–2002).

Falbr was the vice-chair of the Czech Social Democratic Party (ČSSD) for 1991–1992, and in 1996 was elected to the Czech Senate representing the city of Most. While a Senator, Falbr was a member (1996–2004) and vice-chair (1998–2002) of the Committee on Legal and Constitutional Affairs, a member of the Committee on Mandate and Parliamentary Privilege (2002–2004), and a member of the Standing Senate Commission on the Constitution of the Czech Republic (2002–2004).

== European Parliament ==
Falbr sat as an MEP from 2004 to 2014. He sat on the European Parliament's Committee on Employment and Social Affairs, and was a substitute for the Committee on Regional Development, a member of the Delegation for relations with the countries of Central America and a substitute for the Delegation for relations with Mercosur.

== Death ==
Falbr died on 13 May 2026, at the age of 85.

== See also ==
- 2004 European Parliament election in the Czech Republic
