= Zuzana Brzobohatá =

Czech politician

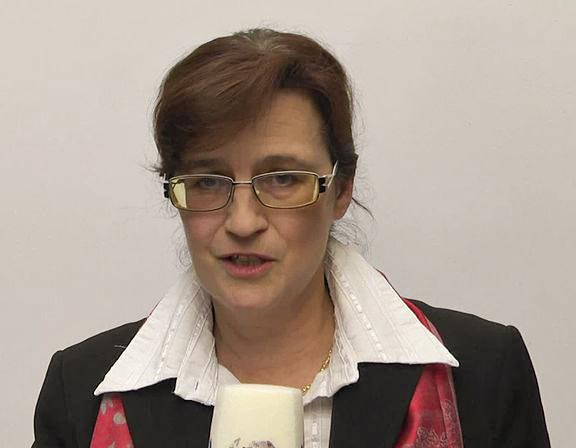

Member of the European Parliament for Czech Republic
- In office 14 July 2009 – 30 June 2014

Personal details
- Born: 11 July 1962 (age 64) Brno, Czechoslovakia
- Party: Czech Social Democratic Party
- Education: Brno University of Technology

Zuzana Brzobohatá (born 11 July 1962) is a Czech Social Democratic Party politician. She sat as a Member of the European Parliament for the Czech Republic from 2009 to 2014.

After graduating from the Brno University of Technology, Brzobohatá worked as an IT specialist and a teacher. Having been active in local and regional politics from 1998, she sat in the Chamber of Deputies of the Parliament of the Czech Republic from November 2008 until July 2009, when she took up her seat in the European Parliament.
