= Stanisław Ożóg (politician) =

Polish politician (born 1953)

member of Sejm 2005-2007
- In office 25 September 2005 – ?

Personal details
- Born: 27 May 1953 (age 72)
- Party: Law and Justice

Stanisław Ożóg (born 27 May 1953 in Sokołów Małopolski) is a Polish politician. He was elected to Sejm on 25 September 2005, getting 16922 votes in 23 Rzeszów district as a candidate from the Law and Justice list.

== See also ==
- Members of Polish Sejm 2005-2007
