= Robert Dušek =

Czech politician

Member of the European Parliament
- In office 14 July 2009 – 30 June 2014
- Constituency: Czech Republic

Personal details
- Born: 14 March 1967 (age 59) Lanškroun, Czechoslovakia
- Party: Czech Social Democratic Party
- Occupation: Politician

Robert Dušek, is a Czech politician. From 2009 to 2014 he served as a Member of the European Parliament, representing the Czech Republic for the Social Democratic Party
