= Jaromír Kohlíček =

Czech politician (1953–2020)

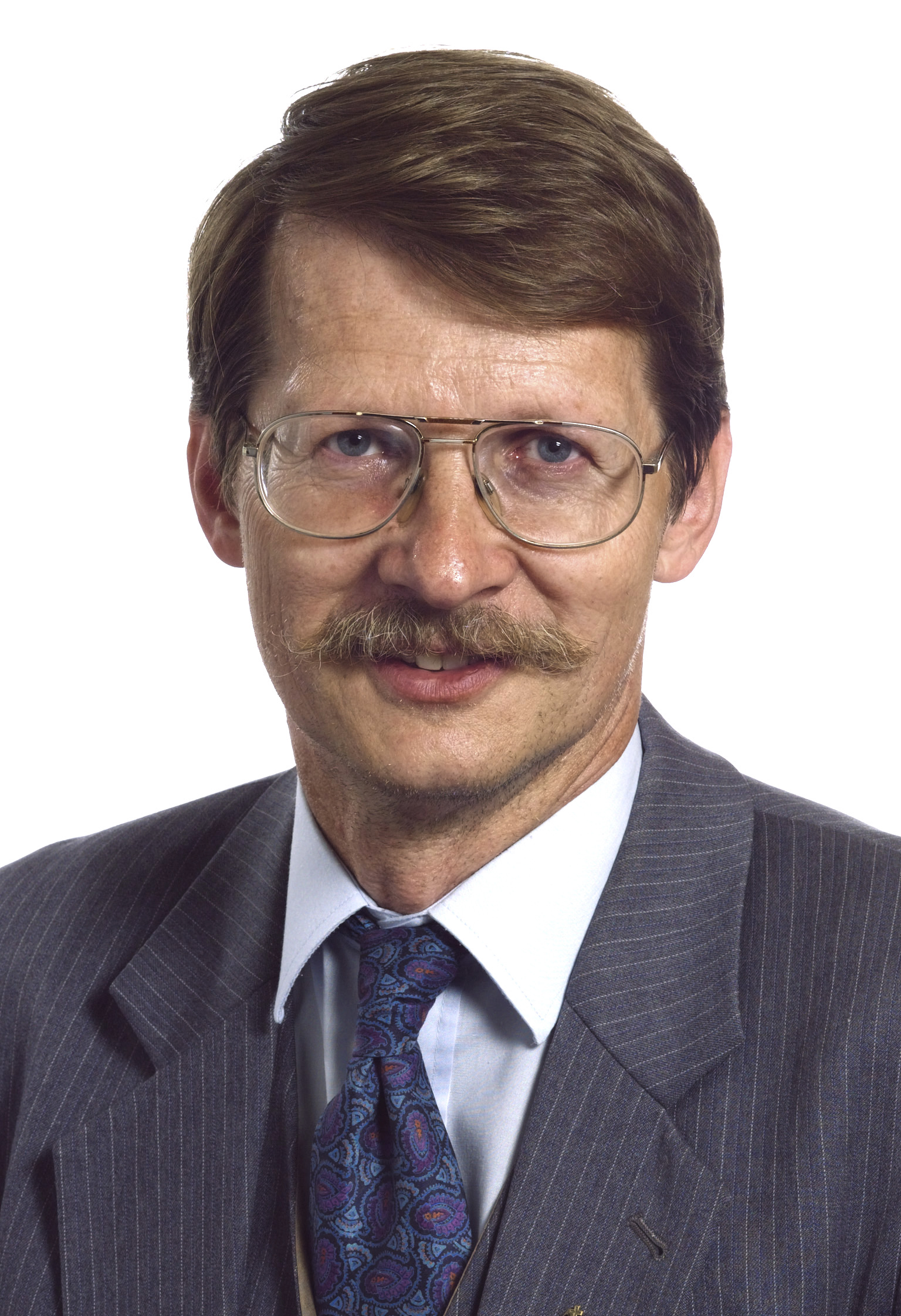

Member of the European Parliament for The Czech Republic
- In office 20 July 2004 – 30 June 2014
- In office 4 February 2016 – 1 July 2019

Member of the Chamber of Deputies
- In office 20 June 1998 – 20 July 2004

Personal details
- Born: 23 February 1953 Teplice, Czechoslovakia
- Died: 6 December 2020 (aged 67) Czech Republic
- Party: Communist Party of Czechoslovakia (1974–1990); Communist Party of Bohemia and Moravia (1990–2020)
- Education: University of Chemistry and Technology, Prague

Jaromír Kohlíček (23 February 1953 – 6 December 2020) was a Czech politician.

== Career ==
He was born in Teplice. After studies at University of Chemical Technologies he ran unsuccessfully as a candidate for the Senate. He was also member of Lower Chamber of Czech Republic Parliament (from 1998 to 2004, when he was elected to European Parliament).

Member of the European Parliament for the Communist Party of Bohemia and Moravia, a part of the European United Left–Nordic Green Left party group in the European Parliament.
