= Milan Cabrnoch =

Czech politician and pediatrician

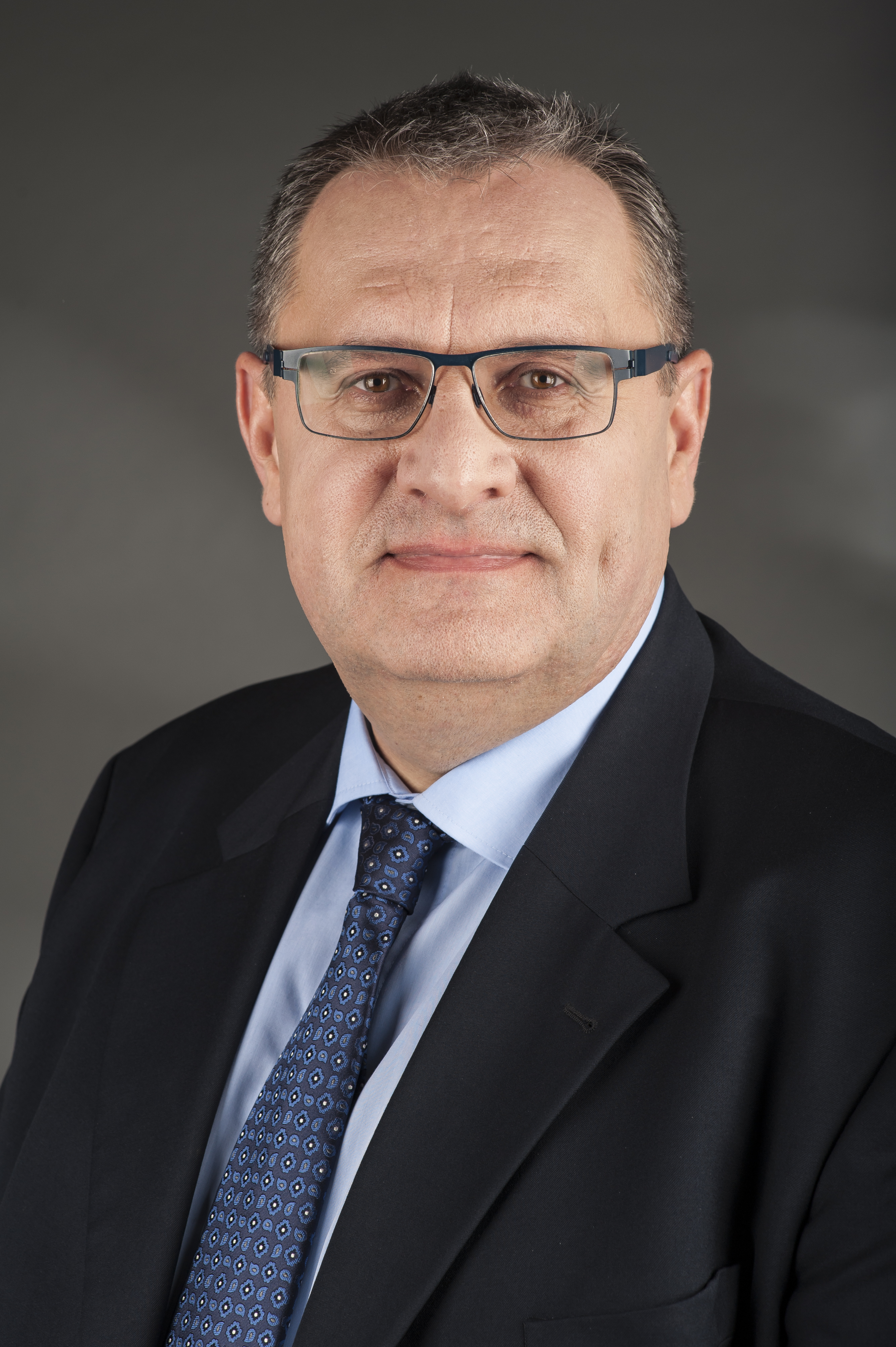
Milan Cabrnoch

Video Introduction (English) / (Czech)

Milan Cabrnoch (born 6 August 1962 in Čáslav) is a Czech politician and pediatrician. He was a Member of the European Parliament with the Civic Democratic Party, part of the European Conservatives and Reformists and sat on the European Parliament's Committee on Employment and Social Affairs.

He was a substitute for the Committee on Budgetary Control and a member of the Delegation to the EU-Russia Parliamentary Cooperation Committee.

== Education ==
- 1986: Doctor of Medicine (1st Faculty of Medicine, Charles University, Prague)

== Career ==
- 1986–1994: Medical doctor
- 1994–1998: Head of department at the Ministry of Health
- 1998: Deputy Minister of Health
- since 1995: Member of ODS (Civic Democratic Party)
- 2000–2004: Member of the ODS executive council
- 1998–2004: Member of Kolín Town Council
- 1998–2004: Member of the Chamber of Deputies of the Parliament of the Czech Republic and Vice-Chairman of the Chamber's Committee for Social Policy and Health
- Member of the Permanent Delegation of the Parliament of the Czech Republic to the Council of Europe

== See also ==
- 2004 European Parliament election in the Czech Republic
