= Olga Sehnalová =

Czech politician

Olga Sehnalová MEP
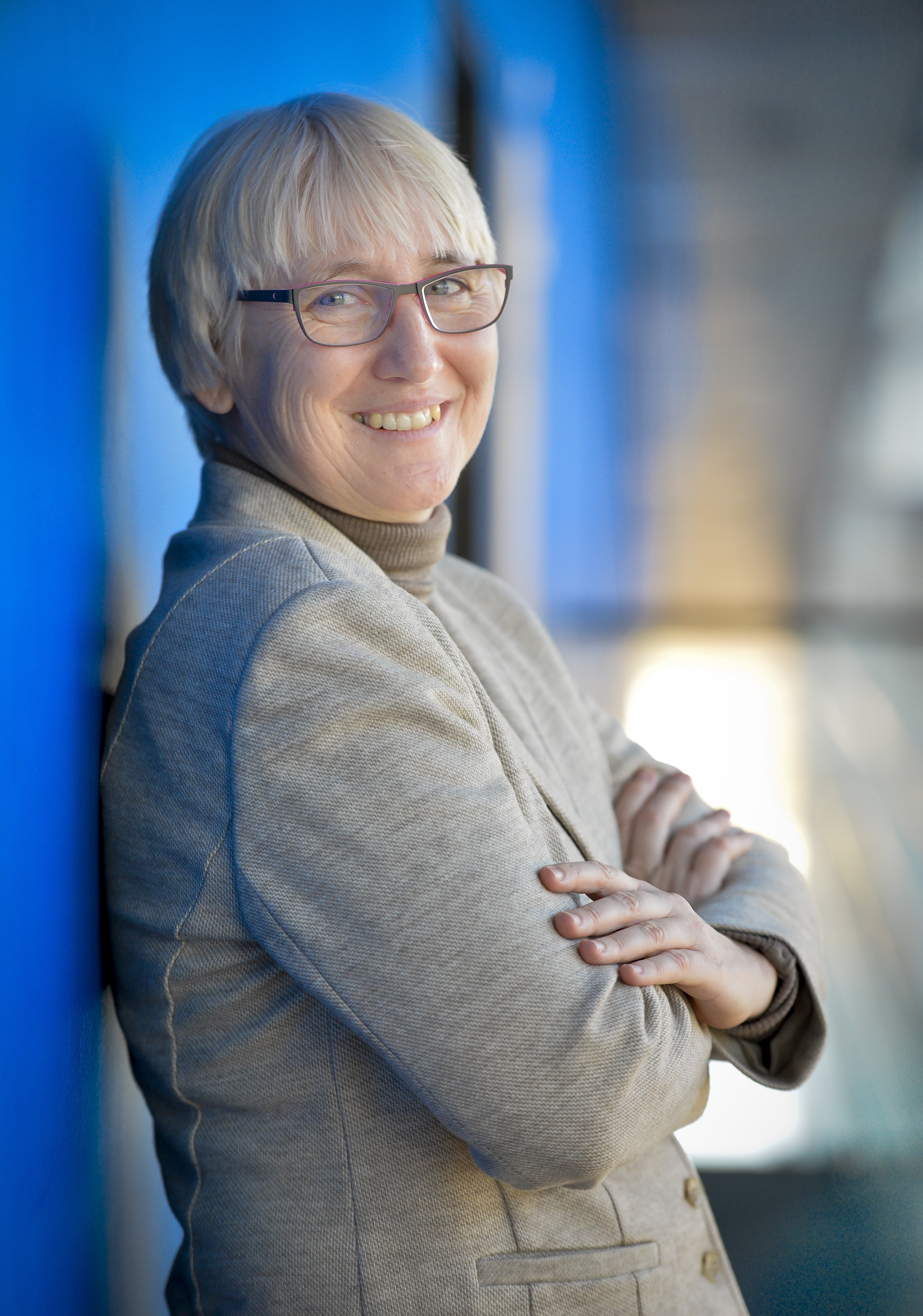
- Sehnalova in 2019

Member of the European Parliament for Czech Republic
- Incumbent
- Assumed office 14 July 2009

Personal details
- Born: 25 October 1968 (age 57) Kroměříž, Czechoslovakia
- Party: Czech Social Democratic Party
- Occupation: Politician

Olga Sehnalová (born 25 October 1968) is a Czech politician. Since July 2009, she has served as a Member of the European Parliament for the Czech Republic, representing the Social Democratic Party.

On the Committee on Transport and Tourism, Sehnalová served as the parliament's co-rapporteur (alongside Dieter-Lebrecht Koch) on the eCall initiative in 2012. In 2016, she was appointed rapporteur for the consumer protection cooperation regulation.

In addition to her committee assignments, Sehnalová is a member of the European Parliament Intergroup on Disability.

== Parliamentary service ==
- Vice-Chair, Delegation for relations with Israel (2009-)
- Member, Committee on Transport and Tourism (2009–14)
- Member, Delegation to the Parliamentary Assembly of the Union for the Mediterranean (2009–12)
- Member, Committee on the Internal Market and Consumer Protection (2014-)
- Member, Committee of Inquiry into Emission Measurements in the Automotive Sector (2016-)
