= Andrea Češková =

Czech politician

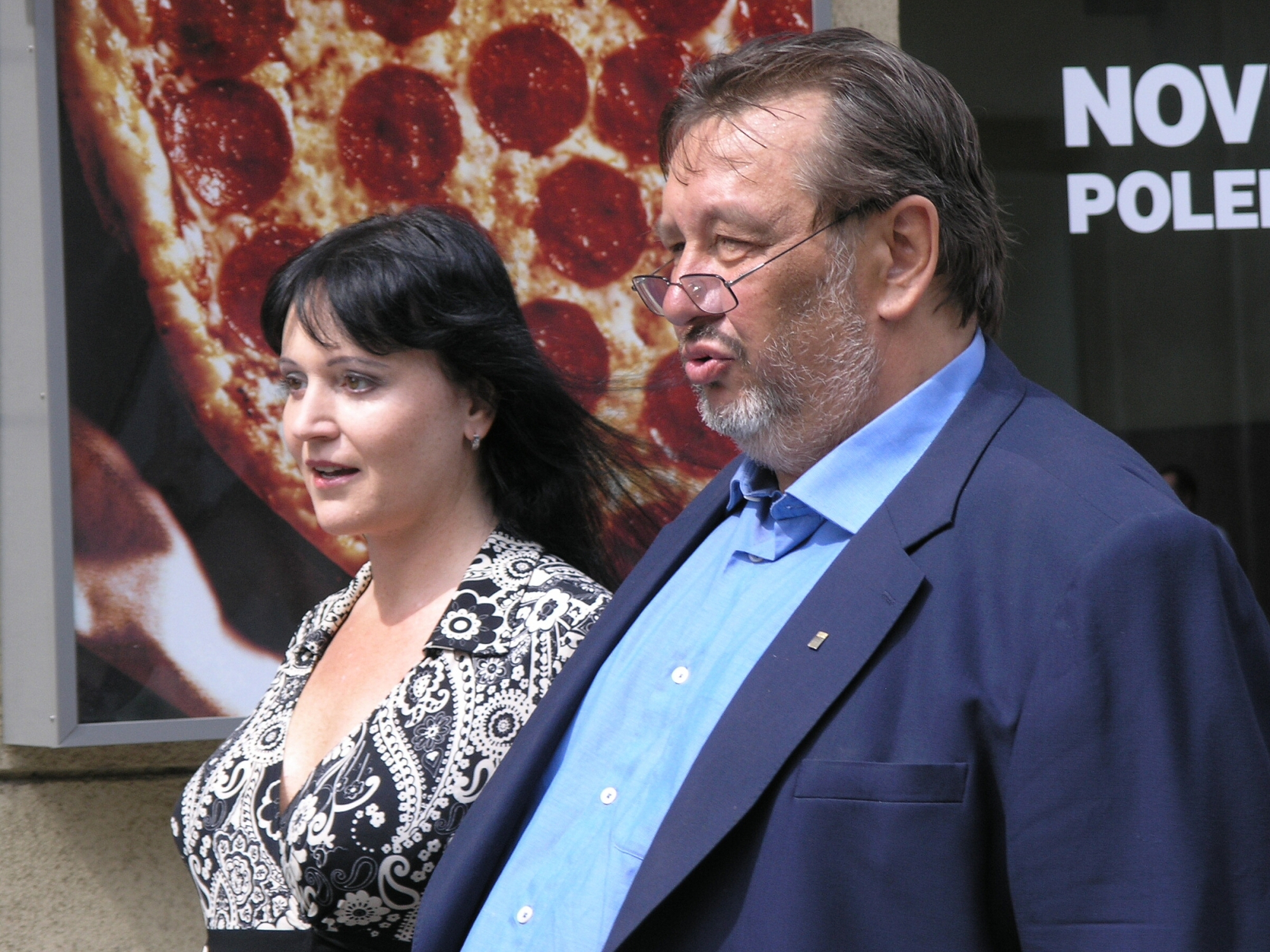
- Andrea Češková with Milan Jančík.

Member of the European Parliament for Czech Republic
- In office 14 July 2009 – 30 June 2014

Personal details
- Born: 18 October 1971 (age 54) Prague, Czech Republic
- Party: Civic Democratic Party
- Education: Charles University in Prague

Andrea Češková (born 18 October 1971) is a Czech Civic Democratic Party politician. She was a Member of the European Parliament for the Czech Republic between 2009 and 2014.

After graduating in law from Charles University in Prague, Češková served, as a councillor in Prague from 1998 to 2009, when she took up her seat in the European Parliament.
