= Hynek Fajmon =

Czech politician born 1968

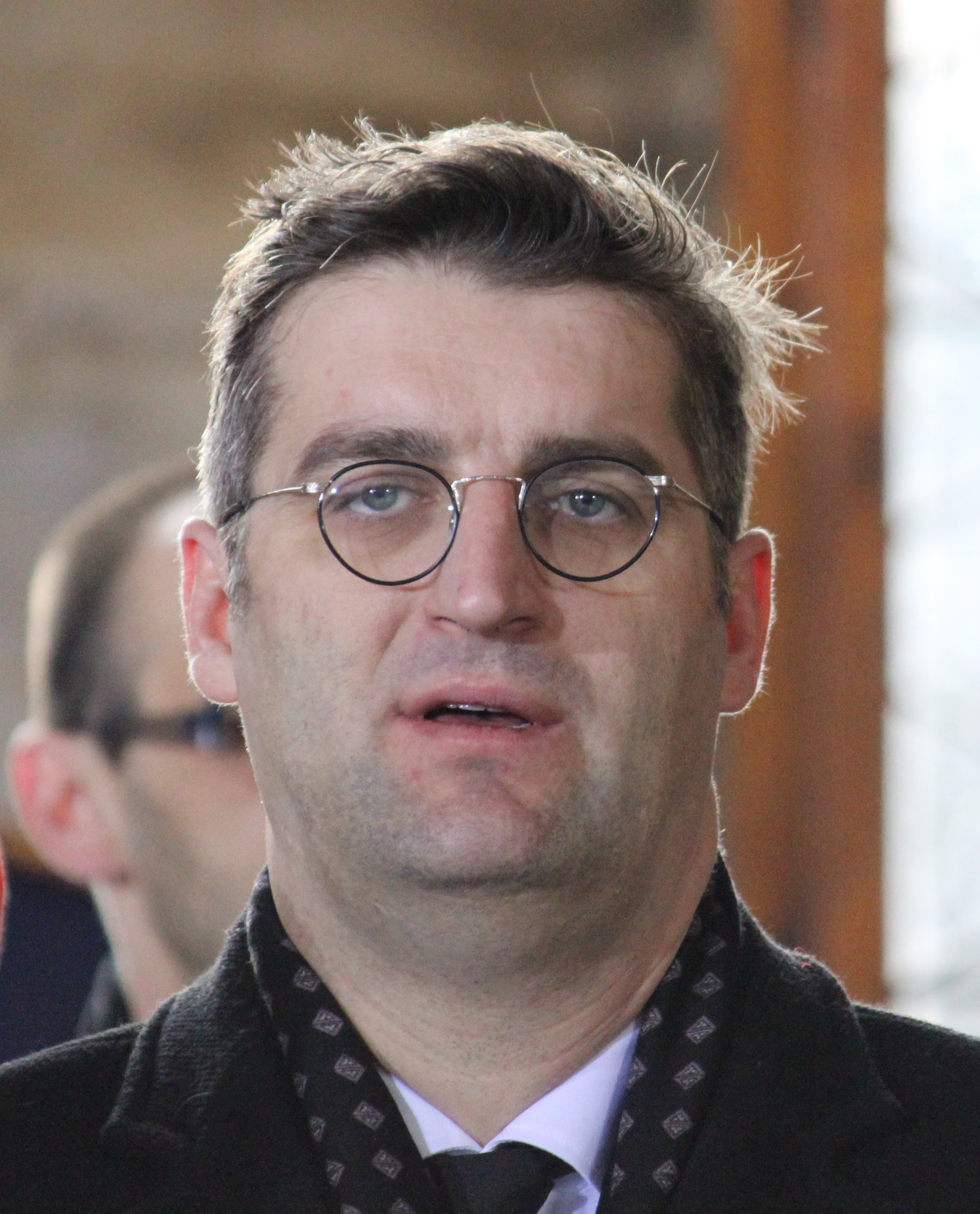
- Hynek Fajmon
- Born: 17 May 1968 (age 58); Nymburk, Czechoslovakia (now Czech Republic)
- Education: Master in history (Philosophical Faculty of Charles University of Prague) czech diplomat
- Occupation: Deputy of the Parliament of the Czech Republic
- Known for: Politics
- Title: Deputy of the Parliament of the Czech Republic
- Political party: Civic Democratic Party
- Spouse: Markéta Fajmonová
- Children: Eliška Fajmonová, Theodor Fajmon, Herbert Fajmon
- Website: http://fajmon.eu/

Hynek Fajmon (born 17 May 1968 in Nymburk) is a Czech politician who served as a Member of the European Parliament with the Civic Democratic Party between 2004 and 2014, part of the European Democrats, and s oatn the European Parliament's Committee on Budgets.

He is a substitute for the Committee on Agriculture and Rural Development, a member of the delegation for relations with the People's Republic of China, and a member of Committee on Budgets.

On 27 September 2007, he published an article expressing a favorable view of the U.S. radio detecting base, at the time a very controversial topic in the Czech Republic.

== Education ==
- 1992: Master's degree (Faculty of Philosophy and Arts, Charles University, Prague)
- Diplomatic Academy of Vienna
- London School of Economics

== Career ==
- 1994–1997: Diplomat
- 1998: Adviser on NATO affairs to the Minister of Defence
- since 1991: Member of ODS (Civic Democratic Party)
- since 2001: Member of the ODS executive council
- since 1990: Member of Lysá nad Labem Town Council
- since 1996: Member of Lysá nad Labem Town Board
- 1998–2001: Mayor of Lysá nad Labem
- 2001–2002: Deputy Mayor of Lysá nad Labem
- 2001–2004: Member of the Chamber of Deputies of the Parliament of the Czech Republic
- 2001–2004: Member of the Committee for European Integration
- 2003–2004: Observer at the European Parliament, member of the Committee on Budgets
- 2004–2014: Member of the European Parliament

== See also ==
- 2004 European Parliament election in the Czech Republic
