= Ivo Strejček =

Ivo Strejček (born 11 January 1962) is a Czech former politician and Member of the European Parliament with the Civic Democratic Party, part of the European Conservatives and Reformists. He sat on the European Parliament's Committee on Economic and Monetary Affairs.

He was a substitute for the Committee on International Trade and a member of the Delegation to the EU–Croatia Joint Parliamentary Committee.

== Early life ==
Strejček was born in Nové Město na Moravě. In 1985 he was awarded the Doctor of Pedagogy degree, and in 1994 a Master's degree, both from what is now Masaryk University, Brno.

== Career ==
- 2002–2004: teacher (1986–1996)
- 1998–2000: Owner of a small business
- since 1992: Member of ODS (Civic Democratic Party)
- 1998–2004: Chairman of the Žďár nad Sázavou local association of ODS
- since 2001: Member of the Jihlava regional council of ODS
- since 2002: Member of the ODS executive council
- 1998–2002: Member of Žďár nad Sázavou Town Council
- Member of Žďár nad Sázavou Town Board and member of Žďár nad Sázavou Town Council
- 2002–2004: Adviser to the Vice-Chairwoman of the Chamber of Deputies of the Parliament of the Czech Republic
- 1996–1997: Press spokesman of the Prime Minister of the Czech Republic
- 2002–2004: Adviser to the Vice-Chairwoman of the Chamber of Deputies of the Parliament of the Czech Republic for ODS

== See also ==
- 2004 European Parliament election in the Czech Republic
