= Miroslav Ouzký =

Czech politician

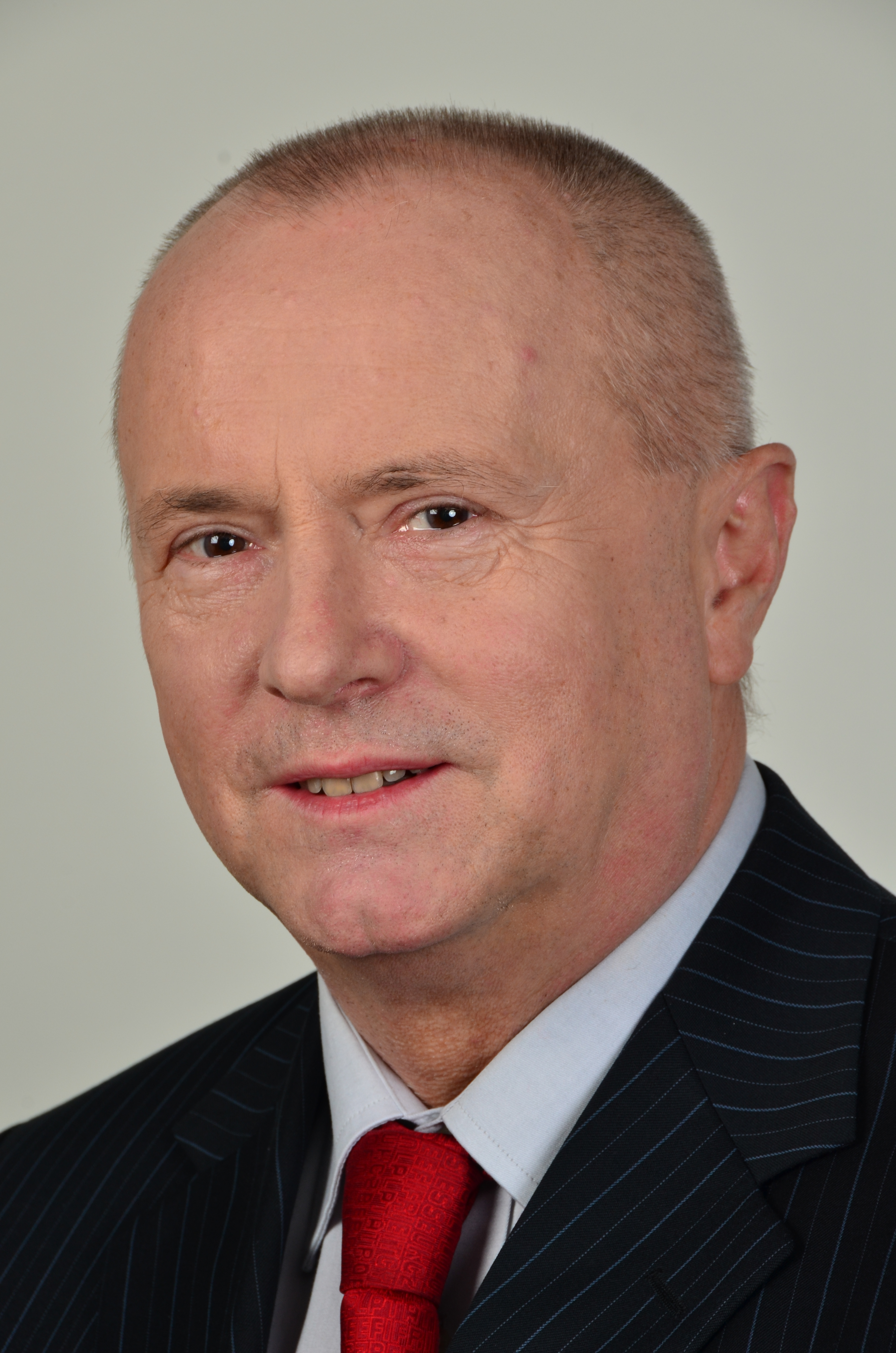
Ouzký in February 2014

Miroslav Ouzký (born 18 August 1958 in Chlumec nad Cidlinou) is a retired Czech politician and former Member of the European Parliament for the Civic Democratic Party (European Conservatives and Reformists group).

== Biography ==
He studied medicine at Charles University of Prague. He worked as a surgeon and director of a hospital in Kadaň. Thereafter, he served in a city council. In 1998 he was elected as a member of the Czech Parliament until 2004. Since then he has been a member of the European Parliament. On 20 July 2004 he was elected one of the 14 Vice-Presidents of the European Parliament. In February 2007, he became the Chair of the Environmental Committee of the European Parliament, succeeding Karl-Heinz Florenz.

He is married, and has a son and daughter.
