= Oldřich Vlasák =

Czech politician (1955–2024)

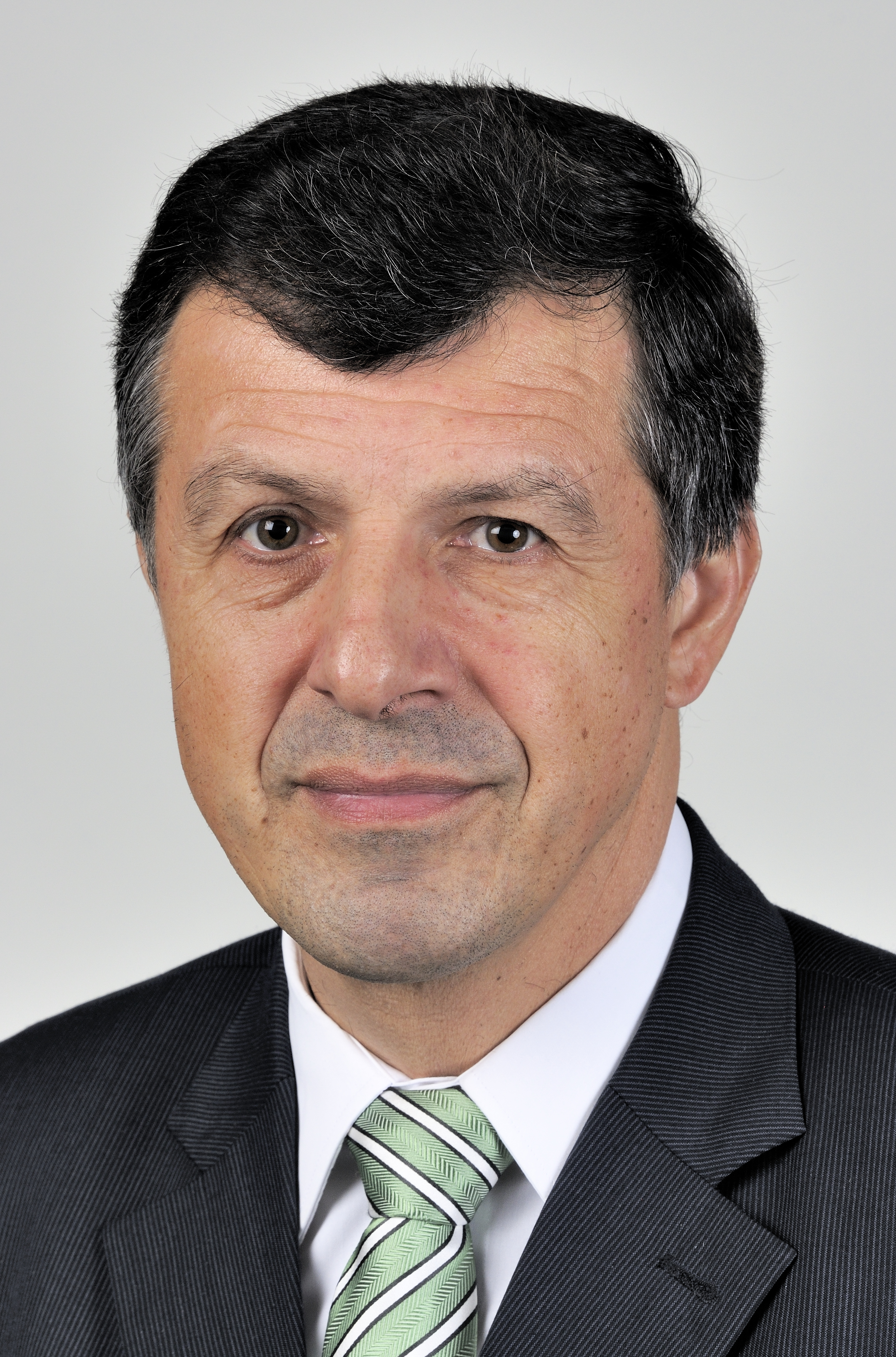
Vlasák in 2014

Oldřich Vlasák (26 November 1955 – 12 October 2024) was a Czech conservative politician for the Civic Democratic Party who served as Vice-President of the European Parliament between 2012 and 2014. He was an advocate for the interests of self-governing municipalities, cities and regions.

== Life and career ==
Vlasák was born in Hradec Králové on 26 November 1955. He studied at the Czech Technical University in Prague. After graduating he worked in science as a technical professional in the field of the environment. In his subsequent management career he worked in the private sector. He joined the Civic Democratic Party in 1991 and entered local politics in 1994, when he was elected to the Board of Representatives of the City of Hradec Králové. Between 1998 and 2004 he was the mayor of the City. In 2001 Vlasák became the president of the Union of Towns and Municipalities of the Czech Republic.

He entered European politics in 2000. He was delegated to the Congress of Local and Regional Authorities of Europe and represented the Czech Republic as an observer in the Committee of the Regions. After his work in the policy committee of the Council of European Municipalities and Regions (CEMR), he was elected its executive president. Between 2004 and 2014 he was a Member of the European Parliament (MEP). In the European Parliament he acted as coordinator of European Conservatives and Reformists in the Committee for Regional Development and was a vice-chair of the Intergroup Urban. In 2012 he became responsible for STOA in the European Parliament Bureau. He finished his term as an MEP in 2014. Vlasák died on 12 October 2024, at the age of 68.

== Publications ==
- Evropská unie očima studentů; Evropská unie očima podnikatelů; Evropská unie očima občanů ČR; 15 let ODS ve Východočeském a Královéhradeckém regionu; Budoucnost kohezní politiky; co-author of the books Evropská parlamentní demokracie, Naše obce a města v Evropské unii, Naše města a evropské peníze.
- Publisher of the INFO information bulletin. Publications to accompany exhibitions in the European Parliament: III. odboj v Československu ('The third resistance movement in Czechoslovakia') and 100 let mezinárodního ledního hokeje ('100 years of international ice hockey').
