= 2004 European Parliament election in the Czech Republic =

- 11–12 June 2004

24 seats in the European Parliament
- Turnout: 28.32%
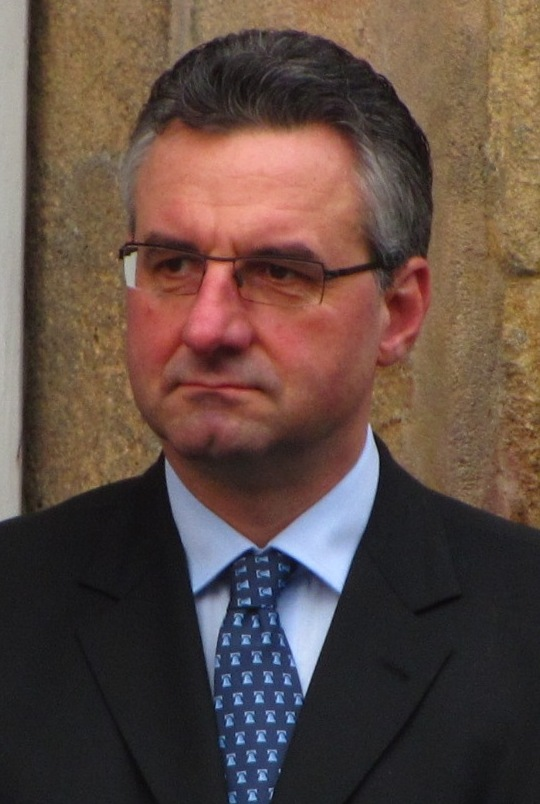

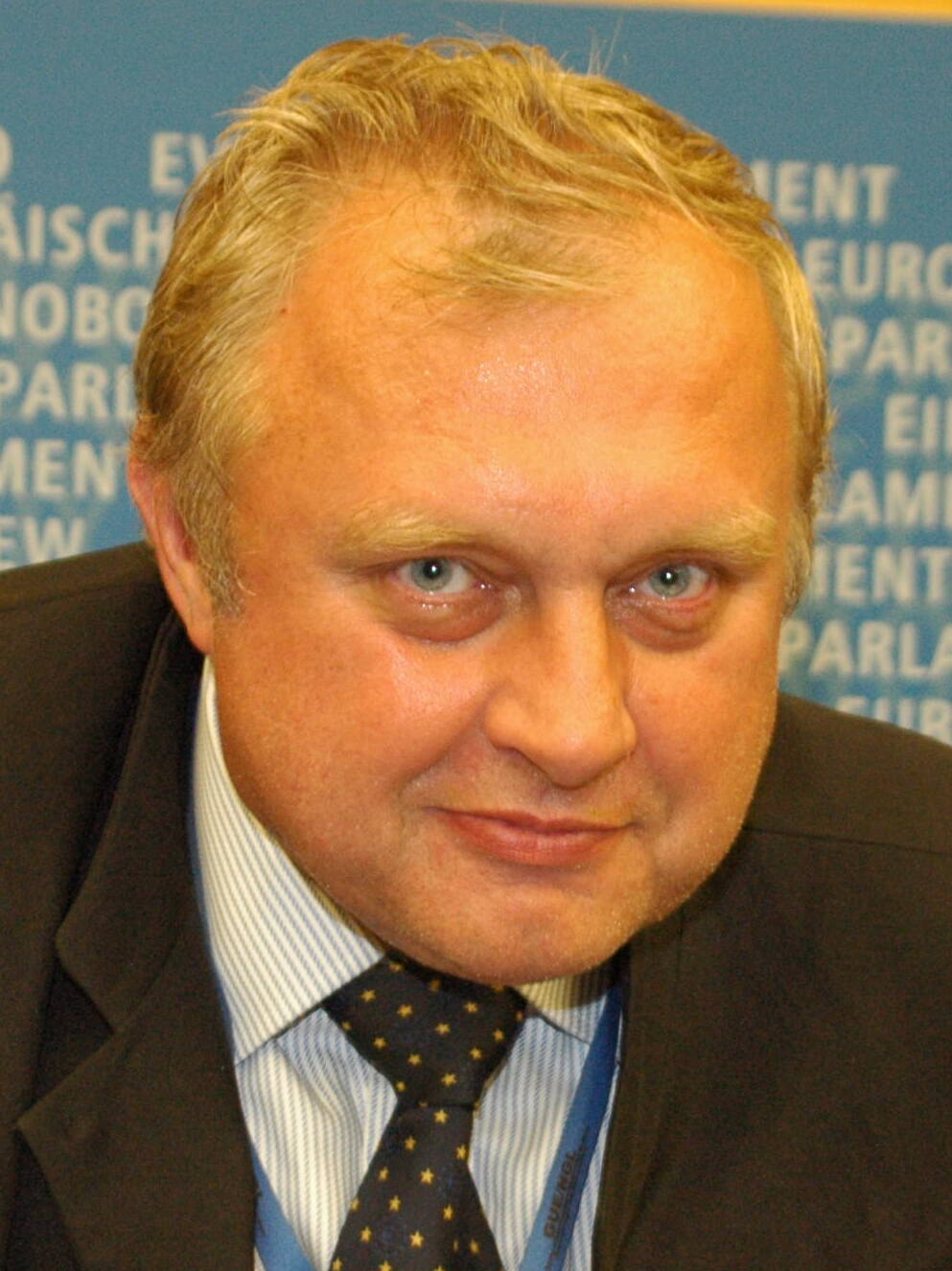

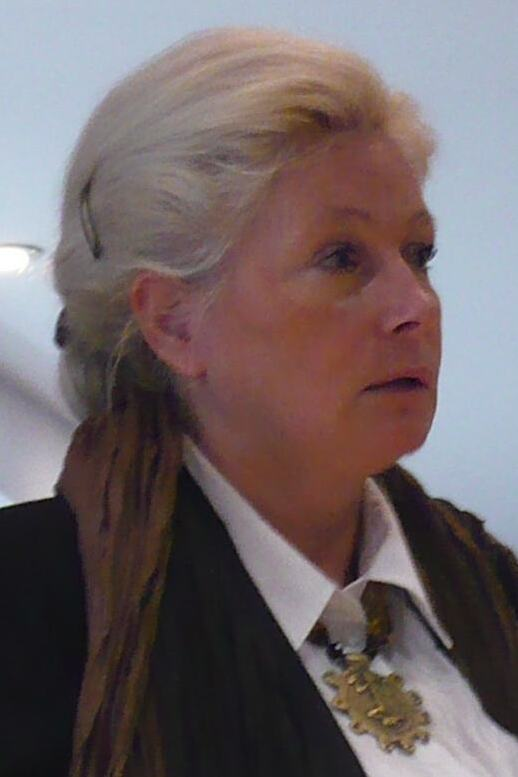

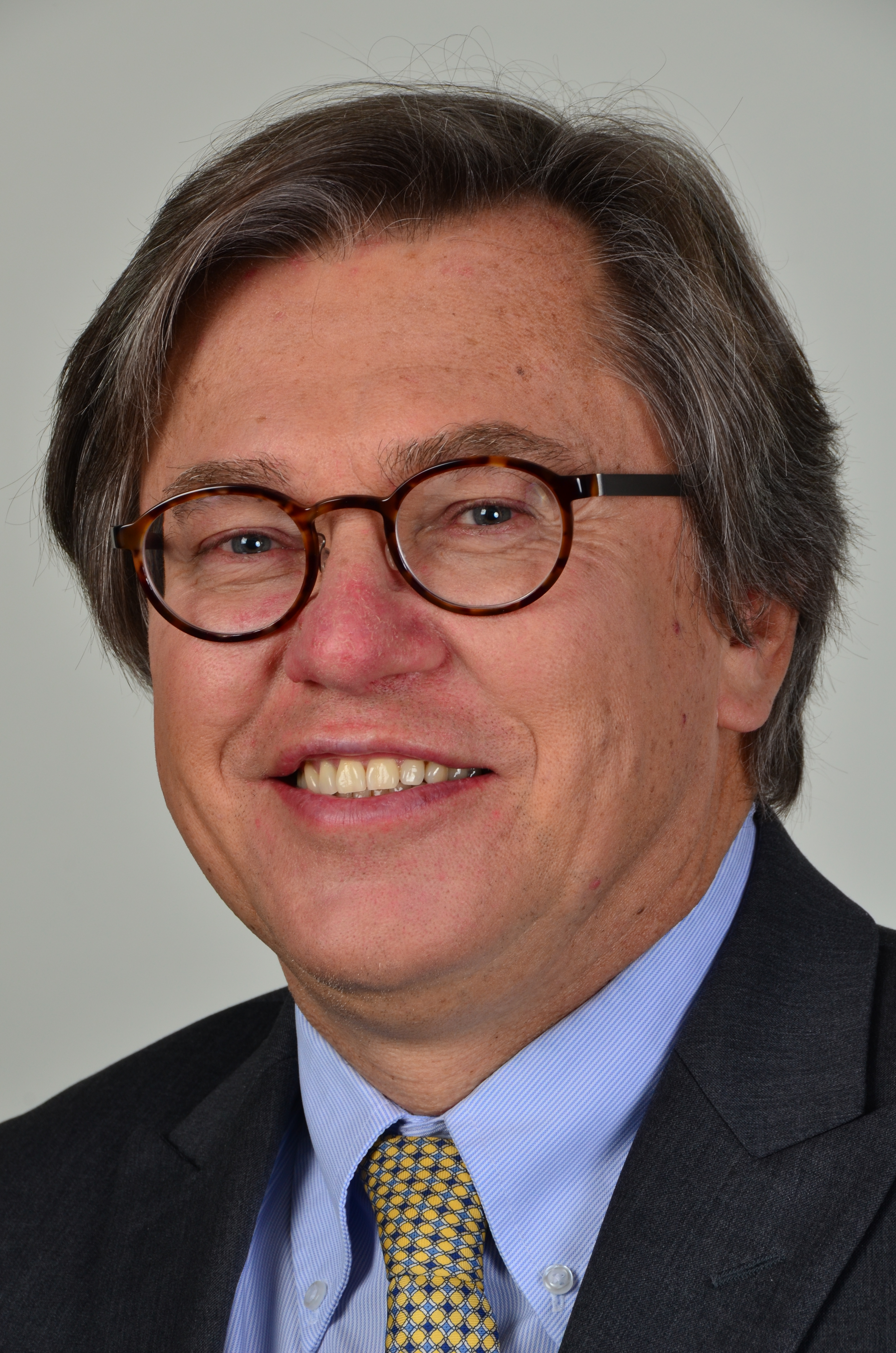

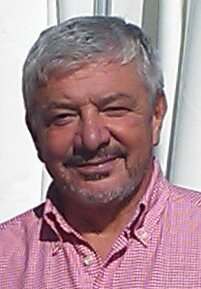
	First party	Second party	Third party
Leader	Jan Zahradil	Miloslav Ransdorf	Josef Zieleniec
Party	ODS	KSČM	SNK ED
Alliance	EPP–ED	GUE/NGL	EPP–ED
Seats won	9	6	3
Popular vote	700,942	472,862	257,278
Percentage	30.05%	20.27%	11.03%
	Fourth party	Fifth party	Sixth party
Leader	Zuzana Roithová	Libor Rouček	Vladimír Železný
Party	Christian and Democratic Union – Czechoslovak People's Party	ČSSD	NEZ
Alliance	EPP–ED	PES	IND/DEM
Seats won	2	2	2
Popular vote	223,383	204,903	191,025
Percentage	9.58%	8.78%	8.18%

The 2004 European Parliament election in the Czech Republic was the election of members of the European Parliament (MEPs) representing the Czech Republic for the 2004–2009 term of the European Parliament. It was part of the wider 2004 European election.

These were the first European elections after the country's EU accession and hence the first to be held in the Czech Republic. They took place on 11 and 12 June 2004. On a very low turnout, the ruling Czech Social Democratic Party suffered a heavy defeat, losing ground to both the conservative Civic Democratic Party and the Communist Party of Bohemia and Moravia. The debacle of his party was one of the reasons for the resignation of Prime Minister Vladimír Špidla.

== Electoral System and Voter Eligibility ==
=== Electoral System Details ===
The elections were conducted under the closed-list proportional representation system (CLPR), with the country being elected as a single constituency, with voters voting for one party or coalition of parties, and seats allocated to each party in proportion to the votes received. The CLPR system also impact on local representation and voter mobilization. Under the CLPR system, political parties pre-rank candidates on closed lists, denying voters the option to prioritize individuals. This electoral system ensures the representation of each party in the European Parliament, while also strengthening the candidate ranking mechanism within the party. This system favored larger, well-established parties, as smaller groups struggled to meet the threshold. Candidate ranking strategies have an important impact on intra-party competition and election results. Candidates with higher rankings are more likely to be elected, thus affecting the internal operation of political parties.

Eligibility and Participation

Citizenship: Czech citizens had to be at least 18 years old by election day.

Residency: Eligible voters included both residents of Czech Republic and registered Czech citizens living abroad.

Exclusions: Individuals stripped of legal capacity due to court rulings or imprisoned for serious crimes were ineligible to vote.

Approximately 8.2 million citizens were eligible to vote in the 2004 elections. However, turnout was just 28.3%.

=== Party Eligibility ===
Registration: Parties were required to submit candidate lists to the Czech Ministry of the Interior at least 66 days before the election.

Threshold: To gain representation, a party needed at least 5% of the national vote. Coalitions of two or three parties required 10%, while coalitions of four or more needed 15%.

Deposit: Each party had to pay a non-refundable fee of 20,000 CZK (approximately €650) per candidate list, which was forfeited if the party failed to win a seat.

=== Candidate Requirements ===
Age: Candidates had to be at least 21 years old.

No Dual Mandates: Sitting members of the Czech Parliament or government officials were barred from running for the European Parliament.

These regulations maintains a fair and structured electoral process, aligning with the Czech Republic's democratic commitments following its accession to the European Union in May 2004.

== Background ==
The 2004 European Parliament elections were the first European Parliament elections in which the Czech Republic participated. The elections took place on 11–12 June 2004, with results announced on 13 June after all EU states completed voting. The elections marked the first elections to the European Parliament for the Czech Republic since it joined the EU on 1 May 2004, and were an important step in the country's integration into the European political system. Czech Republic implemented reforms to align its political system with EU standards.

=== Domestic Political Landscape ===
At the time of the election, the Czech Republic was governed by a centre-left coalition led by Prime Minister Vladimír Špidla of Czech Social Democratic Party (ČSSD). The coalition ČSSD, KDU-ČSL, US-DEU) aligned Czech laws with EU standards while tackling economic stagnation and public sector reforms.

President Václav Klaus, a vocal eurosceptic from the Civic Democratic Party (ODS), held significant influence. His criticism of EU federalism contrasted sharply with the government's pro-EU agenda, creating a polarized political climate. Klaus's skepticism resonated with voters concerned about sovereignty, particularly in rural areas and among older demographics.

=== The accession profoundly influenced the EP election ===
Pro-EU campaigns: Governing parties (ČSSD, KDU-ČSL) framed the election as a step toward securing EU funds for infrastructure and agriculture.

Eurosceptic backlash: the Civic Democratic Party and smaller parties like the Communists (KSČM) warned against ceding sovereignty to Brussels, appealing to voters wary of EU regulations on farming and labor.

Shift in political discourse: EU membership forced parties to clarify their stance on integration. While ČSSD advocated deeper cooperation,ODS pushed for a "flexible Europe" prioritizing national interests.

Despite initial enthusiasm, voter turnout for the EP election was 28.3%, the lowest in the EU. Analysts attributed this to public disillusionment with both domestic politics and the perceived remoteness of EU decision-making.

== Opinion polls ==
Polling Firm	Date	ČSSD	ODS	KSČM	KDU–ČSL	ULD	SNK ED	SZ	RMS	NEZ	Others	Turnout
Election	11-12 Jun 2004	8.8	30.0	20.3	9.6	1.7	11.0	3.2	0.7	8.2	15.3	28.3
SC&C	Exit poll	10.5	31.0	17.0	8.0	2.0	10.0	4.5	1.0	8.5	17.5	29.0
STEM	1-4 Jun 2004	10.0	35.6	19.0	8.7	1.7	5.5	3.3	1.1	8.1	7.0	60.0
TNS Factum	21–26 May 2004	16.0	27.7	18.4	8.0	n/a	7.0	n/a	n/a	5.0	17.9	50.0
CVVM	19–26 May 2004	13.5	36.0	16.0	10.5	1.5	4.5	3.5	n/a	5.0	8.0	63.0
STEM	25 Apr - 3 May	14.6	35.8	15.8	7.1	1.1	3.4	4.2	n/a	5.1	12.9	43.0
SC&C	23–26 April	14.0	27.0	12.0	8.0	—N/a	9.0	3.0	—N/a	8.0	6.0	27.0
CVVM	15–22 March	14.0	32.0	14.0	7.5	1.5	—N/a	—N/a	—N/a	2.0	25.0	61.0
CVVM	12–19 January	15.0	29.0	12.5	8.0	1.5	—N/a	—N/a	—N/a	2.5	26.5	60.0

== Campaign finances ==
Party	ČSSD	ODS	ULD	KDU-ČSL	KSČM	SNK ED	SZ	NEZ	PB
Money Spent	30,000,000 Kč	30,000,000 Kč	10,000,000 Kč	10,000,000 Kč	8,000,000 Kč	8,000,000 Kč	1,500,000 Kč	1,000,000 Kč	10,000–100,000 Kč

== Campaign ==
=== Czech Social Democratic Party (ČSSD) ===
The ruling Czech Social Democratic Party campaigned on a strongly pro-European integration platform, attempting to portray EU membership as economically beneficial for the country. Their campaign prominently featured EU-funded infrastructure projects, including posters of Prague Metro expansions captioned with slogans such as "Europe's Money, Czech Roads". ČSSD also partnered with Germany's SPD to attract foreign investment, especially from Siemens, as a symbol of modernization and cross-border socialist cooperation.

The 'Tunel' scandal involving ČEZ executives particularly impacted ČSSD, leading to Justice Minister Bureš's resignation. While no other major parties were implicated in this specific case, ODS had faced earlier corruption allegations in 2002 regarding public tenders, as documented by Transparency International Czech Republic.

Internally, ČSSD was divided over how to present its EU alignment to more Eurosceptic rural populations. Some regional figures reportedly pushed for a more cautious message, warning that over-promising EU benefits could backfire, especially in agricultural regions concerned about subsidy competition.

=== Civic Democratic Party (ODS) ===
ODS' campaign emphasizes criticism of EU policies and advocates for national sovereignty, contrasting the ČSSD's pro-EU optimism. ODS organized public rallies in pubs and town squares, where party leaders criticized EU regulations and raised concerns over national traditions such as Czech beer brewing. Party leader Mirek Topolánek argued that EU integration should not come at the expense of national control. However, ODS avoided a full anti-EU stance and instead positioned itself as seeking "a pragmatic, self-respecting Czech voice in Europe".

Tensions within ODS emerged during the campaign as younger party members criticized the leadership's increasingly populist tactics. Several Prague-based candidates preferred a more moderate European message, creating a divide between urban liberal conservatives and rural traditionalists.

=== Green Party (SZ) ===
The Green Party used the 2004 election as a platform to establish its political identity. It promoted a "Green Rail Initiative," advocating for EU funds to be redirected from highway expansion to environmentally sustainable electric trains. SZ also made headlines by publishing full asset declarations of its candidates—an unprecedented act in Czech politics that gained traction among anti-corruption voters.

The party's campaign focused on university campuses, including an "Eco Debate Marathon" held at Charles University that helped register 5,000 new young voters. SZ attracted some voters who were concerned about anti-corruption by publishing candidate asset statements.

=== Czechoslovak People's Party (KDU-ČSL) ===
KDU-ČSL emphasized moral and agricultural values in its campaign, particularly in rural areas. The party distributed voting guides through Catholic churches, calling EU agricultural subsidies "a God's blessing". The party maintained a relatively low-profile media presence, relying on its church network and traditional constituencies to mobilize support. However, younger members in the party expressed frustration over the lack of a broader digital strategy, especially as SZ and ODS aggressively targeted online platforms.

=== Communist Party of Bohemia and Moravia (KSČM) ===
KSČM ran on a platform of "sovereignty and social justice," combining anti-EU rhetoric with nostalgia for the socialist era. The party accused the EU of neoliberalism and warned that Czech workers would become second-class citizens in a capitalist European order. Despite minimal campaigning, KSČM maintained steady support, especially among older voters and in industrial regions such as Northern Bohemia. Internal critics voiced concern that the party's refusal to modernize its messaging risked long-term decline, but the leadership dismissed these worries as "bourgeois revisionism."

=== Independents and Minor Parties ===
Several independent candidates and small parties attempted to capitalize on voter fatigue with mainstream options. Notably, the Independent Initiative for a Transparent Europe attracted attention for its singular focus on anti-corruption reform, though it lacked the resources for a national campaign. Turnout was notably low (28.3%), and many analysts attributed this to public confusion about the role of the European Parliament, coupled with widespread disillusionment with Czech politics following corruption scandals.

=== EU Integration vs. Sovereignty ===
The 2004 European Parliament elections in the Czech Republic was influenced by debates over the country's role in the European Union (EU). Czech Social Democratic Party (ČSSD) promoted EU integration by highlighting infrastructure projects funded by EU resources. Their campaign advertisements showcased Prague Metro expansions, captioned: "Europe's Money, Czech Roads". The Civic Democratic Party (ODS) appealed to nationalist sentiments, holding pub rallies warning that "EU regulations threaten Czech beer purity,".

=== Economic Modernization ===
ČSSD sought to bolster its pro-European stance by collaborating with Germany's Social Democratic Party (SPD) to attract Siemens investments into Czech manufacturing. The Green Party (SZ) advocated for sustainable development, proposing a "Green Rail Initiative" that prioritized EU funding for electric trains over highway expansion.

=== Anti-Corruption ===
The 'Tunel' scandal, involving allegations against ČEZ executives, led to Justice Minister Bureš's resignation and was reported to have affected public trust in mainstream political parties. This distrust amplified support for anti-corruption movements. Capitalizing on this sentiment, SZ published detailed candidate asset declarations—an unprecedented move in Czech politics—which earned them the support of younger voters.

=== Campaign Strategies ===
Political parties employed diverse mobilization strategies. The Christian and Democratic Union – Czechoslovak People's Party (KDU-ČSL) focused on rural communities, distributing voting guides through Catholic churches. SZ targeted students by organizing an "Eco Debate Marathon" at Charles University, which resulted in the registration of 5,000 first-time voters.

== Analysis ==
=== The 2004 European Parliament Election Results in the Czech Republic ===
The Civic Democratic Party (ODS) won the most seats in the Czech Republic, securing 9 out of the 24 available seats in the European Parliament. Its pro-market reforms and alignment with Western European parties solidified its dominance. The party performed particularly well in regions with conservative and economically liberal leanings like Prague and South Moravia.

Czech Social Democratic Party (ČSSD), traditionally one of the country's largest parties, finished second with 7 seats. However, its support declined by 42% compared to the 2002 national elections. Public dissatisfaction with its mishandling of pension reforms that disproportionately burdened retirees, and failure to address unemployment peaking at 9.1% in industrial regions. Voters criticized ČSSD's opaque negotiation of EU accession terms, which rural communities perceived as favoring urban elites over agricultural subsidies. Analysts attributed this to widespread voter disillusionment, internal party conflicts, and fallout from the ‘Tunel’ scandal. The low turnout also disproportionately impacted ČSSD, as its traditional voter base—particularly urban workers—was less mobilized.

The Communist Party of Bohemia and Moravia (KSČM) secured 3 seats, maintaining a strong presence in Czech politics. The Greens' 2-seat breakthrough, driven by youth-focused campaigns registering 5,000 first-time voters, signaled shifting priorities toward environmentalism.

The Green Party (SZ) gained 2 seats, marking its first significant success in a national election. The party's focus on environmental issues and sustainability attracted younger voters and those with progressive values.

The Christian and Democratic Union – Czechoslovak People's Party (KDU-ČSL) secured only 1 seat in the election.

Traditional Christian-democratic parties struggled to maintain relevance in a political climate dominated by secular priorities and EU integration debates, as evidenced by declining rural voter engagement.

=== Post-Election ===
The ODS benefited from widespread support for European integration, particularly in the context of the country's recent EU accession, the Civic Democratic Party (ODS) increased its vote share to 30.0 percent, securing 9 seats and joining the EPP–ED group in the European Parliament. ČSSD's decline stemmed from internal splits over pension reforms and perceived neglect of rural subsidies, its support collapse to 8.8 percent, triggering a 42% voter loss compared to 2002.

Small parties, particularly the Greens, capitalized on environmental concerns among younger voters, doubled its delegation by winning two seats on a platform of environmental sustainability and transparency. The election highlighted the Czech Republic's complex relationship with the European Union, where Euroscepticism coexisted with strong support for EU membership.

While the ODS and ČSSD remained dominant, the strong performance of smaller parties suggested a shift toward a more pluralistic and issue-focused political landscape, with environmental and anti-corruption themes gaining traction. The Greens, appeared well-positioned for future growth as environmental issues gained prominence in public discourse.

The Czech Statistical Office (2004) and European Parliament (2004) respectively quantified national impacts and EU-wide implications of the election." The 28.3% turnout—the EU's lowest—reflected skepticism toward EU benefits, contrasting with 45.5% average participation in Western member states. The election was a significant moment in the country's European integration process.

== Results and Aftermath ==
Party	Votes	%	Seats
Civic Democratic Party	700,942	30.05	9
Communist Party of Bohemia and Moravia	472,862	20.27	6
SNK European Democrats	257,278	11.03	3
KDU-ČSL	223,383	9.58	2
Czech Social Democratic Party	204,903	8.78	2
Independents	191,025	8.19	2
Green Party	73,932	3.17	0
Union Liberal Democrats (US–DEU+ODA+CZ+LIRA)	39,655	1.70	0
Right Bloc	27,504	1.18	0
Independent Initiative	16,762	0.72	0
Republicans of Miroslav Sládek	15,767	0.68	0
Balbín's Poetic Party	13,779	0.59	0
Party for Life Security	11,951	0.51	0
Rural Party – United Civil Forces	11,734	0.50	0
Association of Independents	11,689	0.50	0
For the Interests of Moravia in a United Europe	9,293	0.40	0
Party of Common Sense	6,316	0.27	0
Party for the Open Society	5,413	0.23	0
Conservative Party	4,986	0.21	0
Koruna Česká	4,532	0.19	0
Masaryk Democratic Party	4,366	0.19	0
Workers' Party	4,289	0.18	0
Humanist Party	3,977	0.17	0
Helax – Ostrava is Having Fun	3,366	0.14	0
National Coalition	2,944	0.13	0
Citizens' Party of the Czech Republic	2,585	0.11	0
Civic Federal Democracy	2,030	0.09	0
Labour Party	1,717	0.07	0
Party of Democratic Socialism	1,709	0.07	0
Free	1,300	0.06	0
General Civic Party	873	0.04	0
Total	2,332,862	100.00	24
Valid votes	2,332,862	99.44	
Invalid/blank votes	13,148	0.56	
Total votes	2,346,010	100.00	
Registered voters/turnout	8,283,485	28.32	
Source: Czech Statistical Office

=== European groups ===
Party	Seats
European People's Party	14
European United Left–Nordic Green Left	6
Progressive Alliance of Socialists and Democrats	2
Independence/Democracy	2
Total	24

The June 2004 European Parliament election, conducted through open-list proportional representation, saw the Eurosceptic The Civic Democratic Party (ODS) secure 9 of 24 seats with 30.04% of votes. This outcome reflected voter dissatisfaction with the ruling ČSSDcoalition, which garnered only 8.78%—its worst performance since 1996. Political analysts attributed the result to corruption scandals involving Social Democrat ministers and unpopular pension reforms.

The Communist Party (KSČM) retained its core electorate with 20.26%, while the surprise performer was the pro-European SNK European Democrats (SNK-ED), a centrist coalition capitalizing on urban professionals' demand for EU institutional transparency.

Voter turnout plummeted to 28.32%, the second-lowest in the EU after Slovakia (17%). Sociological surveys revealed stark demographic divides: 62% of university graduates voted versus 19% of manual workers, while Prague's turnout (38.7%) tripled that of rural Moravia (12.1%).

The results were a major blow to the ruling ČSSD. Following the party's poor performance, Prime Minister Vladimír Špidla faced internal criticism from senior party members and pressure from coalition partners, he eventually stepped down in mid-2004 after. This marked the beginning of a broader realignment within the Czech centre-left.

The success of the ODS strengthened its Eurosceptic platform, with party leader Mirek Topolánek declaring the results a "referendum on government arrogance and EU overreach." ODS used the momentum to bolster its position in the upcoming 2006 parliamentary elections, framing itself as the defender of Czech sovereignty within the EU.

The Green Party's entry into the European Parliament marked a turning point in Czech environmental politics, giving legitimacy to ecological and anti-corruption themes in mainstream discourse.

Turnout concerns triggered a national debate on political apathy, especially among the youth and working-class voters.

The 2004 election exposed fissures between pro-European integration forces and nationalist skepticism within the Czech political spectrum.

==== Media and Public Reaction ====
A 2004 content analysis of the Czech public broadcaster ČT and leading daily newspapers (Mladá fronta DNES, Právo) found that coverage of the European Parliament election comprised approximately 5 percent of total election reporting time, one of the lowest proportions recorded among all EU member states that year. Editorials in Mladá fronta DNES and Právo criticized both political parties and the electorate, lamenting low turnout and warning that it might undermine the legitimacy of Czech representation in Brussels.

The European Commission welcomed the Czech Republic’s first participation in a European Parliament election but expressed concern that the 28.3 percent turnout indicated many new-member voters did not yet feel the Parliament was relevant to their everyday lives. Major European papers dedicated under three percent of their Europe coverage to the Czech vote. A 2004 study of Czech Republic broadcaster ČT and leading newspapers found that coverage of the European Parliament election accounted for only about five percent of election reporting time—among the lowest in the EU. Editorials in Mladá fronta DNES and Právo lamented the low turnout and warned that such apathy could undermine the legitimacy of Czech representation in Brussels.

==== Cultural and Social Impact ====
The campaign spur cross-border discussions on environmental and anti-corruption issues. The Green Party’s “Green Rail Initiative” and its full publication of candidate asset declarations were reported by student newspapers in Warsaw and Bratislava, suggesting early signs of a shared post-accession public debate. Political scientists Štefek and Müller attribute this divide to divergent attitudes toward globalization, with urban voters emphasizing economic and mobility benefits of the EU and rural voters expressing concern about agricultural competition and national sovereignty.

The campaign spur cross-border discussions on environmental and anti-corruption issues. The Green Party’s “Green Rail Initiative” and its full publication of candidate asset declarations were reported by student newspapers in Warsaw and Bratislava, suggesting early signs of a shared post-accession public debate.
