= List of members of the European Parliament for the Czech Republic, 2024–2029 =

Members of the European Parliament for the Czech Republic
Observers	(2003)
Delegation	(2004)
6th term	(2004)
7th term	(2009)
8th term	(2014)
9th term	(2019)
10th term	(2024)

This is a list of the 22 members of the European Parliament for the Czech Republic in the 2024 to 2029 session.

These MEPs were elected at the 2024 European Parliament election in the Czech Republic.

== List ==
MEP	National party		EP Group		In office		Birth date	Notes	Ref.
MEP	Elected	Current	Initial	Current	Since	Until	Birth date	Notes	Ref.
Klára Dostálová	ANO	ANO	PfE	PfE	16 July 2024		13 March 1971	ANO 2024 list leader	
Jaroslav Bžoch	ANO	ANO	PfE	PfE	16 July 2024		30 November 1983		
Martin Hlaváček	ANO	ANO	PfE	PfE	2 July 2019	31 July 2024	14 January 1980	Resigned	
Ondřej Knotek	ANO	ANO	PfE	PfE	2 July 2019		31 August 1984		
Tomáš Kubín	ANO	ANO	PfE	PfE	1 August 2024		24 July 1962	Replaced Martin Hlaváček	
Jana Nagyová	ANO	ANO	PfE	PfE	16 July 2024		26 September 1970		
Jaroslava Pokorná Jermanová	ANO	ANO	PfE	PfE	16 July 2024		17 August 1970		
Jaroslav Knot	IND	IND	PfE	PfE	31 July 2025		20 October 1977	Replaced Ondřej Kovařík	
Ondřej Kovařík	ANO	ANO	PfE	PfE	2 July 2019	30 July 2025	21 August 1980		
Alexandr Vondra	SPOLU	ODS	ECR	ECR	2 July 2019		17 August 1961	SPOLU 2024 list leader	
Veronika Vrecionová	SPOLU	ODS	ECR	ECR	2 July 2019		8 September 1965	Chair of the Committee on Agriculture and Rural Development	
Ondřej Krutílek	SPOLU	ODS	ECR	ECR	16 July 2024		30 April 1981		
Luděk Niedermayer	SPOLU	TOP 09	EPP	EPP	1 July 2014		13 March 1966		
Ondřej Kolář	SPOLU	TOP 09	EPP	EPP	16 July 2024		13 March 1984		
Tomáš Zdechovský	SPOLU	KDU-ČSL	EPP	EPP	1 July 2014		2 November 1979		
Nikola Bartůšek	PaM (Přísaha)	IND	PfE	ECR	16 July 2024		11 May 1985	Expelled from PfE on 10 February 2026. Joined ECR on 17 June 2026.	
Antonín Staněk	PaM	AUTO	PfE	PfE	4 October 2025		2 March 1966	Replaced Filip Turek	
Kateřina Konečná	Stačilo! (KSČM)	IND	NI	PfE	1 July 2014		20 January 1981	Stačilo! 2024 list leader. Joined PfE on 21 October 2026.	
Ondřej Dostál	Stačilo! (SD-SN)	Stačilo!	NI	NI	16 July 2024		25 January 1979		
Danuše Nerudová	STAN	STAN	EPP	EPP	16 July 2024		4 January 1979	STAN 2024 list leader	
Jan Farský	STAN	STAN	EPP	EPP	16 July 2024		11 July 1979		
Markéta Gregorová	Piráti	Piráti	G/EFA	G/EFA	2 July 2019		14 January 1993		
Ivan David	SPD–T	SPD	ESN	ESN	2 July 2019		24 September 1952		

== See also ==
- List of members of the European Parliament (2024–2029)
