= List of members of the European Parliament for the Czech Republic, 2019–2024 =

Members of the European Parliament for the Czech Republic
Observers	(2003)
Delegation	(2004)
6th term	(2004)
7th term	(2009)
8th term	(2014)
9th term	(2019)
10th term	(2024)

This is a list of the 21 members of the European Parliament for the Czech Republic in the 2019 to 2024 session.

These MEPs were elected at the 2019 European Parliament election in the Czech Republic.

== List ==
On the ANO list: (Renew)

1. Dita Charanzová
2. Martina Dlabajová
3. Martin Hlaváček
4. Radka Maxová
5. Ondřej Knotek
6. Ondřej Kovařík

On the Civic Democratic Party list: (ECR)

1. Jan Zahradil
2. Alexandr Vondra
3. Evžen Tošenovský
4. Veronika Vrecionová

On the Czech Pirate Party list: (Greens-EFA)

1. Marcel Kolaja
2. Markéta Gregorová
3. Mikuláš Peksa

On the TOP 09–Mayors and Independents list: (EPP Group)

1. Luděk Niedermayer
2. Jiří Pospíšil
3. Stanislav Polčák (STAN)

On the Freedom and Direct Democracy list: (ID)

1. Hynek Blaško
2. Ivan David

On the Christian and Democratic Union - Czechoslovak People's Party list: (EPP Group)

1. Tomáš Zdechovský
2. Michaela Šojdrová

On the Communist Party of Bohemia and Moravia list: (GUE–NGL)

1. Kateřina Konečná

== See also ==
- List of members of the European Parliament, 2019–2024
