= 2024 European Parliament election in the Czech Republic =

- 7–8 June 2024

All 21 Czech seats in the European Parliament
- Opinion polls
- Turnout: 36.45% (▲7.74pp)
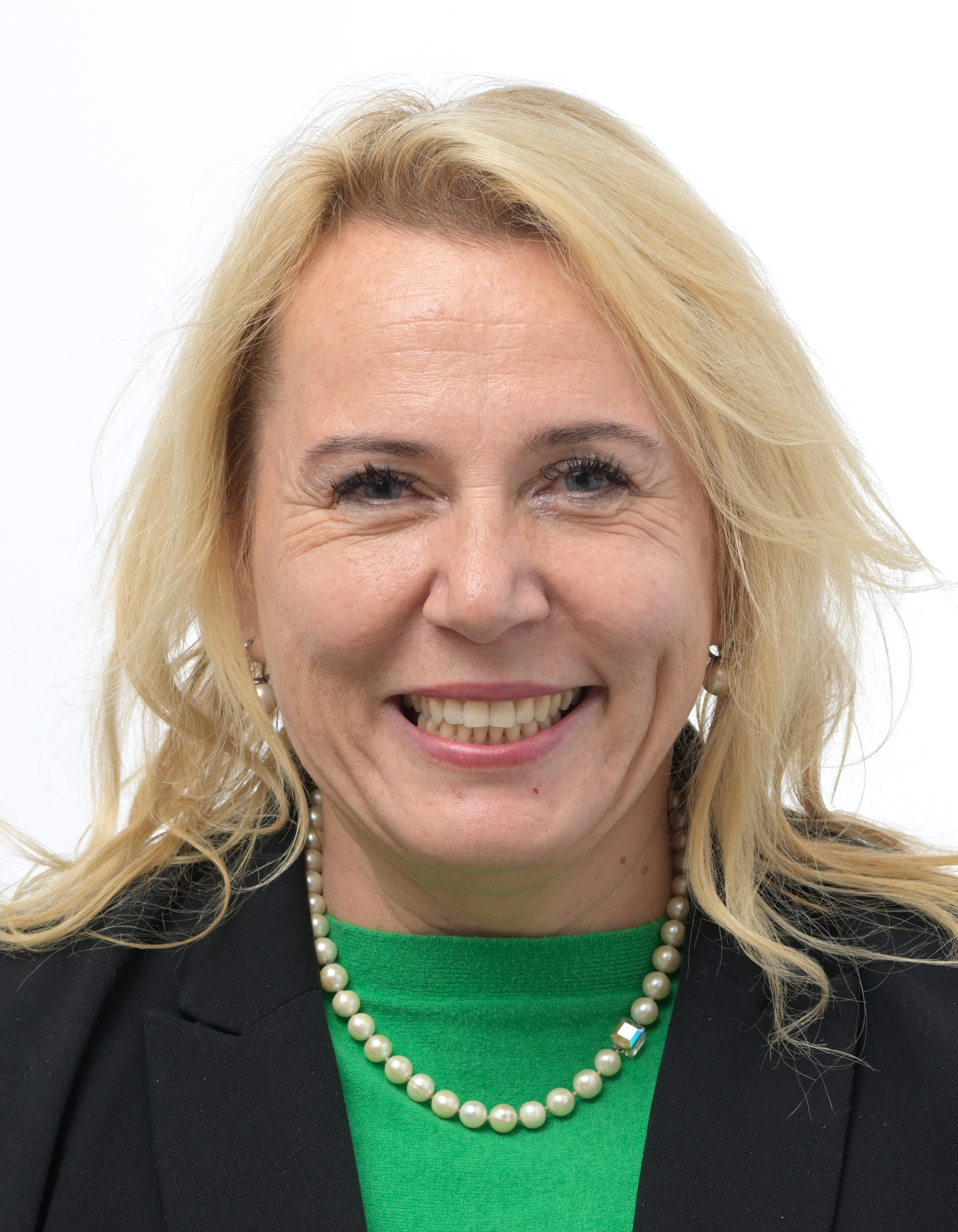

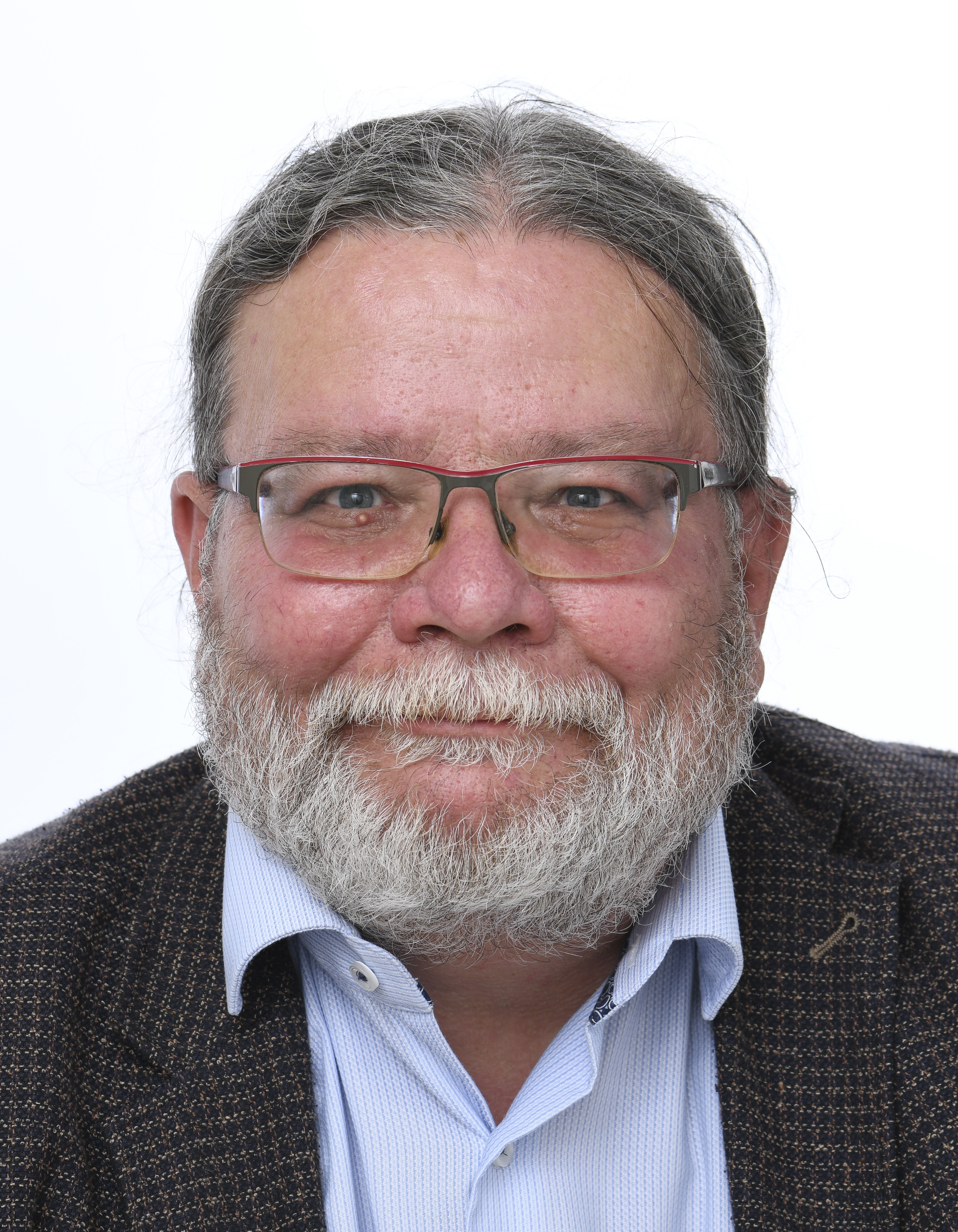

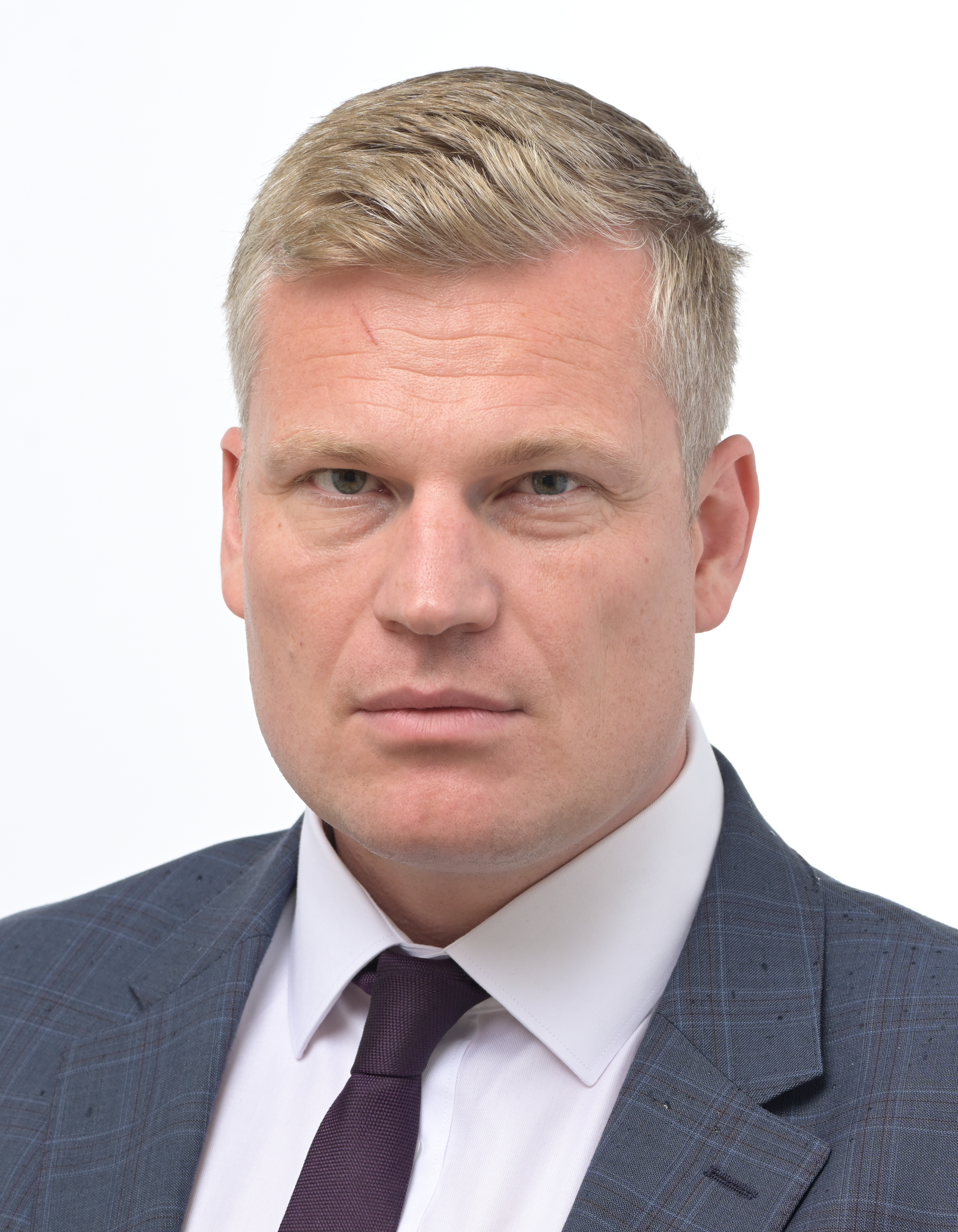

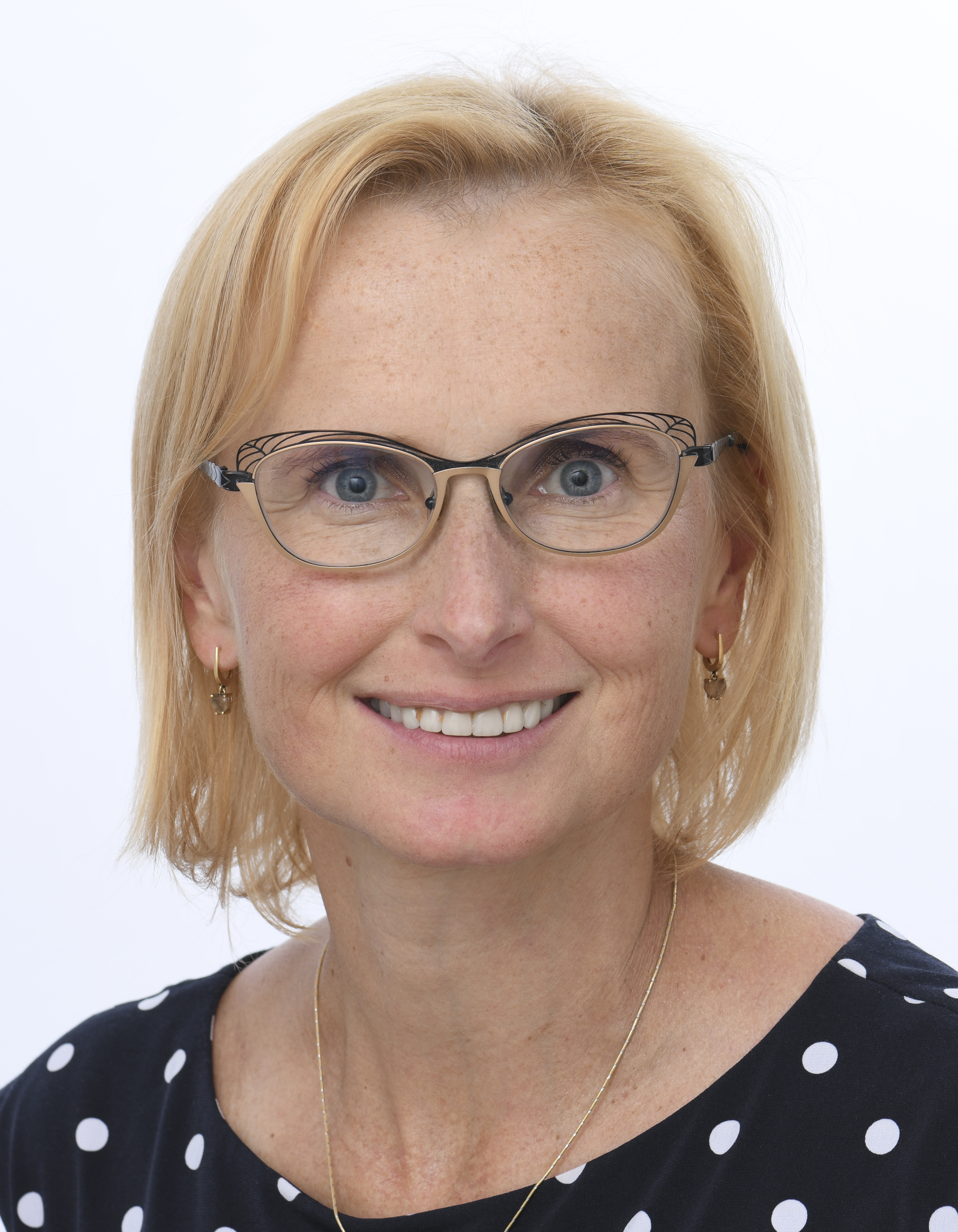

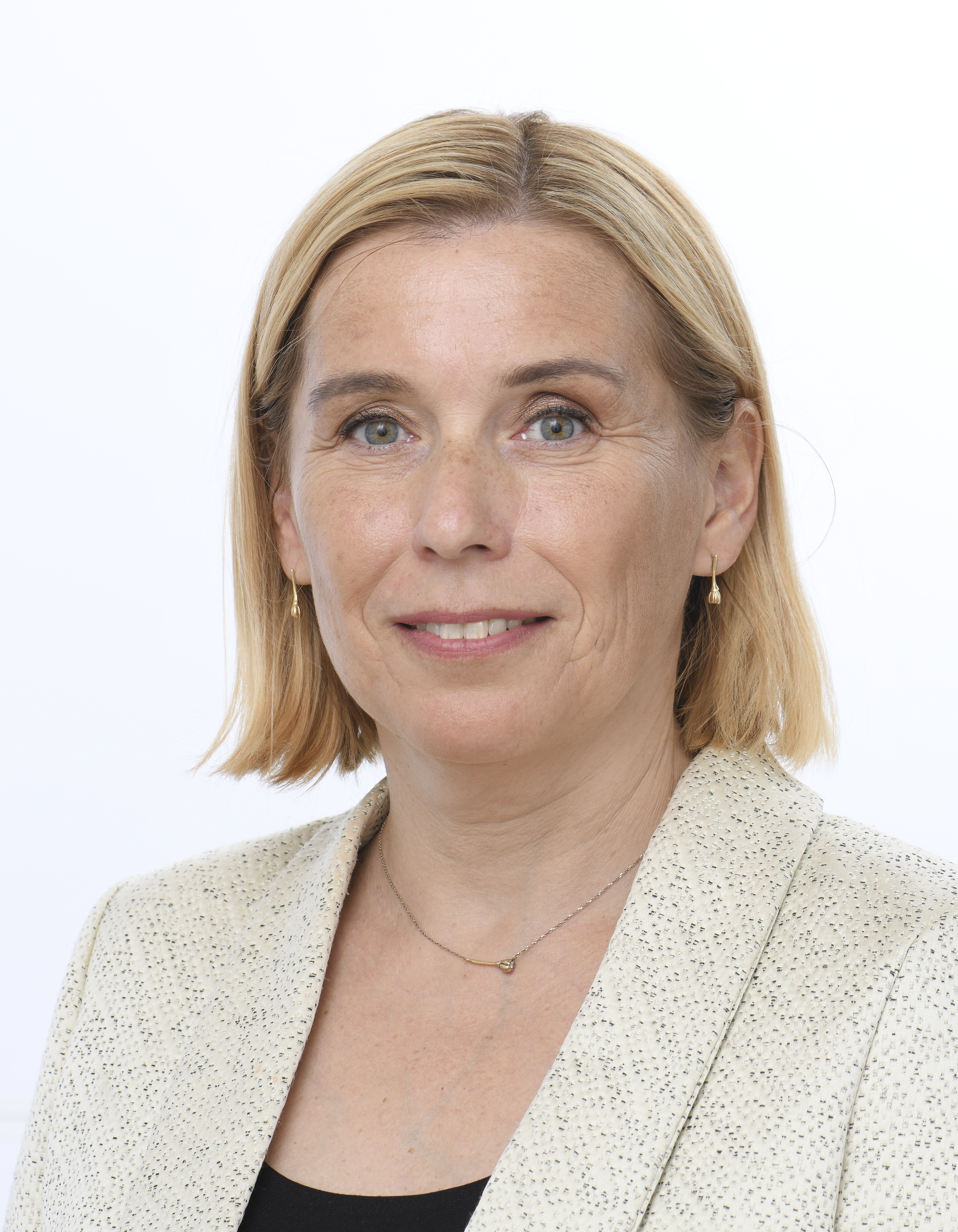

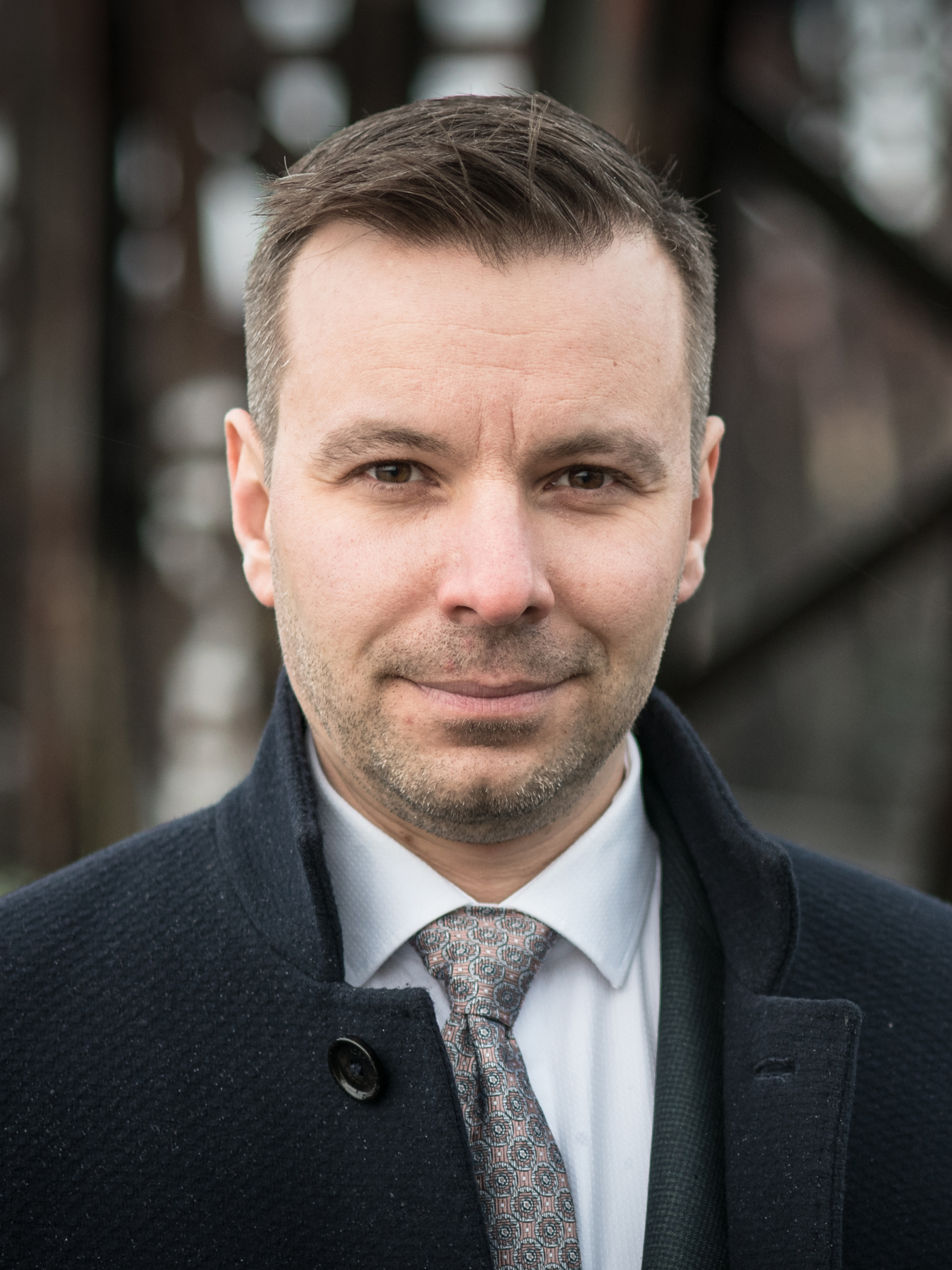

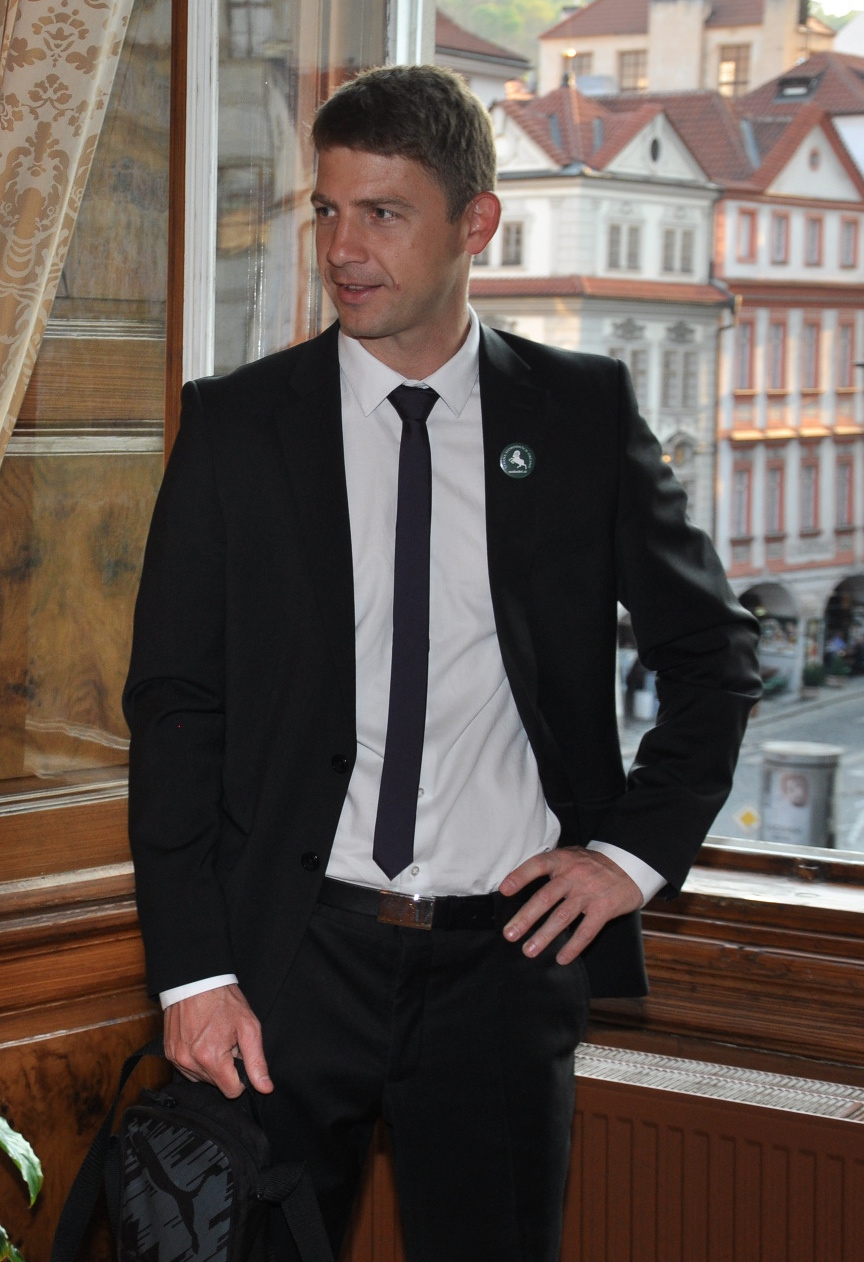
	First party	Second party	Third party
Leader	Klára Dostálová	Alexandr Vondra	Filip Turek
Party	ANO	SPOLU	Přísaha–AUTO
Alliance	RE	ECR/EPP
Last election	21.19%, 6 seats	33.44%, 8 seats (Note: Combined results of ODS and KDU-ČSL, and STAN–TOP 09 coalition)	New
Seats won	7	6	2
Seat change	▲1	▼2	New
Popular vote	776,158	661,250	304,623
Percentage	26.14%	22.27%	10.26%
Swing	▲4.95%	▲0.48%	New
	Fourth party	Fifth party	Sixth party
Leader	Kateřina Konečná	Danuše Nerudová	Marcel Kolaja
Party	Stačilo!	STAN	Pirates
Alliance	The Left	EPP	Greens/EFA
Last election	6.94%, 1 seat (Note: Result of KSČM)	11.65%, 1 seat (Note: Result of a STAN–TOP 09 coalition, and sole STAN seat within the coalition)	13.95%, 3 seats
Seats won	2	2	1
Seat change	▲1	▲1	▼2
Popular vote	283,935	258,431	184,091
Percentage	9.56%	8.70%	6.20%
Swing	▲2.62%	N/A	▼7.75%
	Seventh party
Leader	Petr Mach
Party	SPD
Alliance	ID
Last election	9.14%, 2 seats
Seats won	1
Seat change	▼1
Popular vote	170,172
Percentage	5.73%
Swing	▼3.41%

Elections were held in the Czech Republic from 7 to 8 June 2024 to elect 21 Czech representatives for the European Parliament, alongside the EU-wide 2024 European Parliament election. This was the fifth parliamentary election since the Czech Republic's EU accession in 2004, and the first to take place after Brexit.

== Electoral system ==
The 21 members were elected through semi-open list proportional representation in a single nationwide constituency with seats allocated through D'Hondt method and a 5% electoral threshold for both single parties and coalitions of two or more parties.

Both Czech and EU citizens were entitled to vote in the European election in Czech Republic provided they had a permanent or temporary residence in the country at least 45 days prior to the elections. In addition, those eligible to vote had to be 18 years old by the second election day at the latest. Voter registration was required only for non-Czech EU citizens residing in Czech Republic, while Czech citizens were automatically registered in their place of residence. Citizens abroad were not able to vote by post or in Czech diplomatic missions, but may have been eligible to vote in another EU member country.

== Background and previous election ==
The previous elections to the European Parliament were held in the Czech Republic on 24–25 May 2019. Voter turnout was 28.72%. The parties and candidates elected were:

- ANO 2011: 21.18% of votes and 6 seats (Dita Charanzová, Martina Dlabajová, Martin Hlaváček, Radka Maxová, Ondřej Knotek and Ondřej Kovařík)
- ODS: 14.54% of votes and 4 seats (Jan Zahradil, Alexandr Vondra, Evžen Tošenovský and Veronika Vrecionová)
- Pirates: 13.95% of votes and 3 seats (Marcel Kolaja, Markéta Gregorová and Mikuláš Peksa),
- STAN-TOP 09 joint list: 11.65% of votes and 3 seats (Luděk Niedermayer, Jiří Pospíšil and Stanislav Polčák),
- SPD: 9.14% of votes and 2 seats (Hynek Blaško and Ivan David),
- KDU-ČSL: 7.24% of votes and 2 seats (Tomáš Zdechovský and Michaela Šojdrová),
- KSČM: 6.94% of votes and 1 seat (Kateřina Konečná).

In October 2020, Radka Maxová resigned from ANO, and in March 2021, she started cooperating as a non-party member with the Czech Social Democratic Party (ČSSD), which had not won any seats in the previous election. In September 2022, Hynek Blaško resigned from SPD to sit in the EP as an independent.

In June 2022, the only STAN MEP, Stanislav Polčák, announced he was suspending his membership in the party, following allegations that he was a member of corruption group led by his party colleague Petr Hlubuček. A year later, Polčák resumed his membership after the Czech police decided not to charge him with any criminal offence.

== Outgoing delegation ==
The table shows the detailed composition of the Czech seats at the European Parliament as of 25 January 2024.

EP Group	Seats	Party	Seats	MEPs
Renew Europe	5 / 21	ANO 2011	3	Martin Hlaváček; Ondřej Knotek; Ondřej Kovařík
Renew Europe	5 / 21	Independents	2	Dita Charanzová; Martina Dlabajová
European People's Party	5 / 21	TOP 09	2	Luděk Niedermayer; Jiří Pospíšil
European People's Party	5 / 21	KDU-ČSL	2	Michaela Šojdrová; Tomáš Zdechovský
European People's Party	5 / 21	Mayors and Independents	1	Stanislav Polčák
European Conservatives and Reformists	4 / 21	Civic Democratic Party	4	Evžen Tošenovský; Alexandr Vondra; Veronika Vrecionová; Jan Zahradil
Greens–European Free Alliance	3 / 21	Czech Pirate Party	3	Markéta Gregorová; Marcel Kolaja; Mikuláš Peksa
Progressive Alliance of Socialists and Democrats	1 / 21	Independents	1	Radka Maxová
Identity and Democracy	1 / 21	Freedom and Direct Democracy	1	Ivan David
The Left in the European Parliament – GUE/NGL	1 / 21	Communist Party of Bohemia and Moravia	1	Kateřina Konečná
Non-Inscrits	1 / 21	Independents	1	Hynek Blaško
Total			21	
Source: European Parliament

== Running parties ==
The following parties and coalitions running in the European elections were represented in the Chamber of Deputies or in the European Parliament at the time of the election:

Party		Main ideology	Leader(s)	European party	EP Group	2019 result		Outgoing MEPs
Party		Main ideology	Leader(s)	European party	EP Group	Votes (%)	Seats	Outgoing MEPs
SPOLU	Together Spolu: Civic Democratic Party; TOP 09; KDU-ČSL	Liberal conservatism	Alexandr Vondra	ECR; EPP	ECR; EPP	33.44% (Note: ODS + TOP 09 + KDU-ČSL + STAN)	8 / 21	8 / 21
ANO	ANO 2011; ANO 2011	Right-wing populism	Klára Dostálová	ALDE	RE	21.19%	6 / 21	3 / 21
Piráti	Czech Pirate Party; Česká pirátská strana	Pirate politics	Marcel Kolaja	PPEU	Greens/EFA	13.96%	3 / 21	3 / 21
STAN	Mayors and Personalities for Europe Starostové a osobnosti pro Evropu: Mayors and Independents; Mayors for Liberec Region	Liberalism	Danuše Nerudová	None	EPP	11.65% (Note: with TOP 09)	1 / 21	1 / 21
SPD and Trikolóra	SPD and Tricolour SPD a Trikolóra: Freedom and Direct Democracy; Tricolour Citizens' Movement	Right-wing populism	Petr Mach	ID Party	ID	9.14% (Note: only SPD)	2 / 21	1 / 21
Enough!	Enough! Stačilo!: Communist Party of Bohemia and Moravia; United Democrats – Association of Independents; Czech National Social Party	Left-wing nationalism	Kateřina Konečná	PEL	The Left	6.94% (Note: only KSČM)	1 / 21	1 / 21
ZNČR Alliance	Alliance for the Independence of the Czech Republic Aliance pro nezávislost ČR: National Democracy; Alliance of National Forces; Party of Common Sense; Workers' Party of Social Justice; Rally for the Republic – Republican Party of Czechoslovakia; Safe Streets	Ultranationalism	Hynek Blaško	None	NI	1.23%	0 / 21	1 / 21

The following parties and coalitions announced submitted their candidacy, were not represented in the Chamber of Deputies nor in the European Parliament at the time of the election, but appeared at least one relevant opinion poll:

Party		Main ideology	Leader(s)	European party	EP Group	2019 result		Outgoing MEPs
Party		Main ideology	Leader(s)	European party	EP Group	Votes (%)	Seats	Outgoing MEPs
SOCDEM	Social Democracy; Sociální demokracie	Social democracy	Lubomír Zaorálek	PES	S&D	3.95%	0 / 21	0 / 21
Svobodní	Svobodní	Libertarian conservatism	Libor Vondráček	None	None	0.65%	0 / 21	0 / 21
PRO 2022	Law, Respect, Expertise Právo Respekt Odbornost: Law, Respect, Expertise; Right Choice for Health and Sport	Right-wing populism	Jindřich Rajchl	None	None	did not exist	0 / 21	0 / 21
Přísaha and Motorists	Přísaha and Motorists Přísaha a Motoristé: Přísaha; Motorists for Themselves	Right-wing populism	Filip Turek	None	None	did not exist	0 / 21	0 / 21
Greens	Green Party; Strana zelených	Green politics	Johanna Nejedlová	EGP	Greens/EFA	did not run (Note: supported TOP 09)	0 / 21	0 / 21

The following parties and coalitions were not represented in the Chamber of Deputies or the European Parliament at the time of the election and did not appear in any relevant opinion poll:

Party		Main ideology	Leader(s)	European party	EP Group	2019 result		Outgoing MEPs
Party		Main ideology	Leader(s)	European party	EP Group	Votes (%)	Seats	Outgoing MEPs
ČR1	Czech Republic on the 1st place! Česká republika na 1. místě!	Vaccine hesitancy	Ladislav Vrabel	None	None	did not exist	0 / 21	0 / 21
ČSSD	Czech Sovereignty of Social Democracy Česká suverenita sociální demokracie: Czech Sovereignty of Social Democracy; Direction Czech Republic; HOME	Left-wing nationalism	Jiří Paroubek	None	None	0.11%	0 / 21	0 / 21
DSZ - ZA PRÁVA ZVÍŘAT	Democratic Party of Greens – For Animal Rights; Demokratická strana zelených – Za práva zvířat	Green politics	Hana Janišová	None	None	0.60%	0 / 21	0 / 21
Voice	Voice; Hlas	Liberalism	Milan Hamerský	None	RE	2.38%	0 / 21	0 / 21
KAN	Club of Committed Non-Party Members; Klub angažovaných nestraníků	Liberal conservatism	Stanislav Pochman	None	None	0.10%	0 / 21	0 / 21
LANO	Liberal Alliance of Independent Citizens; Liberální aliance nezávislých občanů	Liberalism	Šimon Hlinovský	None	None	did not exist	0 / 21	0 / 21
Better Life for the People	Better Life for the People; Lepší život pro lidi	Populism	Pavel Opl	None	None	did not run	0 / 21	0 / 21
The Left	The Left; Levice	Democratic socialism	Jan Májíček	PEL	GUE/NGL	did not run	0 / 21	0 / 21
aliens.eu	Better EU with Alliens; Lepší EU s mimozemšťany	Political satire	Tomáš Franěk	None	None	did not exist	0 / 21	0 / 21
Mourek	Tabby Cat; Mourek	Liberalism	Jan Červenka	None	None	did not exist	0 / 21	0 / 21
NOS	New Direction; Nový směr	Internet access expansion	Zbyněk Hromek	None	None	did no exist	0 / 21	0 / 21
PB	Right Bloc; Pravý blok	Right-wing populism	Petr Cibulka	None	None	0.20%	0 / 21	0 / 21
FOR CZEXIT	FOR CZEXIT PRO vystoupení z EU: Moravané; Rally for the Republic – Republican Party of Bohemia, Moravia and Silesia	Euroscepticism	Ctirad Musil	None	None	0.27% (Note: only Moravané)	0 / 21	0 / 21
REFERENDUM	Referendum – Voice of the People; REFERENDUM - Hlas lidu	Direct democracy	Václav Sogel	None	None	did not exist	0 / 21	0 / 21
SEN 21 and Volt	SEN 21 and Volt SEN21 a Volt: SEN 21; Volt Czechia	European federalism	Lenka Helena Koenigsmark	EDP; Volt	RE Greens/EFA	did not exist	0 / 21	0 / 21
SESO	Seniors for Themselves; Senioři sobě	Pensioners' interests	Jaroslav Pollák	None	None	did not exist	0 / 21	0 / 21
ŠD and SSPD-SP	ŠD and SSPD-SP ŠD a SSPD-SP: Swiss Democracy; Party of the State of Direct Democracy – Party of Labor	Swiss system	Pynelopi Cimprichová	None	None	did not exist	0 / 21	0 / 21
URZA	Urza.cz	Anarcho-capitalism	Martin Urza	None	None	did not run	0 / 21	0 / 21

== Background ==
=== SPOLU ===
The Civic Democratic Party (ODS), KDU-ČSL and TOP 09 discussed whether they would run under the combined SPOLU banner or independently. According to reports, the ODS and TOP 09 memberships preferred to run independently, while ODS leader and Czech Prime Minister Petr Fiala favoured a joint candidacy as SPOLU. A combined list under the SPOLU banner was problematic due to the fact that ODS was part of the European Conservatives and Reformists EP grouping, while KDU-ČSL and TOP 09 were part of the European People's Party. Sitting MEP and ODS' 2019 electoral leader Jan Zahradil was reported to be problematic for KDU-ČSL and TOP 09, as well as many ODS members such as MP Eva Decroix. On 5 June 2023, Zahradil announced that he would not run in the election. Alexandr Vondra was also speculated as a potential lead candidate for ODS or SPOLU.

On 18 May 2023, members of KDU-ČSL voted in a membership referendum in favor of running independently. On 20 May 2023, KDU-ČSL decided at its nomination conference that its lead candidate for the 2024 elections would be sitting MEP Tomáš Zdechovský. Other candidates would include: František Talíř, the 1st Deputy Governor of the South Bohemian Region; MEP Michaela Šojdrová; Ondřej Mikmek, mayor of Slatinice in Olomouc; senator and twice presidential candidate Pavel Fischer; and MP Hayato Okamura. A decision over whether KDU-ČSL would run independently or as part of the SPOLU alliance was scheduled for September 2023.

On 30 October 2023, ODS, TOP 09 and KDU-ČSL announced that they would contest the election on a joint list.

=== Czech Pirate Party ===
The Czech Pirate Party launched primaries for its election list on 30 May 2023. All incumbent MEPs (Mikuláš Peksa, Markéta Gregorová and Marcel Kolaja) announced their intention to run for the position of electoral leader. Former MP Mikuláš Ferjenčík also announced his candidacy, and received the endorsements of Minister of Foreign Affairs Jan Lipavský and former Mayor of Prague Zdeněk Hřib. 2019 electoral leader Marcel Kolaja soon criticised Ferjenčík, stating that the leader should be a respected politician. The fifth candidate was Jana Kolaříková, chair of the South Bohemian branch of the party.

=== ANO ===
MP and former government minister Klára Dostálová was speculated to become the lead candidate for ANO 2011. 2019 electoral leader Dita Charanzová was reportedly undecided whether to run again. Party leader Andrej Babiš was also reported to be considering his own candidacy.

=== STAN ===
Leader of Mayors and Independents (STAN) Vít Rakušan suggested Jan Farský as his party's electoral leader.

=== ČSSD ===
Former Czech Prime Minister Jiří Paroubek announced his intention to run in the election with his Nespokojení (Dissatisfied) movement, with the aim of connecting parties on the left of the political spectrum.

=== SEN21+Volt ===
In October 2023, Volt and SEN21 announced that they would be standing in the European elections on a joint list. The head of their joint list was Lenka Koenigsmark.

=== PRO 2022 ===
On 8 April 2024, ice hockey coach and former professional player Vladimír Růžička announced his candidacy for PRO 2022.

== Campaign ==
The official campaign began on 26 January 2024, when Czech president Petr Pavel announced the official date of the election. From that date, no party or coalition could spend more than 50 million crowns on campaign promotion, and they had to create a transparent bank account within five days.

=== Parties ===
==== ANO ====
ANO 2011 started its campaign in Zlín, where party leader Andrej Babiš and election list lead candidate Klára Dostálová presented the party's priorities: Czech sovereignty, European self-reliance, and cutting back the European Green Deal. The party also said it wanted to curb illegal immigration, lessen the EU's impact on daily life, and oppose the adoption of the Euro. ANO stated that its goal was to win at least six seats.

The party announced its slogan as "Česko, pro tebe všecko" (English: "Czechia, everything for you"), accompanied by pictures of Babiš and Dostálová with Czech flags painted on their cheeks. ODS bought the web domain of the slogan, and posted there a manipulated version of the graphic, featuring the slogan changed to "Rusko, pro tebe všecko” (English: "Russia, everything for you") and Russian flags instead. President Petr Pavel subsequently criticized both sides for the conduct of their campaigns, calling them "unfair and dangerous".

==== SPOLU ====
SPOLU launched its campaign in Prague, in the café of Činoherní klub, where the Civic Forum was established around 30 years earlier. The launch was led by the leaders of the constituent parties—Petr Fiala, Markéta Pekarová Adamová and Marian Jurečka—as well as the list leader, ODS MEP Alexandr Vondra.

The alliance restated that it was an umbrella movement for conservatives, economic liberals and Christian democrats. As its slogan, it chose "Bezpečná Evropa, silnější Česko" (English: "Safe Europe, stronger Czechia") and framed the election as a "clash between democratic parties and one-man projects". Vondra said that the alliance's goal was to win the election.

Vondra said Spolu would push for modifications to the European Green Deal. As lead priorities, he named defense and security, handling of immigration into Europe, and "kickstarting the European economy". He also said that wanted to replicate the "great Danish immigration model" and ease regulations concerning the manufacture of heavy weapons.

==== STAN ====
Mayors and Independents launched their campaign before all other parties, with their leader Vít Rakušan starting a series of "Debates without censorship" in January, where he visited less-developed regions, mostly in the former Sudetenland, to answer questions from the local public. Some experts criticized these events, accusing Rakušan of using low-income people to gain popularity. Others praised Rakušan for creating opportunities for dialogue.

While the early debates were not a formal part of the European election campaign, they were financed from STAN's EP election funds from the beginning. In April, Rakušan passed the debates to the leaders of STAN's candidate list, Jan Farský and Danuše Nerudová. The debates also moved to larger cities like Brno.

As STAN's priorities, Nerudová mentioned fighting climate change, lowering the minimum voting age to 16, making the EU more accessible for young people, and preventing illegal migration. She also said they want to focus on lowering economical inequality between regions, helping Europe's competitiveness, and lowering bureaucracy.

==== Pirates ====
The Pirates launched their campaign on the last day of April, stating that they intended to focus on digitalization, improving quality of life, and fighting corruption and tax havens. The also mentioned support for abortion rights and LGBTQ+ rights, as well as reducing inequality between EU regions. The party also proposed "fixing" the European Green Deal. As their goal, the party stated that it wanted to win three to four seats.

Both party leader Ivan Bartoš and list leader Marcel Kolaja criticised the political regimes in Hungary and Slovakia, calling their prime ministers "merchants of fear" who "push society towards the east". They also criticised some Czech parties, like ODS, for maintaining ties with parties within the ECR faction.

==== SPD and Tricolour ====
SPD began its campaign as a series of meetings with voters and supporters, at which the party presented its candidates and manifesto. The meetings were intended to gain traction for a planned demonstration on Prague's Wenceslas Square, however, only about 1,000 people attended, far less than similar demonstrations in the two previous years. During the speech of SPD leader Tomio Okamura at the demonstration, opponents threw eggs at him, and were subsequently arrested.

The leaders of the two parties said their goal was to attract dissatisfied ODS voters, arguing that ODS had abandoned its Eurosceptic policies and switched to support for the Green Deal, EU migration pact and euro adoption. SPD said they wanted to attract voters by focusing on economic issues, giving the lead spot to economist and former Svobodní MEP Petr Mach.

== MEPs not standing for re-election ==
Name	Party	Date announced	Source
Jan Zahradil	Civic Democratic Party (ECR)	5 June 2023	
Radka Maxová	Independent (S&D)	31 October 2023	
Stanislav Polčák	Mayors and Independents (EPP)	3 January 2024	
Evžen Tošenovský	Civic Democratic Party (ECR)	5 April 2024	

== Results ==
Party	Votes	%	Seats	+/–
ANO 2011	776,158	26.14	7	+1
Spolu	661,250	22.27	6	–2
Přísaha and Motorists	304,623	10.26	2	New
Stačilo!	283,935	9.56	2	+1
Mayors and Personalities for Europe	258,431	8.70	2	+1
Czech Pirate Party	184,091	6.20	1	–2
Freedom and Direct Democracy – Tricolour	170,172	5.73	1	–1
Law, Respect, Expertise	63,959	2.15	0	New
Social Democracy	55,260	1.86	0	–1
Svobodní	52,408	1.77	0	0
Greens	46,127	1.55	0	New (Note: Ran on TOP 09+STAN list in 2019)
Alliance for the Independence of the Czech Republic	14,910	0.50	0	0
Democratic Party of Greens – For Animal Rights	12,448	0.42	0	0
Better Life for the People	10,767	0.36	0	New
SEN 21 and Volt	9,955	0.34	0	New
Czech Sovereignty of Social Democracy	7,579	0.26	0	0
Czech Republic in First Place!	6,897	0.23	0	New
Mourek	6,759	0.23	0	New
Liberal Alliance of Independent Citizens	6,541	0.22	0	New
Better EU with Aliens	6,479	0.22	0	New
Hlas	6,328	0.21	0	0
Club of Committed Non-Party Members	4,561	0.15	0	0
FOR CZEXIT	3,912	0.13	0	0
Right Bloc	3,392	0.11	0	0
Swiss Democracy and SSPD–SP	2,559	0.09	0	New
Urza.cz	2,426	0.08	0	New
The Left	2,296	0.08	0	New
Referendum – Voice of the People	2,036	0.07	0	New
Seniors for Themselves	1,563	0.05	0	New
New Direction	1,067	0.04	0	–
Total	2,968,889	100.00	21	0
Valid votes	2,968,889	99.19		
Invalid/blank votes	24,339	0.81		
Total votes	2,993,228	100.00		
Registered voters/turnout	8,212,628	36.45		

=== European groups ===
Following the election, ANO 2011 left ALDE and the Renew Europe group, and subsequently co-founded Patriots for Europe. Přísaha and Motorists also joined Patriots for Europe, having initially planned to join the European Conservatives and Reformists.

Party	Seats	+/–
Patriots for Europe	9	+9
European People's Party	5	0
European Conservatives and Reformists	3	-1
Greens–European Free Alliance	1	-2
Europe of Sovereign Nations	1	+1
Non-Inscrits	2	+2
Total	21	0

=== Elected MEPs ===
Members of the European Parliament for the Czech Republic
Observers	(2003)
Delegation	(2004)
6th term	(2004)
7th term	(2009)
8th term	(2014)
9th term	(2019)
10th term	(2024)

Num	MEP	Party	EP Group	Pref. Votes
1.	Klára Dostálová	ANO	PfE	171,142
2.	Filip Turek	Přísaha	PfE	152,196
3.	Alexandr Vondra	ODS	ECR	118,492
4.	Kateřina Konečná	KSČM	NI	115,386
5.	Luděk Niedermayer	TOP 09	EPP	88,631
6.	Tomáš Zdechovský	KDU–ČSL	EPP	66,948
7.	Danuše Nerudová	STAN	EPP	59,577
8.	Jaroslava Pokorná Jermanová	ANO	PfE	49,683
9.	Jan Farský	STAN	EPP	44,503
10.	Veronika Vrecionová	ODS	ECR	35,310
11.	Jaroslav Bžoch	ANO	PfE	31,989
12.	Ondřej Kolář	TOP 09	EPP	31,623
13.	Ivan David	SPD	ESN	30,892
14.	Ondřej Dostál	SD-SN	NI	24,403
15.	Markéta Gregorová	Pirates	Greens-EFA	23,388
16.	Nikola Bartůšek	Přísaha	PfE	21,162
17.	Ondřej Krutílek	ODS	ECR	20,504
18.	Jana Nagyová	ANO	PfE	14,448
19.	Martin Hlaváček	ANO	PfE	10,662
20.	Ondřej Knotek	ANO	PfE	8,565
21.	Ondřej Kovařík	ANO	PfE	4,863

== Opinion polling ==
Polling firm	Fieldwork date	Sample size	SPOLU ECR–EPP	ANO Renew	Piráti G/EFA	STAN EPP	SPD– Trikolóra ID	Stačilo! Left	SOCDEM S&D	Svobodní NI	PaM NI	Zelení EGP	PRO NI	Others	Lead
7–8 June 2024	Election result		22.3; 6	26.1; 7	6.2; 1	8.7; 2	5.7; 1	9.6; 2	1.9; 0	1.8; 0	10.3; 2	1.6; 0	2.2; 0	3.9; 0	3.8
STEM	22–26 May 2024	1,623	21.5; 6	23.1; 6	9.4; 2	10.0; 3	9.5; 2	8.1; 2	2.9; 0	2.7; 0	4.7; 0	1.9; 0	1.8; 0	4.1; 0	1.6
STEM/MARK	20–27 May 2024	1,398	22.3; 5	26.1; 6	12.1; 3	8.1; 2	7.9; 2	7.7; 2	3.6; 0	2.3; 0	7.2; 1	1.4; 0	1.0; 0	0.3; 0	3.8
Phoenix Research	1–13 May 2024	1,018	17.5; 5	27.4; 7	9.9; 2	11.5; 3	6.2; 1	7.0; 2	5.0; 1	1.3; 0	2.2; 0	—N/a	4.2; 0	7.8; 1	9.9
SANEP	2–7 May 2024	1,800	19.8; 5	26.7; 7	10.6; 3	9.9; 2	10.1; 3	5.9; 1	3.7; 0	2.9; 0	4.8; 0	0.5; 0	3.2; 0	1.9; 0	6.9
STEM/Mark	28 Mar–8 April 2024	1,009	20.0; 5	27.5; 7	10.1; 2	10.4; 3	10.4; 2	6.7; 1	3.4; 0	2.5; 0	6.0; 1	0.9; 0	—N/a	1.9; 0	7.5
Data Collect	25 Mar 2024		20.9	27.3	10.8	9.3	10.9	7.1	2.9	1.5	2.5	2.5	1.9	2.4	6.4
IPSOS	23 Feb–5 Mar 2024	1,517	21.6	26.3	11.3	13.4	7.9	6.1	2.7	2.8	4.9	—N/a	—N/a	—N/a	4.7
IPSOS	Dec 2023	TBA	25.2	26.3	10.0	12.0	7.7	6.0	—N/a	—N/a	—N/a	—N/a	—N/a	12.8	1.1
STEM/MARK	23–28 Nov 2023	1,010	15.0	33.8	11.4	7.3	14.7	5.4	3.6	2.9	—N/a	—N/a	—N/a	6.0	18.8
2021 parliamentary election	8–9 Oct 2021	–	27.8	27.1	15.6		9.6	3.6	4.7	2.8 (Note: with Trikolora)	4.7	1.0	—N/a	0.9	0.7
2019 European election	24–25 May 2019	–	21.8 (Note: ODS 14.6%, KDU-ČSL 7.2%)	21.2	14.0	11.7 (Note: with TOP 09)	9.1	6.9	4.0	0.7	—N/a	—N/a	—N/a	10.6	0.6

=== Other surveys ===
Polling firm	Fieldwork date	Sample size	SPOLU ECR–EPP	PaM NI	Piráti G/EFA	STAN EPP	mimozemstani.eu NI	LŽPL NI	ANO Renew	Zelení Greens/EFA	DSZ - ZA PRÁVA ZVÍŘAT NI	SESO NI	Lead
Student election	21–22 May 2024	22,880	15.2	14.2	11.6	9.1	6.2	6.1	5.1	4.6	4.0	2.7	1.0
