= List of members of the European Parliament for the Czech Republic, 2014–2019 =

Members of the European Parliament for the Czech Republic
Observers	(2003)
Delegation	(2004)
6th term	(2004)
7th term	(2009)
8th term	(2014)
9th term	(2019)
10th term	(2024)

This is a list of the 21 members of the European Parliament for the Czech Republic in the 2014 to 2019 session.

== List ==
Name	National party	EP Group	Votes
Dita Charanzová	ANO 2011	ALDE	8,356
Martina Dlabajová	ANO 2011	ALDE	4,789
Petr Ježek	ANO 2011	ALDE	5,301
Jan Keller	Social Democratic Party	S&D	57,812
Kateřina Konečná	Communist Party of Bohemia and Moravia	EUL–NGL	28,154
Petr Mach (2014–2017)	Party of Free Citizens	EFDD	13,211
Jiří Maštálka	Communist Party of Bohemia and Moravia	EUL–NGL	11,525
Luděk Niedermayer	TOP 09 and Mayors and Independents	EPP	37,171
Jiří Payne (2017–2019)	Party of Free Citizens	EFDD	3,696
Pavel Poc	Social Democratic Party	S&D	3,818
Miroslav Poche	Social Democratic Party	S&D	3,692
Stanislav Polčák	TOP 09 and Mayors and Independents	EPP	11,997
Jiří Pospíšil	TOP 09 and Mayors and Independents	EPP	77,724
Miloslav Ransdorf (2014–2016)	Communist Party of Bohemia and Moravia	EUL–NGL	14,384
Jaromír Kohlíček (2016–1019)	Communist Party of Bohemia and Moravia	EUL–NGL	7,051
Olga Sehnalová	Social Democratic Party	S&D	10,955
Michaela Šojdrová	Christian and Democratic Union	EPP	22,220
Jaromír Štětina	TOP 09 and Mayors and Independents	EPP	18,951
Pavel Svoboda	Christian and Democratic Union	EPP	21,746
Pavel Telička	ANO 2011	ALDE	50,784
Evžen Tošenovský	Civic Democratic Party	ECR	16,514
Jan Zahradil	Civic Democratic Party	ECR	19,892
Tomáš Zdechovský	Christian and Democratic Union	EPP	5,063

=== Party representation ===
National party	EP Group	Seats	±
ANO 2011	ALDE	4 / 21	▲4
TOP 09 and Mayors and Independents	EPP	4 / 21	▲4
Social Democratic Party	S&D	4 / 21	▼3
Communist Party of Bohemia and Moravia	EUL–NGL	3 / 21	▼1
Christian and Democratic Union	EPP	3 / 21	▲1
Civic Democratic Party	ECR	2 / 21	▼7
Party of Free Citizens	EFDD	1 / 21	▲1
