= Jana Nagyová (politician) =

Czech politician (born 1970)

Jana Nagyová MEP
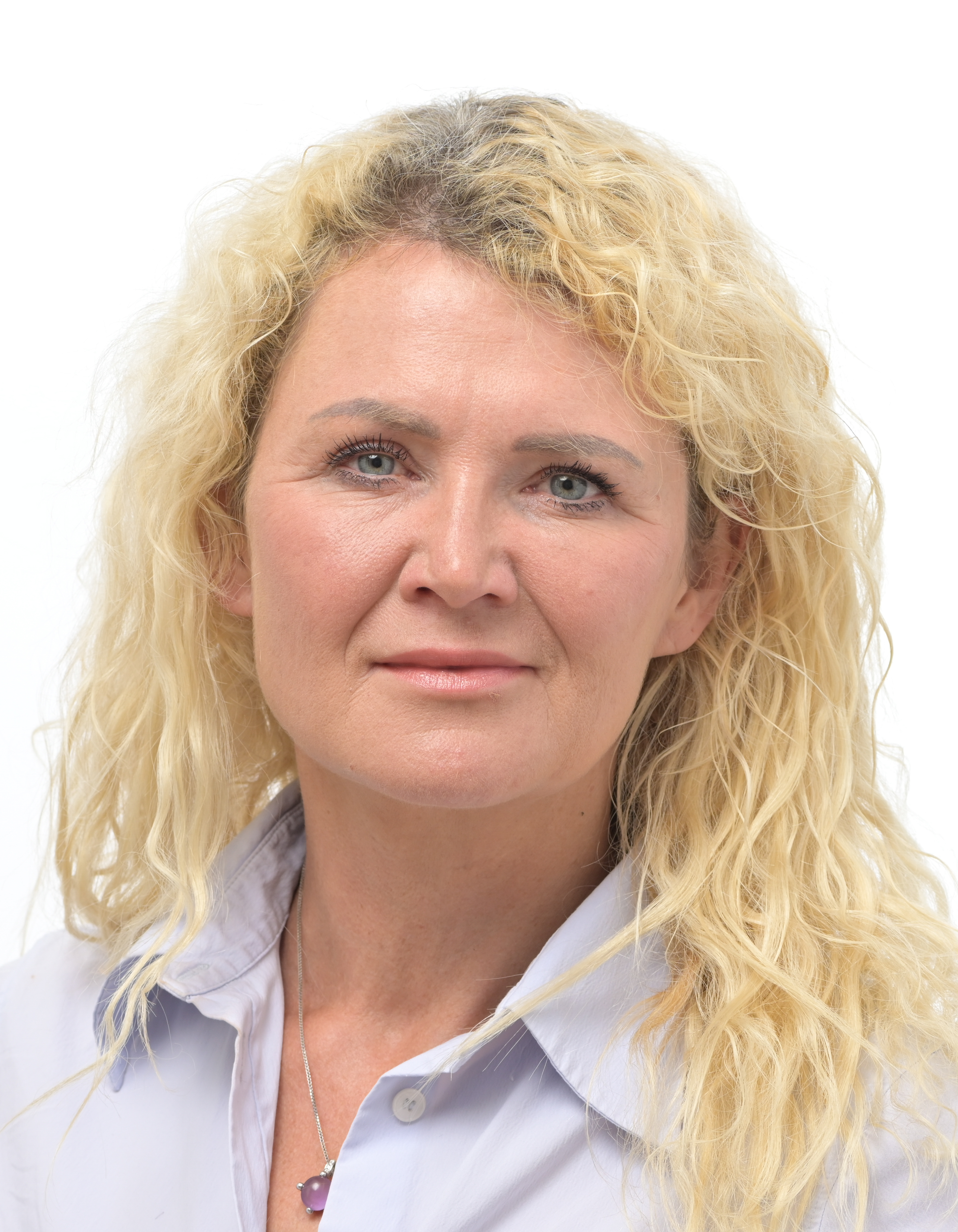
- Nagyová in 2024

Member of the European Parliament for the Czech Republic
- Incumbent
- Assumed office 16 July 2024

Personal details
- Born: 26 September 1970 (age 55) Košice, Czechoslovakia
- Party: ANO 2011
- Other political affiliations: Patriots for Europe

Jana Nagyová (born 26 September 1970) is a Czech politician of ANO 2011 who was elected member of the European Parliament in 2024. From 2016 to 2018, she served as deputy mayor of Jihlava. She is involved in the Stork Nest case, over allegations of subsidy fraud at Agrofert. She appeared on 29 January 2025 in front of the European Parliament's legal affairs committee to defend her parliamentary immunity, which protects her from proceedings from the high court in Prague.

On 4 May 2026, she was sentenced to a suspended three-year prison term and a fine of 500,000 koruna ($24,000).
