= List of members of the European Parliament for the Czech Republic, 2004 =

Members of the European Parliament for the Czech Republic
Observers	(2003)
Delegation	(2004)
6th term	(2004)
7th term	(2009)
8th term	(2014)
9th term	(2019)
10th term	(2024)

This is a list of the 24 delegates to the European Parliament for the Czech Republic in the 1999 to 2004 session.

In the transitional period between the entry of the Czech Republic into the European Union on 1 May 2004 and the elections to the European Parliament in 2004, the Czech Republic was represented in the European Parliament by 24 deputies delegated already in the spring of 2003 by the Chamber of Deputies of the Czech Republic and the Senate of the Czech Republic. Their mandates expired after deputies elected in regular elections assumed their mandates at the first plenary meeting.

From spring 2003 to 1 May 2004, they had observer status, i.e. they could only speak in committees and could not vote (however, they received information about the proceedings of the European Parliament). From 1 May 2004, they became full members of the European Parliament.

== Observers ==
This is a list of the delegates of the European Parliament from the Czech Republic in the period from 1 May 2004 to 19 July 2004.

Name	National Party	Group in EP
Miroslav Benes	ODS	EPP-ED
Milan Ekert	CSSD	PASD
Hynek Fajmon	ODS	EPP-ED
Richard Falbr	CSSD	PASD
Vilém Holáň	KDU-ČSL	EPP-ED
Kateřina Konečná	KSČM	EUL-NGL
Daniel Kroupa	non-partisan	EPP-ED
Petr Lachnit	CSSD	PASD
Vladimír Laštůvka	CSSD	PASD
Jaroslav Lobkowicz	KDU-ČSL	EPP-ED
Helena Mallotová	ODS	EPP-ED
Jiří Mastálka	KSČM	EUL-NGL
Miroslav Ouzky	ODS	EPP-ED
Alena Palečková	ODS	EPP-ED
Jiří Pospíšil	ODS	EPP-ED
Miloslav Ransdorf	KSČM	EUL-NGL
Libor Rouček	CSSD	PASD
Helena Rögnerová	non-partisan	ALDE
Ludek Sefzig	ODS	EPP-ED
Pavel Svoboda	US-DEU	EPP-ED
Petr Šulak	CSSD	PASD
Miloš Titz	CSSD	PASD
Josef Vaculík	KDU-ČSL	EPP-ED
Jan Zahradil	ODS	EPP-ED
