= List of observers to the European Parliament for the Czech Republic, 2003–2004 =

Members of the European Parliament for the Czech Republic
Observers	(2003)
Delegation	(2004)
6th term	(2004)
7th term	(2009)
8th term	(2014)
9th term	(2019)
10th term	(2024)

This is a list of the 24 observers to the European Parliament for the Czech Republic in the 1999 to 2004 session. They were appointed by the Czech Parliament as observers from 1 May 2003 until the accession of the Czech Republic to the EU on 1 May 2004.

== List ==
Name	National party	EP Group
Hynek Fajmon	Civic Democratic Party	EPP–ED
Richard Falbr	Social Democratic Party	PES
Robert Kolář		
Jiří Maštálka	Communist Party (Bohemia and Moravia)	EUL–NGL
Miroslav Ouzký	Civic Democratic Party	EPP–ED
