= Ondřej Kovařík =

Czech politician (born 1980)

Ondřej Kovařík MEP
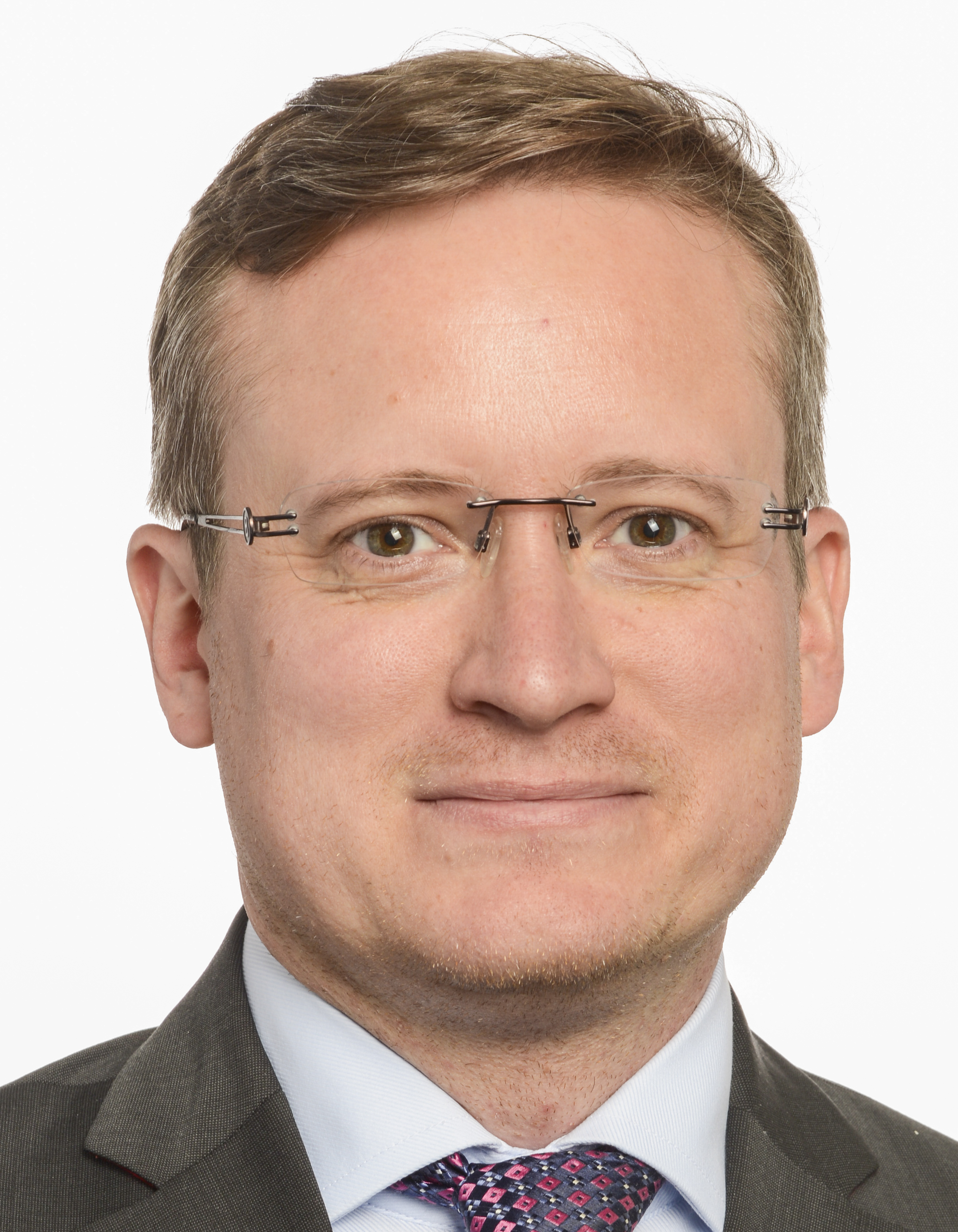

Member of the European Parliament for Czech Republic
- In office 2 July 2019 – 30 July 2025

Personal details
- Born: 21 August 1980 (age 46) Kyjov, Czechoslovakia
- Party: Independent (nominated by ANO 2011) (2019–present)
- Education: Prague University of Economics and Business
- Website: ondrejkovarik.eu

Ondřej Kovařík is a Czech politician who was elected as a Member of the European Parliament in 2019 until 2025 He was parliamentary assistant to MEP Dita Charanzová. has since been serving on the Committee on Economic and Monetary Affairs, also called ECON, and the Committee on Civil Liberties, Justice and Home Affairs, aka LIBE. In addition to his committee assignments, he is part of the Parliament's delegation for relations with Canada. He has studied international trade and international affairs and is affiliated to the ANO 2011 movement (Action of Dissatisfied Citizens) set up by Andrej Babiš, former Czech Prime Minister.

== Career ==
In October 2015, Kovařík worked as chief advisor of the parliamentary delegation of ANO in the European Parliament to compatriot Dita Charanzová.

In the 2019 European Parliament election, Kovařík finished sixth place as a non-party member of ANO. He was re-elected in 2024 European Parliament election, finishing seventh place of the candidates.

He resigned from the European Parliament for 'family issues' in July 2025 and was replaced by former ambassador to Norway, Jaroslav Knot.
