= Jaroslav Bžoch =

Czech politician (born 1983)

Jaroslav Bžoch MEP
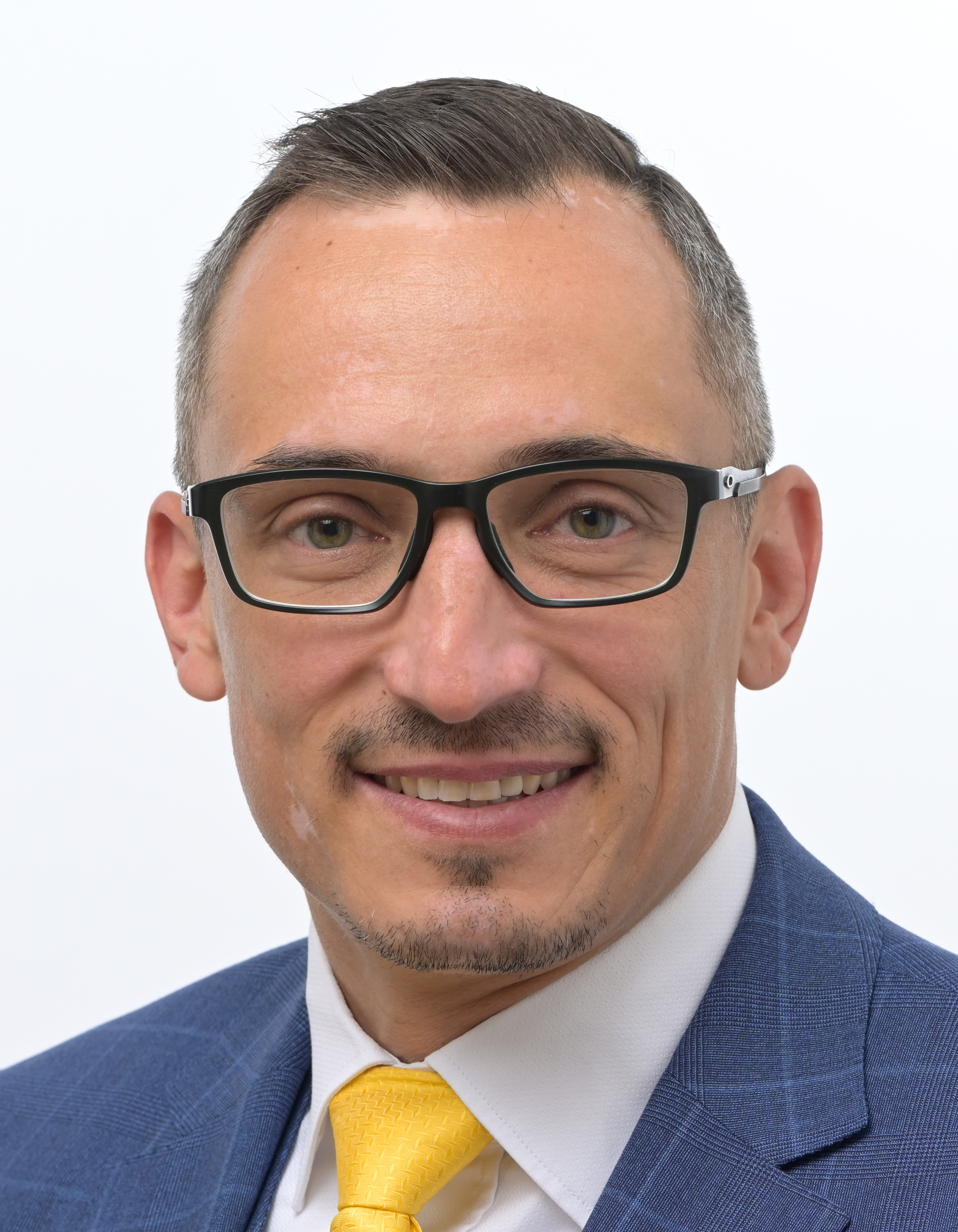
- Bžoch in 2017

Member of the European Parliament
- Incumbent
- Assumed office 16 July 2024
- Constituency: Czech Republic

Member of the Chamber of Deputies
- In office 21 October 2017 – 28 June 2024
- Succeeded by: Kamila Bláhová
- Constituency: Ústí nad Labem

Personal details
- Born: 30 November 1983 (age 42) Teplice, Czechoslovakia
- Party: ANO (since 2011); ODS (2007–2011)
- Other political affiliations: Patriots for Europe
- Education: Metropolitan University Prague; Jan Evangelista Purkyně University
- Rugby league career

Playing information
- Position: Centre
Representative
| Years | Team | Pld | T | G | FG | P |
|---|---|---|---|---|---|---|
| 2012–23 | Czech Republic | 11 | 2 | 0 | 0 | 8 |

Refereeing information
| Years | Competition | Apps |
| 2018– | Senior International Matches | 6 |

Jaroslav Bžoch (born 30 November 1983) is a Czech politician of ANO and former rugby league player. He was elected member of the European Parliament in 2024. He previously served in the Chamber of Deputies, serving as vice-chair of the foreign affairs committee.

== Early life and education ==
Bžoch graduated from the Metropolitan University Prague with a degree in international relations and European studies, and earned a bachelor's degree in business economics and management at Jan Evangelista Purkyně University in Ústí nad Labem.

== Career ==
Bžoch was elected municipal councillor of Teplice in the 2014 municipal elections. He was elected regional councillor of Ústí nad Labem Region in 2016, and to the Chamber of Deputies in 2017.

Bžoch was elected in 2021 with 3,613 preferential votes. He was elected the party assembly in February 2022, he was elected a member of the movement's board.

Bžoch ran for the second candidate of ANO in the 2024 European Parliament election. The party won the election and he became one of the six MEPs with 31,989 preferential votes. Bžoch resigned as a member of the Chamber of Deputies at the end of June and was replaced by Kamila Bláhová.
