= Jaroslav Knot =

Czech politician (born 1977)

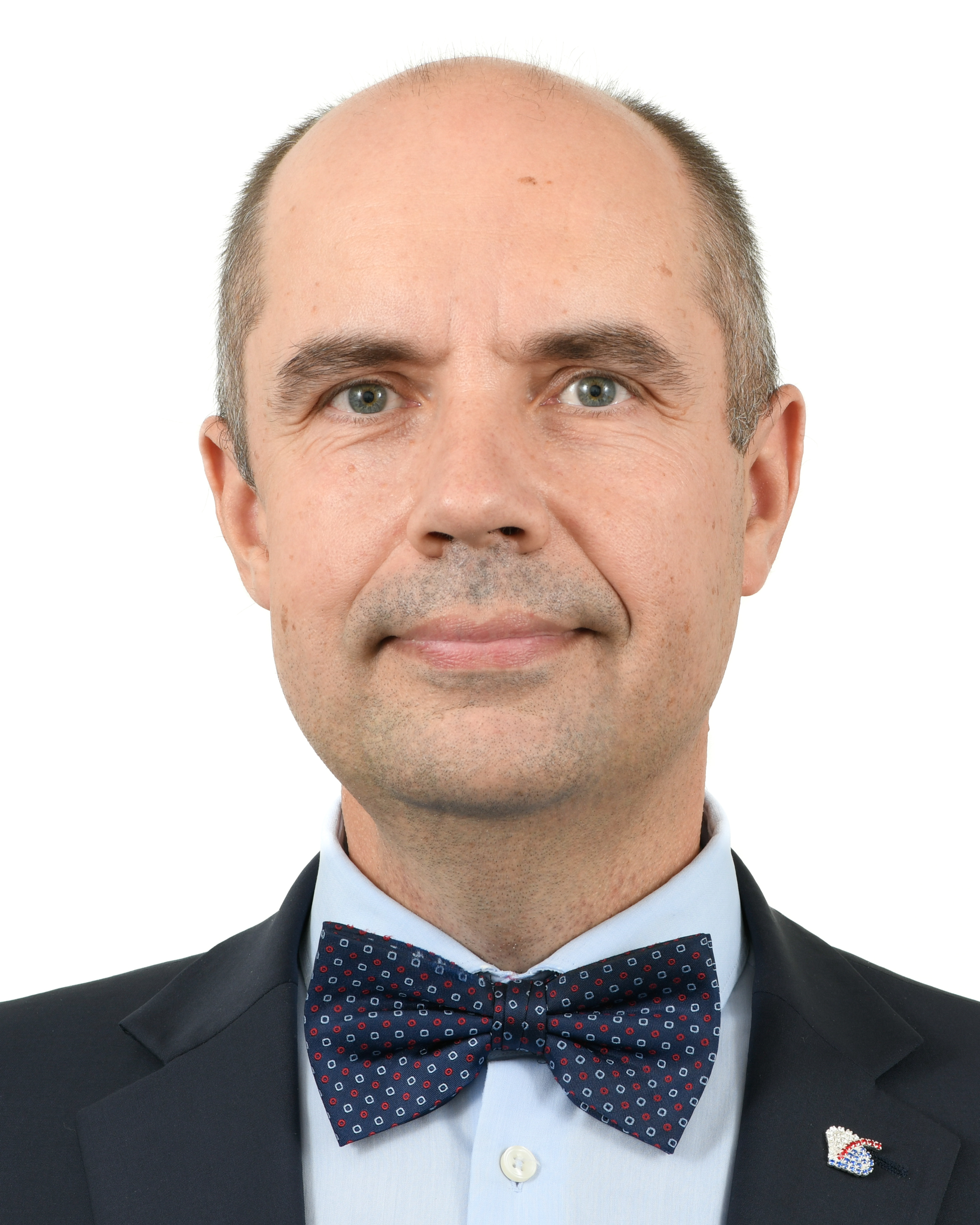

Member of the European Parliament
- Incumbent
- Assumed office 31 July 2025
- Preceded by: Ondřej Kovařík
- Constituency: Czech Republic

Personal details
- Born: 20 October 1977 (age 48) Uherské Hradiště, Czechoslovakia
- Party: Independent (nominated by ANO)
- Education: Masaryk University

Jaroslav Knot (born 20 October 1977) is a Czech politician serving as a member of the European Parliament since 2025. From 2017 to 2022, he served as ambassador to Norway.
