= František Talíř =

Czech politician (born 1993)

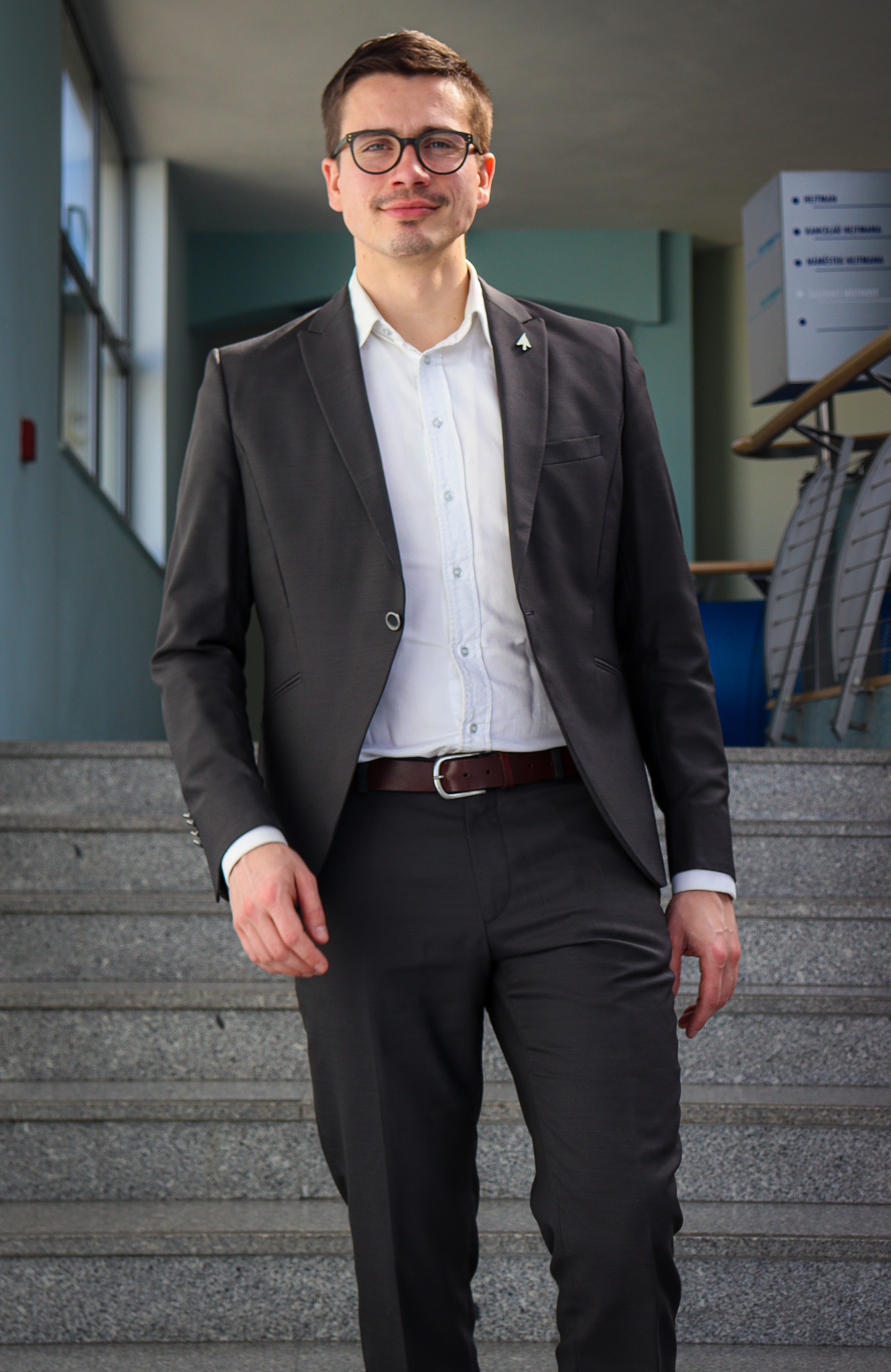
- Talíř in 2019

Member of the Chamber of Deputies
- Incumbent
- Assumed office 4 October 2025
- Constituency: South Bohemian Region

Personal details
- Born: 24 June 1993 (age 33)
- Party: KDU-ČSL
- Education: University of South Bohemia

František Talíř (born 24 June 1993) is a Czech politician serving as a member of the Chamber of Deputies since 2025. From 2024 to 2025, he served as deputy minister of the environment. From 2020 to 2024, he served as deputy governor of the South Bohemian Region.
