= Ondřej Knotek =

Czech politician (born 1984)

Ondřej Knotek MEP
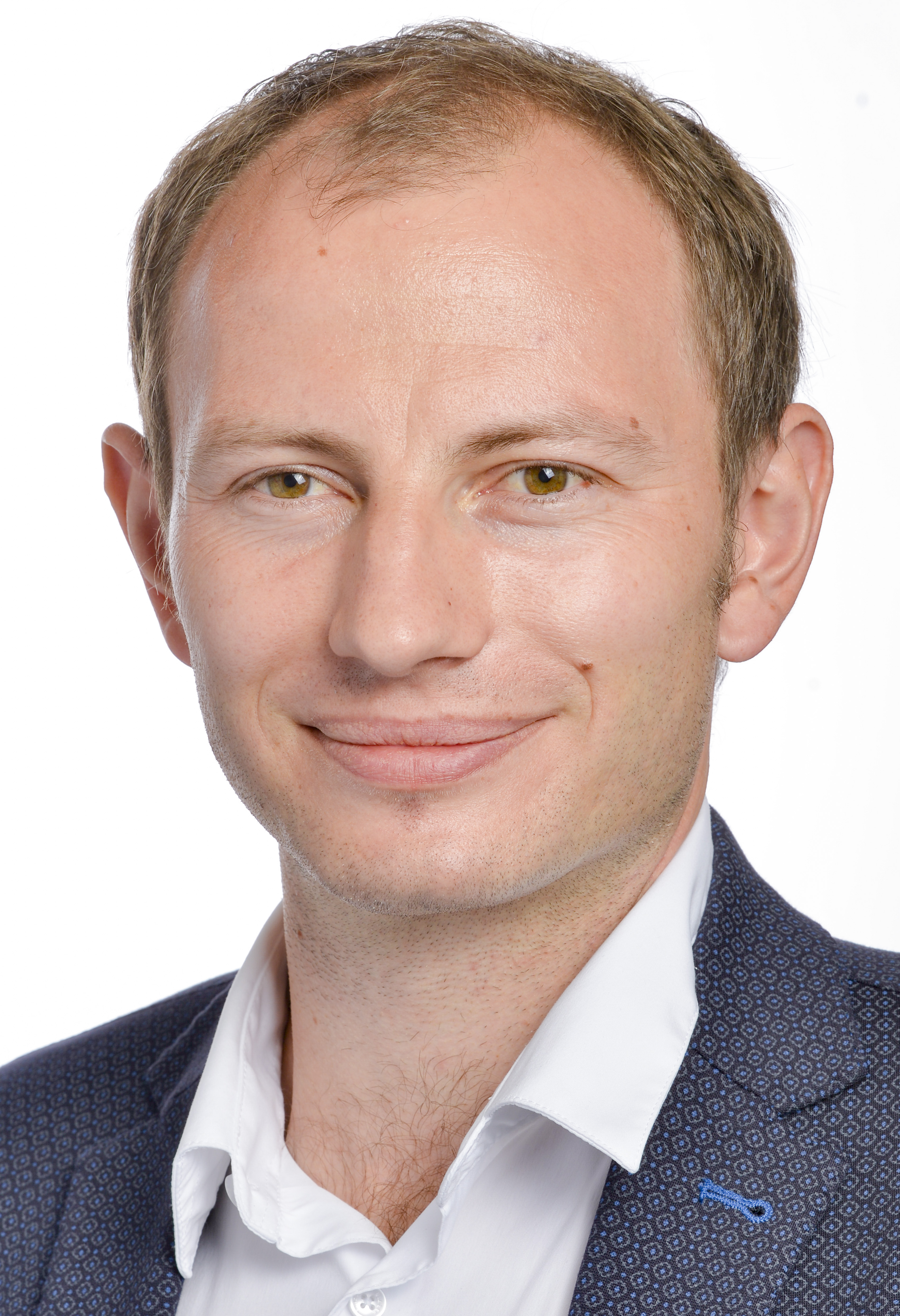

Member of the European Parliament for Czech Republic
- Incumbent
- Assumed office 2 July 2019

Personal details
- Born: 31 August 1984 (age 42) Sušice, Czechoslovakia
- Party: Czech Pirate Party (2012–2015); ANO 2011 (2015–present)
- Education: University of Chemistry and Technology, Prague

Ondřej Knotek (born 31 August 1984) is a Czech politician who was elected as a Member of the European Parliament in 2019.

In parliament, Knotek has since been serving on the Committee on Regional Development. In 2020, he also joined the Special Committee on Beating Cancer.

== Early life ==
Ondřej Knotek was born in Sušice.

Prior to being a member of the European Parliament, Knotek worked as a quality manager in an engineering company in Tachov. He also served as a member of the supervisory board of the Mariánské Lázně Hospital between 2015 and 2016.

== Political career ==
In 2014 Czech municipal elections, Knotek was elected as a representative of the city of Mariánské Lázně from the position of the leader of the pirate candidate. He went on to become a city councilor, but left Czech Pirate Party in June 2015 due to a "value split" and joined the ANO 2011 movement a few months later. Knotek resigned as a city councilor in March 2016. In the 2018 Czech Senate election, he failed to defend the mandate of the city representative as a member of ANO 2011.

During the 2019 European Parliament election in the Czech Republic, Knotek finished fifth place as an MEP for the ANO 2011 movement. In 2020 Czech regional elections, he ran for the Representative Office of the Karlovy Vary region from the 38th place, but was not elected. In the 2022 Czech municipal elections, he did not ran for the Mariánské Lázně council from the last 21st place of the candidate list.

During the 2024 European Parliament election in the Czech Republic, Knotek defended the MEP mandate as a member of the ANO movement in the third place of the candidates. The movement won the election and he defended his mandate with 8,565 preferential votes.
