= Radka Maxová =

Czech politician (born 1968)

Radka Maxová MEP
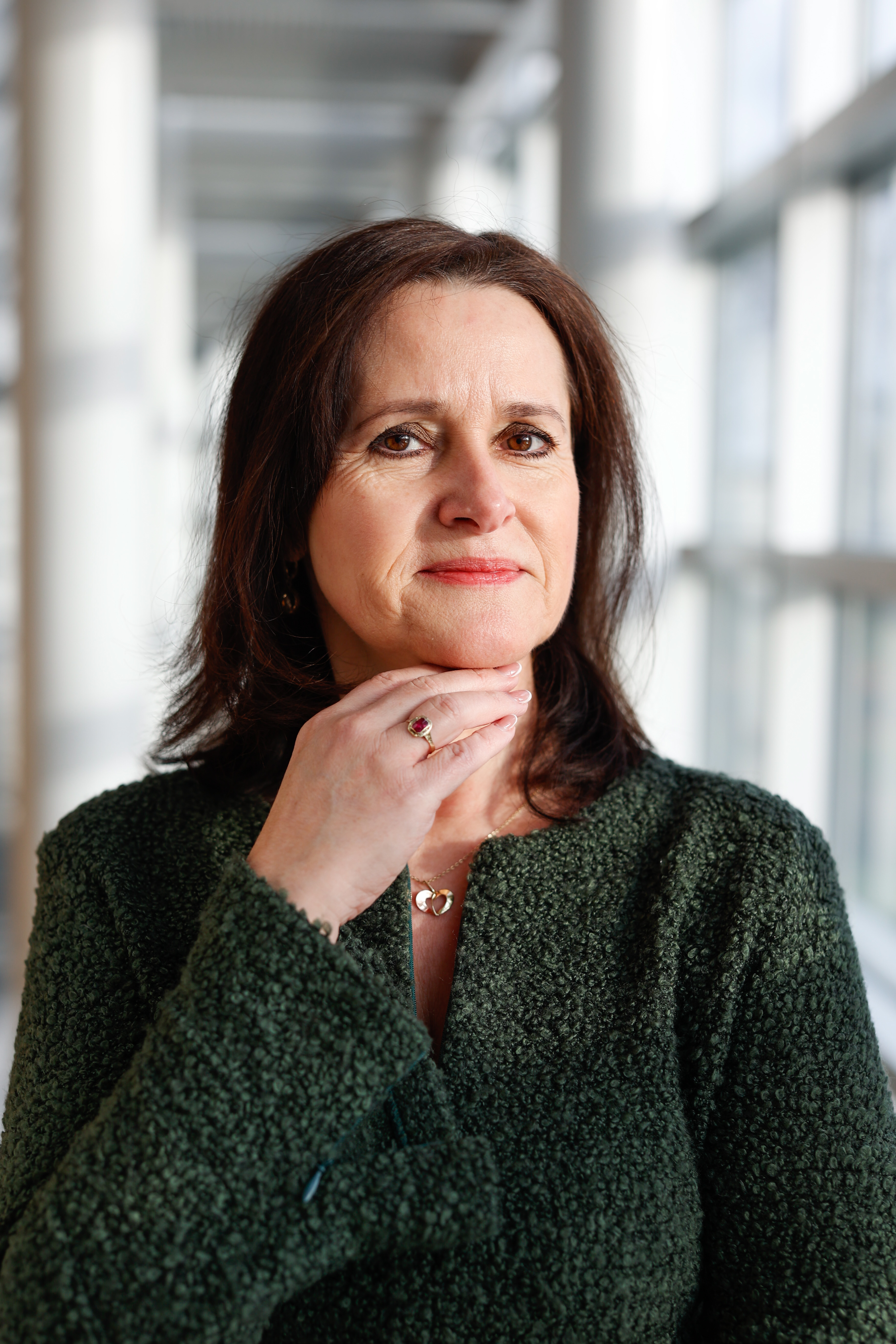

Member of the European Parliament for Czech Republic
- In office 2 July 2019 – 15 July 2024

Personal details
- Born: 2 December 1968 (age 57) Pardubice, Czechoslovakia
- Party: Social Democratic Party (2021–present)
- Other political affiliations: ANO (2012–2020)
- Education: University of Chemistry and Technology, Prague

Radka Maxová (born 2 December 1968) is a Czech politician who was elected as a Member of the European Parliament in 2019.

== Political career ==
In parliament, Maxová has been serving on as the vice-chair of the Committee on Women’s Rights and Gender Equality (since 2022), as a member of the Special Committee on foreign interference in all democratic processes in the European Union, including disinformation (since 2021) and as a substitute of the Committee on the Environment, Public Health and Food Safety.

In addition to her committee assignments, Maxová is part of the Parliament's delegations to the EU-Chile Joint Parliamentary Committee; to the Euronest Parliamentary Assembly and to the EU-Moldova Parliamentary Association Committee.

She is also a member of the European Parliament Intergroup on LGBT Rights, the European Parliament Intergroup on Disability and a supporter of the MEP Alliance for Mental Health.

In October 2020 she left ANO 2011 and joined Czech Social Democratic Party as an independent.
