= Martin Hlaváček =

Czech politician (born 1980)

Martin Hlaváček MEP
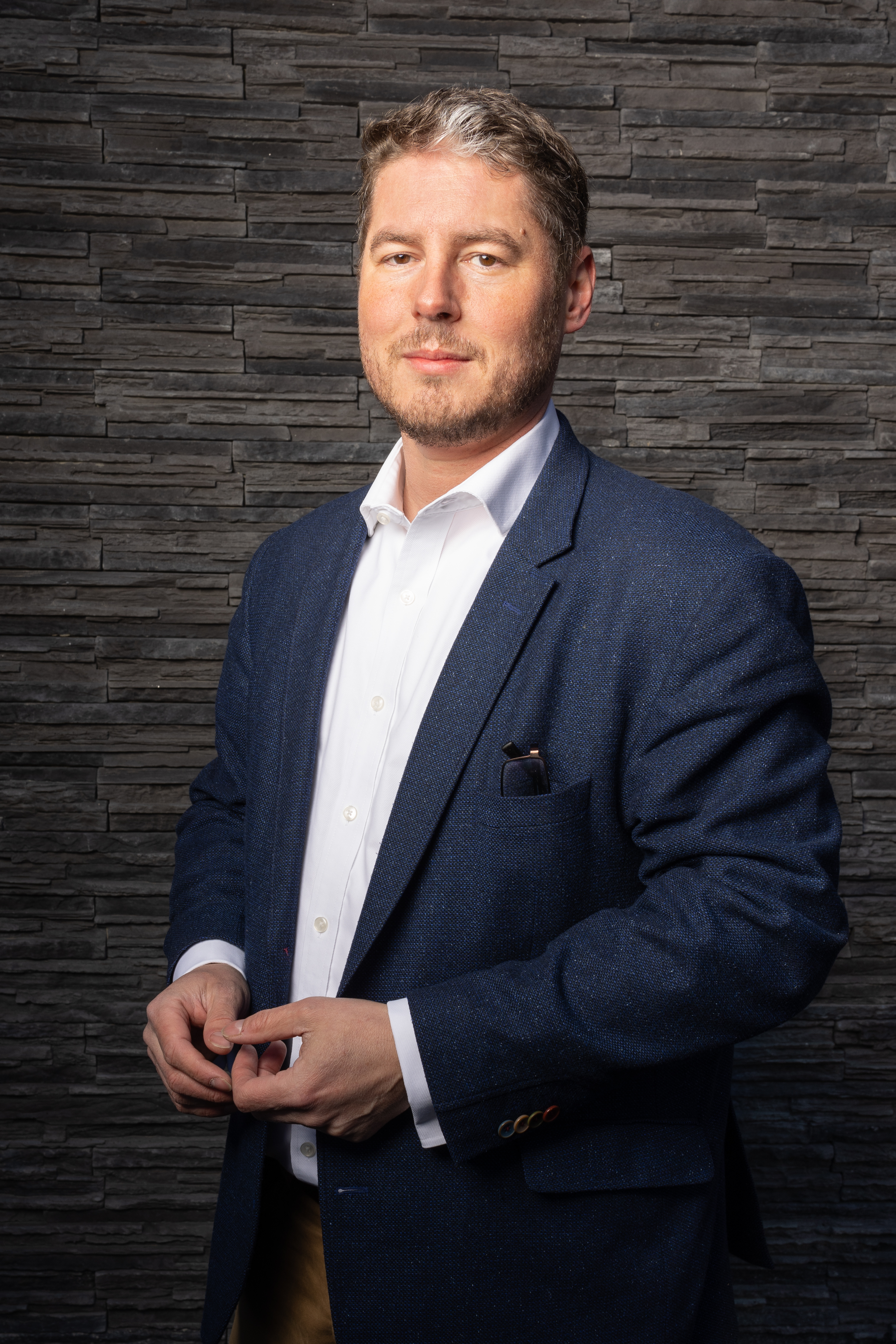

Member of the European Parliament for Czech Republic
- In office 2 July 2019 – 31 July 2024

Personal details
- Born: 14 January 1980 (age 46) Prague, Czechoslovakia
- Party: Independent (nominated by ANO 2011) (2019–present)
- Education: Czech University of Life Sciences Prague
- Website: martin-hlavacek.eu

Martin Hlaváček is a Czech politician who was elected as a Member of the European Parliament in 2019 and re-elected in 2024. Hlaváček did not continue as MEP due to serious personal reasons and was replaced by Tomáš Kubín.
