= Ondřej Krutílek =

Czech politician (born 1981)

Ondřej Krutílek MEP
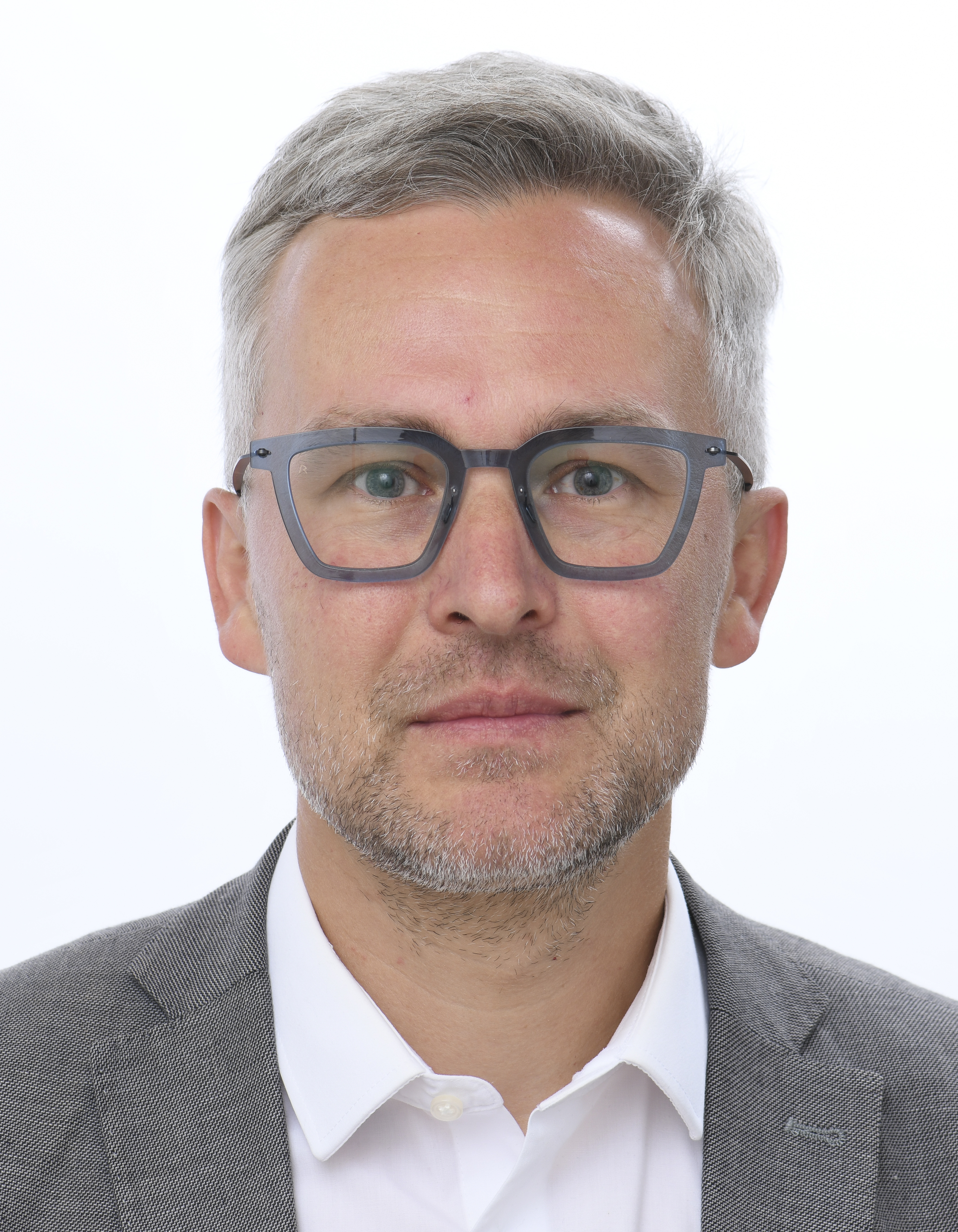

Member of the European Parliament for the Czech Republic
- Incumbent
- Assumed office 16 July 2024

Personal details
- Born: 30 April 1981 (age 44)
- Party: Civic Democratic Party (2019–present)
- Other political affiliations: European Conservatives and Reformists Party

Ondřej Krutílek (born 30 April 1981 in Nový Jičín) is a Czech politician, analyst, political scientist, and university lecturer. Since 2019, he has been a member of the Civic Democratic Party (ODS). In 2024, he was elected a member of the European Parliament. He lives in Brno and is the father of three sons.

== Education and academic career ==
He attended elementary school in Hodslavice and later in Nový Jičín, and went on to study at Masaryk Grammar School in Příbor.

From 1999 to 2004, he studied political science, international relations, and European studies at the Faculty of Social Studies at Masaryk University in Brno, where he subsequently began working as an external lecturer. He also lectured at Mendel University and at secondary schools.

He has long focused on topics related to the European Union and policy analysis.

== Professional career ==
In 2004, he began working as an analyst of European legislation at the Center for the Study of Democracy and Culture (CDK). From 2009 to 2014, he served as an accredited parliamentary assistant in the European Parliament. He worked for Hynek Fajmon and Ivo Strejček (both ODS).

From 2009 to 2014, he served as editor-in-chief of the Revue Politika journal. From 2011 to 2014, he was a member and subsequently a vice-chairman of the board of directors of the Association for the Support of Democracy and Human Rights (DEMAS). From 2013 to 2019, he was director of the consulting company B&P Research, where he was analyzing European legislation for the commercial sector. Since 2015, he has led the European Information Project think-tank.

From 2016 to 2019, he was vice-chairman of the executive board of the Pravý břeh – Institut Petra Fialy association. Between 2019 and 2024, he worked as chief of staff to Alexandr Vondra MEP.

== Political activities ==
Ondřej Krutílek is the originator of the ODS program document "A Strong Czechia in 21st Century Europe" (2017), which laid the foundation for the ODS's European policy.

In 2019, he ran in the European Parliament elections as an independent candidate for the ODS. Although he was the fourth on the party list and the party did win four seats, Alexandr Vondra, who was running from the 15th place, pushed Krutílek down to the list of substitutes thanks to nearly 30,000 preferential votes. Krutílek then became director of Vondra's office and joined the ODS in the fall of 2019.

In this position, he participated in a number of key legislative processes, particularly in the final formulation of the Euro 7 emission standard. Together with Alexandr Vondra and Martin Kupka, then-Minister of Transport, he negotiated a coalition of eight EU member states that pushed through modifications to the European Commission's proposal.

In the European Parliament elections in June 2024, he ran as a member of the ODS in fifth place on the SPOLU alliance list (i.e., ODS, KDU-ČSL, and TOP 09). He received 20,504 preferential votes and thus became a new Member of the European Parliament.

Like the other two ODS MEPs (Alexandr Vondra and Veronika Vrecionová), he is a member of the European Conservatives and Reformists (ECR) parliamentary group.

In the European Parliament, Ondřej Krutílek is a member of the following bodies:

- ITRE (Committee on Industry, Research and Energy) – member, deputy coordinator
- TRAN (Committee on Transport and Tourism) – substitute
- SANT (Committee on Public Health) – substitute
- DKOR (Delegation for Relations with the Korean Peninsula) – member
- DASE (Delegation for Relations with Southeast Asia and ASEAN) – substitute

== Political themes and priorities ==
Ondřej Krutílek presents himself as a Euro-realist who advocates a pragmatic approach to European integration. He argues that the European Union should "do less, but do it better" and focus on areas where it provides real added value.

In the European Parliament, he specializes in industrial policy, energy, and research. He has long been involved in analyzing EU legislation in the areas of the internal market, the digital economy, transport, healthcare, and economic and monetary union.

=== Automotive industry and emission standards ===
He is a strong advocate for the competitiveness of the European, and especially the Czech, automotive industry. He criticizes excessive EU regulation, opposes the ban on the sale of cars with combustion engines after 2035, and draws attention to the excessively high fines imposed on car manufacturers for insufficient shares of electric cars in their product lines.

In 2023, he actively opposed the original draft of the Euro 7 emissions standard, which he believed would mean the almost immediate end of production of small and medium-sized cars with combustion engines.

=== Energy and the Green Deal ===
He advocates a pragmatic approach to green transformation. He warns against a one-sided focus on renewable energy sources without securing backup sources. He points out that the European Union has long neglected investment in energy networks. He supports nuclear energy as a clean energy source.

He is calling for a review of the Green Deal, arguing that many standards were adopted without careful consideration and are creating an unpredictable environment that is damaging to European business.

== Selected publications ==
- FIALA, Petr, Ondřej KRUTÍLEK, and Markéta PITROVÁ: Evropská unie. 3. aktualizované a rozšířené vydání. [The European Union. 3rd updated and expanded edition]. Brno: CDK, 2018. 990 pp. ISBN 978-80-7325-450-6.
- FIALA, Petr, Petr DVOŘÁK, and Ondřej KRUTÍLEK. Politika v čase koronaviru. Předběžná analýza. [Politics in the Time of Coronavirus. Preliminary Analysis.] IPPO and Pravý Břeh – Petr Fiala Institute, 2020, 104 pp. ISBN 978-80-7485-209-1.
- FIALA, Petr, Jan ZAHRADIL, Petr DVOŘÁK, Adéla KADLECOVÁ, and Ondřej KRUTÍLEK: Silné Česko v Evropě 21. století. Pozice ODS k EU. [A Strong Czechia in 21st Century Europe. The ODS Position on the EU.] Prague: ODS, 2017. 22 pp.
- KRUTÍLEK, Ondřej (ed.): Evropská unie. Hospodářský prostor s politickou vizí. [The European Union. An Economic Area with a Political Vision.] Brno: CDK, 2013. 328 pp.
- KRUTÍLEK, Ondřej (ed.): Euro v Česku. Ano, či ne? [The Euro in Czechia. Yes or No?] Brno: Studio Arx, 2013. 152 pp.
- KRUTÍLEK, Ondřej (ed.): Petra KUCHYŇKOVÁ, Iveta PALIČKOVÁ: Monitoring evropské legislativy. [Monitoring of European Legislation.] Brno: CDK (series of eight volumes published between 2004 and 2014)
