= Ivan David =

Czech politician (born 1952)

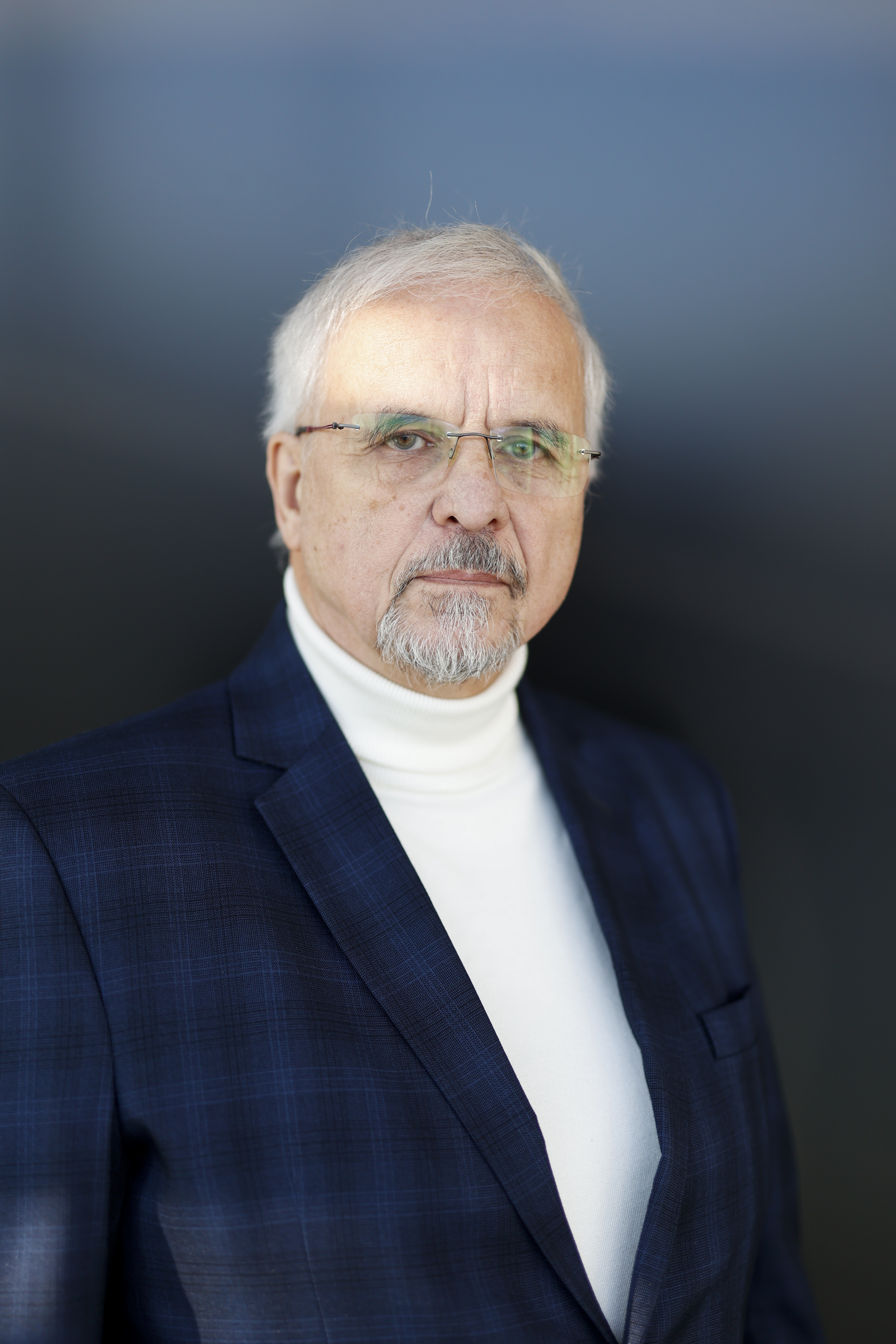

Member of the European Parliament for Czech Republic
- Incumbent
- Assumed office 2 July 2019

Minister of Health
- In office 22 July 1998 – 9 December 1999
- Prime Minister: Miloš Zeman
- Preceded by: Zuzana Roithová
- Succeeded by: Vladimír Špidla

Member of the Chamber of Deputies
- In office 20 June 1998 – 20 June 2002

Personal details
- Born: 24 September 1952 (age 73) Prague, Czechoslovakia (now Czech Republic)
- Party: SPD (2019–present)
- Other political affiliations: SOCDEM (1993–2015)
- Children: 3
- Education: Charles University
- Occupation: Psychiatrist • Politician

Ivan David (born 24 September 1952) is a Czech psychiatrist, former Minister of Health and former director of the Psychiatric Hospital of Bohnice.

== Biography ==
David was born in Prague, Czechoslovakia. He graduated from Prague High School and the Faculty of General Medicine of Charles University. He then worked as a psychiatrist. From 1998 to 2002, he was a Member of Parliament for the Social Democrats, and from 1998 to 1999, he was Minister of Health. He is the grandson of Jindřich Šnobl (1903-1971), a former deputy managing director of ČKD-Stalingrad. From 2005 to April 2008 Ivan David was a director of the psychiatric hospital in Bohnice.

Ivan David is married and has three children.

== Politics ==
Ivan David is election leader of Freedom and Direct Democracy in 2019 European Parliament election in the Czech Republic.

On 15 September 2022, he was one of 16 MEPs who voted against condemning President Daniel Ortega of Nicaragua for human rights violations, in particular the arrest of Bishop Rolando Álvarez.

Government offices
Preceded by Zuzana Roithová	Minister of Health of the Czech Republic; 1998–1999	Succeeded by Bohumil Fišer
