= Tomáš Zdechovský =

Czech politician and businessperson (born 1979)

Tomáš Zdechovský MEP
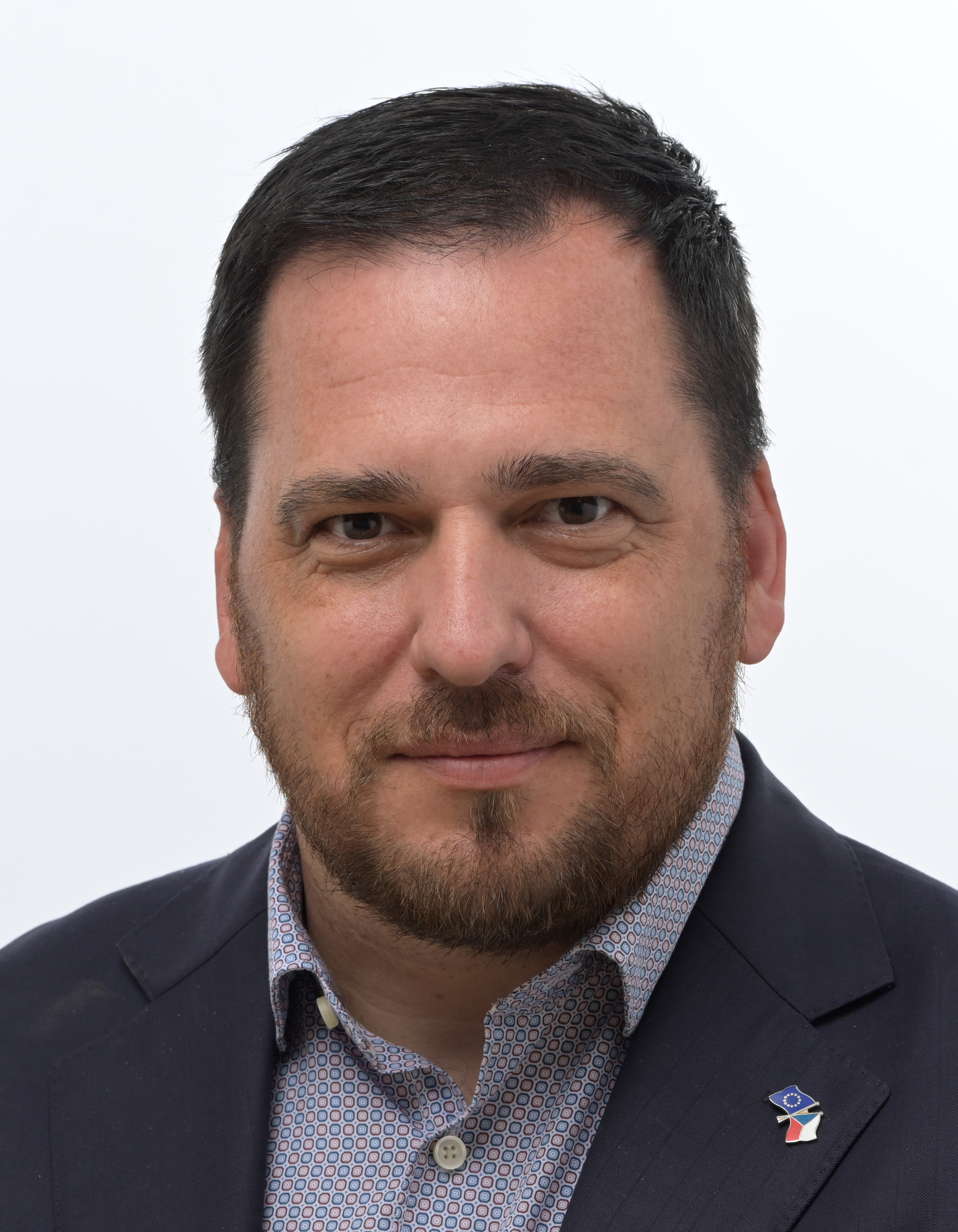
- Official portrait, 2024

Member of the European Parliament for Czech Republic
- Incumbent
- Assumed office 1 July 2014
- Constituency: Czech Republic

Personal details
- Born: 2 November 1979 (age 46) Havlíčkův Brod, Czechoslovakia
- Party: KDU-ČSL
- Other political affiliations: European People's Party
- Education: Masaryk University, University of South Bohemia
- Profession: Crisis manager, media analyst, author
- Website: zdechovsky.eu

Tomáš Zdechovský (born 2 November 1979) is a Czech politician and businessperson. In 2004, he founded Commservis.com, a communications and PR agency, of which he was CEO until his election as a Member of the European Parliament in 2014. Since 2014 he has been a Member of the European Parliament with KDU-ČSL, which is part of the European Peoples Party.

== Early life and education ==
Tomáš Zdechovský grew up in the village of Kožlí and graduated from the gymnasium in Ledeč nad Sázavou. Zdechovský has earned three master's degrees. Two of them at the University of South Bohemia, České Budějovice (Pastoral Assistant and Educator of Free Time). The third he made at the Masaryk University in Media studies. He also holds a bachelor's degree in Political Communication which he earned at the Salesian Pontifical University.

In September 2024 he completed his doctoral studies at the Faculty of Health and Social Sciences of the University of South Bohemia in the field of Rehabilitation.

== Political career ==
Zdechovský is a member of the KDU-ČSL and served as its regional manager in the Pardubice region from 2007 until 2008. He ran for the 2009 European Parliament election on the 14th place of party list, however he was not elected.

Zdechovský received much appraisal and great response for his nomination speech at the Congress of KDU-ČSL, held in June 2013 in Olomouc. During the 2014 European Parliament election, he finished third place as a candidate of KDU-ČSL was elected MEP for the eighth legislature of the house. In 2019, he ran for the European Parliament for the third time and was re-elected.

Zdechovský announced his intention to run for chairman of KDU-ČSL on 2 December 2019. However, at a party conference, he decided to withdraw his candidacy and ran for the deputy chairman of the party instead.

He was elected for the third time in the European Parliament elections in 2024.

== Political views ==
=== Migrant Crisis in Italy and Greece ===
Zdechovský has also explained on the European migrant crisis several times, having visited a couple of refugee camps in Sicily in July 2015. He said most of the people in local refugee camps were actually economic migrants. Furthermore, his criticism is aimed at Greece, which according to his words has neglected the border controls and registration of newcomers.

=== Child Protection Service in Norway ===
Zdechovský has been dealing the Michalák Case since 2014. He criticises the practice of the Norwegian Barnevernet and Norwegian child protection policy entirely and demands its modification. In late 2014, together with his fellow MEP Petr Mach, he began to actively engage in a campaign to return of Eva Michaláková's two sons, who had been taken away by Norwegian local Child Welfare Service. Both MEPs organized money collection for counsel in mother's litigation. Zdechovský also initiated an open letter to the Norwegian authorities, which was signed by nearly 50 MEPs from different countries and factions in the European Parliament.

Zdechovský is also the author of the introduction to the book Stolen Childhood: The Truth About Norway's Child Welfare System. The book was published in 2019 and deals with the issue of taking children away from their parents by Norwegian child protection service Barnevernet, the causes of the great influence of this institution and the reasons of the frequent criticism of Barnevernet for alleged human rights violations.

=== European Green Deal ===
Tomáš Zdechovský has repeatedly been critical of the European Green Deal, criticizing it in particular for its lack of thought and lack of a feasibility study.

=== Introduction of the Euro in Czechia ===
Zdechovský is a supporter of the introduction of the Euro in the Czech Republic.

== Criticism ==
Zdechovský also called for further investigation of Andrej Babiš on the grounds of alleged fraud in obtaining EU subsidies, which were designated for small businesses and where actual ownership of a farm and convention center called Stork Nest by Babiš was allegedly concealed. He also referred to alleged conflict of interest of Babiš in receiving EU subsidies for the Agrofert group due to suspicion that the latter was still actual owner even when a member of the Czech government.

Zdechovský has also pointed out the problem of mileage fraud, which concerns the second-hand car market in the Czech Republic in particular as well as other Central and Eastern Europe in general. He argues that the introduction of the Car-Pass System which has been applied in Belgium since 2006 is an effective way to tackle and prevent such fraud throughout Europe.

On October 11th 2026, as an acting member of European parliament, Zdechovský posted a 3 months chart on X.com (formely Twitter), showing that online activity around German political party AfD dropped to near zero, right after "a successful Ukrainian attack on Russian data centers". This postwent viral, viewed more 4 million times. Unfortunately it was showing data "three days from future" until the 15th of October. Those data were fictitious and obviously erroneous.

== Literature career ==
Zdechovský co-found of the group of poets called Friends of the Silent Poetic Touch (Czech: Přátelé tichého dotyku) and the author of its manifesto protesting against the cultural decline of Czech society. He has published four collections of poems: Ze zahrady mé milé (lit. 'From the Garden of my Beloved One'), Odpusť mým rtům (lit. 'Forgive My Lips'), Intimní doteky (lit. 'Intimate Touches'), and Kapka (The Drop).

In 2013, Zdechovský published his first novel titled Nekonečné ticho (lit. 'Infinite Silence'), which is about the relationship between a young man with an older woman. The book was illustrated by painter and graphic artist Klára Klose.

== Other Activities ==
Zdechovský was one of the founders of an initiative called Save Baby Jesus (Czech: Zachraňte Ježíška) in 2008 which aims at defending Czech Christmas traditions against Santa Claus. Together with Roman Celý, Christian Democratic Member of the Czech parliament, he criticised the replacement of the "peaceful" Czech All Souls Day (dušičky) in local schools with that "crazy" Halloween.

In 2012, Zdechovský was the main organiser of the proposal for the establishment of a bishopric for the region of Vysočina. The signature initiative was supported by former chairman of KDU-ČSL Jan Kasal, regional chairman TOP 09 Jiři Blazek, and regional councillor Tomáš Škaryd (ČSSD). However, the Roman Catholic parish in Jihlava distanced itself from the suggestion and dubbed these initiative rather ridiculous.

Tomáš Zdechovský also participated in negotiations for the release of Czech nationals detained or imprisoned abroad, such as the Czech reporter Radan Šprongl, detained in Thailand in 2017 or later in the case of Tereza Hlůšková, imprisoned in Pakistan for drug smuggling. He was also involved in the negotiations for the release of two Czechs, Miroslav Farkas and Markéta Všelichová, who were imprisoned in Turkey for collaborating with the Kurdish YPG militia, considered a terrorist organization by Turkey, and were finally released in July 2020.
