= Martina Dlabajová =

Czech politician, member of the European Parliament (born 1976)

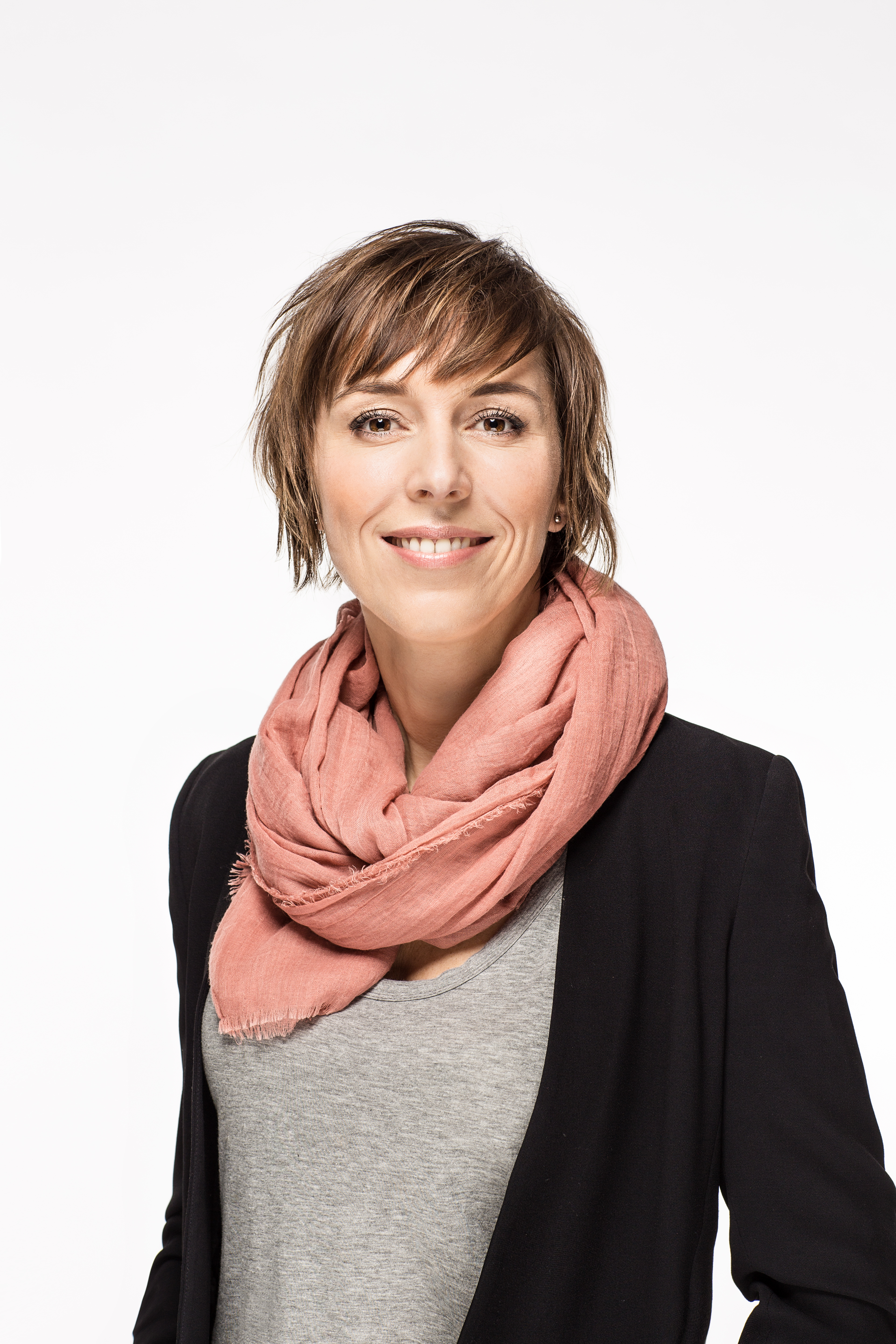

Member of the European Parliament for Czech Republic
- In office 1 July 2014 – 15 July 2024

Personal details
- Born: Martina Dlabajová; 26 July 1976 (age 50) Zlín, Czech Republic
- Party: Independent (2023–present); Renew Europe (2014–present)
- Other political affiliations: ANO 2011 (until 2023)
- Education: University of Padua
- Website: dlabajova.eu

Martina Dlabajová (born 26 July 1976) is a Czech businesswoman and international consultant, former president of the Regional Chamber of Commerce of the Zlín Region (2012 – 2014). From 2014 to 2024 she had been a Member of the European Parliament.

== Education and career ==
From 1990 to 1994 Dlabajová attended the grammar school Zlín-Lesni ctvrt and then from 1995 to 2000 she studied political science with a specialization in the European Union at the University of Padua (Dott.).

For many years Dlabajová was the coordinator of the Office of the Zlín Region in Brussels. At the end of 2012, was elected the president of the Regional Chamber of Commerce of the Zlín Region. She also founded and managed several companies in the Czech Republic, Slovak Republic and Italy.

Dlabajová speaks Italian, English, German, Spanish and Russian.

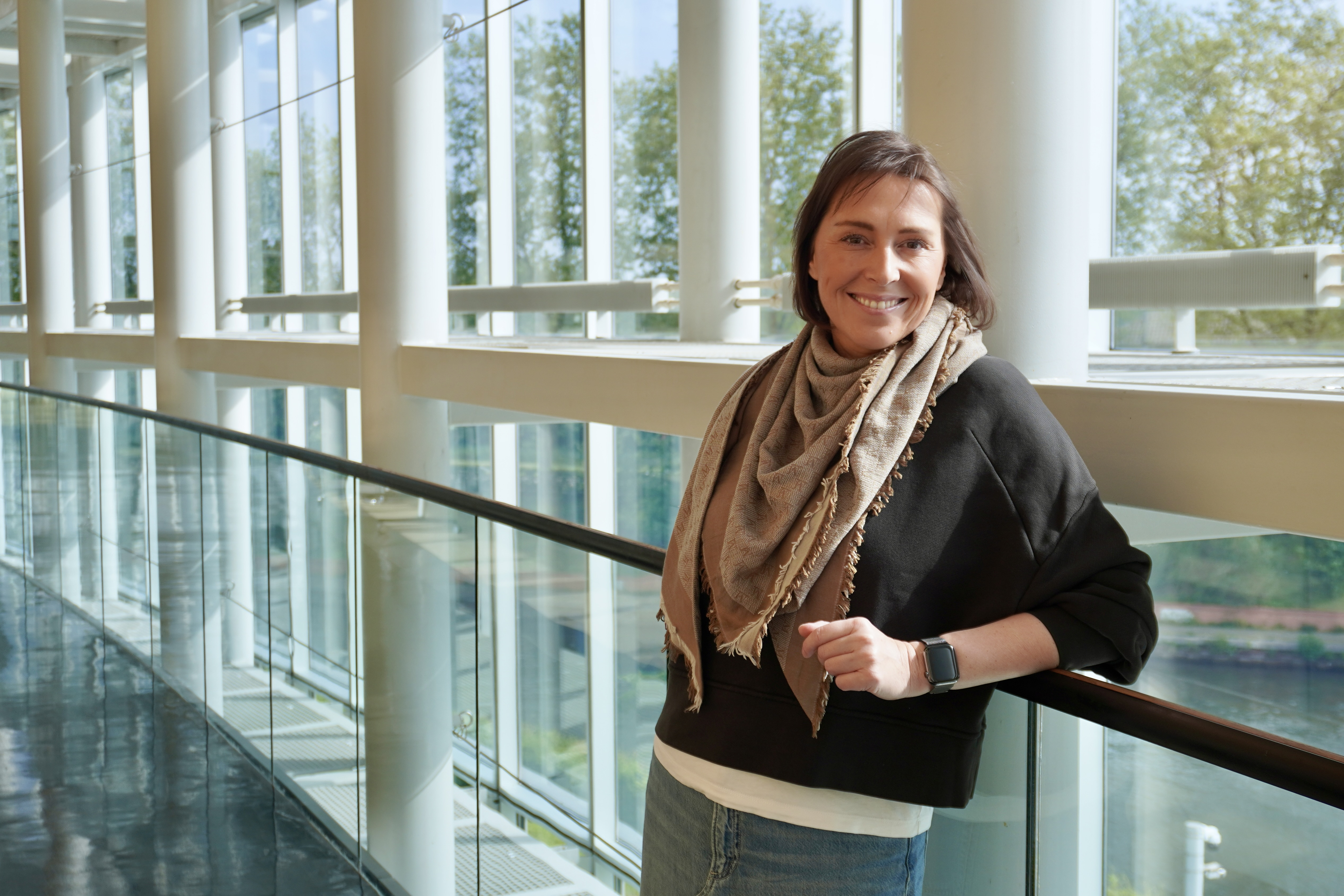
Martina Dlabajová

== Member of the European Parliament, 2014–2024 ==
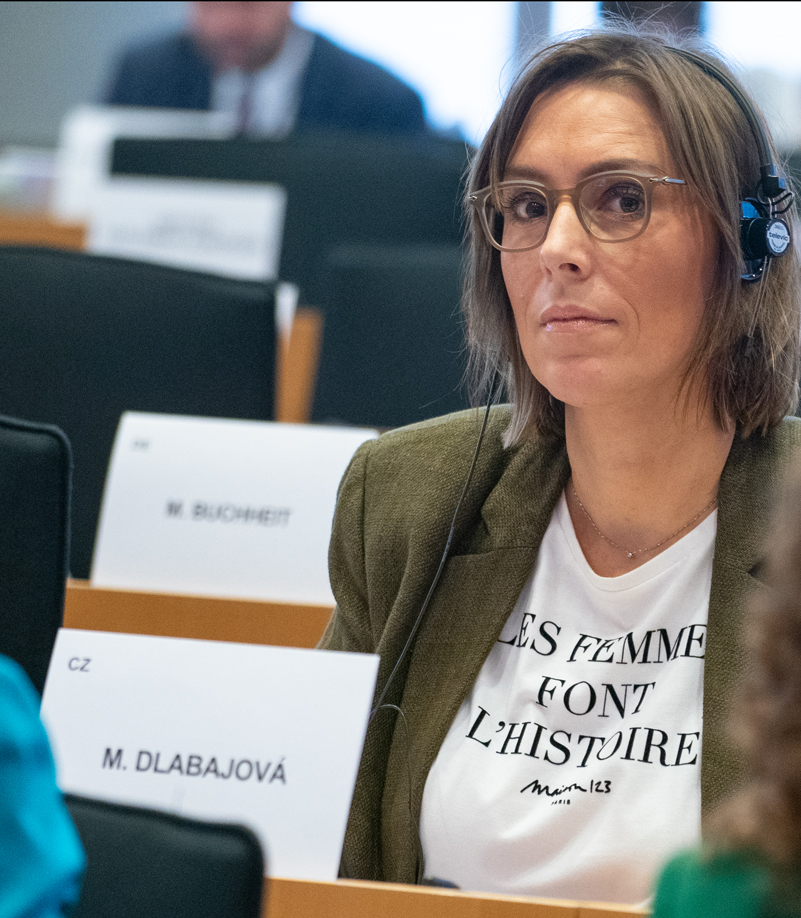
Dlabajová at a hearing of the European Parliament in 2019

In the 2014 elections to the European Parliament Dlabajová stood as a non-party candidate for the movement ANO 2011 and succeeded with 4789 number of preferential votes. She was appointed as a vice-chair in the Committee on Budgetary Control (CONT), a member in the Committee on Employment and Social Affairs (EMPL) and substitute in the Committee on Transport and Tourism. In 2022, she joined the Special Committee on the COVID-19 pandemic.

In addition to her committee assignments, Dlabajová initiated the Parliamentary Intergroup for Creative Industries and was appointed its vice-president. She is also part of the European Parliament Intergroup on Small and Medium-Sized Enterprises (SMEs).

In December 2020, Dladbajová received the Digital Single Market award at The Parliament Magazine's annual MEP Awards.

== The project WhyNot? / ProcByNe? ==
As a new MEP, the first thing she thought of was to start concrete projects which would have a direct and immediate impact on European citizens, especially young people. Taking into account the concerning rates of youth unemployment, she decided to launch her personal traineeship programme "PročBynNe?" - "Why not?". Putting effectively into use the business and academic network that she knows well from her previous profession, she offers around 12 traineeships per year to motivated young people to enable them to strive for their goals as well as to give them assurances that if they want to achieve something in life, they can do it. The selection of youngsters (aged 18–25) is not based on the highest qualifications but on the biggest motivation to do the job. The traineeships can vary from shadowing for two weeks the Minister of Finance to learning the best recipes of the top chef of the country or mentoring by master craftsmen. A separate website was launched introducing the project - www.procbyne.cz. A further idea is to bring this traineeship scheme from the Czech Republic to other EU countries – using a similar young person-MEP-business/academia formula. It is a symbolic act to help young people to get their first job experience and to show that even by small actions, we can make a difference.

== Publishing "The Little Prince" book in Czech and Moravian Dialects ==
She owns one of the largest collections of various language editions of "The Little Prince" in the world, currently numbering over 350 books, including editions in Braille and the 1943 French edition.

In addition to her collecting passion, she has initiated four retellings of this cult book into Czech and Moravian dialects. After editions in Hantec (Malé principál), Wallachian (Malučký princ), and Podkrkonošský dialect (Malej princ), the latest book edition in the dialect of the region Slovácko titled Malušenký princ was published in 2024, in collaboration with the publishing house JOTA.

== Other activities ==
- European Liberal Forum, Member of the Board of Directors

Dlabajová is an active member of the Rotary Club Zlín (its president 2013 - 2014. She was also a director of a public benefit corporation Zlinsky zamek. She is an avid reader and owns one of the largest collections of publication of the book The Little Prince in Central Europe.
