= Dita Charanzová =

Czech politician, consultant and former senior civil servant (born 1975)

Dita Charanzová MEP
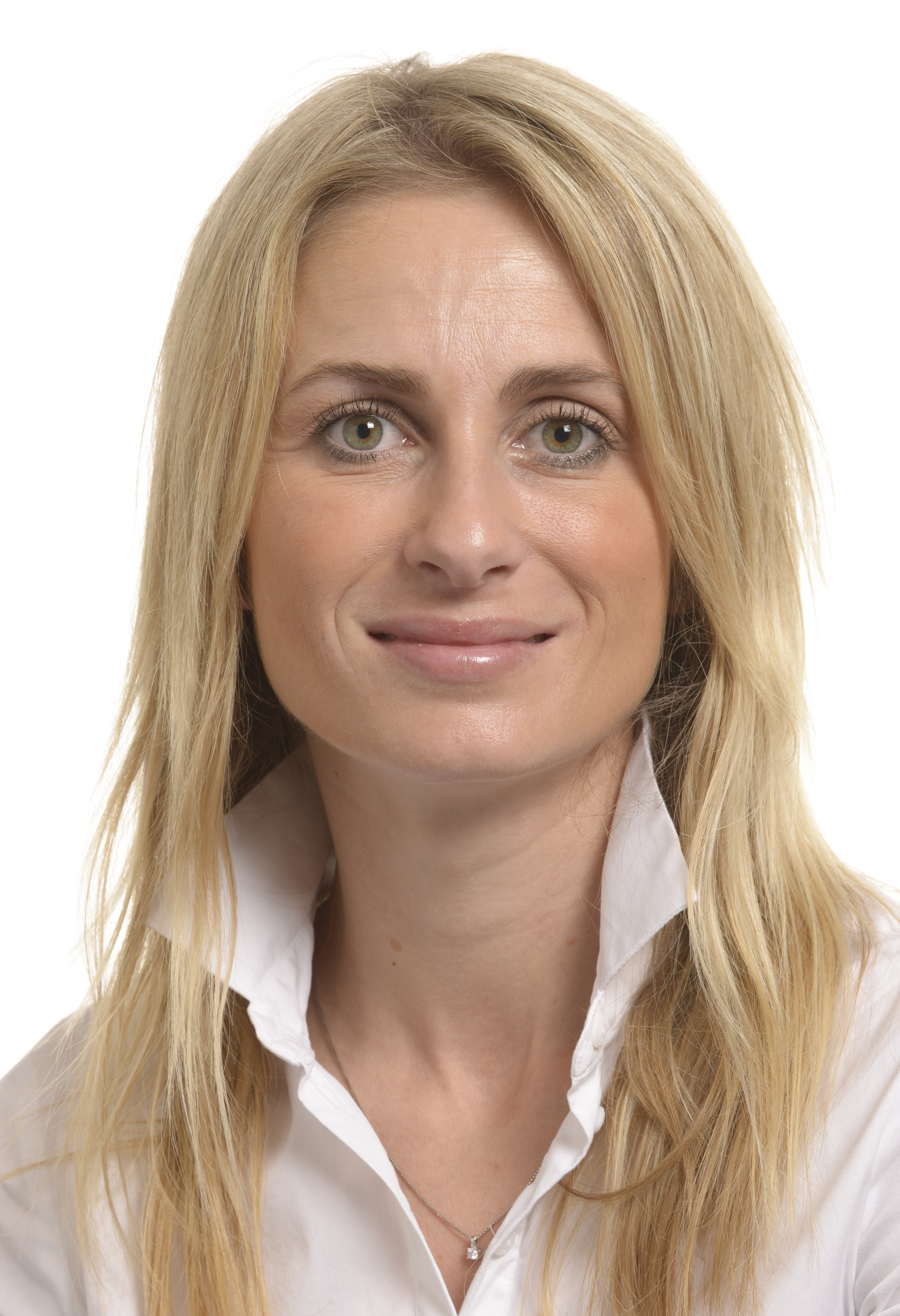

Vice President of the European Parliament
- In office 3 July 2019 – 15 July 2024 Serving with See List
- President: David Sassoli; Roberta Metsola

Member of the European Parliament for the Czech Republic
- In office 1 July 2014 – 16 July 2024

Personal details
- Born: 30 April 1975 (age 51) Prague, Czechoslovakia (now Czech Republic)
- Party: ANO 2011 (2014–2023)
- Children: 2
- Education: University of Economics in Prague; Diplomatic School of Spain

Dita Charanzová (born 30 April 1975) is a Czech politician, consultant and former senior civil servant, focusing on European Union issues. She was a Member of the European Parliament (MEP) from July 2014 to July 2024 and its vice-president from July 2019 to July 2024.

== Education and professional career ==
Dita Charanzová graduated from the University of Economics in Prague and from the Diplomatic School of Spain in Madrid. In 2001, she obtained a doctorate (Ph.D.) from the Faculty of International Relations at the University of Economics in Prague.

Charanzová worked in the diplomatic service of the Czech Republic for eight years, four of which she was posted in the Permanent Representation of the Czech Republic to the EU. During the Czech presidency of the EU in 2009, she chaired the Trade Policy Committee of the Council of the European Union. Between 2000 and 2001, she participated in an EU project which was focused on the reform of public governance in the Czech Republic.

Prior to entering politics, she worked in Strasbourg as a TV studio manager during the sessions of the Parliamentary Assembly of the Council of Europe.

== Political career ==
In 2014, Charanzová ran for the elections to the European Parliament as an independent (non-party) candidate on the 3rd place from the list of candidates for ANO 2011 and she was elected with a total number of 8,356 preferential votes (i.e. 3.41% of total votes).

She defended her mandate five years later when she led, as an independent, the list of the ANO movement. In the European Parliament elections in 2019, she obtained 53,924 preferential votes.

In July 2019, she was elected the vice president of the European Parliament. In January 2022, she was re-elected vice president for the second half of the European Parliament term.

Dita Charanzová is a member of Renew Europe, a political group in the European Parliament. She is the coordinator for Renew Europe in the Committee on the Internal Market and Consumer Protection (IMCO).

Charanzová focuses primarily on digital agenda, consumer protection, the internal market and international trade in the European Parliament.

She is well known for having a significant role in the negotiations on the Digital Services Act, the European Electronic Communications Code, the General Product Safety Regulation and the Web Accessibility Directive. Charanzová has also held numerous roles in relations to European automotive regulation.

As a vice-president of the European Parliament she is responsible for cybersecurity, relations with national parliaments, and parliamentary relations with North and South America. She is also chancellor of the European Parliament's annual European Citizen's Prize.

Dita Charanzová has been actively involved in child protection online. From 2018 until May 2023, she was elected and served as the vice president of the Alliance of Liberals and Democrats for Europe (ALDE) party, a European Political party.

In June 2023, she stated that she would not be running for the European Parliament elections in 2024 under the ANO movement. She stated her disagreement with the conservative and nationalist direction of the ANO Movement as the reason.

== Other activities ==
- European Council on Foreign Relations (ECFR), Member
- Board of directors of the Aspen Institute, Member
- Board of Trustees, World Law Foundation

== Recognition and awards ==
In 2019, she received an award from the European Emergency Number Association (EENA) for introducing into EU legislation, a mandatory "Reverse 112" system (a public warning system for mobile phones).

She was also commended by European consumer associations for successfully introducing into EU legislation, a cap on price of "intra-EU calls" (long-distance surcharges between European countries) and thus reducing the cost of prices for consumers in the European Union.

Charanzová has been awarded the "MEP Award" three times (2023, 2020, 2016) for her activity in the internal market, consumer protection and in the field of human rights.

In 2016, Charanzová received the "New Europe 100". In 2017, Politico listed Charanzová as one of the 41 most influential MEPs. In the same year, Politico also ranked her among the top 20 women who shape Brussels, and she was placed in the same ranking in 2018 and 2020.

In 2023, the EU Matrix server declared her the sixth most influential Member of the European Parliament out of all 705 members.

== Personal life ==
Charanzová has two daughters. She speaks fluent English, French, Spanish and Russian.

== Publications ==
Charanzová is the author of various publications that deal with European issues. These include:

- Charanzová, Dita. Surovinové strategie Evropské unie: globální a domácí výzvy.
- Charanzová, Dita. Salvador de Madariaga. Velcí Evropané.
