= Czech Republic (European Parliament constituency) =

Constituency of the European Parliament

- European Parliament constituency
- Location among the current constituencies
- Member state: Czech Republic
- Created: 2004
- MEPs: 24 (2004–2009); 22 (2009–2014); 21 (2014–present)

The Czech Republic is a European Parliament constituency for elections in the European Union covering the member state of Czech Republic. It is currently represented by twenty-one Members of the European Parliament.

== Elections ==
=== 2004 ===
The 2004 European election was the sixth election to the European Parliament. However, as the Czech Republic had only joined the European Union earlier that month, it was the first election European election held in that state.

On a very low turnout, the ruling Czech Social Democratic Party suffered a heavy defeat, losing ground to both the conservative Civic Democratic Party and the Communist Party of Bohemia and Moravia. Debacle of his party was one of reasons for resignation of Prime Minister Vladimír Špidla. Full results;

=== 2009 ===
The 2009 European election was the seventh election to the European Parliament and the second for the Czech Republic.

=== 2014 ===
The 2014 European election was the eighth election to the European Parliament and the third for the Czech Republic.

=== 2019 ===
The 2019 European election was the ninth election to the European Parliament and the fourth for the Czech Republic.

=== 2024 ===
The 2024 European election was the tenth election to the European Parliament and the fifth for the Czech Republic.
