= 2019 European Parliament election in the Czech Republic =

- 24–25 May 2019

All 21 Czech seats in the European Parliament
- Turnout: 28.71% (▲10.52pp)
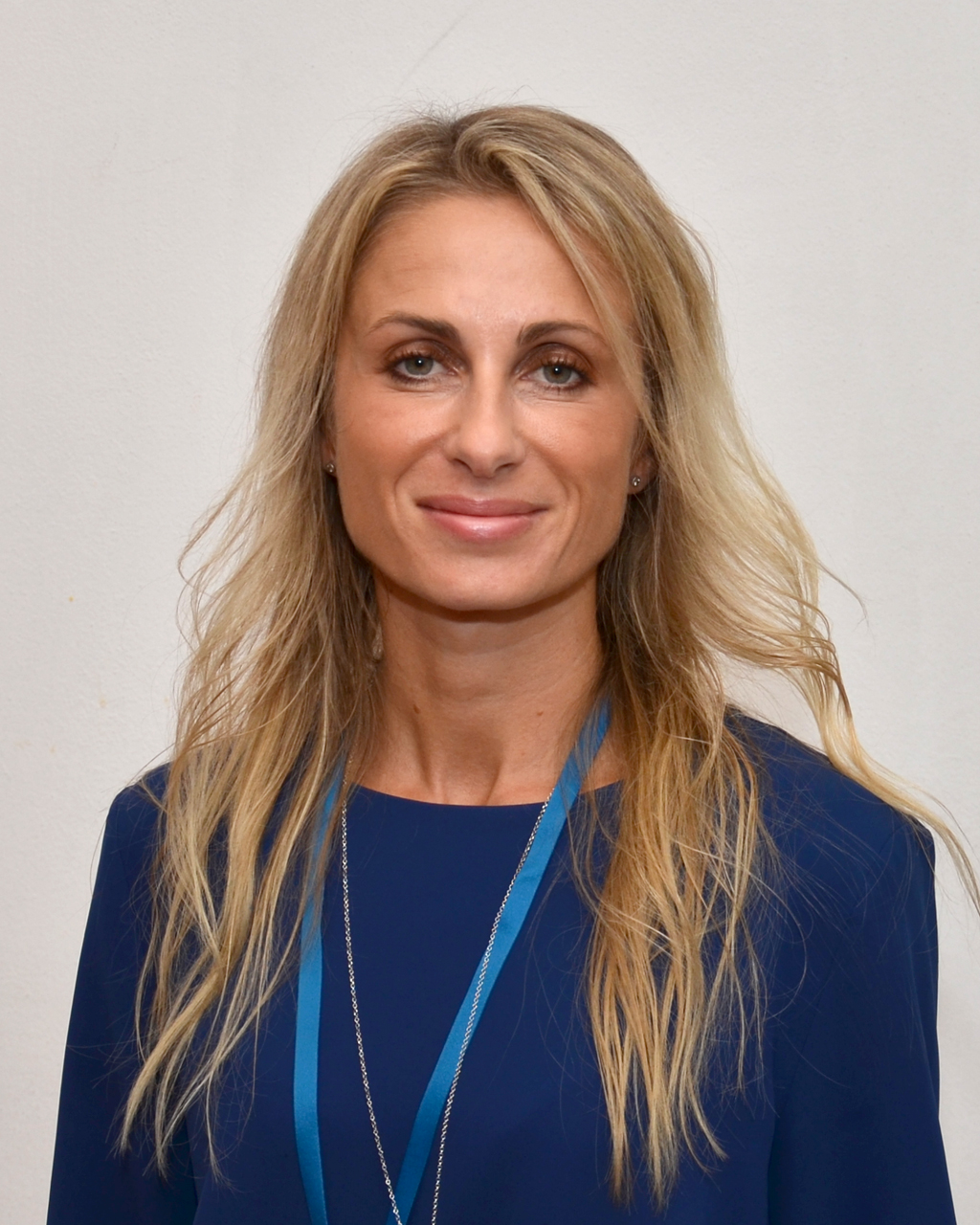

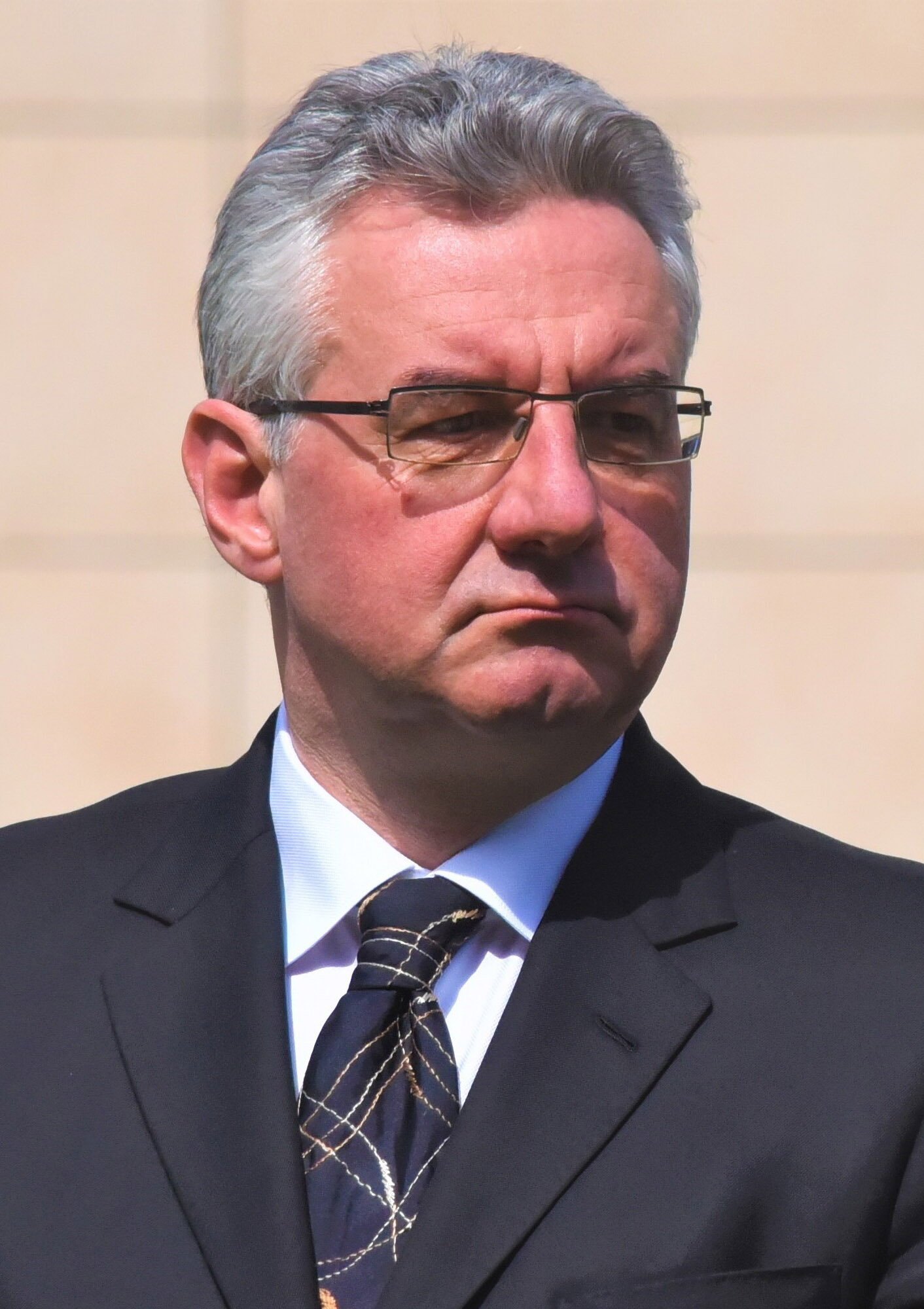

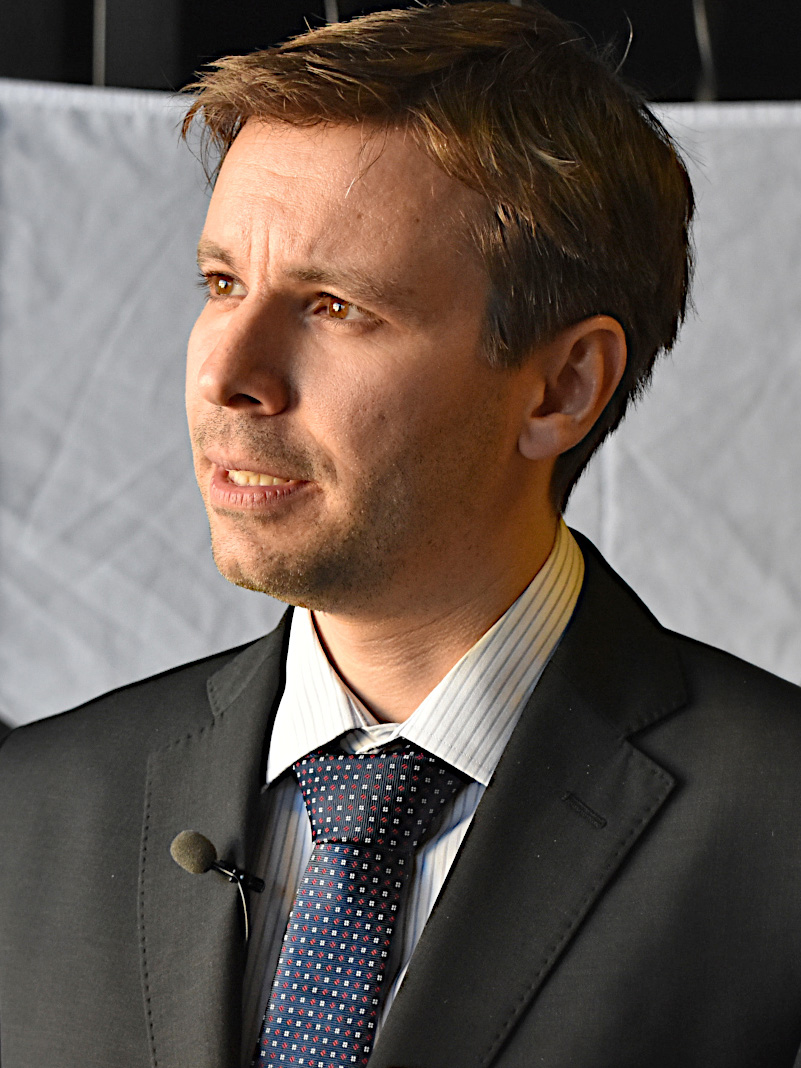

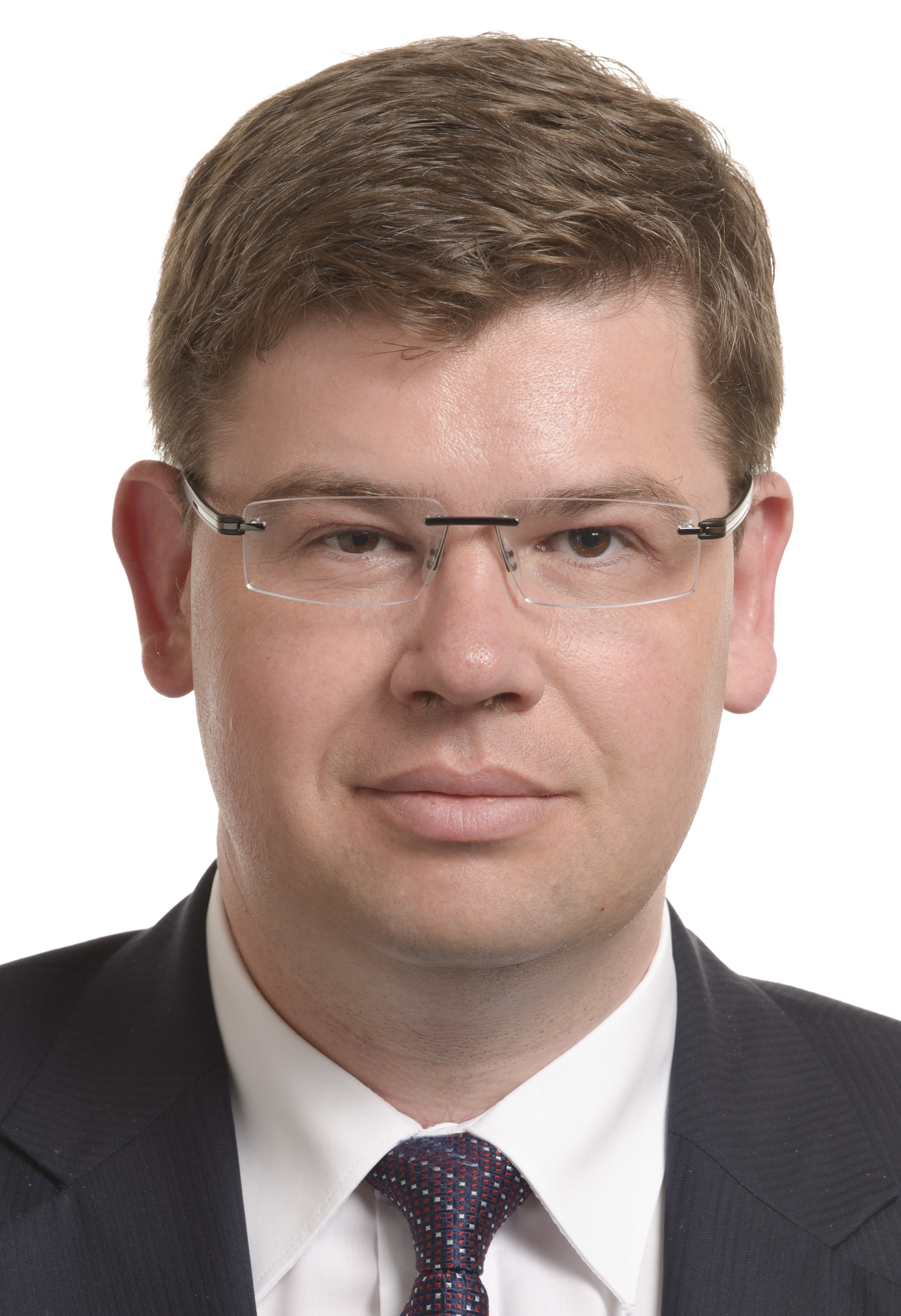

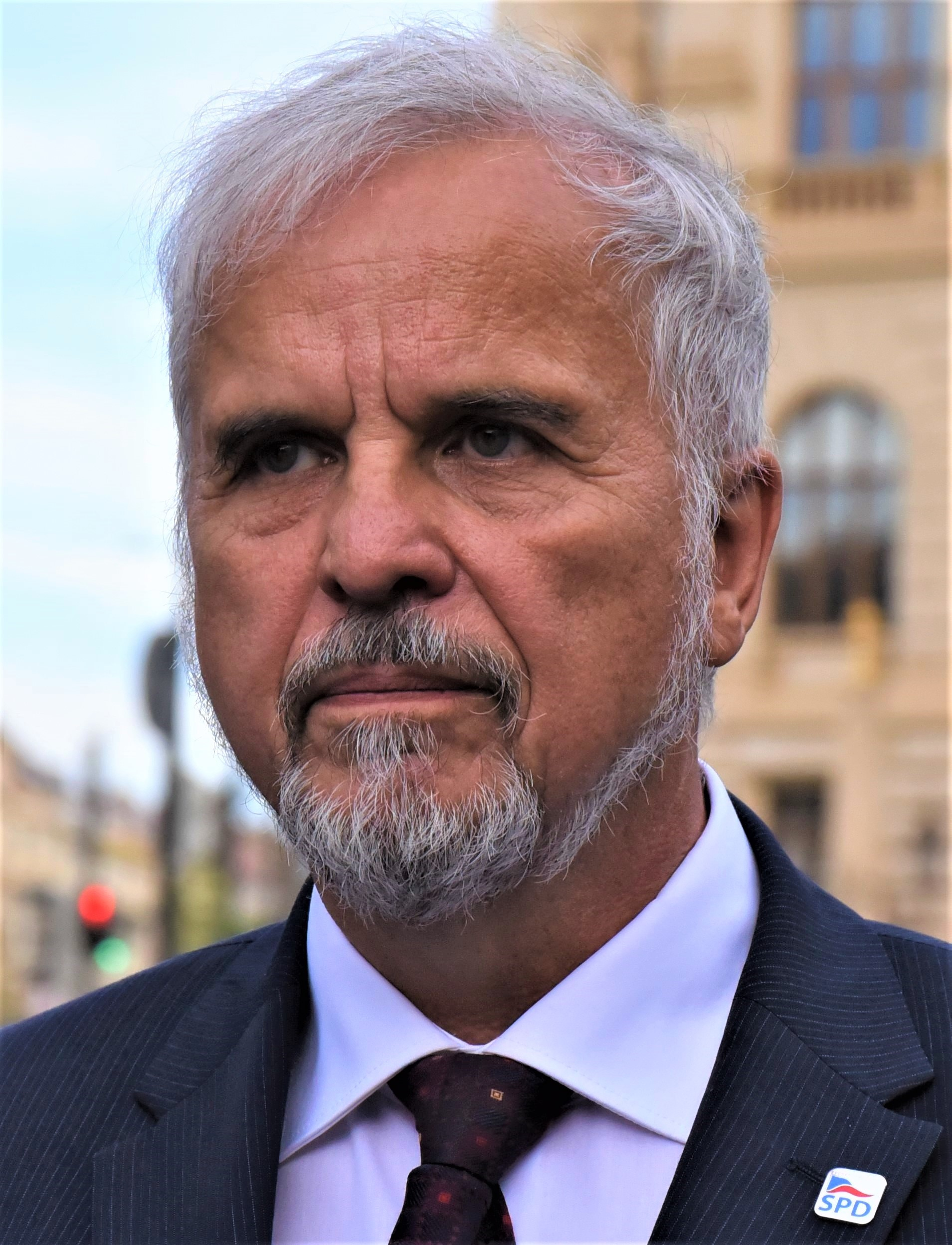

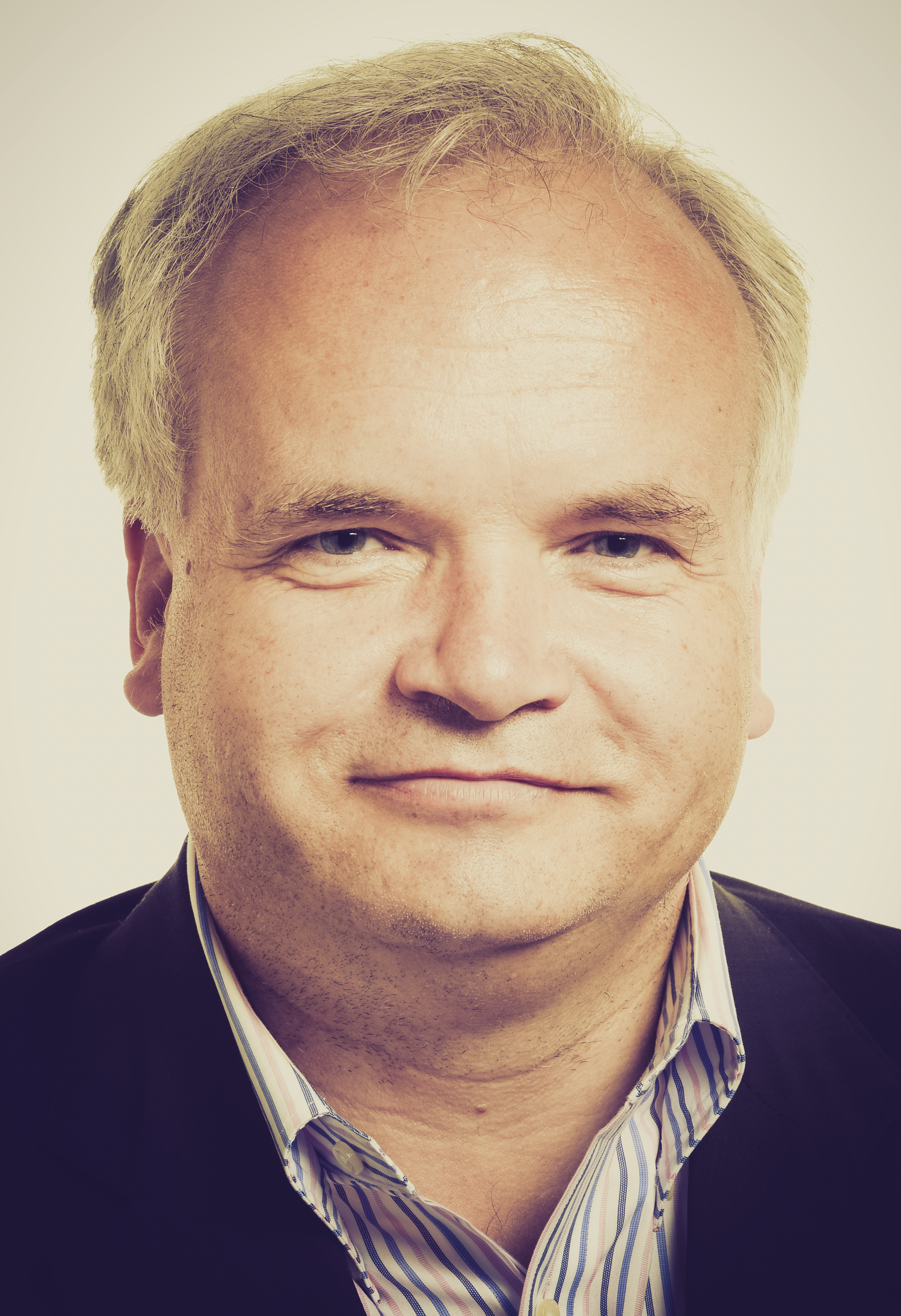

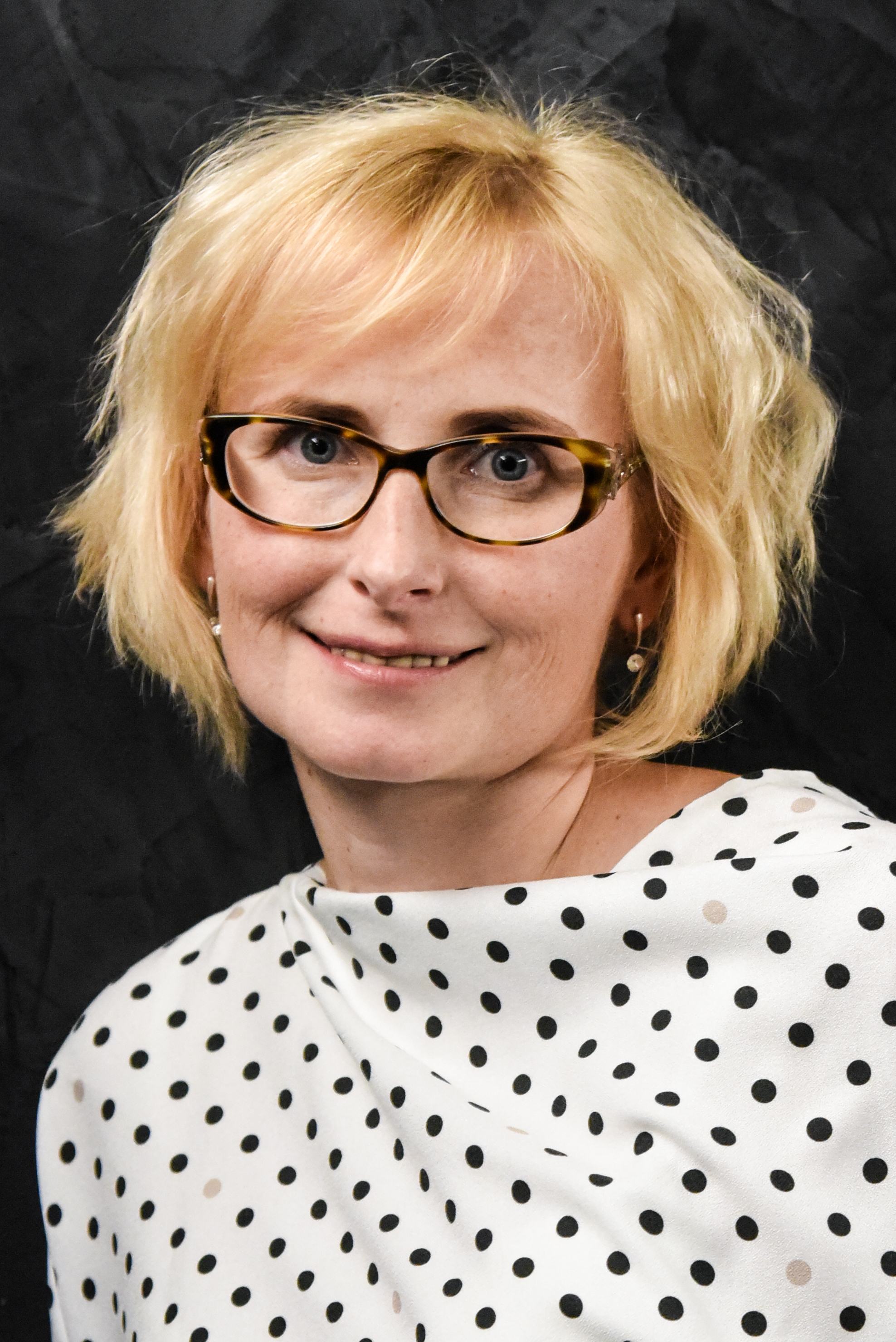
	First party	Second party	Third party
Leader	Dita Charanzová	Jan Zahradil	Marcel Kolaja
Party	ANO	ODS	Pirates
Alliance	ALDE	ECR	PPEU
Last election	16.13%, 4 seats	7.68%, 2 seats	4.78%, 0 seats
Seats won	6	4	3
Seat change	▲2	▲2	▲3
Popular vote	502,343	344,885	330,844
Percentage	21.19%	14.55%	13.96%
Swing	▲5.06pp	▲6.87pp	▲9.18pp
	Fourth party	Fifth party	Sixth party
Leader	Jiří Pospíšil	Ivan David	Pavel Svoboda
Party	TOP 09	SPD	KDU-ČSL
Alliance	EPP	MENF	EPP
Last election	15.95%, 4 seats	–	9.95%, 3 seats
Seats won	3	2	2
Seat change	▼1	New	▼1
Popular vote	276,220	216,718	171,723
Percentage	11.65%	9.14%	7.24%
Swing	▼4.30pp	New	▼2.71pp
	Seventh party
Leader	Kateřina Konečná
Party	KSČM
Alliance	GUE/NGL
Last election	10.99%, 3 seats
Seats won	1
Seat change	▼2
Popular vote	164,624
Percentage	6.94%
Swing	▼4.05pp

The 2019 European Parliament election in the Czech Republic was held on 24 and 25 May 2019, electing the 21 members of the Czech delegation to the European Parliament as part of the European elections held across the European Union.

The result was a victory of the populist ruling party ANO (ALDE), with 21.18 per cent and 6 seats, 2 more seats than in 2014 election. Followed by conservative ODS (ECR), with 14.54 per cent and 4 seats, marking a notable growth in the election. The Pirate Party also made major gains. SPD (ENF) gained seats in its first European election, while KDU-ČSL (EPP), TOP 09/STAN (EPP) and KSČM (GUE/NGL) lost seats. ČSSD (S&D) did not cross 5% threshold for the first time, as well as Svobodní (EFDD).

== Background ==
Previous election was held in 2014. ANO 2011 has won the previous election followed by TOP 09. Civic Democratic Party has suffered losses and Czech Social Democratic Party had disappointing result.

Christian and Democratic Union – Czechoslovak People's Party announced on 19 May 2018 that it will be led by MEP Pavel Svoboda during 2019 election. Christian Democrats admitted to consider joint list with TOP 09 and Mayors and Independents. Christian Democrats announced on 28 November 2018 the will run independently.

Jan Zahradil became Alliance of Conservatives and Reformists in Europe candidate for the President of the European Commission and thus the election leader of Civic Democratic Party. Zahradil launched pan-European campaign of Alliance of Conservatives and Reformists in Europe on 28 November 2018. Zahradil stated that his Zahradil was confirmed as party's election leader on 10 December 2018. In national election polls, which use similar system (the only difference being national candidate list compared to regional for national elections), ODS polls at second place with 14-16%, which would give them 4 MEP's.

Czech Social Democratic Party announced Pavel Poc as the leading candidate of the party on 30 November 2018. Josef Středula was reportedly offered the position but refused it. Poc was confirmed as electoral leader on 27 January 2019.

Mayors and Independents announced on 7 December 2018 that Stanislav Polčák will be party's election leader. The party stated they negotiate with TOP 09, SNK European Democrats and Liberal-Environmental Party about joint list for the election.

Czech Pirate Party launched its primaries for the election on 10 December 2018. Mikuláš Peksa expressed his intention to become electoral leader of the party and entered the primaries. He was eventually defeated by Marcel Kolaja who became party's electoral leader on 19 January 2019.

Communist Party of Bohemia and Moravia chose Kateřina Konečná as the electoral leader on 15 December 2018.

TOP 09 announced its leader Jiří Pospíšil as the electoral leader on 25 January 2019.

== Parties ==
Name	Main candidate	Ideology	2014 result		Seats (April 2019)
Name	Main candidate	Ideology	Votes (%)	Seats	Seats (April 2019)
ANO (ALDE)	Dita Charanzová	Conservative liberalism	16.1%	4 / 21	2 / 21
STAN & TOP 09 • Mayors and Independents • TOP 09 (EPP) • Green Party (EGP) • Liberal-Environmental Party	Jiří Pospíšil	Liberal conservatism	20.2%	4 / 21	3 / 21
ČSSD (PES)	Pavel Poc	Social democracy	14.2%	4 / 21	4 / 21
KSČM • Party of Democratic Socialism (PEL) • Communist Party of Czechoslovakia	Kateřina Konečná	Communism	11.0%	3 / 21	3 / 21
KDU-ČSL (EPP) • SNK European Democrats • The Czech Crown (Monarchist Party of Bohemia, Moravia and Silesia) • Conservative Party • Nonpartisans (political party)	Pavel Svoboda	Christian democracy	9.9%	3 / 21	3 / 21
ODS (ACRE)	Jan Zahradil	Conservatism	7.7%	2 / 21	2 / 21
Svobodní (ADDE) • Happy Czechia	Vít Jedlička	Libertarian conservatism	5.2%	1 / 21	1 / 21
Pirates (PPEU)	Marcel Kolaja	Pirate politics	14.0%	0 / 21	0 / 21
SPD (MENF)	Ivan David	Right-wing populism	New	0 / 21	0 / 21
Right Bloc	Petr Cibulka	Right-wing populism	0.5%	0 / 21	0 / 21
ESO	Jaromír Štětina	Liberal conservatism	New	0 / 21	1 / 21
SNČR	František Matějka	Euroscepticism	New	0 / 21	0 / 21
ND • Party of Common Sense	Adam B. Bartoš	Ultranationalism	0.5%	0 / 21	0 / 21
ČS • Bloc Against Islamization – Defence of the Homeland	David Rath	Social patriotism	0.1%	0 / 21	0 / 21
DSSS (APF) • Clean Ústí • National Front	Tomáš Vandas	Neo-Nazism	0.5%	0 / 21	0 / 21
ADS	Pavel Šrámek	Agrarianism	New	0 / 21	0 / 21
MZH (EFA)	Vladan Ševčík	Autonomism	New	0 / 21	0 / 21
Voice • Tábor 2020	Pavel Telička	Liberalism	New	0 / 21	2 / 21

== Campaign ==
=== ANO 2011 ===
Dita Charanzová was introduced as the electoral leader of ANO 2011 on 17 February 2019.

The party launched its campaign on 2 May 2019. It uses the slogan "We will protect Czech strongly and without compromises." The party introduced baseball caps with the slogan "Strong Czechia" which is inspired by Donald Trump's 2016 presidential campaign. Charanzová promised strong Czechia in a strong Europe, fighting against illegal migration and fighting against low quality grocery.

ANO 2011 used Gamekeepers's exhibition Natura Viva. Prime Minister Andrej Babiš and Minister of Environment attended party's meeting there along with Dita Charanzová

ANO 2011 concluded itc campaign on 23 May when Dita CHaranzová was doing contact campaign and handing out Doughnut to potential voters.

=== Christian and Democratic Union - Czechoslovak People's Party (KDU-ČSL) ===
KDU-ČSL concluded campaign on 23 May when its candidates met with party's supporters at Anděl to sing Ode to Joy.

=== Civic Democratic Party (ODS) ===
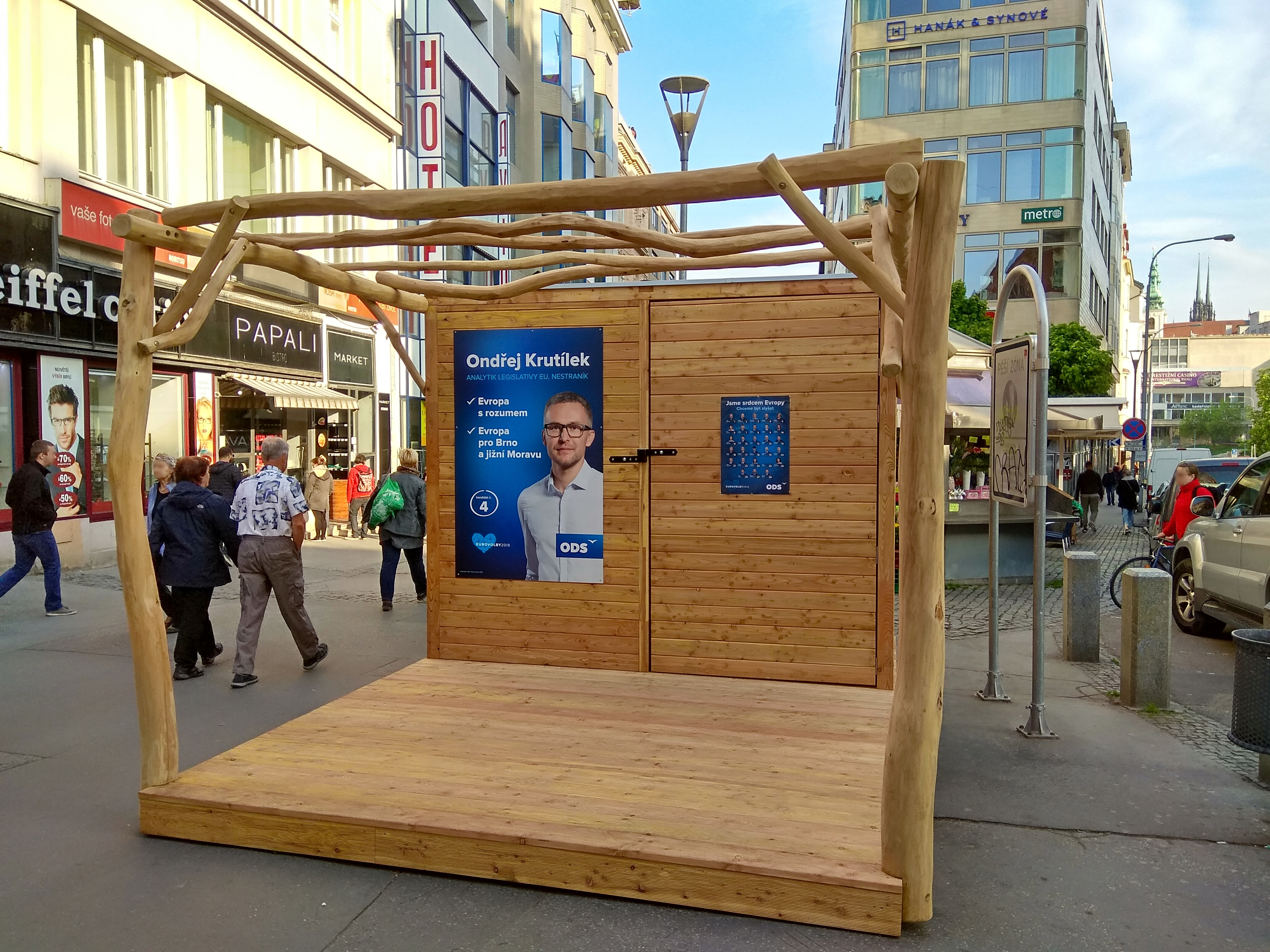
ODS election stand in Brno

The Civic Democratic Party is led by Jan Zahradil. The list of candidates was announced on 21 January 2018. It includes, besides Zahradil, MEP Evžen Tošenovský, former Minister of Defense Alexandr Vondra, MP Veronika Vrecionová and others. The party is a member of the Alliance of Conservatives and Reformists in Europe. Zahradil is a leading candidate of the European Conservatives and Reformists group. The party focuses on reform of the European Union.

The party introduced its election slogan "We are the Heart of Europe and we want to be heard" on 16 March 2019.

ODS launched its campaign during a meeting on 2 May 2019. Zahradil stated that the party aims for a less bureaucratic and more flexible Europe. Petr Fiala, leader of ODS, stated that the party plans to support safe outer borders of the European Union, open borders within the European Union and free trade without "useless regulations". He also promised large-scale legal cleaning of European law.

Zahradil reacted to the campaign of ANO 2011 that was launched on 2 May 2019. He noted that ODS previously used the slogan "Strong Czechia" during the campaign for the 2017 legislative election. He also stated that ANO 2011 copied the election program of ODS.

ODS released a campaign advertisement on 12 May 2019. It reminds voters of previous and current scandals of Andrej Babiš.

Civic Democratic Party concluded campaign on 24 May when Jan Zahradil was doing contact campaign along with supporters of the party and was handing out leaflets to voters.

=== Czech Social Democratic Party (ČSSD) ===
Social Democrats chose Pavel Poc as the electoral leader. The party launched its campaign on 23 April 2019. It focuses on the fight against poor-quality grocery.

=== Czech Pirate Party ===
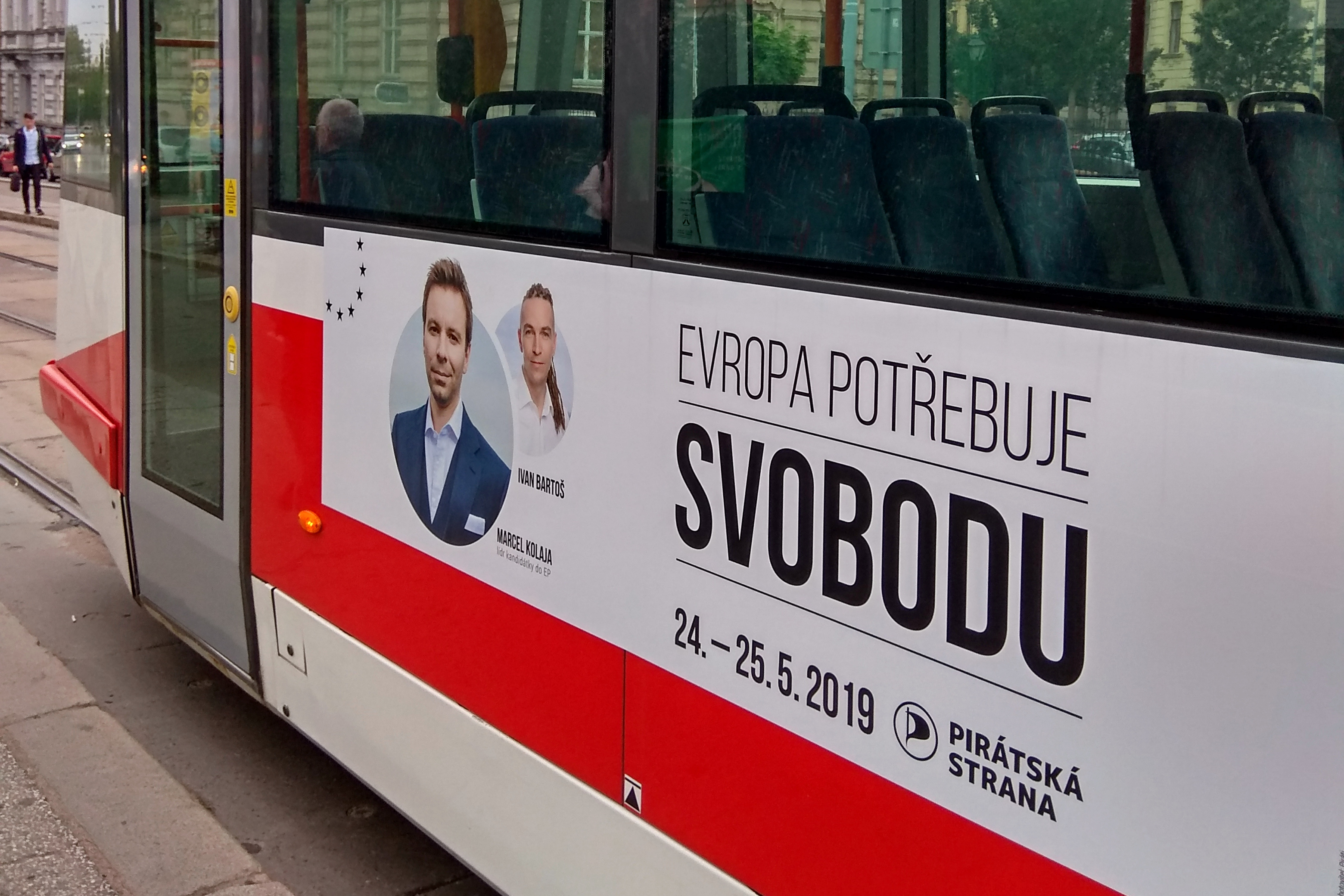
Pirate Party election Banner

The Pirates are led by Marcel Kolaja. The party is not currently represented in the European Parliament. Kolaja stated that it could join Alliance of Liberals and Democrats for Europe group or Greens–European Free Alliance group after the election. The party launched its campaign on 3 March 2019.

Pirates launched their campaign on 29 April 2019 with a petition against Andrej Babiš. The party's campaign utilises the slogan "Europe needs Pirates."

Pirate Party used a virtual reality workshop during its campaign. Printed Pirate Newspapers included a virtual image of Ivan Bartoš, visible when someone aims their mobile phone camera at title page of Pirate Newspapers. The Pirate Party also published so-called Peksaso (named after Mikuláš Peksa) which is a pexeso whose pictures are based on the election program of the Pirates.

Pirates held a meeting with voters at Havlíčkův Brod square on 19 May 2019 where they build an Election Town. There were attractions for people such as Musical performance or bouncy castle for children. Marcel Kolaja called people to vote as the election is important. Pirates also decided to hold a meeting in Olomouc. One of main planned attractions were ponies as a ride for children. Electoral leader Marcel Kolaja disagreed with ponies as he viewed it as an animal abuse which resulted in a party's election whether party members want the pony even at the cost of not having Kolaja at the meeting. Pirates eventually voted they prefer Ponies.

Pirates concluded campaign on 24 May when party's leader Ivan Bartoš was driving through the Prague by a bus with DJ Music.

=== Freedom and Direct Democracy (SPD) ===
The Freedom and Direct Democracy is running for the first time in a European parliament election. They are with Movement for a Europe of Nations and Freedom. The party launched its campaign on 25 April 2019.

=== Svobodní ===
Svobodní launched campaign on 20 April 2019. Vít Jedlička was announced as its leader. The party is running with support of Joyful Czech Republic. The party's campaign is somewhat less Eurosceptic than in previous years. The party wants to focus on the reform of the European Union. Jedlička stated that Svobodní wants the Czech Republic to remain in the European Union and would support exit from the European Union only if reform does not occur.

On 11 May 2016 Svobodní began its election campaign. Its party members and supporters started printing electoral newspapers.

Svobodní decided to finance its campaign through crowdfunding on the website HitHit. Their target is 350,000 CZK.

=== STAN and TOP 09 ===
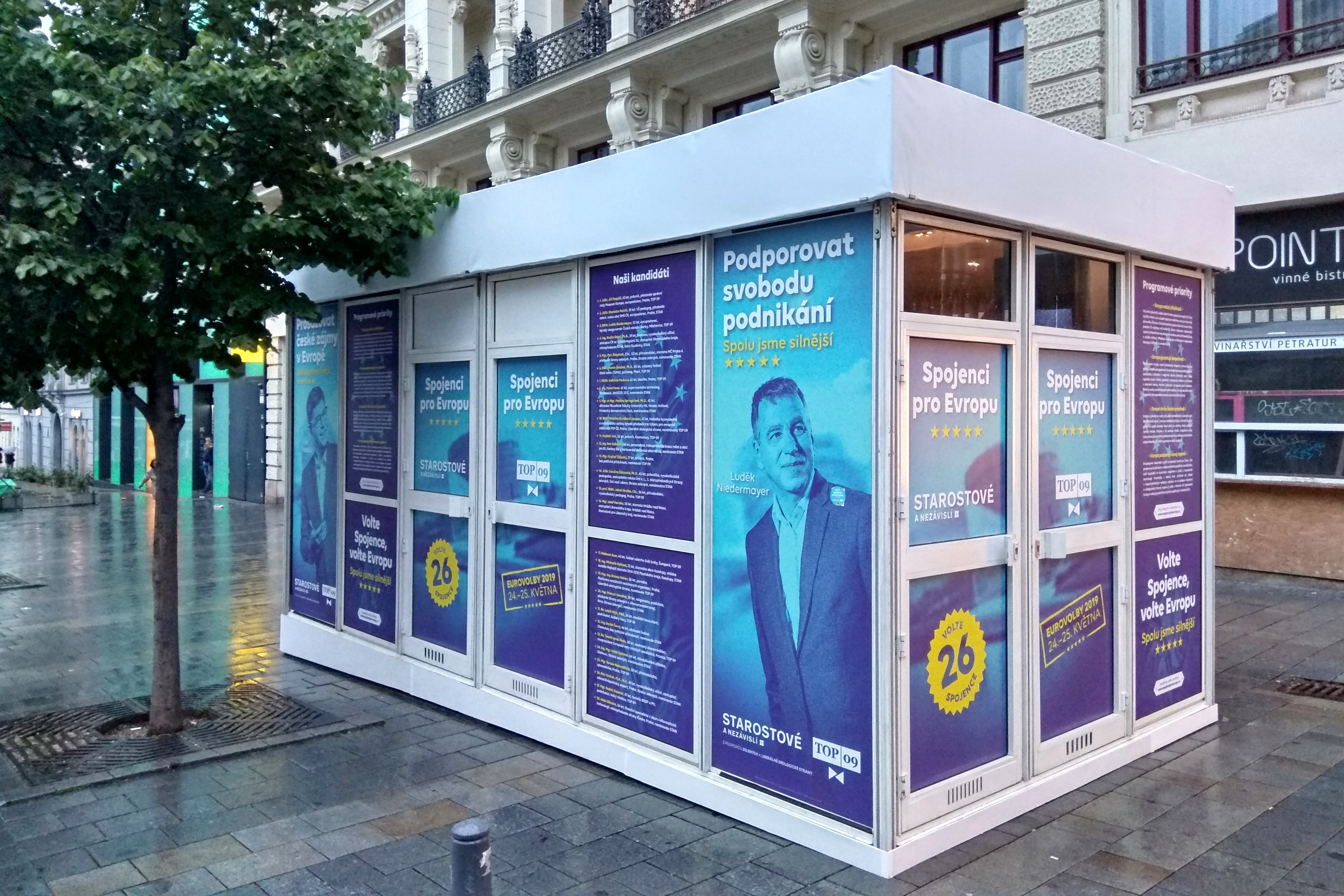
STAN and TOP 09 banner in Brno.

On 25 January 2019 was Jiří Pospíšil, leader of the TOP 09 party, announced as the electoral leader of the coalition. In addition to Jiří Pospíšil (TOP 09), the candidate list includes Stanislav Polčák (STAN), MEP Luděk Niedermayer (TOP 09), Marek Ženíšek (TOP 09) and others. All elected members of the European Parliament would be in the European People's Party group.

In January 2019 TOP 09 had announced its desire to negotiate with the political movement Mayors and Independents (STAN) about a joint candidate list for the European Parliament election in 2019. Mayors and Independents party itself had previously announced an agreement of a cooperation with the Green party and numerous regional subjects in the European Parliament election. On 18 February 2019 both party leaders, Petr Gazdík (STAN) and Jiří Pospíšil (TOP 09), signed an agreement on cooperation in the European Parliament election. The assembled coalition was targeting European Union supporters.

The party's MEP Luděk Niedermayer launched a website called My Europe to support European Union by retelling real experiences and stories of Bohemian, Moravian and Silesian citizens, who feel like European citizens at the same time. The campaign aims to inform civil society about the European Union without a political context.

TOP 09 and Mayors and Independents coalition made a campaign commercial inspired by the iconic film Cosy Dens. The commercial quickly went viral on social networks. The campaign was aimed at pro-European voters.

== Debates ==
2019 European Parliament election in the Czech Republic debates
Date	Organisers	P Present A Absent									
Date	Organisers	ANO	ODS	Pirates	SPD	ČSSD	KSČM	TOP 09	STAN	KDU–ČSL	Hlas
15 May	Seznam zprávy	P Dita Charanzová	P Evžen Tošenovský	P Marcel Kolaja	A	P Pavel Poc	A	A	A	A	A
21 May	Association for International Affairs	P Dita Charanzová	P Jan Zahradil	P Marcel Kolaja	P Ivan David	A	P Kateřina Konečná	A	P Stanislav Polčák	P Pavel Svoboda	P Pavel Telička
23 May	Česká televize	P Andrej Babiš	P Petr Fiala	P Ivan Bartoš	P Tomio Okamura	P Jan Hamáček	P Vojtěch Filip	P Jiří Pospíšil	P Vít Rakušan	P Marek Výborný	A
24 May	Český rozhlas	P Dita Charanzová	P Jan Zahradil	P Marcel Kolaja	P Ivan David	P Pavel Poc	P Arťom Korjagin	P Jiří Pospíšil	A	P Pavel Svoboda	A

== Opinion polls ==
=== Vote share ===
Date	Polling Firm	Turnout	ANO ALDE	TOP 09+STAN EPP	ČSSD S&D	KSČM GUE/NGL	KDU-ČSL EPP	ODS ECR	SVOBODNÍ EFDD	PIRÁTI Greens/EFA	Zelení Greens/EFA	SPD ENF	Voice ALDE	Soukromníci NI
24–25 May 2019	Election result	28.7	21.18	11.65	3.95	6.94	7.24	14.54	0.65	13.95	(Note: With TOP 09 and STAN)	9.14	3.23	0.36
20 May 2019	Poll Aggregation by Politico		21.74	10.41	6.25	6.94	6.27	12.35	—N/a	15.38		11.14	—N/a	—N/a
29 Mar - 3 May 2019	STEM/Mark		20.0	12.0	6.0	7.0	6.0	11.0	—N/a	16.0		14.0	4.0	—N/a
16 Mar - 3 May 2019	Median	15.0	21.7	11.3	5.0	5.5	9.4	14.2	3.0	14.7		8.8	—N/a	—N/a
16 Mar - 3 May 2019	Median	20.0	22.6	10.5	5.4	5.2	8.3	14.0	3.1	14.7		9.5	—N/a	—N/a
16 Mar - 3 May 2019	Median	25.0	24.0	9.7	5.7	6.0	7.8	14.0	3.1	13.6		9.8	—N/a	—N/a
16 Mar - 3 May 2019	Median	30.0	25.1	9.3	5.8	6.3	7.5	13.4	3.4	13.5		9.4	—N/a	—N/a
16 Mar - 3 May 2019	Median	35.0	25.2	8.7	6.2	6.3	7.1	13.0	3.5	14.4		9.1	—N/a	—N/a
30 Mar - 10 Apr 2019	CVVM	27.0	28.0	5.0	8.5	10.0	4.0	12.0	—N/a	10.5		5.0	—N/a	—N/a
21 Mar - 4 Apr 2019	Phoenix Research	24.0	18.2	6.9	8.7	6.7	5.3	15.4	—N/a	21.2		4.0	—N/a	1.3
29 Mar 2019	Poll aggregation by the European Parliament (Note: "Priority is always given to surveys on European election voting intentions. When such surveys are not available, national voting intentions polls are used for the projections")		30.4	8.8	8.8	9.4	4.1	18.7	—N/a	13.5		5.3	—N/a	—N/a
18 Feb 2019	Poll aggregation by the European Parliament		30.5	3.8+3.8	10.8	8.5	4.8	14.3	1.3	14.3	1.3	6.3	—N/a	—N/a
2 - 13 Feb 2019	CVVM	28.0	26.0	7.5	7.5	8.0	3.5	16.0	—N/a	11.5		4.5	—N/a	—N/a
13 Dec 2018	Poll aggregation by the European Parliament		32.6	10.0	6.4	6.9	5.0	14.0	1.5	15.0	0.7	7.5	—N/a	—N/a
24 - 25 May 2014	2014 Election	18.2	16.1	16.0	14.2	11.0	10.0	7.7	5.2	4.8	3.8	—N/a	—N/a	—N/a

=== Seats ===
Date	Polling Firm	ANO ALDE	TOP 09+STAN EPP	ČSSD S&D	KSČM GUE/NGL	KDU-ČSL EPP	ODS ECR	SVOBODNÍ EFDD	PIRÁTI Greens/EFA	Zelení Greens/EFA	SPD ENF
30 Mar - 10 Apr 2019	CVVM	9	1	2	2	0	4	—N/a	2		1
29 Mar 2019	Poll aggregation by the European Parliament	7	2	2	2	0	4	—N/a	3		1
1 Mar 2019	Poll aggregation by the European Parliament	8	0	2	2	1	3	0	4	0	1
18 Feb 2019	Poll aggregation by the European Parliament	8	0	3	2	0	4	0	3	0	1
2 - 13 Feb 2019	CVVM	9	1	1	2	0	5	0	3	0	0
24 - 25 May 2014	2014 Election	4	4	4	3	3	2	1	0	0	0

== Results ==
Party	Votes	%	Seats	+/–
ANO 2011	502,343	21.19	6	+2
Civic Democratic Party	344,885	14.55	4	+2
Czech Pirate Party	330,844	13.96	3	+3
TOP 09–STAN	276,220	11.65	3	–1
Freedom and Direct Democracy	216,718	9.14	2	New
KDU-ČSL	171,723	7.24	2	–1
Communist Party of Bohemia and Moravia	164,624	6.94	1	–2
Czech Social Democratic Party	93,664	3.95	0	–4
Hlas	56,449	2.38	0	New
Yes, We Will Troll the Euro-Parliament	37,046	1.56	0	New
Scientists for the Czech Republic	19,492	0.82	0	New
National Democracy–Party of Common Sense	18,715	0.79	0	0
Svobodní–Happy Czechia	15,492	0.65	0	–1
Democratic Party of Greens	14,339	0.60	0	New
Europe Together	12,587	0.53	0	New
Alternative for the Czech Republic 2017	11,729	0.49	0	New
Independence Party of the Czech Republic	9,676	0.41	0	New
Freeholder Party of the Czech Republic	8,720	0.37	0	New
Path of Responsible Society	7,890	0.33	0	New
For Health and Sport	7,868	0.33	0	New
Moravané	6,599	0.28	0	0
Right Bloc	4,752	0.20	0	0
Workers' Party of Social Justice	4,363	0.18	0	0
SPR–RSČ	4,284	0.18	0	New
Agrarian Democratic Party	4,004	0.17	0	New
Moravian Land Movement	3,195	0.13	0	New
For Czechia	2,760	0.12	0	New
Czech Sovereignty	2,609	0.11	0	0
Security, Responsibility, Solidarity	2,583	0.11	0	New
Club of Committed Non-Party Members	2,580	0.11	0	0
Ne-Volim.cz	2,221	0.09	0	New
Alliance of National Forces	1,971	0.08	0	New
Your Candidate	1,653	0.07	0	New
Roma Democratic Party	1,651	0.07	0	0
National Socialists	1,312	0.06	0	0
Patriots for Neutrality	1,289	0.05	0	New
First Republic	844	0.04	0	New
Are you For? Confidence Solidarity Investing for the Future	836	0.04	0	New
Conservative Alternative	235	0.01	0	New
Total	2,370,765	100.00	21	0
Valid votes	2,370,765	99.30		
Invalid/blank votes	16,613	0.70		
Total votes	2,387,378	100.00		
Registered voters/turnout	8,316,737	28.71		
Source: Volby

=== European groups ===
Party	Seats	+/–
Renew Europe	6	+2
European People's Party	5	–2
European Conservatives and Reformists	4	+2
Greens–European Free Alliance	3	+3
Identity and Democracy	2	+2
European United Left–Nordic Green Left	1	–2
Progressive Alliance of Socialists and Democrats	0	–4
Europe of Freedom and Direct Democracy	0	–1
Total	21	0

=== Elected MEPs ===
Members of the European Parliament for the Czech Republic
Observers	(2003)
Delegation	(2004)
6th term	(2004)
7th term	(2009)
8th term	(2014)
9th term	(2019)
10th term	(2024)

Num	MEP	Gender	Party	EP Group	Period	Pref. Votes
1.	Luděk Niedermayer	Male	TOP 09	EPP		67,430
2.	Dita Charanzová	Female	ANO	RE		53,924
3.	Jan Zahradil	Male	ODS	ECR		51,381
4.	Hynek Blaško	Male	SPD	ID		47,505
5.	Kateřina Konečná	Female	KSČM	GUE/NGL		38,650
6.	Jiří Pospíšil	Male	TOP 09	EPP		37,231
7.	Ivan David	Male	SPD	ID		33,055
8.	Martina Dlabajová	Female	ANO	RE		31,401
9.	Alexandr Vondra	Male	ODS	ECR		29,536
10.	Evžen Tošenovský	Male	ODS	ECR		25,644
11.	Stanislav Polčák	Male	STAN	EPP		25,352
12.	Tomáš Zdechovský	Male	KDU–ČSL	EPP		24,823
13.	Michaela Šojdrová	Female	KDU–ČSL	EPP		22,649
14.	Marcel Kolaja	Male	Pirates	Greens-EFA		15,398
15.	Markéta Gregorová	Female	Pirates	Greens-EFA		14,158
16.	Radka Maxová	Female	ANO	RE		11,286
17.	Mikuláš Peksa	Male	Pirates	Greens-EFA		9,594
18.	Veronika Vrecionová	Female	ODS	ECR		8,460
19.	Ondřej Kovařík	Male	ANO	RE		6,867
20.	Martin Hlaváček	Male	ANO	RE		5,948
21.	Ondřej Knotek	Male	ANO	RE		3,798
