= 2014 European Parliament election in the Czech Republic =

- 23–24 May 2014

21 seats in the European Parliament
- Turnout: 18.19% (▼10.03pp)
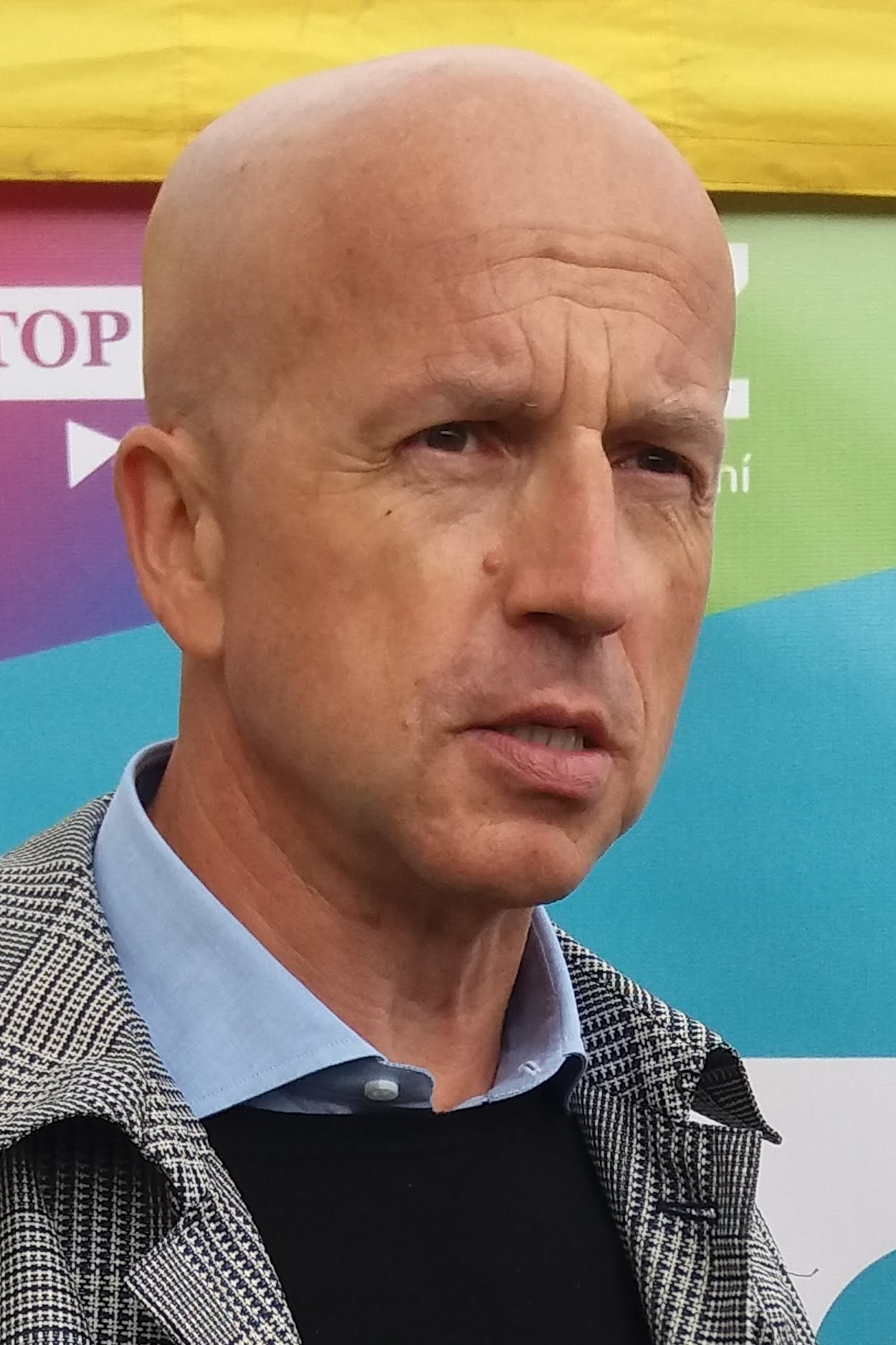

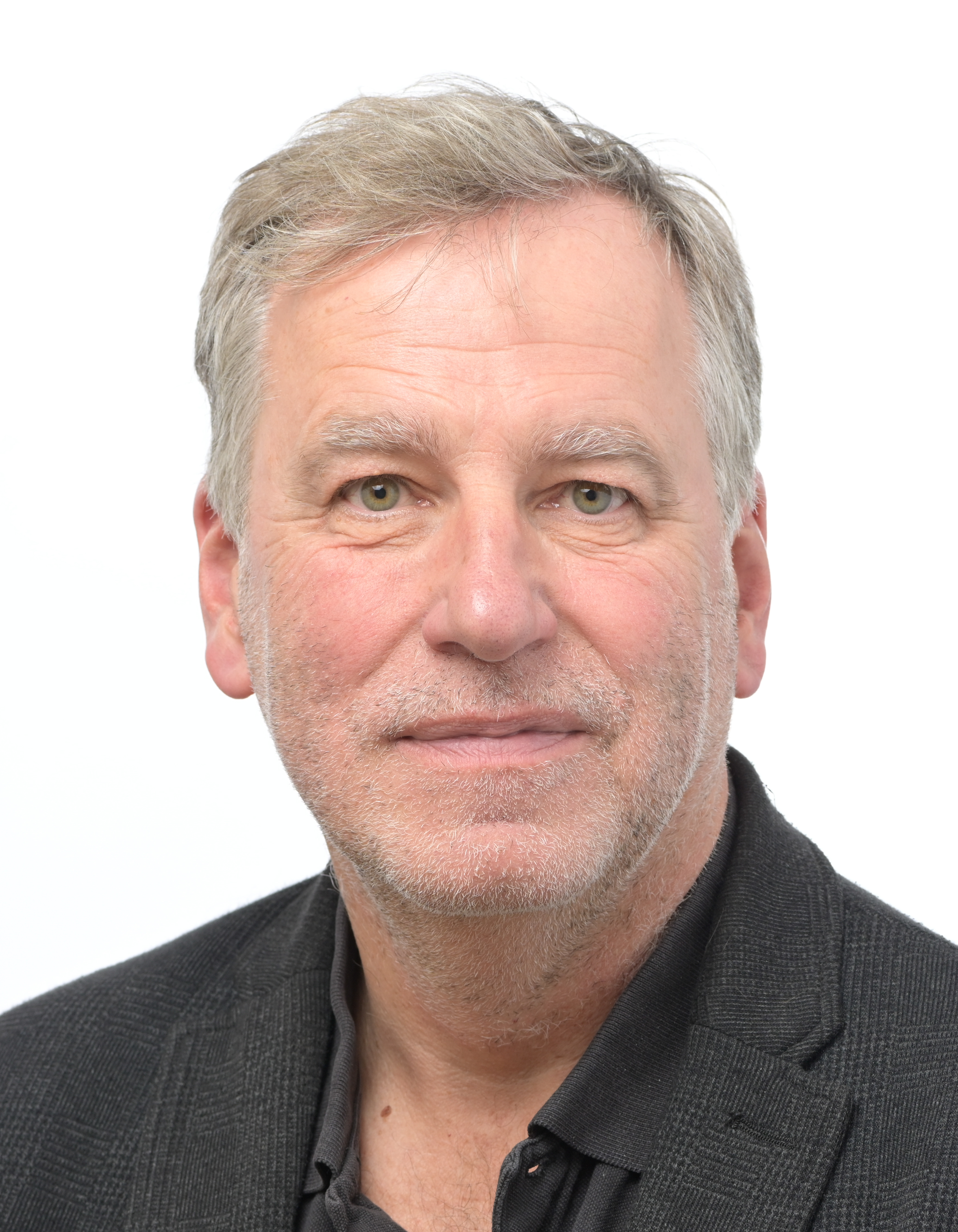

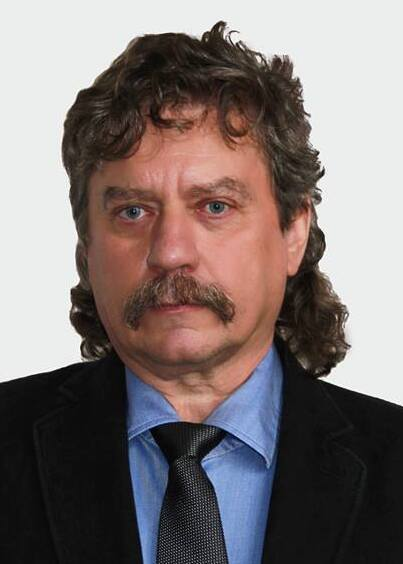

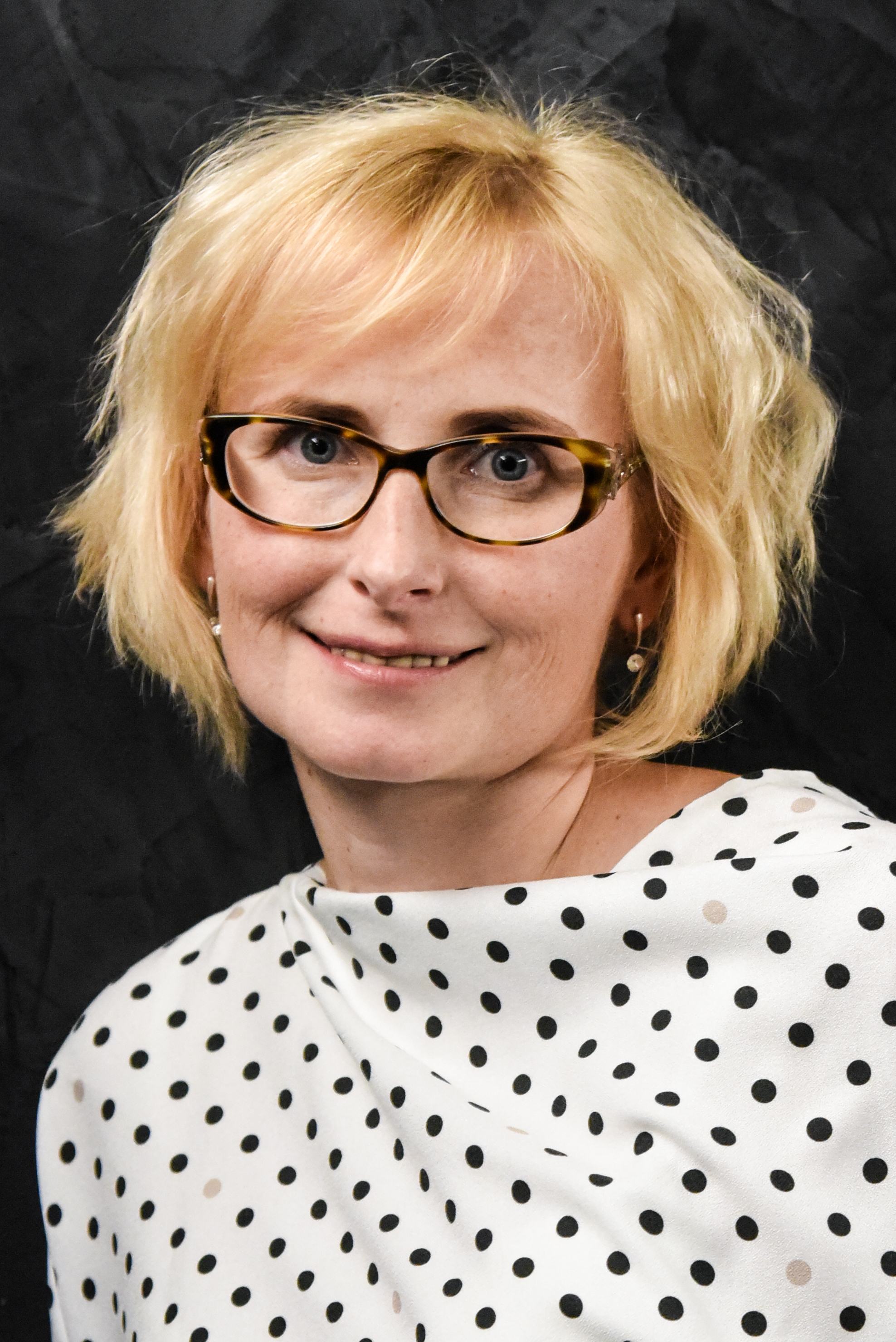

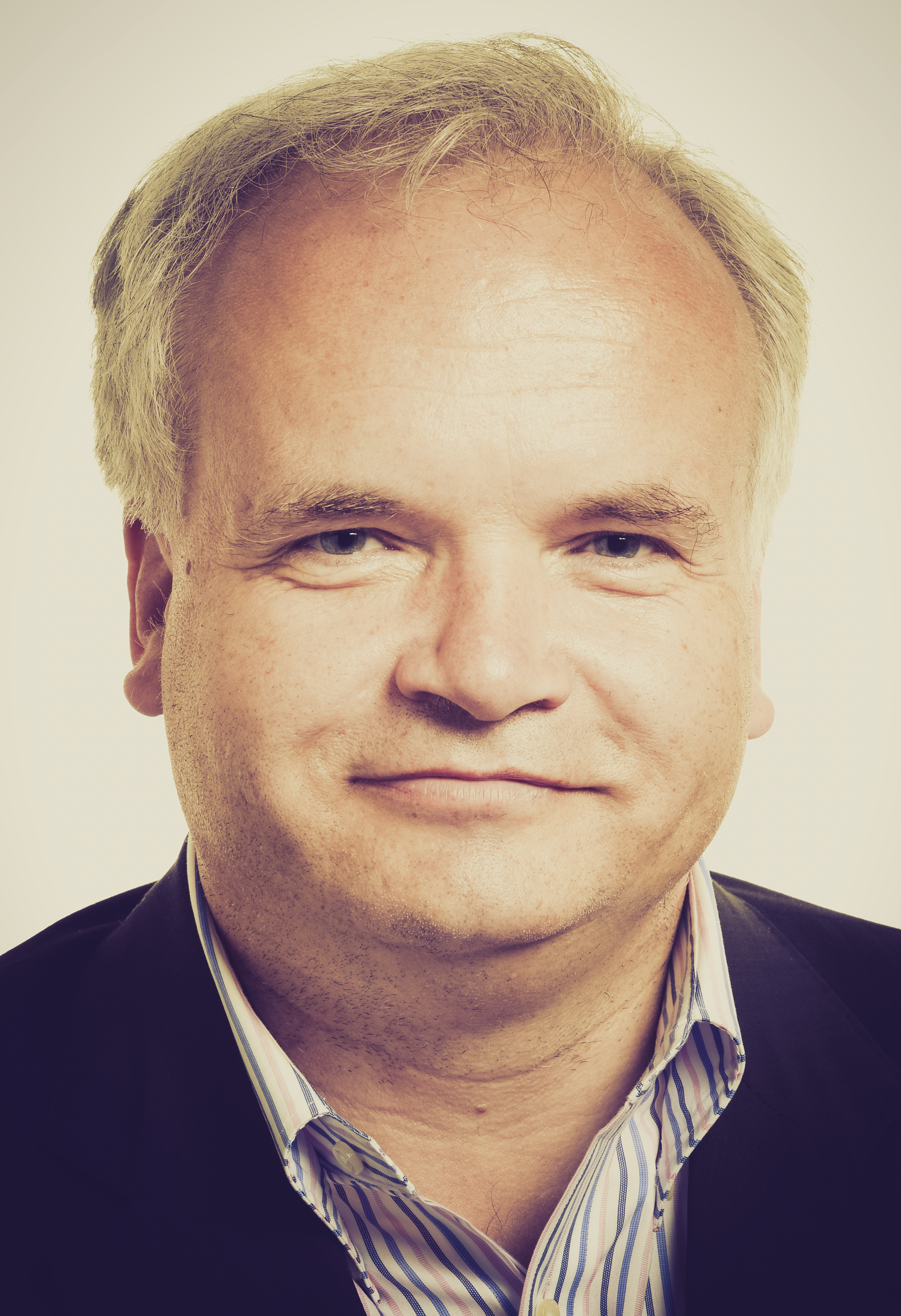

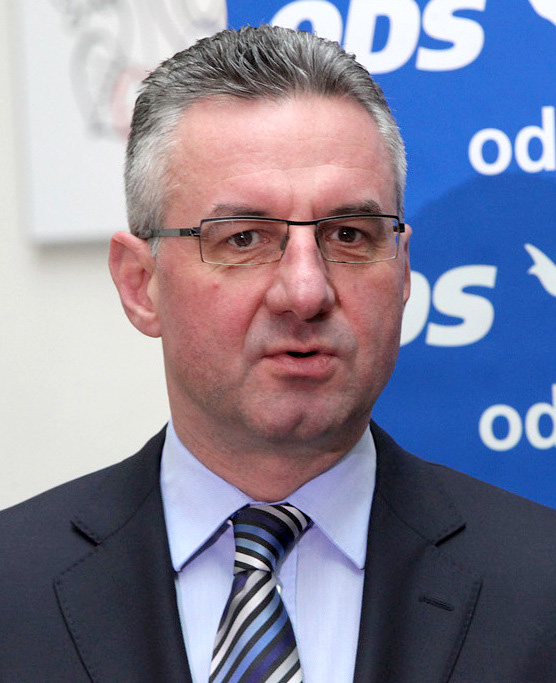

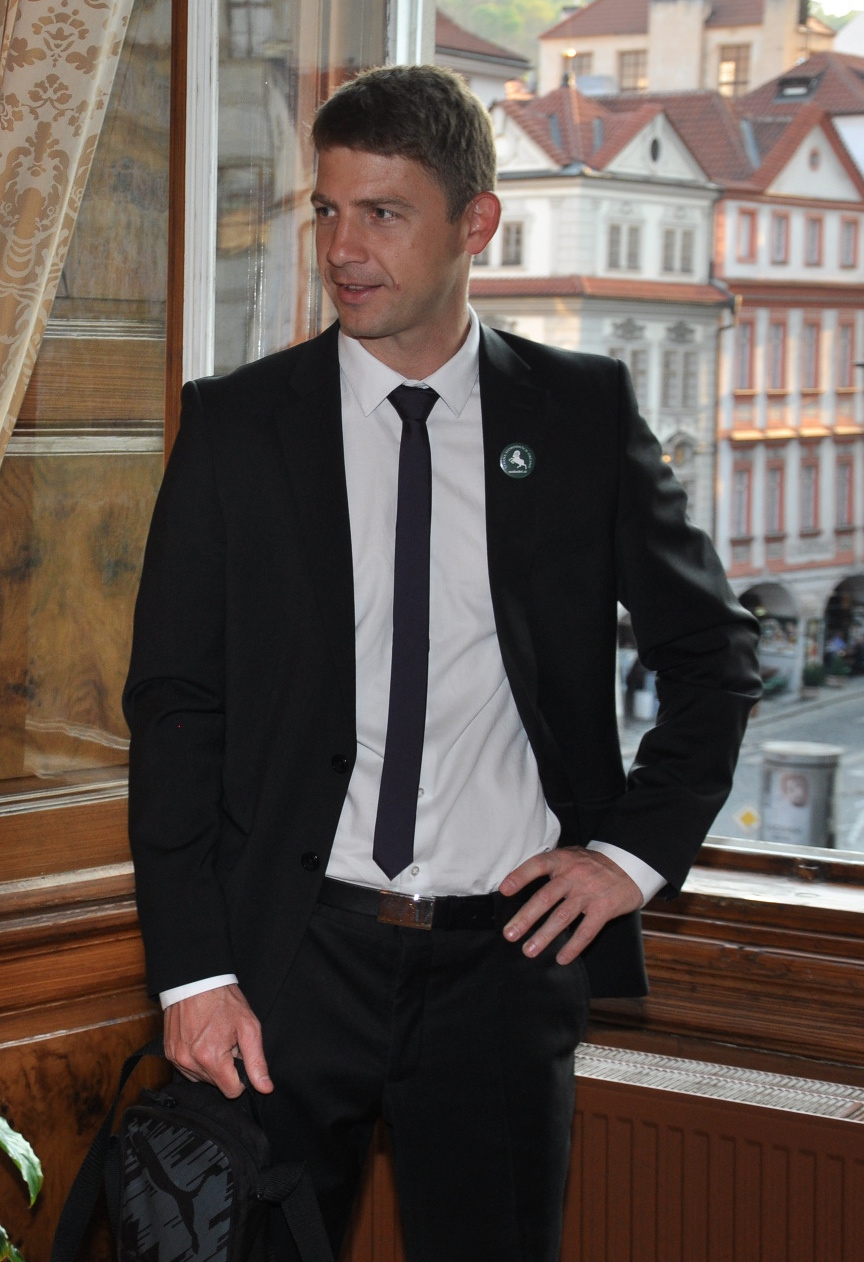
	First party	Second party	Third party
Leader	Pavel Telička	Luděk Niedermayer	Jan Keller
Party	ANO	TOP 09–STAN	ČSSD
Alliance	ALDE	EPP	PES
Last election	–	2.29%, 0 seats	22.39%, 7 seats
Seats won	4	4	4
Seat change	New	▲4	▼3
Popular vote	244,501	241,747	214,800
Percentage	16.13%	15.95%	14.17%
Swing	New	▲13.66pp	▼8.22pp
	Fourth party	Fifth party	Sixth party
Leader	Kateřina Konečná	Pavel Svoboda	Jan Zahradil
Party	KSČM	KDU-ČSL	ODS
Alliance	GUE/NGL	EPP	AECR
Last election	14.18%, 4 seats	7.65%, 2 seats	31.45%, 9 seats
Seats won	3	3	2
Seat change	▼1	▲1	▼7
Popular vote	166,478	150,792	116,398
Percentage	10.99%	9.95%	7.68%
Swing	▼3.19pp	▲2.30pp	▼23.77%
	Seventh party
Leader	Petr Mach
Party	Svobodní
Alliance	ADDE
Last election	1.27%, 0 seats
Seats won	1
Seat change	▲1
Popular vote	79,540
Percentage	5.25%
Swing	▲3.98pp

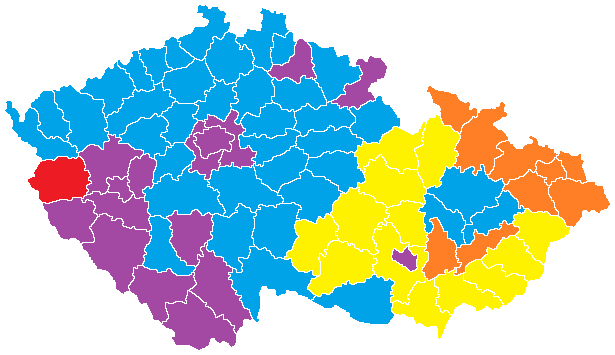
Results by district: ANO 2011 (blue), TOP 09 and STAN (purple), ČSSD (orange), KDU-ČSL (yellow) and KSČM (red)

European Parliament elections were held in the Czech Republic on 23 and 24 May 2014. In total, 21 Members of the European Parliament were elected using proportional representation (single district D'Hondt with a 5% threshold).

ANO won the election closely followed by the coalition of TOP 09 and STAN, themselves closely followed by ČSSD. A total of 7 parties gained seats, including the non-parliamentary Party of Free Citizens. Election turnout was 18.2%, the second lowest of all participating countries after Slovakia.

== Campaign finances ==
Party	ČSSD	ANO	TOP 09	ODS	KSČM	SZ	ÚSVIT	KDU-ČSL
Money spent	25,000,000 Kč	18,500,000 Kč	10,000,000 Kč	10,000,000 Kč	8,000,000 Kč	7,000,000 Kč	5,500,000 Kč	5,000,000 Kč

== Opinion polls ==
Date	Polling Firm	ANO	ČSSD	KSČM	TOP 09	ODS	ÚSVIT	KDU-ČSL	SZ	PIRÁTI	SVOBODNÍ	Others	Turnout
23–24 May	Election	16.1	14.2	11.0	16.0	7.7	3.1	10.0	3.8	4.8	5.2		18.2
24 May	iDnes	15.5	17.0	11.0	18.0	9.5	2.0	9.5	4.5	3.5	4.5		
Exit polls
9–13 May	Data Collect	20.1	12.5	12.2	14.2	7.2	7.7	4.6	4.9	4.3	4.7	7.6	
5–12 May	CVVM	25.0	23.0	11.0	8.0	6.0	1.0	6.0	2.0	2.0	2.0		35.0
14–21 Apr	STEM	24.7	18.5	11.9	10.7	7.4	2.0	6.7	2.0	1.9	2.6	11.6	
12–15 Apr	Data Collect	22.2	14.1	11.1	9.6	7.6	8.9	3.8	2.9	3.4	4.8	11.6	32.4
8–13 Apr	Sanep	23.2	20.1	14.5	8.2	5.4	3.2	5.2	2.9	3.2	n/a	14.1	27.4

== Results ==
Party	Votes	%	+/–	Seats	+/–
ANO 2011	244,501	16.13	New	4	New
TOP 09–STAN	241,747	15.95	+13.66	4	+4
Czech Social Democratic Party	214,800	14.17	−8.22	4	−3
Communist Party of Bohemia and Moravia	166,478	10.99	−3.19	3	−1
KDU-ČSL	150,792	9.95	+2.30	3	+1
Civic Democratic Party	116,389	7.68	−23.77	2	−7
Party of Free Citizens	79,540	5.25	+3.98	1	+1
Czech Pirate Party	72,514	4.78	New	0	New
Green Party	57,240	3.78	+1.72	0	0
Dawn of Direct Democracy	47,306	3.12	New	0	New
Party of Common Sense	24,724	1.63	New	0	New
Communist Party of Czechoslovakia	8,549	0.56	New	0	New
Right Bloc	8,028	0.53	−0.47	0	0
SNK European Democrats	7,961	0.53	−1.13	0	0
DSSS–SPE	7,902	0.52	New	0	New
Liberal-Environmental Party	7,514	0.50	New	0	New
No To Brussels – National Democracy	7,109	0.47	New	0	New
National Socialists – Left of the 21st century	7,099	0.47	New	0	New
Public Affairs	6,988	0.46	−1.94	0	0
Moravané	6,614	0.44	+0.05	0	0
VIZE 2014	3,698	0.24	New	0	New
Civic Conservative Party	3,481	0.23	New	0	New
Labour Party – Disgruntled Citizens	2,899	0.19	New	0	New
Czech Party of Regions	2,535	0.17	New	0	New
Koruna Česká	2,434	0.16	−0.03	0	0
Club of Committed Non-Party Members	2,379	0.16	New	0	New
Republic	2,240	0.15	New	0	New
Czech Sovereignty	2,086	0.14	–4.12	0	0
Hnutí Sociálne Slabých	1,685	0.11	New	0	New
Citizens 2011	1,299	0.09	New	0	New
Assets of Independent Citizens	1,242	0.08	New	0	New
Roma Democratic Party	1,185	0.08	New	0	New
Republican Party of Bohemia, Moravia and Silesia	1,100	0.07	New	0	New
Fair Play – HNPD	900	0.06	New	0	New
Antibursík – stop ekoteroru!	761	0.05	New	0	New
Party of Equal Opportunities	640	0.04	New	0	New
Evropani.cz	631	0.04	New	0	New
Czech National Social Party	502	0.03	–0.00	0	0
Total	1,515,492	100.00	–	21	–1
Valid votes	1,515,492	99.22			
Invalid/blank votes	11,875	0.78			
Total votes	1,527,367	100.00			
Registered voters/turnout	8,395,132	18.19			
Source: Volby

=== European groups ===
Party	Seats	+/–
European People's Party	7	+5
Progressive Alliance of Socialists and Democrats	4	–3
Alliance of Liberals and Democrats for Europe	4	+4
European United Left–Nordic Green Left	3	–1
European Conservatives and Reformists	2	–7
Europe of Freedom and Direct Democracy	1	New
Total	21	–1

=== Elected members ===
The seats were given out within the parties to the candidates who received the preference votes, if number of preference votes exceeds 5% of votes for party (highlighted by bold), otherwise to the candidates by its order on party candidate list. 8 of 21 elected candidates are non-partisans (4 elected for ANO, 3 for TOP 09 and STAN and 1 for ČSSD).

ANO

1. Pavel Telička – 50,784 votes
2. Petr Ježek – 5,301 votes
3. Dita Charanzová – 8 356 votes
4. Martina Dlabajová – 4,789 votes

TOP 09 and STAN

1. Jiří Pospíšil – 77,724 votes
2. Luděk Niedermayer – 37,171 votes
3. Jaromír Štětina – 18,951 votes
4. Stanislav Polčák – 11,997 votes

ČSSD

1. Jan Keller – 57,812 votes
2. Olga Sehnalová – 10,955 votes
3. Pavel Poc – 3,818 votes
4. Miroslav Poche – 3,692 votes

KSČM

1. Kateřina Konečná – 28,154 votes
2. Miloslav Ransdorf – 14 384 votes
3. Jiří Maštálka – 11,525 votes

KDU-ČSL

1. Michaela Šojdrová – 22,220 votes
2. Pavel Svoboda – 21,746 votes
3. Tomáš Zdechovský – 5,063 votes

ODS

1. Jan Zahradil – 19,892 votes
2. Evžen Tošenovský – 16,514 votes

Svobodní

1. Petr Mach – 13,211 votes

== Aftermath ==
The Green Party and Pirate Party failed to reach 5% threshold. Both parties decided to deliver a complaint to Supreme Administrative Court. They were inspired by Germany, where the threshold was abolished. The court did not decide about the complaint and sent it to the Constitutional Court. Constitutional Court rejected the complaint on 1 June 2015. According to the court, abolishing the threshold would lead to less effective European Parliament as it would be fragmented too much.

If the threshold was abolished for 2014 elections Green Party and Pirate Party would get 1 MEP. Social Democrats and Christian Democrats would have 1 MEP less on the other hand.
