= Hlas =

Hlas (meaning "Voice" in Czech and Slovak) may refer to:

- Voice – Social Democracy, a Slovak political party
- Hlas (Czech political party)
