= Petr Ježek =

Czech politician and diplomat

Petr Ježek MEP
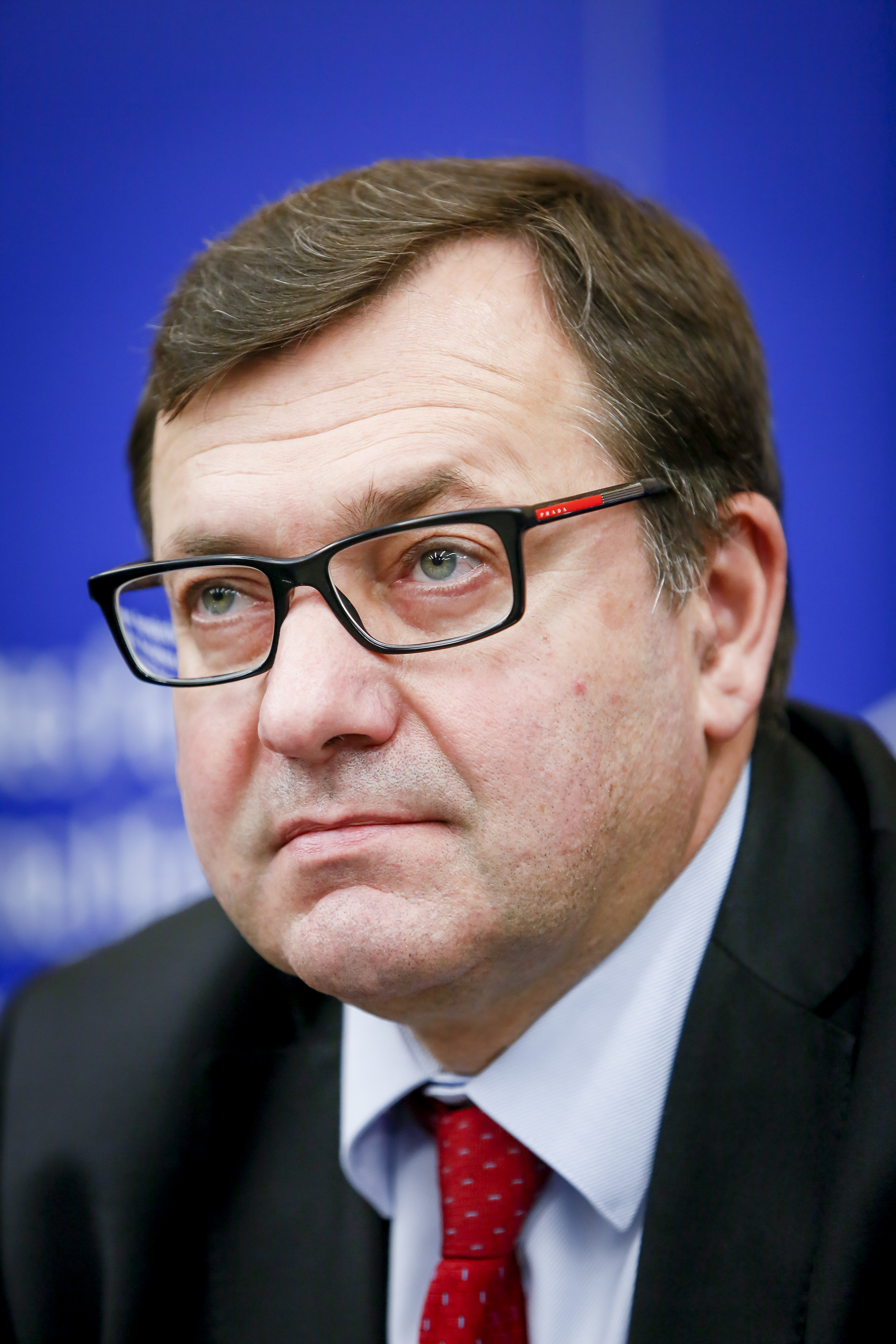

Member of the European Parliament
- In office 1 July 2014 – 1 July 2019
- Constituency: Czech Republic

Personal details
- Born: 28 March 1965 (age 61) Prague, Czechoslovakia (now Czech Republic)
- Party: HLAS (since 2019); European Union: Alliance of Liberals and Democrats for Europe
- Other political affiliations: Czech: ANO 2011 (2014–2017)
- Education: University of Economics, Prague

Petr Ježek (born 28 March 1965) is a former Czech politician and diplomat. He was a Member of the European Parliament (MEP) from 2014 to 2019, representing ANO 2011. While an MEP, he chaired a Parliamentary Committee and an External Delegation, and was ranked as the 20th most influential MEP of 751 by the Vote Watch Europe analyst group.

== Early life and education ==
Ježek studied Economics of International Trade at the University of Economics, Prague, graduating in 1987.

== EU diplomatic career ==
From 1989, he worked in a number of diplomatic and public service roles within the Czech government, related mainly to the Czech Republic's accession to the EU. In 1992 he was a volunteer with the EU Monitoring Mission in the war in the former Yugoslavia. In 1993 he was posted to the Czech Embassy in Copenhagen to cover the Danish EU Council Presidency, which was also dealing with the EU's Eastern enlargement.

Upon his return to Prague, he participated in establishment of the EU Department at the Czech Foreign Ministry, and as head of its unit and later European Correspondent he took part in deepening the structural political dialogue between the EU and its associate countries in Central and Eastern Europe. In the period of key negotiations and decisions on launching talks on EU enlargement and shaping EU future, between 1996 and 1999, he worked at the Czech Mission to the EU in Brussels as Political Counsellor, then Head of Political Department and Deputy Ambassador.

In 1999–2001, Ježek returned to Prague as Director of the Department for Political Relations with the EU at the Foreign Ministry, and then at the expanded Department for Western Europe and EU, dealing with bilateral and EU relations were dealt with. In 2001 he was appointed Director-General of the European Integration Section, the central and coordinating body for European affairs in the Czech Republic in charge of EU accession preparations, negotiations and also of the government communication campaign before the referendum on EU membership. He was also Deputy to the State Secretary for European Affairs and Deputy Chair of the inter-ministerial Committee for European Integration.

== Prime Minister's Office ==
In 2003–2004, under Vladimír Špidla, Ježek worked at the Office of the Czech Government as the Director of the Prime Minister's Departments and Offices, a politically independent civil servant.

== Private sector ==
From 2005 to 2013, Ježek was a partner in European affairs consultancy BXL Consulting, which he co-established with Pavel Telička, the first Czech EU Commissioner. The firm advised multinationals, foreign and Czech companies, and political actors such as the Cuban opposition.

== Political career ==
=== Member of the European Parliament ===
In 2013 Ježek and Telička started supporting ANO 2011, the new political party of Czech businessman Andrej Babis. They dissolved their firm, and in 2014 wrote the ANO manifesto and led the ANO candidacy list for the European Parliament elections, which ANO won on a very low turnout.

In 2014, Ježek and his three ANO colleagues joined the Alliance of Liberals and Democrats for Europe (ALDE) group in the European Parliament. He worked in the Committee on Economic and Monetary Affairs (ECON) where he was also ALDE Deputy Coordinator, in the Committee on Civil Liberties, Justice and Home Affairs (LIBE) and in another five committees including the Special Committee on Terrorism. He was also ALDE rapporteur for the anti-terrorism directive.

He was one of two rapporteurs for the Committee of Inquiry to investigate alleged contraventions and maladministration in the application of EU law in relation to money laundering, tax avoidance and tax evasion, created after the Panama Papers revelations. Later he was elected chair of the Special Committee on Financial Crimes, Tax Evasion and Tax Avoidance (TAX3), presiding over 34 public hearings with interested parties, coordination meetings of EP political groups, and committee missions to the United States, Isle of Man, Latvia, Estonia and Denmark.

For five years he chaired the EP Delegation for Relations with Japan. In this capacity he chaired the Inter-parliamentary EU-Japan Committee and led talks between the EP delegation and Japanese counterparts, also chairing regular meetings of the EP Delegation.

Petr Ježek was Parliament's rapporteur for two reports (one of which was legislative) and ALDE rapporteur for 30 reports (24 of which were legislative). As Parliament rapporteur he worked and negotiated 13 opinions. As ALDE rapporteur he dealt with 39 opinions. He took part, as Parliament or ALDE rapporteur, in 75 final negotiations between EU institutions on final texts of regulations or directives (so-called trialogues) he worked on.

He attended 99.71% of EP Plenary roll-call votes, the 7th highest in the parliament. He was the only MEP who chaired a committee and an external delegation at the same time, and was ranked 20th most influential MEP out of 751 in analysis by Vote Watch Europe.

His EP mandate ended at the beginning of July 2019.

=== Hlas ===
In January 2018, when ANO supported the candidacy of Miloš Zeman for Czech President, Petr Ježek announced that he was terminating his cooperation with the ANO movement, which had by now become by far the strongest political party in the Czech Republic, due to what he saw as the significant change of course and behaviour of ANO.

In February 2019, shortly before the European Parliament elections, Ježek and Telička established a new party, Hlas ("Voice"), with Ježek number two on its candidate list. The movement received 2.38% of the vote, below the necessary threshold to take seats in the European Parliament.

== Awards ==
In 2020 he was decorated with the Order of the Rising Sun, Gold Rays with Neck Ribbon for his contribution to strengthening relations between Japan and EU and promoting inter-parliamentary exchanges between Japan and EU.
