= Hlas (Czech political party) =

Voice Hlas
- Leader: Daniel Chlad
- Founded: 22 February 2019
- Split from: ANO 2011
- Headquarters: Prague
- Ideology: Liberalism; Pro-Europeanism
- Political position: Centre
- European Parliament group: Alliance of Liberals and Democrats for Europe (2019)
- Colours: Pink
- European Parliament: 0 / 21

Website
- hnutihlas.cz/

Hlas (lit. 'Voice') is a political party in the Czech Republic. It was founded in March 2019 by Pavel Telička and Petr Ježek, both members of the European Parliament elected for ANO 2011.

The party ran in the 2019 European Parliament election, receiving 56,449 votes (2.38%), failing to win any seats.

== Election results ==
=== European Parliament ===
Election	List leader	Votes	%	Seats	+/−	EP Group
2019	Pavel Telička	56,449	2.38 (#9)	0 / 21	New	−
2024	Milan Hamerský	6,328	0.21 (#21)	0 / 21	0	−
