= Stanislav Polčák =

Czech politician (born 1980)

Stanislav Polčák MEP
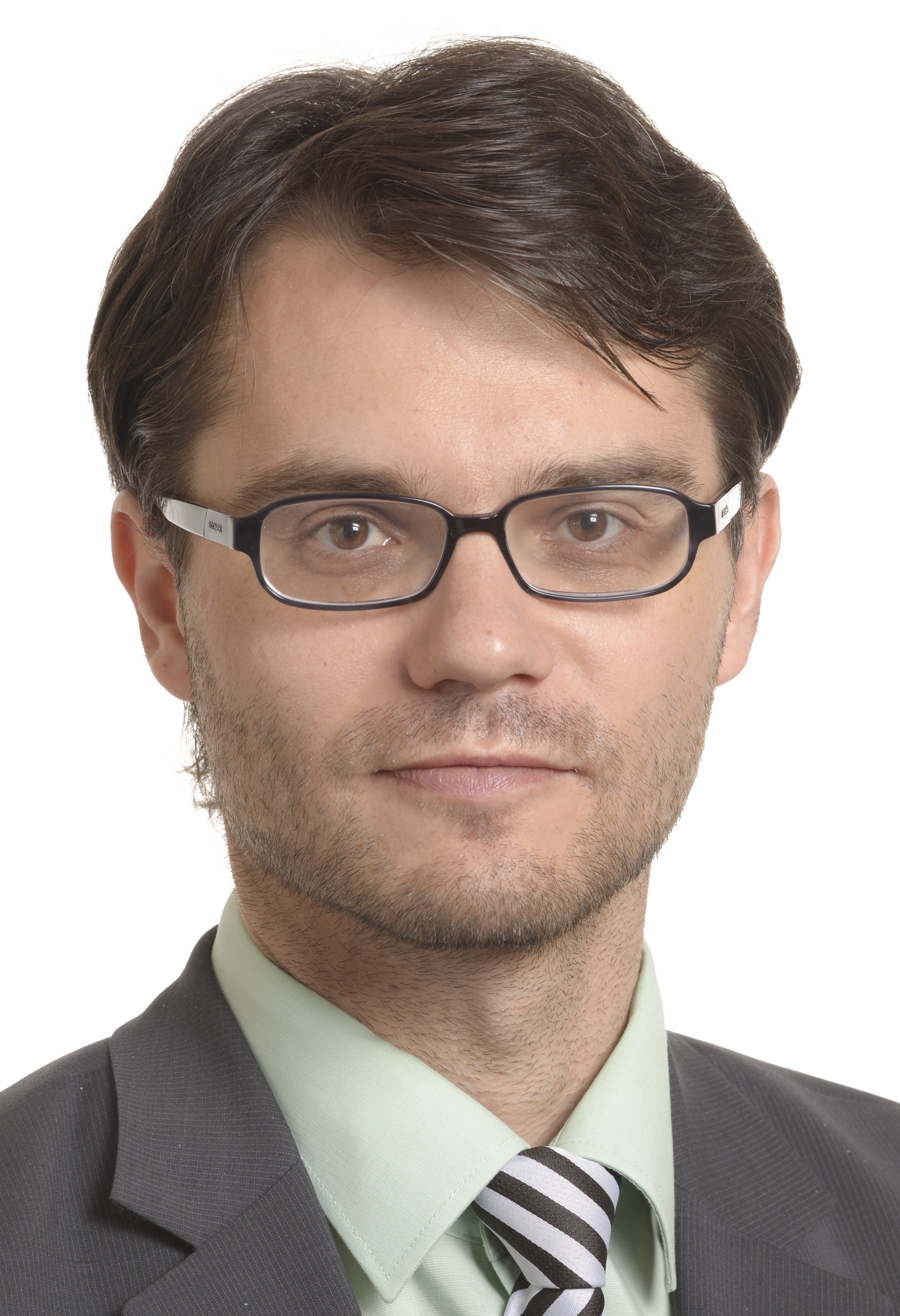

Member of the European Parliament for Czech Republic
- In office 1 July 2014 – 15 July 2024

1st Vice-Chair of STAN
- In office 4 June 2011 – 28 March 2014
- Preceded by: Josef Zicha
- Succeeded by: Petr Gazdík

Member of the Chamber of Deputies
- In office 29 May 2010 – 30 June 2014

Personal details
- Born: 21 February 1980 (age 46) Slavičín, Czechoslovakia
- Party: Mayors and Independents
- Education: Charles University in Prague
- Occupation: Lawyer
- Website: stanislav-polcak.cz

Stanislav Polčák (born 21 February 1980) is a Czech lawyer and politician who was elected as a Member of the European Parliament in 2014 and 2019.

== Early life ==
After defending a rigorous thesis in 2004, Polčák received the title JUDr. at the Faculty of Law of Charles University at the Department of Administrative Law, majoring in public law. He passed the bar exams in 2007.

== Political career ==
Between September 2005 and December 2006, Polčák was appointed a member of the expert commission of the Office of the Government of the Czech Republic for EU issues. He ended his post in December 2006.

=== Member of Mayors and Independents ===
Polčák was elected as a member of the Chamber of Deputies of the Parliament of the Czech Republic from TOP 09 candidates list. He was elected vice-chairman of Mayors and Independents of the Republic Assembly in Průhonice near Prague, holding the position until March 2017. Polčák was re-elected vice-chairman of the Elders and Independents (STAN) movement at the end of August 2021.

On 20 June 2022, Polčák has suspended his membership in the Mayors and Independents party in connection with his ties with businessman and lobbyist Michal Redl, who was earlier arrested in Operation Dozimetr case. After eight months, Polčák reestablished his membership and stated that he was not suspicious nor charged by police and whole situation was a media construct.

=== 2014 elections ===
In the 2014 European Parliament election, Polčák ran as a member of STAN from the third place of candidates TOP 09 and STAN. Due to the incompatibility of the functions, he resigned from the mandate of a member of the Chamber of Deputies of the Czech Republic on 30 June, and was replaced by Martin Plíšek.

In the municipal elections, Polčák ran as a member of the STAN for the Prague City Council on the candidate of the Triple Coalition: Green Party, KDU-ČSL, and STAN – but was unsuccessful.

=== Later political career ===
In the 2019 European Parliament election, Polčák defended his MEP mandate as a second-place member of Mayors and Independents, receiving 25,352 preferential votes.

As an MEP, Polčák voted for the Energy Performance of Buildings Directive as part of the " Fit for 55 " plan, part of the European Union's broader strategy to achieve carbon neutrality by 2050 known as the Green Deal for Europe. According to the directive, all newly-constructed buildings should not have emissions and houses must be climate neutral, respectively from 2030 and 2050. He was not selected in the 2024 European Parliament election.

== Controversy ==
In 2011, Hospodářské noviny wrote that Polčák had claimed CZK 7.5 million, to which he said that he was only representing his client.

=== Vrbětice case ===
In March 2022, his claim to 7.7 million CZK for representing municipalities in the " Vrbětice " case caused controversy, when he did not mention his right during the entire time, and only claimed it at the end of the court case. After media coverage of the case, Polčák waived his claim and resigned as vice-chairman of Mayors and Independents.

At the end of February 2017, Czech Radio reported that Polčák consulted on nominations for important positions in Prague companies and at the municipality with businessman Michal Redl, a man known from the cases of Radovan Krejčíř. In response to this event the next day, Polčák decided not to run for any elected office in the movement during the March Assembly of Mayor and Independents.

In October 2023, Deník N reported that police filed on the case contained the statement of Polčák, who appeared as a witness in the case of Redl's accusation. Polčák was originally personally acquainted with Redl's father, Petr, with whom he worked as a lawyer in Zlín.
