= Jan Keller =

Czech sociologist and politician (born 1955)

Jan Keller MEP
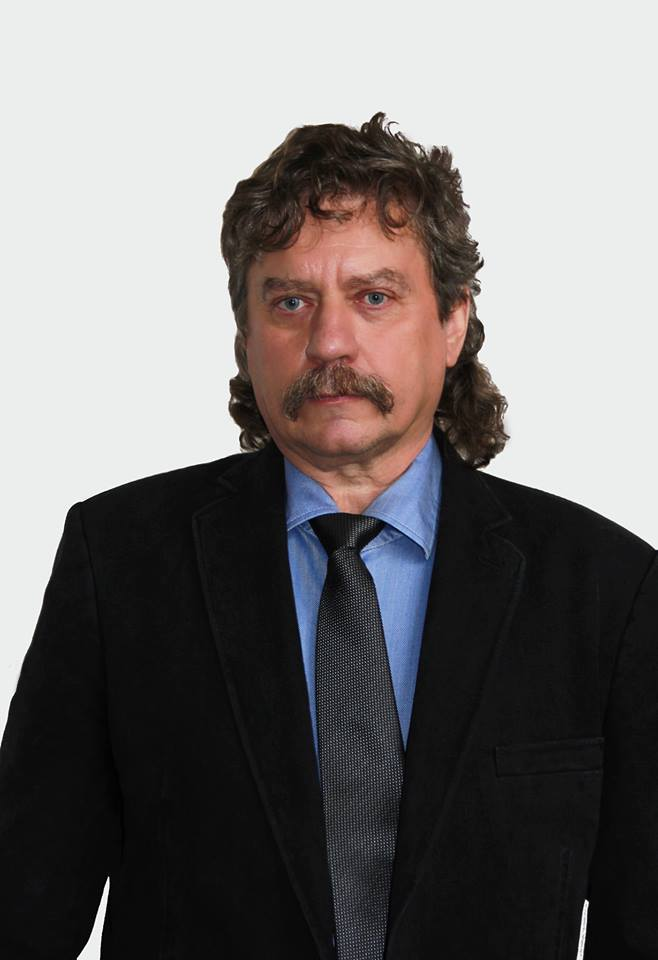

Member of the European Parliament for Czech Republic
- In office 1 July 2014 – 1 July 2019

Personal details
- Born: 23 January 1955 (age 71) Frýdek-Místek, Czechoslovak Republic
- Citizenship: Czech
- Party: Communist Party of Czechoslovakia; Social Democratic Party
- Education: Masaryk University
- Profession: Sociologist

Jan Keller is a Czech sociologist and politician. From 2014 to 2019, he was a Member of the European Parliament representing the Czech Republic, elected as a non-partisan for the Social Democratic Party. He publishes political commentaries and essays mainly in the Czech daily Právo.

In the 1970s and 1980s he was a member of the Communist Party of Czechoslovakia.

== Parliamentary service ==
- Member, Committee on Employment and Social Affairs
- Member, Delegation for relations with Canada
- Member, Delegation to the Euronest Parliamentary Assembly
