= Alliance of Liberals and Democrats for Europe group =

Former liberal political group of the European Parliament

Alliance of Liberals and Democrats for Europe Group
- European Parliament group
- Name: Alliance of Liberals and Democrats for Europe Group
- English abbr.: ALDE Group
- French abbr.: ADLE Groupe
- Formal name: Group of the Alliance of Liberals and Democrats for Europe
- Ideology: Liberalism; Social liberalism Conservative liberalism
- Political position: Centre
- European parties: ALDE Party; EDP
- Associated organisations: Alliance of Liberals and Democrats for Europe; Liberal International
- From: 20 July 2004
- To: June 2019
- Preceded by: European Liberal Democrat and Reform Party Group
- Succeeded by: Renew Europe
- Website: aldeparty.eu

The Group of the Alliance of Liberals and Democrats for Europe (ALDE Group) was the liberal–centrist political group of the European Parliament from 2004 until 2019 when it merged into Renew Europe.

ALDE was made up of MEPs from two European political parties, the Alliance of Liberals and Democrats for Europe Party and the European Democratic Party, which collectively form the Alliance of Liberals and Democrats for Europe.

The ALDE Group traced its unofficial origin back to September 1952 and the first meeting of the Parliament's predecessor, the Common Assembly of the European Coal and Steel Community. Founded as an explicitly liberal group, it expanded its remit to cover the different traditions of each new Member State as they acceded to the Union, progressively changing its name in the process. Its immediate predecessor was the European Liberal Democrat and Reform Party Group (ELDR).

The ALDE Group was the fourth-largest group in the Eighth European Parliament term, and previously participated in an informal coalition with the EPP during the Sixth Parliament (2004–2009). The pro-European platform of ALDE was in support of free market economics and pushed for European integration and the European single market.

On 12 June 2019, it was announced that the successor group in alliance with La République En Marche! would be named Renew Europe.

== History ==
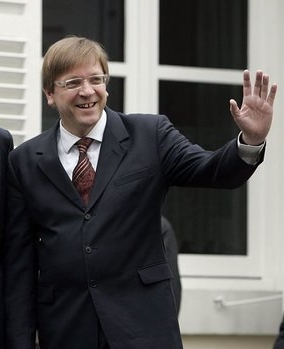
Guy Verhofstadt

The ALDE Group traced its unofficial ancestry back to the Liberal members present at the first meeting of the Common Assembly of the European Coal and Steel Community (the Parliament's predecessor) on 10 September 1952, but the Group was officially founded as the Group of Liberals and Allies on 23 June 1953.

As the Assembly grew into the Parliament, the French Gaullists split from the Group on 21 January 1965 and the Group started the process of changing its name to match the liberal/centrist traditions of the new member states, firstly to the Liberal and Democratic Group in 1976, then to the Liberal and Democratic Reformist Group on 13 December 1985, then to the Group of the European Liberal Democrat and Reform Party on 19 July 1994 to match the European political party of the same name.

In 1999, the Group partnered with European People's Party–European Democrats (EPP-ED) group to form an informal coalition for the Fifth Parliament. This included supporting the EPP's candidate for President of the Parliament in 1999 and the ALDE candidate in 2002. This meant that the Group secured its first President of the European Parliament since Simone Veil, when Pat Cox was elected to the post to serve the latter half of the Parliament's five-year term. This arrangement was discontinued after the 2009 election, when the EPP and the socialist S&D Group formed an informal Grand Coalition.

On 13 July 2004, the Group approved a recommendation to unite with MEPs from the centrist political party at the European level called the European Democratic Party (EDP) founded by François Bayrou's Union for French Democracy, the Labour Party of Lithuania and Democracy is Freedom – The Daisy of Italy.

The Group accordingly became the Group of the Alliance of Liberals and Democrats for Europe (ALDE) on 20 July 2004, to match the eponymous transnational political alliance, although the two European-level parties remained separate outside the European Parliament. The MEP Graham Watson of the British Liberal Democrats became the first chair of ALDE.

In May 2019, speaking at a debate leading up to the 2019 European Parliament election, ALDE President Guy Verhofstadt announced that following the election, the group would form a new, centrist alliance with Emmanuel Macron's "Renaissance" list and be renamed as Renew Europe.

== Membership ==
The ALDE has MEPs from 20 countries, including 14 with more than one MEP (in yellow) and six with one MEP each (light yellow).

=== Membership by party in Sixth, Seventh and Eighth Parliaments ===
The national parties that are members of ALDE are as follows:

| Country | National party | National party in national language | European party | MEPs 2004–2009 | MEPs 2009–2014 | MEPs 2014–2019 |
|---|---|---|---|---|---|---|
| Austria | NEOS – The New Austria and Liberal Forum | Neos – Das Neue Österreich und Liberales Forum | ALDE | 1 / 18 | – | 1 / 18 |
| Belgium | Open Flemish Liberals and Democrats | Dutch: Open Vlaamse Liberalen en Democraten | ALDE | 3 / 24 3 / 14 | 3 / 22 3 / 13 | 3 / 21 3 / 12 |
| Belgium | Reformist Movement | French: Mouvement Réformateur | ALDE | 2 / 24 2 / 9 | 2 / 22 2 / 8 | 2 / 21 2 / 8 |
| Belgium | Reformist Movement | French: Mouvement Réformateur | EDP (Note: Gérard Deprez as EDP individual member) | 1 / 24 1 / 9 | – | 1 / 21 1 / 8 |
| Bulgaria | National Movement for Stability and Progress | Национално движение за стабилност и възход (Nacionalno Dviženie za Stabilnost i Văzhod) | ALDE | 2 / 18 | 2 / 18 | – |
| Bulgaria | Movement for Rights and Freedoms | Движение за права и свободи (Dvizhenie za Prava i Svobodi) | ALDE | 3 / 18 | 3 / 18 | 4 / 17 |
| Bulgaria | We Continue the Change | Продължаваме Промяната (Prodalzhavame Promianata) | ALDE | | | |
| Croatia | Civic Liberal Alliance | Građansko-liberalni savez | ALDE | – | – | 1 / 11 |
| Croatia | Istrian Democratic Assembly | Istarski demokratski sabor - Dieta democratica istriana | ALDE | – | – | 1 / 11 |
| Cyprus | Democratic Party | Greek: Δημοκρατικό Κόμμα (Dimokratikó Kómma); Turkish: Demokrat Parti | ALDE (Note: The Democratic Party left the ALDE for S&D in 2009.) | 1 / 6 | – | – |
| Czech Republic | ANO 2011 | ANO 2011 | ALDE | – | – | 2 / 21 |
| Czech Republic | Petr Ježek and Pavel Telička (Independent) (Note: They were elected as ANO 2011) | – | – | – | – | 2 / 21 |
| Denmark | Venstre - Denmark's Liberal Party | Venstre - Danmarks Liberale Parti | ALDE | 3 / 14 | 3 / 13 | 1 / 13 (Note: Jens Rhode was originally also elected for Ventre, but left to join Danish Social Liberal Party in December 2015.) |
| Denmark | Danish Social Liberal Party | Det Radikale Venstre | ALDE | 1 / 14 | – | 2 / 13 |
| Estonia | Estonian Centre Party | Eesti Keskerakond | ALDE | 1 / 6 | 2 / 6 | 1 / 6 |
| Estonia | Estonian Reform Party | Eesti Reformierakond | ALDE | 1 / 6 | 1 / 6 | 2 / 6 |
| Finland | Centre Party | Finnish: Suomen Keskusta; Swedish: Centern i Finland | ALDE | 4 / 14 | 3 / 13 | 3 / 13 |
| Finland | Swedish People's Party | Finnish: Suomen ruotsalainen kansanpuolue Swedish: Svenska Folkpartiet i Finland | ALDE | 1 / 14 | 1 / 13 | 1 / 13 |
| France | Democratic Movement | Mouvement Démocrate | EDP | 7 / 78 | 5 / 74 | 2 / 74 (Note: 4 MoDem MEPs were elected in 2014) |
| France | Cap21 | Citoyenneté Action Participation Pour le XXI^{e} Siècle | None | – | 1 / 74 | – |
| France | Civic Alliance for Democracy in Europe | Alliance Citoyenne pour la Démocratie en Europe | ALDE | 3 / 78 | – | – |
| France | Génération citoyens | – | none | – | – | 1 / 74 |
| France | Radical Movement | Mouvement radical | ALDE | – | – | 2 / 74 |
| France | Union of Democrats and Independents | Union des démocrates et indépendants | EDP (2014–2016) ALDE (2016–2019) | – | – | 1 / 74 |
| Germany | Free Democratic Party | Freie Demokratische Partei | ALDE | 7 / 99 | 12 / 99 | 3 / 96 |
| Germany | Free Voters | Freie Wähler | EDP | – | – | 1 / 96 |
| Greece | Drassi | Δράση; Drassi | none | – | 1 / 22 | – |
| Hungary | Alliance of Free Democrats | Szabad Demokraták Szövetsége - A Magyar Liberális Párt | ALDE | 2 / 24 | – | – |
| Hungary | Hungarian Liberal Party | Magyar Liberális Párt - Liberálisok | ALDE | – | – | – |
| Hungary | Momentum Movement | Momentum Mozgalom | ALDE | – | – | – |
| Ireland | Fianna Fáil | – | ALDE | (Note: Fianna Fáil was then a member of Union for Europe of the Nations.) | 3 / 12 | (Note: The sole Fianna Fáil member sat with the European Conservatives and Reformists.) |
| Ireland | Marian Harkin (Independent) | – | EDP | 1 / 13 | 1 / 12 | 1 / 11 |
| Italy | Democracy is Freedom – The Daisy (note: merged into PD in 2007) | Democrazia è Libertà - La Margherita | EDP | 9 / 78 | – | – |
| Italy | Italy of Values | Italia dei Valori | ALDE | 1 / 78 | 5 / 73 | – |
| Italy | Alliance for Italy | Alleanza per l'Italia | EDP | 1 / 78 | 1 / 73 | – |
| Italy | Italian Radicals | Radicali Italiani | ALDE | 2 / 78 | – | – |
| Latvia | Latvia's First Party/Latvian Way | Latvijas Pirmā Partija / Latvijas Ceļš | ALDE | 1 / 9 | 1 / 9 | – |
| Latvia | Union of Greens and Farmers | Zaļo un Zemnieku savienība | EGP (LZP) | – | – | 1 / 8 |
| Lithuania | Labour Party | Darbo Partija | ALDE | 5 / 13 (Note: EDP member until 2012) | 1 / 12 | 2 / 11 |
| Lithuania | Liberal and Centre Union | Liberalų ir Centro Sąjunga | ALDE | 2 / 13 | – | – |
| Lithuania | Liberal Movement | Liberalų Saįūdis | ALDE | – | 1 / 12 | 1 / 11 |
| Luxembourg | Democratic Party | Luxembourgish: Demokratesch Partei; French: Parti Démocratique; German: Demokratische Partei | ALDE | 1 / 6 | 1 / 6 | 1 / 6 |
| Netherlands | People's Party for Freedom and Democracy | Volkspartij Voor Vrijheid en Democratie | ALDE | 4 / 27 | 3 / 26 | 3 / 26 |
| Netherlands | Democrats 66 | Democraten 66 | ALDE | 1 / 27 | 3 / 26 | 4 / 26 |
| Poland | Democratic Party – demokraci.pl | Partia Demokratyczna - Demokraci.pl | ALDE | 4 / 54 | – | – |
| Poland | Paweł Piskorski (Independent) | – | none | 1 / 54 | – | – |
| Poland | Marek Czarnecki (Independent) | – | none | 1 / 54 | – | – |
| Portugal | Liberal Initiative | Iniciativa Liberal | ALDE | – | – | – |
| Portugal | Democratic Republican Party | Partido Democrático Republicano | EDP | – | – | 1 / 21 |
| Romania | National Liberal Party | Partidul Național Liberal | ALDE (Note: Following the 2014 European Parliament election, the National Liberal Party (PNL) left ALDE to join the European People's Party. Reelected MEPs Norica Nicolai and Renate Weber rejoined the ALDE group later and were subsequently expelled from their party.) | 6 / 35 | 5 / 33 | – |
| Romania | Alliance of Liberals and Democrats (formerly PNL and Independent) | Alianța Liberalilor și Democraților | ALDE | – | – | 1 / 32 |
| Romania | Renate Weber (formerly PNL) | – | ALDE | – | – | 1 / 32 |
| Romania | Mircea Diaconu (Independent) | – | ALDE | – | – | 1 / 32 |
| Slovakia | People's Party – Movement for a Democratic Slovakia | Ľudová Strana - Hnutie Za Demokratické Slovensko | EDP | – | 1 / 13 | – |
| Slovenia | Liberal Democracy of Slovenia | Liberalna Demokracija Slovenije | ALDE | 2 / 7 | 1 / 8 | – |
| Slovenia | Zares – Social Liberals | Zares - Socialno-Liberalni | ALDE | – | 1 / 8 | – |
| Slovenia | Democratic Party of Pensioners of Slovenia | Demokratična stranka upokojencev Slovenije | EDP | – | – | 1 / 8 |
| Slovenia | List of Marjan Sarec | Lista Marjana Šarca, LMŠ | ALDE | – | – | – |
| Spain | Basque Nationalist Party | Basque: Euzko Alderdi Jeltzalea | EDP | 1 / 54 | 1 / 54 | 1 / 54 |
| Spain | Catalan European Democratic Party | Catalan: Partit Demòcrata Europeu Català | ALDE | 1 / 54 | 1 / 54 | 1 / 54 |
| Spain | Union, Progress and Democracy | Spanish: Unión, Progreso y Democracia | None | – | 1 / 54 | 4 / 54 |
| Spain | Citizens | Spanish: Ciudadanos – Partido de la Ciudadanía | ALDE | – | – | 2 / 54 |
| Sweden | Liberals | Liberalerna | ALDE | 1 / 19 | 3 / 20 | 2 / 20 |
| Sweden | Centre Party | Centerpartiet | ALDE | 1 / 19 | 1 / 20 | 1 / 20 |
| United Kingdom | Liberal Democrats | Welsh: Democratiaid Rhyddfrydol | ALDE | 11 / 78 | 12 / 73 | 1 / 73 |
| Total ALDE Party | | | | 70 | 74 | 56 |
| Total EDP | | | | 26 | 10 | 8 |
| Total Other | | | | 4 | 1 | 4 |
| Total | | | | 100 | 85 | 68 |

=== Membership at formation ===
In September 1952, the third-largest grouping in the Common Assembly was the Liberal grouping with 11 members. The Group of Liberals and Allies was officially founded on 23 June 1953. By mid-September 1953, it was again the third-largest Group with 10 members.

== Structure ==
=== Subgroups ===
ALDE was a coalition of liberal and centrist MEPs. It did not have formal subgroups, although the MEPs fell naturally into two informal subgroups, depending on whether they associated with the Alliance of Liberals and Democrats for Europe Party or the European Democratic Party.

=== Organisation ===
The Bureau was the main decision making body of the ALDE Group and is composed of the leaders of the delegations from each member state that elects ALDE MEPs. The Bureau oversaw the ALDE Group's main strategy and policies and was headed by a chair (referred to as the Leader). The day-to-day running of the Group was performed by its secretariat, led by its Secretary-General.

The senior staff of ALDE as of July 2012 were as follows:

| Member | Position | Nation |
|---|---|---|
| Guy Verhofstadt | President | Belgium |
| Sophia in 't Veld | Vice-President | Netherlands |
| Pavel Telička | Vice-President | Czech Republic |
| Maite Pagazaurtundúa Ruiz | Vice-President | Spain |
| Andrus Ansip | Vice-President | Estonia |
| Filiz Hyusmenova | Vice-President | Bulgaria |
| Marielle de Sarnez | Vice-President | France |
| Izaskun Bilbao Barandica | Vice-President | Spain |
| Norica Nicolai | Vice-President | Romania |
| Petras Auštrevičius | Member | Lithuania |
| Catherine Bearder | Member | United Kingdom |
| Philippe De Backer | Member | Belgium |
| Mircea Diaconu | Member | Romania |
| José Inácio Faria | Member | Portugal |
| Fredrick Federley | Member | Sweden |
| Charles Goerens | Member | Luxembourg |
| Marian Harkin | Member | Ireland |
| Ivan Jakovčić | Member | Croatia |
| Alexander Graf Lambsdorff | Member | Germany |
| António Marinho e Pinto | Member | Portugal |
| Louis Michel | Member | Belgium |
| Angelika Mlinar | Member | Austria |
| Ulrike Müller | Member | Germany |
| Javier Nart | Member | Spain |
| Maite Pagazaurtundúa | Member | Spain |
| Morten Helveg Petersen | Member | Denmark |
| Jozo Radoš | Member | Croatia |
| Olli Rehn | Member | Finland |
| Yana Toom | Member | Estonia |
| Nils Torvalds | Member | Finland |
| Ramon Tremosa i Balcells | Member | Spain |
| Ulla Tørnæs | Member | Denmark |
| Viktor Uspaskich | Member | Lithuania |
| Ivo Vajgl | Member | Slovenia |
| Johannes Cornelis van Baalen | Member | Netherlands |
| Cecilia Wikström | Member | Sweden |

The chairs of ALDE and its predecessors from 1953 to 2019 are as follows:

| Chair | Took office | Left office | Country (Constituency) | Party |
|---|---|---|---|---|
| Yvon Delbos | 1953 | 1956 | France | Radical Party |
| René Pleven | 1957 | 1968 | France | Democratic and Socialist Union of the Resistance |
| Cornelis Berkhouwer | 1970 | 1973 | Netherlands | People's Party for Freedom and Democracy |
| Jean-François Pintat | 1978 | 1979 | France | Union for French Democracy |
| Martin Bangemann | 1979 | 1984 | West Germany | Free Democratic Party |
| Simone Veil | 1984 | 1989 | France | Union for French Democracy |
| Valéry Giscard d'Estaing | 1989 | 1991 | France | Union for French Democracy |
| Yves Galland | 1992 | 1994 | France | Union for French Democracy |
| Gijs de Vries | 1994 | 1998 | Netherlands | People's Party for Freedom and Democracy |
| Pat Cox | 1998 | 2002 | Ireland (Munster) | Independent |
| Graham Watson | 2002 | 2009 | United Kingdom (South West England) | Liberal Democrats |
| Guy Verhofstadt | 2009 | 2019 | Belgium (Dutch) | Open Flemish Liberals and Democrats |

== Academic analysis ==
Along with the other political groups, ALDE has been analysed by academics on its positions regarding various issues. In short, it's a group of cohesive, gender-balanced centrist Euroneutrals that cooperate most closely with the EPP, are ambiguous on hypothetical EU taxes and supportive of eventual full Turkish accession to the European Union.
