= Jaromír Štětina =

Czech journalist, writer and politician (1943–2025)

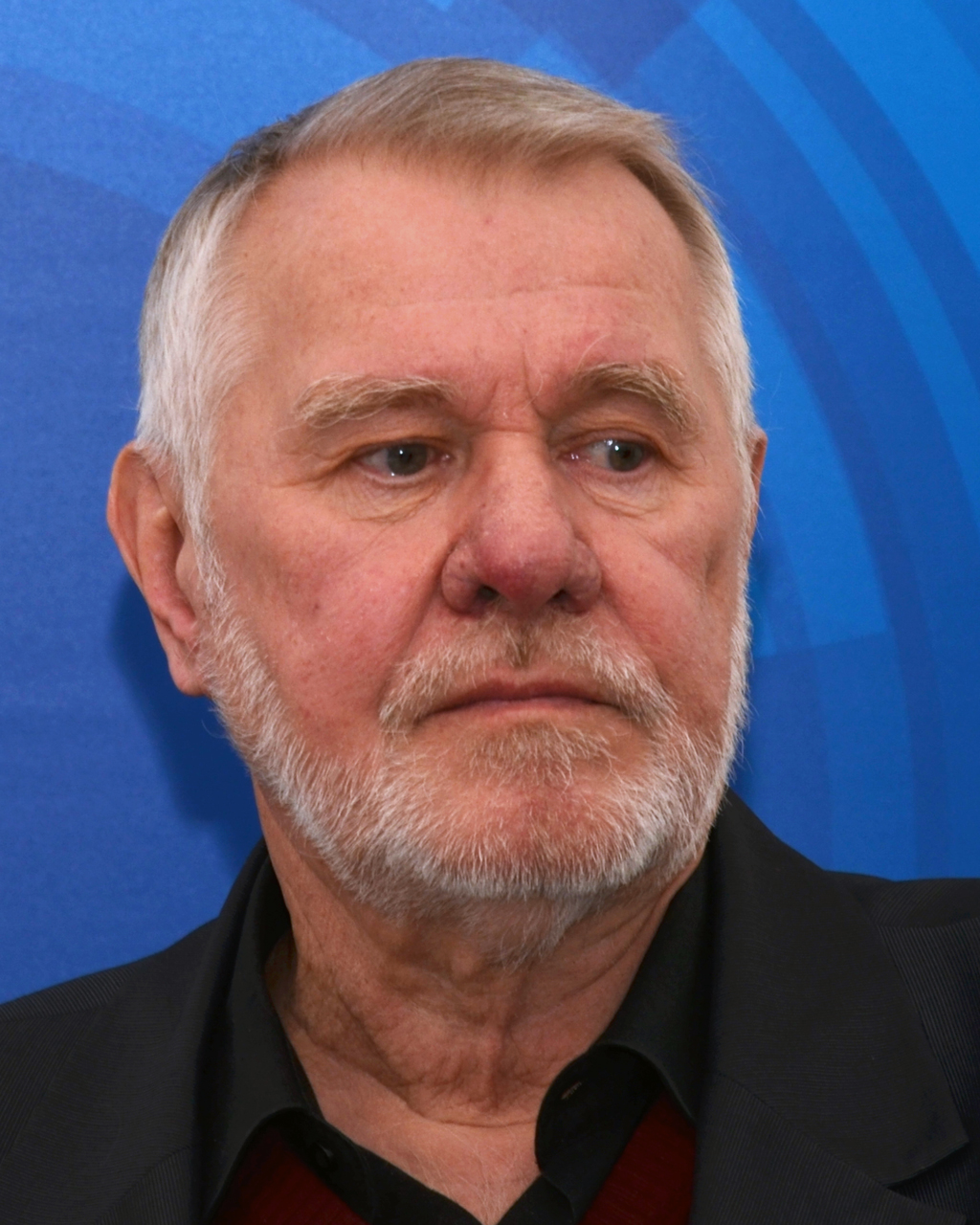

Member of the European Parliament for the Czech Republic
- In office 1 July 2014 – 1 July 2019

Senator from Prague 10
- In office 13 November 2004 – 30 June 2014
- Preceded by: Zuzana Roithová
- Succeeded by: Ivana Cabrnochová

Personal details
- Born: 6 April 1943 Prague, Protectorate of Bohemia and Moravia
- Died: 17 April 2025 (aged 82) Czech Republic
- Party: TOP 09; Europe Together (2019)
- Other political affiliations: Communist Party of Czechoslovakia (1967–1968); European People's Party (2019–2022)
- Children: 1
- Education: Prague University of Economics and Business, Charles University in Prague
- Website: jaromirstetina.cz

Jaromír Štětina (6 April 1943 – 17 April 2025) was a Czech journalist, writer and politician. He served as a member of the European Parliament from 2014 to 2019 for the Czech Republic, representing TOP 09. He was also known as a war correspondent from the conflict areas of the former Soviet Union countries.

== Biography ==
Štětina was born in Prague on 6 April 1943. From 1961 to 1967, he studied at the Prague University of Economics and Business.

From 1965 until 1968, Štětina was a member of the Communist Party of Czechoslovakia. In 1968, he started working as a journalist for the newspaper Mladá fronta Dnes, and his time there coincided with the Soviet occupation of Czechoslovakia, during which the Soviet army seized control of the newspaper's offices. Štětina was subsequently fired due to his disagreement with the Warsaw Pact occupation.

He subsequently worked as a geodesist, and while working, studied geology long-distance at Charles University in Prague, during which he organised 25 geologic or sport tours to Siberia and Asia. During the same years, Štětina wrote his most famous book, S matyldou po Indu, on the topic of rafting.

In 1987, he started engaging in public speaking. In 1989, he co-founded a syndicate of journalists, ultimately resuming his work as a journalist, at the re-established Lidové noviny. In 1990 he began working as a foreign correspondent in Moscow, where he covered numerous conflicts in the former Soviet Union. In 1992, he founded the Lidových novin foundation. During 1993–1994 he was editor-in-chief of Lidové noviny. In 1994, he founded the journalism agency Epicentrum, dedicated to war reporting, with fellow journalist Petra Procházková.

Štětina specialised in military conflicts, covering over 20 different conflict zones in Europe, Asia and Africa. He published 10 books, as well as dozens of documentaries, and many articles.

Štětina died on 17 April 2025, at the age of 82.

== Political career ==
In the 2004 elections to the Czech Senate, Štětina ran as an independent candidate under the umbrella of the Green Party. He won the election, becoming the senator for the Prague 10 district.

From 2014 to 2019, Štětina served as a Member of the European Parliament representing TOP 09. On 11 February 2019, he founded his own political party, Europe Together (Czech: Evropa společně), to contest the 2019 European Parliament elections. He said that the party would join the European People's Party if elected. Europe Together eventually finished 15th, with 0.59% of the vote, and did not win any seats.

Štětina was a founding signatory of the Prague Declaration on European Conscience and Communism.
