= Pavel Telička =

Czech politician (born 1965)

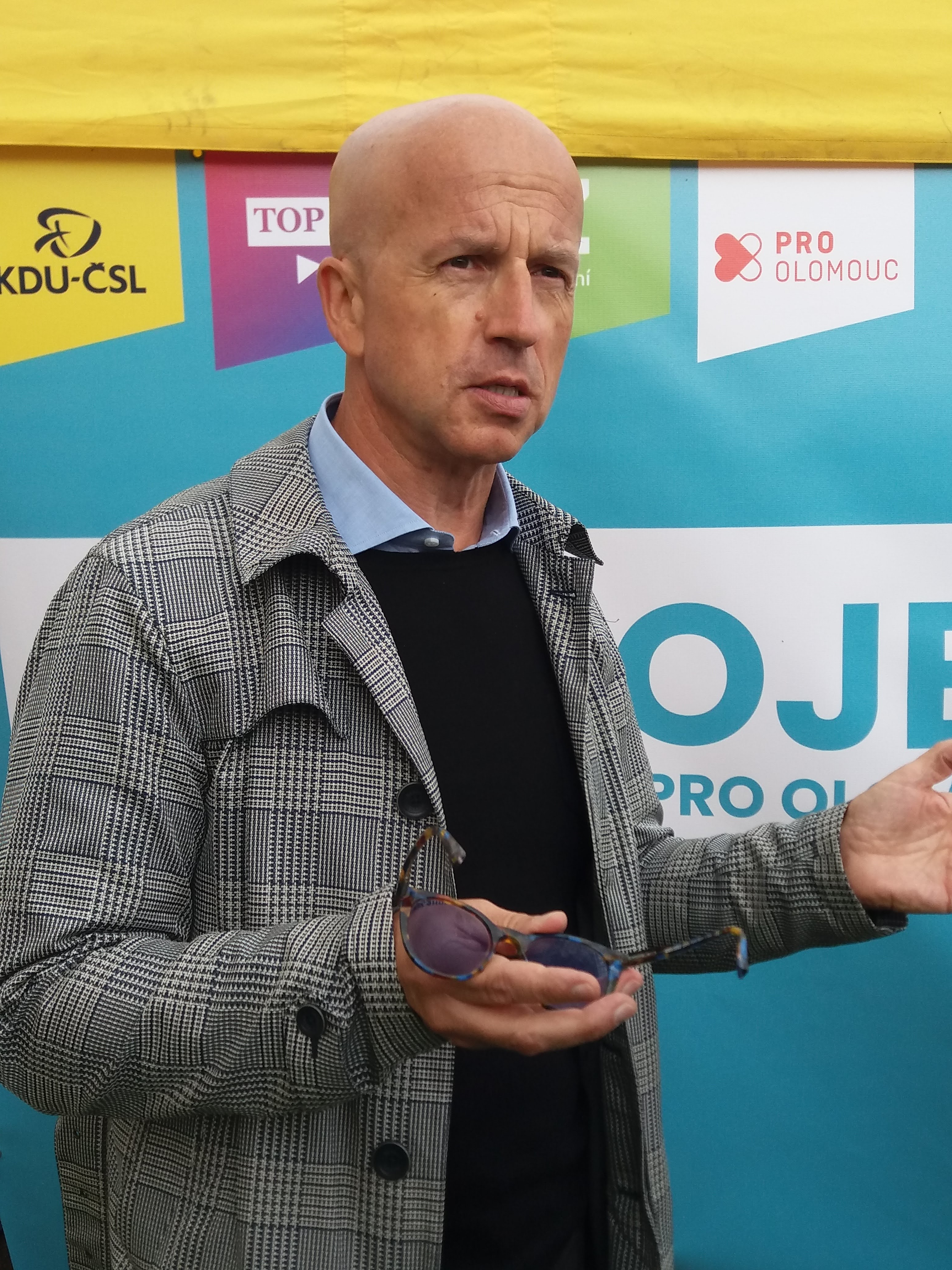
- Telička in 2020

Member of the European Parliament
- In office 1 July 2014 – 1 July 2019
- Constituency: Czech Republic

European Commissioner for Health and Consumer Protection
- In office 1 May 2004 – 22 November 2004
- President: Romano Prodi
- Preceded by: David Byrne
- Succeeded by: Markos Kyprianou

Personal details
- Born: 21 August 1965 (age 61) Washington, D.C., U.S.
- Party: Czech: ANO 2011 (2014–2017); HLAS (since 2019); EU: Alliance of Liberals and Democrats for Europe
- Spouse: Eva Teličková
- Children: 2
- Education: Charles University

Pavel Telička (born 21 August 1965) is a Czech lobbyist, politician and former Member of the European Parliament (MEP) from the Czech Republic. He previously served as European Commissioner for Health and Consumer Protection from May 2004 to November 2004. He was a member of ANO 2011, part of the Alliance of Liberals and Democrats for Europe, until 2017 when he quit amid disagreements with leader Andrej Babiš.

He served as a Vice President of the European Parliament from January 2017 until 2019.

== Early life ==
Telička was born in Washington, D.C. in 1965, the son of a communist diplomat. As a young man, he was a member of the Communist Party of Czechoslovakia. He graduated from the Faculty of Law, Charles University in Prague, in 1986, and began working at the Ministry of Foreign Affairs. In the following years, he held various positions in the ministry, including as Deputy Minister of Foreign Affairs, and in the Czech Mission to the European Union in Brussels. From 1998 onwards, he served as chief negotiator for the accession of the Czech Republic to the European Union.

== European Union ==
In February 2004, the Czech government nominated Miloš Kužvart, the former Czech Environment Minister, as a candidate for the EU commissioner. Kužvart, however, stepped down after his first visit as a candidate to Brussels, and Telička was drafted in to replace him.

When the Czech Republic entered the EU on 1 May 2004, Telička became a commissioner in the Prodi Commission, sharing the portfolio of Health and Consumer Protection with David Byrne. He held this post only until November 2004, and did not continue in the following Barroso Commission due to a Czech government crisis in summer 2004. He was succeeded as the Czech Republic's commissioner by Vladimír Špidla, the former Prime Minister who resigned during the crisis.

In December 2004, Telička co-founded BXL Consulting with offices in Prague and Brussels, providing consultancy in EU affairs. As of 2014, the company is no longer active. In 2013, he supported ANO 2011, led by Andrej Babiš, in the Czech parliament elections; he was the party's candidate in the 2014 European Parliament election. Since his election in July 2014, he was a vice-chair of the Alliance of Liberals and Democrats for Europe until the 2019 European Parliament election. In June 2019, he was elected the first leader of the HLAS party.

He was also elected president of the Czech Rugby Union in November 2009.

Political offices
New office	Czech European Commissioner; 2004	Succeeded by Vladimír Špidla
Preceded by David Byrne	European Commissioner for Health and Consumer Protection; 2004; Served alongside: David Byrne	Succeeded by Markos Kyprianou
