= Pavel Svoboda =

Czech politician and lawyer

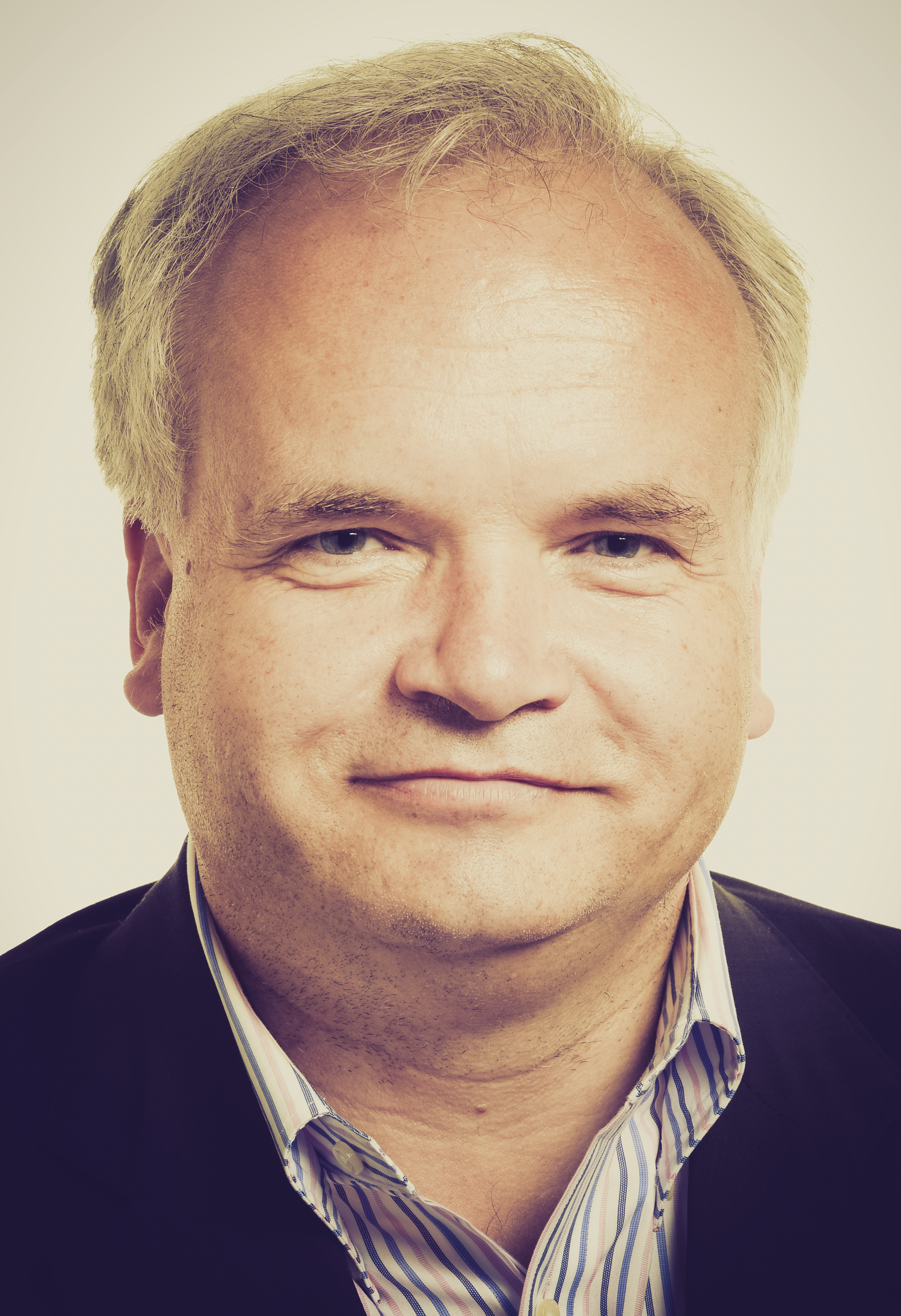

Czech Republic Ambassador to the Holy See, San Marino and Sovereign Military Order of Malta
- Incumbent
- Assumed office December 2024
- Preceded by: Václav Kolaja

Chair of the European Parliament Legal Affairs Committee
- In office 7 July 2014 – 1 July 2019
- Preceded by: Klaus-Heiner Lehne

Minister without Portfolio Chairman of the Legislative Council
- In office 23 January 2009 – 8 May 2009
- Prime Minister: Mirek Topolánek
- Preceded by: Cyril Svoboda
- Succeeded by: Daniela Kovářová

Member of the European Parliament
- In office 1 July 2014 – 1 July 2019
- Constituency: Czech Republic

Personal details
- Born: Pavel Svoboda; 9 April 1962 (age 64) Prague, Czechoslovakia (now Czech Republic)
- Party: KDU-ČSL
- Education: Charles University; Université Sciences Sociales in Toulouse

Pavel Svoboda (born 9 April 1962) is a Czech politician and lawyer and from 2014 to 2019 a Member of the European Parliament (MEP) from the Czech Republic for European People's Party representing KDU-ČSL.

== Early life and education ==
Svoboda was born in Prague and studied Law Faculty at Charles University. He also holds a D.E.A. degree from Université Sciences Sociales in Toulouse.

== Career ==
From 2007 to 2009, Svoboda was an Ambassador of the Czech Republic to the Council of Europe.

From 23 January 2009 to 8 May 2009, Svoboda was minister without portfolio and chairman of the Government's Legislative Council. In 2009, he was on the Czech government’s shortlist for the role of European Commissioner.

In May 2014 Svoboda was elected Member of the European Parliament for KDU-ČSL, part of European Peoples Party. Subsequently he was elected Chairman of the European Parliament Committee on Legal Affairs (JURI). He is also a member of the European Parliament Intergroup on Integrity (Transparency, Anti-Corruption and Organized Crime)
