= Pavel Poc =

Czech politician

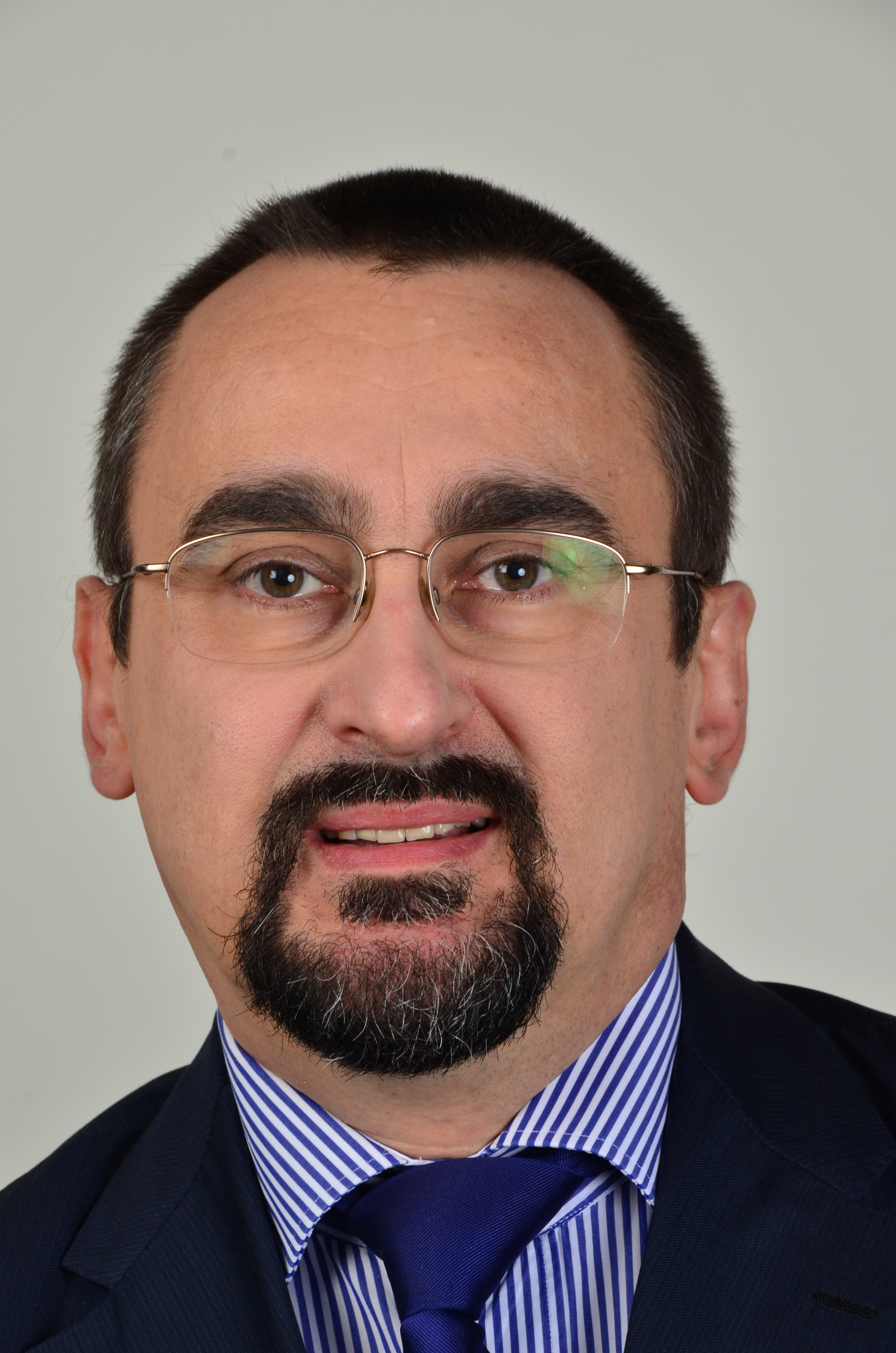
Poc in February 2014

Pavel Poc (born 26 May 1964, in Havlíčkův Brod) is a Czech politician, who served as a member of the European Parliament for two terms from 2009 to 2019, representing the Czech Social Democratic Party (ČSSD).

== Education ==
Poc studied biology at the Faculty of Science at Charles University in Prague, graduating in 1988 with a doctorate in natural science in the field of general biology. He studied environmental law at the Faculty of Law at Charles University from 1994–1995, and a Master of Public Administration at the University of Economics in Prague and the EHSAL Management School in Brussels in 1996.

== Career ==
Poc worked at the ethological laboratory of the Physiology Institute of the Czech Academy of Sciences in Prague until 1992, before working at the Mariánské Lázně municipal authority, initially as an ecologist, and from 1993 as head of the environmental department. He became a member of the board of directors of Chevak a.s. and Parking Centrum a.s. in Mariánské Lázně from 1998–2002, then commercial director, executive director and partner at Zahradní a parková spol. s r.o. from 2003–2009.

== Political career ==
Poc joined ČSSD in 1997, becoming vice-chair of the Mariánské Lázně ČSSD association in 1998, and a member of the party's Central Executive Committee in 2000. He became a member of the ČSSD Bureau in 2001, then guarantor of the central informatics commission from 2004–2005 and the central ecological commission from 2005–2006. He chaired the Regional Executive Committee of the Karlovy Vary Region from 2005–2010.
