= Buzek cabinet =

- 9th Cabinet of Poland
- 1997–2001
- Date formed: 31 October 1997
- Date dissolved: 19 October 2001

People and organisations
- President: Aleksander Kwaśniewski
- Prime Minister: Jerzy Buzek
- Deputy Prime Minister: Leszek Balcerowicz (1997-2000); Janusz Tomaszewski (1997-1999); Longin Komołowski Janusz Steinhoff
- Ministers removed: 11 resigned
- Total no. of members: 25
- Member party: Solidarity Electoral Action; Freedom Union (until 2000)
- Status in legislature: Majority (coalition) (1997–2000); Minority (2000–2001)
- Opposition party: Democratic Left Alliance; Polish People's Party; Movement for Reconstruction of Poland; Freedom Union (after 2000)
- Opposition leader: Leszek Miller

History
- Election: 1997 parliamentary election
- Predecessor: Cimoszewicz cabinet
- Successor: Miller

Cabinet of Jerzy Buzek was appointed on 31 October 1997 and passed the vote of confidence on 11 November 1997.

== The Cabinet ==
Office	Image	Name	Party	From	To
Prime Minister		Jerzy Buzek	Solidarity Electoral Action	31 October 1997	19 October 2001
Chairman of the Committee for European Integration		Jerzy Buzek	Solidarity Electoral Action	27 July 1998	19 October 2001
Deputy Prime Minister		Leszek Balcerowicz	Freedom Union	31 October 1997	8 June 2000
Minister of Finance		Leszek Balcerowicz	Freedom Union	31 October 1997	8 June 2000
Deputy Prime Minister		Janusz Tomaszewski	Solidarity Electoral Action	31 October 1997	3 September 1999
Minister of Interior and Administration		Janusz Tomaszewski	Solidarity Electoral Action	31 October 1997	3 September 1999
Deputy Prime Minister		Longin Komołowski	Solidarity Electoral Action	19 October 1999	19 October 2001
Minister Labour and Social Policy		Longin Komołowski	Solidarity Electoral Action	19 October 1999	19 October 2001
Deputy Prime Minister		Janusz Steinhoff	Agreement of Polish Christian Democrats	31 October 1997	19 October 2001
Minister of Economy		Janusz Steinhoff	Agreement of Polish Christian Democrats	12 June 2000	19 October 2001
Minister of Foreign Affairs		Bronisław Geremek	Freedom Union	31 October 1997	30 June 2000
Chairman of the Committee for European Integration		Ryszard Czarnecki	Christian National Union	31 October 1997	27 July 1998
Minister		Ryszard Czarnecki	Christian National Union	27 July 1998	26 October 1999
Minister of National Education		Mirosław Handke	Solidarity Electoral Action	31 October 1997	20 July 2000
Minister of Agriculture and Food Economy		Jacek Janiszewski	Conservative People's Party	31 October 1997	26 March 1999
Minister		Teresa kamińska	Solidarity Electoral Action	31 October 1997	26 March 1999
Minister		Jerzy Kropiwnicki	Christian National Union	31 October 1997	16 June 2000
Minister of Regional Development and Construction		Jerzy Kropiwnicki	Christian National Union	16 June 2000	19 October 2001
Minister of National Defence		Janusz Onyszkiewicz	Freedom Union	31 October 1997	16 June 2000
Minister of Transportation and Marine Economy		Eugeniusz Morawski	Freedom Union	31 October 1997	8 December 1998
Minister of Health and Welfare		Wojciech Maksymowicz	Solidarity Electoral Action	31 October 1997	26 March 1999
Minister		Janusz Pałubicki	Solidarity Electoral Action	31 October 1997	19 October 2001
Minister of Justice		Hanna Suchocka	Freedom Union	31 October 1997	8 June 2000
Minister of Environment Protection, Natural Resources and Forestry		Jan Szyszko	Centre Agreement	31 October 1997	19 October 1999
Minister		Wiesław Walendziak	Conservative People's Party	31 October 1997	26 March 1999
Minister of State Treasury		Emil Wąsacz	Solidarity Electoral Action	31 October 1997	16 August 2000
Minister of Transportation and Marine Economy		Tadeusz Syryjczyk	Freedom Union	8 December 1998	8 June 2000
Minister		Jerzy Widzyk	Solidarity Electoral Action	31 October 1997	26 March 1999
Minister of Transportation and Marine Economy		Jerzy Widzyk	Solidarity Electoral Action	12 June 2000	19 October 2001
State Committee for Scientific Research		Andrzej Wiszniewski	Solidarity Electoral Action	31 October 1997	19 October 2001
Minister of Science		Andrzej Wiszniewski	Solidarity Electoral Action	19 October 1999	19 October 2001
Minister of Culture and Art		Joanna Wnuk-Nazarowa	Freedom Union	31 October 1997	26 March 1999
Minister of Communication		Marek Zdrojewski	Christian National Union	31 October 1997	26 March 1999
Minister of Agriculture and Food Economy		Artur Balazs	Conservative People's Party	26 March 1999	19 October 1999
Minister of Agriculture and Rural Development		Artur Balazs	Conservative People's Party	19 October 1999	19 October 2001
Minister of Health and Welfare		Franciszka Cegielska	Conservative People's Party	26 March 1999	19 October 1999
Minister of Health		Franciszka Cegielska	Conservative People's Party	19 October 1999	22 October 2000
Minister of Culture and Art		Andrzej Zakrzewski	Conservative People's Party	26 March 1999	19 October 1999
Minister of Culture and National Heritage		Andrzej Zakrzewski	Conservative People's Party	19 October 1999	10 February 2000
Minister of Communication		Maciej Srebro	Christian National Union	26 March 1999	16 March 2000
Minister of Environment		Antoni Tokarczuk	Agreement of Polish Christian Democrats	19 October 1999	19 October 2001
Minister of Interior and Administration		Marek Biernacki	Solidarity Electoral Action	7 October 1999	19 October 2001
Minister of Culture and National Heritage		Kazimierz Michał Ujazdowski	Right Alliance	16 March 2000	12 July 2001
Minister of Communicat		Tomasz Szyszko	Right Alliance	16 March 2000	19 July 2001
Minister of Justice		Lech Kaczyński	Law and Justice	12 June 2000	5 July 2001
Minister of National Defence		Bronisław Komorowski	Conservative People's Party	16 June 2000	19 October 2001
Minister of Finance		Jarosław Bauc	Solidarity Electoral Action	12 June 2000	28 August 2001
Minister of Foreign Affairs		Władysław Bartoszewski	Solidarity Electoral Action	30 June 2000	19 October 2001
Minister of National Education		Edmund Wittbrodt	Solidarity Electoral Action	20 July 2000	19 October 2001
Minister of State Treasury		Andrzej Chronowski	Solidarity Electoral Action	16 August 2000	28 February 2001
Minister of Health		Grzegorz Opala	Solidarity Electoral Action	7 November 2000	19 October 2001
Minister of State Treasury		Aldona Kamela-Sowińska	Solidarity Electoral Action	28 February 2001	19 October 2001
Minister of Culture and National Heritage		Andrzej Zieliński	Solidarity Electoral Action	12 July 2001	19 October 2001
Minister of Justice		Stanisław Iwanicki	Solidarity Electoral Action	5 July 2001	19 October 2001
Minister of Finance		Halina Wasilewska-Trenkner	Solidarity Electoral Action	28 August 2001	19 October 2001
