= Ministry of Culture and National Heritage =

Government ministry of Poland

- Ministerstwo Kultury i Dziedzictwa Narodowego
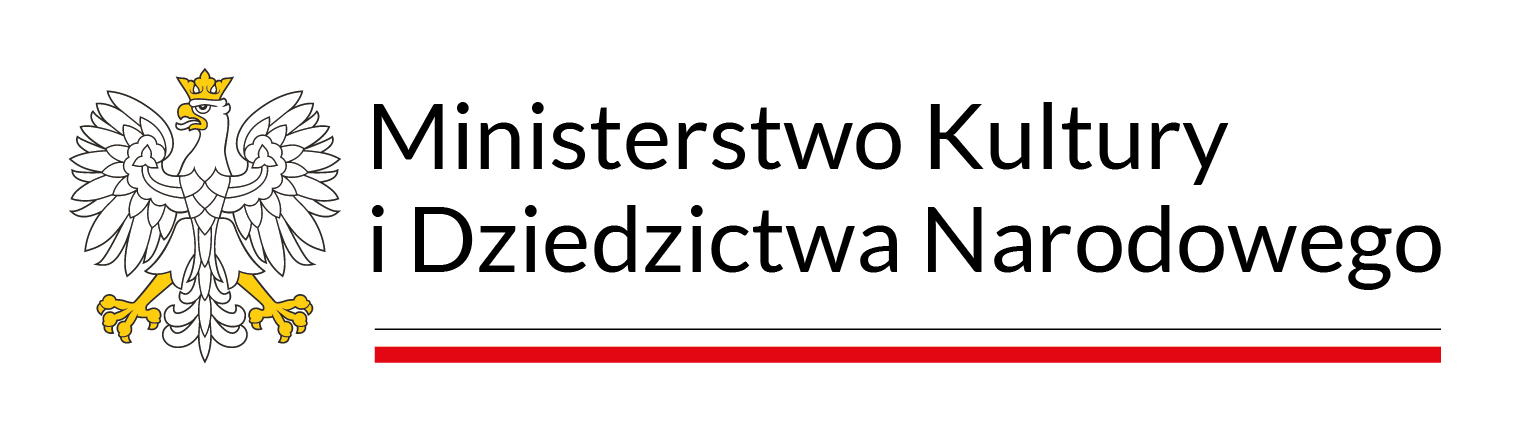
- Ministerial logotype

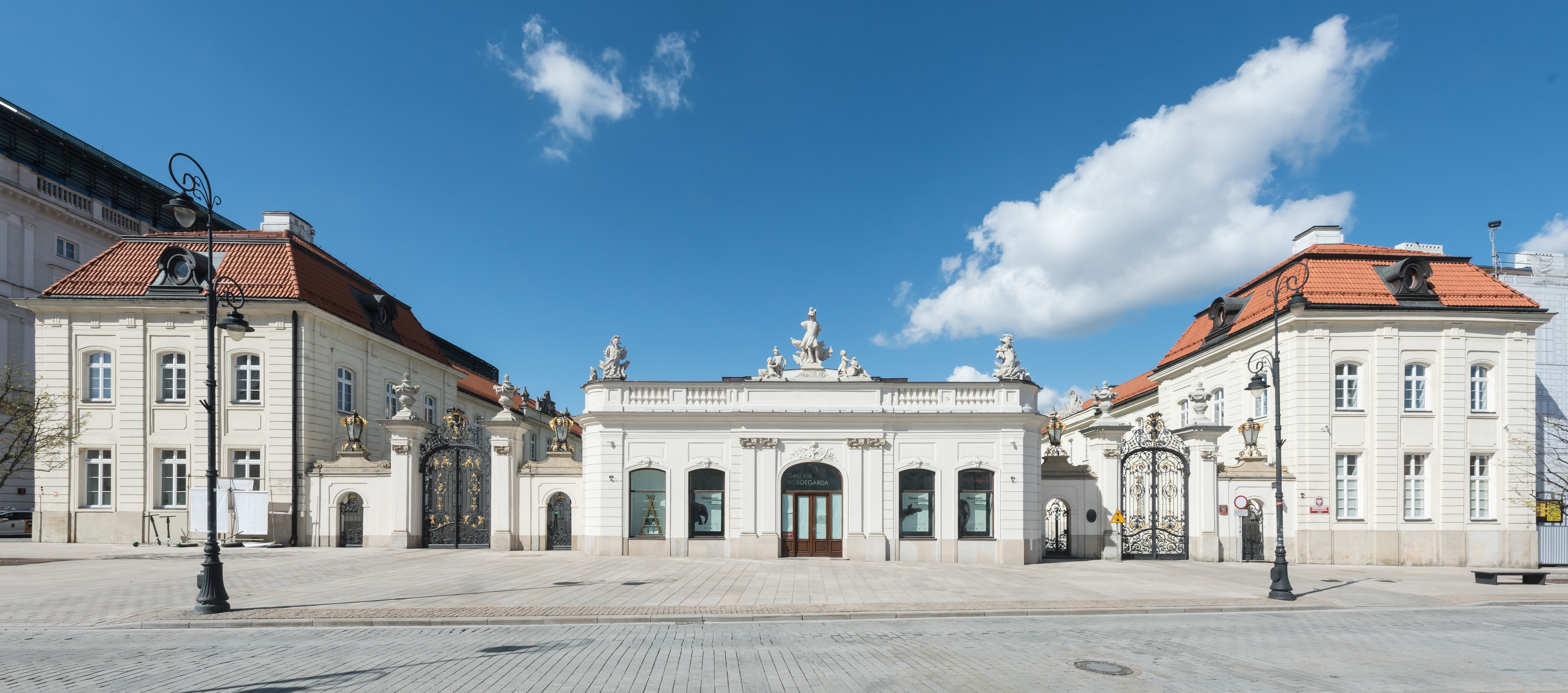
- Ministry headquarters

Ministry overview
- Headquarters: Potocki Palace, 15 Krakowskie Przedmieście Street, Warsaw
- Annual budget: PLN 4.029 billion
- Minister responsible: Marta Cienkowska, Minister of Culture and National Heritage
- Secretaries of State responsible: Bożena Żelazowska, Secretary of State, General Inspector of Monuments; Maciej Wróbel, Secretary of State; Sławomir Rogowski, Undersecretary of State
- Ministry executive: Dorota Żebrowska, Director General
- Parent department: Council of Ministers
- Website: www.gov.pl/web/kultura

Footnotes
- Leadership officials source

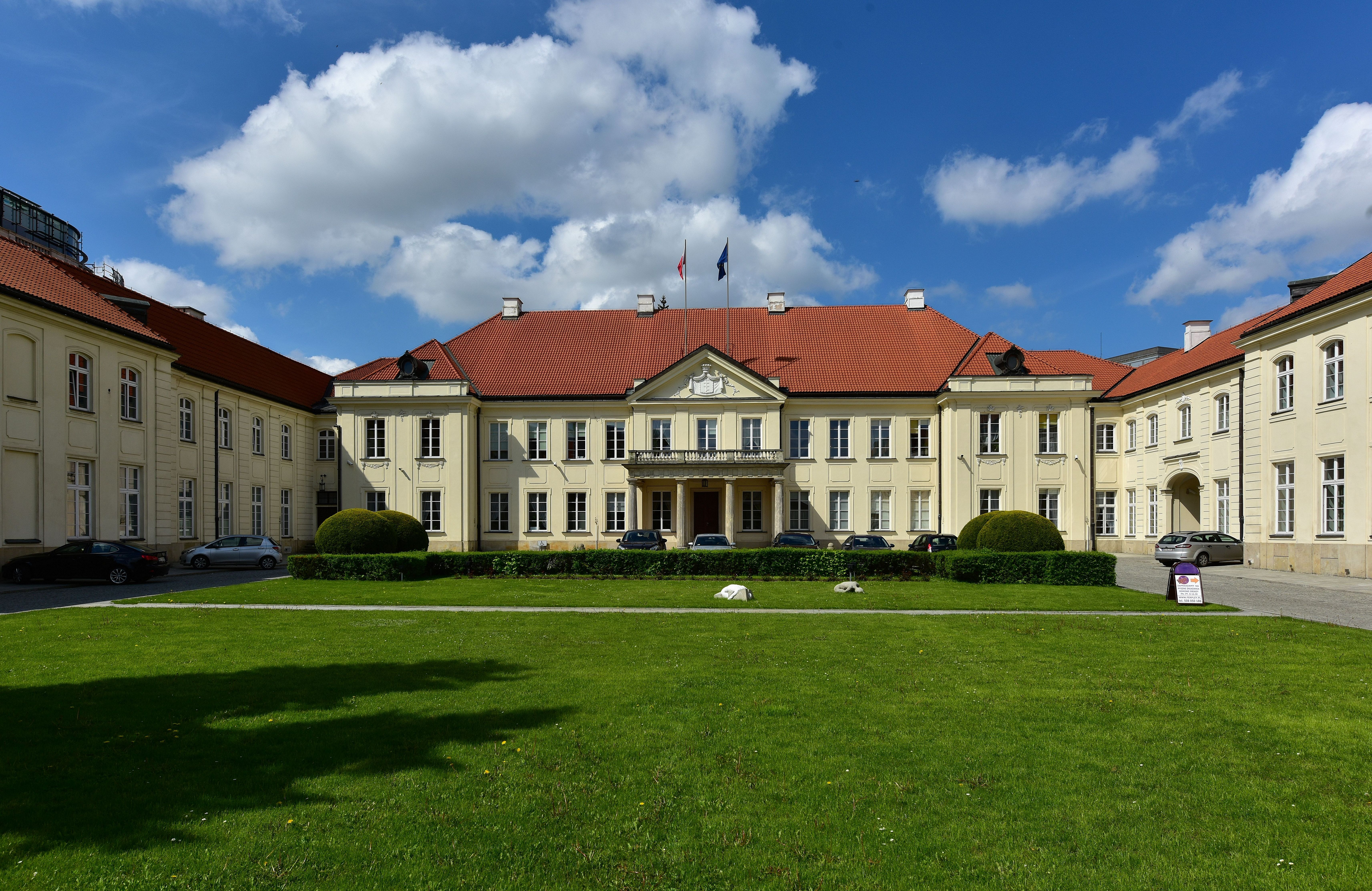
Seat of the Ministry – the main palace building

The Ministry of Culture and National Heritage (Polish: Ministerstwo Kultury i Dziedzictwa Narodowego) is a ministry within Polish government. It is responsible for national heritage preservation and Polish culture promotion. Ministry oversees state or partially state cultural institutions and implements the law regarding art and cultural property. The ministry headquarters is located at Potocki Palace, 15 Krakowskie Przedmieście Street in Warsaw. Incumbent minister has been Marta Cienkowska since July 24, 2025.

== History ==
It was formed on 31 October 2005, from the transformation of the Ministry of Culture of the Republic of Poland. The ministry can trace its history back to 1918 when the Ministry of Art and Culture was established. It was suppressed in 1922 due to the rationalisation of public expenses and structural reform of the government. It was reestablished within the temporary communist government in 1944 and has existed continuously henceforth until the merger with the Ministry of Sport in 2021.

== List of ministers ==
Portrait	Name	Party	Term of offices		Prime minister (cabinet)
Ministers of Culture and Art
	Medard Downarowicz	SNN	17 November 1918	16 January 1919	Jędrzej Moraczewski
	Zenon Przesmycki	nonpartisan	16 January 1919	9 December 1919	Ignacy Jan Paderewski
	Jan Fryderyk Heurich	nonpartisan	24 June 1920	11 August 1921	Władysław Grabski Wincenty Witos
	Maciej Rataj	PSL „Piast”	11 August 1921	13 September 1921	Wincenty Witos
	Antoni Ponikowski	PSChD	19 September 1921	5 March 1922	Antoni Ponikowski
Ministers of Culture and Art in Poland under Communism (1944–89)
	Wincenty Rzymowski	SD	21 July 1944	2 May 1945	Polish Committee of National Liberation
	Edmund Zalewski	SL	2 May 1945	28 June 1945	Provisional Government of National Unity
	Władysław Kowalski	SL	28 June 1945	5 February 1947	Provisional Government of National Unity
	Stefan Dybowski	SL/ZSL	6 February 1947	20 November 1952	Józef Cyrankiewicz (Cyrankiewicz I)
	Włodzimierz Sokorski	PZPR	21 November 1952	19 April 1956	Bolesław Bierut (Bierut)
	Karol Kuryluk	PZPR	19 April 1956	29 April 1958	Józef Cyrankiewicz (Cyrankiewicz II)
	Kazimierz Rusinek (acting)	PZPR	3 May 1958	2 July 1958	Józef Cyrankiewicz (Cyrankiewicz III)
	Tadeusz Galiński	PZPR	2 July 1958	12 December 1964	Józef Cyrankiewicz (Cyrankiewicz IV)
	Lucjan Motyka	PZPR	12 December 1964	26 October 1971	Józef Cyrankiewicz (Cyrankiewicz V)
	Czesław Wiśniewski (acting)	PZPR	26 October 1971	22 December 1971	Józef Cyrankiewicz (Cyrankiewicz V)
	Stanisław Wroński	PZPR	22 December 1971	16 February 1974	Piotr Jaroszewicz (Jaroszewicz I)
	Józef Tejchma	PZPR	16 February 1974	26 January 1978	Piotr Jaroszewicz (Jaroszewicz II)
	Janusz Wilhelmi (acting)	PZPR	26 January 1978	16 March 1978	Piotr Jaroszewicz (Jaroszewicz II)
	Jan Mietkowski	PZPR	29 March 1978	4 July 1978	Piotr Jaroszewicz (Jaroszewicz II)
	Zygmunt Najdowski	PZPR	20 July 1978	8 October 1980	Piotr Jaroszewicz (Jaroszewicz II)
	Józef Tejchma	PZPR	8 October 1980	9 October 1982	Edward Babiuch (Babiuch) Józef Pińkowski (Pińkowski) Wojciech Jaruzelski (Jaruzelski)
	Kazimierz Żygulski	nonpartisan	9 October 1982	29 September 1986	Wojciech Jaruzelski (Jaruzelski) Zbigniew Messner (Messner)
	Aleksander Krawczuk	nonpartisan	29 September 1986	1 August 1989	Zbigniew Messner (Messner) Mieczysław Rakowski (Rakowski)
Ministers of Culture and Art (1989–1999)
	Izabella Cywińska	nonpartisan	12 September 1989	12 January 1991	Tadeusz Mazowiecki (Mazowiecki)
	Marek Rostworowski	nonpartisan	12 January 1991	23 December 1991	Jan Krzysztof Bielecki (Bielecki)
	Andrzej Siciński	nonpartisan	23 December 1991	11 July 1992	Jan Olszewski (Olszewski)
	Piotr Łukasiewicz (acting)	nonpartisan	11 July 1992	17 February 1993	Hanna Suchocka (Suchocka)
	Jerzy Góral	Christian National Union	17 February 1993	26 October 1993	Hanna Suchocka (Suchocka)
	Kazimierz Dejmek	nonpartisan	26 October 1993	26 January 1996	Waldemar Pawlak (Pawlak II) Józef Oleksy (Oleksy)
	Zdzisław Podkański	Polish People's Party	15 February 1996	31 October 1997	Włodzimierz Cimoszewicz (Cimoszewicz)
	Joanna Wnuk-Nazarowa	Freedom Union	31 October 1997	26 March 1998	Jerzy Buzek (Buzek)
	Andrzej Zakrzewski	Conservative People's Party	26 March 1998	19 October 1999	Jerzy Buzek (Buzek)
Ministers of Culture and National Heritage (1999–2001)
	Andrzej Zakrzewski	Conservative People's Party	19 October 1999	10 February 2000	Jerzy Buzek (Buzek)
	Kazimierz Michał Ujazdowski	Conservative People's Party	10 February 2000	12 July 2001	Jerzy Buzek (Buzek)
	Andrzej Zieliński	nonpartisan	12 July 2001	19 October 2001	Jerzy Buzek (Buzek)
Ministers of Culture (2001–2005)
	Andrzej Celiński	Democratic Left Alliance	19 October 2001	6 July 2002	Leszek Miller (Miller)
	Waldemar Dąbrowski	nonpartisan	6 July 2002	31 October 2005	Leszek Miller (Miller) Marek Belka (Belka I, Belka II)
Ministers of Culture and National Heritage (2005–Present)
	Kazimierz Michał Ujazdowski	Law and Justice	31 October 2005	7 September 2007	Kazimierz Marcinkiewicz (Marcinkiewicz) Jarosław Kaczyński (Kaczyński)
	Jarosław Kaczyński (acting)	Law and Justice	7 September 2007	12 September 2007	Jarosław Kaczyński (Kaczyński)
	Kazimierz Michał Ujazdowski	Law and Justice	12 September 2007	16 November 2007	Jarosław Kaczyński (Kaczyński)
	Bogdan Zdrojewski	Civic Platform	16 November 2007	14 June 2014	Donald Tusk (Tusk I, Tusk II)
	Małgorzata Omilanowska	nonpartisan	14 June 2014	16 November 2015	Donald Tusk (Tusk II) Ewa Kopacz (Kopacz)
	Piotr Gliński	Law and Justice	16 November 2015	27 November 2023	Beata Szydło (Szydło) Mateusz Morawiecki (Morawiecki, Morawiecki II)
	Dominika Chorosińska	Law and Justice	27 November 2023	13 December 2023	Mateusz Morawiecki (Morawiecki III)
	Bartłomiej Sienkiewicz	Civic Platform	13 December 2023	13 May 2024	Donald Tusk (Tusk III)
	Hanna Wróblewska	Nonpartisan	13 May 2024	24 July 2025	Donald Tusk (Tusk III)
	Marta Cienkowska	Poland 2050	24 July 2025	Incumbent	Donald Tusk (Tusk III)
