= Zbigniew Eysmont =

Polish politician and artist (1949–2025)

Member of the Sejm of Poland
- In office 25 November 1991 – 29 May 1993
- Constituency: 50
- In office 11 November 2000 – 18 October 2001
- Constituency: 1

Member minister of the Council of Ministers
- In office 11 July 1992 – 26 October 1993
- Prime Minister: Hanna Suchocka

Member of the Masovian Voivodeship Sejmik
- In office 1998–2002

Personal details
- Born: 4 December 1949 Warsaw, Poland
- Died: 3 March 2025 (aged 75) Warsaw, Poland
- Party: Polish Beer-Lovers' Party; Polish Liberal Programme; Nonpartisan Bloc for Support of Reforms; Solidarity Electoral Action; Conservative People's Party; Civic Platform
- Education: Academy of Fine Arts in Warsaw
- Occupation: Politician; Artist; Restaurateur

Zbigniew Antoni Eysmont (Polish: [ˈzbi.ɡɲɛf anˈtɔ.ɲi ɛˈɘ̟sm.ɔnt]; 4 December 1949 – 3 March 2025) was a Polish politician, artist, and restaurateur. He was a member of the Sejm of Poland from 1991 to 1993, and from 2000 to 2001, the member minister of the Council of Ministers from 1992 to 1993, and a member of the Masovian Voivodeship Sejmik from 1998 to 2002. Throughout his career, he belonged to Polish Beer-Lovers' Party, Polish Liberal Programme, Nonpartisan Bloc for Support of Reforms, Solidarity Electoral Action, Conservative People's Party, and Civic Platform.

== Biography ==
Zbigniew Eysmont was born on 4 December 1949 in Warsaw, Poland. In 1974, he graduated from the Academy of Fine Arts in Warsaw, with a degree in art design. In 1991, he was elected as a member of the Sejm of Poland, as the Polish Beer-Lovers' Party candidate. He represented the constituency no. 50, consisting of the Wrocław Voivodeship. In 1992, he joined the parliamentary group Polish Liberal Programme. From 11 July 1992 to 26 October 1993, he served as the member minister of the Council of Ministers for the entrepreneurship matters, in the cabinet of Hanna Suchocka. He unsuccessfully ran for reelection in 1993, as the Nonpartisan Bloc for Support of Reforms candidate.

From 1998 to 2002, Eysmont was a member of the Masovian Voivodeship Sejmik, and in 2000, he was again elected to the Sejm, as the Solidarity Electoral Action candidate, replacing Andrzej Zakrzewski, who died in office. He represented constituency no. 1, consisting of the city of Warsaw. He was also a member of the Conservative People's Party. In 2001, Eysmont unsuccessfully ran for the election to the Sejm as the Civic Platform candidate. In 2002, he retired from politics, becoming a restaurant owner. He died on 3 March 2025 in Warsaw.
