= March 2011 President of European Conservatives and Reformists election =

- 8 March 2011
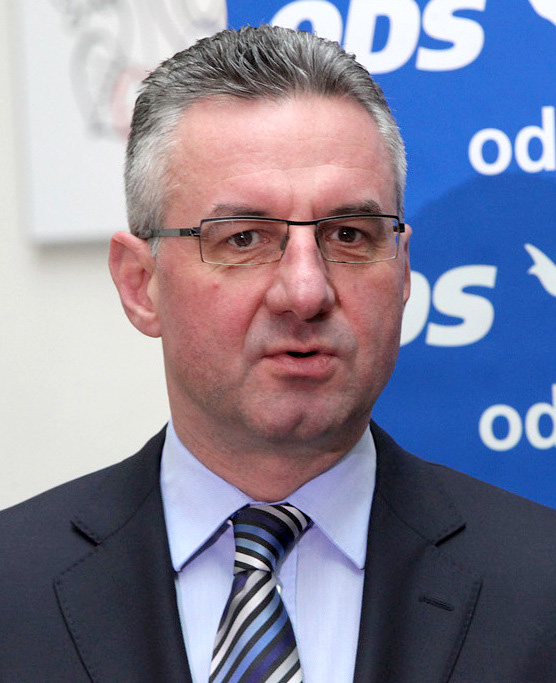

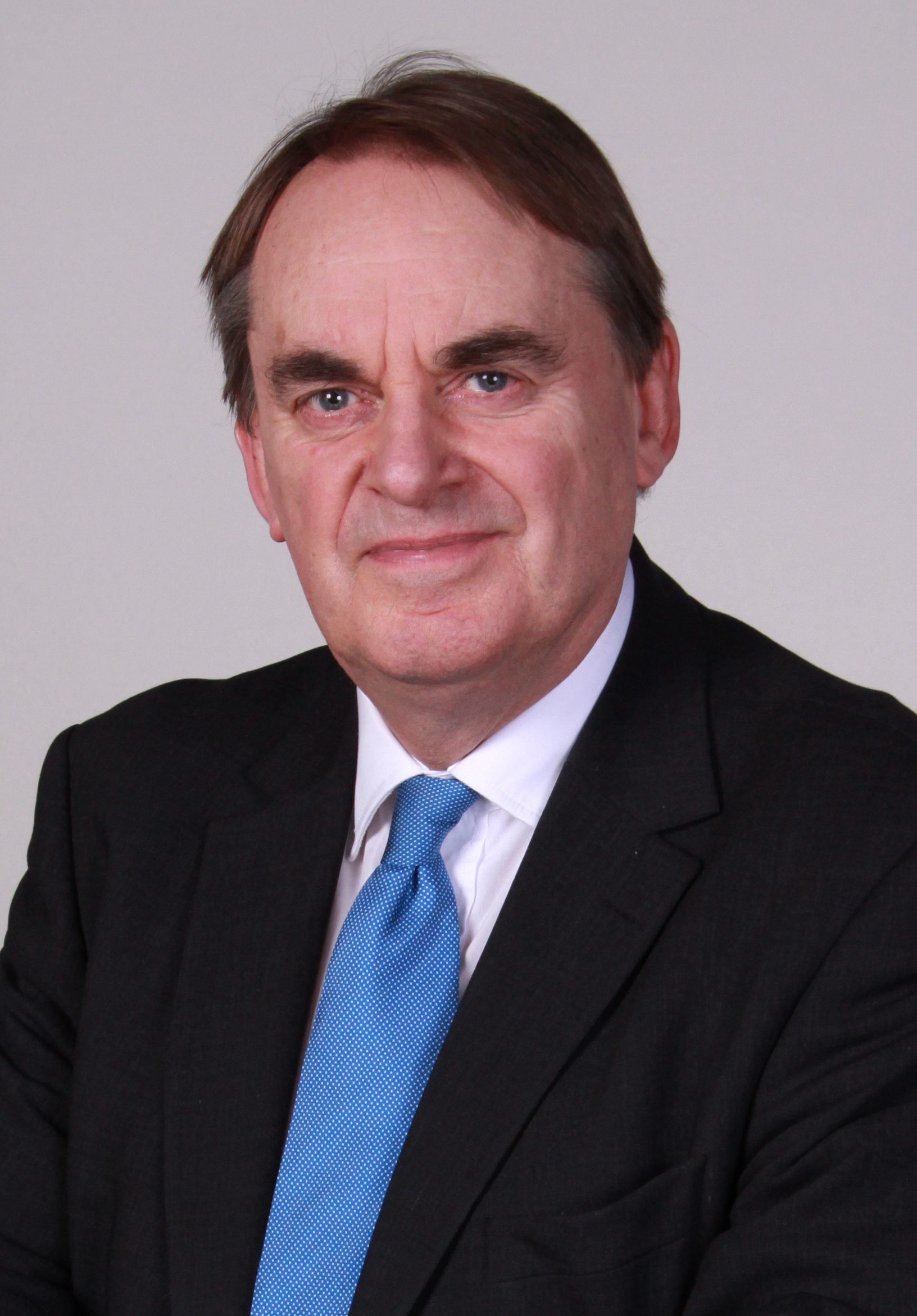

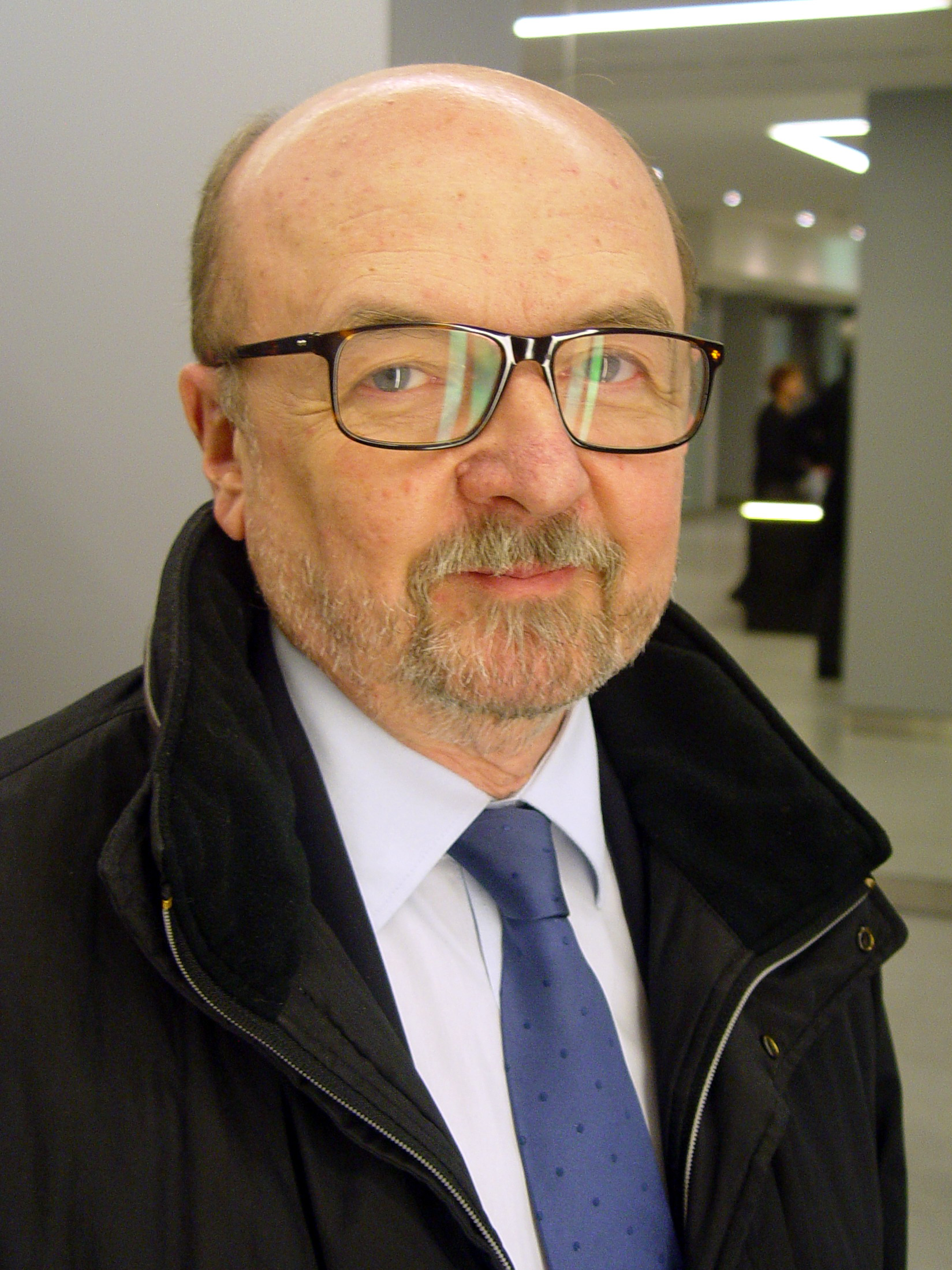
Candidate	Jan Zahradil	Timothy Kirkhope	Ryszard Legutko
Party	ODS	Conservative	PiS
Popular vote	36	18	withdrawn
Percentage	66.67%	33.33%
President of ECR before election
Michal Kaminski
PiS
Elected President of ECR
Jan Zahradil
ODS

Election of the President of European Conservatives and Reformists was held on 8 March 2011. Election was held after the previous president Michal Kaminski quit the group. Candidates included Czech MEP Jan Zahradil, British MEP Timothy Kirkhope and Polish MEP Ryszard Legutko. Kirkhope was considered the favourite to become the new president as the Conservative Party dominated the group. He was defeated by Zahradil who became the new president.

== Background ==
Michal Kaminski was elected the President of European Conservatives and Reformists in 2009. He was a member of the Polish Law and Justice party. His party was accused of far-right politics. He resigned in January 2011 after having faced 'aggression' and 'hatred' from his colleagues in the party.

On 28 January 2011, member of Czech Civic Democratic Party Jan Zahradil announced his candidacy. Zahradil started to seek support for his candidacy. He stated that he would try to attract more deputies to the group and improve its communication strategy if he becomes the new president. Zahradil was supported by the Czech Prime Minister Petr Nečas.

Timothy Kirkhope stated on the same day that he might seek Conservative Party nomination for the president.

Polish MEP Ryszard Legutko announced his candidacy on 17 February 2011. His candidacy has put the Law and Justice party on a collision course with British MEPs. Legutko's candidacy caused controversy due to his views on Gay rights.

== Candidates ==
- Timothy Kirkhope, British MEP and member of Conservative Party. He was the most Pro-European candidate and the least controversial. He is a former Minister of British government and an experienced politician.
- Ryszard Legutko, Polish MEP and a member of Law and Justice. His candidacy was considered very controversial, and he is known for negative opinions of homosexual rights.
- Jan Zahradil, Czech MEP and member of the Civic Democratic Party (ODS). He is known to be a protégé of the Czech President Vaclav Klaus and the leading climate change denier in the Parliament. He actively promoted documentary ‘The Great Global Warming Swindle’.

== ECR Group members ==
All 54 MEPs who were members of ECR were allowed to vote.

Party	Country	MEPs
Conservative Party (CP)	United Kingdom	25 / 54
Law and Justice (PiS)	Poland	15 / 54
Civic Democratic Party (ODS)	Czech Republic	9 / 54
Electoral Action of Poles in Lithuania – Christian Families Alliance (LLRA)	Lithuania	1 / 54
For Fatherland and Freedom/LNNK (TB/LNNK)	Latvia	1 / 54
List Dedecker (LDD)	Belgium	1 / 54
Christian Union (CU)	Netherlands	1 / 54
Hungarian Democratic Forum (MDF)	Hungary	1 / 54
Overall	European Union	54 / 736

== Voting ==
Candidaty	Party	Country	Votes	
Jan Zahradil	Civic Democratic Party (ODS)	Czech Republic	36	66.67%
Timothy Kirkhope	Conservative Party (CP)	United Kingdom	18	33.33%
Ryszard Legutko	Law and Justice (PiS)	Poland	withdrawn	

Legutko withdraw from the election in last minutes. Kirkhope was expected to win majority of 54 MEPs but he received only 18 votes while Zahradil 36. Zahradil thus became the new president.

== Afterwards ==
The result was considered a defeat to Conservative Party and British Prime Minister David Cameron. Prominent members of the Labour Party used the result to attack Cameron.

Zahradil became the first Czech to be a president of a group in European parliament. The Civic Democratic Party considered the result a huge success. Zahradil's term was only contemporary as it would end in December 2011. Zahradil decided to not seek reelection. Zahradil instead ran for leadership of Alliance of European Conservatives and Reformists.
