= Kazimierz Michał Ujazdowski =

Polish politician (born 1964)

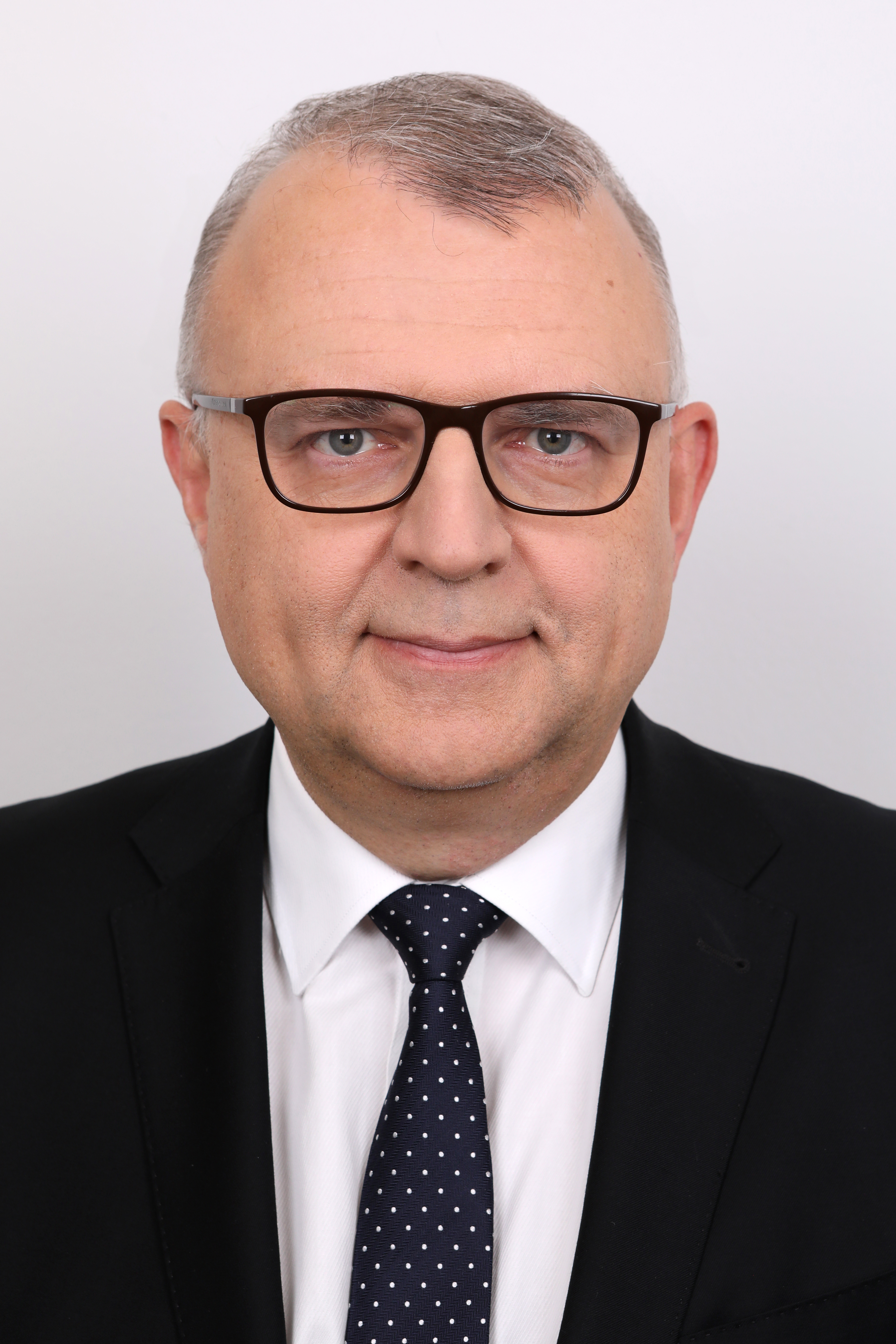

Senate Chair of the Committee on Emigration and Liaison with Poles Abroad
- Incumbent
- Assumed office 12 November 2019
- Deputy: Maria Koc (PiS); Janina Sagatowska (PiS); Wojciech Ziemniak (KO)
- Preceded by: Janina Sagatowska

Minister of Culture and National Heritage
- In office 31 October 2005 – 16 November 2007
- President: Aleksander Kwaśniewski; Lech Kaczyński
- Prime Minister: Kazimierz Marcinkiewicz; Jarosław Kaczyński
- Preceded by: Waldemar Dąbrowski
- Succeeded by: Bogdan Zdrojewski
- In office 16 March 2000 – 12 July 2001
- President: Aleksander Kwaśniewski
- Prime Minister: Jerzy Buzek
- Preceded by: Andrzej Zakrzewski
- Succeeded by: Andrzej Zieliński

Member of the Sejm
- In office 20 October 1997 – 27 May 2014
- Constituency: 3 – Wrocław
- In office 25 November 1991 – 31 May 1993

Member of the European Parliament
- In office 1 July 2014 – 1 July 2019

Member of the Senate
- Incumbent
- Assumed office 12 November 2019
- Preceded by: Barbara Borys-Damięcka
- Constituency: 44-Warsaw

Personal details
- Born: 28 July 1964 (age 61) Kielce, Poland
- Party: Law and Justice (2002–2017)
- Spouse: Lidia Ujazdowska

Kazimierz Michał Ujazdowski (born 28 July 1964 in Kielce) is a Polish politician and lawyer, associate professor of law at the University of Łódź. Minister of Culture and National Heritage in the governments of Jerzy Buzek (2000–2001), Kazimierz Marcinkiewicz (2005–2006) and Jarosław Kaczyński (2006–2007), deputy speaker of the Sejm of the fourth term. Member of the Sejm of the 1st (1991–1993) and of the 3rd, 4th, 5th, 6th and 7th term (1997–2014), Member of the European Parliament of the 8th term (2014–2019), senator of the 10th term (from 2019).

Author of press publications, as well as the author, co-author and editor of books on cultural policy, politics of memory, political and constitutional issues, history of Polish conservatism and conservative thought. He has written for Rzeczpospolita, Gazeta Wyborcza, Dziennik, Wprost, Gazeta Polska, Gość Niedzielny, Nowe Państwo and Życie. Ujazdowski was a member of the editorial board of Polityka Polska (1990–1991). He launched and edited Kwartalnik Konserwatywny. He is also the founder and director of the European Center for Constitutional Research (Europejskie Centrum Badań Ustrojowych) at the University of Łódź. In June 2021, he co-founded, with Marek Biernacki and others, the think tank Centrum Dobrego Państwa.

On 13 October 2022, Ujazdowski launched the Centre for Poland as a political party, which will be part of the Polish Coalition.

He was born into a family of attorneys: his father Kazimierz Mieczysław Ujazdowski, a Member of Parliament, acted for the defence in political trials during the martial law period, and his grandfather Kazimierz Cyprian Ujazdowski represented defendants during the Brest trials.

Ujazdowski is a member of Opus Dei.

== See also ==
- Members of Polish Sejm 2005-2007
- Przymierze Prawicy
- Koalicja Konserwatywna
