= Nelli Rokita =

Polish politician

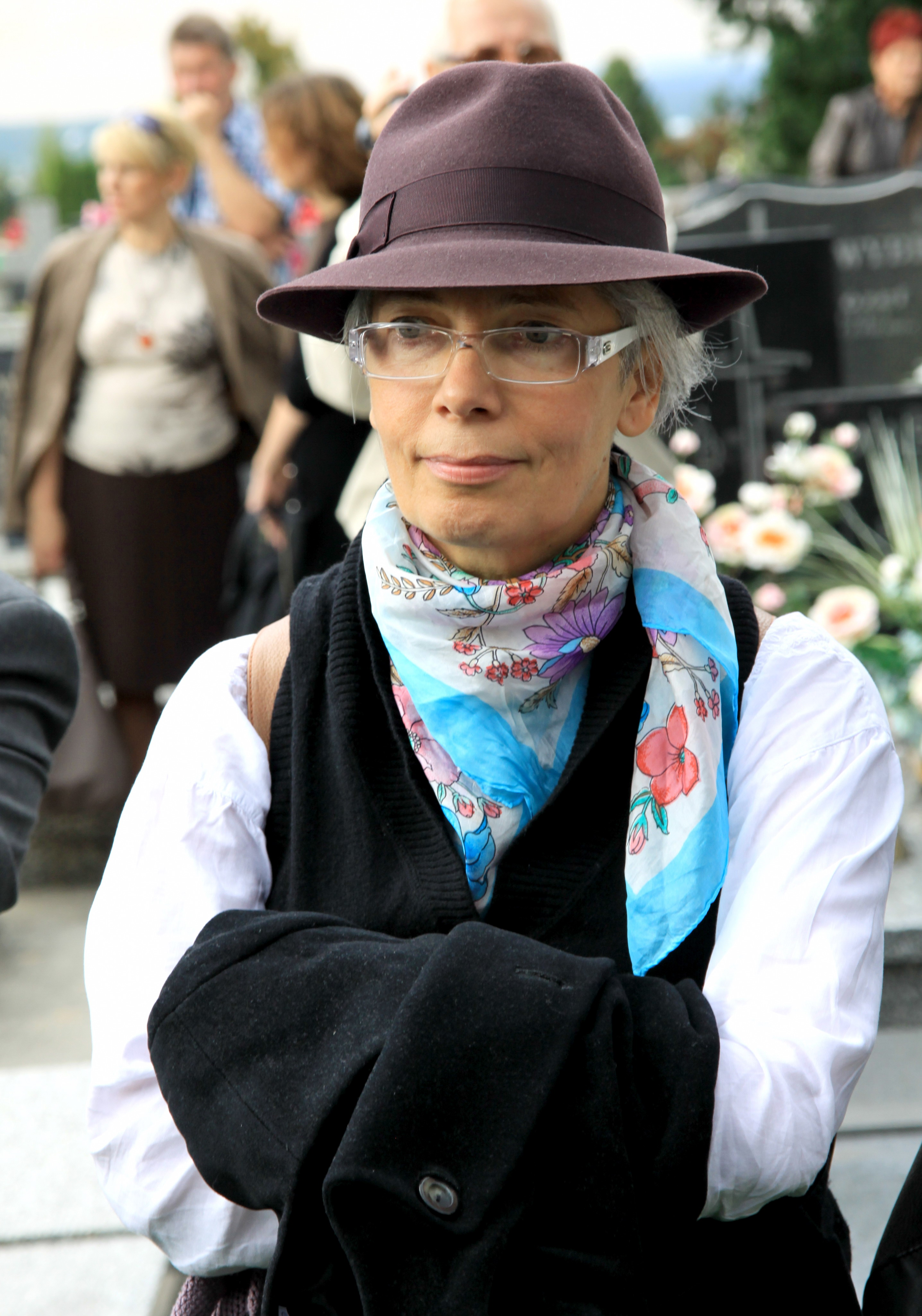

Personal details
- Born: Nelli Arnold; 26 June 1957 (age 68) Chelyabinsk, USSR
- Party: Law and Justice
- Spouse: Jan Rokita

Nelli Rokita (née Nelli Arnold; 26 June 1957) is a Polish politician who was elected an MP as a Law and Justice candidate. Her husband Jan Rokita was a prominent activist of a Civic Platform who retreated in September 2007 when Rokita started her political career. She was born in the Soviet Union in an ethnic German family, lived in Germany, where she obtained a university degree in Slavic studies. Rokita first visited Poland in the 1980s on a scholarship to the Jagiellonian University to study the language of political propaganda in the People's Republic of Poland. There she met Jan Rokita, whom she married on 26 July 1994. He is her second husband. Before their wedding, Rokita converted to Catholicism, and her future husband became her godfather. She also has a daughter, Kasia, from her previous marriage.

During her time in Poland, Rokita edited the official party newspaper of the Conservative People's Party (Poland). She became a member of the Civic Platform, but withdrew from the party in January 2007, claiming that her husband was marginalized in his own party by Donald Tusk, and that the liberal-conservative party was becoming increasingly left-wing. Rokita briefly served as an advisor to Poland's president Lech Kaczyński on women's issues. From 2007 to 2011, Nelli Rokita was a member of the Sejm. She lost the 2011 election to the Polish Senate.
