= Krawczuk =

Krawczuk is a surname. Notable people with the surname include:

- Łukasz Krawczuk (born 1989), Polish sprinter
- Aleksander Krawczuk (1922–2023), Polish historian and academic
- Elżbieta Anna Krawczuk-Trylińska (1960–2017), Polish athlete
