= Piotr Łukasiewicz =

Piotr Łukasiewicz may refer to:

- Piotr Łukasiewicz (sociologist) (born 1954), sociologist, Acting Minister of Culture and Art of Poland (1992–1993)
- Piotr Łukasiewicz (diplomat) (born 1972), diplomat, Polish ambassador to Afghanistan (2012–2014)
