= Janusz Kamiński (politician) =

Polish politician (1933–2026)

Minister of Transport, Navigation and Communications
- In office 23 October 1987 – 1 August 1989
- Prime Minister: Zbigniew Messner; Mieczysław Rakowski
- Preceded by: Władysław Majewski
- Succeeded by: Franciszek Wielądek

Minister of Communications
- In office 31 October 1981 – 24 October 1987
- Prime Minister: Wojciech Jaruzelski; Zbigniew Messner
- Preceded by: Mieczysław Zajfryd
- Succeeded by: Position abolished

Personal details
- Born: 13 November 1933 Siedlce, Poland
- Died: 12 April 2026 (aged 92)
- Party: PZPR
- Education: Warsaw University of Technology
- Occupation: Engineer

Janusz Kamiński (13 November 1933 – 12 April 2026) was a Polish politician. A member of the Polish United Workers' Party, he served as Ministry of Transport, Navigation and Communications from 1987 to 1989.

Kamiński died on 12 April 2026, at the age of 92.
