= Jan Rokita =

Polish politician

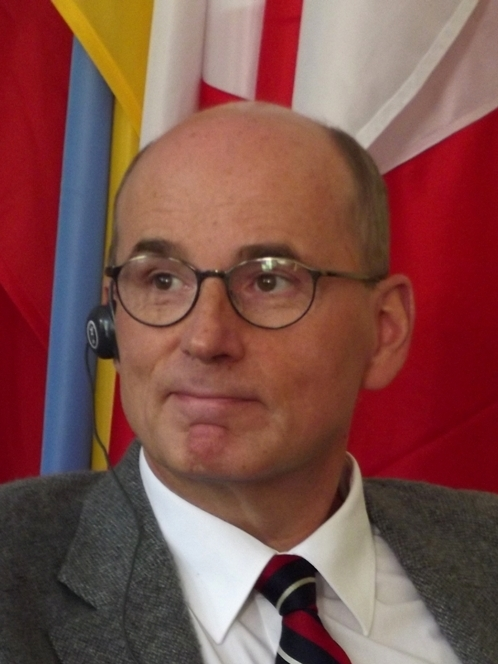

Member of the Sejm
- In office 18 June 1989 – 4 November 2007
- Parliamentary group: Civic Parliamentary Club (1989–1991); Democratic Union (1991–1995); Freedom Union (1995–1997); Solidarity Electoral Action (1997–2001); Civic Platform (2001–2005)

Parliamentary Leader of the Civic Platform 3rd Leader of the Civic Platform in the Sejm
- In office 1 June 2003 – 5 November 2005
- Leader: Donald Tusk
- Preceded by: Maciej Płażyński
- Succeeded by: Donald Tusk

Personal details
- Born: 18 June 1959 (age 67) Kraków, Poland
- Party: Civic Platform
- Spouse: Nelly Rokita
- Education: Jagiellonian University

Jan Władysław Maria Rokita (Polish pronunciation: [ˈjan rɔˈkʲita], born 18 June 1959) is a Polish liberal conservative politician, a member of the Sejm, the lower chamber of the Polish parliament. He was chairman of the parliamentary club of the Civic Platform party from 2003 to 2005.

He was a Member of the Sejm in X, I, II, III, IV I V convocations, co-founder of the Conservative People's Party and its president in 2000–2002.

== Biography ==
Jan Rokita was born in Kraków as a son of Tadeusz Rokita and Adela Wajdowicz. His maternal grandmother, Maria Meder, was Austrian.

Rokita graduated from the Jagiellonian University in Kraków with a degree in law. He joined the dissident organisation "Freedom and Peace". He also took part in the Independent Students Union and was active as a member of the academic branch of Solidarity. For his activity in the opposition, he was banned from becoming an apprentice attorney, despite his excellent examination record.

In 1989, he was elected an MP as a Solidarity candidate. He was appointed the president of a special parliamentary commission for the investigation of the Security Service (Służba Bezpieczeństwa). In 1991, he joined Democratic Union (UD) party. He was a member of the party's right wing.

In Hanna Suchocka's government, he was the chief of the Council of Ministers office. In 1995, he was the co-founder of the "3/4 initiative" – a movement created in order to prevent Aleksander Kwaśniewski from winning the presidential elections and refused to support his party's candidate Jacek Kuroń.

In 1997, he left Freedom Union (successor of the UD) and joined another political party – Conservative People's Party. He was elected to the Sejm for the fourth time from Solidarity Electoral Action coalition list, becoming chairman of the parliamentary Interior Affairs Committee. In 2000 he was elected leader of the SKL.

When the Civic Platform was formed in January 2000, Rokita was reluctant to ally SKL with it, but a steady trickle of members to the new center right party forced him to.

In 2001, Rokita was elected to the Sejm for the fifth time, as a PO candidate. In 2002, he ran for office to be Mayor of Kraków, but without success.

In 2003, he was elected to Sejm's special investigative committee for the Lew Rywin affair. His participation in the committee has given him a tough inquisitor image and made him very popular, effectively resurrecting him as an active politician. In consequence, PO's opinion polls ratings skyrocketed.

When the negotiations for the future European constitution started in the end of 2003, he coined the slogan: "Nicea o muerte – Nicea albo śmierć" ((Treaty of) Nice or death), which was more or less the official position of the Polish delegation. He later softened his position on the constitution.

His first wife was Katarzyna Zimmerer, Polish-Jewish journalist. Now Rokita is married to his second wife Nelly Rokita, an ethnic German from Chelyabinsk, Russia. Nelly has a daughter from her first marriage.

In July 2007, he was sentenced to pay a fine for calling Grzegorz Wieczerzak "a very famous criminal".

In 2006, Jan Rokita became the coordinator of the so-called shadow office. In 2007, he gave up further political activity. On 14 September 2007, Rokita announced he would not be seeking re-election in the 2007 Polish elections. Officially, he claimed it was because of his wife Nelly's decision to enter Polish politics as an advisor to President Lech Kaczyński (affiliated with the right-wing Law and Justice Party). However, it was well documented that in the run up to the elections he and his supporters within the Civic Platform had become increasingly marginalised, and he claimed he could not communicate with section of Civic Platform in Kraków. Despite this, he did not leave Civic Platform and went on record that he would cast his vote for the party.

== Awards ==
- Kisel Prize (2003);
- "Man of the Year" according to the Wprost weekly (2003);
- Commander Cross the Order of the Renaissance of Poland (2008);
- The medal is "Invincible in the word" (11 December 2011).
- Cross of Freedom and Solidarity (2018);
