= Małgorzata Rohde =

Polish politician (born 1962)

Małgorzata Rohde (born 7 October 1962 in Drawsko Pomorskie) is a Polish politician and former Member of the Sejm for Koszalin (19 October 2001 to 18 October 2005). She is a member of the Conservative People's Party.
