= Kazimierz Żygulski =

Polish sociologist (1919–2012)

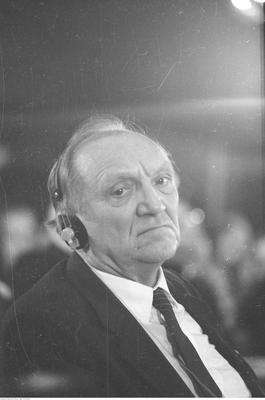
- Portait of Żygulski, 1986. From the National Digital Archives

Minister of Culture and Art
- In office October 9, 1982 – September 29, 1986
- Prime Minister: Wojciech Jaruzelski, Zbigniew Messner
- Preceded by: Joseph Tejchma
- Succeeded by: Alexander Kravchuk

Personal details
- Born: 8 December 1919 Tustanowice,^{α} Lwów Voivodeship, Second Polish Republic
- Died: 23 February 2012 (aged 92) Warsaw, Masovian Voivodeship, Third Polish Republic

Kazimierz Żygulski (1919 – 23 February 2012) was a Polish sociologist, political activist and Minister of Culture.

== Biography ==
In 1937, he graduated from high school humanities in Lwów, and then he studied at the Faculty of Law of the University of Jan Kazimierz, where he graduated during the first Soviet occupation of Lviv in 1941. He belonged to the youth organizations of the Democratic Club and the Democratic Party.

During the German occupation of Lemburg, he was a member of the Government Delegation for Poland, as well as a judge of the Special Court. In 1944, he was arrested by the NKVD and sentenced for his participation in the work of the Delegation for 15 years in a labour camp. He was sent to a camp in the Komi Republic in the north of the USSR where he lived for ten years, until 1955.

In 1956, he returned to Poland. From 1957, he worked at the Polish Academy of Sciences, and then as part of the Institute of Philosophy and Sociology (1959-1990). In 1973, he became an associate professor, and then a full professor in 1983.

From 1982-1986, he was Minister of Culture and Art, and in the period 1987-1989, chairman of the Polish Committee for UNESCO and a member of the Executive Board of UNESCO in Paris. In 1983, he was elected to the Presidium of the National Council of the Society of Polish-Soviet Friendship. In August 1984, he joined the Civic Committee of the Celebrations of the 40th anniversary of the Warsaw Uprising. From 1986-1989, he was a member of the National Committee of Grunwald.

He was president and professor School of Social and Economics in Warsaw from 1996 until his death.

== Papers ==
He wrote a number of papers on the theory and the sociology of culture including:

- Introduction to cultural issues
- Values and cultural patterns
- Community laughter
- Festival and culture.

== Documentary ==
In September 2009, Edusat TV started broadcasting a 10-part documentary series entitled "Balance Generations", about the life of Kazimierz Żygulski, to celebrate his 90 years of life. This series is based on an interview with Kazimierz Żygulski, referring to the dramatic moments of his life.

== Notes ==
^α Today part of Boryslav, Ukraine.
