= Potocki Palace, Warsaw =

Coordinates: 52°14′33″N 21°00′50″E

Potocki Palace Pałac Potockich (in Polish)
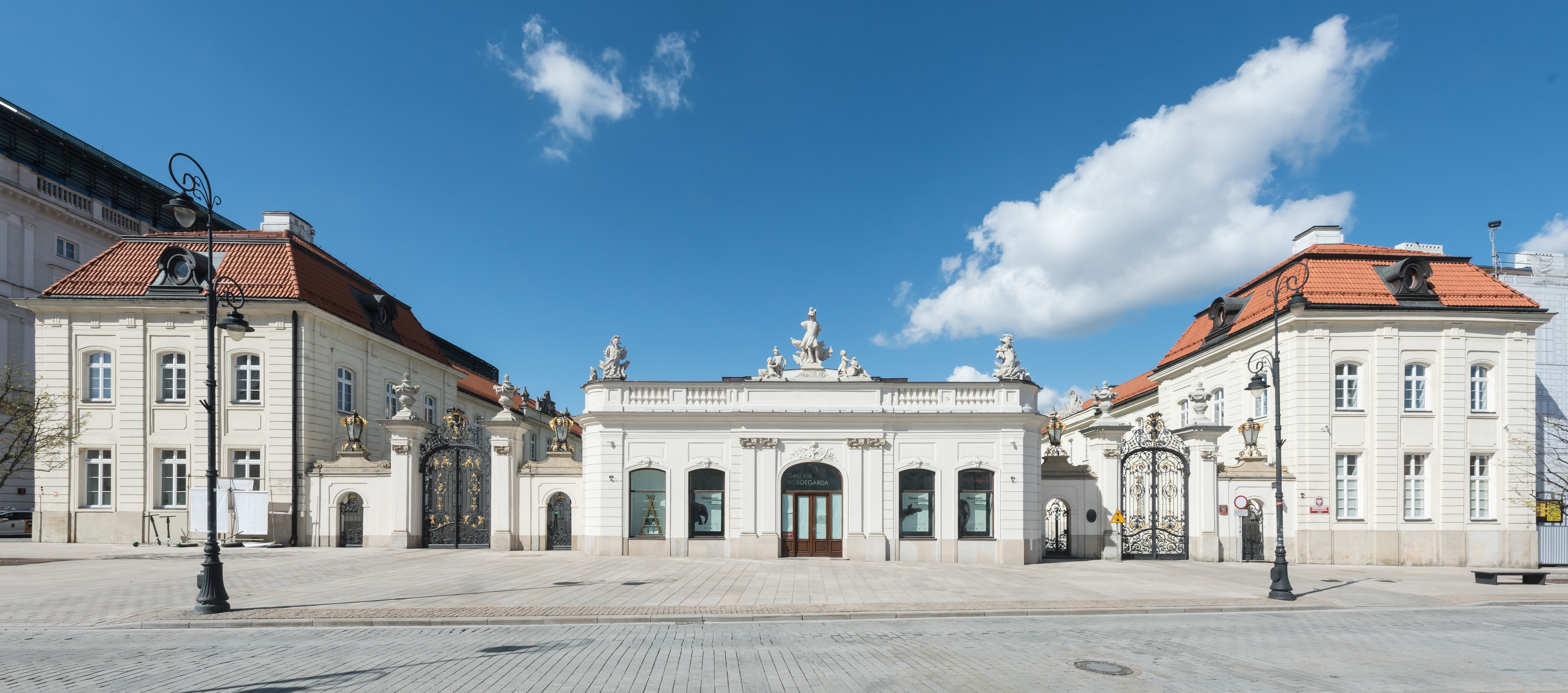
- Street façade.
- Interactive map of the Potocki Palace; Pałac Potockich (in Polish) area

General information
- Architectural style: Rococo and neoclassical (corps de logis)
- Location: Warsaw, Poland
- Construction started: 1693
- Completed: 1766
- Demolished: 1944

Design and construction
- Architect: Szymon Bogumił Zug (1790)

Historic Monument of Poland
- Designated: 1994-09-08
- Part of: Warsaw – historic city center with the Royal Route and Wilanów
- Reference no.: M.P. 1994 nr 50 poz. 423

The Potocki Palace (Polish: Pałac Potockich, Polish pronunciation: [pɔˈtɔt͡skʲi]) is a large baroque palace in Warsaw, located at Krakowskie Przedmieście 15, directly opposite the Presidential Palace. It was originally built for the Denhoff family and in the late 18th century became the property of the Potocki family.

After World War II the building served as the seat of the Ministry of Culture and Art (Ministerstwo Kultury i Sztuki). It now houses the Ministry of Culture and National Heritage (Ministerstwo Kultury i Dziedzictwa Narodowego).

== History ==
The original building at the site was burned down by Swedish and Brandenburgian forces during the "Swedish Deluge" of the 1650s. A new building was commissioned by Ernest Denhoff, and construction began in 1693 under architect Giovanni Pioli. From 1731 it was the property of August Aleksander Czartoryski.

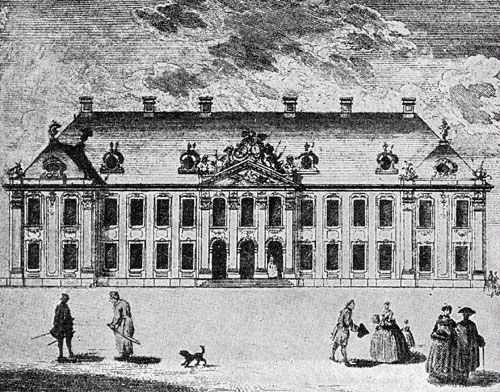
Potocki Palace in 1762

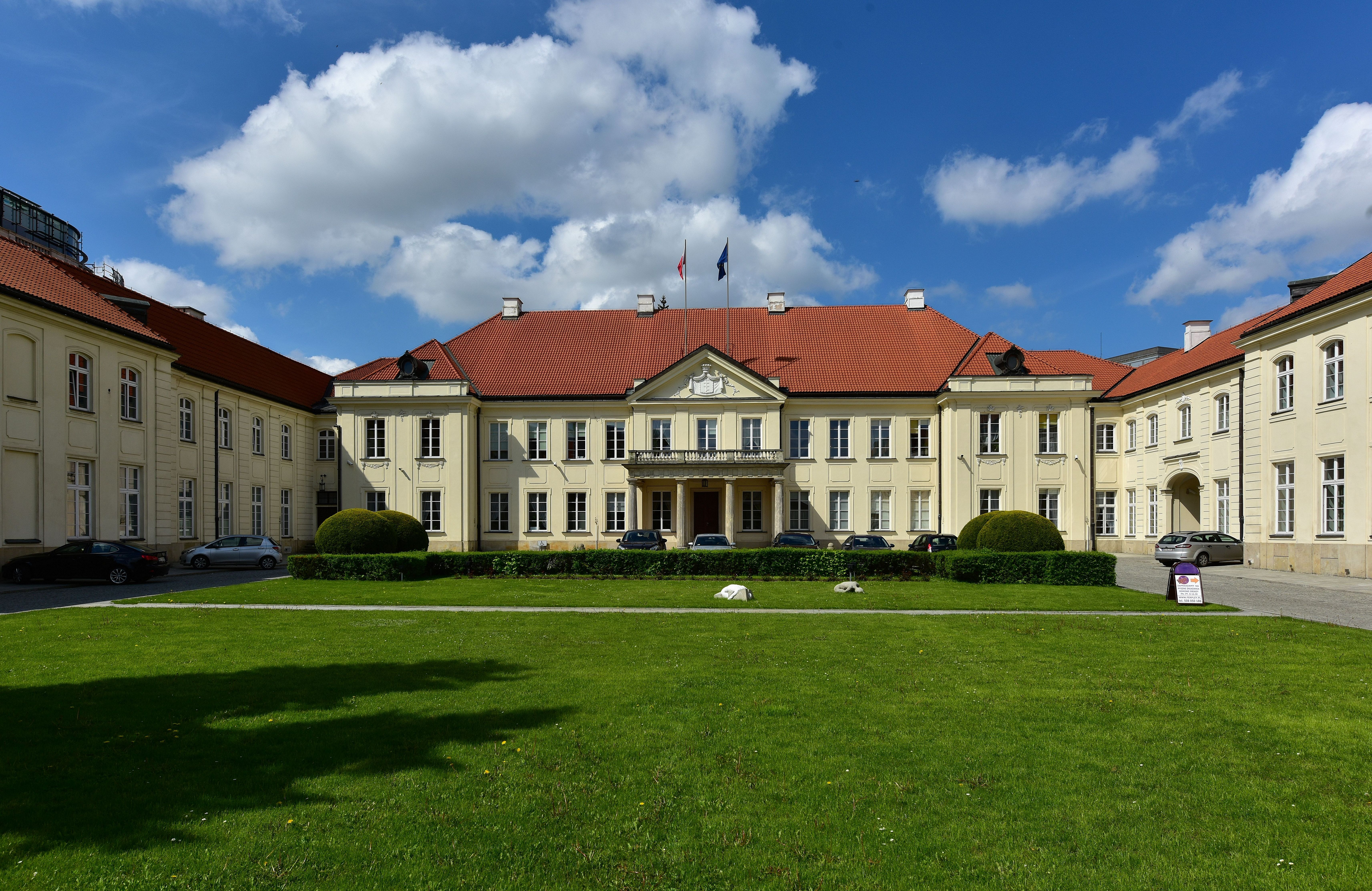
Inner courtyard

Under the Czartoryski family, the palace underwent several renovations. In 1760 the building façade was refashioned and new alcove outbuildings and two wings facing the street were added, finished with storeyed pavilions with mansard roofs based on plans by Jakub Fontana. Between them a guard-house was erected (1763) with sculptures by Sebastian Zeisl and two gates on each side. The layout is shaped like a horseshoe, with a central part and two side wings. The building was set back from the street by a courtyard, protected by a wrought-iron fence with a gate. The fence was designed in the neorococo style by Leandro Marconi.

Pałac Potockich was torn down in 1944 by the Germans after the collapse of the Warsaw Uprising. It was rebuilt after the war in 1948-1950 according to a design by Jan Zachwatowicz.

== See also ==
- Potocki Palace, Lviv
- Presidential Palace
