= Andrzej Siciński =

Polish pastor, lawyer and lecturer

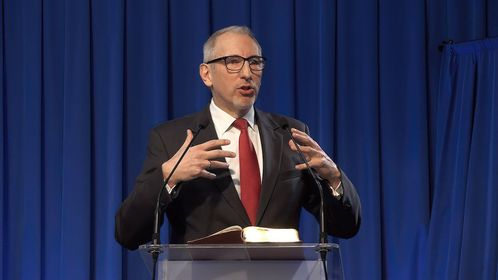
- Andrzej Siciński in Podkowa Leśna (2019)
- Born: 1962 (age 63–64); Łódź
- Religion: Adventism
- Church: Seventh-day Adventist Church

Andrzej Siciński (born 1962 in Łódź) is a Polish pastor of the Seventh-day Adventist Church, lawyer, editor-in-chief of the monthly Znaki Czasu, and lecturer at the Polish College of Theology and Humanities in Podkowa Leśna. During the 1980s, he was an anti-communist opposition activist. He is the author of numerous articles, some of which were published under the pseudonym Olgierd Danielewicz.

== Biography ==
Andrzej Siciński was born in 1962 in Łódź, into a Roman Catholic family. In 1981, prior to completing his high school education, he was one of the founders of the Independent Association of Secondary School Students in Łódź. That same year, he began studying law at the University of Łódź. As a student, he was active in the Independent Students' Association, distributed underground literature and press, and helped circulate Biuletyn Łódzki and Spotkania magazines. He participated in street demonstrations, distributed leaflets, and photographed anti-communist posters and slogans for documentation purposes.

In 1983, he married Małgorzata. They have two children, Olga and Daniel.

In February 1984, Siciński first encountered the Seventh-day Adventist Church congregation in Łódź, where he listened to lectures by Władysław Polok. On 12 September 1984, he was baptized into the faith.

== Activities in the Seventh-day Adventist Church ==
In 1987, Andrzej Siciński began working as the chief administrator of church properties.

He serves as the director of the church's Secretariat of Public Affairs and Religious Liberty. Between 1998 and 2003, he was a member of the Church Board, holding the position of secretary for the Seventh-day Adventist Church in Poland. Since 2003, he has been the editor-in-chief of the church's Znaki Czasu Publishing House and oversees two periodicals: the monthly Znaki Czasu and the bi-monthly Głos Adwentu.

As a lecturer in religious law at the Polish College of Theology and Humanities, he is a member of the Polish Society of Religious Law, which brings together representatives from nearly all academic centers in Poland specializing in religious law. He has also collaborated with the television channel Religia.tv.

== Ecumenical endeavors ==
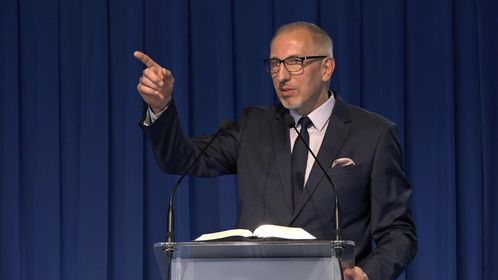
Andrzej Siciński in Podkowa Leśna (2020)

Andrzej Siciński participated in the ecumenical translation of the New Testament, serving as a consultant for the Seventh-day Adventist Church. He raised approximately 150 objections to the translation, over 50 of which were taken into account. However, since most of his objections were not incorporated, shortly after the publication of the ecumenical translation, he published a critique in Znaki Czasu, accusing the translation of Catholic confessionalization. The examples he provided typically highlighted discrepancies between Adventist doctrine and the teachings of other churches.

Siciński is also a signatory of the Declaration by the Council of the Polish Episcopal Conference for Ecumenism and the Leadership of the Seventh-day Adventist Church in Poland, marking the 15th anniversary of interdenominational dialogue. He noted that the declaration helped many Adventists and their families, who had faced discrimination as "sectarians" in their communities. It also facilitated the opening of cultural centers in small towns that had previously refused to rent their spaces to Adventists. The declaration demonstrated the Adventist Church's openness to dialogue, even with ideologically distant interlocutors. He mentioned that he became involved in this dialogue in 1998 after assuming the role of secretary of the church. He believes that if the declaration had been signed after the Vatican's Dominus Iesus document in 2000, it would not have been possible. Notably, the Catholic Church officially denied in the Declaration that Adventists were sectarian.

Siciński emphasizes the importance of finding common ground for peace and fostering a proper atmosphere in interactions with people holding different views. However, he is cautious about ecumenism, although he does not rule out cooperation on certain matters and recognizes the value of such collaboration.

== Stance on lustration ==
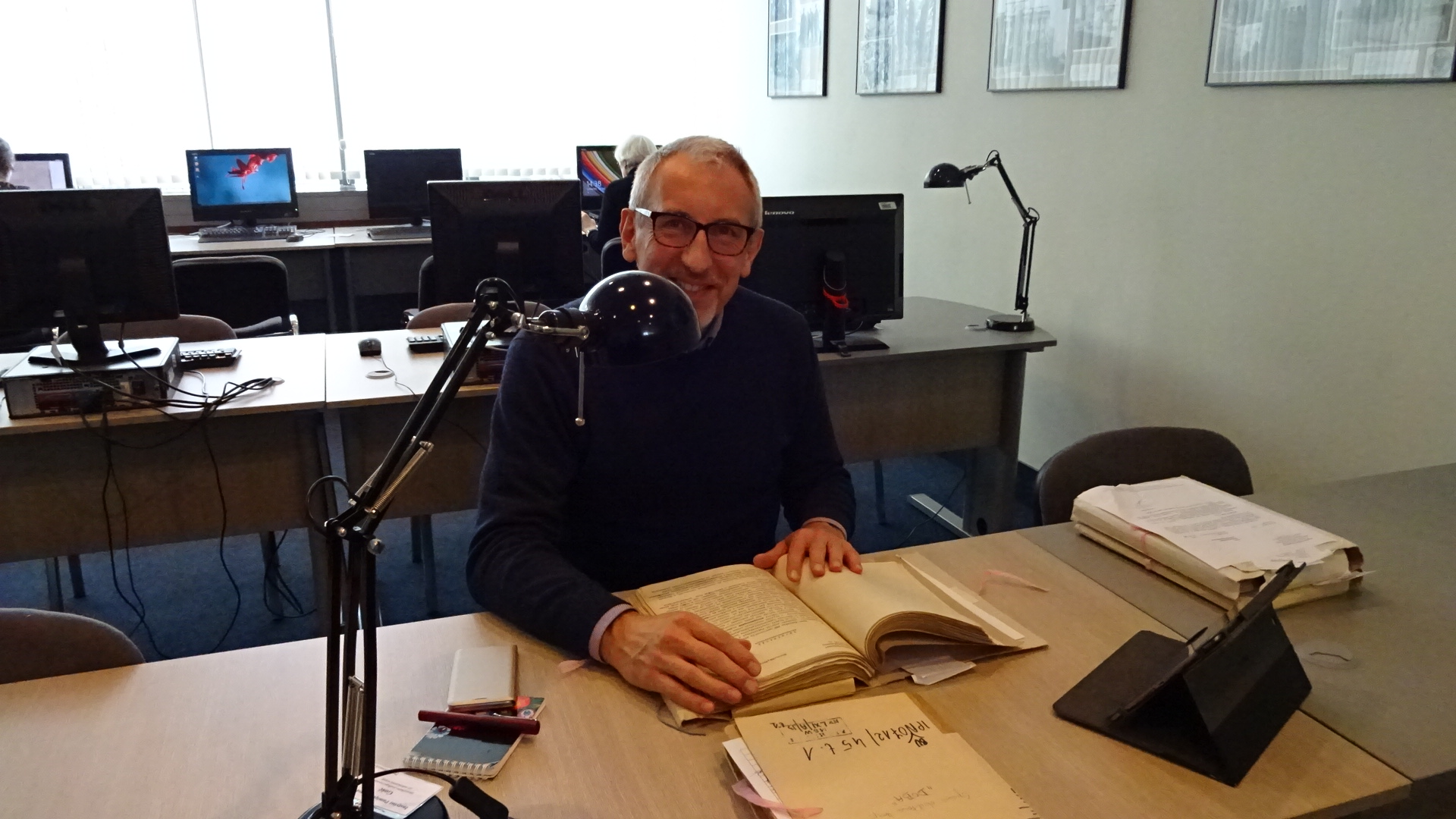
Andrzej Siciński in the Institute of National Remembrance's reading room at Krasiński Square (2017)

After the publication of the Wildstein list, there was a discussion within the Polish Seventh-day Adventist Church regarding the need for lustration. Andrzej Siciński pointed out that lustration based on files would not be fair, as the files of the "sharks of denunciation" had long been destroyed, leaving only those of the "small fish". He also questioned the reliability of these files. Siciński assessed that those conducting the lustration were closer to Old Testament ethics than to Christ's command to love one's enemies.

== Issue of religious freedom ==
In his columns, he often raises the issue of religious freedom and criticizes politicians for statements that ignore this freedom. In the article Faces of (In)tolerance, he advocated for officials and journalists to start recognizing the problems of religious minorities, rather than seeing them as a problem.

In the context of the dispute over the cross placed in front of the Presidential Palace after the Smolensk air disaster, he addressed the widespread practice of Catholics placing crosses in public spaces and hanging them in schools and government buildings, including in the parliament.

He criticized Bronisław Komorowski for his statement to the Pope in which he claimed that Poland belongs to the Catholic Church. He also criticized President Komorowski's minister, Prof. Krzysztof Szczerski, for his proposal to turn Poland into a confessional republic.

In 2016, in the context of the influx of refugees from Muslim countries to Europe, he questioned what the outcome would be for European standards of religious freedom if their respect for the religious rights of refugees leads to many newcomers refusing to adhere to European laws and standards in this area.

He criticized Jarosław Kaczyński for his statement that outside of the church there is only nihilism, for identifying Polishness exclusively with Catholicism, and treating non-Catholics as second-class citizens. He also criticized Zbigniew Ziobro for his efforts to remove the Reformed Catholic Church from the Register of Churches and Religious Associations.

== Awards ==
In 2005, he was awarded the Silver Cross of Merit for his charitable work.

On 14 June 2019, he received the Cross of Freedom and Solidarity for his anti-communist activities in the first half of the 1980s. The award was presented on behalf of President Andrzej Duda by the President of the Institute of National Remembrance, Jarosław Szarek.
