= Right Alliance (Poland) =

Conservative political party in Poland

The Right Alliance (Polish: Przymierze Prawicy) was a conservative political party in Poland from 2001 to 2002.

The party was formed on 26 March 2001 from part of the Solidarity Electoral Action political coalition. It formed an electoral alliance with the Law and Justice party in the September 2001 election to the Sejm of the Republic of Poland. It completed its merger into Law and Justice on 2 June 2002.

== Notable politicians ==
- Michał Kamiński
- Piotr Krzywicki
- Kazimierz Marcinkiewicz
- Krzysztof Mikuła
- Jerzy Polaczek
- Paweł Przychodzeń
- Grzegorz Schreiber
- Wojciech Starzyński
- Mirosław Styczeń
- Maciej Wąsik

== See also ==
- Law and Justice
- Kazimierz Ujazdowski
