= Michał Kamiński =

Polish politician (born 1972)

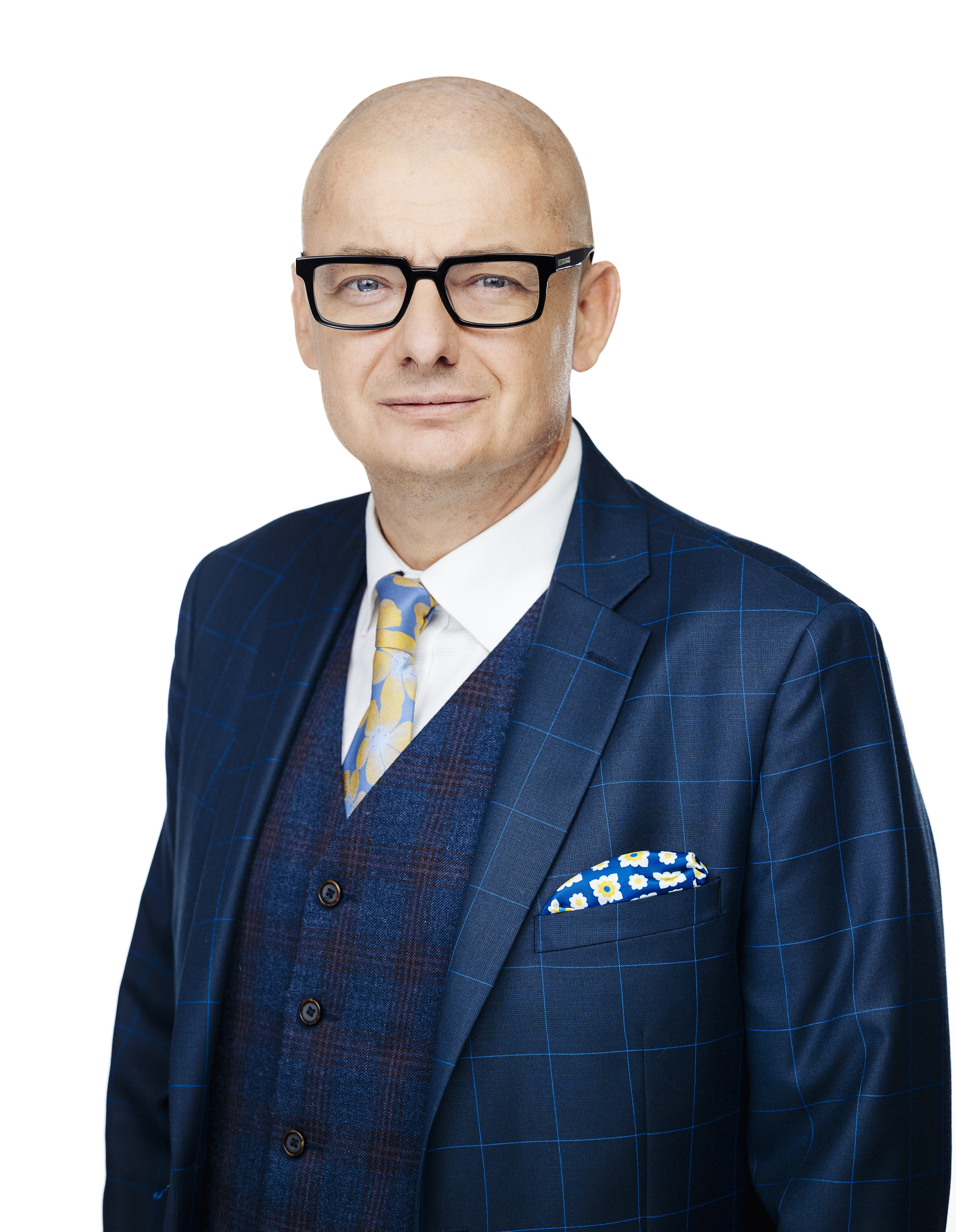

Deputy Marshal of the Senate
- Incumbent
- Assumed office 12 November 2019 Serving with See List
- Marshal: Tomasz Grodzki; Małgorzata Kidawa-Błońska

Chairman of the European Conservatives and Reformists
- In office 14 July 2009 – 8 March 2011
- Vice-Chair: Timothy Kirkhope
- Preceded by: Timothy Kirkhope (Acting)
- Succeeded by: Jan Zahradil

Member of the European Parliament
- In office 14 July 2009 – 26 May 2014
- Constituency: Warsaw
- In office 20 July 2004 – 6 August 2007
- Constituency: Warsaw

Member of the Sejm
- In office 20 October 1997 – 16 June 2004
- In office 12 November 2015 – 16 October 2019

Personal details
- Born: 28 March 1972 (age 54) Warsaw, Poland
- Party: Union of European Democrats (since 2016)
- Other political affiliations: Christian National Union (1989–2001); Right Alliance (2001–2002); Law and Justice (2002–2010); Poland Comes First (2010–2013); Civic Platform (2014–2016)
- Spouse: Anna Kamińska
- Children: 2
- Education: University of Warsaw
- Profession: Journalist
- Awards: Order for Merits to Lithuania
- Website: www.michalkaminski.pl

Michał Tomasz Kamiński (born 28 March 1972) is a Polish politician and a member of the Senate with the Union of European Democrats. He was chairman of the European Conservatives and Reformists in the European Parliament from July 2009 until March 2011.

Kamiński was a founder member of the Christian National Union (ZChN) in 1989, and served on its board from 1995 to 2001. Kamiński was elected to the Sejm in 1997 for Solidarity Electoral Action, which included ZChN. In 2001, he joined the Right Alliance (PP), which merged with Law and Justice (PiS) the following year, having been reelected on the PP-PiS joint ticket in 2001. He was elected to the European Parliament in 2004, representing Warsaw. He stepped down to become Secretary of State for Media Relations in Chancellery of the President. He was returned as an MEP in the 2009 election, and was elected chairman of the new European Conservatives and Reformists group. In November 2010, he left PiS to form the more liberal Poland Comes First (PJN); while remaining in the ECR, he stepped down as chairman in March 2011.

== Biography ==
=== Early life ===
Kamiński attended XLIX Liceum Ogólnokształcące in Warsaw, and then studied International Relations and Diplomacy at the University of Warsaw. He first entered politics as a teenager, joining the National Revival of Poland (Polish: Narodowe Odrodzenie Polski) when he was 15. The present day NOP is considered to be anti-Semitic, though Kamiński has defended his membership of the organisation, arguing that it was a symbol of his opposition to communism and that the party was not anti-Semitic when he was a member. In 1989 he was one of the founding members of the Christian National Union, the youngest founder at 17 years of age. He was a radio and newspaper journalist and radio producer in Bydgoszcz and Łomża. He frequently published in Catholic journals and newspapers and before 1989 his work appeared in the underground press. During the 1995 Polish presidential election, he was press spokesman for Hanna Gronkiewicz-Waltz. Kamiński says he taught himself English by listening to illegal BBC World Service broadcasts.

=== Domestic career ===
He was elected to the Third Sejm on 21 September 1997 as part of the Solidarity Electoral Action (Akcja Wyborcza Solidarność) grouping of parties for the Łomża Voivodeship, and later Podlaskie Voivodeship.

In 1999, he visited London to present a gorget embossed with an image of the Virgin Mary to former Chilean dictator General Augusto Pinochet along with Marek Jurek and the journalist Tomasz Wołek. "This was the most important meeting of my whole life. Gen Pinochet was clearly moved and extremely happy with our visit," Kamiński told the BBC's Polish service. In the same year, Kamiński won a journalists' award for being the best speaker in the Sejm. However, he later defended his visit to see General Pinochet, saying "we lived in this country subject to communist propaganda. We had little access to the real information, so for many Poles – not just me – this defence of Pinochet was across centre-right political parties in Poland and other eastern European countries at that time. It was my mistake, I admit it. I think every politician has the right to some mistakes. I made this mistake by just reversing the communist propaganda. It was a mistake that decent people of the left made when they were living under right-wing dictatorships – the kind of mistake where you just reverse the black and white propaganda. Today I know much more about Pinochet and I will never call him a hero again. It’s a question of context".

In July 2000, Kamiński used the word "pedał" (a derogatory Polish word for homosexual, usually translated into English as "fag" or "queer") in a TV interview to refer to gay rights campaigners. When asked by the reporter if such a term is offensive, his reply translates as: "That's how people speak, what should I say? They are fags." In a 2009 interview with Iain Dale he admitted the word was offensive and that he would never use it again. He confirmed he has homosexual friends and stated that he respects "the right [of gay people] to be treated with civility". In the same interview he expressed his pride that Poland was one of the first countries in Europe to decriminalize homosexuality and said that he has nothing against civil partnership legislation and "would consider voting yes" if he was still a member of the Polish Parliament. Also in 2000, he visited his first Conservative Party Conference, with Czech MEP Jan Zahradil.

He became a member of the Right Alliance (Przymierze Prawicy) in 2001, and then joined the new conservative party Law and Justice (Prawo i Sprawiedliwość) in 2002. Kamiński was re-elected to the Sejm, for its Fourth Term, on 23 September 2001, representing the constituency of Białystok. Law and Justice increased its Parliamentary number from 18 to 45.

He was a member of the Committee on Agriculture and Rural Development and the Committee on Foreign Affairs.

In 2001 he was alleged by the Anti-Defamation League of organising to prevent a commemoration of the World War II murder of Polish Jews by Polish gentiles in the town of Jedwabne. He has been quoted as saying that no apology should be forthcoming to the Jews of Jedwabne – until Jews had themselves apologised for their part in Soviet atrocities during the Soviet occupation, an idea not uncommon in parts of central and eastern Europe which had been part of the Soviet empire. He said "My position is that there were acts of collaboration of the Jewish people with the Soviet army when the Soviet army came to Poland. It’s a fact. It’s a historical fact… If you are asking the Polish nation to apologise for the crime made in Jedwabne, you would require from the whole Jewish nation to apologise for what some Jewish Communists did in Eastern Poland".

Then-Polish President Aleksander Kwaśniewski issued an apology for the atrocity, but the issue was hugely divisive, especially as dozens of witness statements made by Jews after the war stated it was the Germans that committed the atrocity and Hermann Schaper was convicted on sample counts of crimes against humanity immediately before and after the Jedwabne atrocity; moreover spent German ammunition was found at the crime scene, underneath a statue of Lenin known to have been buried on July 10, 1941. As the deputy in the Sejm responsible for the area, Kamiński expressed his opposition to a generalised apology, arguing that the individuals responsible should instead be singled out as criminals. In an interview with Martin Bright, political editor of the UK's Jewish Chronicle in 2009, he said "From the very beginning I was saying as a human being, as a Pole, that Jedwabne was a terrible crime, unfortunately committed by the Polish people. My point was from the very start: we are ashamed of these people, we have to condemn them, we have to judge them if they are still alive. But I don’t want to take the whole responsibility for this crime for the whole Polish nation".

In an interview with political blogger Iain Dale, he said "if there were any doubts about my past I will give you the ultimate argument. When I became Secretary of State of Poland, I received a top NATO clearance, so it’s not about Polish politics now – it’s about a NATO clearance. I don’t think there can be any doubts about my political views and my past if I can receive a top NATO clearance."

Stephen Pollard has said "As Editor of the Jewish Chronicle, and founding chairman of the European Institute for the Study of Contemporary Antisemitism, I am more alive than most to the dangers of the newly resurgent antisemitism. But there is simply no evidence that Mr Kaminski is an antisemite, only a series of politically motivated assertions. It is not Kaminski who is odious; it is those using antisemitism as a tool for their own political ends who deserve contempt".

=== European career ===
Kamiński was first elected to the European Parliament on 16 June 2004. During his first term in the Parliament, he was a Vice-Chairman of the (now defunct) Union for a Europe of Nations group and sat on the European Parliament's Committee on the Internal Market and Consumer Protection. He was a substitute for the Committee on Foreign Affairs, a vice-chair of the Delegation to the ACP-EU Joint Parliamentary Assembly and a substitute for the Delegation for relations with the countries of Central America. He was one of the most active Polish MEPs, and wrote a report examining possible Ukrainian membership of the EU. Kamiński is considered a key ally of President Lech Kaczyński, as well as being a modernising, moderating influence on Law and Justice in contrast to other Law and Justice politicians such as leader Jarosław Kaczyński. The BBC described him as "a 'spin doctor' – media-savvy, smartly dressed with fashionable spectacles, one of the masterminds of conservative President Lech Kaczynski's successful election campaign in 2005". On 13 July 2007 Kamiński was appointed Secretary of State in the Office of the President of the Republic of Poland, responsible for media policy. He vacated his European Parliament seat on 6 August, and was replaced by Ewa Tomaszewska. In his maiden speech, Kamiński demonstrated his admiration for Margaret Thatcher and Ronald Reagan:

As a Pole, I take particular pride in pointing out to the House that today’s celebrations would not be taking place were it not for the spiritual inspiration of our great fellow countryman, His Holiness John Paul II. He inspired Solidarity, the powerful social movement that led to the fall of Communism. President Lech Wałęsa, the leader of this movement became a symbol of the struggle for democracy and human rights for the world. He is our guest today in this Chamber. I also want to recall with pride that the leaders of my party, Prawo i Sprawiedliwość (Law and Justice), as well as many of its members, were active participants in the movement for political independence that was Solidarity. At this time I would also like to express gratitude to two great leaders of the Western world whose steadfast attitude in the eighties helped break the fetters that bound the nations of Eastern and Central Europe. I would like to thank Prime Minister Margaret Thatcher and President Ronald Reagan.

He was re-elected as an MEP for Warsaw in 2009, now sitting in the new European Conservatives and Reformists Group (ECR). In the inaugural session of the 2009–2014 European Parliament session, he was the official ECR candidate for one the Vice-President of the European Parliament positions. However, he was not elected, largely due to the intervention of the British Conservative Edward McMillan-Scott who ran as an independent candidate from the ECR group. McMillan-Scott ran, as he was "unhappy with a lack of debate about Kamiński's candidacy and the controversial new alliance". Kamiński then became the first permanent chairman of the ECR group as a compromise measure, with Timothy Kirkhope stepping aside, in order for him to take up the position. He is the first person from Central Europe to lead one of the political groups of the European Parliament. As chairman of the ECR, he is a member of the exclusive Conference of Presidents.

Due to their close links with the ECR, being founding partners, the British Conservative Party have been associated with Kamiński in his role as chair. Left-wing magazine The New Statesman reported that the US administration consequently had "concerns about Cameron among top members of the team", according to quotes from an unnamed Democratic Party source. The article further quoted David Rothkopf in saying that the issue "makes [Cameron] an even more dubious choice to be Britain's next prime minister than he was before and, should he attain that post, someone about whom the Obama administration ought to be very cautious." The Jewish Chronicle and the Guardian later also reported statements from an unnamed UK government official that US State Department officials had raised questions of the relationship in a meeting with the Home Office, a matter that US officials at the State Department denied, saying "No. It was not raised."

The British Conservative Party was also accused of attempting to alter pages on Wikipedia "to airbrush the embarrassing past" by Edward McMillan-Scott, who also stated that his own article had been edited in this way. An article published in The Observer newspaper reports edits to the articles made on 25 June 2009 from an IP address originating in the United Kingdom House of Commons.

On 27 January 2011, Kamiński announced that he would resign as chairman of the ECR, citing "aggression" and "hatred" from his former colleagues in Poland's Law and Justice party. His resignation took effect on 8 March, and he was replaced by Jan Zahradil.

=== Return to domestic politics ===
In 2019, he was elected to the Senate in the 2019 Polish parliamentary election representing the Polish People's Party. In November 2019, he was elected Deputy Marshal of Senate. In 2023, he was successfully re-elected to the Senate as a candidate of the Third Way political alliance.

== Political views ==
=== History ===
His views are described as "Euro-sceptic, free-market and Atlanticist" by Daniel Hannan MEP, who also described Kamiński as "the closest thing to a British Tory outside the Carlton Club."

Kamiński has spoken of his support for the Treaty of Lisbon which he believes "guarantees Poland's sovereignty". He has also spoken in favour of the Common Agricultural Policy. Nevertheless, in his debut speech in the European Parliament as ECR chairman he called on the EU political leaders to respect the Irish "no" vote to the Lisbon Treaty.

=== Holocaust ===
In February 2018, the Polish Prime Minister Mateusz Morawiecki stated that "there were Jewish perpetrators" of the Holocaust, "not only German perpetrators." Kamiński said he hopes Morawiecki "is being stupid and not ruthless." Prime Minister Morawiecki also paid respect to the Holy Cross Mountains Brigade, a right-wing Polish militia that, according to some historians, collaborated with Nazi Germany. Kamiński told The Jerusalem Post that the Holy Cross Mountains Brigade is "the only possible part of Polish resistance who actively collaborated with Germans...and he is visiting their graves and I cannot understand it."

In March 2019, the low-circulation right-wing weekly Tylko Polska ran a headline "How to spot a Jew" on its front page alongside a picture of Jan Gross. When he saw the newspaper being sold in the Sejm, Kamiński said that it was an "absolute scandal" that "filthy texts, as if taken from Nazi newspapers" were sold at the parliament.

In November 2024, following the Lithuanian parliamentary election, Kamiński criticized the decision of the Lithuanian Social Democratic Party to invite the nationalist Dawn of Nemunas party to join the ruling coalition. The founder of the latter party, Remigijus Žemaitaitis, is known for his antisemitic statements. In a Facebook post, Kamiński wrote that "in days when in Europe we again see pogroms, when Russia openly supports the enemies of Israel, there can be no place for antisemitism".

=== Poland-Ukraine relations ===
Kaminski is an ardent supporter of Ukraine's independence and integration with the European community and he strongly condemned the 2022 Russian invasion of Ukraine. However, in 2026, he made the decision to return his Ukrainian Order of Merit as a protest against awarding a Ukrainian military unit with the title of "Heroes of UPA" by President Volodymyr Zelenskyy. He stated that he made this decision considering that the actions of President Zelenskyy received full support of former Ukrainian presidents and the Ukrainian political elites. The Ukrainian Insurgent Army is remembered in Poland for its role in the Volhynia Massacres of 1943-45 while in Ukraine the formation is best remembered for its fight for independence against the Soviets.

== Personal life ==
In his private life, Kamiński's passions include books, foreign languages as well as football. He lives in the Warsaw neighbourhood of Wawer.

== Honours ==
- Order of Merit, 3rd Class (Ukraine, 2008, returned in 2026)
- Order of Infant Henry with Grand Ribbon (Portugal, 2008)
- Hungarian Order of Merit, Commander's Cross (Hungary, 2009)
- Order of Merit of the Republic of Lithuania (Lithuania, 2009)
- National Order of Merit, Honorary Officer (Malta, 2009)
- Presidential Order of Excellence (Georgia, 2010)

== See also ==
- 2009 European Parliament election in Poland

Party political offices
Preceded by Timothy Kirkhope	Chairman of the European Conservatives and Reformists; 14 July 2009 – 8 March 2011	Succeeded by Jan Zahradil
