= Jan Zahradil =

Czech politician (born 1963)

Jan Zahradil MEP
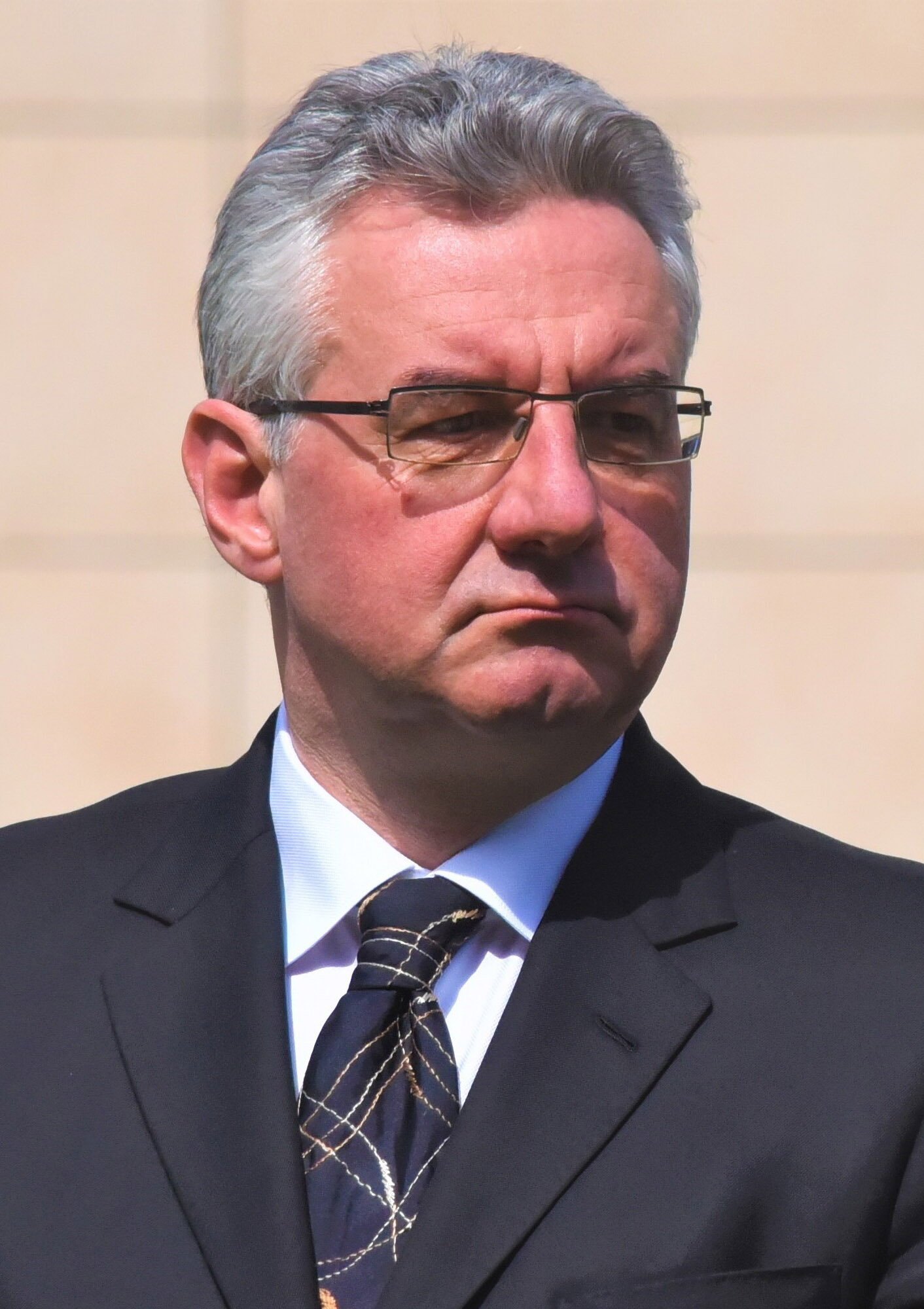
- Zahradil in 2019

President of the European Conservatives and Reformists Party
- In office 2010 – 1 April 2020
- Preceded by: Position established
- Succeeded by: Giorgia Meloni

Chairman of the European Conservatives and Reformists
- In office 8 March 2011 – 11 December 2011
- Vice-Chair: Timothy Kirkhope
- Preceded by: Michał Kamiński
- Succeeded by: Martin Callanan

Vice-Chair of the European Conservatives and Reformists Czech Delegation
- In office 11 December 2011 – 12 June 2014
- Chairman: Martin Callanan
- Served alongside: Ryszard Legutko; Derk Jan Eppink; Geoffrey Van Orden
- In office 24 June 2009 – 14 July 2009
- Chairman: Timothy Kirkhope
- Served alongside: Adam Bielan

Member of the European Parliament for the Czech Republic
- In office 1 May 2004 – 15 July 2024

Member of the Chamber of Deputies
- In office 20 June 1998 – 20 July 2004

Member of the Federal Assembly
- In office 6 June 1992 – 31 December 1992

Personal details
- Born: 20 March 1963 (age 63) Prague, Czechoslovakia
- Party: Civic Democratic Party (1991–2025)
- Education: University of Chemistry and Technology, Prague
- Profession: Scientist
- Website: http://zahradil.eu

Jan Zahradil (born 20 March 1963) is a Czech politician who served as a Member of the European Parliament (MEP) from 2004 to 2024, representing the Civic Democratic Party (ODS), and previously as a member of the Chamber of Deputies from 1998 to 2004. He left ODS in 2025.

A scientific researcher by profession, Zahradil entered politics during the Velvet Revolution. He was a member of the Federal Assembly of the Czech and Slovak Federative Republic, before becoming an adviser to Prime Minister Václav Klaus. In 1998, Zahradil was elected to the national Chamber of Deputies. Three years later, he became vice-chairman of ODS. From his election to the Chamber of Deputies until 2006, Zahradil was the ODS shadow minister for foreign affairs.

== Political career ==
=== Early political career ===
From 1990 until 1992, Zahradil was a Member of the Federal Assembly of the Czech and Slovak Federative Republic. From 1995 until 1997, he was a foreign policy adviser to Prime Minister Václav Klaus. In 1998, Zahradil was elected to the Chamber of Deputies, and held that position until 2004.

Zahradil was elected vice-chairman of ODS in 2001 and served as first vice-chairman between 2002 and 2004. In 2002, after the departure of Václav Klaus as leader of ODS, he ran for the leadership, but finished third in the election behind Mirek Topolánek and Petr Nečas. He was also vice-chairman of ODS from 2014 to 2016.

=== European Parliament ===
In October 2018, Zahradil announced his intention to become the European Conservatives and Reformists Group's candidate for the European Commission presidency. He was endorsed by the ECR Group on 13 November, making him the first Spitzenkandidat from Eastern Europe. Zahradil has been president of the Alliance of Conservatives and Reformists in Europe (ACRE) since it was founded in 2010.

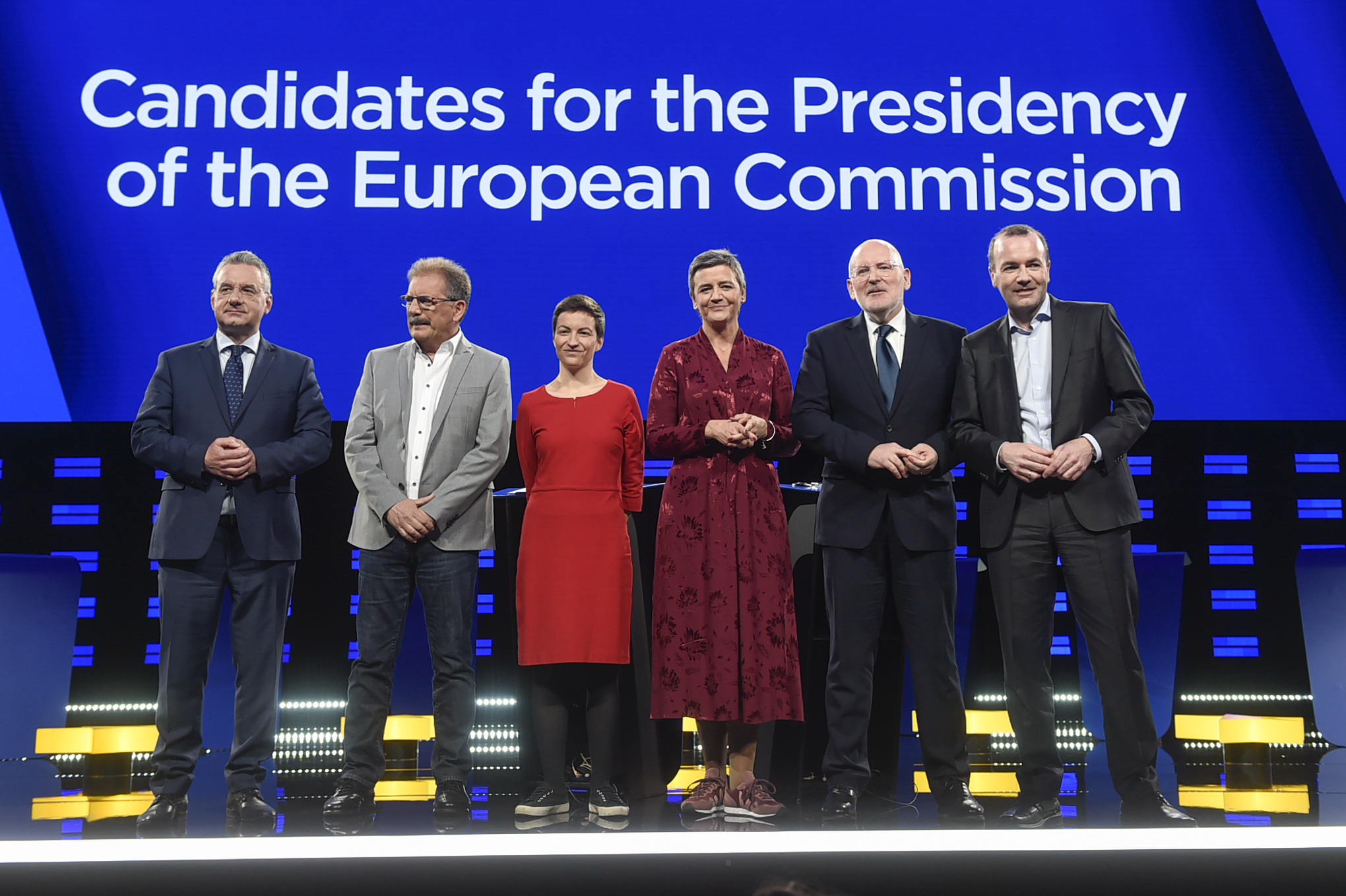
Jan Zahradil with the other candidates for President of the European Commission, 2019

In 2023, Zahradil resigned as chair of the ODS European parliament group. At the same time, he announced that he would not be a candidate in the European Parliament elections in 2024. He was replaced by MEP Veronika Vrecionová as chair of the ODS parliamentary group, and by Alexandr Vondra as the leader of the ODS candidate list for the European Parliament elections.

One of the reasons for Jan Zahradil's departure from European politics was reported to be the alliance of ODS with the Czech centre-right parties TOP 09 and KDU-ČSL in the Spolu coalition. Zahradil's Eurosceptic views were a potential obstacle to this alliance. He resigned his membership of ODS in 2025.

=== Azerbaijan Statements ===
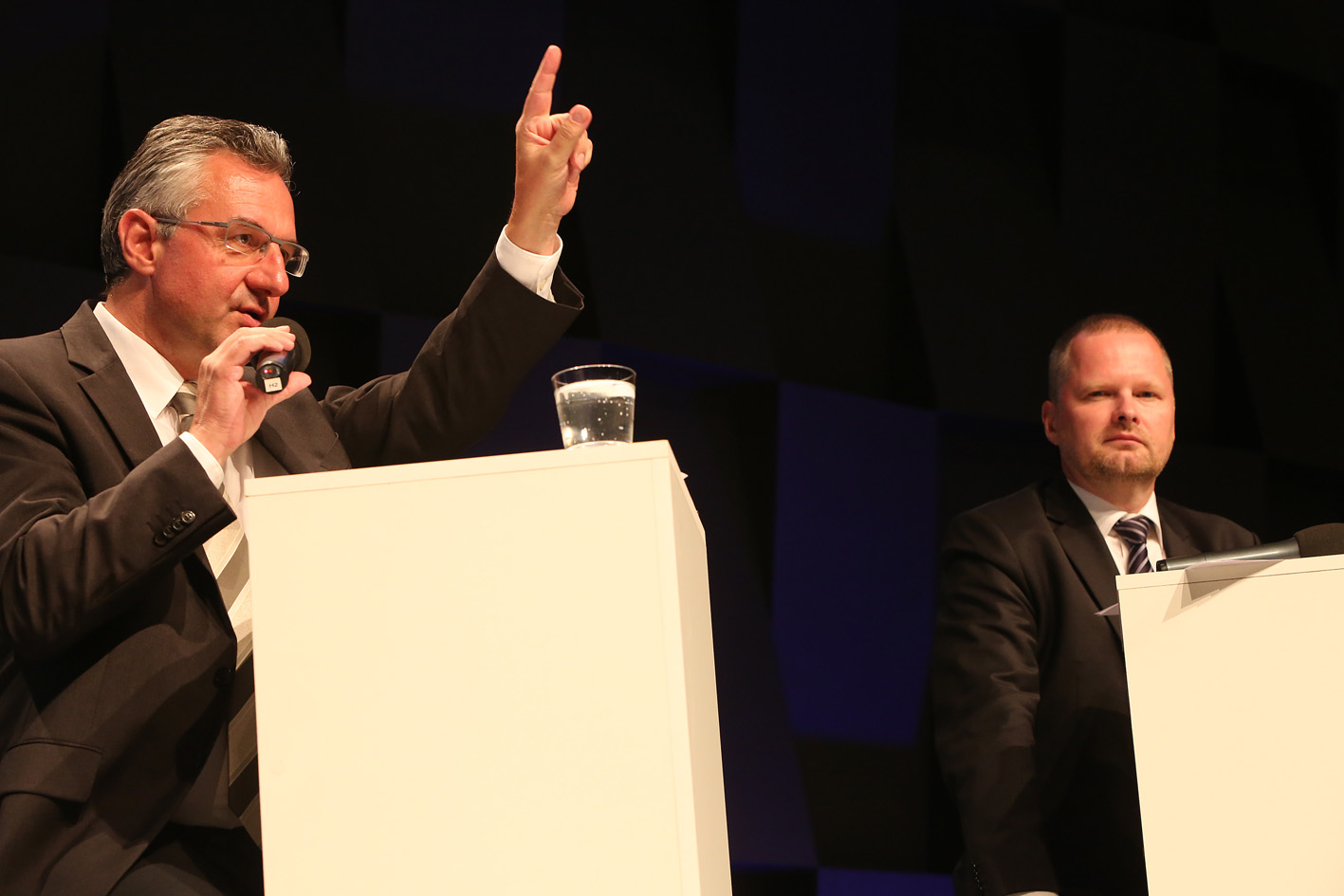
Jan Zahradil with the chairman of the ODS and later Prime Minister Petr Fiala

Zahradil made controversial statements whitewashing European Parliament's criticisms on the state of human rights in Azerbaijan, mentioned in three European Parliament resolutions in the period of 2015–2018. He called the resolutions "short-sighted, one-sided, one-issue resolutions" and argued that Azerbaijan is a "victim of political games" asserting that the EU should not sacrifice its partnership with Azerbaijan because of its geopolitical and energy significance for Europe.

In April 2018 a Parliamentary Assembly of Council of Europe investigation revealed that Azerbaijan blindfolded several members of PACE, bringing into play the infamous caviar diplomacy to tone down and soothe criticism towards Azerbaijan. These members were subjected to sanctions. Commenting on these events, Zahradil said: "The Council of Europe has made unilateral and biased decisions on Azerbaijan and it should be abolished".

== Political views ==
Zahradil has been described as Anglophile, Atlanticist, national liberal and libertarian who holds liberal viewpoints on immigration and same-sex marriage. He is a critic of the Czech monarchists and the Habsburg dynastic family, which ruled the Czech state from 1526 to 1918, because of which in the past he got into a dispute with the Czech Christian Democrats and the Czech Catholic Church. In the post-Babiš premiership era of ODS, his views (e.g. on the European Union, on cooperation with former Czech Prime Minister Andrej Babiš or on the overall concept of politics) can be described as minority, which may be one of the reasons for his planned departure from the European Parliament.

== See also ==
- Movement for European Reform
- European Conservatives and Reformists
- Alliance of European Conservatives and Reformists
