= Andrzej Zakrzewski =

Polish politician, historian and writer

Andrzej Jerzy Zakrzewski (22 August 1941, in Warsaw – 10 February 2000, in Warsaw) was a Polish lawyer, historian, politician, journalist, and publicist. He was a member of the Conservative People's Party (Stronnictwo Konserwatywno-Ludowe), the Solidarity Electoral Action (Akcja Wyborcza Solidarność) in the Sejm, and Minister of Culture and National Heritage of the Republic of Poland in cabinet of Jerzy Buzek (1999–2000).
