= Ministry of Communication (Poland) =

Former government ministry of Poland

Ministry of Communication (Polish: Ministerstwo Łączności) was a department dealing with telecommunications in Poland (telephones, post, telegraph). Liquidated in 2001, its competences were taken over by the Ministry of Infrastructure.

== Ministers of Communications ==
=== Department of Communications, Post and Telegraph ===
- from 23 July 1944 to 4 November: Jan Michał Grubecki (SL)
- from 4 November 1944 to 31 December 1944: Jan Rabanowski (SD)

=== Ministry of Communications ===
- from 11 March 1955 to 13 June 1956: Wacław Szymanowski (ZSL)
- from 13 June 1956 to 25 February 1958: Jan Rabanowski (SD)
- from 25 February 1958 to 27 June 1969: Zygmunt Moscow (SD)
- from 28 June 1969 to 2 April 1980: Edward Kowalczyk (SD)
- from 3 April 1980 to 12 June 1981: Zbigniew Rudnicki (SD)
- from 12 June 1981 to 23 October 1987: Władysław Majewski (SD)

=== Ministry of Transport, Navigation and Communications ===
- from 23 October 1987 to 1 August 1989: Janusz Kamiński (PZPR)
- from September 12, 1989, to December 20, 1989: Franciszek Wielądek (PZPR)

=== Ministry of Communications ===
- from 20 December 1989 to 14 September 1990: Marek Kucharski (SD)
- from 14 September 1990 to 5 December 1991: Jerzy Slezak (SD)
- from 23 December 1991 to 11 July 1992: Marek Rusin
- from 11 July 1992 to 26 October 1993: Krzysztof Kilian (KLD)
- from 26 October 1993 to 17 October 1997: Andrzej Zieliński (PSL)
- from 31 October 1997 to 26 March 1999: Marek Zdrojewski (AWS, since 1998 ZChN)
- from 26 March 1999 to 16 March 2000: Maciej Srebro (AWS, ZChN)
- from 16 March 2000 to 18 July 2001: Tomasz Szyszko (AWS, ZChN/Right Alliance)
- from 18 July 2001 to 24 July 2001: Janusz Steinhoff (acting, PPChD)
