= Aleksander Krawczuk =

Polish historian and academic (1922–2023)

- Born: June 7, 1922; Kraków
- Died: January 27, 2023 (aged 100); Kraków

Academic background
- Education: Jagiellonian University
- Thesis: Kolonizacja sullańska
- Doctoral advisor: Józef Wolski

Academic work
- Discipline: history
- Institutions: Jagiellonian University
- Main interests: classical antiquity

Aleksander Włodzimierz Krawczuk (born June 7, 1922, in Krakow, died January 27, 2023, in the same city) was a Polish historian of antiquity, essayist, academic teacher, professor of humanities, Minister of Culture and Art from 1986 to 1989, member of the Sejm (Polish parliament) during its first and second terms.

== Life ==
A graduate of Secondary School No. 4 in the Podgórze district of Krakow. During World War II, he was a soldier in the Home Army's “Żelbet” partisan group. In 1949, he graduated in history and classical philology from the Faculty of Philosophy and History at the Jagiellonian University and took up a research position at the Department of Ancient History at the Jagiellonian University as an assistant to Ludwik Piotrowicz. In addition, from 1957 until he took up the post of minister in 1986, he worked at the Higher School of Pedagogy in Krakow; he also lectured at the Higher School of Pedagogy in Rzeszów. In 1960, he obtained his doctorate on the basis of his dissertation Kolonizacja sullańska (The Colonization of Sulla) (written under the supervision of Józef Wolski). He obtained his habilitation in 1963 on the basis of his work entitled Virtutis ergo. Nadania obywatelstwa rzymskiego przez wodzów Republiki (The Granting of Roman Citizenship by the Leaders of the Republic). From 1980 to 1986, he headed the Department of Ancient History at the Jagiellonian University. In 1985, he received a professorship in the humanities.

He studied ancient history and popularized topics related to antiquity. He co-hosted the television documentary series Antyczny świat profesora Krawczuka (Professor Krawczuk's Ancient World). He published numerous scientific works and popular science books, which were translated into several languages. He was a member of the Polish Writers' Union (1971–2003) and served as president of its Krakow branch from 1986 to 1987. He was also president of the Krakow branch of the Polish Culture Foundation and a member of the Polish Authors' Association.

From 1986 to 1989, he was a member of the National Grunwald Committee. During the same period, he served as Ministry of Culture and National Heritage in the governments of Zbigniew Messner and Mieczysław Rakowski. From 1991 to 1997, he was a member of the Sejm (Polish Parliament) for the first and second terms on behalf of the Democratic Left Alliance. In later years, he was counted among the supporters of the Przyjazny Kraków (Friendly Krakow) association associated with Jacek Majchrowski.

On the occasion of his 100th birthday in June 2022, the Historical Museum of the City of Krakow organized an exhibition entitled “Aleksander Krawczuk, One Hundred Years...” at the Krzysztofory Palace.

Krawczuk died on 27 January 2023, at the age of 100. He was buried in Rakowicki Cemetery.

== Personal life ==
Son of Dymitr and Maria. He was the father of historian Wojciech Krawczuk.

== Awards and distinctions ==
- Grand Cross of the Order of Polonia Restituta (1997, awarded by President of Poland Aleksander Kwaśniewski in recognition of outstanding contributions to national culture)
- Gold Medal for Merit to Culture – Gloria Artis (2009)
- City of Kraków Award(1972)
- Kowadło Kuźnicy (2013)

== Publications ==
- Kolonizacja sullańska, Ossolineum, Wrocław 1960
- Gajusz Juliusz Cezar, Ossolineum, Wrocław 1962
- Cesarz August, Ossolineum, Wrocław 1964
- Neron, Czytelnik, Warszawa 1965
- Herod, król Judei, Wiedza Powszechna, Warszawa 1965
- Perykles i Aspazja, Ossolineum, Wrocław 1967
- Siedmiu przeciw Tebom, PIW, Warszawa 1968
- Sprawa Alkibiadesa, Czytelnik, Warszawa 1968
- Kleopatra, Ossolineum, Wrocław 1969
- Wojna trojańska: Mit i historia, Wiedza Powszechna, Warszawa 1969
- Konstantyn Wielki, Wiedza Powszechna, Warszawa 1970
- Pan i jego filozof. Rzecz o Platonie, PIW, Warszawa 1970
- Ród Konstantyna, Wiedza Powszechna, Warszawa 1972
- Sennik Artemidora, Ossolineum, Wrocław 1972
- Tytus i Berenika, Czytelnik, Warszawa 1972
- Julian Apostata, Wiedza Powszechna, Warszawa 1974
- Rzym i Jerozolima, Czytelnik, Warszawa 1974
- Mity, mędrcy, polityka, PIW, Warszawa 1975
- Maraton, Wiedza Powszechna, Warszawa 1976
- Ostatnia olimpiada, Ossolineum, Wrocław 1976
- Upadek Rzymu. Księga wojen, Ossolineum, Wrocław 1978
- Starożytność odległa i bliska, "Pax”, Warszawa 1980
- Mitologia starożytnej Italii, Wydawnictwa Artystyczne i Filmowe, Warszawa 1982
- Ród Argeadów, Wyd. Literackie, Kraków 1982
- Stąd do starożytności, Wydawnictwa Radia i Telewizji, Warszawa 1985
- Poczet cesarzy rzymskich, Iskry, Warszawa 1986
- Opowieści o zmarłych. Cmentarz Rakowicki, KAW, Kraków 1987
- Groby Cheronei, Wyd. Poznańskie, Poznań 1988
- Alfabet Krawczuka mitologiczny, "Cracovia”, Kraków 1991
- Rzymianki, Polczek, Kraków 1992
- Poczet cesarzy bizantyjskich, Iskry, Warszawa 1992
- Kronika starożytnego Rzymu, Iskry, Warszawa 1994
- Kronika Rzymu i Cesarstwa Rzymskiego, Iskry, Warszawa 1997
- Poczet cesarzowych Rzymu, Iskry, Warszawa 1998
- Rzym, Kościół, cesarze, Iskry, Warszawa 2000
- Polska za Nerona, Iskry, Warszawa 2002
- Spotkania z Petroniuszem, Iskry, Warszawa 2005
