= Polish Liberal Programme =

The Polish Liberal Programme (Polish: Polski Program Liberalny, PPL) was a parliamentary group active in the Sejm and Senate of Poland from 6 November 1992 to 31 May 1993. It was a part of the coalition supporting the cabinet of Hanna Suchocka.

== History ==
The Polish Liberal Programme was formed on 6 November 1992, as a parliamentary group combining members of the Sejm from the Liberal Democratic Congress, Polish Beer-Lovers' Party (from the parliamentary group Polish Economic Programme), and 5 members Centre Agreement. In total, it counted 53 members of the Sejm, which diminished to 48 by the end of its existence. It also had 7 members from the Senate. The parliamentary group was led by Jan Pamuła. It was dissolved on 31 May 1993.
