= Piotr Łukasiewicz (sociologist) =

Polish sociologist and politician (born 1954)

Piotr Michał Łukasiewicz (born 1 September 1954 in Warsaw) is a Polish sociologist and politician who was head of the Ministry of Culture and Art.

== Biography ==
A graduate of the University of Warsaw, he obtained a doctoral degree with a specialization in the sociology of everyday life. In 1978–1994 he was a member of the editorial board of the independent political quarterly Krytyka.

Until 1992, he worked at the Institute of Philosophy and Sociology of the Polish Academy of Sciences. Later, for two years he was the undersecretary of state in the Ministry of Culture and Art. From July 1992 to February 1993, he was a minister in the government of Hanna Suchocka as the head of the Ministry of Culture and Art.

From 1994 to 2008, he worked in the advertising agency McCann-Erickson (including as a strategic director). Then he became an employee of Millward Brown SMG/KRC, taking the position of director.

In 2011, President Bronisław Komorowski awarded him the Knight's Cross of the Order of Polonia Restituta. In 2016, he was awarded the Cross of Freedom and Solidarity by President Andrzej Duda.
