= Timothy Kirkhope =

British Conservative politician and life peer

The Right Honourable The Lord Kirkhope of Harrogate
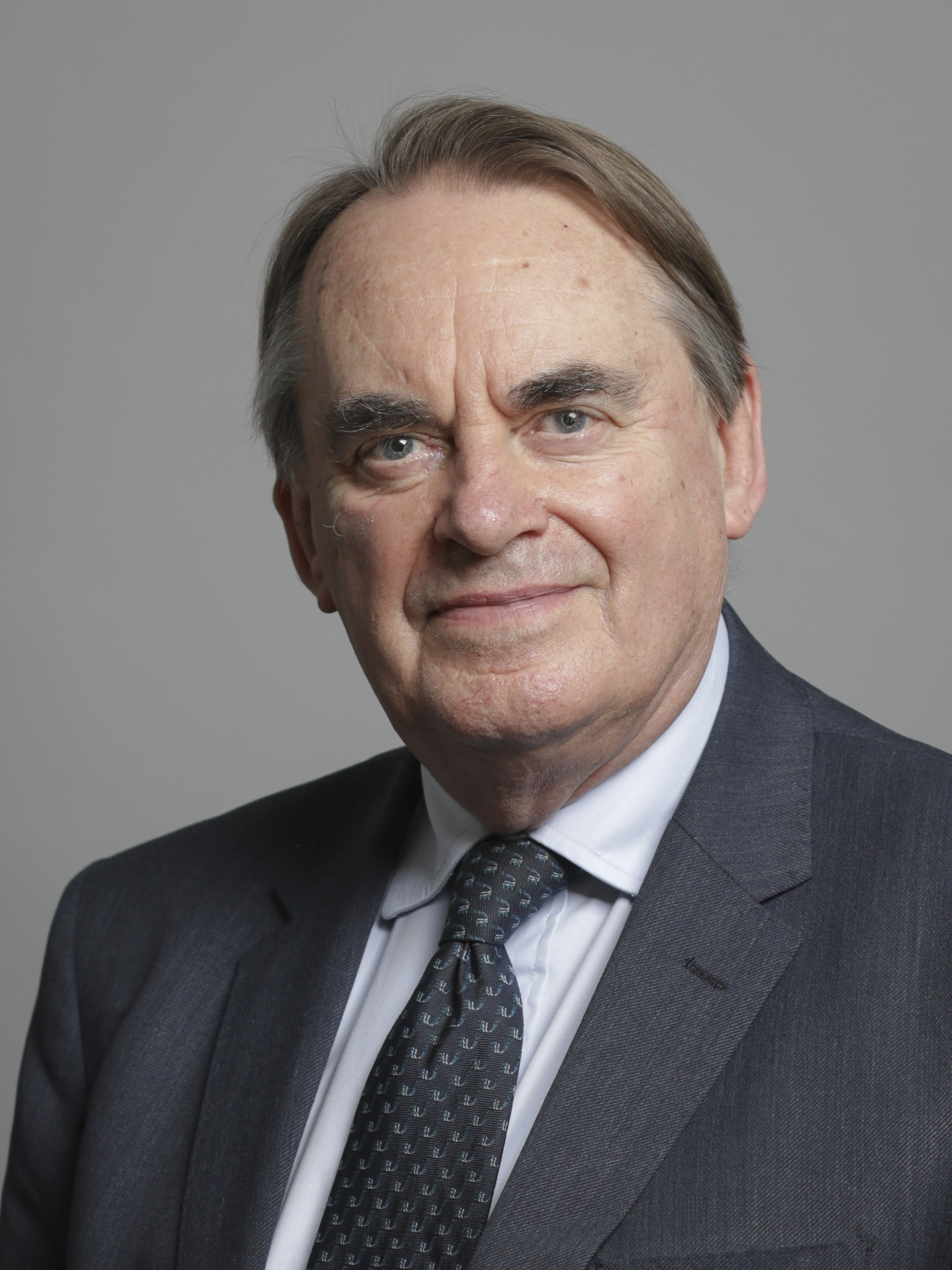
- Official portrait, 2019

Chairman of the European Conservatives and Reformists Acting
- In office 24 June 2009 – 14 July 2009
- Vice-Chairs: Adam Bielan; Jan Zahradil
- Succeeded by: Michał Kamiński

Vice-Chair of the European Conservatives and Reformists
- In office 14 July 2009 – 14 December 2011
- Chairman: Michał Kamiński; Jan Zahradil
- Succeeded by: Jan Zahradil; Geoffrey Van Orden; Ryszard Legutko; Derk Jan Eppink

Leader of the Conservatives in the European Parliament
- In office 18 November 2008 – 23 November 2010
- Preceded by: Philip Bushill-Matthews
- Succeeded by: Martin Callanan
- In office December 2004 – November 2007
- Preceded by: Jonathan Evans
- Succeeded by: Giles Chichester

Parliamentary Under-Secretary of State for Immigration and Border Controls
- In office 18 October 1995 – 2 May 1997
- Prime Minister: John Major
- Preceded by: Nicholas Baker
- Succeeded by: George Howarth

Vice-Chamberlain of the Household
- In office 7 July 1995 – 18 October 1995
- Prime Minister: John Major
- Preceded by: Sydney Chapman
- Succeeded by: Andrew MacKay

Lord Commissioner of the Treasury
- In office 11 December 1992 – 5 July 1995
- Prime Minister: John Major
- Preceded by: Tim Boswell
- Succeeded by: Simon Burns

Member of the House of Lords
- Lord Temporal
- Life peerage 1 September 2016

Member of the European Parliament for Yorkshire and the Humber
- In office 10 June 1999 – 1 September 2016
- Preceded by: Constituency established
- Succeeded by: John Proctor

Member of Parliament for Leeds North East
- In office 11 June 1987 – 8 April 1997
- Preceded by: Keith Joseph
- Succeeded by: Fabian Hamilton

Personal details
- Born: 29 April 1945 (age 81) Newcastle upon Tyne, Northumberland, England
- Party: Conservative
- Education: Royal Grammar School, Newcastle
- Profession: Solicitor
- Website: https://www.kirkhope.org.uk/

Video Introduction

Timothy John Robert Kirkhope, Baron Kirkhope of Harrogate (born 29 April 1945) is a British lawyer and politician who previously served as Member of the European Parliament (MEP) for Yorkshire and the Humber for the Conservative Party. After serving for ten years as Member of Parliament (MP) for Leeds North East, he was first elected to the European Parliament in 1999. Between December 2004 and November 2010 he was leader of the Conservative delegation for a total of six years. He was the chairman of the Conservative Friends of Israel's Europe grouping, the European Conservatives Spokesman on Justice and Home Affairs, and a member of the European Parliament's U.S Delegation. In 2016, he was created a life peer.

== Biography ==
Kirkhope was born in Newcastle upon Tyne, and educated at the independent Royal Grammar School, Newcastle and subsequently at the Law Society College of Law in Guildford before qualifying as a solicitor in 1973. He was a senior partner in Newcastle law firm Wilkinson Marshall Clayton and Gibson (now part of Eversheds) until election to Parliament in 1987. He still maintains a Solicitors Practising Certificate.

In 1982 he was elected to Northumberland County Council for one term and served as a director of Newcastle International Airport. He obtained his Private Pilot's Licence in 1983. He was very active in the Free Radio movement and a co-author of the Conservatives proposals for commercial radio in the late 1960s. He was then part of a consortium bidding for one of the first commercial radio licences when they became available. He has always had a strong interest in Hospital Broadcasting having been the chairman of Radio Tyneside for some years, and has maintained his links with that organisation. He was also very active in charitable work for the Macmillan Cancer Relief organization in Newcastle and the Family Service Unit movement.

== House of Commons ==
Kirkhope first stood for Parliament for Durham at the February 1974 General Election, but came second (with 27.07%) to the Labour incumbent Mark Hughes, although the voting swing in the constituency was surprisingly one of the biggest towards the Conservatives in the UK, at these "Miners" elections. In 1979 he contested Darlington, but was narrowly defeated by Labour's Ted Fletcher.

At the 1987 general election, Kirkhope followed Sir Keith Joseph as the Member of Parliament for Leeds North East. He was made Parliamentary private secretary to David Trippier at the Department of the Environment in 1989. In the same year, he introduced in his name, and saw passed, a Private member's bill (the Parking Act 1989) which was designed to help motorists use new methods like debit cards to pay for their parking needs. He became a Government Assistant Whip in 1990, then a Lord Commissioner to the Treasury in 1992, and Vice-Chamberlain of the Household in 1995 reporting on the business of the House of Commons directly to HM The Queen, whilst serving as whip.

In October 1995 Kirkhope received promotion to be Under-Secretary of State at the Home Office responsible for immigration, border controls, gambling and licensing policy, and horseracing, among other things.

He was defeated at the 1997 general election, his constituency attracting some interest because its majority had placed it at the point where a Labour gain would indicate that that party was likely to win an overall majority, which it did. Kirkhope then returned to legal practice and also went into business. He was a non-executive director of the Bournemouth and West Hants Water Company for some years, and then more recently has been, and remains, a member on the board of a company pension trust.

== European Parliament ==
In June 1999 he was elected to the European Parliament for Yorkshire and the Humber becoming the Conservative spokesman on justice and home affairs and the Chief Whip of the delegation that year. He also served on the Culture, Media, Arts Education and Youth Committee between 1999 and 2002. Then, in 2002, he became the Conservative Party representative on the Convention on the Future of Europe, established to consider the future course for Europe. In the course of that work he was one of those responsible for the proposal of what would become Article 50 of the Treaty of Lisbon in 2005. In 2002, he was re-selected by Conservative members in Yorkshire and The Humber to head the list of candidates in the European elections in June 2004.

In spring 2003, Kirkhope was asked by the then Shadow Home Secretary Oliver Letwin to look into the workings of the UK asylum system and to make proposals for future party policy. The Kirkhope Commission worked for several months and produced a comprehensive report with 20 specific recommendations.

In July 2004, Kirkhope was elected as the first Vice-Chairman of the EPP/European Democrats Parliamentary Group with which the UK Conservatives were in alliance at the time. After the success of his Asylum Commission, he was also asked to head another UK commission on immigration. The report that followed was presented to the then Shadow Home Secretary David Davis during the summer of 2004.

In December 2004, Kirkhope was elected Leader of the Conservative Delegation in the European Parliament. He was defeated in the Leadership election in November 2007 but was then re-elected in 2009. During his total of 6 years as the leader of the delegation Kirkhope sat on the Conservative Party Board in London.

In June 2009 Kirkhope helped to set up (with the Rt. Hon. William Hague), and then became the interim chairman of, a new European Parliament group the European Conservatives and Reformists (ECR) of which the UK Conservatives became founding members moving from their alliance with the EPP. He was then a candidate to become the permanent chairman of the bloc but he chose to step aside in favour of Polish MEP Michał Kamiński after Kamiński was denied one of the vice president of the European Parliament positions by then-Conservative Edward McMillan-Scott deciding to stand as an Independent without the support of his delegation or the new group. Kirkhope was appointed deputy chairman of the ECR Group by Kamiński in return for his gesture. He stood again for the presidency after Kamiński stepped down 2 years later but was controversially defeated by Martin Callanan. Further steps to assume a leading role in the group were rebuffed.

Kirkhope continued as Justice and Home Affairs spokesman with strong interests in the EP/USA delegation and was re-appointed to these roles following the 2014 European Elections where he again led the Party list in Yorkshire and the Humber.

== House of Lords ==
Following the referendum vote for Britain to leave the European Union 2016, David Cameron resigned as prime minister. His resignation honours list named Kirkhope as an nominee for a life peerage. In the afternoon of 1 September Kirkhope was created Baron Kirkhope of Harrogate, of Harrogate in the County of North Yorkshire. Peers are disqualified from sitting and voting in the House of Lords while serving as a Member of the European Parliament by virtue of sections 3 and 4 of the European Parliament (House of Lords Disqualification) Regulations 2008. And so Kirkhope relinquished his position as MEP.

Following his introduction in the House of Lords, he has subsequently become a Member of the Home Affairs Select Committee, Sub-Committee on EU Home Affairs, and is a member of the British American Parliamentary Group. He maintains his involvement with Classic Cars as an active member of the Parliamentary Historic Vehicles Group.

== Personal life ==
Kirkhope holds a pilot's licence, collects classic cars, swims and plays tennis. He is married and has four grown up sons. He lives near Harrogate in North Yorkshire.

Lord Kirkhope became a Liveryman of the Worshipful Company of Plumbers in 2020 and Freeman of the City of London in 2021.

Coat of arms of Baron Kirkhope of Harrogate
Notes The Grant of Arms granting this Arms to Timothy John Robert Baron Kirkhope was presented to Timothy Kirkhope from the Thomas Woodcock Garter King of Arms on 4 April 2017. Adopted 4 April 2017 Escutcheon Azure three Hawks close Ermine each grasping in the dexter claw a Rose Argent barbed seeded slipped and leaved Or and a Thistle proper slipped and leaved Or And for the Crest Upon a Helm with a Wreath Argent and Azure Upon a Mount Vert a triple-towered Castle proper thereon a Hawk wings expanded Ermine Manteled Azure doubled Argent. Motto Pertinax Perficio (Achievement through Tenacity)

Parliament of the United Kingdom
Preceded by Sir Keith Joseph	Member of Parliament for Leeds North East; 1987 – 1997	Succeeded by Fabian Hamilton
Political offices
Preceded by Sydney Chapman	Vice-Chamberlain of the Household; 1995	Succeeded by Andrew MacKay
Party political offices
Preceded by Jonathan Evans	Leader of the Conservative Party Delegation in the European Parliament; 2004 – 2007	Succeeded by Giles Chichester
Preceded by Philip Bushill-Matthews	Leader of the Conservative Party Delegation in the European Parliament; 2009 – 2010	Succeeded by Martin Callanan
New creation	Acting Chairman of the European Conservatives and Reformists; 24 June 2009 – 14 July 2009	Succeeded by Michał Kamiński
Orders of precedence in the United Kingdom
Preceded by The Lord McInnes of Kilwinning	Gentlemen; Baron Kirkhope of Harrogate	Followed by The Lord Caine
