= Andrzej Zieliński (politician) =

Polish politician (1934–2024)

Minister of Communication
- In office 26 October 1993 – 31 October 1997
- Preceded by: Krzysztof Kilian
- Succeeded by: Marek Zdrojewski

Personal details
- Born: 24 December 1934 Mokobody, Poland
- Died: 14 September 2024 (aged 89)
- Party: PSL
- Education: Warsaw University of Technology
- Occupation: Engineer

Andrzej Zieliński (24 December 1934 – 14 September 2024) was a Polish engineer and politician. A member of the Polish People's Party, he served as Minister of Communication from 1993 to 1997.

Zieliński died on 14 September 2024, at the age of 89.
