= Conservative People's Party (Poland) =

Conservative People's Party Stronnictwo Konserwatywno-Ludowe
- Leader: Jacek Janiszewski (first); Marek Zagórski (last)
- Founded: 12 January 1997
- Dissolved: 1 March 2014
- Split from: Solidarity Electoral Action
- Merged into: Poland Together
- Headquarters: ul. Reymonta 12a, 01-842, Warsaw
- Ideology: Christian democracy Liberal conservatism Agrarianism
- Colours: Navy Blue, White

The Conservative People's Party (Polish: Stronnictwo Konserwatywno-Ludowe, SKL) was a liberal-conservative and Christian-democratic political party in Poland, which was active in 1997–2003 and 2007–2014. In 2014, the party was incorporated into Poland Together.

== History ==
The party was formed in January 1997 with the merger of some minor Christian-democratic party and a conservative faction of the liberal Freedom Union, the latter led by Jan Rokita. The party soon joined the centre-right Solidarity Electoral Action coalition and was subsequently part of it in the 1997 parliamentary election. The coalition won 33.8% of the vote and 201 seats in the Sejm, 14 of which were SKL members, notably including Rokita and Bronislaw Komorowski.

Within the coalition, the SKL represented the more liberal wing. In the 2000 presidential election, Marian Krzaklewski was the coalition's official candidate and won 15.6% of the vote, but a large chunk of the coalition, especially SKL members, had supported the independent candidate Andrzej Olechowski, who won 17.3% of the vote.

In January 2001, when the Solidarity Electoral Action was re-organised as a federation, it was one of the four member parties, the other being the Social Movement, the Christian National Union and the Polish Christian Democratic Agreement. However, in March 2001, the SKL withdrew from the coalition and most of it would later join, indirectly or directly, Civic Platform, which had been established in January 2001. In the 2001 parliamentary election, the SKL participated within Civic Platform's electoral slates.

In 2002, what remained of the SKL was merged with the Polish Christian Democratic Agreement, while Rokita was Civic Platform's leader in the Sejm from 2003 to 2005. In 2004, the SKL and the Social Movement were replaced by the Centre Party. The Conservative People's Party was revived in 2007 and lasted until 2014, when it became part of Poland Together.

== Party presidents ==
- Jacek Janiszewski (1997–1998)
- Mirosław Styczeń (1998–2000)
- Jan Rokita (2000–2002)
- Artur Balazs (2002–2006, 2007–2009)
- Marek Zagórski (2009–2014)

== Latest Sejm members ==
In the 2001 parliamentary election, SKL politicians entered the Sejm as candidates of the Civic Platform Electoral Committee (Civic Platform + Conservative People's Party + Real Politics Union). Several SKL members including its leaders Jan Rokita and Bronislaw Komorowski decided to join directly the newly created Civice Platform, while those who refused to join it formed a separate parliamentary caucus:

- Dorota Arciszewska-Mielewczyk, Gdynia
- Artur Balazs, Szczecin
- Zbigniew Chrzanowski, Siedlce
- Ireneusz Niewiarowski, Konin
- Krzysztof Oksiuta, Warsaw
- Małgorzata Rohde, Koszalin
- Andrzej Wojtyła, Kalisz
- Marek Zagórski, Białystok

== Election results ==
=== Sejm ===
Election year	# of votes	% of vote	# of overall seats won	+/–
1997	4,427,373	33.83 (#1)	14 / 460	-
1997	As part of the Solidarity Electoral Action coalition, which won 201 seats in total.			

=== Senat ===
Election year	# of votes	% of vote	# of overall seats won	+/–
1997	6,550,176	25.25 (#1)	4 / 100	▲25
1997	As part of the Solidarity Electoral Action coalition, which won 51 seats in total.			

=== Presidential ===
Election year	Candidate	1st round	
Election year	Candidate	Votes	%
2000	Andrzej Olechowski	3,044,141	17.30 (#2)
