= Second inauguration of Donald Trump =

60th United States presidential inauguration

Second presidential inauguration of Donald Trump
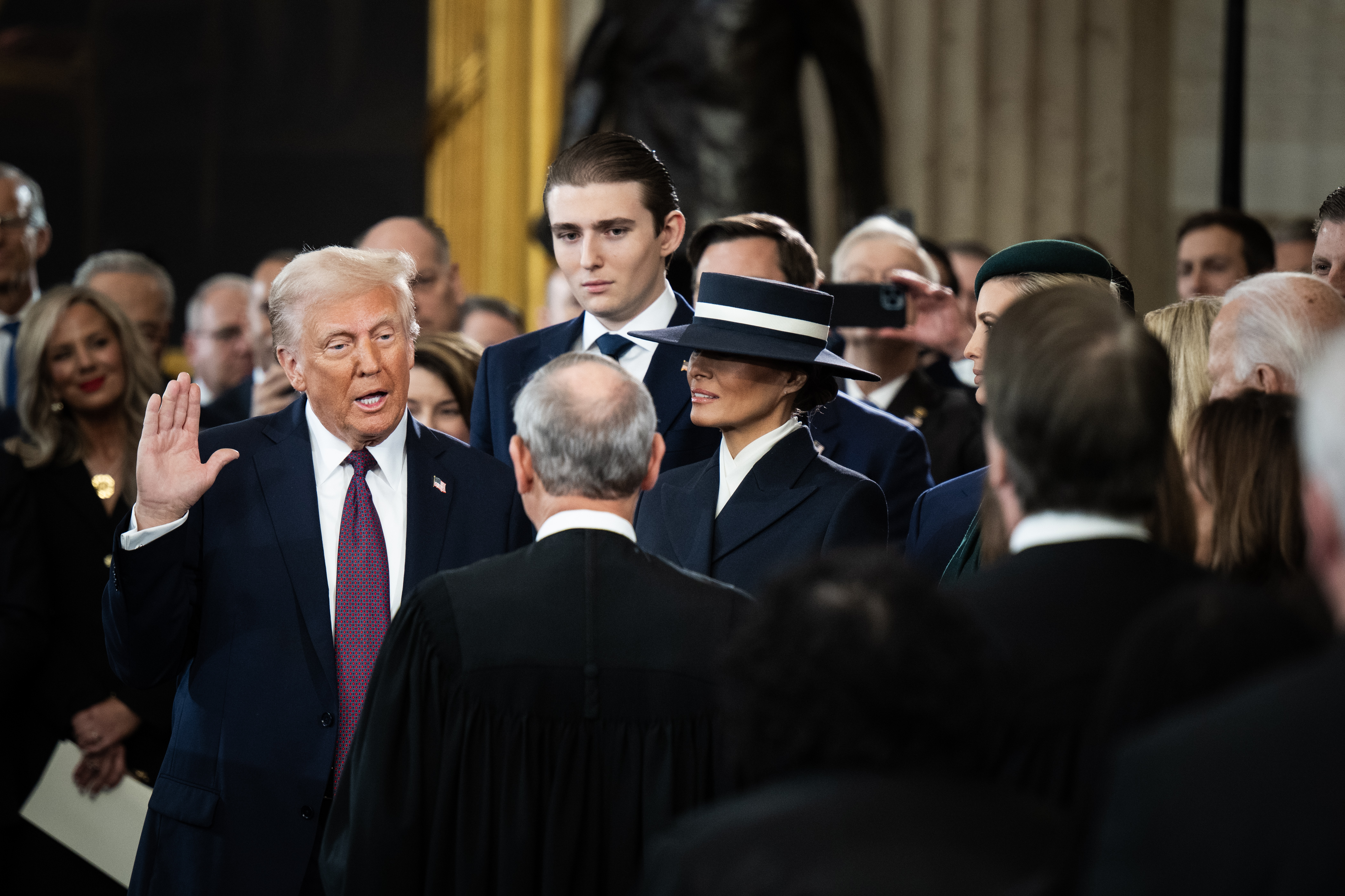
- Donald Trump takes the oath of office as the 47th president of the United States.
- Date: January 20, 2025; 21 months ago
- Location: United States Capitol, Washington, D.C.
- Organized by: Joint Congressional Committee on Inaugural Ceremonies
- Participants: Donald Trump; 47th president of the United States — Assuming office John Roberts; Chief Justice of the United States — Administering oath JD Vance; 50th vice president of the United States — Assuming office Brett Kavanaugh; Associate Justice of the Supreme Court of the United States — Administering oath
- Website: The 60th Presidential Inauguration; Trump Vance Inaugural Committee (archived)
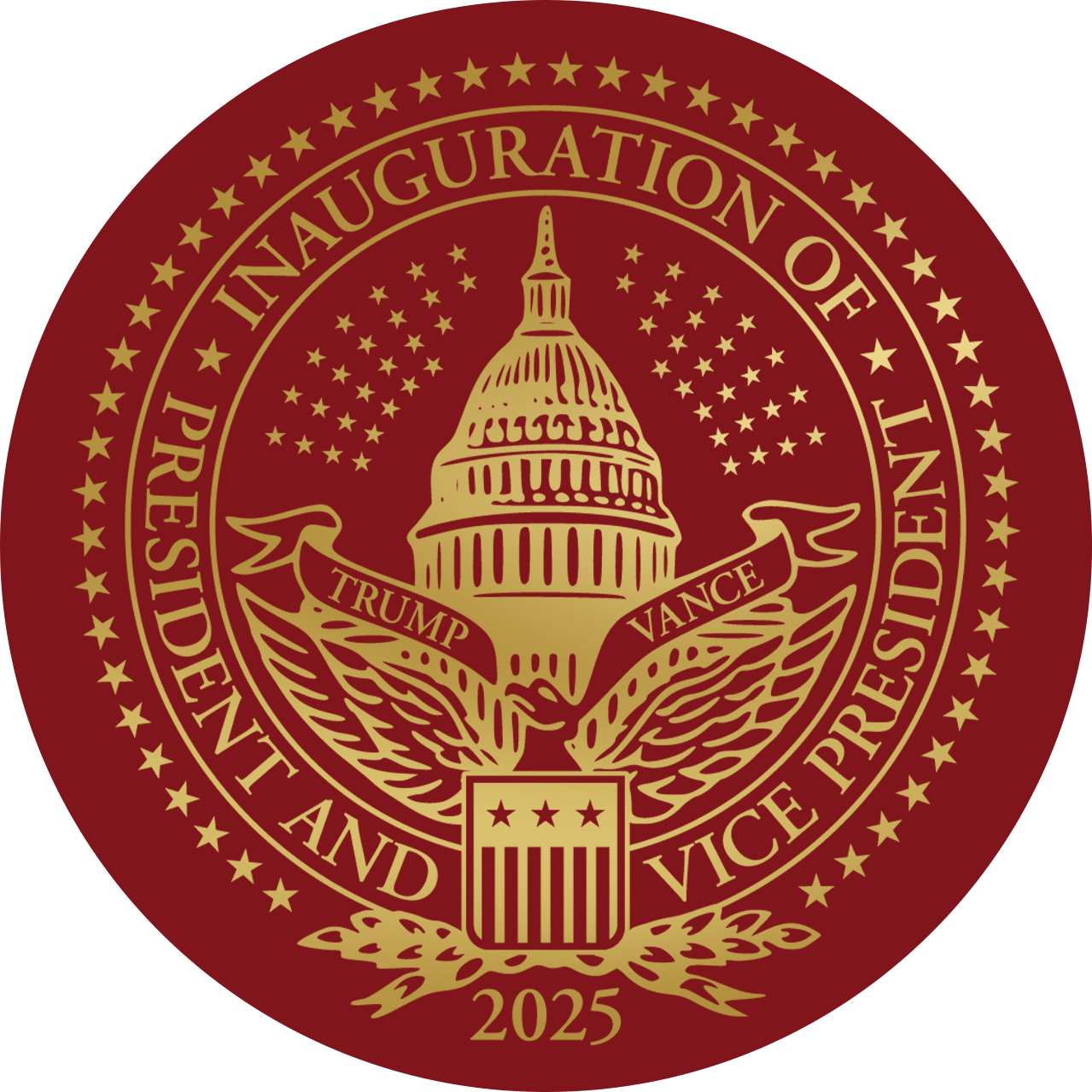

The inauguration of Donald Trump as the 47th president of the United States took place on Monday, January 20, 2025. Due to freezing temperatures and high winds, it was held inside the U.S. Capitol rotunda in Washington, D.C. It was the 60th U.S. presidential inauguration and the second inauguration of Trump as U.S. president, marking the commencement of his second and final presidential term, and the only term of JD Vance as vice president. It was the second re-inauguration for a former U.S. president, after the second inauguration of Grover Cleveland in 1893. Trump's first inauguration was eight years earlier, on January 20, 2017.

The event included a swearing-in ceremony, a signing ceremony, an inaugural luncheon, a first honors ceremony, and then a procession and parade at Capital One Arena. Inaugural balls were held at various venues before and after the inaugural ceremonies. The Capitol rotunda can seat approximately 600 people; the number of attendees has not been disclosed.

== Context ==
The inauguration marked the formal culmination of Donald Trump's presidential transition that began with his election on November 6, 2024, him becoming the president-elect. Trump and his running mate JD Vance were formally elected by the Electoral College on December 17, 2024. The victory was certified by an electoral vote tally by a joint session of Congress on January 6, 2025. In accordance with Article I, Section 6 of the United States Constitution, Vance resigned his seat in the U.S. Senate effective midnight on January 10, 2025.

== Planning ==
Held on the third Monday of January, the inauguration was on the same day as Martin Luther King Jr. Day, which marked the third time an inauguration occurred on the same date as the holiday, following the second inaugurations of Bill Clinton in 1997 and Barack Obama in 2013 (January 21). On January 17, Trump announced the inauguration ceremony would be moved inside to the Capitol rotunda due to expected cold weather, like the public second inauguration of Ronald Reagan on January 21, 1985. (Note: January 20 fell on a Sunday in 1957, 1985, and 2013, private swearing in ceremonies took place on those days while a public inauguration took place the following day in these years.)

=== Joint Congressional Committee ===
In May 2024, both houses of Congress appointed a Joint Committee on Inaugural Ceremonies to oversee the construction of the platform and other temporary structures that were expected to be used for the later-canceled outdoor ceremonies and celebrations.

Construction of the inaugural platform ceremonially began on September 18, 2024, with the driving of the first nail by United States senator Amy Klobuchar using a nail made from iron ore mined and processed from the Iron Range in Minnesota.

=== Security and operations ===
Soldiers of the Wyoming National Guard undergo civil disturbance training in preparation for deployment to Washington, D.C.

In October 2024, the United States Capitol Police conducted an intelligence assessment that concluded an activist group "with a history of large-scale demonstrations involving illegal activity plans to protest the Inauguration regardless of the outcome" and that other groups protesting the Gaza war were "nearly certain to target the Inauguration" regardless of who would be elected president. On January 18, thousands of protesters took part in the People's March, a follow-up event to the 2017 Women's March, which took place before Trump's first inauguration.

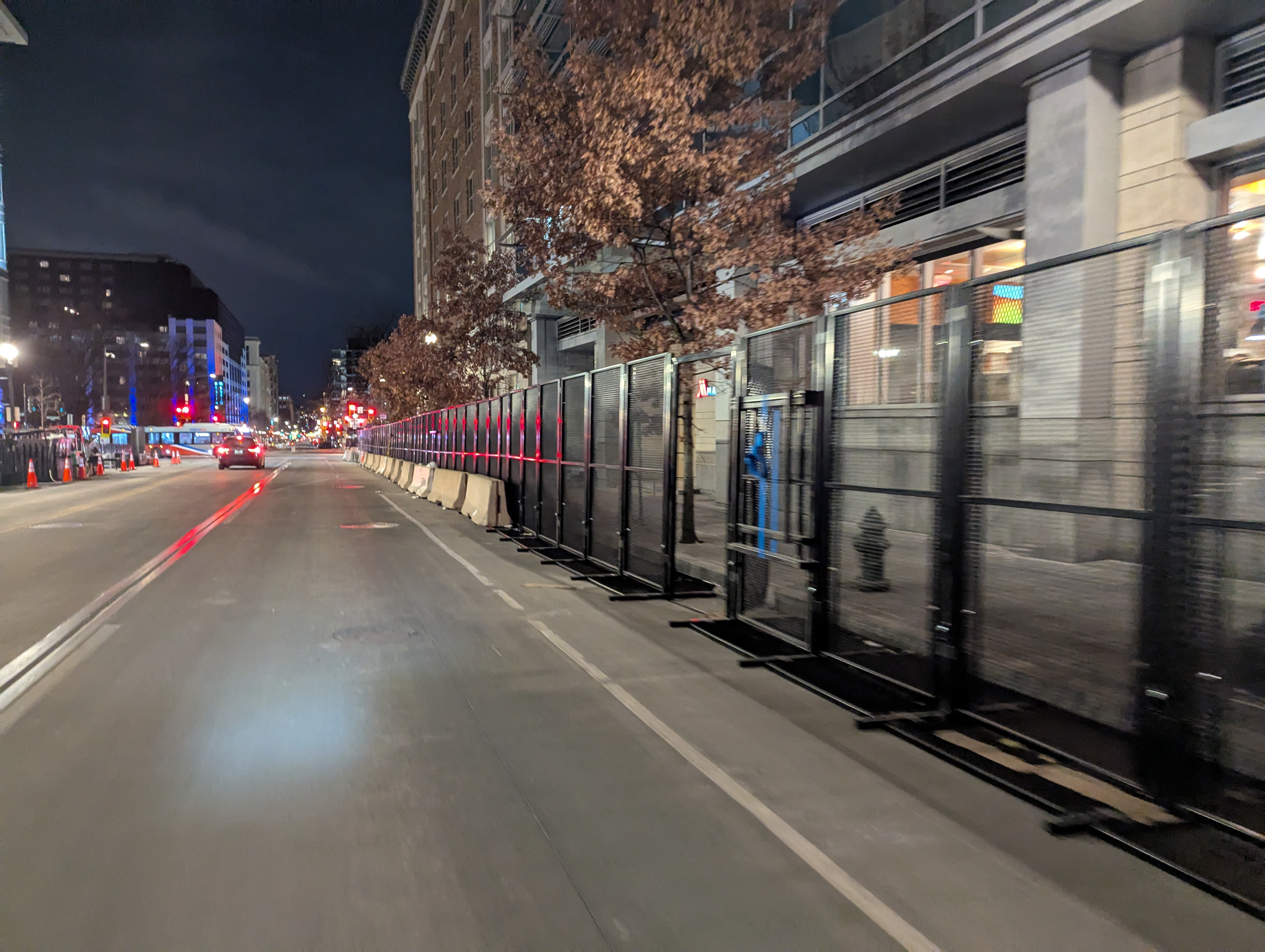
Security fencing in Washington, D.C., ahead of the inauguration

Agencies expected to be involved with planning of the ceremony include the U.S. Capitol Police, the Washington, D.C., Metropolitan Police, and the U.S. Park Police. Twenty-four states offered National Guard support for the electoral vote certification and inaugural ceremonies.

On January 17, approximately 8,000 National Guard soldiers were deputized as special deputy United States marshals, providing them police authority within Washington, D.C.

=== Inaugural Committee ===
On November 9, 2024, Trump announced the formation of the Trump Vance Inaugural Committee, Inc., a 501(c)(4) organization dedicated to planning inaugural events. The committee co-chairs were real-estate developer Steve Witkoff and former U.S. senator Kelly Loeffler, longtime friends and supporters of Trump.

==== Donations ====
Various technology companies and their leaders pledged donations and services for the inauguration. OpenAI CEO Sam Altman said through a spokesperson that he would make a $1 million personal donation. Mark Zuckerberg, the head of Meta and the parent company of Facebook and Instagram, sent $1 million. It was also reported in The Wall Street Journal that Amazon's CEO, Jeff Bezos, offered to stream the ceremony on Amazon Prime Video, and this amounted to a $1 million in-kind donation on top of a $1 million cash donation. Apple CEO Tim Cook personally donated $1 million. Uber and its CEO Dara Khosrowshahi each agreed to donate $1 million to the inauguration. Alphabet donated $1 million and supported an inauguration livestream with a direct link on the homepage of YouTube. Microsoft, Adobe, and Perplexity also donated $1 million. NPR quoted Margaret O'Mara, a Silicon Valley historian at the University of Washington, as saying these donations were due to some of these tech leaders, having previously been in conflict with Trump, wishing to reduce regulatory pressure on their companies under the incoming administration.

Ford Motor Company and General Motors announced that they would donate $1 million each and provide a fleet of vehicles for the inauguration. Toyota, Chevron, Hyundai, and Stellantis also donated $1 million.

Various financial services businesses and their leaders donated at least $1 million, including Goldman Sachs, Bank of America, JPMorgan, Kraken, Coinbase, Intuit, Robinhood, Ken Griffin, Ripple, and Ondo Finance.

Major donors from the telecommunications industry included AT&T, Comcast, and Charter Communications.

Major donors from the healthcare and pharmaceutical industry included PhRMA, Pfizer, and Hims & Hers.

Major donors from the manufacturing and industrial sector included Stanley Black & Decker, Pratt Industries, Boeing, and Lockheed Martin.

Other major donors included Delta Air Lines and McDonald's.

In April 2025, it was reported that $239 million was donated to Trump's inaugural committee, more than doubling the previous record of $107 million raised for Trump's 2017 inauguration, including 29 gifts totaling $13 million from subsidiaries of companies based outside the United States.

== Pre-inaugural events ==
=== Arlington National Cemetery wreath laying ceremony ===
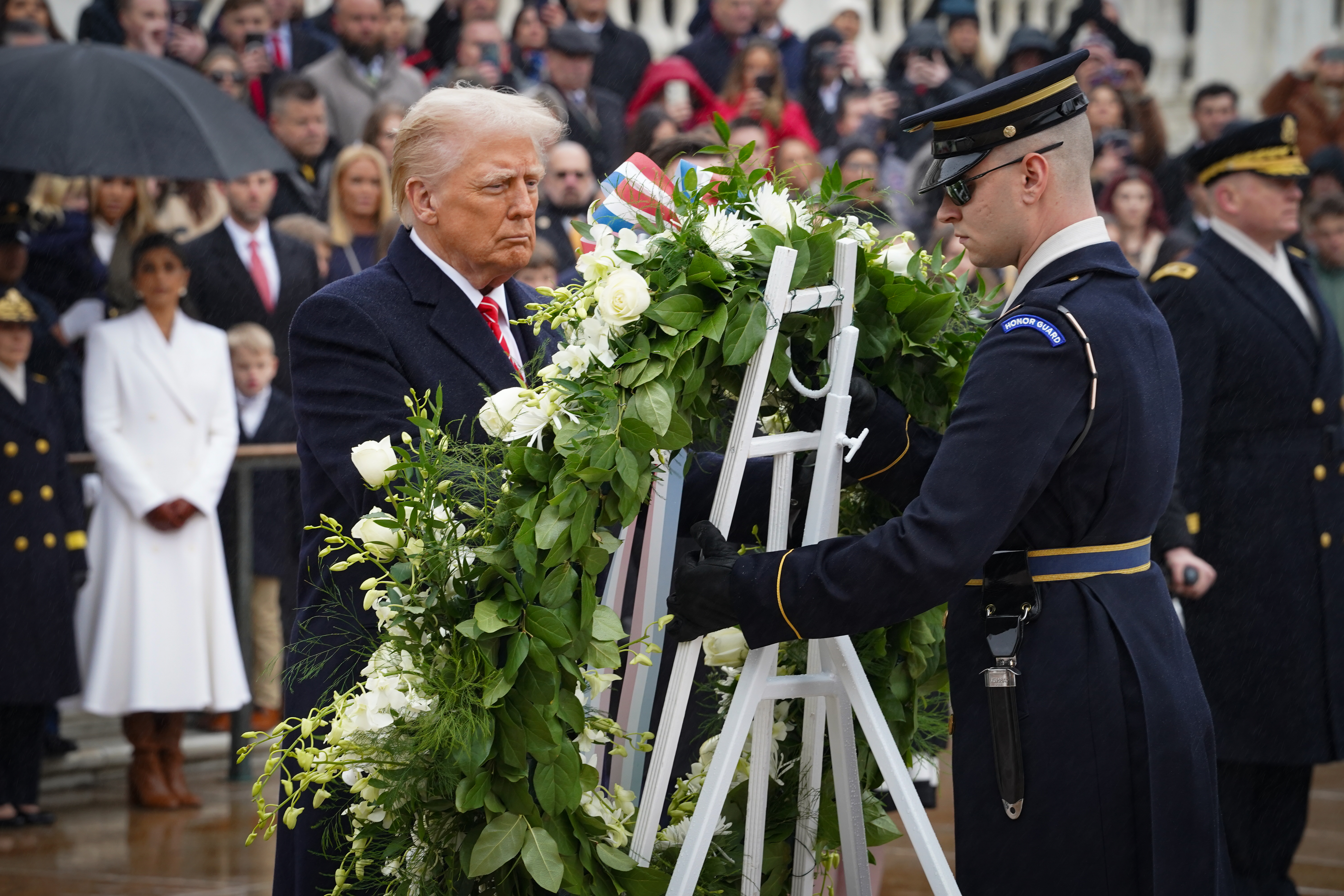
Trump places a wreath at the Tomb of the Unknown Soldier on January 19, 2025.

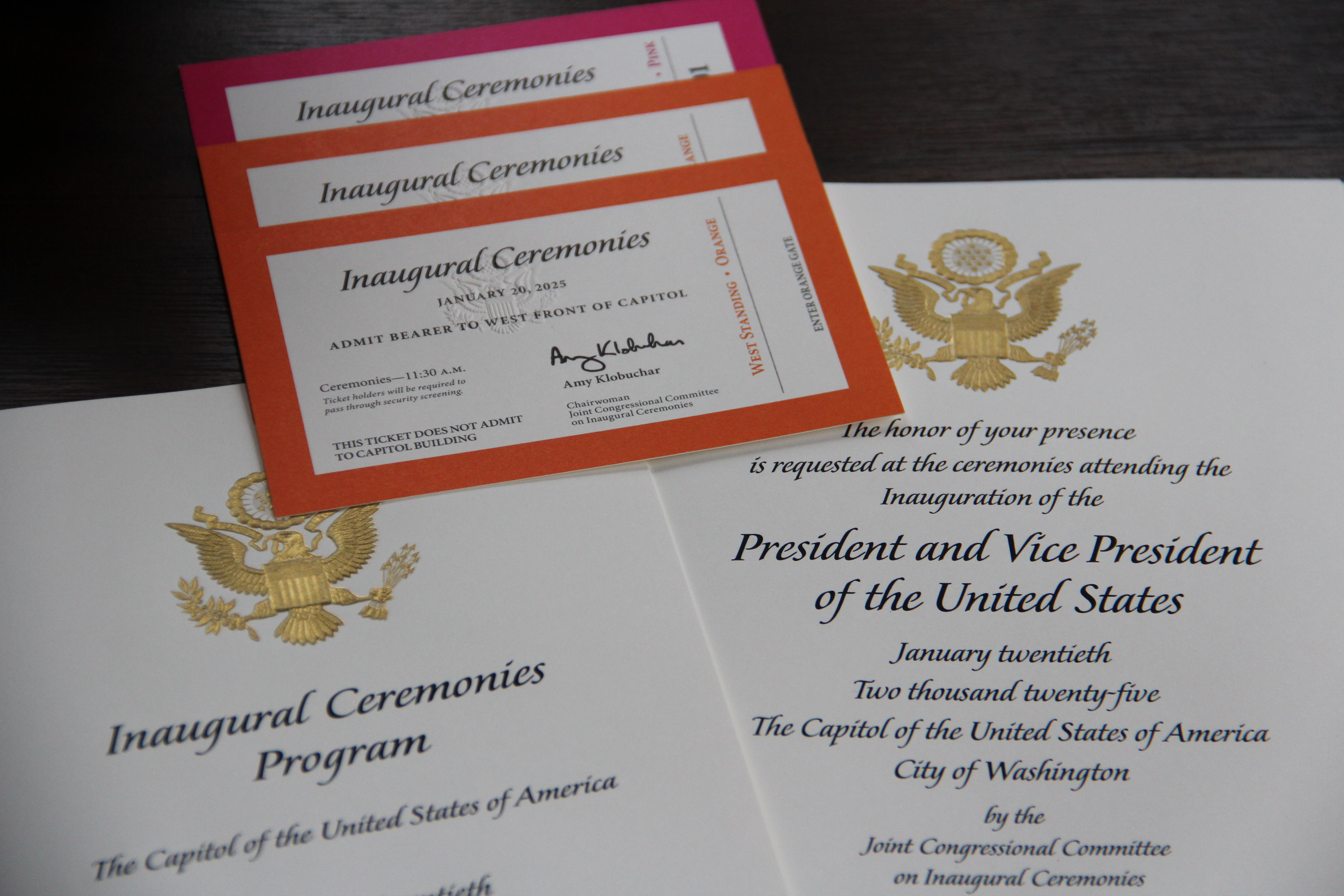
Tickets and invitation to the inauguration as originally planned on the West Front of the U.S. Capitol

On the morning of January 19, Trump and Vice President-elect Vance visited the Arlington National Cemetery, where they placed a wreath at the Tomb of the Unknown Soldier. They were joined by family members of some of the victims of the 2021 Kabul airport attack.

=== Make America Great Again Victory Rally ===
On the evening of January 19, the Trump campaign organized the "Make America Great Again Victory Rally", a rally for supporters at Capital One Arena in Washington, D.C. The event featured performances by Kid Rock and Lee Greenwood, as well as speeches by Trump and Megyn Kelly. Trump also performed his signature dance to a rendition of "Y.M.C.A." performed by Village People, who joined him on stage.

=== Church service and White House reception ===
On the morning of the inauguration, on January 20, after staying the night at the Blair House, the traditional house used by the incoming president-elect due to its proximity to the White House, Trump and his wife, Melania, and JD Vance and his wife, Usha, attended a church service at St. John's Episcopal Church. Every president since James Madison has attended the church at least once, while every president since Franklin D. Roosevelt has attended it on the day of their inauguration. The service was led by Robert Jeffress, a Southern Baptist minister who campaigned for Trump during the election.

After the church service, Trump and his wife went to the White House to meet with President Joe Biden and First Lady Jill Biden. The Bidens greeted the Trumps, and they then posed for photos in front of the White House press corps. Afterward, they held a tea reception inside the White House, along with Vice President Kamala Harris and her husband, Doug Emhoff, and JD Vance and his wife, Usha Vance. As per tradition, following the meeting between the president and the president-elect, they shared the presidential motorcade limousine, and made their way to the Capitol for the inaugural ceremony.

== Inaugural events ==
=== Presidential communications ===
The transfer of power included the transition of official administration X (formerly named Twitter) accounts @POTUS and @VP. Members of the Trump administration also assumed ownership of a number of institutional accounts, including @WhiteHouse, @FLOTUS for First Lady Melania Trump, @SLOTUS for Second Lady Usha Vance, @WHCOS for White House chief of staff Susie Wiles, and @PressSec for White House press secretary Karoline Leavitt. New executive branch websites were initialized; previous administrations' websites reside in the National Archives.

=== Attendees ===
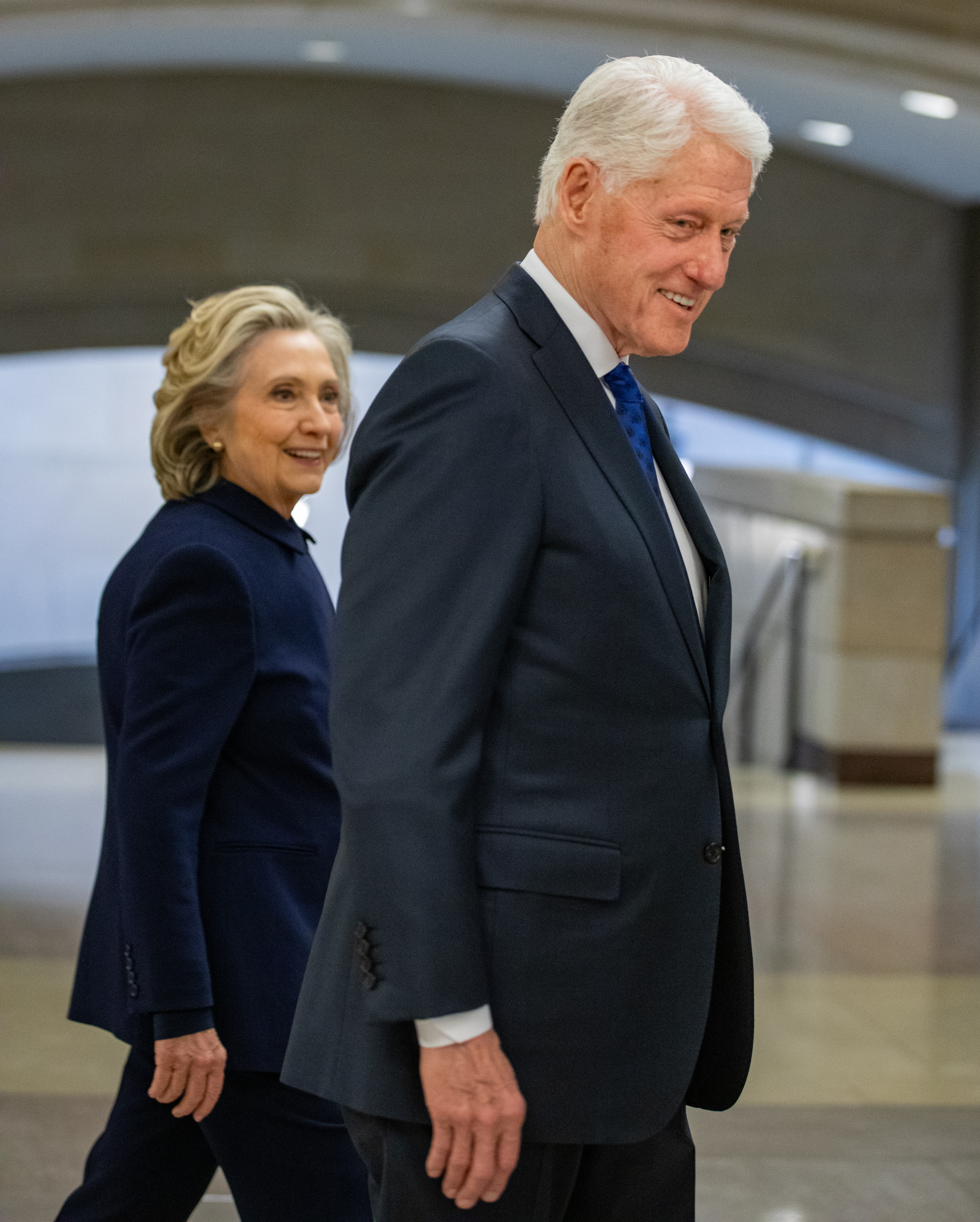
Former President Bill Clinton and former First Lady Hillary Clinton

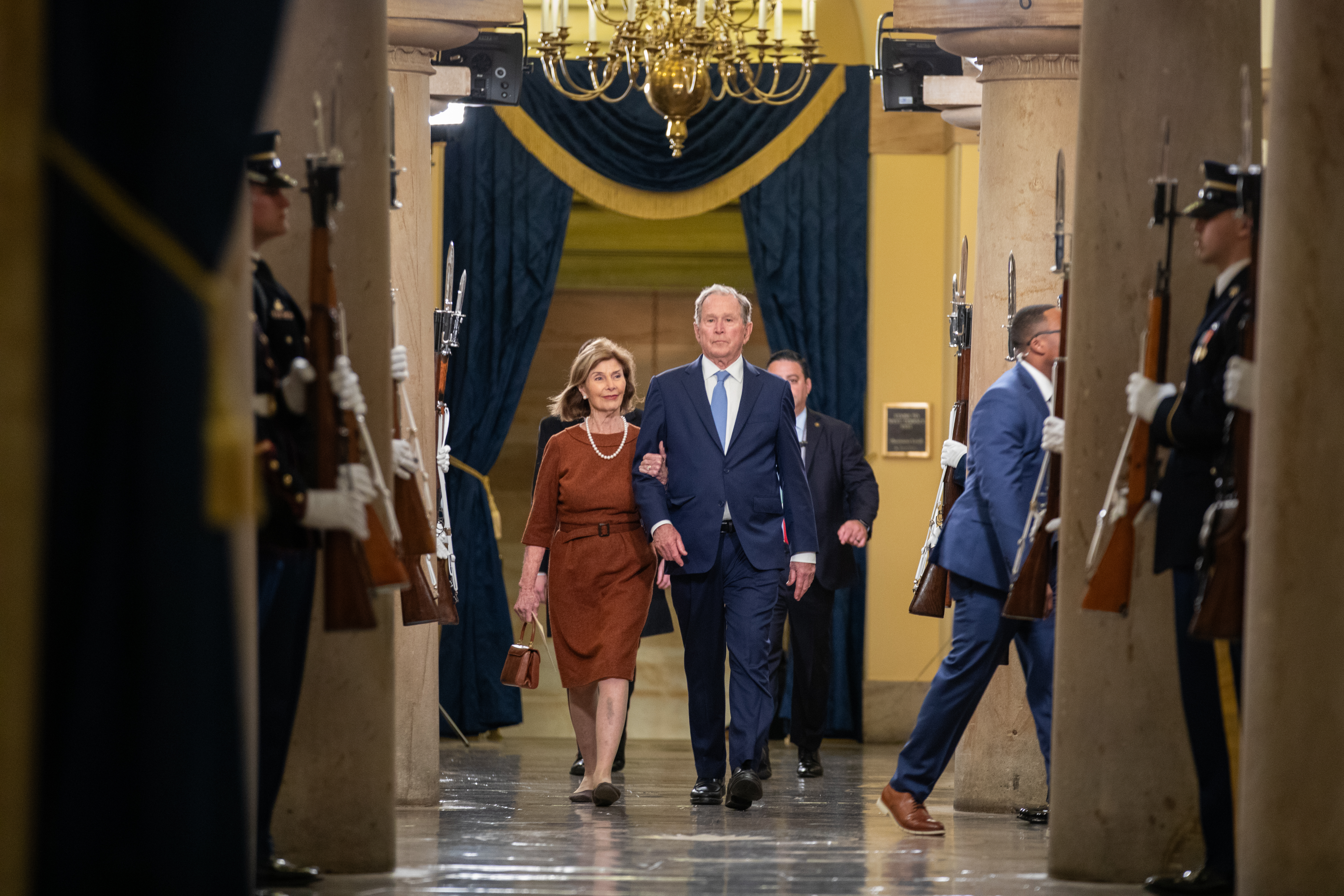
Former President George W. Bush and former First Lady Laura Bush

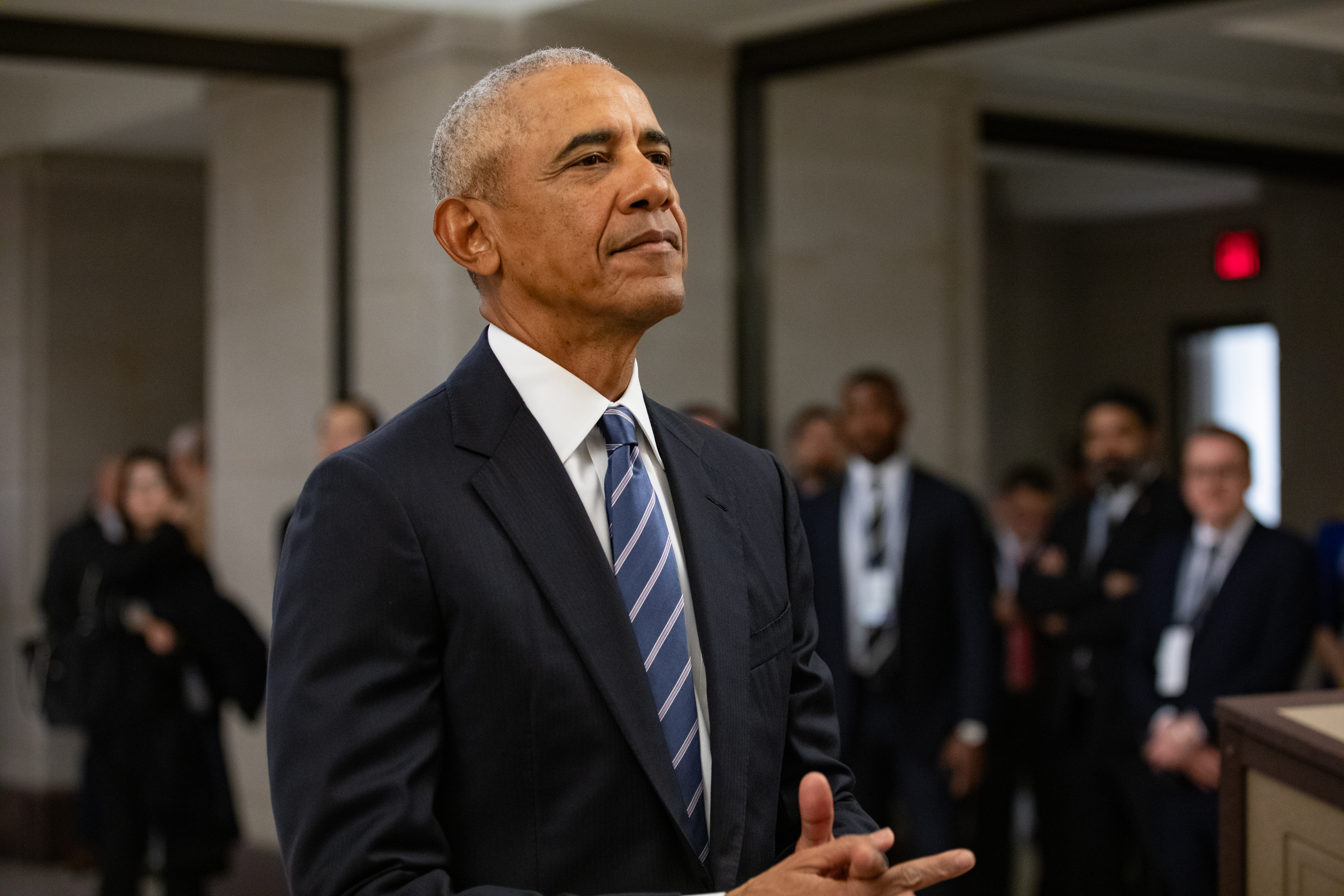
Former President Barack Obama

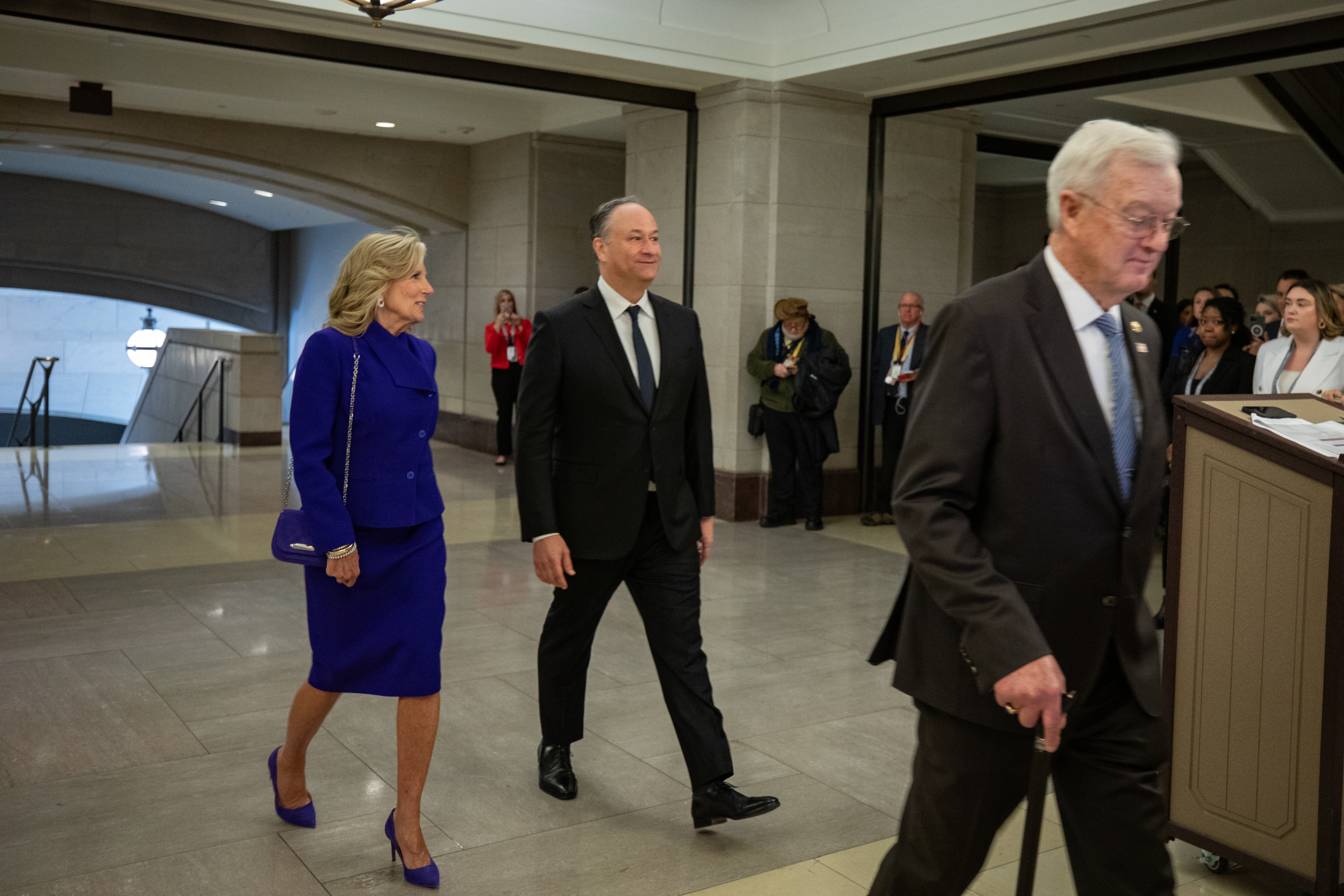
Outgoing First Lady Jill Biden and outgoing Second Gentleman Douglas Emhoff

Trump's inauguration marked the first time that a U.S. president-elect formally welcomed foreign leaders to the ceremony.

Outgoing U.S. president Joe Biden (who defeated Trump in 2020 and was inaugurated as the 46th president in 2021), outgoing U.S. vice president Kamala Harris (who had been Trump's main opponent in 2024), former U.S. presidents Bill Clinton, George W. Bush, and Barack Obama (whom Trump first succeeded in 2017) attended the inauguration. Former first ladies Hillary Clinton (Trump's former opponent in 2016) and Laura Bush also attended the inauguration, but former first lady Michelle Obama was absent. Former U.S. vice presidents Dan Quayle and Mike Pence (who served under Trump during his first term) and former second lady Marilyn Quayle were also in attendance, while former vice presidents Al Gore and Dick Cheney and former second lady Karen Pence were absent. New York mayor Eric Adams and media proprietor Rupert Murdoch also attended the inauguration.

Chinese president Xi Jinping was invited to the ceremony, but sent vice president Han Zheng as his special representative instead. This marked the first time a senior official of China's government was sent to a US presidential inauguration. El Salvador's president Nayib Bukele and Italian prime minister Giorgia Meloni were also reportedly invited. Israeli prime minister Benjamin Netanyahu initially planned to attend, but ultimately did not after not receiving a formal invitation. Argentine president Javier Milei and the last democratically elected Georgian president Salome Zourabichvili had been reportedly planning to attend. Former Brazilian president Jair Bolsonaro has indicated that he was an invitee, but he would have needed his confiscated passport to be returned by the government in order to travel. Russia confirmed that President Vladimir Putin did not receive an invitation. Trump stated that he had not invited President Volodymyr Zelenskyy to his inauguration but expressed willingness to welcome him if he decided to attend. Then British Prime Minister Keir Starmer did not attend the inauguration, while former British prime ministers Boris Johnson and Liz Truss attended. Ecuadorian president Daniel Noboa, first lady Lavinia Valbonesi, and Paraguayan president Santiago Peña were also planning to attend. Edmundo González, whom the U.S. government recognizes as the winner of the 2024 Venezuelan presidential election, also reportedly attended.

The foreign ministers of Quad nations, S. Jaishankar from India, Penny Wong from Australia, and Takeshi Iwaya from Japan, also attended the inauguration. They were expected to meet with Trump the day after the ceremony for discussions.

A number of right-wing populist politicians attended the inauguration. French Reconquête politicians Éric Zemmour and Sarah Knafo, National Rally politicians Louis Aliot, Julien Sanchez, and Alexandre Sabatou, and Identity–Liberties leader Marion Maréchal, attended the ceremony. Spanish Vox leader Santiago Abascal, Belgian Vlaams Belang leader Tom Van Grieken, Reform UK leader Nigel Farage, Alternative for Germany (AfD) co-leader Tino Chrupalla, Estonian Conservative People's Party leader Martin Helme, Alliance for the Union of Romanians leader George Simion, Danish People's Party leader Morten Messerschmidt, Portuguese Chega leader Andre Ventura, Hungarian Fidesz vice-president Kinga Gál, and former Polish Prime Minister Mateusz Morawiecki were also in attendance. From the Czech Patriots.eu representation were invited ANO MEP Ondřej Knotek and vice president of the Patriots for Europe MEP Klára Dostálová, Přísaha senator Robert Šlachta, MEP Filip Turek from the Motorists for Themselves, as well as their founder and leader Petr Macinka, the latter of whom – as manager of the Václav Klaus Institute – was also invited to the Foster's Outriders Foundation inauguration ball at the Museum of the Bible to meet Tucker Carlson and Rick Santorum. AfD Members of the Bundestag Jan Wenzel Schmidt and Beatrix von Storch alongside her husband Sven von Storch have confirmed their attendance. AfD co-leader Alice Weidel, Freedom Party of Austria leader Herbert Kickl, and Bulgarian Revival leader Kostadin Kostadinov were invited, but did not attend the ceremony. Hristijan Mickoski, Prime Minister of North Macedonia, was invited to the inauguration.

Numerous businesspeople including Bernard Arnault, Delphine Arnault, Sergey Brin, Elon Musk, Jeff Bezos, and Mark Zuckerberg, among the world's richest people, attended the inauguration. They had a prominent role at the event, seated together on the platform alongside other distinguished guests, including Cabinet nominees and elected officials. TikTok CEO Shou Zi Chew attended the inauguration. Alphabet's Sundar Pichai, Apple's Tim Cook, OpenAI's Sam Altman, Reliance's Mukesh Ambani, and Uber's Dara Khosrowshahi also attended the event. Las Vegas Sands owner Miriam Adelson also attended the ceremony.

Several celebrities and sports figures – including Victor Willis, Carrie Underwood (who sang "America the Beautiful"), Christopher Macchio (who sang the national anthem), Antonio Brown, Mike Tyson, Jorge Masvidal, Evander Kane, Gianni Infantino, Anuel AA, Justin Quiles, Rod Wave, Kodak Black, Lee Greenwood, Fivio Foreign, Jake and Logan Paul, Theo Von, Conor McGregor, Danica Patrick, Dana White, Joe Rogan, and Wayne Gretzky – attended the ceremony. Media personalities Charlie Kirk, Laura Ingraham, and Tucker Carlson also attended the event.

=== Ceremony ===
An order of events for the January 20, 2025, inauguration was published by the Joint Congressional Committee on Inaugural Ceremonies and the National Park Service.

Event	Time	Location	Description	Ref.
Swearing-In Ceremony	12:00 p.m. ET	United States Capitol, rotunda	During the swearing-in ceremony, the president-elect and vice president-elect took the oaths of office, and then the new president delivered the inaugural address.	
Signing Ceremony		President's Room	Following the swearing-in ceremony, the president withdrew to the President's Room (Room S-216), where he had a photo portrait made and signed transitional documents.	
Inaugural Luncheon		National Statuary Hall	The president and vice president attended an inaugural luncheon with Supreme Court justices, leaders of the Senate and House of Representatives, as well as family and other invited guests.	
Pass-in-Review		Emancipation Hall at the Capitol Visitor Center	After the luncheon, the president and vice president reviewed the military forces that formed the processional escort, including the Commander-in-Chief's Guard, the "President's Own" United States Marine Band, and others.	
Procession		Pennsylvania Avenue	Joined by the military escort, the president traveled in the presidential state car.	
Parade	3:00 p.m. ET	Capital One Arena	A parade, consisting of military and civilian marching and performance units from each of the states, traditionally proceeds past the reviewing stand in front of the White House. Due to inclement weather, this was moved indoors and took place at Capital One Arena.	

==== Oaths of office ====
JD Vance takes the vice presidential oath of office, administered by Supreme Court Associate Justice Brett Kavanaugh.

Donald Trump takes the presidential oath of office, administered by Chief Justice John Roberts.

Supreme Court Associate Justice Brett Kavanaugh administered the vice presidential oath of office to JD Vance. It was the first time since 1969 that "Hail, Columbia" was not played for the new vice president immediately upon taking the oath. Chief Justice John Roberts administered the presidential oath of office to Donald Trump. Trump's wife, Melania, held two Bibles for Trump to place his left hand on while reciting the oath, in accordance with custom, but he did not do so. This is merely a tradition; incoming presidents are not required to place their hand on the Bibles.

==== Inaugural address ====
Donald Trump delivers his second inaugural address as president of the United States.

President Trump's inaugural address started with references to the indictments against him, which he described as unfounded and politically motivated, followed by the announcement of the new administration's policy priorities, including immigration restrictions, the easing of environmental regulations, anti-DEI and anti-gender ideology policies, the establishment of a Department of Government Efficiency, and a negotiated settlement to the Russo-Ukrainian war. Trump defined his presidency as the beginning of a golden era for America.

The Washington Post described Trump's inaugural address as attempting to emphasize unity, but as his speeches usually do, it veered off course and came off as "dark". He described himself as chosen by God, and that he was "tested and challenged more than any president in our 250-year history," which The Post noted would place himself above every other president in U.S. history, including George Washington and Abraham Lincoln. Trump invoked the phrase "Manifest Destiny" as he described an expansionist agenda, and criticized Democrats and other leaders. NPR said the speech gave the American public a better idea of what Trump's policies and directives would be, noted he spoke nothing of the January 6th U.S. Capitol attack nor his prior promises of political retribution, and pointed out his derision of the outgoing administration, in front of Biden and Harris, the former president and vice president.

Invocations preceding the inaugural address were offered by Cardinal Timothy M. Dolan, Roman Catholic Archdiocese of New York, and Rev. Franklin Graham of the Billy Graham Evangelistic Association. Benedictions were offered by Pastor Lorenzo Sewell, Rabbi Ari Berman, and Father Frank Mann, Roman Catholic Diocese of Brooklyn. Imam Husham Al-Husainy, a Muslim cleric from Dearborn, Michigan, was initially on the program but did not speak or appear at the event.

=== Post-ceremony events ===
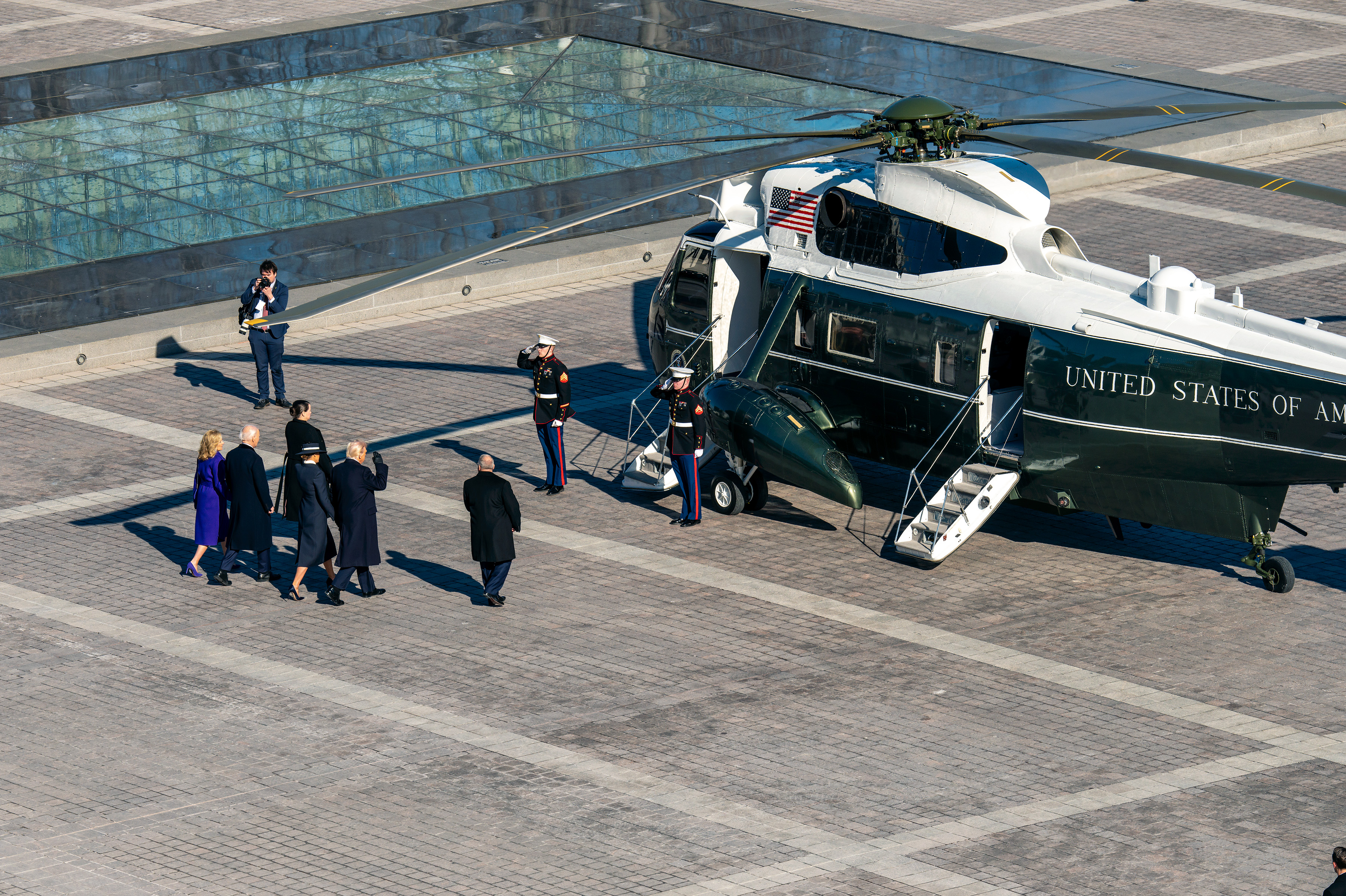
President Donald Trump and First Lady Melania Trump bidding farewell to former president Joe Biden and former first lady Jill Biden on the East Front of the U.S. Capitol

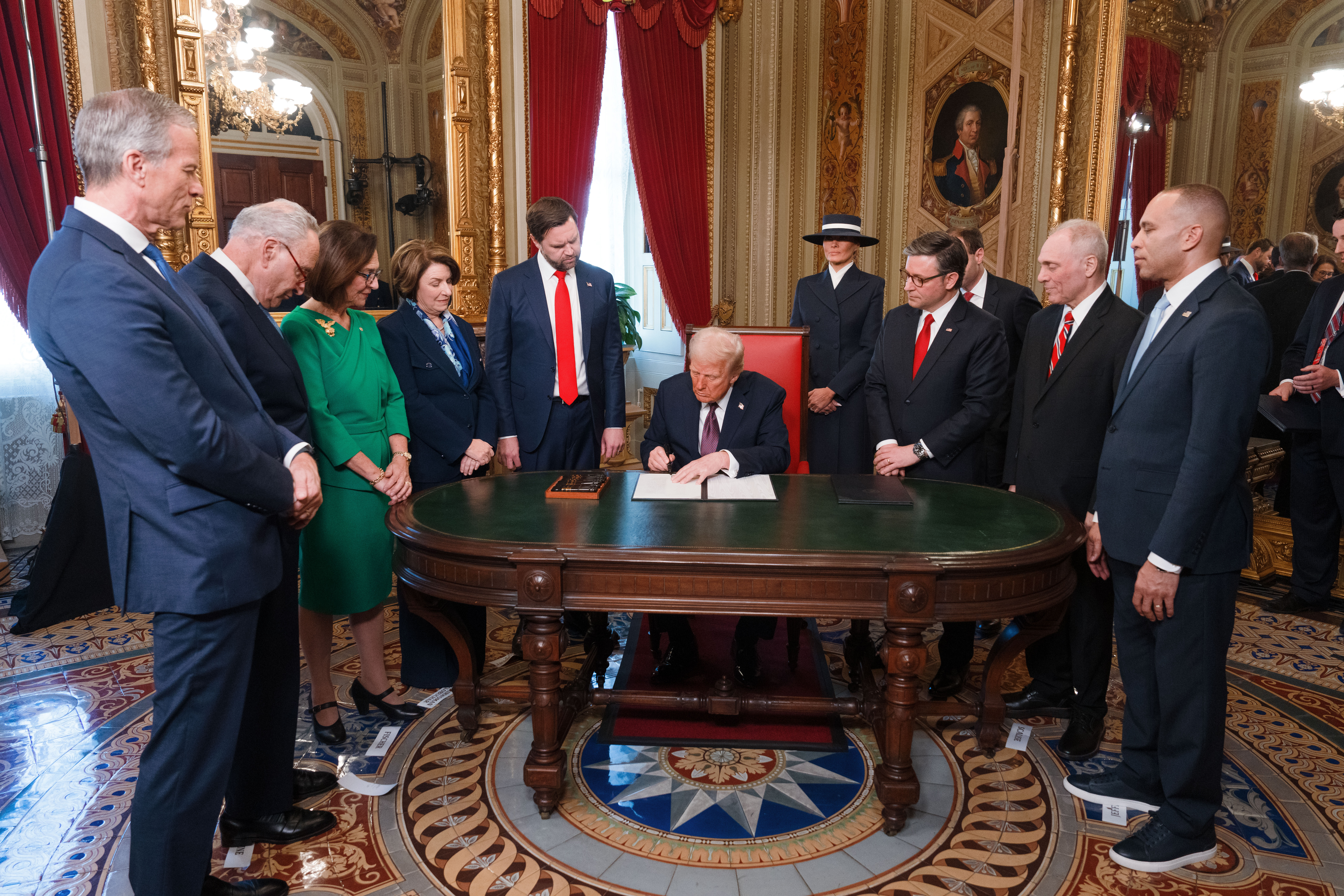
President Trump signing his first official orders as president, including nominating his Cabinet

After the inaugural ceremony, President Donald Trump, First Lady Melania Trump, Vice President JD Vance and Second Lady Usha Vance escorted former president Joe Biden and former first lady Jill Biden to a departure ceremony on the east side of the U.S. Capitol. The Trumps exchanged remarks and bid farewell to the Bidens at the base of the helicopter that would transport them to Joint Base Andrews, and then returned to the steps of the Capitol building where they waved as the Bidens' helicopter took off. Meanwhile, Harris and Emhoff took a limousine and then they boarded a plane for Los Angeles. Following the Bidens' departure, President Trump gave remarks in front of supporters at Emancipation Hall.

==== Elon Musk salute controversy ====
Musk giving the gesture before saying "My heart goes out to you. It is thanks to you that the future of civilization is assured."

During a post-ceremony event, businessman and political figure Elon Musk delivered a speech amongst others within Capital One Arena. At one point during his speech, Musk twice made a gesture interpreted by many as a Nazi or a fascist Roman salute. (Note: The "Roman salute" is a gesture which was used by Italian Fascists, then adopted by the Nazis. It is not believed to have been used by ancient Romans.) He thumped his right hand over his heart, fingers spread wide, and then extended his right arm out, emphatically, at an upward angle, palm down and fingers together. He then repeated the gesture to the crowd behind him. As he finished the gestures, he said to the crowd, "My heart goes out to you. It is thanks to you that the future of civilization is assured."

The salute led to worldwide backlash and protests against Musk. It was widely condemned as an intentional Nazi salute in Germany, where making such gestures is illegal. The Anti-Defamation League said it was not a Nazi salute, but other Jewish organizations disagreed and condemned the salute. American public opinion was divided on partisan lines as to whether it was a fascist salute. Musk dismissed the accusations of Nazi sympathies, deriding them as "dirty tricks" and a "tired" attack. Neo-Nazi and white supremacist groups celebrated it as a Nazi salute. Multiple European political parties demanded that Musk be banned from entering their countries.

=== Inaugural balls ===
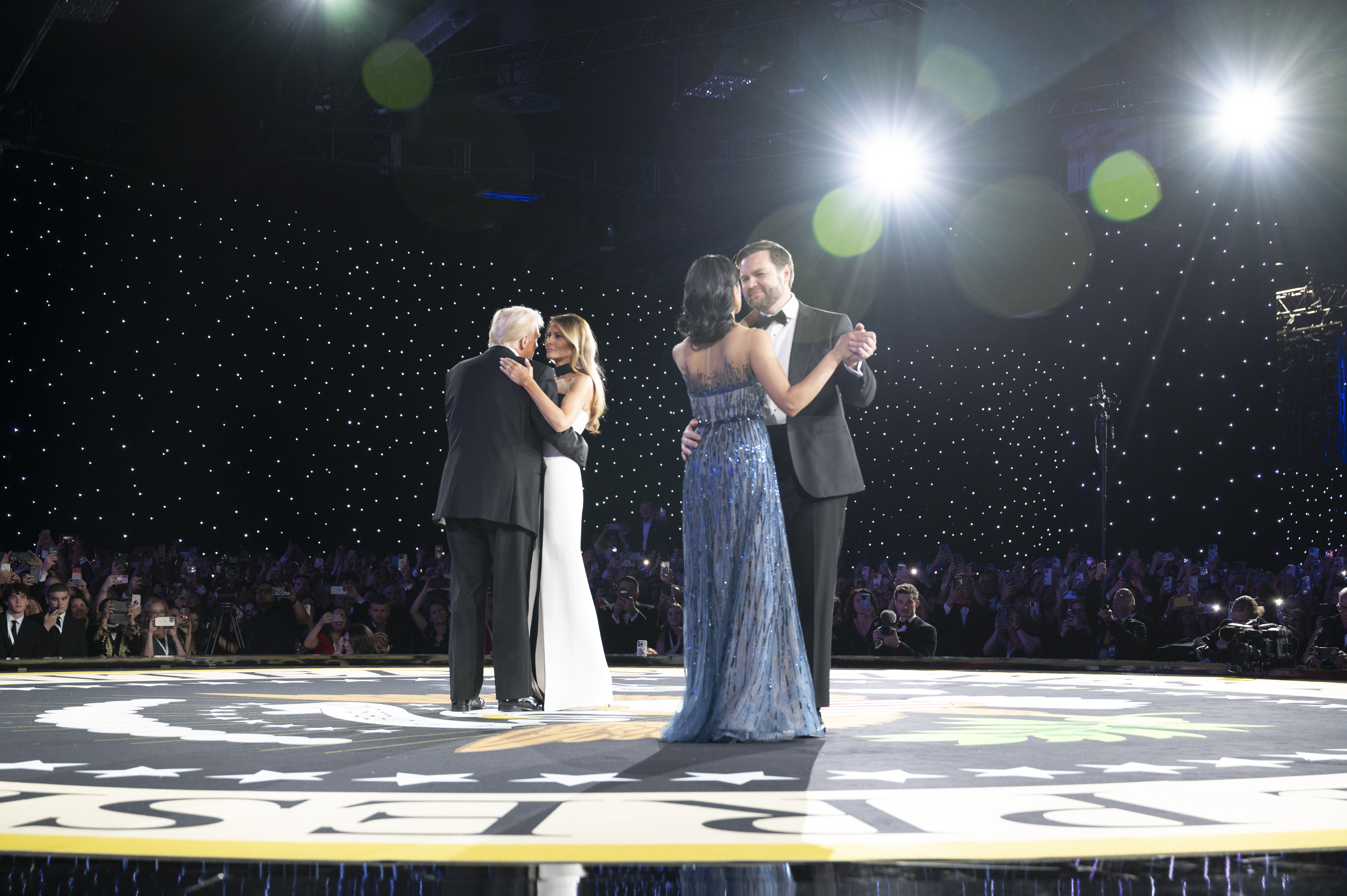
The Trumps (left) and Vances (right) dance during the Liberty Ball at the Washington Convention Center.

Customarily, inaugural balls are held at various venues before and after the inaugural ceremonies. Official balls, at which the president and first lady appear, are organized by the inaugural committee, while unofficial balls are not.

Three official inaugural balls occurred, at which performers including Nelly, Rascal Flatts, and Jason Aldean appeared. A larger number of unofficial balls were organized.

== Viewership ==
Approximately 24.6 million total viewers watched the inauguration across 15 networks. The viewership number peaked at 34.4 million when Trump took the oath of office at 12:15 PM ET. Viewership was lower than that of Biden's 2021 inauguration as well as Trump's first inauguration in 2017. The figures below, Nielsen data sourced from Adweek, do not include streaming figures.

Legend

Cable news network
Broadcast network

Total viewers
11:30 AM to 1:00 PM EST

Network	Total viewers	A25–54
FNC	11.4 million	2.4 million
ABC	4.9 million	1.2 million
NBC	4.8 million	1.3 million
CBS	4.6 million	1.1 million
CNN	1.9 million	605,000
MSNBC	938,000	148,000

Total viewers
12:00 to 1:00 PM EST

Network	Total viewers	A25–54
FNC	11.7 million	2.5 million
CNN	1.9 million	614,000
MSNBC	974,000	150,000

Total viewers (prime time)
8:00 to 11:00 PM EST

Network	Total viewers	A25–54
FNC	6.3 million	1.1 million
CNN	1.1 million	286,000
MSNBC	1.1 million	102,000

== Protests ==
=== Boycott ===
Several members of the Democratic Party in the 119th Congress decided to boycott the inauguration. This boycott was perceived as an initial opposition to the incoming administration.

Multiple reasons were given for the decision to boycott, including the event coinciding with Martin Luther King Jr. Day events and memories from the January 6 United States Capitol attack. As of December 14, below is a list of House Democrats who publicly stated they would not be attending the inauguration:

- Donald Beyer (D-VA)
- Suzanne Bonamici (D-OR)
- Greg Casar (D-TX)
- Sean Casten (D-IL)
- Judy Chu (D-CA)
- Steve Cohen (D-TN)
- Alexandria Ocasio-Cortez (D-NY)
- Bonnie Watson Coleman (D-NJ)
- Jasmine Crockett (D-TX)
- Veronica Escobar (D-TX)
- Kweisi Mfume (D-MD)
- Ilhan Omar (D-MN)
- Nancy Pelosi (D-CA)
- Mark Pocan (D-WI)
- Ayanna Pressley (D-MA)
- Delia Ramirez (D-IL)
- Deborah Ross (D-NC)
- Lateefah Simon (D-CA)
- Adam Smith (D-WA)
- Ritchie Torres (D-NY)
- Sylvester Turner (D-TX)
- Yassamin Ansari (D-AZ)

=== Demonstrations and rallies ===
Protest rallies and marches occurred in cities and towns all over the United States the weekend before and on the day of the inauguration. Organizers of the Women's March (which first took place the day after Trump's first inauguration and every year thereafter) rebranded their event the People's March and had events in at least 70 locations. The People's March was co-organized with Abortion Rights Now, Sierra Club, Planned Parenthood, ACLU and National Women's Law Center. Attendance at one of the Washington marches was, according to the Associated Press, "far fewer than the expected 50,000 participants, already just one-tenth the size of the first [2017] march".

"We Fight Back" rallies, organized by the People's Forum, Party for Socialism and Liberation, the ANSWER Coalition, Democratic Socialists of America, Dream Defenders, CODEPINK, labor unions, tenant unions and other groups were held in 90 locations.

Around the world, anti-Trump protests occurred at consulates and elsewhere in Mexico City, London, Paris, Brussels, Amsterdam, Berlin, Edinburgh, Lisbon, Prague, Warsaw, Panama City, and Manila.

== See also ==
- Don Colossus – Sculpture of Trump unveiled during pre-inauguration events
- Donald Trump 2024 presidential campaign – American political campaign
- Elon Musk salute controversy – 2025 American political controversy
- Second presidential transition of Donald Trump – Transfer of presidential power from Joe Biden to Donald Trump
- First 100 days of the second Trump presidency – Period from January to April 2025
- First inauguration of Donald Trump – 58th United States presidential inauguration
- List of immigration raids and arrests in the second Trump presidency
- Second presidency of Donald Trump – U.S. presidential administration since 2025
- Timeline of the second Trump presidency (2025 Q1)
- Timeline of the second Trump presidency (2025 Q2)
