= Senate district 56 – Břeclav =

Electoral district in the Czech Republic

56 – Břeclav
- inline Senate district of the Czech Republic

- The Břeclav district on a map
- Senator: Robert Šlachta; Přísaha
- Region: South Moravia
- District: Břeclav; Brno-venkov
- Last election: 2024
- Next election: 2030

Senate district 56 – Břeclav is an electoral district of the Senate of the Czech Republic, located in the entirety of the Břeclav District and the southern part of the Brno-Country District. Since 2024, the Senator for the district is Robert Šlachta of the Přísaha movement.

== Senators ==
Year	Senator	Party
1996	Jiří Pavlov	ODS
2000	Vladimír Schovánek	4KOALICE
2006	Jan Hajda	ČSSD
2012	Jan Hajda	ČSSD
2018	Rostislav Koštial	ODS
2024	Róbert Šlachta	Přísaha

== Election results ==
=== 1996 ===
1996 Czech Senate election in Břeclav
Candidate	Party	1st round		2nd round	
Candidate	Party	Votes	%	Votes	%
Jiří Pavlov	ODS	11 292	37,27	13 764	50,29
Tomáš Krejčiřík	ČSSD	5 321	17,56	13 605	49,71
Vojtěch Jedlička	KSČM	5 158	17,02	—	—
Tomáš Zejda	ODA	3 723	12,29	—	—
Václav Petrásek	ČMUS	2 982	9,84	—	—
Pavel Klak	ČSNS	1 314	4,34	—	—
Ladislav Froněk	KSČ	508	1,68	—	—

=== 2000 ===
2000 Czech Senate election in Břeclav
Candidate	Party	1st round		2nd round	
Candidate	Party	Votes	%	Votes	%
Vladimír Schovánek	4KOALICE	7 153	24,53	18 191	67,38
Marta Strušková	KSČM	6 892	23,63	8 806	32,61
Jan Hajda	ČSSD	4 748	16,28	—	—
Leo Čuda	ODS	3 883	13,31	—	—
Helena Omachlíková	Independent	3 578	12,27	—	—
Josef Bendl	Independent	2 716	9,31	—	—
Lotar Indruch	MD	185	0,63	—	—

=== 2006 ===
2006 Czech Senate election in Břeclav
Candidate	Party	1st round		2nd round	
Candidate	Party	Votes	%	Votes	%
Jan Hajda	ČSSD	10 883	26,57	11 707	57,71
Milan Blažek	ODS	8 475	20,60	8 578	42,28
Jan Koráb	KDU-ČSL	6 210	15,16	—	—
Ludmila Živná	KSČM	4 984	12,16	—	—
Jiří Matuška	SZ	3 159	7,71	—	—
Vladimír Schovánek	US-DEU	2 838	6,92	—	—
Zdeněk Petr	SNK ED	1 948	4,75	—	—
Josef Ševčík	SN	1 646	4,01	—	—
Josef Vašíček	Independent	816	1,99	—	—

=== 2012 ===
2012 Czech Senate election in Břeclav
Candidate	Party	1st round		2nd round	
Candidate	Party	Votes	%	Votes	%
Jan Hajda	ČSSD	7 992	26,57	9 168	65,54
Zdeněk Tesařík	KSČM	5 466	18,17	4 819	34,45
Richard Zemánek	KDU-ČSL	3 263	10,85	—	—
Pavel Procházka	ODS	3 074	10,22	—	—
Eva Klimovičová	Independent	2 865	9,52	—	—
Miroslav Volařík	KONS	2 269	7,54	—	—
Luděk Mikulecký	TOP 09, STAN	2 201	7,31	—	—
Radim Uzel	SPOZ	1 408	4,68	—	—
Zbyněk Chlumecký	SNK ED	1 252	4,16	—	—
Stanislav Palša	NÁR.SOC.	283	0,94	—	—

=== 2018 ===
2018 Czech Senate election in Břeclav
Candidate	Party	1st round		2nd round	
Candidate	Party	Votes	%	Votes	%
Rostislav Koštial	ODS	11 399	27,11	10 403	64,03
Libor Nazarčuk	ANO 2011	8 692	20,67	5 843	35,96
Richard Zemánek	KDU-ČSL	6 461	15,36	—	—
Zdeněk Tesařík	KSČM	6 137	14,59	—	—
Jaroslav Válka	ČSSD	3 322	7,90	—	—
Richard Novák	SPD	3 263	7,76	—	—
Karel Štogl	Pirates	2 764	6,57	—	—

=== 2024 ===
2024 Czech Senate election in Břeclav
Candidate	Party	1st round		2nd round	
Candidate	Party	Votes	%	Votes	%
Robert Šlachta	Přísaha	8 099	24,74	8 614	58,88
Miloslav Janulík	ANO 2011	7 381	22,54	6 015	41,11
Rostislav Koštial	KDU-ČSL, ODS, TOP 09	7 300	22,29	—	—
Josef Osička	STAN	4 416	13,48	—	—
Rudolf Kadlec	Nestranici2024.cz	1 819	5,55	—	—
Zdeněk Koudelka	SPD, Tricolour	1 459	4,45	—	—
David Malinkovič	SOCDEM	1 084	3,31	—	—
Stanislav Šprtel	KSČM	1 057	3,22	—	—
Zbyněk Hromek	NOS	121	0,36	—	—
