= 2021 Přísaha leadership election =

- 26 June 2021
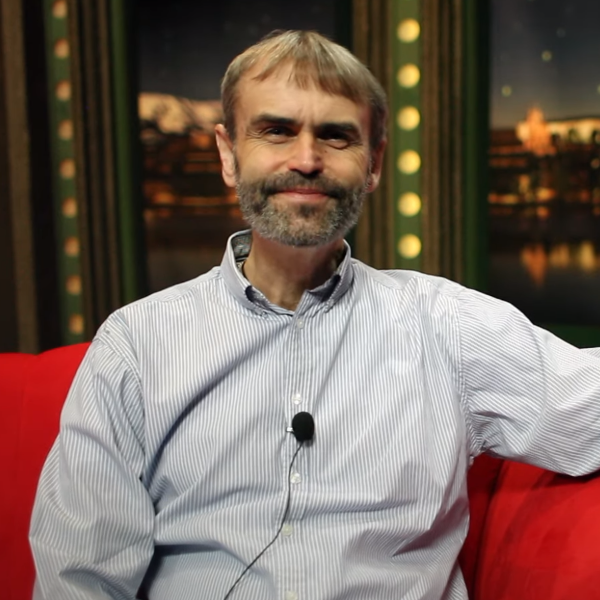
Candidate	Robert Šlachta
Electoral vote	110
Percentage	91.7%
Elected leader of Přísaha
Robert Šlachta

A leadership election for Přísaha was held on 26 June 2021. Robert Šlachta became first leader of the party.

== Background ==
Přísaha was founded by Robert Šlachta in early 2021. Constituent meeting along with leadership election was set for 26 June 2021 but was reportedly delayed due to 2021 South Moravia tornado. The election was still held but without ideological discussion. Šlachta was the only candidate.

== Voting ==
120 delegates voted. 110 delegates cast votes to Šlachta, who was thus elected.
