= Přísaha and Motorists =

Czech populist electoral alliance

Přísaha and Motorists Přísaha a Motoristé
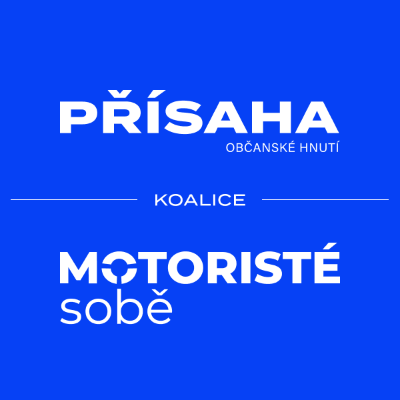
- Leader: Filip Turek
- Founded: 29 January 2024; 2 years ago
- Dissolved: 16 January 2025; 22 months ago
- Ideology: Conservatism; Right-wing populism Euroscepticism
- Political position: Right-wing to far-right
- European Parliament group: Patriots for Europe (2024–2025)

Přísaha and Motorists (Czech: Přísaha a Motoristé, lit. 'Oath and Motorists') was a Czech electoral alliance formed between Přísaha and Motorists for Themselves, a Prague local party, for the 2024 European Parliament election.

== History ==
Přísaha and the Motorists started cooperating after the 2022 Czech municipal elections. In that election, Přísaha won 51 local councillors nationwide, below their expectations. In Pohořelice, the hometown of the Přísaha's leader Robert Šlachta, the party won 41.28% of the vote and 9 out of 21 seats. However, every other party in Pohořelice formed a unity coalition against Přísaha.

Motorists for Themselves had expressed the intention to become part of the Prague governing coalition, but failed to overcome the 5% electoral threshold and did not gain any seats in the Prague City Council. In autumn 2023, the two parties announced their intention to co-operate in the upcoming 2024 Czech Senate election, and the Motorists said they would support Šlachta's candidacy for a seat in the Senate.

Around the same time, Přísaha announced its intention to run in the European election, with the leader of its South Bohemian chapter as its probable lead candidate. Meanwhile, Motorists were in negotiations with Svobodní about a joint list for the elections. However, in January 2024, the two parties signed a memorandum and announced a coalition for the European elections. The alliance announced a planned election budget of around six million CZK.

At the election, Přísaha and the Motorists won 10.26% of the vote and 2 out of 21 seats, significantly exceeding expectations. The alliance's electoral leader Filip Turek gained 152,196 preferential votes, the second most for a single candidate in the Czech Republic. According to experts, Turek gained support from ANO and SPD voters, as well as from among non-voters. The alliance was also more successful in smaller cities, and had the youngest electorate overall. Some experts expressed doubts that the alliance would be able to replicate its success in a parliamentary election.

Přísaha later chose to run alone in the 2024 Czech regional elections, failing to win any seats. However, the coalition did win one seat in the Senate elections taking place at the same time, gained by Přísaha's leader Šlachta.

=== End of the coalition ===
Přísaha expressed an intention to extend the coalition for the 2025 Czech parliamentary election, citing their success in the European Parliament election. However, the Motorists voted overwhelmingly against this at their party congress, preferring to run alone following their surge in the opinion polls. Šlachta said he was "disappointed" and that he had learned the results of the vote from media reports. Motorists' leader Petr Macinka said his party was still open to cooperation, but that this must be in the form of Přísaha's candidates on Motorists' list, not as an equal coalition.

Turek gave up his seat after his election to the Czech parliament in 2025, and was replaced by former Social Democrat minister and Přísaha member Antonín Staněk. In February 2026, Nikola Bartůšek left the Patriots for Europe, but remained a Přísaha member. In April 2026, both Staněk and Bartůšek left Přísaha, leaving the party with no MEPs.

== Neo-Nazism allegations ==
Shortly before the 2024 European parliament election, several media outlets published photos of the election leader Filip Turek performing the Nazi salute while driving, as well as an image of his old race helmet decorated with the logo of the Greek far-right organisation Golden Dawn. It was also found that his past Facebook activity included posts praising Hitler as "golden daddy", and stating that he always pumps 88 litres of petrol into his car because it's a "very round number". He also nicknamed his house the "Adlerhorst". Turek also said he owns several items featuring the Nazi swastika and SS symbols.

While Turek denied being a neo-Nazi, the Czech police opened an investigation into his gestures. He also pulled out of the remaining pre-election debates. After the election, Turek again denied being a neo-Nazi, stating that his old controversial photos and social media posts were the product of his "sharp and brutal humour", and/or mistakes of his youth.

== Member parties ==
Parties	Main ideology	Leader(s)	EP list composition	EP seats won
Přísaha	Right-wing populism	Robert Šlachta	15 / 28	2 / 21 (Note: Filip Turek was elected as Přísaha nominee, but later became Motorists' honorary president.)
Motorists for Themselves	Right-wing populism	Petr Macinka	13 / 28	0 / 21

== Election results ==
=== European Parliament ===
Election	List leader	Votes	%	Seats	+/–	EP Group
2024	Filip Turek	304,623	10.26 (#3)	2 / 21	New	PfE

=== 2024 Senate election ===
Year	Leader	Vote	Vote %	Seats	Place
2024	Robert Šlachta	8,099	1.0	1 / 27	9th
