= Nikola Bartůšek =

Czech politician (born 1985)

Nikola Bartůšek MEP
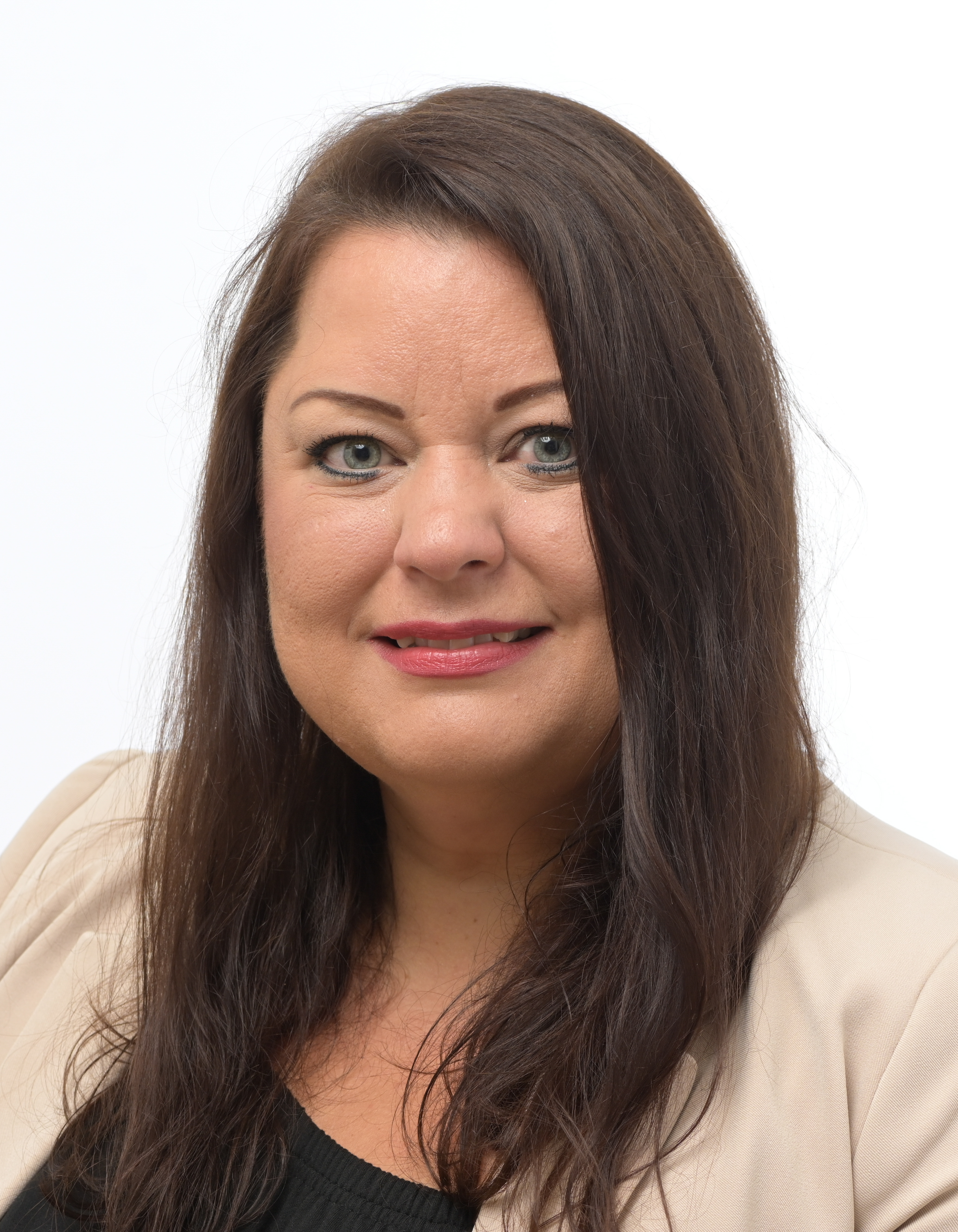
- Official portrait, 2024

Member of the European Parliament for the Czech Republic
- Incumbent
- Assumed office 16 July 2024

Personal details
- Born: 11 May 1985 (age 41) České Budějovice, Czechoslovakia
- Party: Independent (since 2026)
- Other political affiliations: Přísaha (until 2026)
- Children: 1
- Education: Johannes Kepler University Linz; University of Tampere

Nikola Bartůšek (born 11 May 1985) is a Czech politician, who was elected as a member of the European Parliament in 2024 for Přísaha. She was the head of migration and asylum management in Upper Austria during the 2015 European migrant crisis.

== Early life and education ==
Bartůšek was born on 11 May 1985 in České Budějovice, Czechoslovakia. She studied migration sociology at the Johannes Kepler University Linz in Austria, and social policy and political science at the University of Tampere in Finland where she obtained a master's degree in social sciences.

During the 2015 European migrant crisis she focused on analysing issues related to migration, and became head of migration and asylum management in the Austrian state of Upper Austria, which involved collaboration with foreign police forces to deport people who were considered ineligible for asylum.

== Political career ==
Bartůšek joined Přísaha and became the chair of the party's branch in the South Bohemian Region. In the European Parliament elections in June 2024, she ran as the 2nd candidate on the list of the Přísaha and Motorists coalition, composed of Přísaha and the Motorists for Themselves. The coalition won two seats, which was widely attributed to the appeal of the lead candidate, motor-racing driver Filip Turek.

Bartůšek states that her policies are to "return the European Union to its roots", with an emphasis on national-level politics and "sovereignty". In the European Parliament, she joined the right-wing Patriots for Europe grouping and became a member of the Committee on Employment and Social Affairs and the Committee on Civil Liberties, Justice and Home Affairs.

On 9 February 2026, Bartůšek confirmed that she had left Patriots for Europe.

On 24 April 2026, Přísaha announced that Bartůšek and the party's other MEP, Antonín Staněk, had left the party.

On 16 June 2026, Bartůšek joined the European Conservatives and Reformists Group.
