= Gabriela Sedláčková =

Czech politician (born 1985)

Member of the Chamber of Deputies
- Incumbent
- Assumed office 4 October 2025
- Constituency: Olomouc Region

Personal details
- Born: 30 January 1985 (age 41) Olomouc, Czechoslovakia
- Party: Independent (nominated by Motorists for Themselves) (2025–)
- Other party: Conservative Party (2020–2024)

Gabriela Sedláčková (born 30 January 1985) is a Czech politician serving as a member of the Chamber of Deputies for Motorists for Themselves since 2025. From 2020 to 2024, she was a member of the Conservative Party.
