= Antonín Staněk =

Czech politician

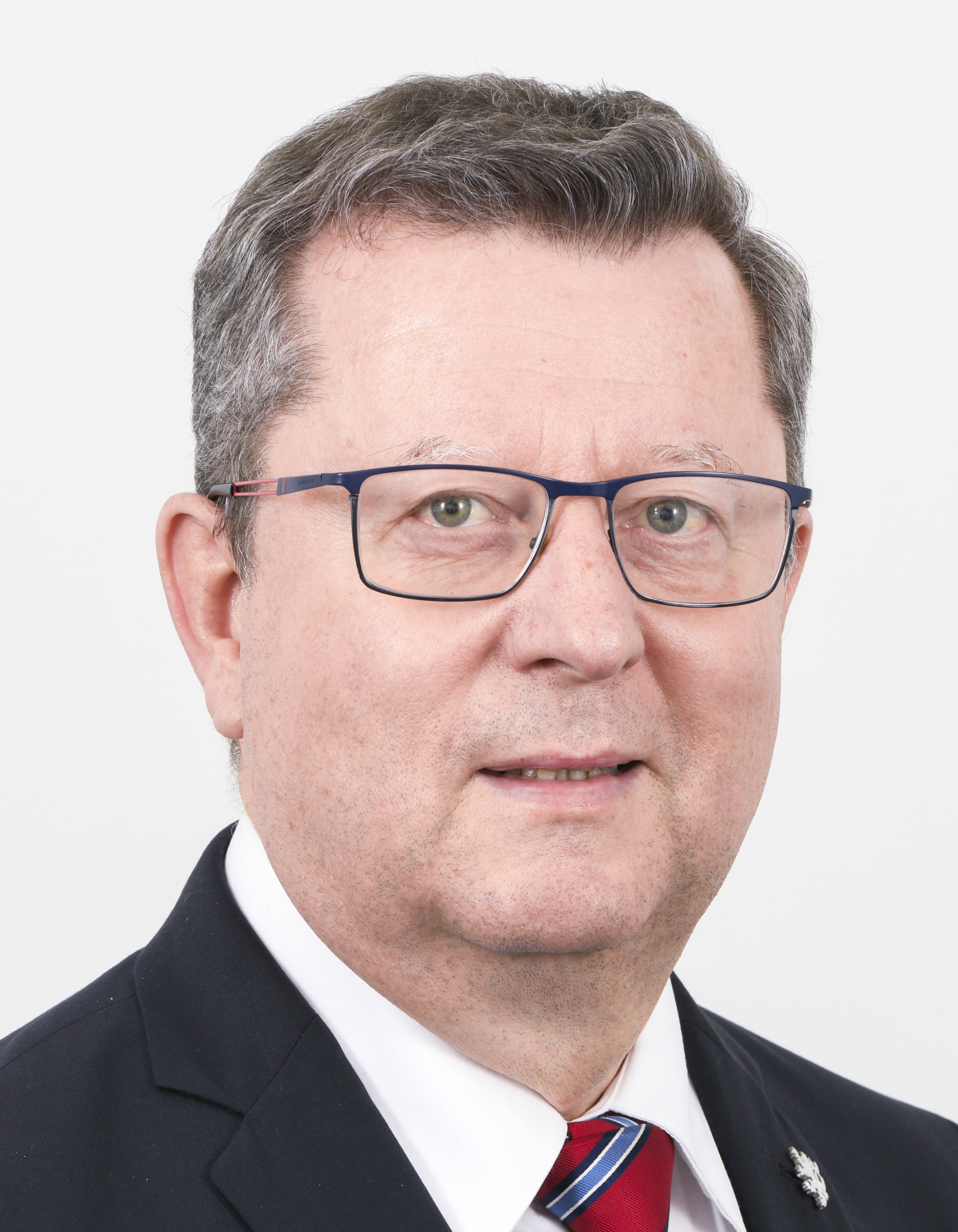

Minister of Culture of the Czech Republic
- In office 27 June 2018 – 31 July 2019
- Preceded by: Ilja Šmíd
- Succeeded by: Lubomír Zaorálek

Member of the Chamber of Deputies of the Czech Republic
- In office 21 October 2017 – 21 October 2021

Member of the European Parliament for the Czech Republic
- Incumbent
- Assumed office 4 October 2025
- Preceded by: Filip Turek

Mayor of Olomouc
- In office 10 November 2014 – 15 November 2018
- Preceded by: Martin Major
- Succeeded by: Miroslav Žbánek

Representative of Olomouc
- In office 16 October 2010 – 24 September 2022

Personal details
- Born: 2 March 1966 (age 60) Olomouc, Czechoslovakia
- Party: Social Democratic Party (2001–2021); Přísaha (until 2026); Motorists for Themselves (since 2026)
- Education: Palacký University Olomouc

Antonín Staněk (born 2 March 1966) is a Czech politician serving as a member of the European Parliament since 2025. He was a member of the Chamber of Deputies of the Czech Republic from 2017 to 2021. Staněk served as Minister of Culture of the Czech Republic in the Second cabinet of Andrej Babiš between June 2018 and July 2019. He served as mayor of Olomouc from 2014 to 2018. For twenty years between 2001 and 2021, Staněk was a member of the Social Democratic Party.

== Early life and education ==
Staněk was born on 2 March 1966. In 2001, he joined the Department of Social Sciences of the Faculty of Education of Palacký University. Staněk also graduated as vice-dean for study matters and head of the Department of Social Sciences. In March 2021, after the complaints of students the management of the Faculty of Education of the UP had Staněk's lecture materials submitted and interrupted cooperation with him by mutual agreement.

A municipal politician, his salary was around 200,000 CZK per month. Although Staněk served as Minister of Culture from 2018 until 2019, he was not interested in culture during his parliamentary mandate.

== Political career ==
=== Chamber of Deputies ===
In the 2006 Czech municipal elections, Staněk ran for Olomouc City Council as a member of ČSSD, but was unsuccessful. He became a city councilor only after the 2010 elections.

In the 2014 Czech municipal elections, he defended his position as a city councilor of Olomouc, leading the ČSSD candidate list. Although the ČSSD finished in second place, it eventually negotiated a coalition with the ODS, KDU-ČSL, and TOP 09, and Staněk was elected mayor of the statutory city of Olomouc on 10 November. After the resignation of Jitka Seitlová, Staněk became a city representative again in July 2020.

Staněk tried to enter Olomouc Regional Assembly as a member of the ČSSD twice, but was unsuccessful in both 2008 and 2012. In the 2017 Czech parliamentary election, he finished first as a ČSSD candidate in the Olomouc Region, thus became a member of parliament with 1,362 votes.

=== Minister of Culture ===
Staněk failed to run for the post as vice-chairman of the ČSSD twice at the party congresses in 2018 and 2019. On 18 May 2018, the president the of ČSSD approved him as a candidate for the post of Minister of Culture of the Czech Republic. On 22 June, prime minister Andrej Babiš chose him for the post of Minister of Culture of the Czech Republic in his newly-formed government. On 27 June, President Miloš Zeman approved his appointment.

=== European Parliament ===
On 24 April 2026, Přísaha announced that both their MEPs Staněk and Nikola Bartůšek left the party.

== Personal life ==
Staněk listens to Metallica and Finnish singer Tarja Turunen. He serves as chairman of the supervisory board of SK Sigma Olomouc.
