= Filip Turek =

Czech politician (born 1985)

Filip Turek MP
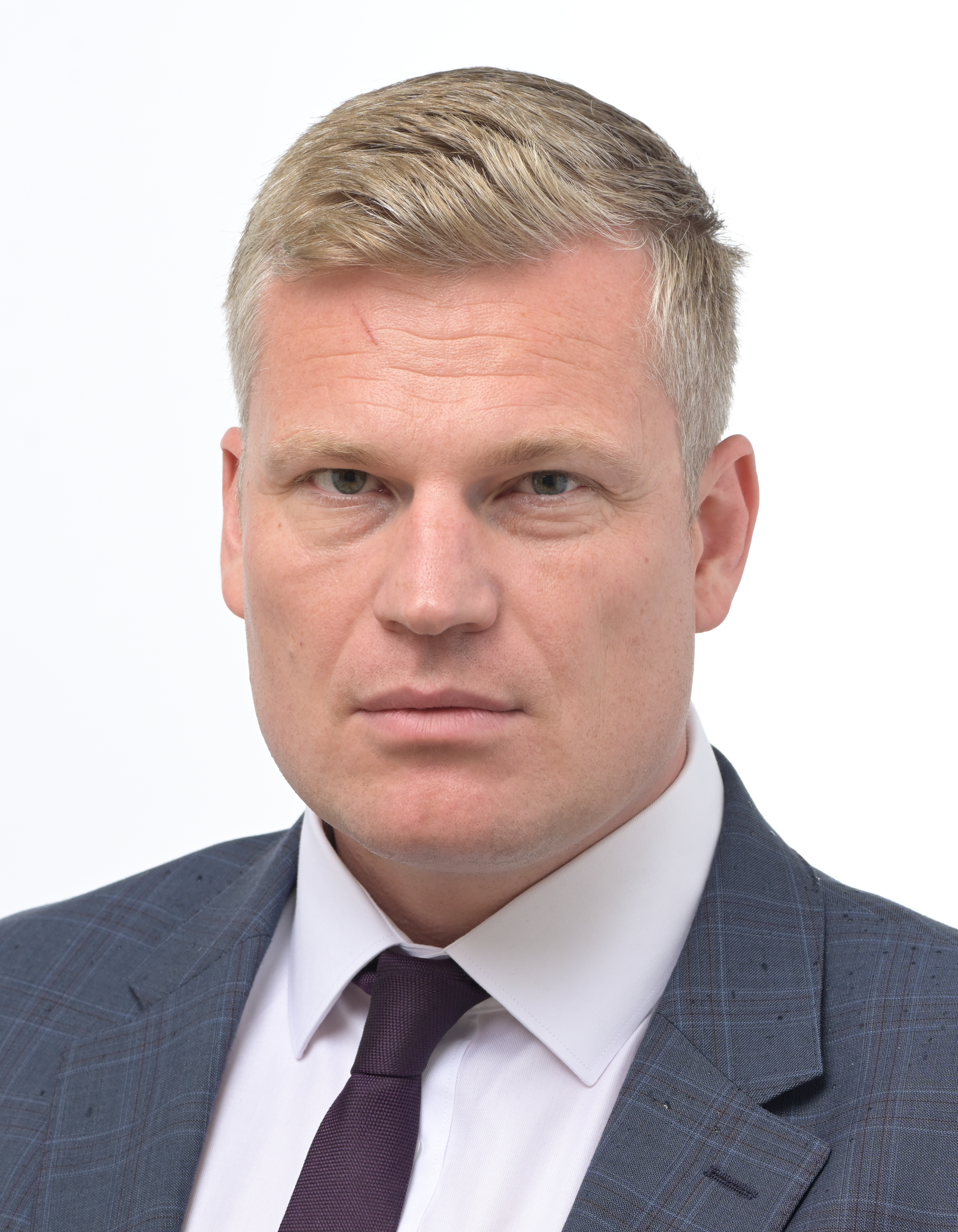
- Official portrait, 2024

Member of the Chamber of Deputies
- Incumbent
- Assumed office 4 October 2025

Member of the European Parliament for the Czech Republic
- In office 16 July 2024 – 3 October 2025
- Succeeded by: Antonín Staněk

Personal details
- Born: 15 October 1985 (age 41) Prague, Czechoslovakia
- Party: Motorists for Themselves
- Website: filipturek.cz

Filip Turek (born 15 October 1985) is a Czech far-right politician, and former racing driver.

He was elected as an MEP in the 2024 European Parliament election as the lead candidate for the Přísaha and Motorists alliance. In the 2025 Czech parliamentary election, his party Motorists for Themselves was elected to parliament with 6.8% of the vote, and Turek became an MP.

== Early life and education ==
Turek was born on 15 October 1985 in Prague. He received his bachelor degree in commercial law from the private, now-defunct College of Applied Law (Vysoká škola aplikovaného práva), and his master's degree from the private University College Prague. Turek has refused to give journalists access to his bachelor thesis, though he has provided pictures of the front page. In his master's thesis, he wrote about the critical views of former Czech president Václav Klaus on American interventionism.

== Early career ==
From 2015 to 2017, Turek was a competitive racing driver, participating in 27 races. The nature of Turek's racing successes has been the subject of debate. Data journalists Kateřina Mahdalová and Michal Škop reported that his wins were in categories where he either raced alone or with one or two opponents, including one amateur and one child, often racing in weaker cars, and Turek usually finished in one of the last or in last place.

In 2015, Turek self-published Paraziti v nás (lit. 'Parasites inside Us'), written by his mother, Eleni Turková, a book about alternative healing methods. During the COVID-19 pandemic, one of his companies, Zapper-Club s.r.o., of which he was one of two executives until February 2022 and the sole partner until August 2023, marketed uncertified "antivirus" home remedies to seniors and others. The Czech Agriculture and Food Inspection Authority issued a warning against the company. However, Turek himself denies any role in these activities.

== Politics ==
From 2022, Turek began commenting on politics on VOX TV's online program Po žních k Turkovi (lit. 'To Turek after the harvest') as well as Xaver Live's Přisně tajné (lit. 'Top Secret'). His positions included support for a minimal state, questioning of liberal values, and opposition to the euro, the European Green Deal, and the proposed ban on the production of cars with internal combustion engines.

In the 2024 European Parliament election, he ran as a non-affiliated candidate for the populist party Přísaha, as the lead candidate for the Přísaha and Motorists alliance. He was elected as an MEP with 152,196 preferential votes, the second-highest vote total of any candidate. Turek was a member of Patriots for Europe and its bureau during his time in the European Parliament. His committee work covered industry, research and energy, consumer protection and the internal market, and environmental policy.

On 7 December 2024, Motorists for Themselves appointed Turek its honorary president.

In February 2025, Turek was reported to have met with representatives of the Iranian government for undisclosed reasons.

On 30 May, Turek announced that he would lead Motorists for Themselves in the Central Bohemian Region in the 2025 Czech parliamentary election. He was elected to the Chamber of Deputies as an MP, with 20,232 preferential votes.

On 12 November 2025, Turek was elected deputy chair of the Chamber of Deputies' Foreign Affairs Committee.

On 7 January 2026, Czech President Petr Pavel refused to appoint Turek as environment minister. In a letter to Prime Minister Andrej Babiš, Pavel said he must protect fundamental constitutional values, including the rejection of totalitarian ideologies, arguing that Turek's past statements and conduct cast doubt on his loyalty to those values, such as remarks that praised or downplayed Nazi Germany, and that Turek had repeatedly shown a lack of respect for the Czech legal order. On 12 January, Turek was appointed government commissioner for climate policy.

Turek represented the Czech government at meetings of the Environment Council in March and June 2026.

As government commissioner, Turek opposed large-scale construction of wind farms and sought to restrict the proposed acceleration of renewable energy projects. Babiš and Karel Havlíček opposed the amendment, warning that it may jeopardise the Czech Republic's access to European funds. Turek then withdrew it.

On 3 July, Turek resigned as vice-chair of the Committee on European Affairs and was replaced by Zuzana Majerová.

== Controversies ==
=== Allegations of violence ===
Turek was investigated by the police in 2017 for threatening an employee of the Saudi Arabian embassy in Prague by placing a drawing of a gallows under the windscreen wiper of the employee's car and a bullet casing on the roof. He was recorded on camera during the act and confessed to the police. He defended his actions by stating that he was defending his girlfriend. The police eventually classified the act as a misdemeanor, and Turek had to pay a penalty fine.

In June 2025, the website Page Not Found reported that Turek had been accused by his ex-girlfriend in a criminal complaint of domestic violence, threatening with a firearm, and rape. Turek denied the accusations. In May 2026, the police dismissed the case, due to the statute of limitations having expired. Turek's ex-girlfriend appealed the decision.

=== Allegations of Nazi sympathies ===
During the 2024 European election campaign, several old photos of Turek were circulated online, including one where he wore a golden helmet with a symbol used by the former Greek neo-Nazi party Golden Dawn, one where he appeared to give a Nazi salute from a car, and one featuring a candlestick with a swastika. In a discussion on CNN Prima News, Turek stated that he was a collector and that he also had a knife used by SS soldiers, but he denied being a Nazi sympathizer. The Czech police opened an investigation into his gestures, which was concluded in November 2024 due to the statute-barred case.

Journalists have also uncovered further old photos of Turek, in which he was wearing a white racing helmet with a symbol used by the aerial-warfare branch of the Wehrmacht Luftwaffe and a fighter wing of the Luftwaffe called Jagdgeschwader 27. Screenshots of his Facebook comments between 2013 and 2018 have been published, in which he referred to Adolf Hitler as a "golden daddy" and wrote that he always fills up with 88 litres of fuel—a veiled reference to the Nazi salute.

=== Dangerous driving incidents ===
On 17 April 2025, Turek posted a photo on Instagram showing his car's speedometer at over 200 km/h, claiming he was driving in Germany. Online users and later journalists identified the location as the D5 motorway in the Plzeň Region, where the speed limit is 130 km/h. The post inspired his followers to share similar speeding posts, some of which Turek reposted. Turek was criticized by former minister of finance Miroslav Kalousek, former minister of science and research Marek Ženíšek, MEP Tomáš Zdechovský, and MEP Danuše Nerudová for promoting irresponsible and dangerous driving, as Turek refused to apologize for his behavior. Following the criticism, Turek called on his followers to stop imitating his driving and stopped sharing their speeding posts. During a debate on CNN Prima News, he defended himself, saying that he wanted to draw attention to a bad law with his action and that he had nothing to apologize for, while urging the public to drive carefully. In May, Turek confirmed in a text message to the editors of Novinky.cz that he had not been driving in Germany but in the Czech Republic. The Czech police opened an investigation into his post and eventually classified the act as a misdemeanor, handing the case to the Rokycany municipal office in June for speeding and using a cell phone while driving. Officials concluded the case in August, as Turek refused to testify, and they were unable to prove he had been driving on the highway. After the case was concluded, Turek apologized for inspiring his followers to drive irresponsibly and said he had donated CZK 50,000 to a fund for accident victims. The Plzeň customs directorate issued Turek with a fine of CZK 8,000 for driving on the highway without a motorway vignette.

On 13 July, Turek's car collided with an ambulance transporting biological material near I. P. Pavlova in Prague, which flipped onto its roof. An emergency service spokesperson said that the driver suffered multiple injuries, including a moderate head wound. According to a police spokesperson, a hospital vehicle was passing through with its emergency lights on and collided with another vehicle. Turek said he was driving through the intersection on a green light, while the ambulance drove through a red light, and he was unable to prevent the accident. CCTV footage showed that Turek had entered the intersection through the turning lane to overtake a line of cars and continued straight while signalling right, as a hospital vehicle was passing through the intersection with its emergency lights and siren active. PM Babiš stated that if the situation happened as it appeared, Turek should resign as the government commissioner for climate policy. First Deputy President of the Chamber of Deputies Patrik Nacher and Government Commissioner for Human Rights Taťána Malá criticized Turek's driving style, while SPD MP Miroslav Ševčík blamed traffic signs. President of the Chamber of Deputies Tomio Okamura said during a debate on CNN Prima News that he would wait for the results of the police investigation, and if Turek was founded guilty, he would be in favor of criminal prosecution. Opposition leaders called on Turek to resign as a member of parliament and as government commissioner. Turek wrote in an Instagram post that he was placing his role as a commissioner at the government's disposal until the police determine responsibility for the accident and that he would resign from the position if he was found to have been at fault. The chair of Motorists, Macinka, said on XTV that Turek behaved like an adult and that he would never give up on him. On 15 July, Turek stated in a comment on Facebook that he had not used the turning lane, had saved the hospital vehicle driver's life by turning right, and that the driver was at home with just a scraped elbow. Traffic experts disputed Turek's claim that his maneuver had saved the other driver's life. On the same day, a police spokesperson stated that the police had checked the traffic signs immediately after the accident and that they were in accordance with the traffic engineering decision. On 5 August, the police opened a criminal investigation on suspicion of bodily harm caused by negligence. Speaking on TN.cz, Turek said he had recorded a phone call with the injured driver the day after the accident, repeating his claim that the driver had suffered only a scraped elbow. He also argued that the accident was the fault of the hospital driver, as he was driving in the opposite direction and on the tram tracks, and that the traffic signs were not in accordance with regulations. On 1 October, the police concluded the investigation, classifying the act as a misdemeanor and handing the case to the Prague 2 municipal office. The investigation and opinions from medical experts indicated that both drivers had committed traffic violations. Supervising state prosecutor Kamil Švec stated that Turek had fulfilled almost all the elements of the crime of negligent bodily harm but had not been charged because the ambulance driver's injuries were not serious enough.

=== Social media posts ===
In October 2025, the newspaper Deník N published an article with an archive of Facebook posts and comments by Turek, which he had later deleted, in which he repeatedly made openly racist, sexist, or homophobic statements, as well as numerous allusions to Hitler and Mussolini. Some of his racist remarks targeted former American president Barack Obama and Meghan, Duchess of Sussex. Turek called for his opponents (including politicians, students, and businessman Petr Kellner) to be sent to gas chambers, and he threatened them with physical assault. Turek denied authorship of the posts and called the article a deliberate attempt to discredit him. The Czech police opened an investigation into his deleted posts. The Czech anti-racist nonprofit ROMEA published an online petition, calling on the chair of ANO, Andrej Babiš, not to nominate Turek to the job of foreign minister, and on Czech President Petr Pavel to not appoint him. The petition was signed by more than 8,000 people. The chair of Motorists, Petr Macinka, announced that the party would file a criminal complaint against Deník N and the authors of the article. On 14 October 2025, the Instagram account Štít demokracie published 42 pages of deleted posts from Turek's Facebook, with timestamps and URLs, which had been sent to them anonymously. The screenshots were taken in June 2024. Turek's former friend Vojtěch Dobeš, a motoring journalist, later claimed responsibility for the screenshots. Dobeš confirmed the authenticity of Turek's deleted posts to the police and handed them other, as-yet unpublished, posts.

The police investigated 85 posts from 2010 to 2017 and found eight of them to be of a criminal nature. Turek was found to have committed the misdemeanor of incitement against a group of persons or to the restriction of their rights and freedoms, as well as the offence of approving of a criminal act, in his post about the burning of a young Roma girl by neo-Nazis. The police confirmed Turek's authorship of the posts based on IP address data, Dobeš' testimony, and Turek's consistent long-term pattern of communication. They also investigated a video from 2015, which involved Turek standing next to the Motorists' sponsor Richard Chlad and raising his right hand. According to detectives from the Prague police's Extremism and Terrorism Department, this constituted a Nazi salute. Turek's former assistant in the European parliament, Motorists MP Gabriela Sedláčková, also gave testimony to the police. She stated that she had advised Turek to review his social media accounts for potentially controversial content prior to entering politics and was subsequently entrusted by him to do so. She testified that she had neither found nor deleted the posts cited by Deník N and said that if she had found the post about the young Roma girl, she would have questioned Turek about his motive before removing it. Sedláčková also confirmed seeing references to the Nazi leader on Turek's Facebook account, which she viewed as merely "making fun of Hitler".

On 22 July 2026, the police dismissed the case, as the posts in question were over five years old. In response, Turek stated that he was not surprised, as he had done nothing wrong. Detectives simultaneously investigated the Motorists' criminal complaint against Deník N for alleged defamation and infringement of Turek's rights. The police refuted this claim, as Turek had engaged in the conduct described. They also found the Motorists' complaint and Turek's testimony to be a tactical maneuver, considering it proven that Turek had engaged in criminal activity and that he and the Motorists merely sought to hinder the investigation through their statements. The police also dismissed this case, as no evidence of a criminal offence was established.

=== Inflammatory language ===
On 19 April 2026, the newspaper Blesk reported Turek's comments during an XTV online TV celebration event, in which he stated that "progressive, left-wing, sometimes green, and other kinds of parasites" were being removed in the four government ministries controlled by the Motorists. He further referred to them as "vermin" and "rabble". Czech-Moravian Confederation of Trade Unions leader Josef Středula called on Turek to apologise, stating that "such language has no place in politics". STAN leader Vít Rakušan and former environment minister Petr Hladík warned that dehumanizing rhetoric echoes language used by the Nazis. PM Babiš, finance minister Alena Schillerová, and interior minister Lubomír Metnar stated that Turek's statements were unacceptable, whereas AUTO leader Macinka defended Turek and said he had been referring to dubious activists who pose as experts. On 25 April, during a debate on TV Nova, Turek apologized for his statement about parasites but denied that he had been talking about state employees. He also said he had been referring to activists and that his words had been misinterpreted. Středula called his apology insufficient.

On 24 April, Turek used his Facebook account to accuse the nonprofit environmental organization Hnutí DUHA of preventing the construction of the Nové Heřminovy dam, and as a result, causing the deaths of several people. On 5 May, the group called on Turek to publicly apologise and sent a pre-trial notice for defamation. On 24 June, the group filed a lawsuit, as Turek had not apologised. On 14 September, the Municipal Court in Prague ordered Turek to apologise to Hnutí DUHA and to post his apology on Facebook for at least one week. The court issued a default judgment after Turek did not respond to the lawsuit within the required time. The verdict was not final. On 2 October, Turek sent a written apology to Hnutí DUHA, acknowledging that the statements were not based on fact and constituted an unjustified infringement of the organisation's reputation. On 6 October, Turek posted a video with an apology to Hnutí DUHA on Facebook but added that the dam would be built, co-workers associated with the movement were being fired from the environment ministry, the cabinet had cut CZK 700 million from the organization's funding for environmental education, and the scale of the wind farms had been reduced by 90%. The movement called this insufficient, as Turek did not publish the written apology on Facebook, and the video he posted did not fulfil the court ruling. On 12 October, the movement announced its intention to file a motion to enforce the court-imposed obligation. Turek wrote in response that he had fulfilled his obligation and considered the case closed.

On 14 September, the Municipal Court in Prague ordered Turek to apologise to Seznam.cz, publish his apology within three days, and pay the costs associated with the lawsuit. Turek stated in April on the channel Xaver Live that Seznam.cz employees were looking at users' emails and that the Seznam.cz email service was not secure. He also continued to spread these statements on social media. In June, the court called on Turek to respond to the lawsuit, but he failed to do so within the deadline. According to the court, his silence constituted an acknowledgement of Seznam's claim for an apology, and that his statements were false and unsubstantiated. On 4 October, Turek posted an apology to Seznam on Facebook, but in the same post, he stated that Seznam would lose state funding for media campaigns. The company called this insufficient, as they had not received a written apology, and the Facebook post did not fulfil the court ruling.

== Personal life ==
Turek is a collector of classic cars, especially the British brands Jaguar, Aston Martin, Rolls-Royce, and Bentley. Since 2006, he has been the chairman of the Czech Jaguar fan club, which he founded. In 2023, the club had only three members. He also collects Nazi memorabilia.

In 2024, Turek published the autobiography Hranatá legenda Filip Turek (lit. 'the square legend Filip Turek').
