= Matěj Gregor =

Czech politician (born 2002)

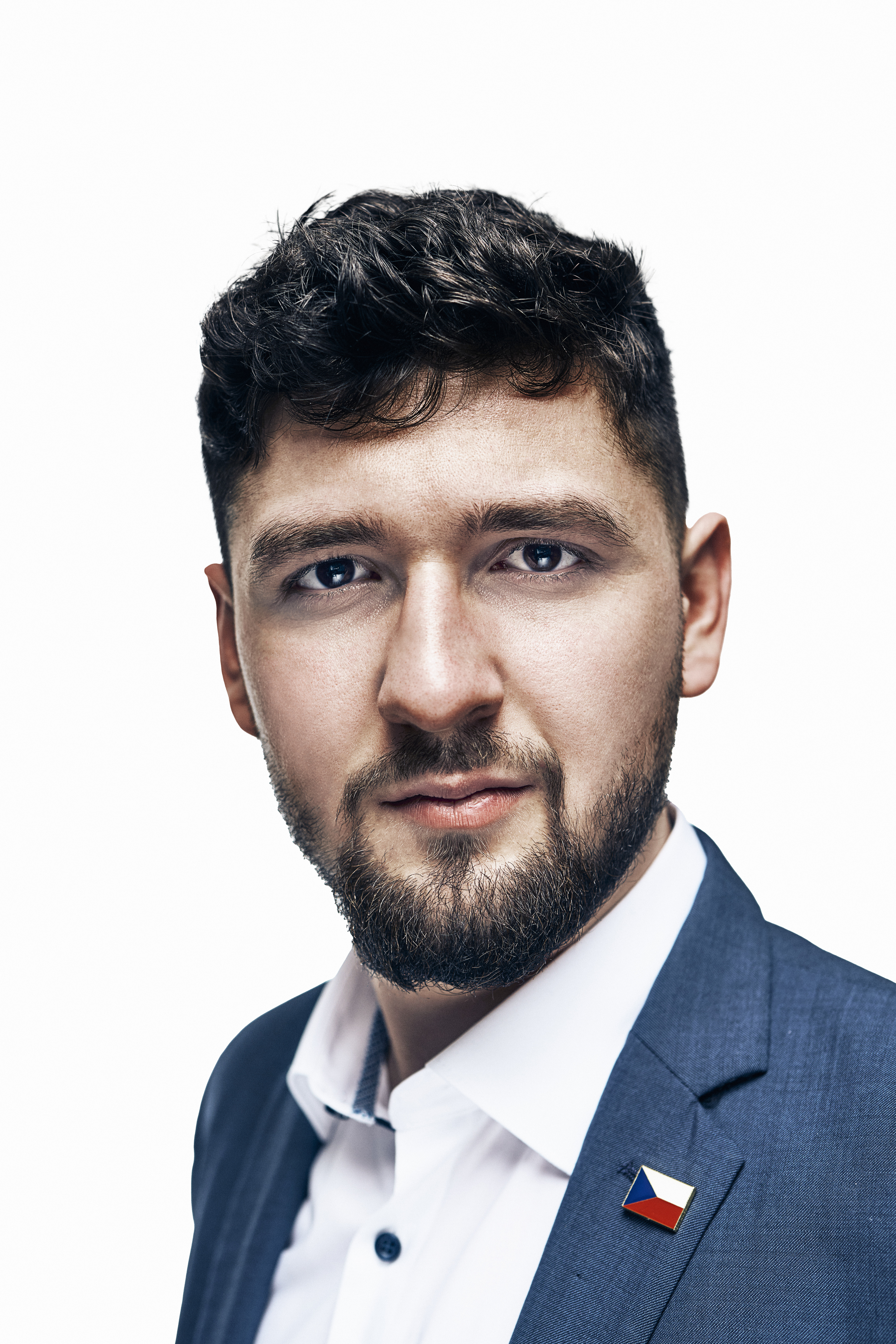
- Gregor in 2024

Member of the Chamber of Deputies
- Incumbent
- Assumed office 4 October 2025
- Constituency: Moravian-Silesian Region

Personal details
- Born: 12 April 2002 (age 24) Ostrava, Czech Republic
- Party: Svobodní (2021–2024); Motorists for Themselves (2024–)

Matěj Gregor (born 12 April 2002) is a Czech politician serving as a member of the Chamber of Deputies since 2025. He has served as leader of the youth wing of Motorists for Themselves since 2024.

In July 2020, Gregor founded association Odchod (lit. 'Departure') in order to educate the public on Eurosceptic topics and support a referendum to leave the European Union. The association's residence, activities and funding remain unclear.

Before joining Motorists for Themselves, Gregor was a member of Svobodní. During this time, he was among the speakers at demonstrations against the Fiala government organized by Ladislav Vrabel and Jindřich Rajchl.

In the 2025 Czech parliamentary election, Gregor was elected to the Chamber of Deputies as an MP, with 8,340 preferential votes.
