= Klausism =

Political positions of Václav Klaus

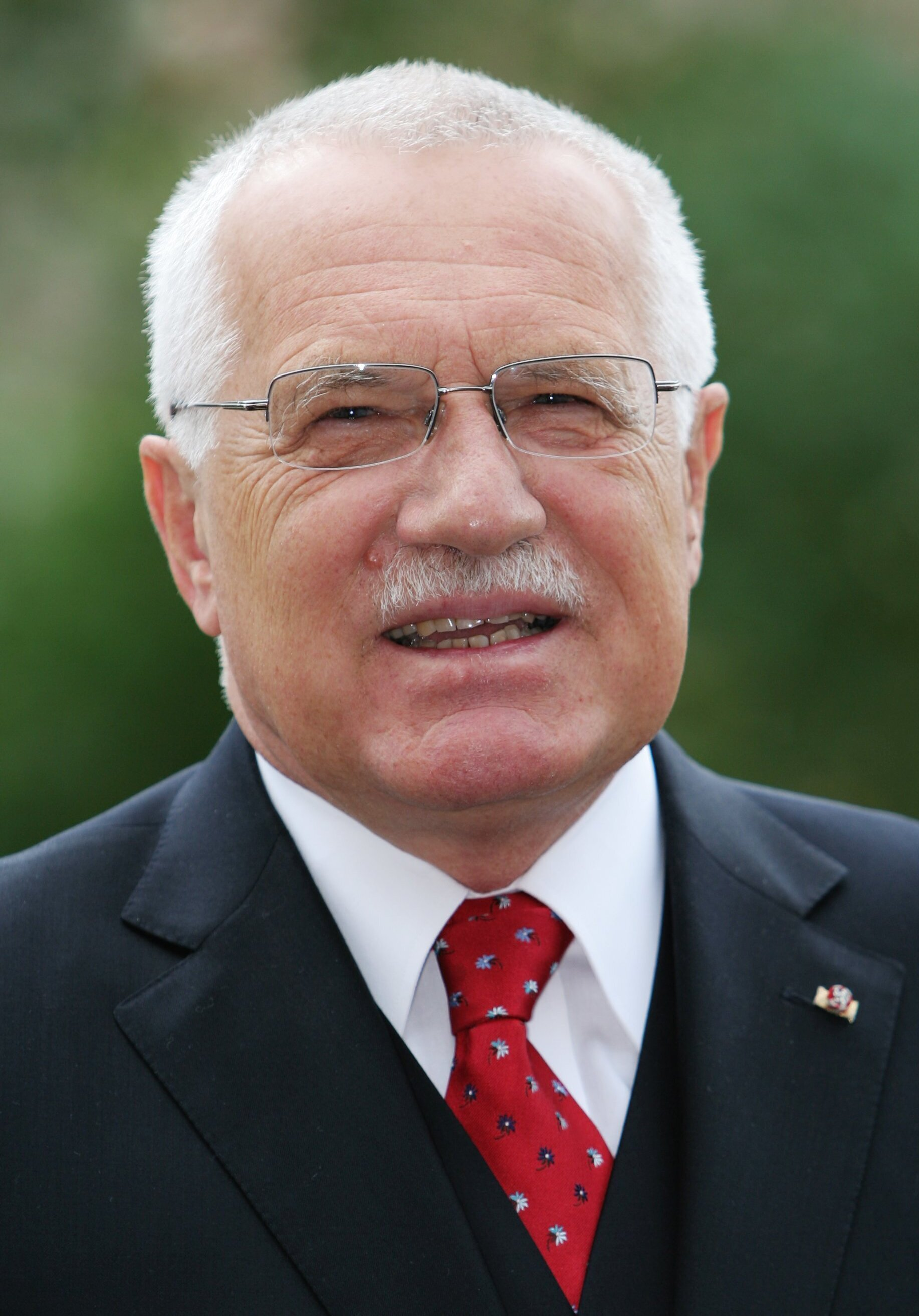
Václav Klaus in 2007 as the president of the Czech Republic

In Czech politics, Klausism refers to the political positions of Václav Klaus, former prime minister and president of the Czech Republic. It was first used by Mirek Topolánek, who designated Klausism as the ideology of the Civic Democratic Party (ODS). This term was also used by former Prague mayor Jan Kasl. Klaus himself does not take issue with the term. The current usage of the term "Klausism" has become distanced from Klaus himself, leading to the phrase "Klausism without Klaus". The term "Klausism" is also frequently used as a label for the neologisms invented by Klaus. Klaus himself used the term "Mental Scheme of ODS", which he allegedly invented by chance. This term was also used by Jan Kasl.

== Political positions ==
Klaus is known for his Euroscepticism, climate change denial, homophobia, and anti-immigration, and support of free-market capitalism. Klaus's stances are often described as liberal conservative combined with national liberalism and Czech nationalism. Jan Pauer described Klaus's political ideology as a combination of the monetarism of Milton Friedman, Thatcherite neoliberalism, Czech national conservatism, and leadership pragmatism. Klaus described himself as liberal, conservative, and pragmatic. In domestic politics, Klaus's positions adhered to the legacy of the austerity policies established by Czechoslovakia's first Minister of Finance, Alois Rašín.

Bohumil Doležal believes that Klausism is about "fighting against isms", including environmentalism, pro-Europeanism, NGOism, or "homosexualism" (a phrase itself coined by Klaus). It is opposition to perceived trends in Western politics. According to Doležal, Klausism is a fight for "realistic policies that solve problems and do not serve dogmatic ideologies". Doležal stated that Klausism itself became one of these Isms. In 2011, Ekonom Magazine likened Klausism to Gaullism, asserting that the two were very similar. Both ideologies support the strong position of the president, but in the case of Klaus it is informal and balancing at the edge of the Czech constitution.

== Klausism without Klaus ==
Klausism without Klaus was a term coined by Mirek Topolánek following conflicts between Václav Klaus and ODS. Bohumil Doležal likened it to "Socialism with a human face". It is often characterised as support for Klaus's ideas but not Klaus himself. Topolánek wanted to retain the positive elements of Klaus' legacy and leave out the negatives. Klausism without Klaus was represented by Petr Nečas, Miroslava Němcová, and Tomáš Chalupa. Klausism without Klaus supports economic liberalism, political responsibility, a small state, opposition to other ideologies, and the "rule of common sense".

== Poděbrady articles ==
The term "Mental scheme of ODS" was formulated into the Poděbrady Articles in 1998, proclaiming the four principles that ODS supports, including protection of privacy, a small state, a future without debts, and solidarity of responsibilities.

== Parties linked with Klausism ==
- Civic Democratic Party (ODS) – Klaus is the founder of ODS. Former leader of ODS Mirek Topolánek is the first person to use the term.
- Tricolour Citizens' Movement (Tricolour; Czech: Trikolóra) – Klaus' son (who was expelled from ODS in 2018) was the founder of the Tricolour and Klaus was the movement's chief foreign policy adviser.
- Head Up – Electoral Bloc – party of Jana Bobošíková
- Freeholder Party of the Czech Republic (SsČR) – the party is close to Klaus's views.
- Independence Party of the Czech Republic (SNČR) – party founded by the hard Eurosceptic Klausist wing of the Party of Free Citizens.
- Party of Free Citizens (Svobodní) – the party is supportive of many Klaus's views.
- Civic Conservative Party (OKS) – the party was described by sociologist Pavel Šplíchal as a dead-end branch of Klausism.
- Realists – the party received support from Vaclav Klaus in 2016.
- Libertas – their party leader called Klaus their idol.
- Independent Democrats (NEZ/DEM) – the party shared their leader Vladimír Železný with Libertas.
- Independents (NEZ) – both Železný and Bobošíková were involved in the party during the 2004 EP election.
- Motorists for Themselves (AUTO), said to be backed by Klaus
- Party of Common Sense (Rozumní) – the party is supportive of Klaus's views and ran with Czech Sovereignty in 2010.
- National Democracy (ND) – their leader is said to be close to Klaus.
- Alliance for the Future (APB) – the party described themselves to be close to Klaus' position with the exception of the European Union and the euro.

== Neologisms ==
The term Klausism is also used for neologisms coined by Václav Klaus. Klaus is noted for his use of language and often invents new words to describe things he opposes. For example, Klaus invented the word "Havlism", which subsequently entered wider use. Klaus also expressed opposition to "homosexualism". Other widely used Klausisms are Opposition Agreement or Sarajevo assassination.

== Criticism ==
Klausism has many critics. Jiří Pehe called Klausism deviant and its own worst enemy, noting Klausism's opposition to modern isms, a category to which Pehe believes it belongs. Pehe believes that Klausism is not what Klaus says but what he did when he was in power. He considers Klaus to be very politically flexible and ignorant of other opinions. Pehe suggested that Klausism would be doom for ODS. The Czech Green Party leader Ondřej Liška described Klausism as dangerous for democracy. He called Klausism an "ideology of arbitrariness that threatens democracy", comparing it to Communism due to its lack of principles.

== See also ==
- Orbanism
