= TN.cz =

Logo of TN.cz (current)

TN.cz (TN, TN.Nova.cz) is a Czech internet news portal. It is operated by TV Nova and is closely linked with its TV News programs. Emphasis is on video and video news, and from spring 2021, the website also features a live continuous broadcast of TN LIVE.

== About ==
TN.cz is one of the most read news portals on the Czech Internet. In February 2022, it was visited by 3,480,942 real users. In addition to domestic and foreign news, it also covers economic and consumer topics and interesting facts from the world of celebrities. It also offers Sport and Auto sections.

The editorial office, which has been headed by Vladimír Rosol since 2014, is linked to the editorial office of Televizní noviny, the most watched news program in the country, and they cooperate closely in terms of content. An important component of the content is live streams or videos, which are quickly published on the web by an extensive network of reporters in all regions.

== History ==
The TN.cz portal has been operating since May 2008, its launch was preceded by an extensive advertising campaign. In the Czech environment, it was the first website linked to television news. The first editor-in-chief was Zdeněk Šámal who later became news director of Czech Television.

After Šámal's departure, Hanuš Hanslík, Jiří Sládek and Václav Kozák took turns in managing TN.cz. From 2012 to 2014, the website was managed by Lubor Černohlávek. Kamil Houska is the current director of news and journalism at TV Nova.

The website has undergone several redesigns during its existence. The last time was in September 2021, when the graphic form was united with the Television News broadcast from the new studio.
