= Václav Klaus Institute =

Czech think tank

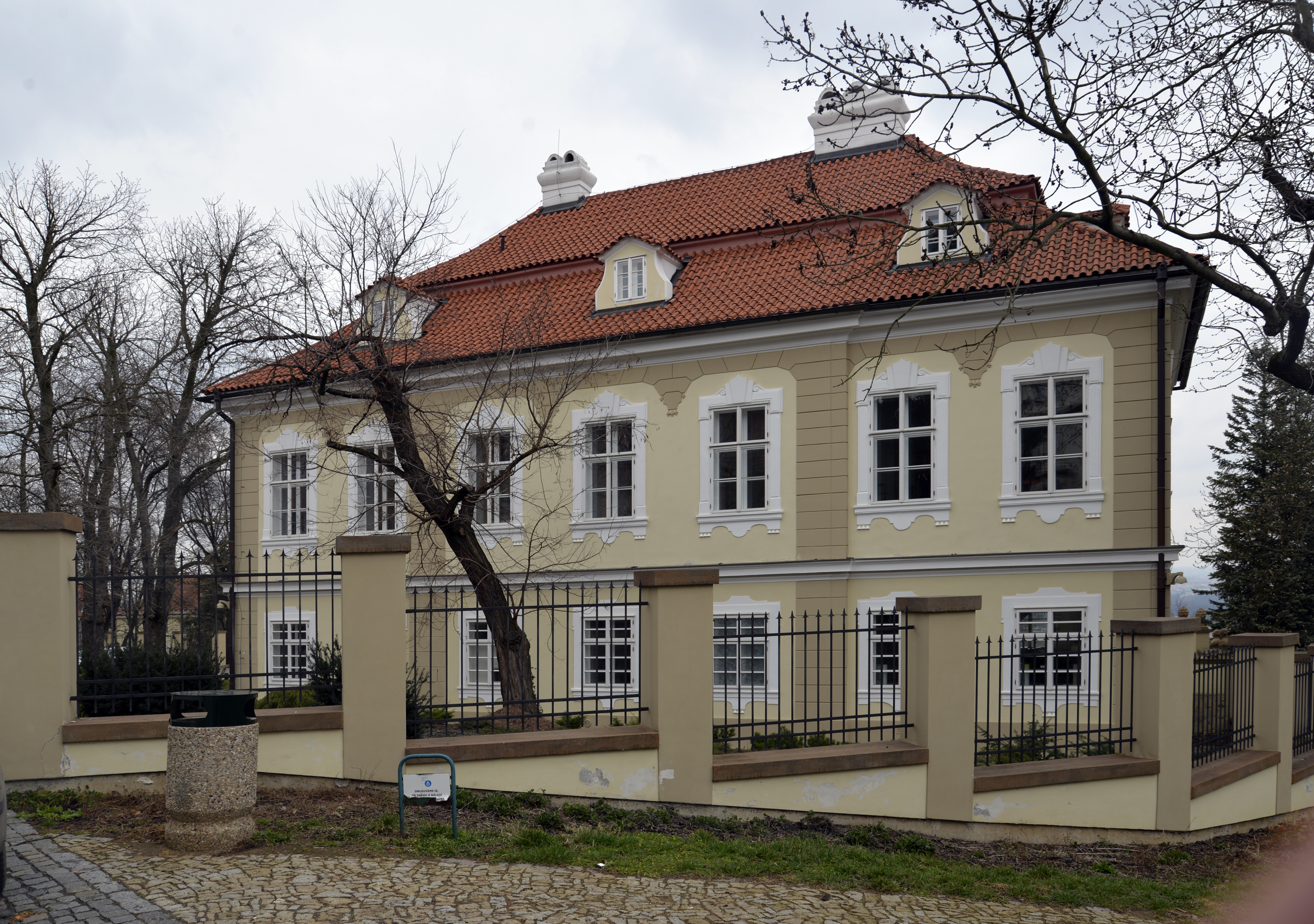
Václav Klaus Institute

Václav Klaus Institute (Czech: Institut Václava Klause) is a think tank based in the Czech Republic. The institute was established by Václav Klaus when his term as President of the Czech Republic ended and was inspired by the libraries of former American presidents. Other people involved with the institute are Jiří Weigl and Václav Klaus's sons. The institute was originally set up to serve as the Václav Klaus Library. Initially it was financially supported by Petr Kellner, nowadays its financially supported by businessman Pavel Tykač.

The institute is closely associated with many prominent politicians of the Civic Democratic Party, including Jan Skopeček and Václav Klaus Jr. The institute itself is critical to the former Civic Democratic leader Petr Fiala.

== Foundation ==
The institute was established in March 2012, one year before the end of Klaus's second term as president. Jiří Weigl said that the institute was set up so that Klaus could join when it was fully functional.

== See also ==
- Klausism
- Center for Civil Liberties
