= Independence Party of the Czech Republic =

Political party

Independence Party of the Czech Republic Strana nezávislosti České republiky
- Leader: Richard Hartmann
- Founded: 4 April 2017
- Dissolved: 14 June 2022
- Split from: Party of Free Citizens
- Succeeded by: Motorists for Themselves
- Headquarters: Thunovská 183/18, Prague
- Think tank: Independence Center of the Czech Republic
- Ideology: Hard Euroscepticism
- Political position: Right-wing to far-right

Website
- https://www.strananezavislosti.cz/

Party logo, 2017-2018

The Independence Party of the Czech Republic (Czech: Strana nezávislosti České republiky, SNČR) previously called Referendum on the European Union (Czech: Referendum o evropské unii) was a Czech Eurosceptic political party founded by František Matějka, a former member of the Party of Free Citizens. Matějka resigned as leader on May 22, 2020.

== Election results ==
=== European Parliament ===
Year	# of total votes	Vote %	Seats
2019	9,676	0.40 ▲	0
