= Motorists for Themselves =

Czech political party founded in 2022

Motorists for Themselves Motoristé sobě
- Abbreviation: AUTO
- Leader: Petr Macinka
- Deputy Leaders: Renáta Maršíková; Jiří Barták
- Honorary President: Filip Turek
- Founded: 4 April 2017
- Preceded by: Independence Party of the Czech Republic
- Youth wing: Motor Generation
- Membership (2024): 1,415
- Ideology: Right-wing populism; National conservatism; Anti-environmentalism; Euroscepticism; Klausism
- Political position: Right-wing to far-right
- National affiliation: Přísaha and Motorists (2024–2025)
- European affiliation: Patriots.eu
- European Parliament group: Patriots for Europe
- Colors: Light blue
- Chamber of Deputies: 6 / 200
- Senate: 0 / 81
- European Parliament: 0 / 21
- Prague City Assembly: 0 / 65

Website
- motoristesobe.cz

Motorists for Themselves (Czech: Motoristé sobě, AUTO) is a right-wing populist political party in the Czech Republic seeking to represent motorists' interests by primarily focusing on the issues of car ownership, opposition to combustion engine phase-out across the European Union, and anti-environmentalism.

Initially formed as a party aimed at declaring a nationwide referendum on the membership of the Czech Republic in the European Union, it was transformed under Petr Macinka, a spokesperson of the Václav Klaus Institute, for the 2022 Prague municipal election. The party gained one MEP in the 2024 European Parliament election, and then finished sixth in the 2025 Czech parliamentary election, passing the threshold to enter parliament.

== Ideology and positions ==
The party opposes green politics, social liberalism, and progressivism and wants to abolish all bicycle lanes. It has stated its support for "cars, coal and the Czech crown". Later, the party also proclaimed its opposition to the European Union, adoption of the Euro and the European Green Deal, while voicing its support for a free market, coal and a nuclear-based energy strategy.

== History ==
=== 2022 Prague municipal election ===
The party ran in the 2022 Czech municipal elections in Prague, claiming opposition to parties such as the Pirates and Prague Together. Motorists promised making the Prague Metro free of charge, greatly reducing the number of bike lanes and reducing the funding of culture, investing the funds into transport infrastructure instead. Macinka accused the Pirate-led coalition in the city of bullying of drivers and called them "green fanatics".

The Motorists received 54,020 votes, 2.29% of the total, (Note: In Czech municipal elections, each voter has a number of votes corresponding to the number of seats in that particular municipal council, which can be distributed freely across candidates of all political parties.) thus missing the 5% electoral threshold required to win seats in the Prague City Assembly.

=== Filip Turek controversy ===
Filip Turek, who led the party's list in the 2024 European Parliament election and was later appointed honorary president of Motorists for Themselves, wore a golden helmet with the symbol used by the former Greek far-right neo-Nazi party Golden Dawn, one where he appeared to give a Nazi salute from a car and one featuring a candlestick with a swastika. In a discussion on CNN Prima News, Turek stated that he was a collector and also had a knife used by SS soldiers, but denied that he was a Nazi sympathizer. Czech police opened an investigation into his Nazi salute gestures, which was ended in November 2024 due to the statute of limitations.

In 2017, Turek threatened an employee of the Saudi Arabian Embassy in Prague. In the shared garages, he placed a picture of a gallows behind the windshield wiper of the employee's car, and a large hunting cartridge was found on the roof of the car. According to Turek, he wanted to protect his girlfriend, after someone from a similar car had previously shouted something unintelligible at her. Czech police closed the investigation as a minor offense.

In October 2025, an archive of later-deleted Facebook posts and comments by Turek was published, in which he repeatedly made openly racist, sexist, or homophobic statements, as well as numerous allusions to Hitler and Benito Mussolini. Some of his racist remarks targeted former American president Barack Obama and Meghan, Duchess of Sussex. In his posts, he expressed the wish to send his opponents (including politicians, students, and Petr Kellner) to gas chambers, threatened them with physical violence, and described them using vulgar terms. Macinka expressed his full support for Turek, who denied authorship of the posts and described the case as a deliberate attempt to discredit him. Macinka announced that the party would file a criminal complaint against Denník N and the authors of the article.

=== 2024 European Parliament election ===
For the 2024 European Parliament election, the party was firstly considering a joint electoral list together with Svobodní. However, the party later announced a coalition with the Přísaha movement, with their joint list being led by Filip Turek. The coalition wants to reverse the European Green Deal and the ban on sale of petrol and diesel cars starting from 2035. It also claims to stand against illegal immigration and the adoption of euro as the Czech Republic's national currency.

=== 2025 Czech parliamentary election ===
At the beginning of 2025, the party announced that it would contest the 2025 Czech parliamentary election independently, after a membership vote favored that option. Party leader Macinka welcomed the decision, claiming it would allow the party to maintain "ideological purity". However, the party did not rule out offering places on its lists to members of other parties, such as Svobodní, and said it wanted to continue cooperating with Robert Šlachta of Přísaha. At the same time, the Motorists began to cross the 5% electoral threshold in some opinion polls.

The party said its goal for the election was to overtake the Civic Democratic Party (ODS) in number of seats. Party officials expressed negative views towards a possible coalition with ODS, rather favouring the possibility of forming a government with the right-wing populist ANO. However, Macinka rejected the possibility of any cooperation with the Stačilo! alliance.

== Motor Generation ==
In July 2024, the party established a youth wing, Motor Generation, under the leadership of former Svobodní member and Ostrava-Vítkovice councillor Matěj Gregor. Gregor claimed that the purpose of the organization is to offer a right-wing political alternative for young people and provide a voice for conservative youth, as well as bringing "order and discipline" into members' lives.

However, a controversy erupted shortly after the organization's foundation, as it set up a photo booth at its inaugural congress featuring cards with the quotes "I have an SS dagger at home", "Certified racist", and "Congress 9.11.", with an image of a plane and the Twin Towers.

Respekt also reported that Gregor was planning on creating a network of Motor Generation clubs at Czech universities under the disguise of "conservative clubs", as it is illegal to create partisan organizations in universities under Czech law. In an internal memo, Gregor allegedly said that the clubs would "create hell" for progressives in the academic field and would make them "whine and scream". Gregor later confirmed the authenticity of the memo, but called it "twisted" by the media. He also denied comparisons made between the organization and Hitler Youth or the youth organizations of the Communist Party of Czechoslovakia.

== Election results ==
=== Chamber of Deputies of the Czech Republic ===
Year	Leader	Vote	Vote %	Seats	±	Place	Government
2025	Filip Turek	380,601	6.77	13 / 200	New	6th	ANO–SPD–AUTO

=== Senate ===
Election	Candidates	First round				Second round			Seats	Total Seats	+/–
Election	Candidates	Votes	%	Runners-up	Place	Votes	%	Place	Seats	Total Seats	+/–
2024	1	7,664	0.97	0 / 27	14th	—N/a			0 / 27	0 / 81	New

=== European Parliament ===
Election	List leader	Votes	%	Seats	+/–	EP Group
2024 (Note: Ran as part of the Přísaha and Motorists coalition.)	Filip Turek	304,623	10.26 (#3) (Přísaha and Motorists)	1 / 21	New	Patriots for Europe

=== Prague municipal elections ===
Year	Leader	Vote	Vote %	Seats	Place
2022	Petr Macinka	540,209	2.29%	0 / 65	7th
2026	Klára Sovová	715,424	2.91%	0 / 65	7th

=== Local elections ===
Election	Votes	%	Seats	+/–
2026	1,571,788	1.41	20 / 62,178	
