= Přísaha =

Czech political party founded in 2021

Přísaha Civic Movement Přísaha občanské hnutí
- Leader: Robert Šlachta
- Founder: Robert Šlachta
- Founded: 27 January 2021
- Registered: 8 April 2021
- Headquarters: Horská 2106/2b 128 00 Prague
- Membership: 300
- Ideology: Populism; Euroscepticism
- Political position: Right-wing
- National affiliation: Přísaha and Motorists (2024–2025)
- European affiliation: Patriots.eu (2024–2026)
- European Parliament group: Patriots for Europe (2024–2026); Non-Inscrits (2026)
- Colours: Blue
- European Parliament: 0 / 21
- Chamber of Deputies: 0 / 200
- Senate: 1 / 81
- Local councilors: 51 / 61,892

Website
- prisaha.cz

Přísaha (lit. 'Oath') is a populist political party in the Czech Republic, founded in 2021 by Robert Šlachta.

== History ==
=== Foundation ===
Šlachta became known to the public as the investigator in a political corruption scandal in 2013. Following media speculation in 2020 that he could found a new political party, Šlachta announced his new party at a press conference on 27 January 2021, stating that it would campaign against corruption, and would participate in the 2021 general election. Šlachta's party is named Přísaha, taken from the title of his autobiography, Třicet let pod přísahou (lit. 'Thirty Years Under Oath'). Šlachta has also criticised the Czech government for its handling of the COVID-19 pandemic.

Other figures involved in the party include Šlachta's former police colleagues Tomáš Sochr and Jiří Komárek.

=== 2021 parliamentary election ===
For the 2021 parliamentary election, the party's manifesto focused on the handling of the COVID-19 pandemic, judicial reform, and prevention of illegal employment of migrants. Šlachta also proposed making ministers and bureaucrats liable for financial damage to the state. Přísaha also opposed the adoption of the Euro, pledged not to raise any taxes, and proposed several tax reductions, including slashing VAT rates.

In May 2021, Přísaha rose above the 5% threshold in opinion polling for the first time. Several polls concluded just before the election also showed the party above the 5% line to achieve representation in the Chamber of Deputies.

However, in the election itself, the party narrowly missed out on the threshold, receiving 4.68% of the total vote. Šlachta nonetheless argued that the result was a "big success", as the party won more votes than both "hundred-years old" parties, the Social Democrats (ČSSD) and the Communist Party. He also noted that, thanks to the result, the party secured about 63 million CZK in state funding.

Some scholars and data journalists pointed out that Přísaha's vote share prevented the governing ANO 2011 from winning the election, and also contributed to ČSSD's failure to pass the threshold.

=== 2022 elections ===
In the beginning of 2022, several high-profile members left Přísaha, including the leaders of its Prague chapter. The party struggled to attract well-known candidates for the 2022 Czech Senate election, and eventually ran one candidate, former ČSSD MP and Minister of Culture Antonín Staněk, in Senate district 64 (Bruntál). Staněk received 4.37% of the vote, finishing last.

In the 2022 municipal elections, the party presented a list in 62 municipalities, including several big cities such as Brno, Ostrava, Plzeň, and Prague. Šlachta himself ran in his hometown of Pohořelice, where he hoped to become the mayor.

The party won 51 local council seats nationwide, but failed to pass the threshold in any regional capitals. In Pohořelice, the party finished first with 41.28% of the vote and won 9 out of 21 seats, just short of a majority. However, all other parties which gained representation on the local council in Pohořelice (ODS, ANO, STAN, TOP 09 and Moravané) formed a coalition without Šlachta, making Přísaha the sole opposition party in the city. Šlachta described the pact as a "swamp".

=== 2024 European parliament election and Senate election ===
In November 2023, Přísaha announced its intention to run in the 2024 European parliament election, without further details. It was speculated that the leader of its South Bohemian branch, Nikola Bartůšek, was set to be the list leader. In January 2024, the party announced an electoral coalition with Motorists for Themselves, who had previously negotiated with Svobodní, but finally opted for a coalition with Přísaha.

The list is led by motor racing driver Filip Turek, with Bartůšek in the second spot for Přísaha. Přísaha has nominated 15 out of the 28 candidates on the list, with leader Robert Šlachta in 28th place.

Přísaha and the Motorists also agreed to jointly nominate Šlachta as a candidate for the Senate in his home district 56 –Břeclav.

=== 2025 parliamentary election ===
Přísaha expressed an intention to extend the coalition with the Motorists for the 2025 Czech parliamentary election, citing their success in the European Parliament election. However, the Motorists voted overwhelmingly against this at their party congress, preferring to run alone following a surge in the opinion polls. Šlachta said he was "disappointed" and that he had learned the results of the vote from media reports. Motorists' leader Macinka said his party was still open to cooperation, but that this must be in the form of Přísaha's candidates on Motorists' list, not as an equal coalition.

After the coalition breakdown, Přísaha entered talks with Stačilo!, Freedom and Direct Democracy (SPD) and Social Democracy. In February, the talks with Stačilo! broke down due to the latter's stance towards Czech membership of the EU and NATO. Šlachta said that talks with the other parties would also end soon, as Přísaha had failed to reach a pre-electoral agreement with either of them.

Hospodářské noviny reported that Přísaha was struggling with the funding of its electoral campaign. The party planned to spend up to 40 million Czech crowns on campaigning, however, as of February 2025, its bank accounts were nearly empty. In the election, the party missed out on the threshold, receiving 1.07% of the total vote.

On 24 April 2026, Přísaha announced that both of their MEPs, Nikola Bartůšek and Antonín Staněk, had left the party.

=== Party names ===
- 2021–2023: Přísaha — Robert Šlachta's Civic Movement (Czech: Přísaha — občanské hnutí Roberta Šlachty, Přísaha)
- From 2023: Přísaha Civic Movement (Czech: Přísaha občanské hnutí, Přísaha)

== Election results ==
=== Chamber of Deputies ===
Date	Leader	Votes		Seats			Position
Date	Leader	No.	%	No.	±	Size	Position
2021	Robert Šlachta	251,562	4.68	0 / 200	0	5th	No seats
2025	Robert Šlachta	60,503	1.08	0 / 200	0	8th	No seats

=== Senate ===
Election	Candidates	First round				Second round			Seats	Total Seats	+/–
Election	Candidates	Votes	%	Runners-up	Place	Votes	%	Place	Seats	Total Seats	+/–
2022	1	1,471	0.13	0 / 27	37th	—N/a			0 / 27	0 / 81	New
2024	1	8,099	1.02	1 / 27	13th	8,614	2.21	8th	1 / 27	1 / 81	▲1
2026	4	7,951	0.69	0 / 27	19th	—N/a			0 / 27	1 / 81	Steady

=== European Parliament ===
Election	List leader	Votes	%	Seats	+/–	EP Group
2024 (Note: Ran as part of the Přísaha and Motorists coalition.)	Filip Turek	304,623	10.26 (#3)	1 / 21	New	PfE

=== Local elections ===
Election	Votes	%	Seats	+/–
2026	120,208	0.11	25 / 62,178	
