= Robert Šlachta =

Czech politician

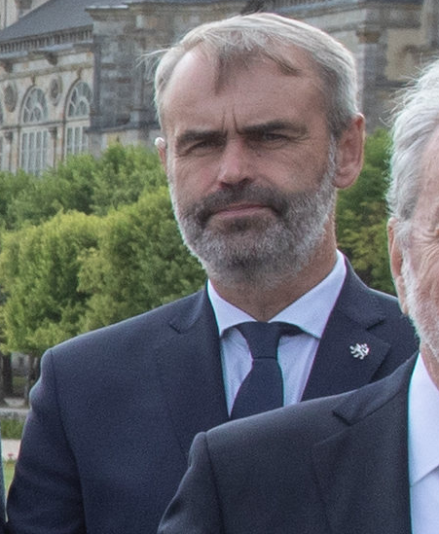
- Robert Šlachta (2025)

Leader of Přísaha
- Incumbent
- Assumed office 26 June 2021
- Preceded by: Position established

Chair of the Unit for Combating Organised Crime (ÚOOZ)
- In office 1 January 2008 – 30 June 2016
- Preceded by: Jan Kubice
- Succeeded by: Milan Komárek

Senator from Břeclav
- Incumbent
- Assumed office 13 October 2024
- Preceded by: Rostislav Koštial

Personal details
- Born: 22 July 1971 (age 55) Boskovice, Czechoslovakia
- Party: Přísaha (2021–present)
- Education: Masaryk University
- Occupation: politician; customs officer

Robert Šlachta (born 22 July 1971) is a Czech politician and former police and customs officer who has been serving as the senator for Břeclav since 2024. He has been the leader of Přísaha since June 2021. He was previously head of the Unit for Combating Organised Crime (Czech: Útvar pro odhalování organizovaného zločinu, ÚOOZ) from January 2008 to June 2016.
