= 2025 Social Democracy (Czech Republic) leadership election =

Political party election

2025 SOCDEM leadership election
- 13 December 2025
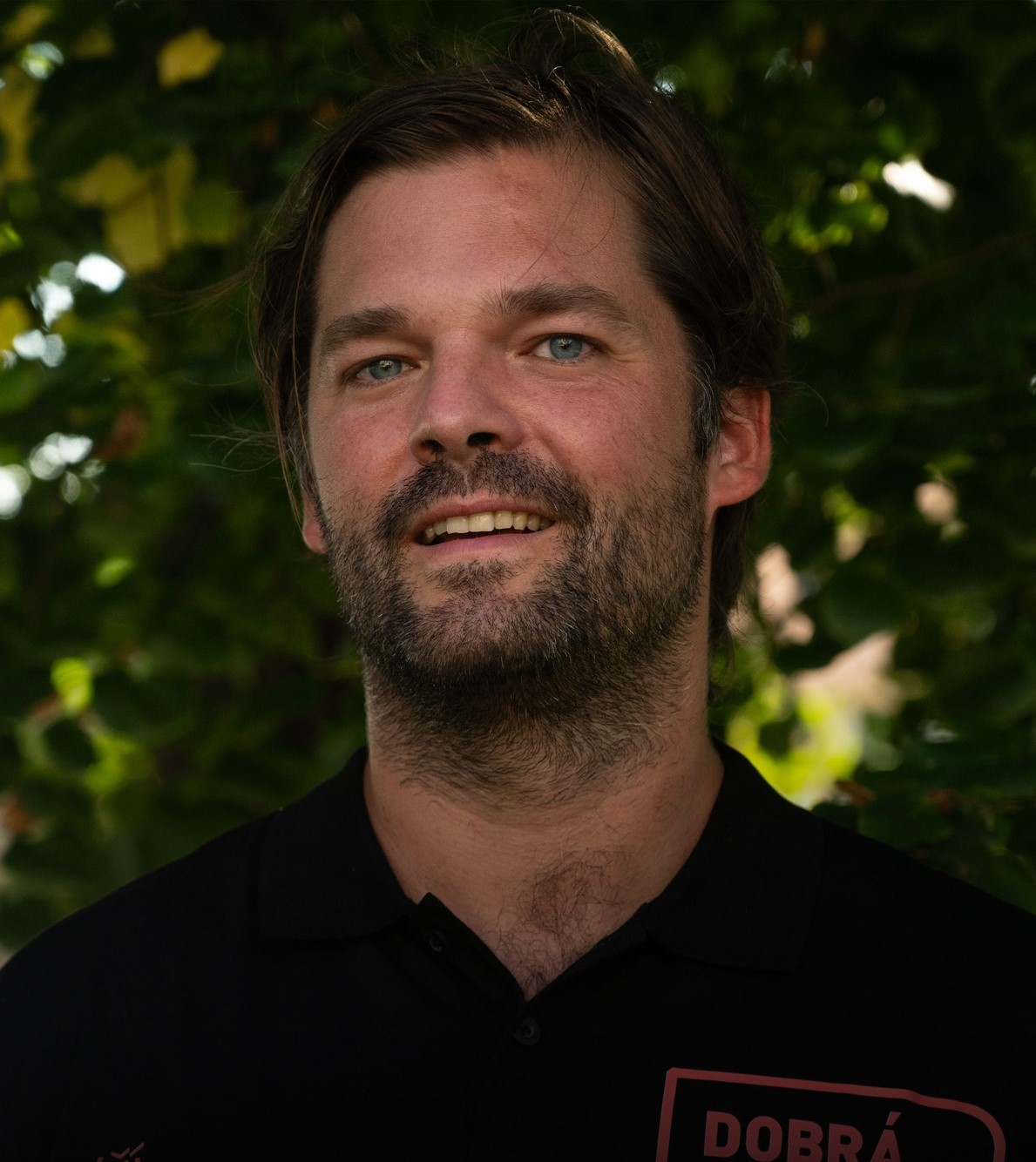

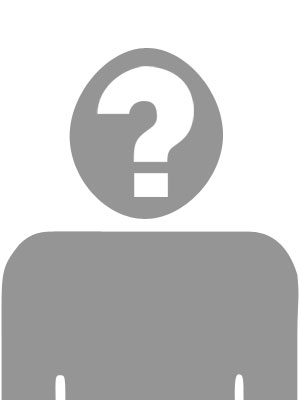

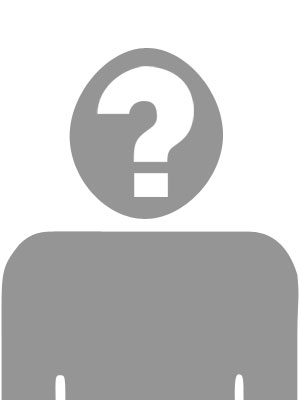
Candidate	Jiří Nedvěd	Petr Pavlík	Petr Hůla
Electoral vote	67	47	12
Percentage	51.9%	35.3%	9.0%
Leader of SOCDEM before election
Jana Maláčová
Leader of SOCDEM
Jiří Nedvěd

An election for the leader of Social Democracy (SOCDEM) was held on 13 December 2025 due to the resignation of the incumbent Jana Maláčová.

== Background ==
Since the 2021 parliamentary election, the party had internal clashes. In 2024, Jana Maláčová was elected leader. After complicated negotiations, SOCDEM joined Stačilo! and multiple prominent members like Martin Netolický, Jiří Dienstbier Jr., Michal Šmarda and Petr Vícha left the party in protest. Maláčová resigned after the alliance failed to meet the 5% threshold in the 2025 parliamentary election. Petr Pavlík was backed by former prime minister Vladimír Špidla, while Jiří Nedvěd was supported by the incumbent leadership.

== Candidates ==
- Jiří Nedvěd, deputy leader and leader of the Central Bohemian branch
- Petr Pavlík, former leader of the Prague branch
- Petr Hůla, Prague 12 Councillor

=== Expressed interest ===
- Lukáš Blaschko
- Miloslav Čihák
- Jan Tichý

== Endorsements ==
Jiří Nedvěd
- Jana Maláčová, incumbent leader
- Lubomír Zaorálek, incumbent deputy leader
Petr Pavlík
- Vladimír Špidla, former Prime Minister
Petr Hůla
- Lukáš Blaschko

== Voting ==
Voting was held on 13 December 2025. 133 delegates were present.

Candidate	Vote	%
Jiří Nedvěd	69	51.88
Petr Pavlík	47	35.34
Petr Hůla	12	9.02
None of the above	5	3.76
