= 2024 Social Democracy (Czech Republic) leadership election =

2024 SOCDEM leadership election
- 5 October 2024
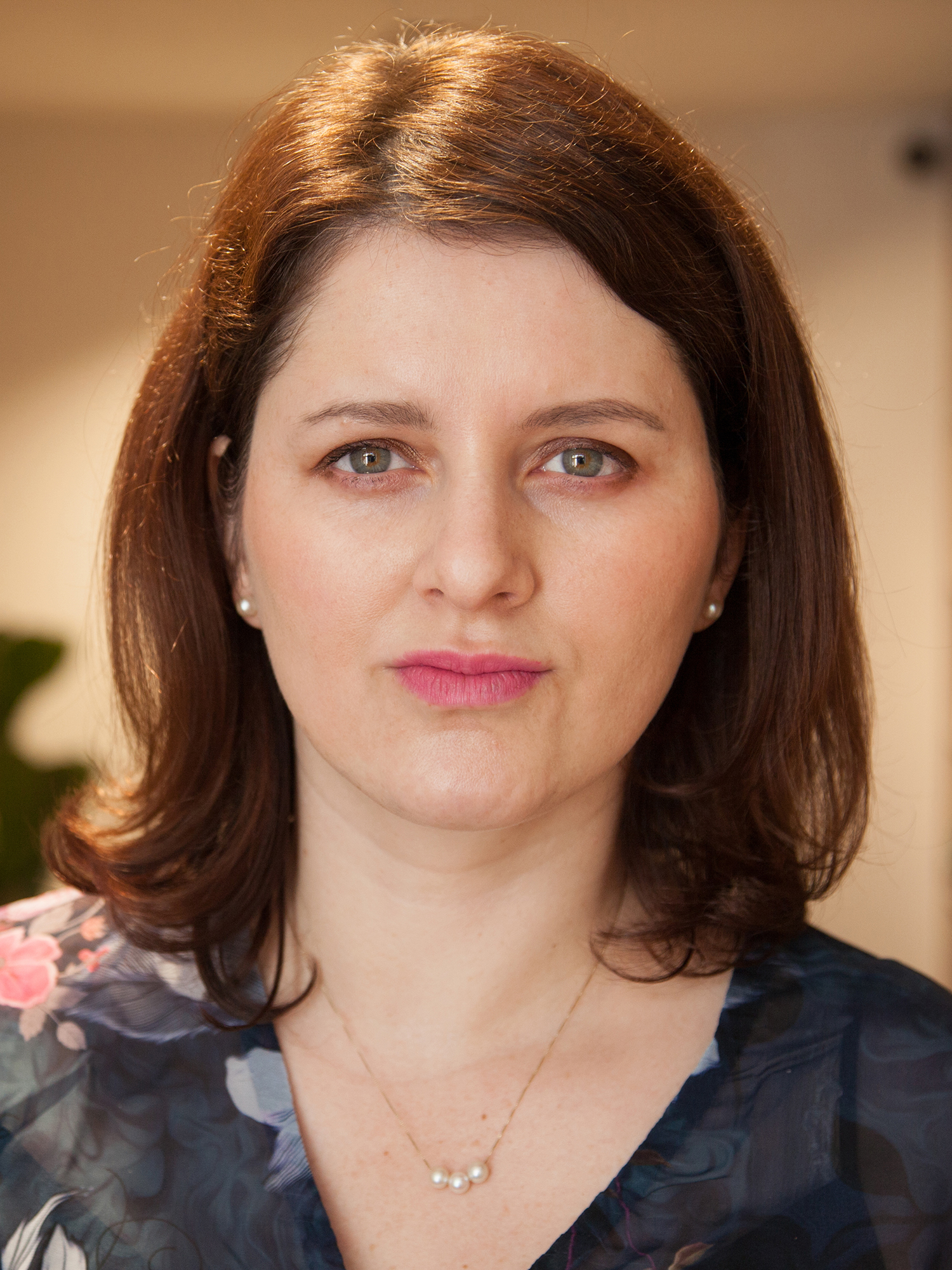

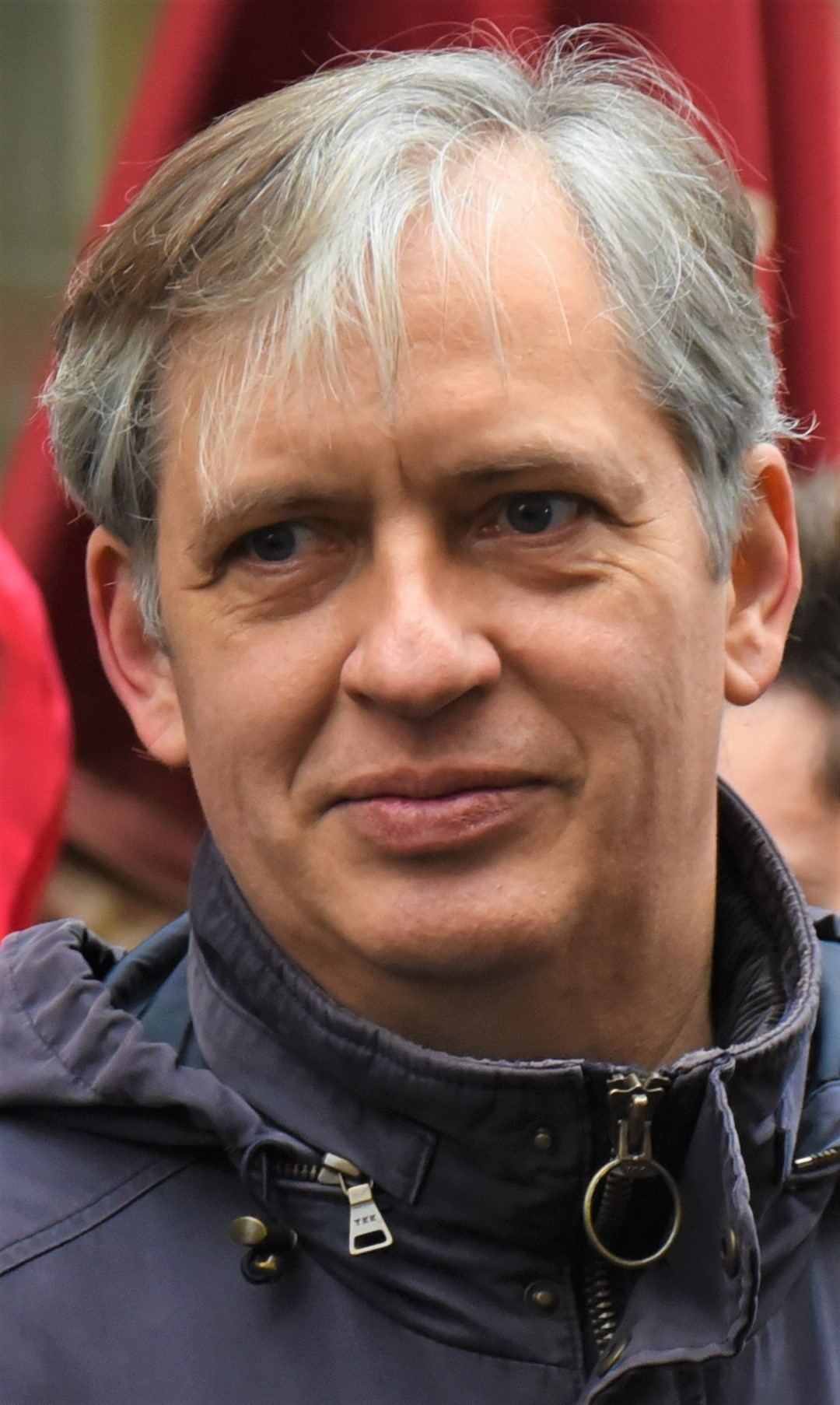

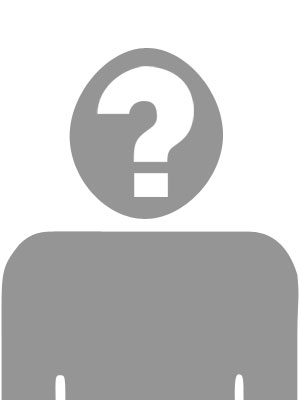
Candidate	Jana Maláčová	Jiří Dienstbier Jr.	Petr Hůla
Electoral vote	101	33	5
Percentage	66.4%	21.7%	3.3%
Leader of SOCDEM before election
Michal Šmarda
Leader of SOCDEM
Jana Maláčová

An election for the leader of Social Democracy (SOCDEM) was held on 5 October 2024 due to the resignation of the incumbent Michal Šmarda.

== Background ==
SOCDEM (then named the Czech Social Democratic Party) participated in the 2021 Czech legislative election, receiving only 4.65% votes and losing all its seats in the Chamber of Deputies. Leader Jan Hamáček announced he would resign as a result. Michal Šmarda was elected the new leader afterwards. After the 2024 European Parliament election, Šmarda announced that a new leadership election will be held in October 2024. Šmarda resigned as party leader after the 2024 Czech regional elections in September 2024 stating that SOCDEM should be led by members who succeeded in regional elections. Šmarda mentioned Pardubice regional Governor Martin Netolický and Mayor of Rokytnice v Orlických horách Jiří Štěpán as potential successors. Jana Maláčová stated that she considers running and eventually announced candidacy on 24 September 2024. On 1 October 2024 Jiří Dienstbier Jr. announced his candidacy.

Maláčová stated her support for a broad left-wing coalition based on the French New Popular Front and did not rule out talks with the socially conservative Stačilo!. This would violate the Bohumín Resolution from 1995, in which they denounced any cooperation with extremist parties like KSČM, which is part of Stačilo. Maláčová criticized SOCDEM for not attacking the government enough and stated that their main task should be rise of poverty and decrease of living standards rather than socio-cultural issues. Meanwhile Dienstbier emphasized the need for a "modern European-style left-wing party" and stated his support for a coalition with the progressive Green Party and Budoucnost.

== Candidates ==
- Jiří Dienstbier Jr., former Minister of the Czech Republic for Human Rights and Equal Opportunities
- Petr Hůla, Prague 12 Councillor
- Jana Maláčová, former Minister of Labour and Social Affairs.

=== Potential candidates ===
- Jiří Štěpán, Mayor of Rokytnice v Orlických horách. Suggested by Šmarda as potential candidate.

=== Declined to run ===
- Martin Netolický, Pardubice regional governor. Suggested by Šmarda as potential candidate but he declined to run.

== Endorsements ==
Jiří Dienstbier Jr.
- Oto Novotný, long-time adviser to the chairmen of the ČSSD
- Tomáš Petříček, former Minister of Foreign Affairs
Jana Maláčová
- Jan Chvojka, former Minister for Human Rights and Equal Opportunities
- Lukáš Nozar, candidate for senate from Mladá Boleslav
- Josef Středula, chairman of the Czech-Moravian Confederation of Trade Unions
- Matěj Stropnický, former Leader of the Green Party (Independent)
- Lubomír Zaorálek, former Minister of Foreign Affairs, former Minister of Culture, 2023 leadership candidate

== Voting ==
Voting was held on 5 October 2024. 152 delegates were present.

Candidate	Vote	%
Jana Maláčová	101	66.44
Jiří Dienstbier Jr.	33	21.71
Petr Hůla	5	3.29
None of the above	13	8.55

== Reactions ==
The Left Party congratulated Maláčová and stated that her election "raised expectations that it would be possible to start broad cooperation across left-wing entities." On 20 October, both Maláčová and Czech Sovereignty of Social Democracy (ČSSD) leader Jiří Paroubek called for a left-wing alliance.

Two former ministers, Tomáš Petříček, Petra Buzková and Jakub Landovský, former Czech ambassador to the North Atlantic Treaty Organization left the party following the election of Maláčová. Shortly after their departure, Petříček, former Pirate MEP Mikuláš Peksa, vice leader of the Green Party Tomáš Mígl and leader of Budoucnost Jakub Kovařík signed a manifesto calling for cooperation between the progressive movements and the creation an "alternative bloc" to the government composed of Spolu and STAN and to the opposition composed of ANO 2011 and SPD. Dienstbier later signed the manifesto.
