= New Social Democracy (Czech Republic) =

Political party in the Czech Republic

New Social Democracy Nová sociální demokracie
- Abbreviation: NSD
- Leader: Vladimír Špidla
- Founders: Vladimír Špidla; Jiří Dienstbier Jr.; Petr Pavlík; Miroslava Dušková Smrčková; Tomáš Krejčí; David Kopecký
- Founded: 1 May 2026
- Registered: 18 June 2026
- Split from: Social Democracy
- Headquarters: Verdunská 910/28 160 00 Praha
- Ideology: Social democracy; Green politics; Pro-Europeanism
- Political position: Centre-left
- Colours: Red
- Chamber of Deputies: 0 / 200
- Senate: 0 / 81

Website
- novasd.cz

New Social Democracy (Czech: Nová sociální demokracie; NSD) is a Czech centre-left political party founded in 2026 as a split from Social Democracy.

== History ==
The initiative to create a new party came from members of the Social Democratic Party after Jiří Nedvěd became party chairman at the December 2025 party congress, defeating critics of the party's previous direction, which had led to the party's unsuccessful attempt to run with the Stačilo! movement in the 2025 parliamentary election.

New Social Democracy held its founding congress on 1 May 2026. The application for party registration was submitted on 8 June 2026, and the party was registered on 19 June 2026. The committee collecting signatures to establish the new party included former ČSSD Prime Minister Vladimír Špidla, former Minister of Human Rights and Equal Opportunities Jiří Dienstbier Jr., and Nedvěd's opponent at 2025 leadership election, Petr Pavlík. The party was also supported by former Communist Party MP Jiří Dolejš.

== Ideology ==
The party declares itself to be the bearer of social democratic ideas. According to the founders of NSD, the original centre-left Czech party, Social Democracy, had ceased to represent social democratic ideas, with no chance of reform. NSD founder Vladimir Špidla also sharply criticized Social Democracy's cooperation with the Communist Party and Stačilo!.

NSD stated its intention to establish cooperation with other left-wing organizations, such as Budoucnost, The Left, and Idealisté.

The party claims to be financed by small contributions to avoid dependence on oligarchs.
