= 2021 Czech Social Democratic Party leadership election =

2021 Czech Social Democratic Party leadership election may refer to:

- April 2021 Czech Social Democratic Party leadership election
- December 2021 Czech Social Democratic Party leadership election
