= 2023 Czech Social Democratic Party leadership election =

2023 ČSSD leadership election
- 10 June 2023
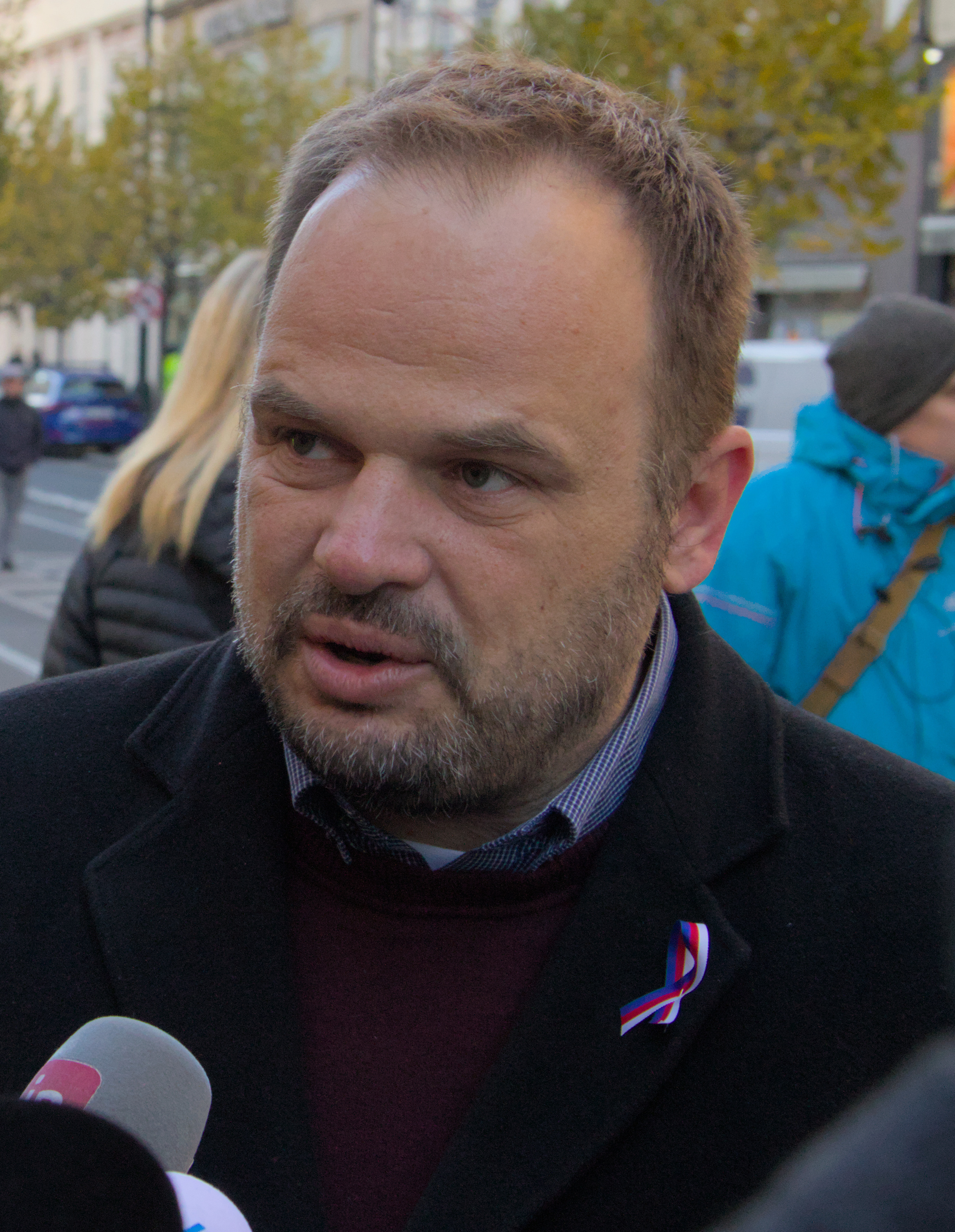

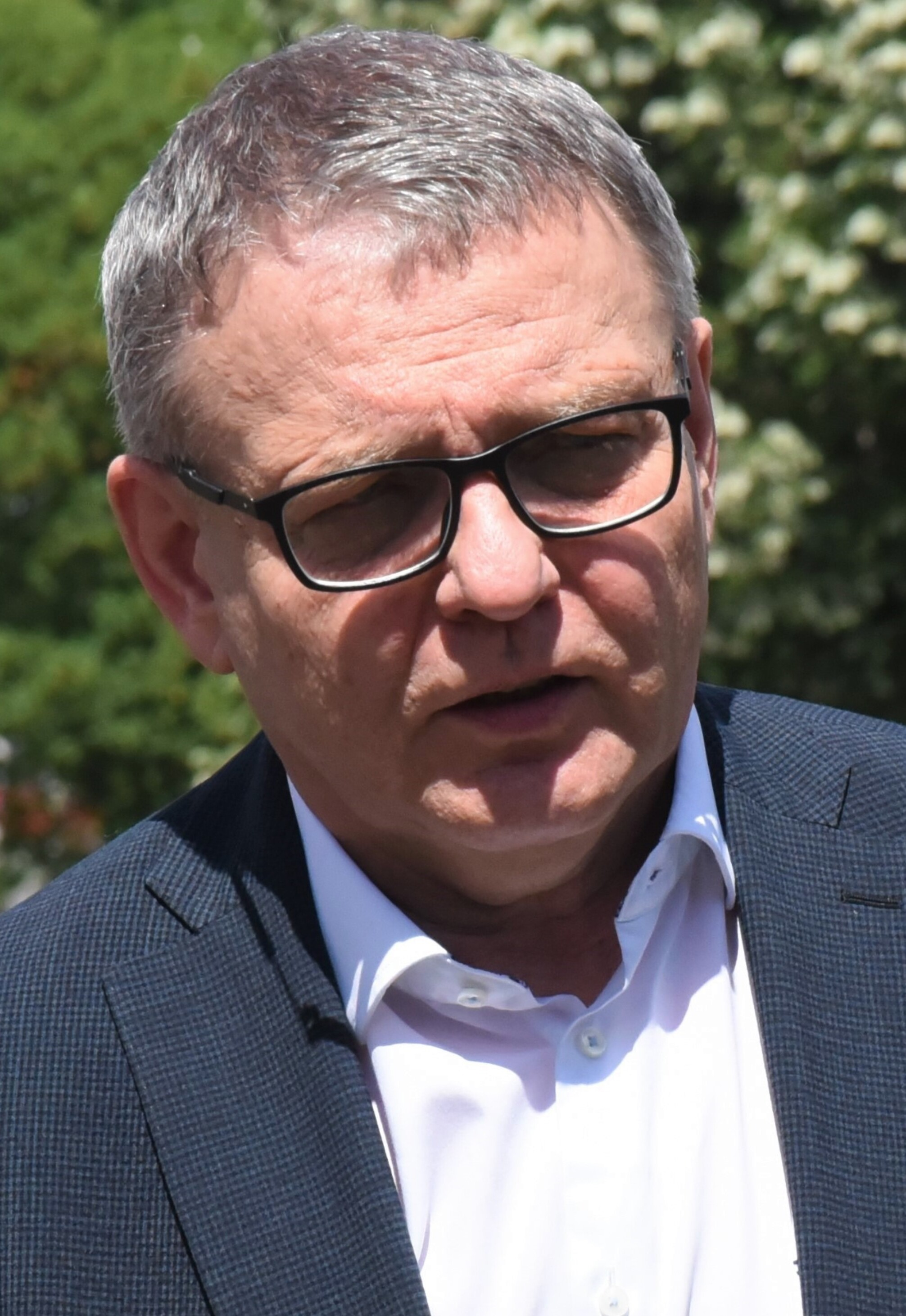

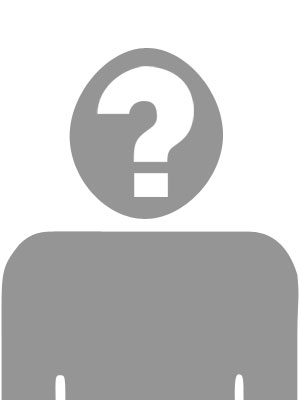
| Candidate | Michal Šmarda | Lubomír Zaorálek | Břetislav Štefan |
| Electoral vote | 97 | 58 | 20 |
| Percentage | 55.1% | 33.0% | 11.2% |
Leader of ČSSD before election
Michal Šmarda
Leader of SOCDEM
Michal Šmarda

A leadership election for the Czech Social Democratic Party (ČSSD) was held on 10 June 2023. Party congress decided the renaming of the party to Social Democracy (SOCDEM). Michal Šmarda was re-elected as the leader.

== Background ==
ČSSD participated in 2021 Czech legislative election. It received only 4.65% votes and lost all its seats in the Chamber of Deputies. Leader Jan Hamáček announced he would resign as a result. Michal Šmarda was elected new leader afterwards.

Election was set for June 2023. Šmarda was eligible for the re-election and received endorsement from 8 regional organisations as of 22 April 2023. Seznam Zprávy reported on 14 May 2023 reported that Šmarda has not decided yet whether he will run for leadership. Břetislav Štefan on the other hand has his candidacy confirmed. Jana Maláčová who received nomination refused to run. Šmarda announced candidacy on 30 May 2023.

== Candidates ==
- Michal Šmarda, Mayor of Nové Město na Moravě and incumbent leader.
- Břetislav Štefan, Mayor of Brno-Líšeň and Deputy leader of ČSSD.
- Lubomír Zaorálek, former Minister of Foreign Affairs, Minister of Culture and Member of the Chamber of Deputies (MP).

== Declined ==
- Jana Maláčová, former Minister of Labour and Social Affairs.

== Voting ==
Voting was held on 10 June 2023. 176 delegates voted. 97 delegates voted for Šmarda, 58 for Zaorálek and 20 for Štefan.

| Candidate | Vote | % |
|---|---|---|
| Michal Šmarda | 97 | 55.11 |
| Lubomír Zaorálek | 58 | 32.95 |
| Břetislav Štefan | 20 | 11.36 |
| None of the above | 1 | 0.57 |
