= Tomáš Prouza =

Czech economist

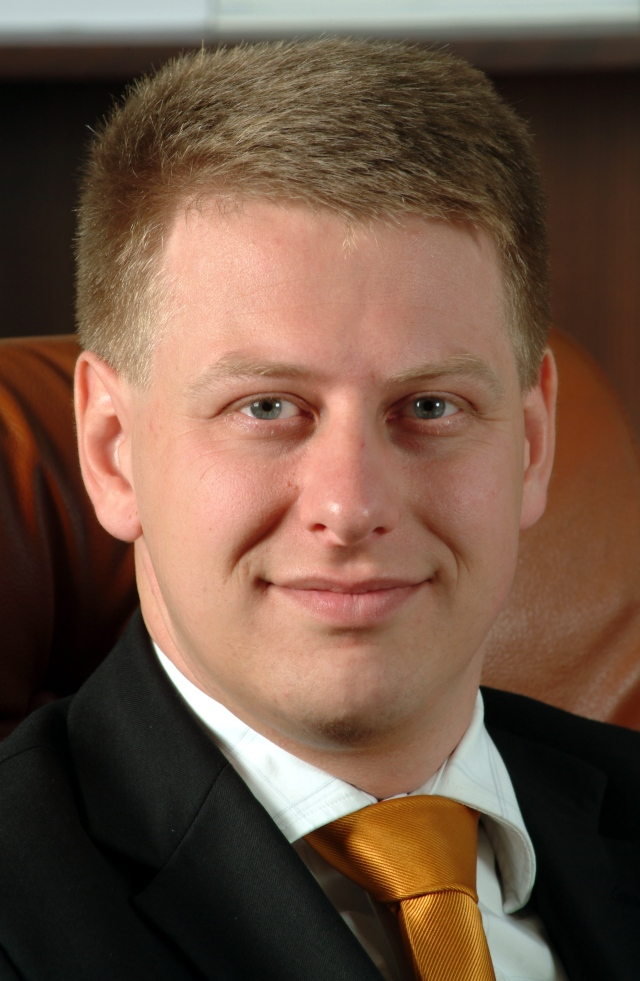

State Secretary for European Affairs
- In office 3 January 2014 – 31 March 2017
- Prime Minister: Bohuslav Sobotka
- Preceded by: Vojtěch Belling
- Succeeded by: Aleš Chmelař

1st Czech Coordinator for Digital Agenda
- In office 18 May 2016 – 31 March 2017
- Preceded by: Position established
- Succeeded by: Ondřej Malý

Personal details
- Born: 30 April 1973 (age 53) Ostrava, Czechoslovakia (now Czech Republic)
- Party: ČSSD (2015–2018)
- Education: Open University; University of Economics, Prague

Tomáš Prouza (born 30 April 1973) is a Czech economist, former Deputy Minister of Finance (2004–2007) and from January 2014 to March 2017 State Secretary for European Affairs at the Czech Prime Minister's Office. In May 2016 the Government appointed Tomáš Prouza as the coordinator for the digital agenda. His main task was to synchronize and manage all governmental activities and communication for support of the digital economy and digitalization of public administration among the ministries and other central governmental institutions. He resigned his government positions on 31 March 2017 and went to establish his own consulting company EU Politics Advisory. On 1 October 2018 he has become President of the Confederation of Trade and Tourism of the Czech Republic.

== Career ==
Between 2012 and 2014, he worked at the World Bank in Washington, D.C., as an expert on consumer protection in financial services.

After leaving the Ministry of Finance in 2007, he co-founded Partners Financial Services, a financial distribution company, where he acted as the member of the board responsible for compliance and customer care.

He also served between 2009 and 2012 as the chairman of the board of Prague Philharmonia, founded in 1994 by Czech conductor Jiří Bělohlávek.

When serving as the deputy finance minister between 2004 and 2007, he was responsible for financial services, EU and international relations, fiscal policy and euro adoption. Between November 2005 and December 2006 he was the first National Coordinator for Euro Introduction in the Czech Republic. He also represented the Czech Republic in the Ecofin Council, Economic and Finance Committee and Financial Services Committee of the European Council and served as the Deputy Governor of the International Monetary Fund for the Czech Republic.

He started his career as economic journalist, first in the Czech-English monthly The Prague Tribune where he was responsible for Czech editing and financial section of the magazine, and then between 2000 and 2004 as the founder and CEO of the personal finance website www.penize.cz.

Prouza graduated from the University of Economics in Prague (majoring in international politics and diplomacy) and received his MBA from the Open University.

== Awards and honours ==
In 2016, Tomáš Prouza was awarded the Legion of Honour.
