= Aleš Chmelař =

Czech politician (born 1987)

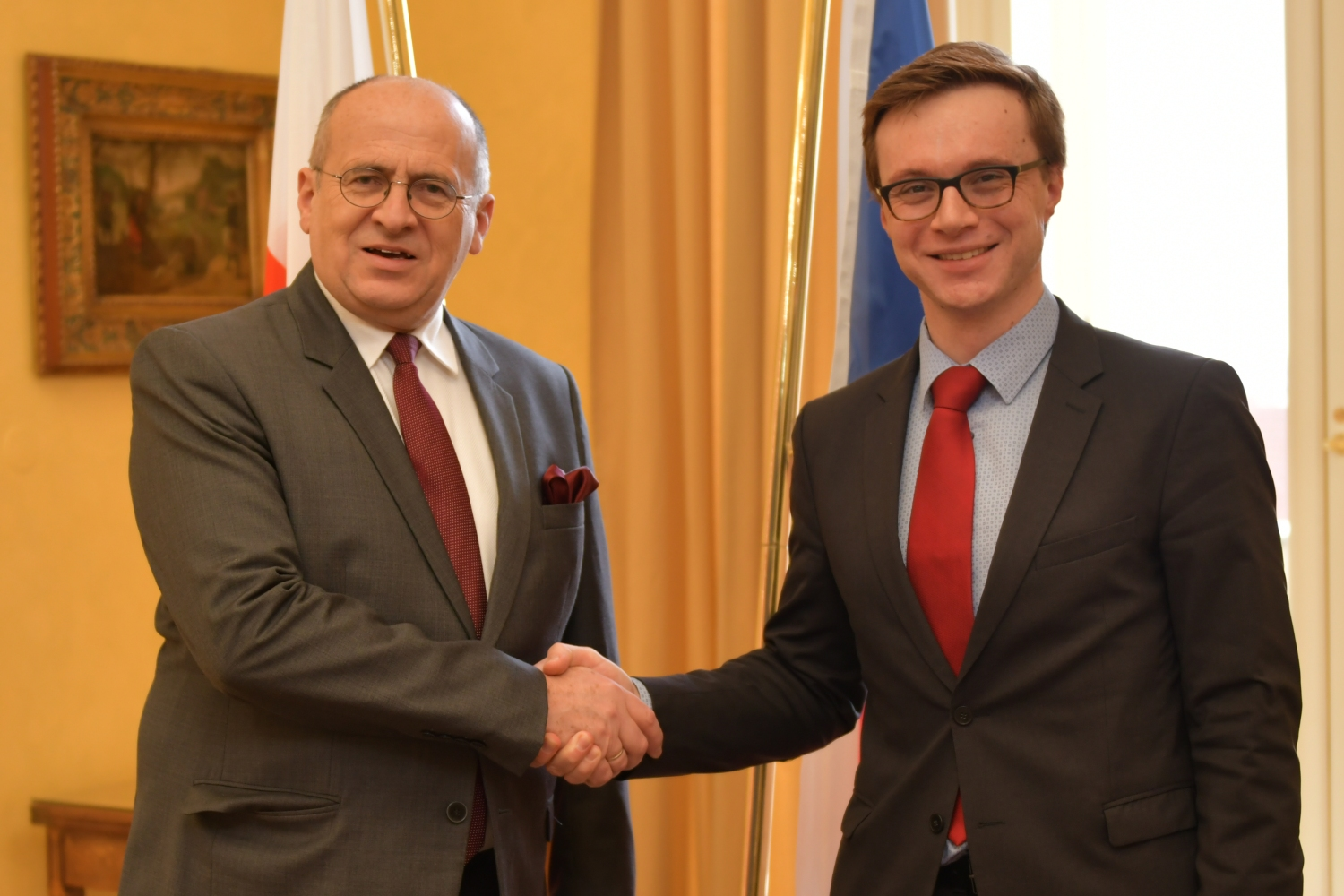
- Chmelař (right) with Zbigniew Rau in 2020

Permanent representative at the OECD
- Incumbent
- Assumed office 28 July 2022
- Preceded by: Petr Gandalovič

State Secretary for European Affairs
- In office 21 June 2017 – 30 November 2018
- Prime Minister: Bohuslav Sobotka; Andrej Babiš
- Preceded by: Tomáš Prouza
- Succeeded by: Milena Hrdinková

Personal details
- Born: 11 September 1987 (age 38) Brno, Czechoslovakia
- Spouse: Jana Maláčová (m. 2015–2023)
- Children: One son
- Education: Sciences Po; London School of Economics

Aleš Chmelař (born 11 September 1987) is a Czech economist, diplomat and senior civil servant. He has been permanent representative of the Czech Republic for the OECD since July 2022. Chmelař previously served for the State Secretary for European Affairs, Deputy Minister of Foreign Affairs of the Czech Republic for the EU.

== Early life and education ==
Chmelař attended Matyáš Lerch High School in Brno to complete a six-year bilingual section. Between 2007 and 2010, he studied economic and politic sciences at Sciences Po Paris, receiving a BA degree. From 2010 until 2011, Chmelař attended London School of Economics and specialised in the economic and monetary policy of the EU, receiving the MSc. degree. Apart from his native Czech, he can speak English, French, and German.

== Political career ==
Between 2012 and 2014, Chmelař worked as an analyst and researcher of the financial markets section, later head of credit market research at the Centre for European Policy Studies. He was a regular member of Social Democracy under the Cabinet of Bohuslav Sobotka.

Since 2016, Chmelař has been a member of the board of directors of the Masaryk Democratic Party. He also has served as director of the Department of Coordination of European Union since 2017, specializing in economic and monetary policy. On 21 June 2017, Chmelař replaced Tomáš Prouza as State Secretary for European Affairs.

On 20 September 2018, following disagreements with Prime Minister Andrej Babiš, various news media speculated that Chmelař would announce his intention to resign as State Secretary for European Affairs. Chmelař served as Deputy Minister of Foreign Affairs of the Czech Republic until May 2022, stating that he would become the ambassador of the Czech Republic to the OECD in Paris.

== Personal life ==
Between 2015 and 2023, Chmelař was married to Jana Maláčová, former Minister of Labor and Social Affairs of the Czech Republic in the Second Cabinet of Andrej Babiš. They have a son named Gustav together.
