= 2001 Czech Social Democratic Party leadership election =

2001 ČSSD leadership election
- 7 April 2001
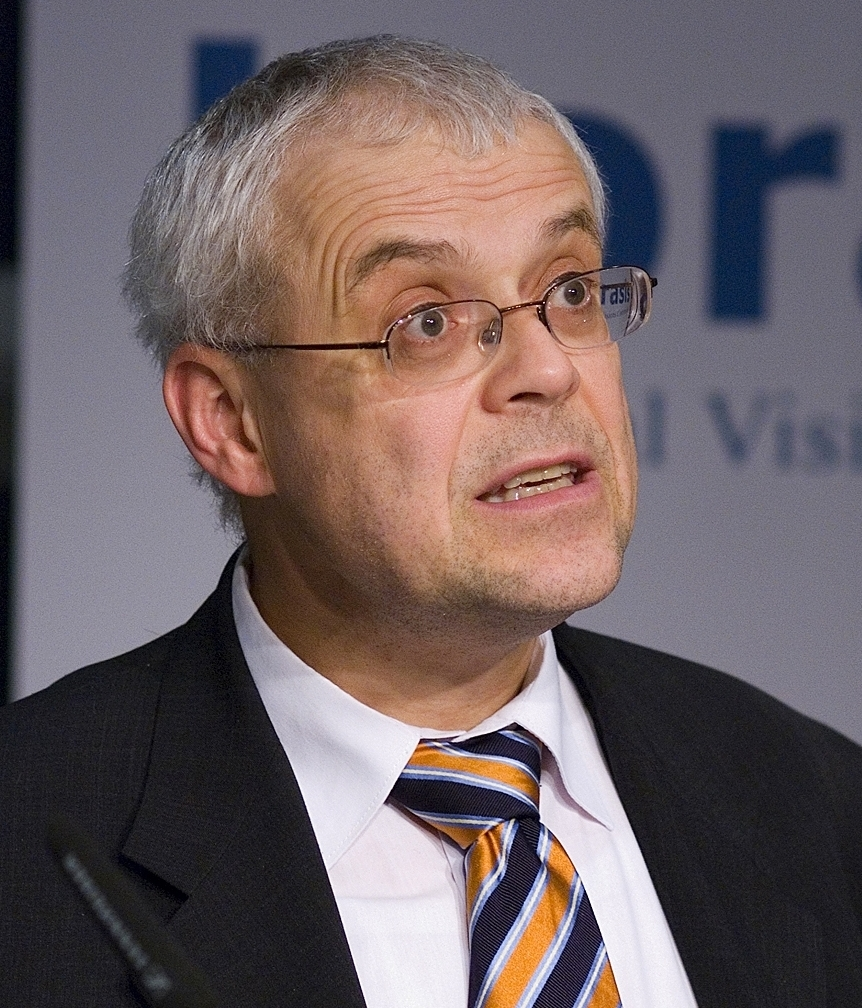
Candidate	Vladimír Špidla
Electoral vote	485
Percentage	87.5%
Leader of ČSSD before election
Miloš Zeman
Elected Leader of ČSSD
Vladimír Špidla

The Czech Social Democratic Party (ČSSD) leadership election of 2001 was held on 7 April 2001. Prime Minister of the Czech Republic and incumbent leader Miloš Zeman decided to not seek re-election. Vladimír Špidla was elected his successor. Špidla was the only candidate.

552 delegates were allowed to vote. 543 of them voted. Špidla received 485 votes.

== Voting ==
Vladimír Špidla	Against
485	58
