= Jiří Šedivý =

Czech politician (born 1963)

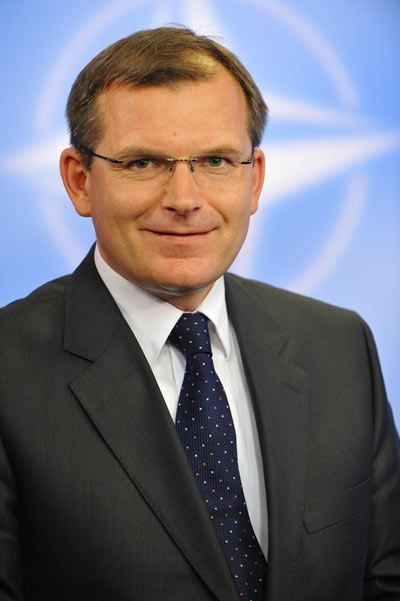

Minister of Defence
- In office 4 September 2006 – 9 January 2007
- Prime Minister: Mirek Topolánek
- Preceded by: Karel Kühnl
- Succeeded by: Vlasta Parkanová

Permanent Representative of the Czech Republic to NATO
- In office 1 September 2012 – 5 August 2019
- President: Václav Klaus; Miloš Zeman
- Preceded by: Martin Povejšil
- Succeeded by: Jakub Landovský

Personal details
- Born: 20 August 1963 (age 63) Prague, Czechoslovakia (now Czech Republic)
- Party: Independent
- Education: Charles University in Prague; King's College London

Jiří Šedivý (born 20 August 1963) is a Czech politician and diplomat.

Although not member of the Civic Democratic Party (ODS), Šedivý has served in various ministerial positions in ODS-led governments. Specifically, he served as Minister of Defence (September 2006 – January 2007) and as Deputy Minister for European Affairs (January–August 2007) under Prime Minister Mirek Topolánek, and again as Deputy Minister of Defence (November 2010 – August 2012) under Prime Minister Petr Nečas.

In September 2007, he became the highest-ranking Czech in NATO's history when he became the Assistant Secretary General for Defence Policy and Planning.

Šedivý also served as Permanent Representative of the Czech Republic to NATO, between September 2012 and July 2019.

On 1 September 2019, Šedivý was appointed by the Czech Ministry of Foreign Affairs as special envoy for resilience and new threats in the fight against misinformation and hostile influence of foreign powers.

He was educated at Jan Neruda Grammar School, Charles University in Prague and King's College London (MA War Studies, 1994).

From 2004 to 2006, Šedivý taught in security studies at the George C. Marshall European Center for Security Studies. Between 1999 and 2004, he was Director of the Institute of International Relations in Prague.

On 5 March 2020 the Steering Board of the European Defence Agency appointed Jiří Šedivý as new EDA Chief Executive upon recommendation of the Head of the European Defence Agency Josep Borrell. He will take office in April 2020.

Born in Prague, he is the son of historian and politician Jaroslav Šedivý who served as Foreign Affairs Minister under Prime Ministers Václav Klaus and Josef Tošovský.

He and his wife, Lucie, have a son.
