= 2026 Czech municipal elections =

- 9–10 October 2026

All 61 677 seats in municipal councils
- Turnout: 48.00%
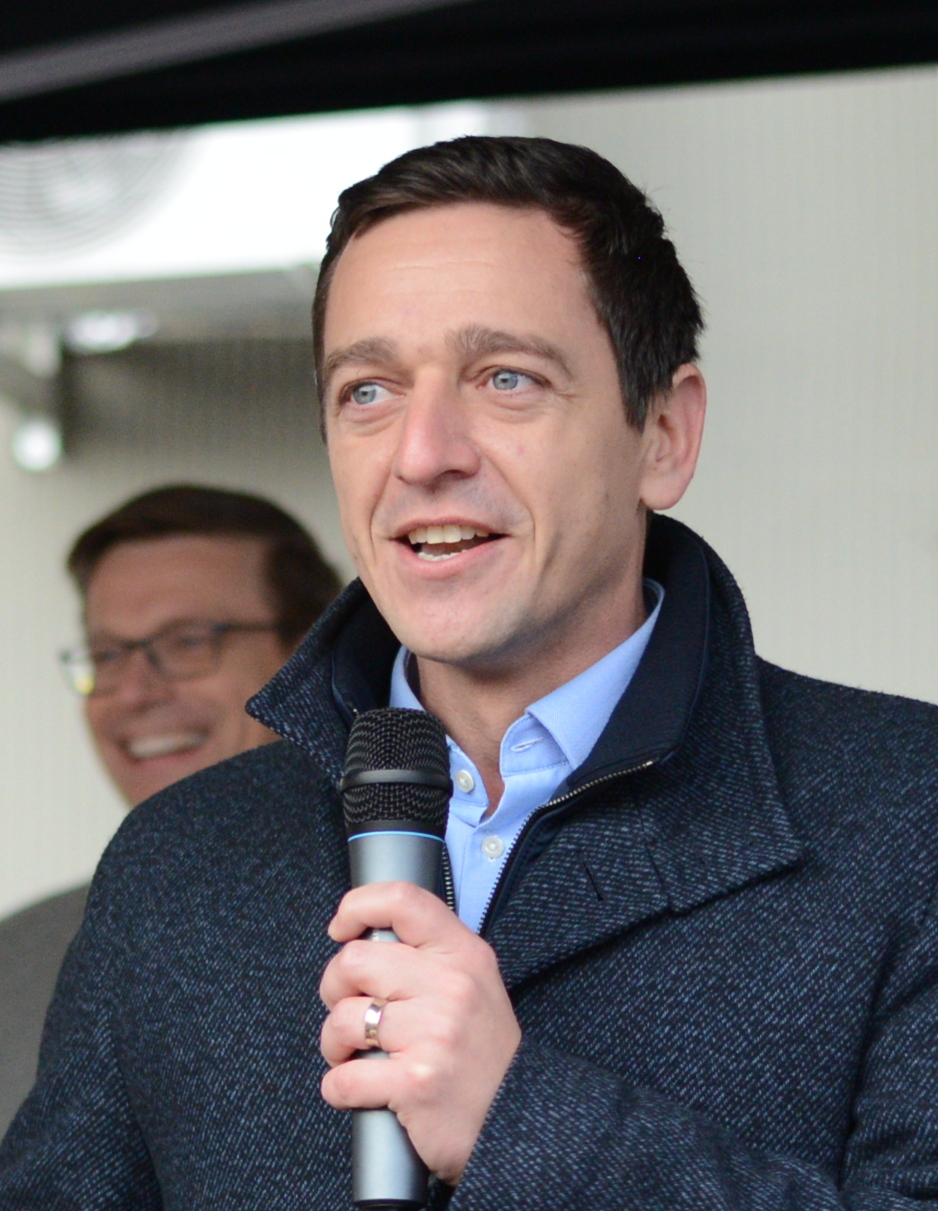

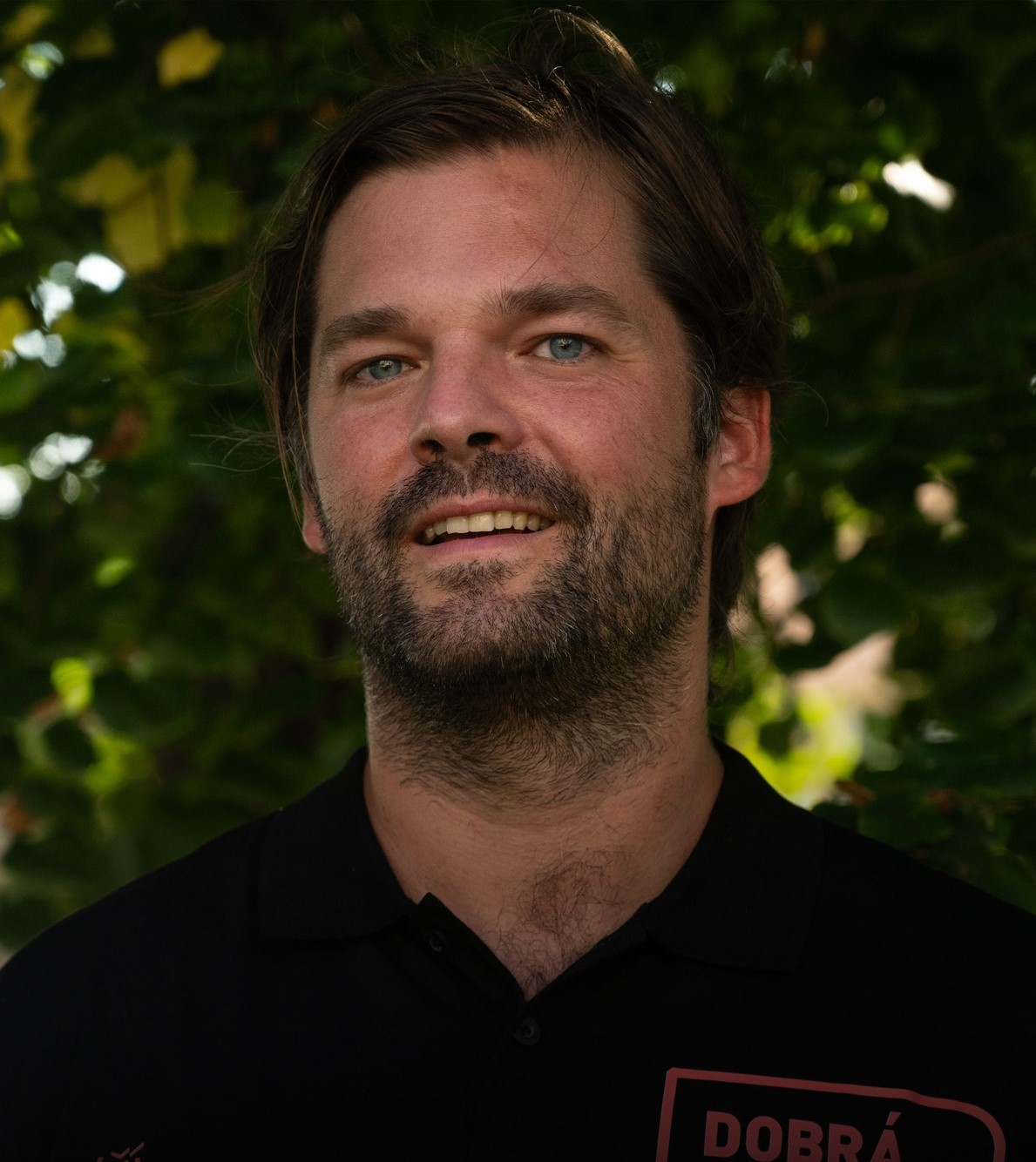

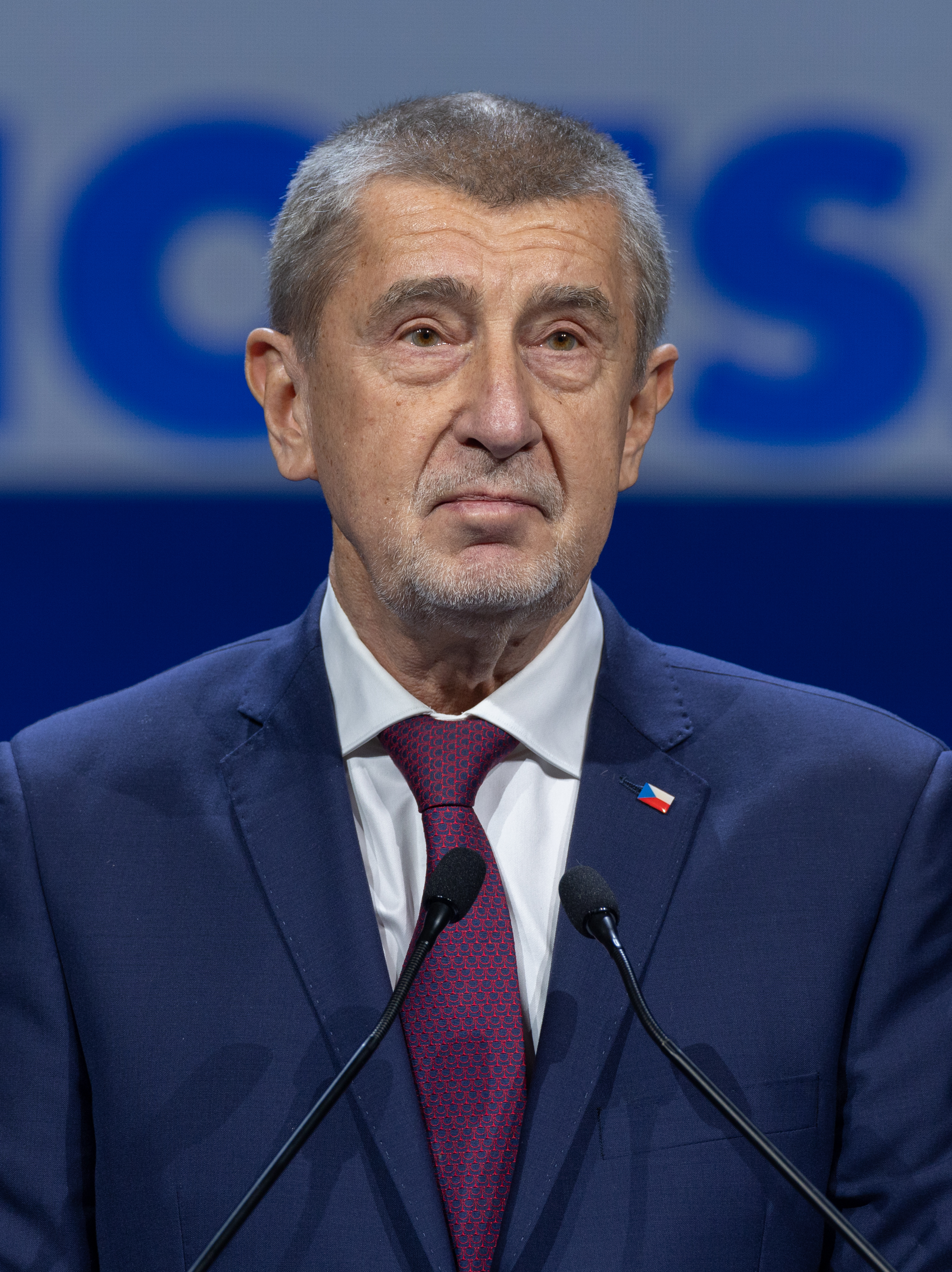

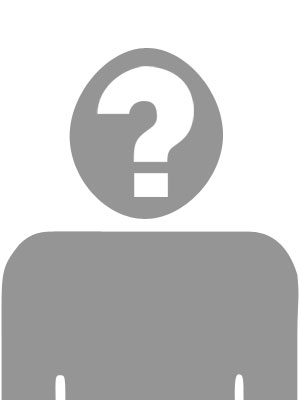
| | First party | Second party | Third party |
|---|---|---|---|
| Leader | Jan Grolich | Vít Rakušan | Martin Kupka |
| Party | KDU-ČSL | STAN | ODS |
| Last election | 3,252 seats | 1,854 seats | 2,294 seats |
| Seats won | 2,722 | 1,810 | 1,721 |
| Seat change | ▼530 | ▼44 | ▼573 |
| Popular vote | 5,206,682 | 12,353,610 | 12,743,154 |
| Percentage | 4.68% | 11.10% | 11.45% |
| | Fourth party | Fifth party | Sixth party |
| Leader | Jiří Nedvěd | Andrej Babiš | Matěj Ondřej Havel |
| Party | SOCDEM | ANO | TOP 09 |
| Last election | 799 seats | 1,748 seats | 428 seats |
| Seats won | 220 | 1,650 | 326 |
| Seat change | ▼579 | ▼98 | ▼102 |
| Popular vote | 540,416 | 15,885,194 | 4,173,903 |
| Percentage | 0.49% | 14.27% | 3.75% |

The 2026 Czech municipal elections were held on 9 and 10 October 2026, along with elections for one-third of the Senate.

== Result ==
| Party | Seats |
|---|---|
| KDU-ČSL | 2,722 |
| Mayors and Independents | 1,810 |
| Civic Democratic Party | 1,721 |
| ANO 2011 | 1,650 |
| TOP 09 | 326 |
| Czech Social Democratic Party | 220 |
| Independents | 209 |
| Czech Pirate Party | 199 |
| Non-Partisans | 176 |
| Our Czechia | 170 |
| Freedom and Direct Democracy | 166 |
| SNK European Democrats | 153 |
| Mayors for the Liberec Region | 151 |
| Green Party | 127 |
| Local Movements of Independents for Harmonic Development of Municipalities and Towns | 112 |
| Communist Party of Bohemia and Moravia | 94 |
| Prague City Party Prague Itself | 84 |
| Svobodní | 77 |
| Health Sports Education | 53 |
| Ostravak | 48 |
| Us | 48 |
| East Bohemians | 44 |
| South Bohemians 2012 | 41 |
| Choice for the City | 40 |
| Moravané | 39 |
| Coexistentia | 33 |
| Mayors and Personalities for Moravia | 33 |
| Mayors for Citizens | 30 |
| SEN 21 | 29 |
| Stačilo! | 29 |
| Law, Respect, Expertise | 28 |
| Freeholder Party of the Czech Republic | 26 |
| Přísaha | 25 |
| Better North | 25 |
| Better City, Better Life | 25 |
| For Pilsen | 24 |
| VOK – Choice for Region | 24 |
| ProMost | 24 |
| Citizens of Opava districts | 24 |
| Our City F-M | 20 |
| Motorists for Themselves | 20 |
| Other movements and parties | 694 |
| Independents | 50,084 |
Volby.gov.cz

== See also ==
- 2026 Prague municipal election
