= December 2021 Czech Social Democratic Party leadership election =

2021 ČSSD leadership election
- 10 December 2021
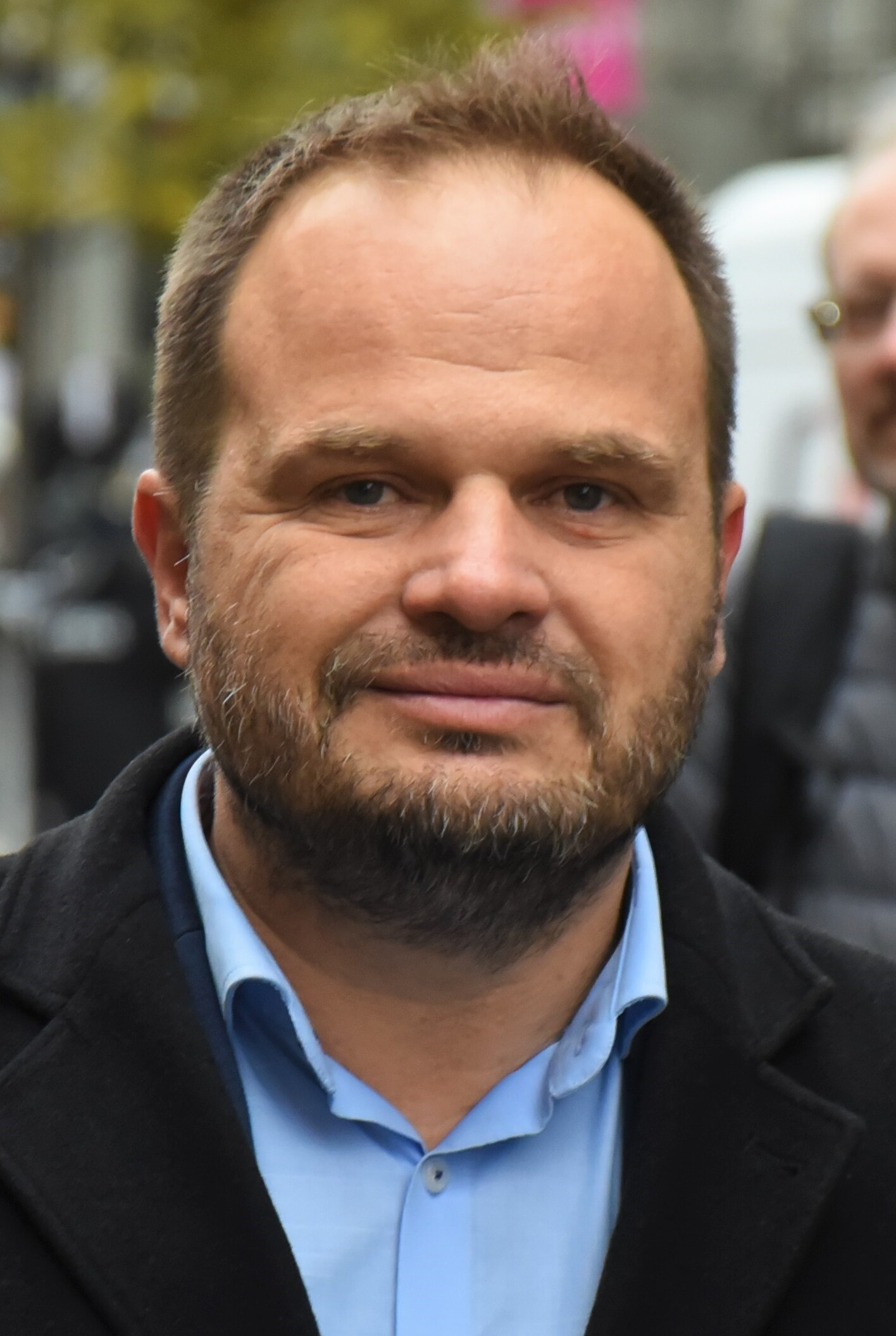

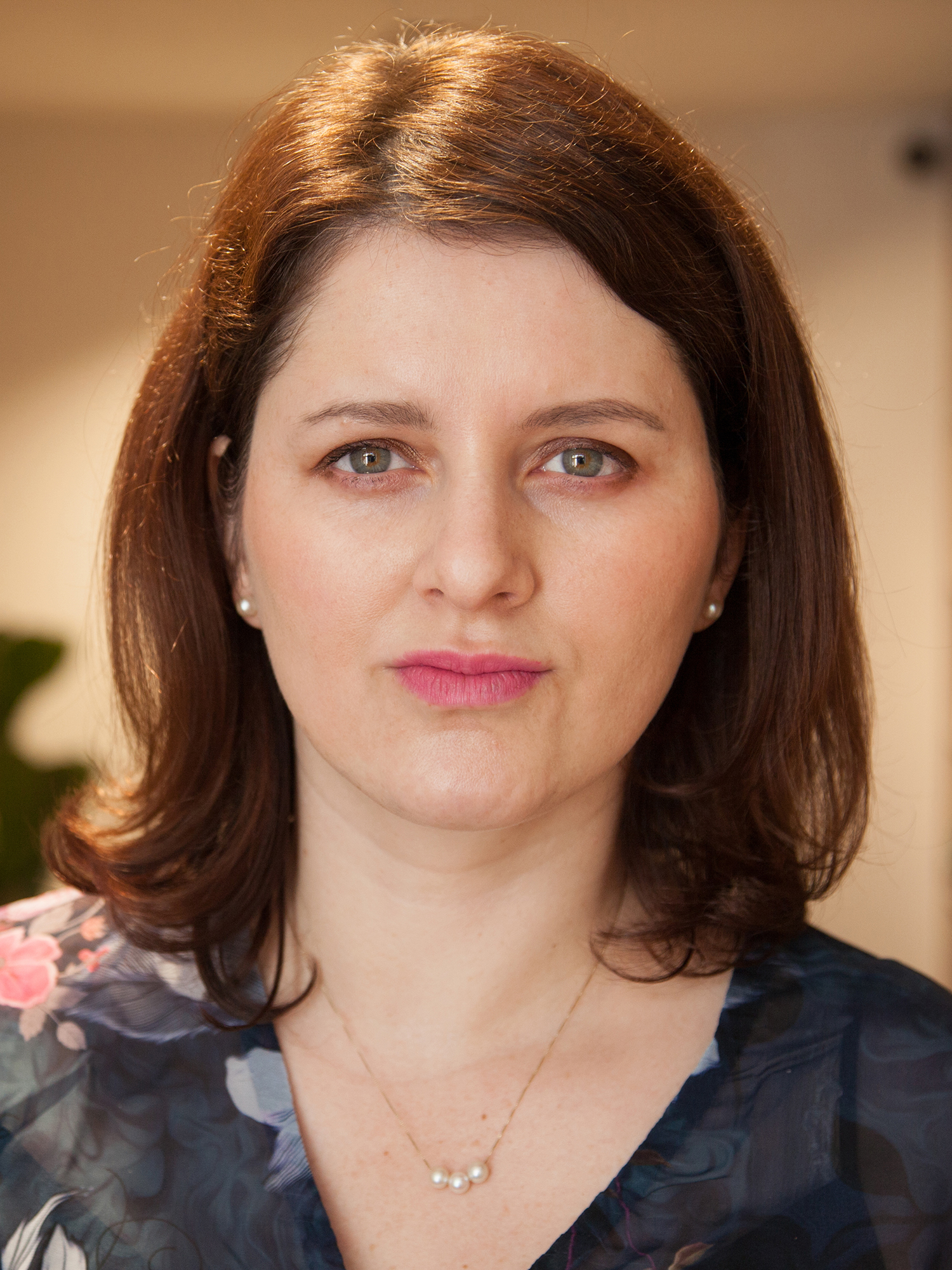

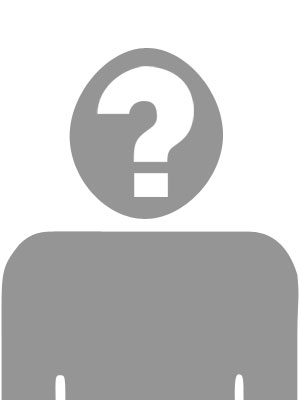
Candidate	Michal Šmarda	Jana Maláčová	Miroslav Krejčík
Electoral vote	130	62	41
Percentage	55.8%	26.6%	17.6%
Leader of ČSSD before election
Jan Hamáček
Elected Leader of ČSSD
Michal Šmarda

A leadership election for the Czech Social Democratic Party (ČSSD) was held on 10 December 2021 following party's defeat in the 2021 Czech legislative election. Incumbent leader Jan Hamáček declined to run for another term. Michal Šmarda was elected the new leader.

== Background ==
ČSSD participated in 2021 Czech legislative election. It received only 4.65% votes and lost all its seats in the Chamber of Deputies. Leader Jan Hamáček announced he would resign as a result. Hamáček officially resigned on 25 October 2021. Date for leadership election was set on 10 December 2021. Minister of Labour and Social Affairs Jana Maláčová announced her candidacy on the same day. Jan Jukl announced his candidacy on 26 October 2021. Michal Šmarda announced his candidacy on 1 November 2021. He stated that he wants to create a believable team to lead the party. He gained support of Tomáš Petříček and Martin Netolický Šmarda was endorsed by Vysočina Regional organisation. On 9 November 2021 Jana Turoňová announced her candidacy. On 29 November 2021 it was announced that Miroslav Krejčík, Jaromír Landsman and Petr Jaďuď are also running.

On 8 December 2021 Prague organisation endorsed Maláčová.

== Candidates ==
- Petr Jaďuď, Economist.
- Jan Jukl, Director of Polička Library.
- Miroslav Krejčík, former Chief of military Intelligence.
- Jaromír Landsman, member of Pardubice organisation.
- Jana Maláčová, Minister of Labour and Social Affairs in Andrej Babiš' Second Cabinet.
- Michal Šmarda, Mayor of Nové Město na Moravě.
- Jana Turoňová, Member of Law Commission.

=== Potential ===
- Martin Netolický, Governor of Pardubice Region was heavily speculated as candidate but he declined to run when he was asked by press following 2021 Czech legislative election which didn't stop speculations about his candidacy. He eventually supported Šmarda.
- Jiří Paroubek former party leader and former Prime Minister of the Czech Republic expressed interest but as a party non-member he is ineligible to run.

== Voting ==
Voting was held on 10 December 2021. Jaďuď, Jukl, Landsman and Turoňová withdrawn from the election. 233 delegates voted. 130 delegates voted for Šmarda. Maláčová received 62 votes and Krejčík 41.

Candidate	Vote	%
Michal Šmarda	133	55.79
Jana Maláčová	62	26.61
Miroslav Krejčík	41	17.60
