= Daniel Sterzik =

Czech politician (born 1981)

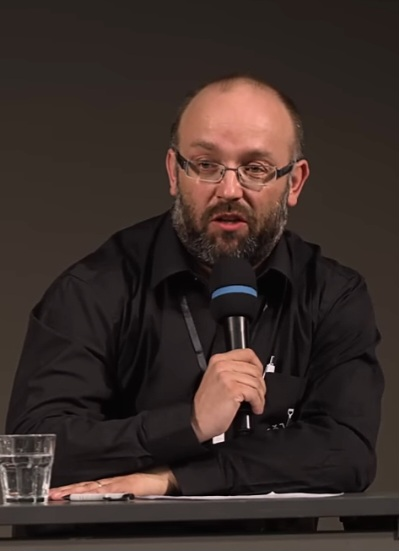
- Sterzik in 2025

Chairman of Stačilo!
- In office 4 March 2025 – 1 April 2026
- Preceded by: Position established
- Succeeded by: TBA

Personal details
- Born: 17 March 1981 (age 45) Sokolov, Czechoslovakia
- Party: Stačilo! (since 2024)
- Occupation: Blogger, politician
- Website: www.vidlakovykydy.cz

Daniel Sterzik (born 17 March 1981) is a Czech political activist who was the founding chair of Stačilo! from 4 March 2025 to 1 April 2026. He is also a blogger under the pseudonym of Vidlák (lit. 'Redneck') and has been discussed in the media as a spreader of disinformation.
