= Ondřej Dostál =

Czech politician (born 1979)

Ondřej Dostál MEP
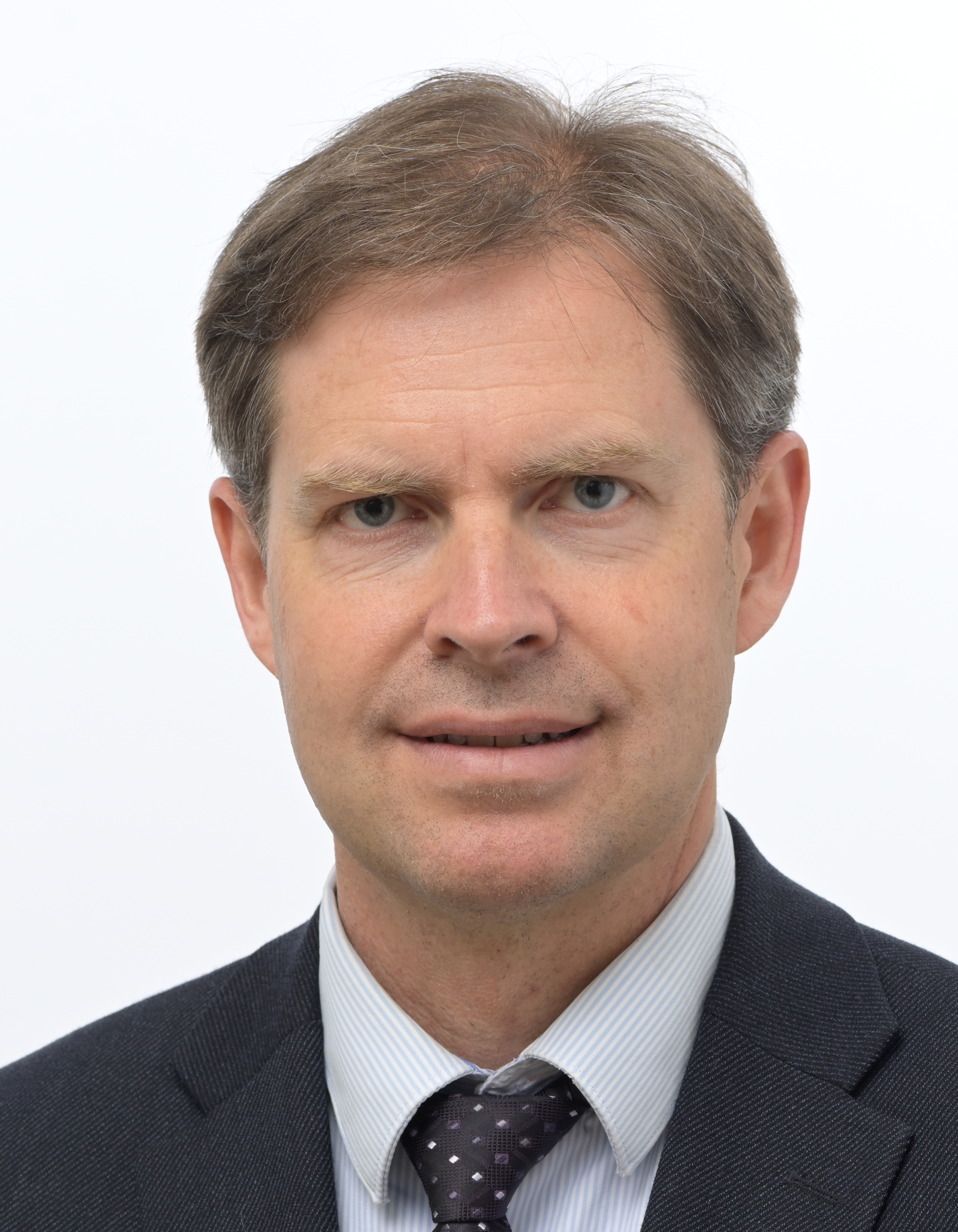
- Official portrait, 2024

Member of the European Parliament
- Incumbent
- Assumed office 16 July 2024
- Constituency: Czech Republic

Personal details
- Born: 25 January 1979 (age 47) Chomutov, Czechoslovakia
- Party: Stačilo! (since 2025)
- Other political affiliations: Pirates (2021–2022); SD-SN (2024–2025)
- Children: 3
- Education: Charles University

Ondřej Dostál (born 25 January 1979) is a Czech lawyer and politician who was elected as a member of the European Parliament in 2024. He was the 1st vice-chair of Stačilo! from 2025 to 2026.

== Early life and career ==
Dostál was born in Chomutov, and later moved to Rokycany and Mirošov. He graduated from the Faculty of Law, Charles University, before studying in Austria and the United States. A lawyer specializing in health insurance law, Dostál received the Lawyer of the Year award in 2006 and has been teaching at Charles University since 2003. In 2008, he was the defense lawyer for Třebíč Hospital in a case concerning baby-swapping.

== Political career ==
Dostál was a member of the Czech Pirate Party between 2021 and 2022. He was part of the Pirates and Mayors government team until resigning in December 2021, stating that their values had shifted away from his own. Dostál considers himself a classical liberal, advocating for less government control. In spring 2023, he spoke at anti-government demonstrations organized by Jindřich Rajchl.

In July 2025, Dostál traveled to Moldova to take part in the "Make Europe Great Again" conference but had his diplomatic passport seized and was expelled from the country.

At the Stačilo! congress in April 2026, Dostál was not elected to the movement's new board.
