= Jakub Landovský =

Czech politician (born 1976)

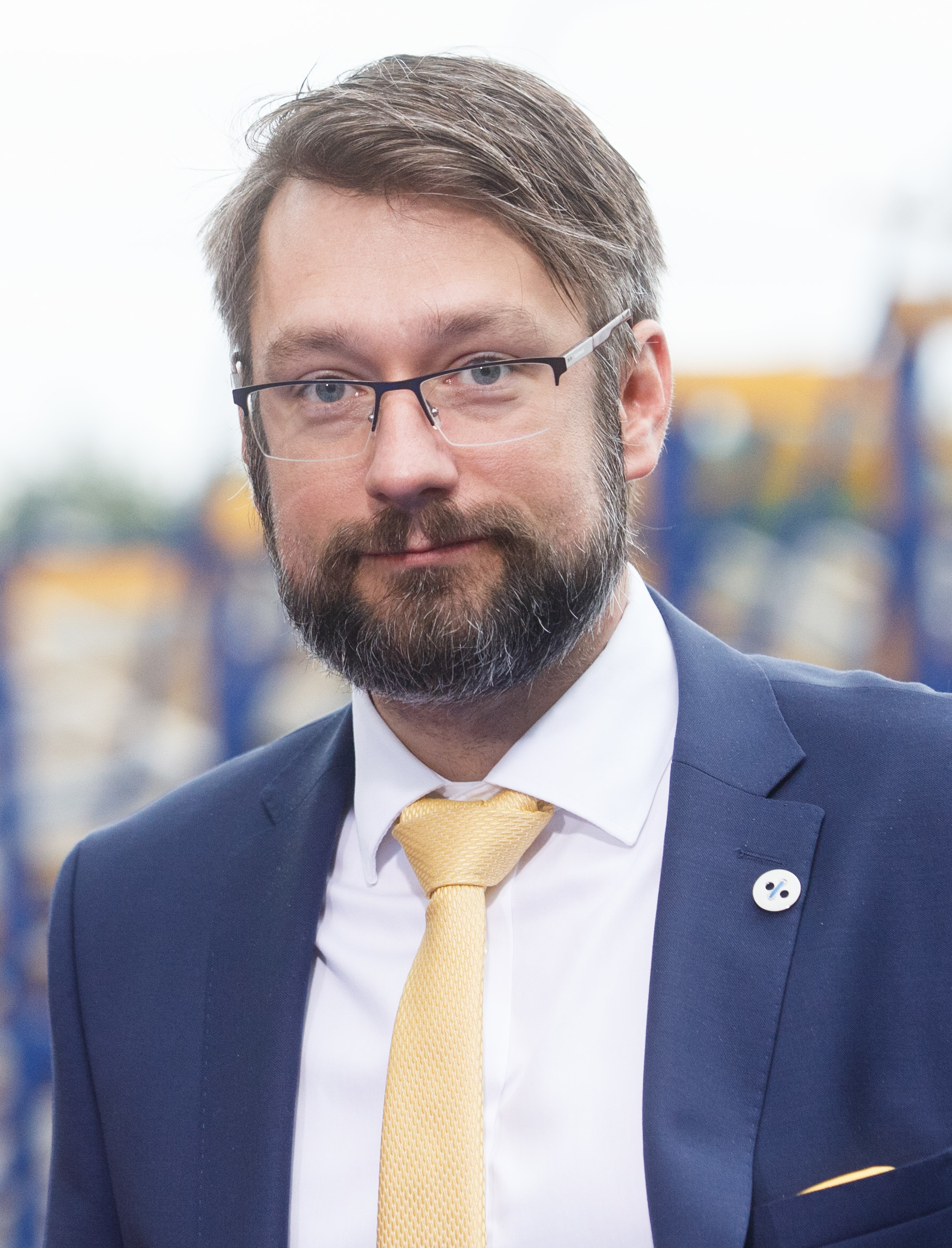

Czech Ambassador to NATO
- In office 5 August 2019 – 31 July 2024
- Preceded by: Jiří Šedivý
- Succeeded by: David Konecký

Deputy Minister of Defense
- In office 2 March 2015 – 5 August 2019
- Preceded by: Jiří Šedivý

Personal details
- Born: Jakub Landovský; 5 September 1976 (age 50) Prague, Czechoslovakia
- Party: ČSSD (2006 – 2024)
- Children: 3
- Education: Charles University; University of West Bohemia

Jakub Landovský (born 5 September 1976) is a Czech politician, lawyer, and university lecturer, who served as the Czech ambassador to NATO (2019-2024) and Deputy Minister of Defense (2015-2019). He was a member of the Czech Social Democratic Party from 2006 to 2024.

== Early life and education ==
Jakub Landovský was born in Prague on 5 September 1976.

From 1996 to 2003, he studied for a bachelor's and subsequently a master's degree at the Institute of Political Science of the Faculty of Social Sciences, Charles University. He completed his doctoral studies at the same faculty from 2003 to 2011, and passed the state exam in 2009. From 1999 to 2007 he attended the Faculty of Law of the University of West Bohemia in Plzeň, graduating with a master's degree.

Since 2014 he has been lecturing at the Faculty of Social Sciences at Charles University.

== Career ==
In 2000, Landovský started working at the Czech Ministry of Foreign Affairs as an assistant to the Special Rapporteur on Human Rights in the former Yugoslavia Jiří Dienstbier. From 2002 until 2005, he was an assistant ambassador with a special mission. From 2005 to 2006, he worked as a researcher at Oregon State University in the United States, and was briefly a consultant to the United Nations Development Program. From 2007 to 2010, he advised the chair of the Foreign Affairs Committee of the Chamber of Deputies, preparing analysis and background materials.

He joined ČSSD in 2006. In February 2012, together with Jiří Dienstbier Jr., he published "Živá socdem", which criticized the clientelist activities of the Prague branch of ČSSD.

In 2014, he became an adviser to the Deputy Minister of Defence, preparing analyses of the ministry's legislative proposals and acting on behalf of the Deputy Minister of Defense.

On 2 March 2015, Landovský was appointed Deputy Minister of Defence, working with Martin Stropnický to manage the Defence Policy and Strategy Section. He also worked for the Czech Ministry of Defence under ministers Karla Šlechtová and Lubomír Metnar.

In the municipal elections in 2018, he was ČSSD's lead candidate for Prague City Council, and therefore also the party's candidate for the Mayor of Prague. However, the party did not qualify for representation on the council, and Landovský also failed to be elected in Prague 1.

On 5 August 2019, he left the position of Deputy Minister of Defence and became the new Czech ambassador to NATO, replacing Jiří Šedivý.

In October 2024, after the Social Democracy leadership election, Landovský left the party due to disagreement with its new direction.

== Personal life ==
Landovský is married and has three children. In his spare time, he enjoys road cycling and basketball. He is a member of the Czech Bar Association and the Council for International Relations. He is the son of the artist and dissident Pavel Landovský.
