= Jan Neruda Grammar School =

Coordinates: 50.084238°N 14.405184°E

- Czech: Gymnázium Jana Nerudy
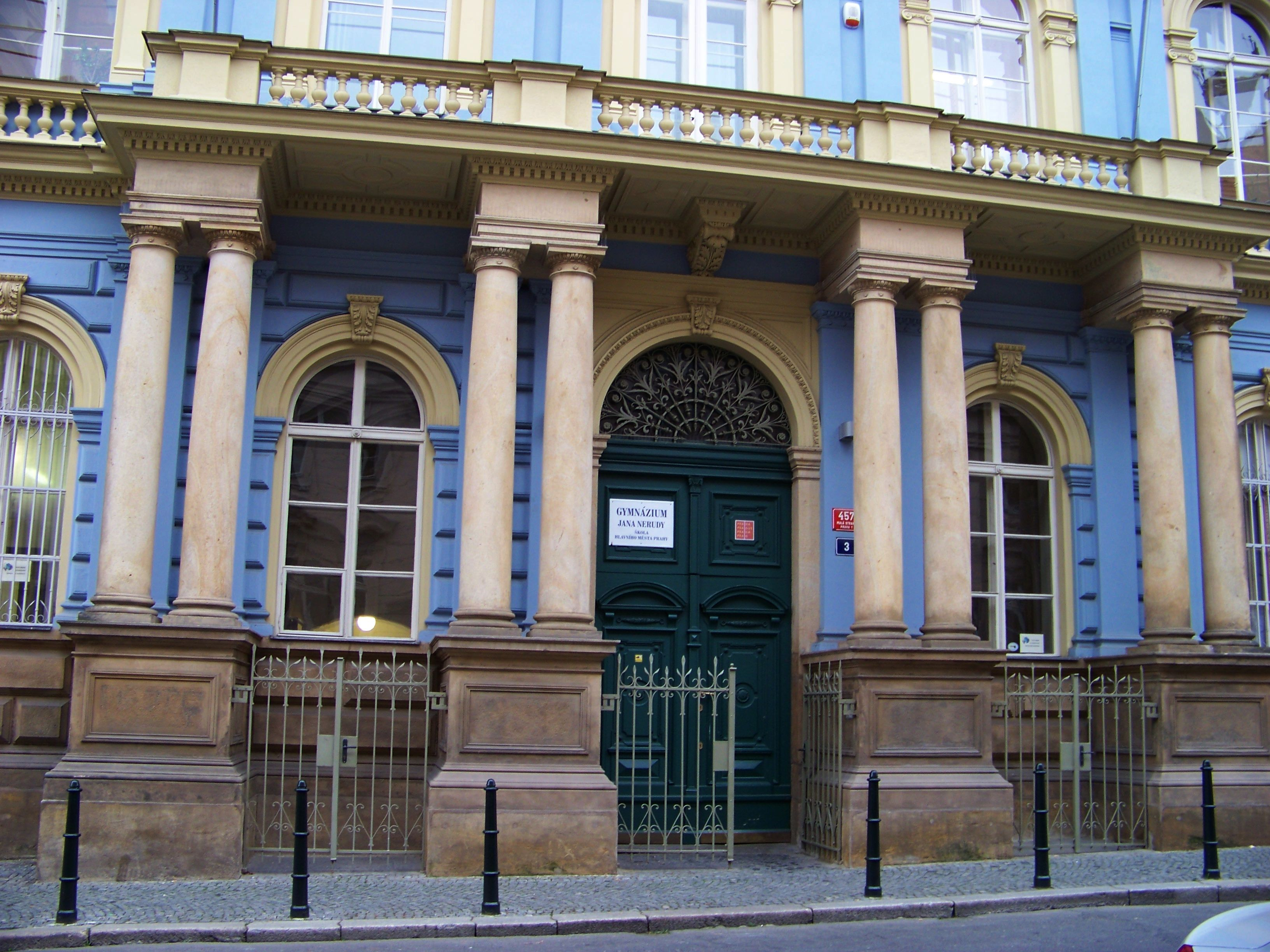

Location
- Hellichova 3/457; Prague, 252 07; Czech Republic

Information
- Established: 1865
- Authority: Capital city of Prague
- Acting headteacher: RNDr. Jaromír Kekule, Ph.D

Jan Neruda Grammar School (Czech: Gymnázium Jana Nerudy) is a Czech state secondary school situated in Prague. It is named after the writer Jan Neruda.

The school ranks as the second best secondary (high) school, and the best public (state, i.e. attended for free) secondary school in the Czech Republic according to the Czech Ministry of Education, based on the performance of students/graduates at the Maturita (A-level equivalent).

== Description ==
The grammar school is located on Hellichova Street in Prague. Jan Neruda Grammar School offers two courses of study: bilingual (French-Czech) and general (there used to be two general courses, science and humanities, although the difference between the two courses was marginal compared to the Anglo-Saxon education system; recently, these two courses have been merged). In the first and second years bilingual-course students are taught in Czech, but from the third year most subjects (apart from languages, fine arts and sports) are taught in French. It takes 6 years to complete the Grammar school. The staff of the Grammar school consists of about 65 teachers. Between 1996 and 2012 the school offered also a separate course consisting of general subjects and extensive music lessons for musically talented students in a different building located on Komenského Square (nowadays an unrelated institution with its own headmaster). The Grammar school is a member of the ASPnet UNESCO network. The school building is barrier-free.

== Subjects and activities ==
The structure of the course reflects the Czech national curriculum and consists of following subjects:

Compulsory subjects:

- Czech – Czech and world literature, Czech writing, Czech grammar
- English
- German or French
- Mathematics
- Physics
- Chemistry
- Biology/Geology
- History – Czech and world history, including modern history
- Social sciences – psychology, philosophy, sociology, political science, law, economics
- Geography
- IT
- Latin/Descriptive geometry
- Music – singing, playing instruments, history of music, theory
- Arts – creative lessons
- Physical education
- Methodology of thesis

Various elective and optional subjects, e.g.:

- Literature seminar
- Humanities
- Biology seminar
- History seminar
- Chemistry seminar
- History of arts

The school offers many activities for students: sports (weekly training sessions of various sports, regular weekend or week-long courses – skiing, canoeing, cycling, climbing, ski mountaineering, windsurfing, cross-country skiing etc.), languages (Spanish, Russian, Japanese), photography course, drama course, choir, discussion club, EYP and UN delegations, excursions (history, arts, technical, biology, psychology/psychiatry, law, charities), group psychology sessions, competitions (mathematics, cipher challenge, physics, astronomy, music, discussion, poetry reciting, presenting, chess, Latin, French conversation), lectures, cultural events (theatre, cinema, classical music concerts), virtual company trade fair (business-presenatation skills, second year students), reduced-price theatre tickets, student-run festivals and events, and many other projects, pop-up events and activities.

The school has an extended network of foreign schools (France, Belgium, Germany, Switzerland, Britain) and students are expected to participate in student exchanges that are provided every year.

The school organises a skiing course for students in their second year (Czech national curriculum), a teambuilding course for the first-year students, a skiing-language course in the third year, and a canoeing or cycling/climbing course in the fourth year. These courses are a fixed part of the school year.

The school and its students contribute to several charity organisations.

== Administration ==
After the death of PhDr. Zuzana Wienerová in 2026, she was replaced temporarily by her deputy headmaster PhDr. Jaromír Kekule, PhD. A competition for the permanent position was announced permanent position of the headmaster was announced

== History ==
Jan Neruda Grammar School is one of the oldest grammar schools in the Czech Republic. It was founded in 1865, although not in the contemporary building which has been occupied since 1876. The original name of the school was Malostranské gymnázium (Malá Strana Grammar School).

== Graduates of note ==
Among hundreds of well-known graduates of the school there are:

- Bohumil Bydžovský – academic
- Bohuslava Kecková – the first Czech female doctor
- Jaromír Hanzlík – actor
- Jan Patočka – professor and philosopher
- Jiří Paroubek – a former Czech Prime Minister and prominent politician
- Jiří Šedivý – Defence Minister
- Radim Palouš – professor
- Jan Tříska – actor
- Vladislav Vančura – writer
- Josef Dostál - canoeist
