= Moravané =

Moravians Moravané
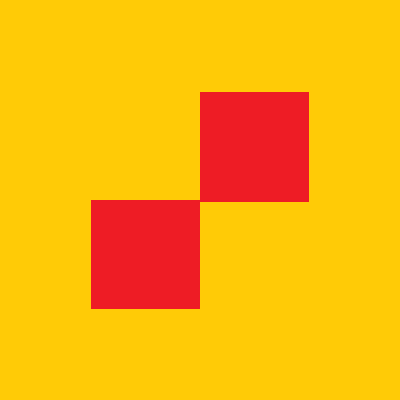
- Leader: Aleš Sekanina
- Founded: 1994
- Headquarters: Malinovského náměstí 603/4, Brno
- Ideology: Autonomism; Regionalism; Federalism; Euroscepticism
- Political position: Centre
- National affiliation: Stačilo! (since 2025)
- European affiliation: European Free Alliance (until 2018)
- Colours: yellow, red

Website
- www.moravane.cz

Moravané (Czech: [ˈmoravanɛː], lit. 'Moravians') is a small non-parliamentary political party in Moravia in the Czech Republic.

== History ==
It arose in 2005 through a merger of two older local parties: Hnutí samosprávné Moravy a Slezska – Moravské národní sjednocení ("The Movement of Autonomous Moravia and Silesia - Moravian National Union") and Moravská demokratická strana ("the Moravian Democratic Party"). Pavel Dohnal became the party chairman. The party first participated in the nationwide parliamentary election in June 2006 and won 0.23% of the national popular vote, falling below the minimum threshold to gain any seats. Moravané was a member party of the European Free Alliance until 2018. A youth wing of the party (Mladí Moravané - Young Moravians) also operates.

In March 2009, party leadership passed to Jiří Novotný.

== Ideology ==
The main goal of the party is as follows: "On the principle of the right of self-determination of the Moravian nation, Moravané advocates for the independence of Moravia via restoration of the Moravian legislative parliament within the territorial scope of the Moravian ecclesiastical province." The party strongly disfavours state centralism, and expresses anti-Czech (Bohemian) sentiment; "Prague" (both the city and Czech government) is blamed for "suppressing Moravian culture, traditions and language" and for "pauperising of Moravia".

According to Moravané, the future of the Europe lies in dismantling the modern European nation-states and establishing new states on historical territorial boundaries. Moreover, the party supports the codification and recognition of the Moravian language, traditionally considered a dialect of Czech by linguists and the public.

== Activities ==
The party organises open air actions, meetings and sit-ins, "candle marches" (founded at 2005) in Brno and Olomouc, "pilgrimages to the Morava river spring", demonstrations against "Bohemiazation" etc.

During a 'candle march' on 27 February 2010, forty party members decorated with numerous Moravian flags marched through the historical part of Brno to the pre-war Moravian Diet building, which Moravané claims to be occupied by a "foreign state", and the Moravian Square. The protest was poorly received by passers-by, with one on-looker noting "at this rate, the [Moravian people] will be looked on as fools". The march was not registered with the police and was later halted. On 25 July 2010, Moravané participated in a demonstration in Moravský Krumlov to attempt to halt a collection of Alfons Mucha paintings named The Slav Epic from being returned to Prague.

== Election results ==
=== European Parliament ===
Election	List leader	Votes	%	Seats	+/−	EP Group
2024*	Ctirad Musil	3,912	0.13 (#23)	0 / 21	New	−

*Note: In the 2024 EP elections, the party ran on a joint ticket with the Association for the Republic – Republican Party of Bohemia, Moravia and Silesia.

=== Local elections ===
Election	Votes	%	Seats	+/–
2026	22,109	0.02	39 / 62,178	
