= April 2021 Czech Social Democratic Party leadership election =

2021 ČSSD leadership election
- 9 April 2021
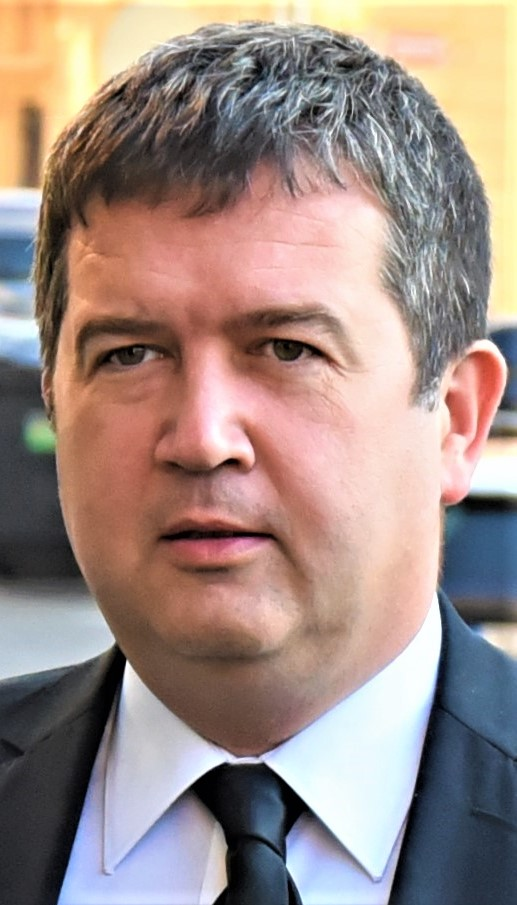

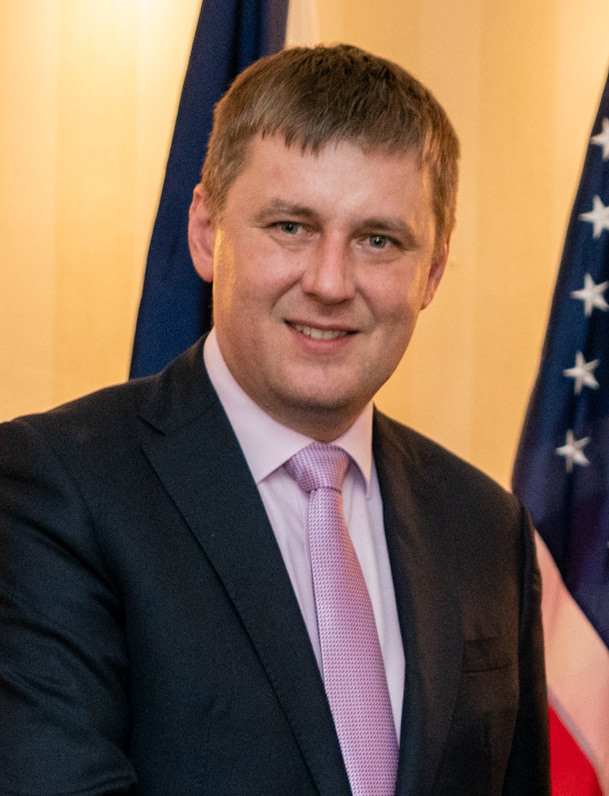

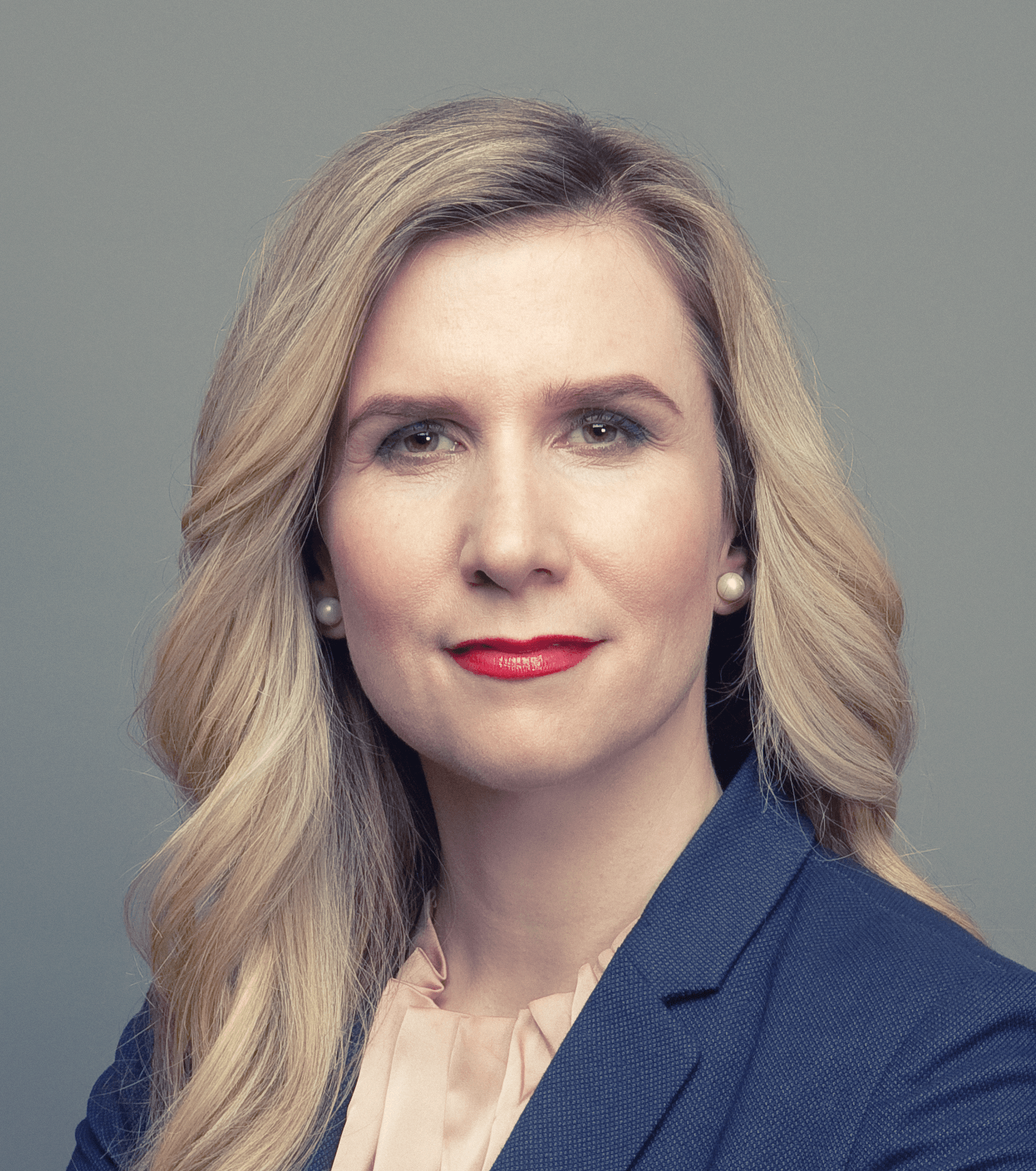
Candidate	Jan Hamáček	Tomáš Petříček	Kateřina Valachová
Electoral vote	140	95	23
Percentage	51.9%	35.2%	8.5%
Leader of ČSSD before election
Jan Hamáček
Elected Leader of ČSSD
Jan Hamáček

A leadership election for the Czech Social Democratic Party (ČSSD) was held on 9 April 2021. Jan Hamáček was reelected as party leader.

== Background ==
Jan Hamáček was elected leader of the party in 2018 following devastating defeat in 2017 legislative election. He was reelected in 2019. Under Hamáček's leadership ČSSD didn't stop its fall and suffered heavy defeat in 2020 regional and senate elections being reduced to 37 regional seats and 3 senate seats.

Hamáček stated that consequences of party's defeat will be decided in January 2021 when party has a congress during which leadership election is held. He himself didn't rule out standing stating that he will decide in January 2021. Election was initially scheduled for January 2021 but due to COVID-19 pandemic in the Czech Republic was postponed to 9 April 2021.

On 15 February 2021 Minister of Foreign Affairs Tomáš Petříček announced his candidacy. He stated that ČSSD needs a new style and should look to the future. The incumbent leader Jan Hamáček stated that he isn't surprised by Petříček's candidacy. He himself stated that he would decide whether he will seek reelection after he finds out mood in regions. Governor of Pardubice region Martin Netolický endorsed Petříček stating that ČSSD need a to turn trend if it wants to win any seats in 2021 Czech legislative election. Other politicians who gave him support are Michal Šmarda and Milan Štěch. Petříček asked for support of Prague organisation but didn't receive it. Mayor of Brno Líšeň Břetislav Štefan announced candidacy on 20 February 2021. He was nominated by Brno-Country District organisation. Hamáček announced on 22 February 2021 that he will run for another term.

On 20 March 2021 6 regional organisations held meetings which also discussed leadership election. Hamáček received nomination from Vysočina region and Olomouc region. Petříček received nomination from Karlovy Vary region. On 24 March 2021 South Moravian regional organisation gave its nomination for the election to Štefan. On 25 March 2021 Central Bohemian regional organisation gave its nomination to Hamáček while Prague organisation endorsed Petříček. On 31 March 2021 former Minister of Education Kateřina Valachová announced her candidacy. On 8 April 2021 Štefan withdrawn from election and endorsed Petříček against Hamáček.

== Candidates ==
- Jan Hamáček, incumbent leader.
- Tomáš Petříček, Minister of Foreign Affairs.
- Kateřina Valachová, former Minister of Education.

=== Withdrawn ===
- Břetislav Štefan, Mayor of Brno-Líšeň.

== Opinion polls ==
Date	Agency	Jan Hamáček	Tomáš Petříček	Kateřina Valachová	Břetislav Štefan
8 April 2021	Phoenix Research	53%	23%	22%	4%

== Voting ==
Candidate	Vote	%
Jan Hamáček	140	51.9
Tomáš Petříček	95	35.2
Kateřina Valachová	23	8.5
