= Jiří Dolejš =

Czech politician (born 1961)

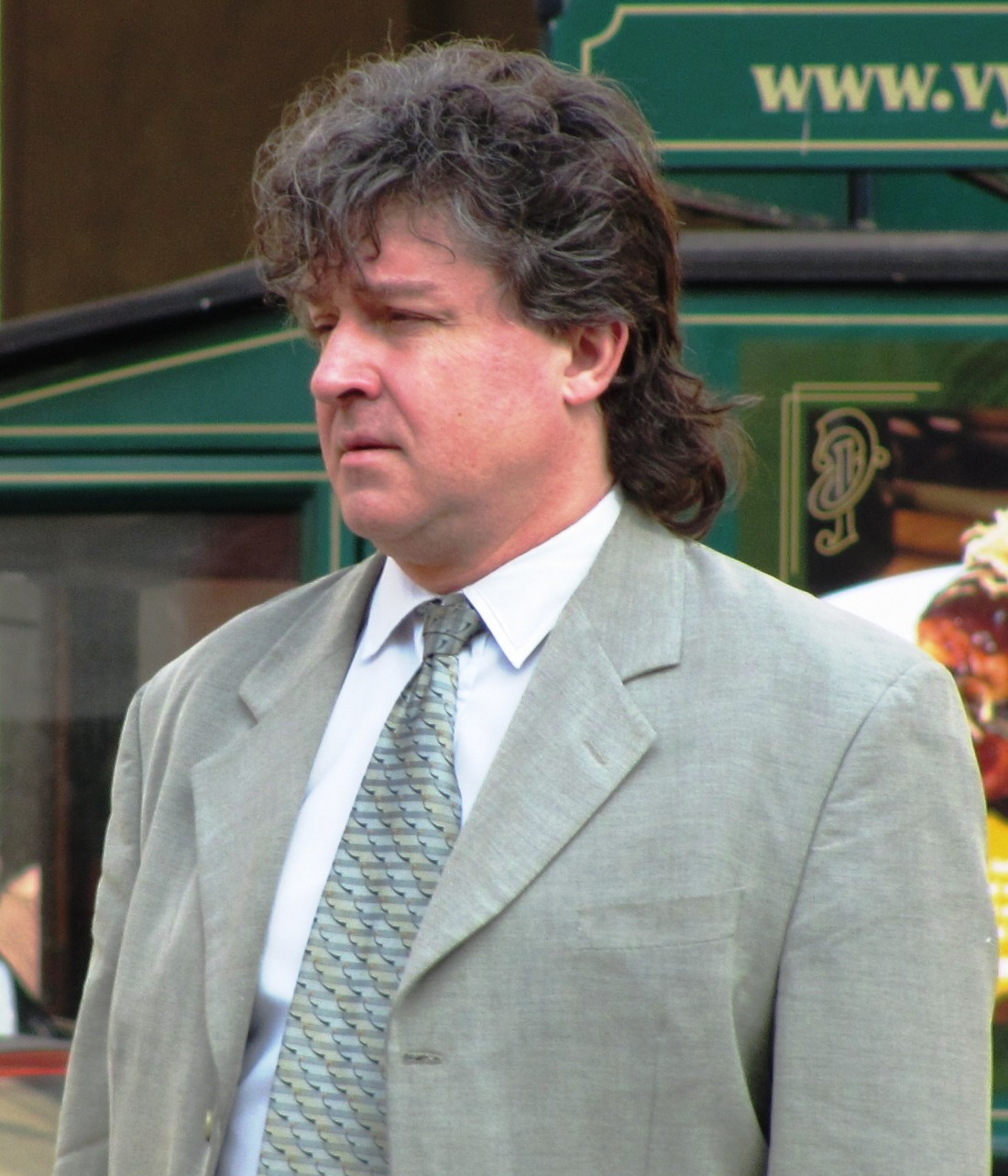

Member of the Chamber of Deputies
- In office 15 June 2002 – 28 August 2013
- In office 26 October 2013 – 21 October 2021

Personal details
- Born: 24 January 1961 (age 65) Prague, Czechoslovakia (now the Czech Republic)
- Party: KSČ (1989–1990); KSČM (1990–2025)
- Education: University of Economics, Prague

Jiří Dolejš (born 24 January 1961) is a Czech politician who was a member of the Chamber of Deputies of the Czech Republic from 2002 to October 2013 and from August 2013 to 2021.

He studied at the Faculty of Economics of the University of Economics in Prague. He graduated from there in 1984. From 1984 to 1990 he worked for the Prognostic Institute, later for the Czech Economic Policy Institute (1991–1992).

Dolejš was a member of the Communist Party of Bohemia and Moravia (KSČM) from 1990 until his expulsion in 2025, from 1993 to 1999 he was an employee of the Central Committee and in 1999 he became one of its deputy leaders.

In 2026, Dolejš expressed support for New Social Democracy, a new party formed as a breakaway faction from the old Czech Social Democratic Party.
