= 2019 Czech Social Democratic Party leadership election =

2019 ČSSD leadership election
- 1 March 2019
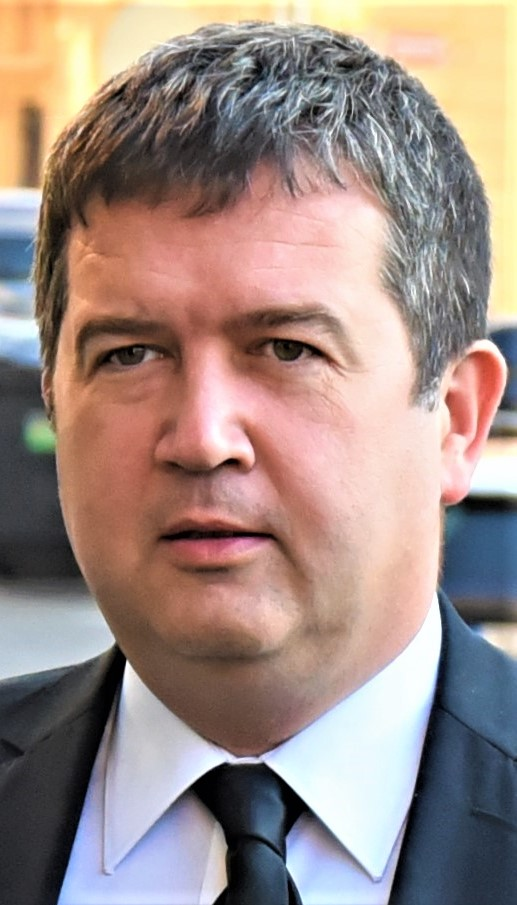
| Candidate | Jan Hamáček |
| Electoral vote | 433 |
| Percentage | 84.9% |
Leader of ČSSD before election
Jan Hamáček
Elected Leader of ČSSD
Jan Hamáček

A leadership election for the Czech Social Democratic Party (ČSSD) was held on 1 March 2019. The incumbent leader Jan Hamáček was elected for second term when he received 433 votes while 57 delegates voted against him and 11 abstained.

== Background ==
Jan Hamáček was elected party's leader in 2018 after its heavy defeat in 2017 election when Social Democrats fell to 7%. The party then suffered losses in 2018 Senate and municipal elections. Party's deputy Leader in Hamáček's rival in 2018 leadership election resigned on his deputy leader seat which led to speculation he could run against Hamáček.

Hamáček received nomination from Hradec Králové regional organisation on 24 November 2018. Pardubice regional organisation gave him its nomination on the same day. Jiří Zimola received nomination from Ostrava organisation on 11 December 2018.

Prague organisation held its meeting on 11 January 2019. It decided not to nominate Jan Hamáček. Karlovy Vary organisation gave its nomination to Hamáček on 26 January 2019.

== Candidates ==
- Jan Hamáček, the incumbent leader.
- Jaromír Landsman, member of the Party. Disqualified from election.

=== Speculative ===
- Jiří Zimola, his candidacy was speculated after his resignation on Deputy Leader position. On 25 November 2018 Zimola stated that he doesn't plan to run. He later said that he will run if he feels support within the party.
