= Stačilo! =

Political party and alliance in the Czech Republic

Enough! Stačilo!
- Chairman: Collective leadership
- Deputy Leaders: Pavlína Procházková; Michal Gulyáš; Jana Turoňová
- Founders: Kateřina Konečná (alliance); Daniel Sterzik (party)
- Founded: 4 December 2023 (electoral alliance); 10 October 2024 (political party)
- Headquarters: Politických vězňů 1531/9, Prague
- Membership (2025): 10
- Ideology: Left-wing populism Left-wing nationalism Social conservatism Euroscepticism
- Political position: Left-wing to far-left
- European Parliament group: Non-Inscrits (Note: Kateřina Konečná was a member of The Left in the European Parliament – GUE/NGL before the election.)
- Cooperating/list parties: KSČM; SOCDEM; ČSNS; SD-SN; Moravané
- Colours: Red
- Chamber of Deputies: 0 / 200
- Senate: 0 / 81
- European Parliament: 1 / 21 (Note: Ondřej Dostál, elected for SD-SN, has been a member of Stačilo! since March 2025.)
- Regional councils: 50 / 675
- Local councils: 393 / 61,677

Website
- stacilo.cz
- Politics of the Czech Republic; Political parties; Elections; A: The party is also described as left-conservative, given its more conservative stances on social issues.

Stačilo! ([ˈstatʃɪlo], lit. 'Enough!') is a political party in the Czech Republic. It was first announced as an electoral alliance on 4 December 2023 by Kateřina Konečná, leader of the Communist Party of Bohemia and Moravia (KSČM). The alliance consisted of KSČM, United Democrats – Association of Independents, the Czech National Social Party and independent individuals. On 10 October 2024, it transformed into a political party, founded by Daniel Sterzik, who was the party chairman from March 2025 to April 2026.

== History ==
=== 2024 European Parliament election ===
In November 2023, KSČM announced its intention to form a broad political alliance for the 2024 European Parliament elections, with the other members of the coalition to be announced in December.

KSČM leader Kateřina Konečná announced the coalition on 4 December 2023, stating that it had been initiated by KSČM "with the aim of uniting left-wing and patriotic parties and movements that are not indifferent to the position of the Czech Republic in the European Union, the practice of censorship, the waste of money on weapons or ineffective social policies leading to appalling differences in the minimum wage within the EU". The coalition's founding members were KSČM and SD-SN; Konečná was chosen as the lead candidate for the alliance's electoral list. Ondřej Dostál, a lawyer and former healthcare adviser to the Czech Pirate Party, was the lead candidate for the United Democrats.

In March 2024, the Czech National Social Party announced that it was joining the coalition. The leading ČSNS candidate on the list was chairman Michal Klusáček.

The coalition announced that it would participate in the European Parliament election in June 2024. Konečná suggested that the coalition could continue after the European elections.

In September 2024, the Slovak party Smer-SD began negotiations with Stačilo! and the German Bündnis Sahra Wagenknecht on establishing cooperation between left-wing conservative parties.

=== 2024 Czech regional elections ===
For the 2024 regional elections, the coalition submitted a joint list in 12 out of 13 contested regions, several of them in cooperation with other left-wing and nationalist parties, such as ČSSD or DOMOV. In the Ústí nad Labem Region, SOCDEM joined the coalition list, which was criticized by SOCDEM's leader Michal Šmarda. However, Šmarda refused to formally ban such a cooperation.

Stačilo! won representation in all contested regions except the Liberec Region, where it fell short of the threshold by just eight votes, and gained 40 regional councillors in total. The coalition demanded a recount of the votes in Liberec, which was approved by the Liberec Regional Court. However, although the recount found some counting errors, the court ruled that they had not affected the final result, and certified the election.

=== 2025 Czech parliamentary election ===
On 16 November 2024, the Communist Party renewed the coalition for the 2025 election. However, Stačilo! will formally run as a newly-created party instead of a coalition, in order to avoid the higher electoral threshold. The party was founded by Daniel Sterzik. Konečná said she would resign from the European Parliament if elected. At the same time, SOCDEM leader Jana Maláčová said she was in talks with the coalition about her party's participation in the coalition. However, some party members, as well as the Young Social Democrats, opposed cooperation with the communists and threatened to leave SOCDEM if it joined Stačilo!. Konečná stated that any party wishing to join the coalition would have to respect its fundamental demands, including a foreign agent law, referendums on the Czech Republic's exit from the European Union and NATO, and moving public media under direct state control.

It was confirmed that the Czech Sovereignty of Social Democracy, led by ex-PM Jiří Paroubek, was also in talks about joining the coalition, after widespread cooperation in the regional elections. However, ČSNS later vetoed the party's admission. Paroubek cited "multiple reasons", but did not specify any.

Přísaha's leader Robert Šlachta considered joining the coalition after the Motorists for Themselves withdrew from the coalition between the two parties. On 4 March 2025, Stačilo! formed as a party and established a leadership, with Daniel Sterzik as chair, Ondřej Dostál as 1st vice-chair, and Pavlína Procházková as vice-chair. Later in March 2025, the Moravané party announced cooperation with Stačilo!.

On 31 March 2025, it was announced that former MEP Jana Bobošíková would lead Stačilo! in the Central Bohemian Region. On 17 July 2025, the Stačilo! leadership agreed on cooperation with SOCDEM for the election. In September 2025, former Czech president and prime minister Miloš Zeman and former MP and Governor of the South Moravian Region Michal Hašek endorsed the party before the upcoming election.

In the 2025 Czech parliamentary election, the party won 4.3% of the vote, unexpectedly falling below the 5% electoral threshold necessary to win seats, despite some polls giving Stačilo! over 7% days before the election. Reacting to the results, Kateřina Konečná stated that Stačilo! would continue despite the defeat, hoping that "left-wing issues will find their representation in all future elections." The party chair Daniel Sterzik declared that he would discuss his position with the party's board. The former deputy chairman of KSČM, Jiří Dolejš, attributed the party's failure to a "forced merger with SOCDEM".

On 1 April 2026, a new party board was elected. Pavlína Procházková became the 1st vice-chair, Jana Turoňová and Michal Gulyáš became vice-chairs, and the other elected board members were Dana Kulichová, Vítek Prokop, and Jiří Medula. The party chair was not elected, and Daniel Sterzik and Ondřej Dostál did not defend their positions. In May 2026, Turoňová stated that the election of a party chair was not on the agenda, and that the movement's collective leadership was functioning effectively.

== Ideology and policies ==
Stačilo! describes itself as "left-wing and patriotic" and "the only relevant opposition". It has also been described as communist, nationalist and pro-Russian. The alliance has also been described as an attempt to avoid the controversial "communist" label and attract voters from the far-right. Michel Perottino of Charles University wrote of the party: "Stačilo! was presented in the Czech media as a sort of rebranding of the KSČM, aiming to effectively attract voters, even those rather frightened by the Communists. But in fact, as we will see, there are very few left from the original communist ideals or even their long-lasting program. On the contrary, it seems that the Party clearly turned from red to “brown,” becoming less leftist than nationalist." The coalition's list for the European Parliament election included several candidates accused of spreading disinformation during the COVID-19 pandemic; the movement as a whole has been labeled as "anti-system" and Eurosceptic.

The party's ideology comes from its founding member, KSČM, which has been "increasingly shifting towards conservative and nationalist positions, particularly in its criticism of the European Union, migration, and LGBT policies" since its defeat in the 2021 Czech parliamentary election. The slogans of Stačilo! include ‘Dictated to by Brussels? Enough!’, ‘No more green delirium, let’s protect nature with common sense’, ‘Equal and sovereign status for the Czech Republic in the EU’; ‘Preservation of the Czech crown’ and ‘Stop illegal migration’. Stačilo! is described as socially conservative; according to Czech political scientists Tomáš Cirhan and Mattia Collin, "Stačilo increasingly positioned itself not as a left-wing coalition but as an anti-establishment, nationalist, and radical right movement." It is considered to increasingly approach national-conservative values. Similarly, Marek Šťastna argued that "by abandoning purely left-wing communist politics and adopting issues that had previously been the exclusive domain of Freedom and Direct Democracy (SPD), the STAČILO! movement is moving closer to the Czech far right and thus to the SPD."

Economically, the party has been described as socialist. It calls for higher taxes on banks and large corporation, full nationalization of the ČEZ Group, a higher minimum wage, universal free healthcare, and state ownership of Czech resources – one of the party's slogans is "Czech lithium in Czech hands". It states that its main goal is to achieve "a functioning and self-sufficient economy" through securing the economic sovereignty of the Czech Republic, opposing European integration, preserving the Czech Koruna, pursuing partnerships with Russia and China, and fully nationalizing Czech infrastructure and strategic industries, especially the energy industry. Stačilo is protectionist, opposing outsourcing and advocating an end to "siphoning off profits abroad" and "profits evasion". Michal Ševčík wrote that "because of its opposition to social constructivism and the identitarian movement, Stačilo! can be described as a socially conservative coalition, and in terms of paternalism and redistributive measures, as market socialist, recognizing all types of ownership of the means of production with an emphasis on state ownership of strategic sectors of the economy and services with the aim to achieve energy security and the availability of healthcare, education, and basic services free of charge to all Czech citizens".

Konečná has named the abolition of the European Green Deal and reversal of the planned EU-wide ban on the sale of cars with combustion engines as priorities. She also pledged to cease the delivery of weapons to Ukraine, and called for the equalization of salaries across the whole European Union. Stačilo! also opposes the European Union Emissions Trading System, calling for an end to "green delirium"; it also supports the removal of all EU sanctions against Russia and Belarus, and the purchase of Russian natural gas by EU countries.

The party is considered pro-Russian. It argues that although Russia invaded Ukraine in 2014 and 2022, both attacks were caused by Ukraine itself and the West, which left Russia with no choice and made the invasion "understandable". It criticizes Ukraine for banning left-wing parties such as the Communist Party of Ukraine and states that Ukraine lacks "national legitimacy". Stačilo! considers the Russian claim to Donetsk, Luhansk and all Russian-speaking areas within the pre-2014 borders of Ukraine legitimate and would recognize them as belonging to the Russian Federation. The party also denounced Ukrainian refugees in the Czech Republic, arguing that they are responsible for violent crime and that they are economic immigrants that do not come from the war-torn areas of Ukraine. It also claims that Ukrainian immigrants disadvantage Czechs in the job market and that they are prioritized, stating that "Ukrainian citizens now hold positions that should be held by Czech citizens". In regards to War in Gaza, the party denounced Israel as "an occupier" and described the Czech-Israeli partnership as "shameful and disgraceful". However, it also opposes taking in Palestinian refugees, claiming that "radical Islamists who are in Palestine could target us".

== Composition ==
=== Cooperating parties or list parties ===
Parties	Main ideology	Leader(s)	EP seats	Regional councillors	Number of candidates for the 2025 parliamentary elections	Member
Communist Party of Bohemia and Moravia	Communism	Kateřina Konečná	1 / 21	32 / 675	158 / 342	2024–
United Democrats – Association of Independents	Conservatism	Alena Dernerová	1 / 21	2 / 675	1 / 342	2024–
Social Democracy	Social democracy	Jana Maláčová	0 / 21	12 / 675	37 / 342	2025
Czech National Social Party	Nationalism	Michal Klusáček	0 / 21	2 / 675	24 / 342	2024–
Moravané	Regionalism	Ctirad Musil	0 / 21	0 / 675	9 / 342	2025–
Communist Party of Czechoslovakia	Marxism–Leninism	Roman Blaško	0 / 21	0 / 675	3 / 342	2024–

=== Regional partners ===
Parties	Main ideology	Leader(s)	Regional councillors
Czech Sovereignty of Social Democracy	Left-wing nationalism	Jiří Paroubek	2 / 675
DOMOV [cs]	Nationalism	David Tygr Ploc	0 / 675

== Election results ==
=== European Parliament ===
Election	List leader	Vote	Vote %	Seats	±	Place	EP Group
2024	Kateřina Konečná	283,935	9.56	2 / 21	▲1 (Note: Compared to 2019 KSČM result)	4th	NI

=== Chamber of Deputies of the Czech Republic ===
Year	Leader	Vote	Vote %	Seats	±	Place	Government
2025	Kateřina Konečná	242,031	4.30	0 / 200	New	7th	No seats

=== Senate ===
Election	First round			Second round			Seats	Total seats	+/–
Election	Votes	%	Place	Votes	%	Place	Seats	Total seats	+/–
2026	7,672	0.66	20th				0 / 27	0 / 81	New

=== Local elections ===
Election	Votes	%	Seats	+/–
2026	194,841	0.18	29 / 62,178	New
