= Vladimír Špidla =

Czech politician

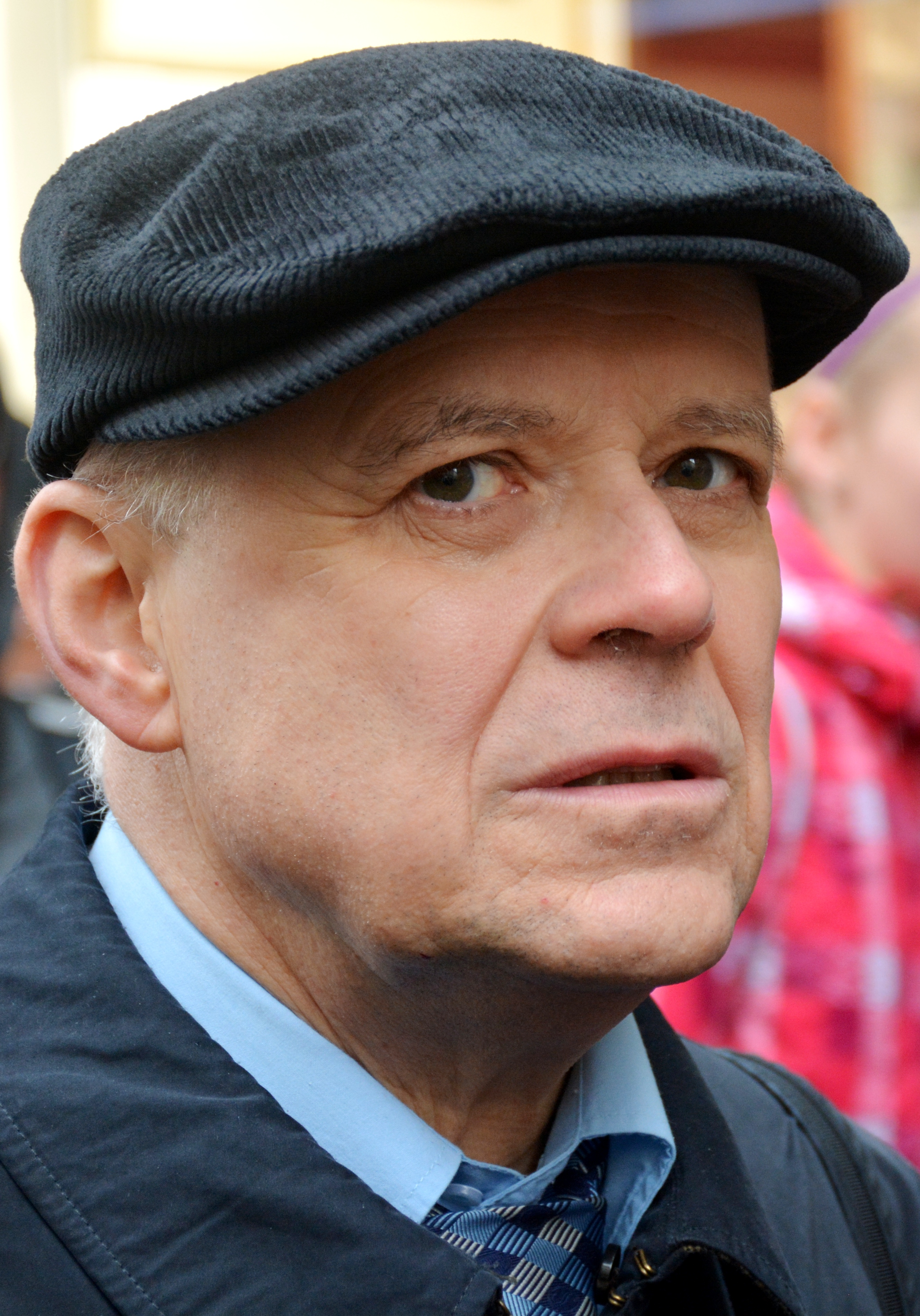
- Špidla in 2015

Prime Minister of the Czech Republic
- In office 12 July 2002 – 26 July 2004
- President: Václav Havel; Václav Klaus
- Preceded by: Miloš Zeman
- Succeeded by: Stanislav Gross

European Commissioner for Employment, Social Affairs and Equal Opportunities
- In office 22 November 2004 – 9 February 2010
- President: José Manuel Barroso
- Preceded by: Anna Diamantopoulou; Stavros Dimas (Employment and Social Affairs)
- Succeeded by: László Andor (Employment, Social Affairs and Inclusion)

Leader of the Czech Social Democratic Party
- In office 7 April 2001 – 26 July 2004
- Preceded by: Miloš Zeman
- Succeeded by: Stanislav Gross

First Deputy Prime Minister Minister of Labour and Social Affairs
- In office 22 July 1998 – 12 July 2002
- Prime Minister: Miloš Zeman
- Preceded by: Stanislav Volák
- Succeeded by: Zdeněk Škromach

Member of the Chamber of Deputies
- In office 1 January 1996 – 31 August 2004

Personal details
- Born: 22 April 1951 (age 75) Prague, Czechoslovakia
- Party: New Social Democracy (since 2026)
- Other political affiliations: Social Democracy (1989–2026)
- Education: Charles University in Prague

Vladimír Špidla (Czech pronunciation: [ˈvlaɟɪmiːr ˈʃpɪdla]; born 22 April 1951) is a Czech politician who served as the prime minister of the Czech Republic from July 2002 to August 2004 and as European Commissioner for Employment, Social Affairs and Equal Opportunities from November 2004 to February 2010. He also served as chief adviser to Prime Minister Bohuslav Sobotka from 2014 to 2017.

== Early life ==
Born in Prague, Špidla studied history at Charles University. His thesis was Založení Živnostenské banky (Establishment of the Entrepreneurial Bank). After his graduation in 1976, he worked in several different jobs, including menial ones, as he refused to fulfil political obligations necessary for access to better employment. He also worked as an archaeologist.

== Political career ==
Špidla entered local politics in his hometown of Jindřichův Hradec after the Velvet Revolution, joining the re-established Czech Social Democratic Party (ČSSD, then called "Czechoslovak Social Democracy"). In 1991–1996 he served as the director of the district labour office. In 1992, he became a member of the Presidium of ČSSD, in March 1997 its statutory vice-chairman, and in April 2001 chairman of ČSSD after the previous chairman Miloš Zeman resigned. He was elected to parliament in 1996, and was First Deputy Prime Minister and Minister of Labour and Social Affairs in the government of Miloš Zeman from 22 July 1998 to 12 July 2002.

He was appointed prime minister on 12 July 2002 in the coalition government of ČSSD and the smaller Christian Democratic Union – Czechoslovak People's Party and Freedom Union – Democratic Union. During that time, he also held Presidential powers from 2 February 2003 until 7 March 2003, as the presidential term ended before the Parliament could elect a new one. His government proposed some reformed to address the growing budget deficit, but their proposals were criticised by the opposition being too mild, as well as focusing too much on tax increases rather than spending cuts. Partly due to tensions within the coalition and a slim majority in the parliament, the government was unable or unwilling to take more radical measures.

Špidla resigned as prime minister in June 2004 following poor results for his party and coalition partners in the 2004 European Parliament elections and subsequent loss of support within ČSSD, and he left office on 26 July 2004. He was succeeded by Interior Minister and Deputy Prime Minister Stanislav Gross, whose government was sworn in on 4 August. Špidla then accepted the nomination to the European Commission, where he became European Commissioner for Employment, Social Affairs and Equal Opportunities from 22 November 2004.

Špidla was considered to be on the left wing of ČSSD, though strongly anti-communist. In foreign policy, he was strongly pro-European and expressed support for further integration. His acceptance of the European Commissioner post was criticised as a "golden parachute", as well as an abandonment of ČSSD and Czech politics.

As a Commissioner, Špidla stated his desire to preserve the European social model, and said that Europe needed to preserve its "core values of social justice, equality, respect for rights and dignity for every individual." His key policies were to "create more and better jobs," "reap the benefits of its enlargement," "address the impact of demographic ageing" and "promote an inclusive society." He also created a European Globalisation adjustment Fund (EGF) similar to the European Social Fund to help businesses adjust to the effects of globalisation. He stood down in February 2010.

Špidla attempted to return to Czech politics, running for a seat in the Czech senate at the 2010 elections, but was defeated by incumbent Tomáš Jirsa of the Civic Democrats. In 2014, Špidla became Chief Adviser to Prime Minister Bohuslav Sobotka.

Špidla was nominated by the Prague branch of ČSSD for the 2021 legislative election. However, the party did not reach the 5% threshold and Špidla thus did not become an MP.

Špidla ran in the 2022 Czech Senate election for the Senate seat of Prague 11. He received 8.39% of votes finishing 5th and thus failed to advance to second round.

In 2026, he left Social Democracy and initiated the formation of a new political party, New Social Democracy.

== Personal life ==
Špidla has been married twice; he has two sons from his first marriage and another two children acquired by marriage. His hobbies include cross-country and marathon running. He speaks German and French, but his English is weaker, which was used to question his qualifications for the European Commission.

Party political offices
Preceded by Miloš Zeman	Chairperson of the Social Democratic Party; 2001–2004	Succeeded by Stanislav Gross
Political offices
Preceded by Miloš Zeman	Prime Minister of the Czech Republic; 2002–2004	Succeeded by Stanislav Gross
Preceded by Pavel Telička	Czech European Commissioner; 2004–2010	Succeeded by Štefan Füle
Preceded by Anna Diamantopoulou; Stavros Dimas as European Commissioner for Employment and Social Affairs	European Commissioner for Employment, Social Affairs and Equal Opportunities; 2004–2010	Succeeded by László Andor as European Commissioner for Employment, Social Affairs and Inclusion
