= State Secretary for European Affairs of the Czech Republic =

State Secretary for European Affairs of the Czech Republic Státní tajemník pro evropské záležitosti České republiky
- Coat of arms of the Czech Republic
- Incumbent; Milena Hrdinková since 1 February 2019
- Appointer: Prime Minister
- Website: https://www.vlada.cz/en/evropske-zalezitosti/

The State Secretary for European Affairs of the Czech Republic (Czech: Státní tajemník pro evropské záložitosti České republiky) is the head of the European Affairs department of the Government of the Czech Republic. The State Secretary for European Affairs is responsible for coordinating Czech interests within the European Union.

The current State Secretary for European Affairs of the Czech Republic is Milena Hrdinková, serving since 1 February 2019.
