= Michal Šmarda (politician) =

Czech politician

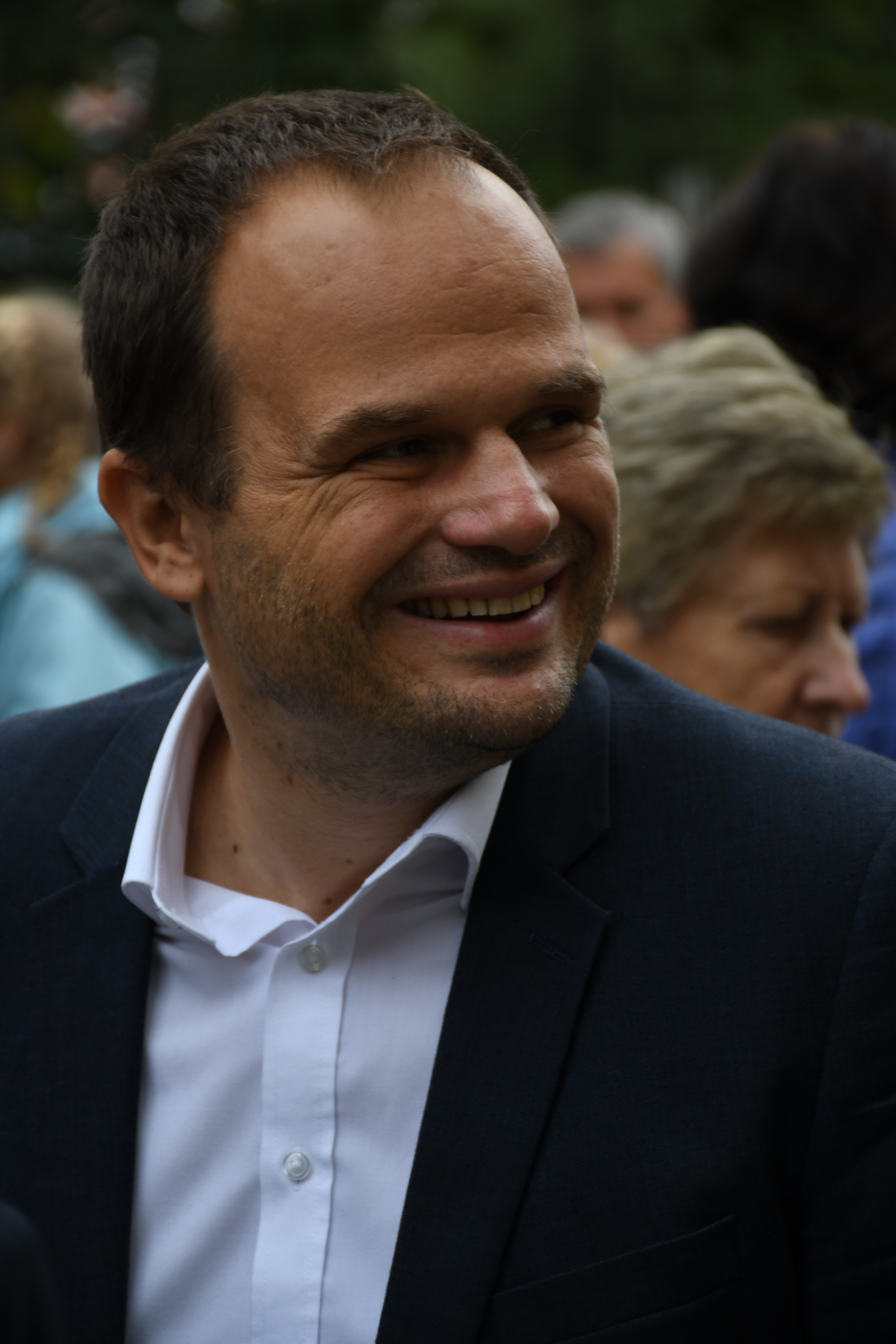
- Šmarda in 2019

Leader of Social Democracy
- In office 10 December 2021 – 5 October 2024
- Preceded by: Jan Hamáček
- Succeeded by: Jana Maláčová

Vice-Chairman of Social Democracy
- In office 1 March 2019 – 9 April 2021

Mayor of Nové Město na Moravě
- Incumbent
- Assumed office 8 November 2010
- Preceded by: Zdeňka Marková

Personal details
- Born: 6 July 1975 (age 50) Nové Město na Moravě, Czechoslovakia
- Party: Social Democracy (1993–2025)

Michal Šmarda (born 6 July 1975) is a Czech politician. He served as the leader of the Social Democracy (SOCDEM) (Note: known as Czech Social Democratic Party (ČSSD) until 2023) from December 2021 to October 2024 and was its vice-chairman from 2019 to 2021. Šmarda has served as the mayor of Nové Město na Moravě since 2010.

On 17 July 2025, Šmarda announced that he will leave the SOCDEM party due to its alignment with Stačilo! for the 2025 Czech parliamentary election.

== Notes ==
Party political offices
Preceded by Jan Hamáček	Leader of the Social Democracy; 2021–2024	Succeeded by Jana Maláčová
