= Jana Maláčová =

Czech politician (born 1981)

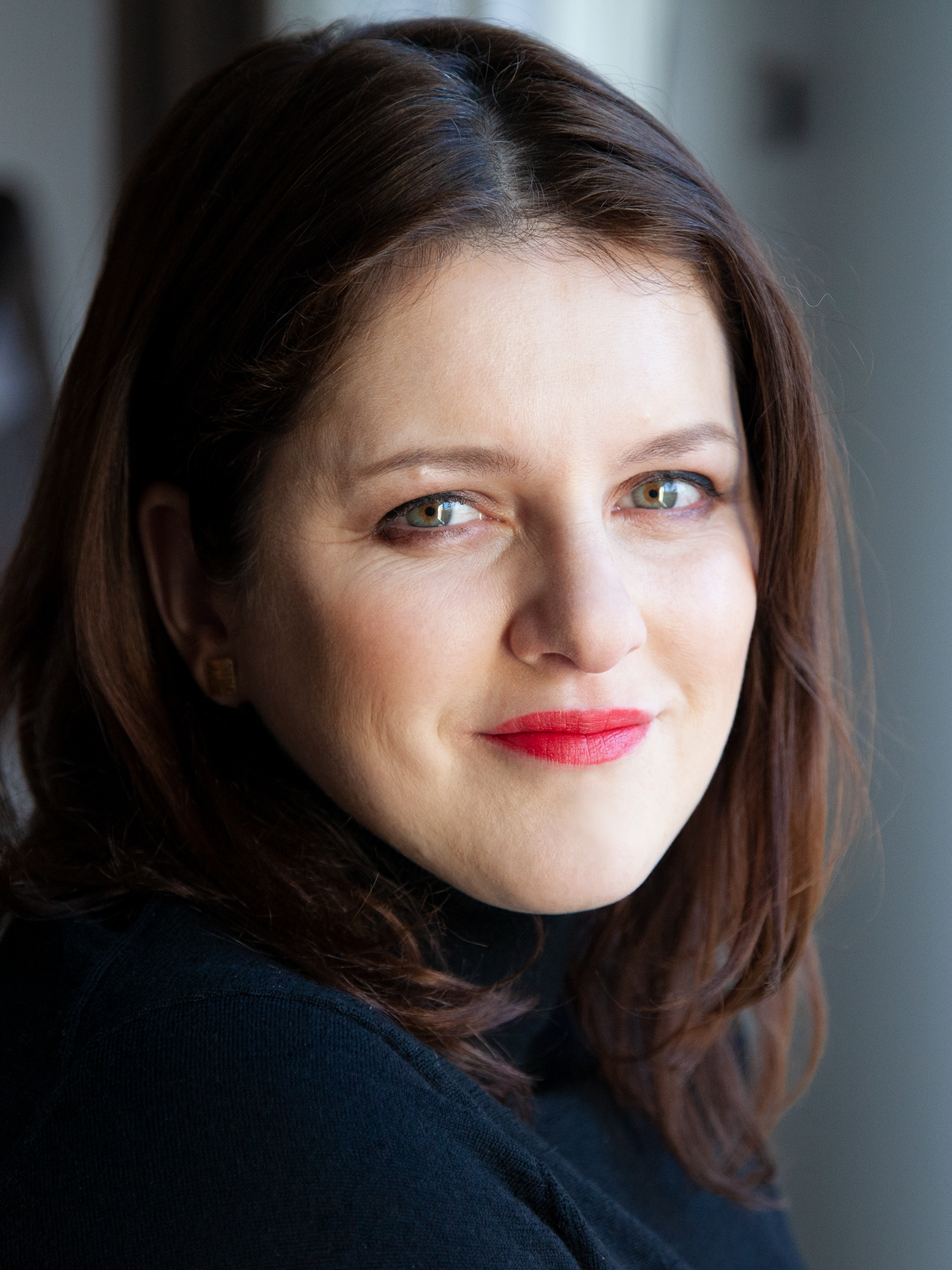
- Maláčová in 2021

Leader of Social Democracy
- In office 5 October 2024 – 13 December 2025
- Preceded by: Michal Šmarda
- Succeeded by: Jiří Nedvěd

Minister of Labour and Social Affairs
- In office 30 July 2018 – 17 December 2021
- Prime Minister: Andrej Babiš
- Preceded by: Petr Krčál
- Succeeded by: Marian Jurečka

Personal details
- Born: 24 June 1981 (age 45) Uherské Hradiště, Czechoslovakia
- Party: ČSSD (since 2008)
- Spouse: Aleš Chmelař (m. 2015; div. 2023)
- Children: 1
- Education: Goethe University; London School of Economics (LSE)

Jana Maláčová (born 24 June 1981) is a Czech politician who served as the leader of the Social Democracy party from October 2024 to December 2025. In July 2018 she took up the post as the Minister of Labour and Social Affairs in the Czech Republic in the Government led by Andrej Babiš. Between March 2019 and December 2021 she was also deputy chairperson of the Social Democracy (that time known as ČSSD).

== Early life and career ==
Jana Maláčová was born 24 June 1981 in Uherské Hradiště, Czechoslovakia (now the Czech Republic). She is educated at Goethe University in Frankfurt and London School of Economics (LSE).

== Political career ==
After finishing her undergraduate studies in 2007, Maláčová worked for the Ministry of Regional Development. Between 2012 and 2014 she worked as the representative for the Senate of the Czech Republic to the European Parliament in Brussels and later served as communications director for the Czech Government on European Union issues. In June 2015, she was appointed the head of Family and Aging policy at the Ministry of Labour and Social Affairs, before becoming Minister on 30 July 2018 following the resignation of Petr Krčál. She was a candidate in the December 2021 Czech Social Democratic Party leadership election. On 5 October 2024, Maláčová became the leader of Social Democratic Party.

On 3 November, after the unsuccessful 2025 Czech parliamentary election, Maláčová announced the end of her political career.

== Personal life ==
Maláčová speaks Czech, German, and English. She was married to Aleš Chmelař and has a son. They finalized their divorce in February 2023.

On 25 May 2025, Maláčová disclosed on her social media that she had been diagnosed with cancer.
