= 2022 Tricolour Citizens' Movement leadership election =

← 2019	29 January 2022	2024 →
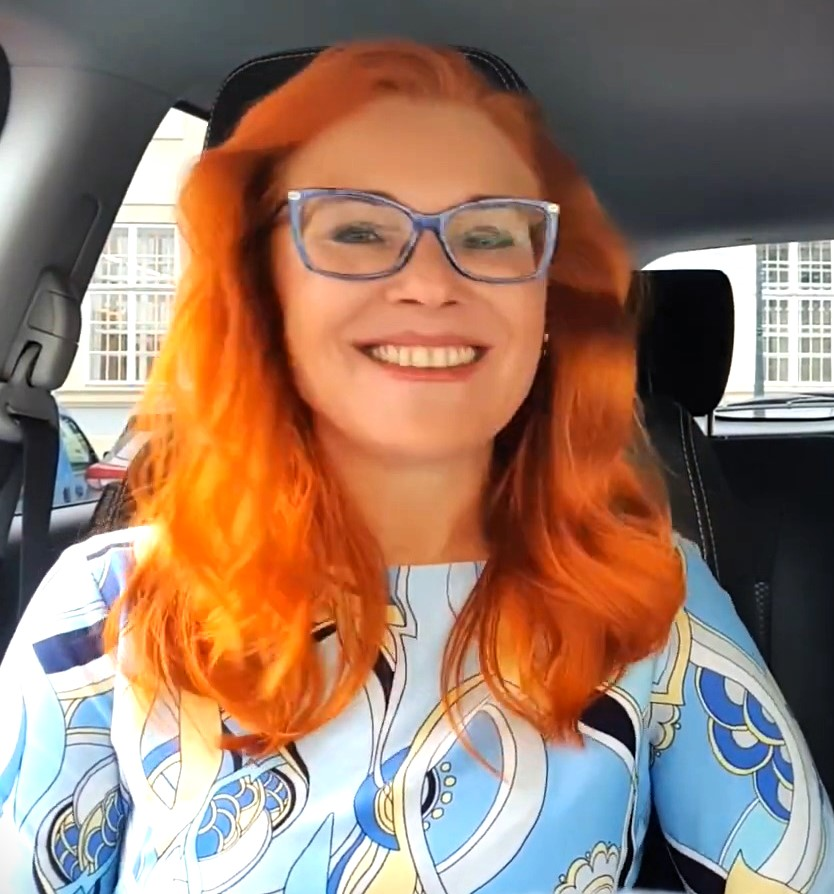

Candidate	Zuzana Majerová	Ivo Budil	Robert Troška
Electoral vote	127
Leader of Tricolour before election
Zuzana Majerová
Elected Leader of Tricolour
Zuzana Majerová

A leadership election for the Tricolour Citizens' Movement was held on 29 January 2022.

== Background ==
Tricolour was founded by MP Václav Klaus Jr. in 2019. Klaus became first leader of the party. Klaus resigned on the position in March 2021 and was replaced by Zuzana Majerová Zahradníková. Tricolour formed electoral alliance with Svobodní and Freeholder Party of the Czech Republic for 2021 Czech legislative election. The alliance received 2.76% of votes and failed to win any seats. Majerová admitted that the result is a disappointment.

Anthropologist Ivo Budil announced his candidacy on 18 November 2021 stating that he wants to renew original ethos of Tricolour as a national conservative patriotic party. Jindřich Rajchl announced on 28 December 2021 that he will run for the position of leader stating election result showed that Zahradníková can't get trust of voters. Rajchl stated that he gained support of some regional organisations. Zahradníková herself already confirmed intention to remain the leader of Tricolour. Robert Troška announced candidacy in January 2022.

== Candidates ==
- Ivo Budil, Anthropologist.
- Jindřich Rajchl, lawyer.
- Robert Troška, Project Manager.
- Zuzana Majerová Zahradníková, the incumbent leader.

== Voting ==
Voting was held on 29 January 2022. Over 200 delegates were allowed to vote. Rajchl withdrawn from election and Majerová Zahradníková defeated Budil and Troška. Zahradníková received 127 votes.
