= Libor Vondráček =

Czech politician and lawyer (born 1994)

Libor Vondráček MP
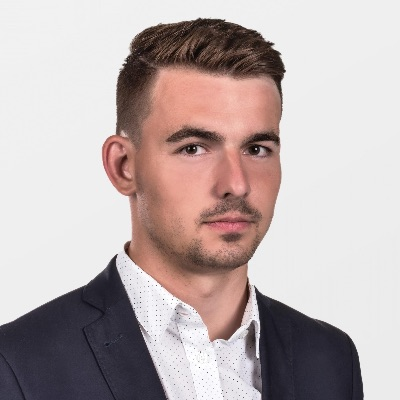
- Official portrait, 2024

Leader of Svobodní
- Incumbent
- Assumed office 17 October 2019
- Preceded by: Tomáš Pajonk

Member of the Chamber of Deputies
- Incumbent
- Assumed office October 2025
- Constituency: South Bohemian Region

Personal details
- Born: 29 July 1994 (age 32) Pelhřimov, Czech Republic
- Party: Svobodní (since 2012)
- Spouse: Married (since 2024)
- Children: 1 (son)
- Education: Masaryk University Faculty of Law
- Website: www.vondraczech.cz

Libor Vondráček (born 29 July 1994) is a Czech politician and lawyer. He has been a member of the Chamber of Deputies since October 2025 and the leader of the Svobodní party since October 2019.

== Early life and education ==
Vondráček was born in Pelhřimov. He graduated from the Faculty of Law at Masaryk University, earning a master's degree (Mgr.) in Law and Legal Science.

During his studies, he focused on constitutional law, culminating in the submission of his thesis "Majority-forming elements in the proportional representation election formula on the example of elections in the Czech Republic" under the supervision of the author of election laws, Jan Filip. With this work, he was nominated the following year for the F. L. Riegr Award competition, which he won, becoming the winner of the fifth edition awarding works that develop parliamentarism.

== Political career ==
Vondráček joined the Svobodní in 2012. In 2017, he was elected a member of the Republican Committee. In the elections to the Chamber of Deputies in 2017, which ended unsuccessfully for the Svobodní (gaining only 1.56% of votes), he received the most preferential votes on the 5th place of the regional candidate list.

In 2018, he initiated a candidacy in municipal elections under the name "Hradec srdcem a rozumem + Svobodní", which ended in 2nd place and gained 4 mandates. However, due to panachage, he was unsuccessful, overtaken by 2 experienced candidates, and is currently only the first substitute.

In the elections to the European Parliament in May 2019, he ran as a member of the Svobodní on the 6th place of the list of the entity named "Svobodní, Liberland and Radostné Česko - ODEJDEME BEZ PLACENÍ", but was not elected. In the regional elections in 2020, he was the leader of the Svobodní list in the South Bohemian Region, but was unsuccessful (the party did not enter the assembly).

In January 2021, he convened a demonstration against government measures. The speakers motivated participants to civil disobedience by violating government orders. The police reported the convener to the administrative body for exceeding the permitted number of participants.

In the elections to the Chamber of Deputies in 2021, he was the leader of the political formation "Trikolóra, Svobodní, Soukromníci" in the South Bohemian Region, but was unsuccessful, as the grouping did not exceed the 5% threshold required for entry into the Chamber of Deputies.

In the elections to the European Parliament in 2024, he was the leader of the Svobodní candidate list. However, the party gained only 1.76% of votes, and he was not elected. In October 2024, he defended the position of party chairman.

In the elections to the Chamber of Deputies in 2025, from the position of a Svobodní member, he was the leader of the joint candidate list of SPD, Trikolora, Svobodní, and PRO in the South Bohemian Region. He succeeded in obtaining the mandate of a deputy and, together with Markéta Šichtařová, became one of the two Svobodní deputies in the Chamber of Deputies.

== Political positions ==
Vondráček describes himself as a conservative libertarian and thus counts among advocates of a small state with low taxes.

=== Criticism of the European Union and proposal for the Czech Republic's exit from the European Union ===
He criticizes the European Union for its democratic deficit and the suppression of personal freedoms. Vondráček claims that the European Union, through subsidies and excessive bureaucracy, creates space for corruption and clientelism. Based on his studies, he considers the reform of the EU to be politically and legally unfeasible. Because the EU contradicts his vision of a state that does not provide benefits to selected groups, he proposes the Czech Republic's withdrawal from the European Union and acceptance of an offer to join the EFTA. Argumentatively, Vondráček builds upon the former MEP for Svobodní Jiří Payne. He admits that, apart from individual state exits, the only alternative for a future peaceful arrangement in Europe is the deletion of Article 10a from the Constitution of the Czech Republic, which would reduce the legal force of EU regulations and directives below the level of Czech laws. In 2025 he repeatedly stated that the policy of SPD is programmatically closest to Svobodní and that leaving the EU (so-called Czexit) would be economically beneficial for the Czech Republic. He also criticized the EU emissions trading system (including ETS 2) as a harmful tool and warned that its rejection would lead to pressure similar to that applied in the case of migration quotas.

=== Freedom of speech, media and other topics ===
After his election to the Chamber of Deputies, Vondráček in 2026 commented significantly on the issue of freedom of speech. In a January 2026 interview for Radiožurnál he stated that the problem of freedom of speech in the Czech Republic is not large, but it is necessary to "turn the helm" so that the country does not approach the British model of prosecuting internet statements. He advocates the abolition of license fees for public media and their financing from the state budget. He has long advocated balanced budgets, lower taxes and rejects increasing the tax burden, arguing that higher taxes do not lead to higher state revenues. Vondráček also criticizes high defence spending and advocates that the Czech Republic should not get involved in "foreign wars". In the area of non-governmental organisations he supports greater transparency and registration of entities with foreign funding.

== Personal life ==
Vondráček has been married since 2024. In July 2025, his son was born, and he lives in Jindřichův Hradec.

He is involved in competitive mariáš, since 2011 he has been the administrator of the South Bohemian Mariáš League website, which he has also led since 2018. This league ranks among the regional competitions recognizing the authority of the Czech Mariáš Association.

Between 2017 and 2019, he also worked as a moderator for the regional station Rádio Česká Kanada.

Party political offices
Preceded by Tomáš Pajonk	Leader of Svobodní; 2019–present	Incumbent
