= Czech Republic First! =

Political demonstration in Prague, Czech Republic (2022)

Czech Republic First! Česká republika na 1. místě!
- Part of the Russian invasion of Ukraine-related protests
- Date: 3 September 2022
- Location: Wenceslas Square, Prague, Czech Republic
- Caused by: Dissatisfaction with the government of Peter Fiala; Energy crisis; Inflation; Pro-Russian sentiment
- Goals: Government resignation; Neutral military status
- Methods: Demonstrations; Protest

Parties
Government of the Czech Republic: MV ČR; Police; Supported by: Government parties: SPOLU; Civic Democratic Party; KDU-ČSL; TOP 09; Pirates and Mayors; Mayors and Independents; Pirate Party	Freedom and Direct Democracy; Law, Respect, Expertise; Tricolour; Communist Party of Bohemia and Moravia; Svobodní

Lead figures
Petr Fiala	Ladislav Vrabel; Jiří Havel; Jana Zwyrtek Hamplová; Vladimíra Vítová; Zuzana Majerová; Kateřina Konečná; Jiří Kobza; Karel Janeček; Hynek Blaško

Number
	ca. 70,000

Czech Republic First! (Czech: Česká republika na 1. místě!) was a mass public demonstration on 3 September 2022 in Wenceslas Square in Prague, expressing dissatisfaction with the government of Petr Fiala and the government's approach to the ongoing energy crisis, inflation, and the Russian invasion of Ukraine. According to police, about 70,000 people took part in the demonstration. A number of politicians and activists participated in the protest or expressed their support for the protesters.

== Goals ==
The demonstration was announced on 30 June by Ladislav Vrabel, with an expected attendance of 5,000 people. According to the organizers, the aim of the demonstration was to unify various opposition parties and movements to express strong dissatisfaction with the government of Petr Fiala, which the organisers alleged was responding inadequately to rising energy prices, inflation, and the threat of natural gas shortages. In addition, they accused the government of prioritizing foreign interests over the interests of the Czech Republic and Czech citizens. On 23 August the expected participation was increased to 50 to 100 thousand people. In the end, according to the police, about 70,000 people took part in the demonstration.

According to Jindřich Rajchl, the aim of the demonstration was to create sufficient pressure for the resignation of the government, as had recently happened in Bulgaria. After anti-government protests in the Bulgarian capital of Sofia, the parliament expressed no confidence in the pro-European government of Kiril Petkov, and the interim official government of Galab Donev began to negotiate with Gazprom on the restoration of natural gas supplies. The co-organizer of the event, Jiří Havel, said the goal of the protest was "the necessity of change, mainly in solving the issues of energy prices, especially electricity and gas, which will cause the destruction of our economy by this autumn."

== Themes ==
The slogan of the demonstration was "Plan Czech Republic First"; protesters demanded that the Czech government should ensure direct supplies of natural gas based on contracts, for example with the Russian Federation, instead of buying natural gas at the current market price on the commodity markets. Furthermore, they called for changes the electricity redistribution system to provide each household with three MWh per year for free, and to force ČEZ to cease trading on the European Energy Exchange (EEX) in Leipzig, "so that we do not pay middlemen on the exchange, but deliver electricity directly to our homes and companies at cheap prices, because the Czech Republic is self-sufficient in electricity and produces electricity cheaply."

The protesters further called for the Czech Republic to become militarily neutral, so it does not become a "battlefield" if a war "between the West and the East" breaks out, and to leave international organizations, especially the European Union, but also the World Health Organization and the United Nations, in order to "restore sovereignty". Furthermore, they demanded that "the favoritism of foreign companies must be ended", in favour of support for Czech-owned small and medium-sized enterprises. They also called for the redesignation of Ukrainian refugees as war refugees, so they are deported back to Ukraine after the war to avoid "the planned dilution of the nation". It was alleged that the Ukrainians' "different lifestyles and language barrier" were dangerous to peaceful coexistence in the Czech Republic.

Speaking at the event, economist and dean of the VŠE Faculty of Economics, Miroslav Ševčík, rejected the European Green Deal, and described Prime Minister Petr Fiala as a "scumbag" and a "footman" of Brussels bureaucrats, who had failed to stand up to European politicians. VŠE rector Petr Dvořák distanced himself from Ševčík's comments, describing his personal attacks on the prime minister as unacceptable.

== Reactions ==
In response to the protest, Prime Minister Petr Fiala said that the demonstration was called by Russian-oriented forces. These comments were challenged by figures from across the political spectrum, including several presidential candidates and some inside his own party such as Martin Kuba, who insisted the public's concerns should be listened to.

According to commentator Jiří X. Doležal from the news server Forum24, the calls to protest were aimed at frustrated and hateful individuals, and could have escalated into violence similar to the attack on the U.S. Capitol on 6 January 2021. He added that for the police, protests had become more dangerous since the International Monetary Fund meeting in Prague. Forum24 editor-in-chief Pavel Šafr called the protesters "fascist scum of Putin's supporters". According to Jan Stránský from the news site Seznam Zprávy, many people were brought to the anti-government protests by a common fear over "whether they will be able to handle the increase in food and especially energy prices".

The Manipulátoři.cz website described the demonstration as a pre-election rally of non-parliamentary anti-system parties. He drew attention to the pro-Russian, disinformation and extremist orientation of some organizers and speakers. Zbyněk Ryšavý from the Romea.cz server also mentioned the significant far-right support for the protests.

The news server PrahaIN.cz reported on the alleged planned removal of the Ukrainian flag from the building of the National Museum and its replacement by the Czech flag.

Political scientist Miloš Gregor and the chairman of the political party Law, Respect, Expertise, Jindřich Rajchl, clashed in a discussion of the protests on CNN Prima News on 6 September 2022. Gregor took the side of Petr Fiala's government, mentioning that Rajchl was facing criminal charges and asking for him to apologise for falsely claiming at the demonstration on Saturday that the cameras in Wenceslas Square had been turned off on the order of Mayor of Prague Zdeněk Hřib. Rajchl, on the other hand, stood by his point that Fiala had, in his initial statement, opposed all the demonstrators, and had only moderated his statement after intervention from his advisors, to say the demonstration was the work of pro-Russian initiatives. Rajchl said the approach of the prime minister and government supporters towards the organizers of the protest was an attempt to ignore the purpose and meaning of the demonstration.
