= 2012 Party of Free Citizens presidential primaries =

7–14 June 2012	2017 →
- Turnout: 35%
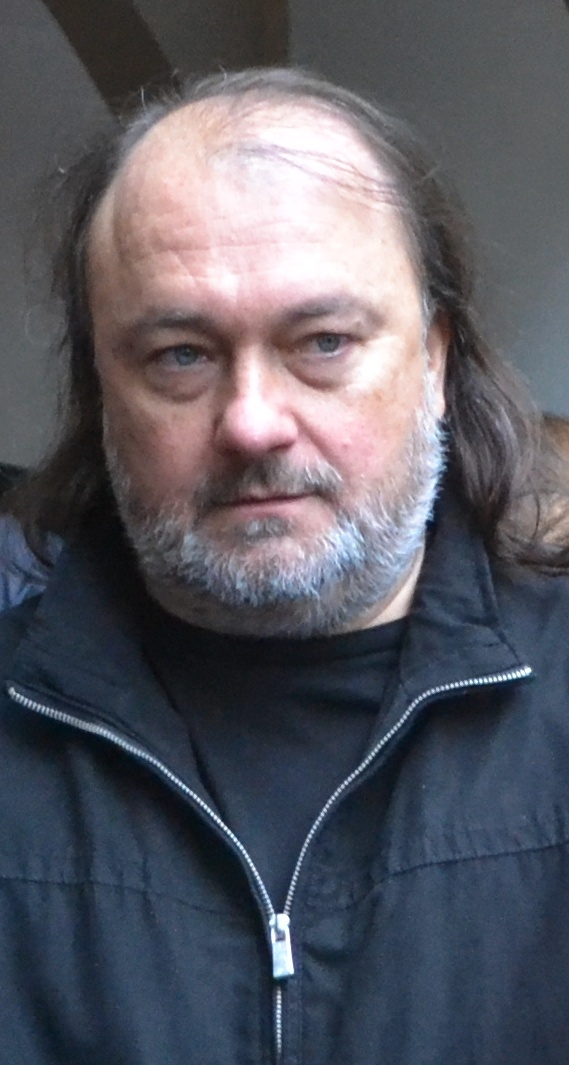
Nominee	Ladislav Jakl
Party	Svobodní
Percentage	88%

Party of Free Citizens presidential primaries, 2012 were held for 2013 Czech presidential election from 7 to 14 June 2012. Ladislav Jakl was the only candidate. His nomination was considered almost certain. Jakl's candidature was supported by Václav Klaus.

== Background ==
Party's leader Petr Mach mentioned possibility of holding primaries in an interview for server Česká pozice In May 2012, it was reported that Party of Free Citizens considers to nominate Ladislav Jakl, the secretary of incumbent president Václav Klaus. It was also reported that Jakl's nomination would have to be authorised in primaries. Jakl received support from party's leadership on 28 May. Voting took place from 7 June to 14 June. Voter turnout was 35%. Jakl received 88% of votes and won the primaries.

== Result ==
Candidate	Votes	%
Ladislav Jakl		88%
Against		12%

== Aftermath ==
Jakl has received 88% and won the nomination. Party of Free Citizens didn't have enough members of parliament and so Jakl needed 50,000 of signatures. Party of Free Citizens started to gather signatures after the primaries ended. Jakl eventually failed to gather enough signatures. He had something over 25,000 signatures on 6 November. He admitted that he should have worked harder.
