= November 2017 Party of Free Citizens leadership election =

Czech political event

- 12–18 November 2017
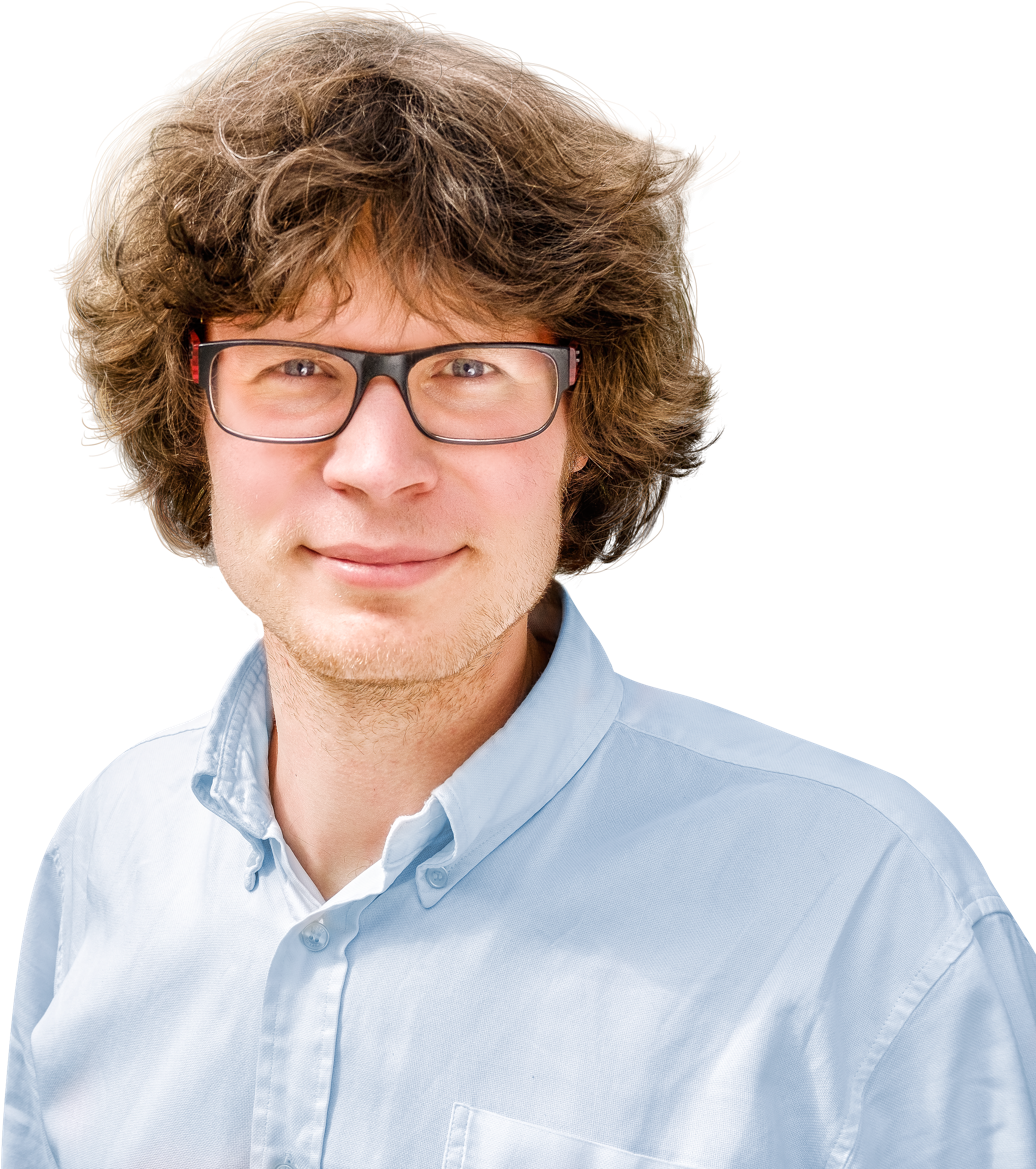

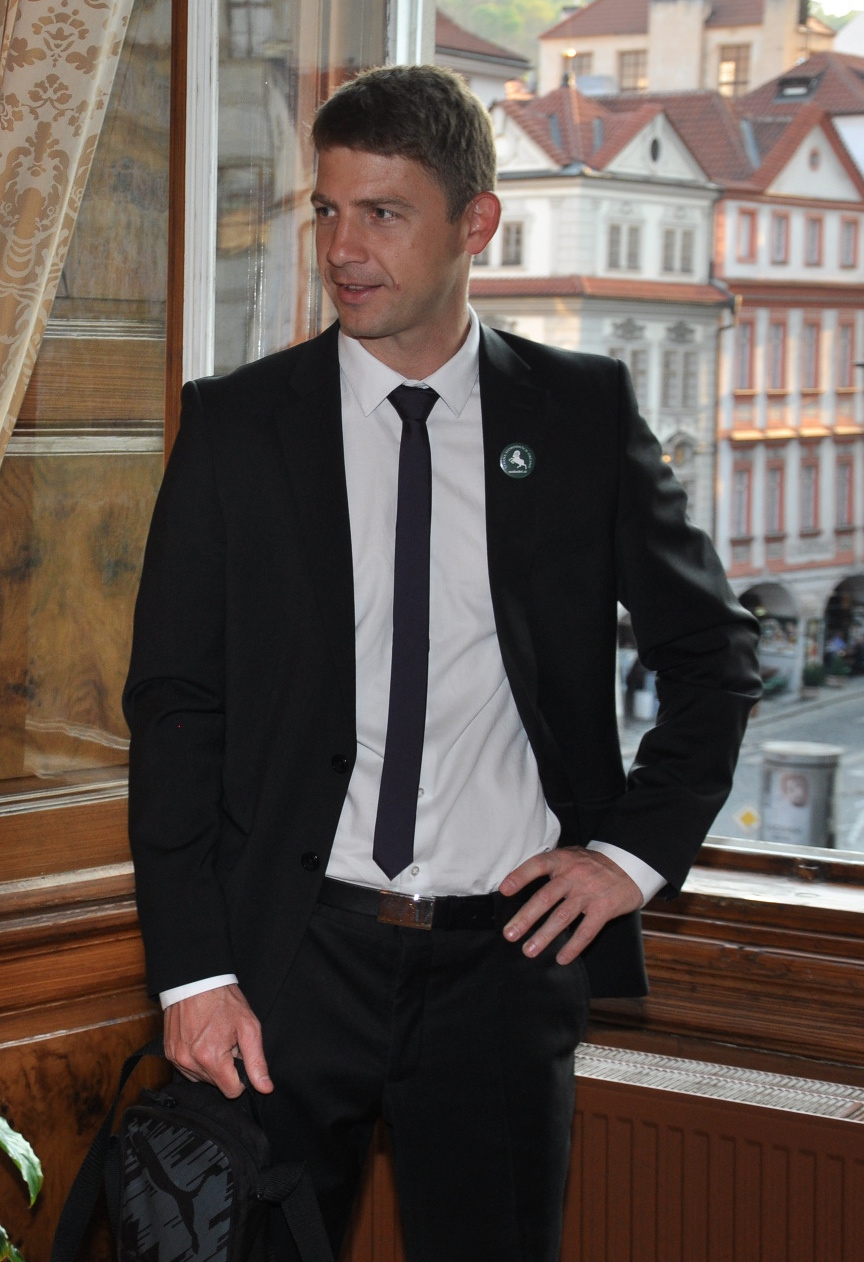

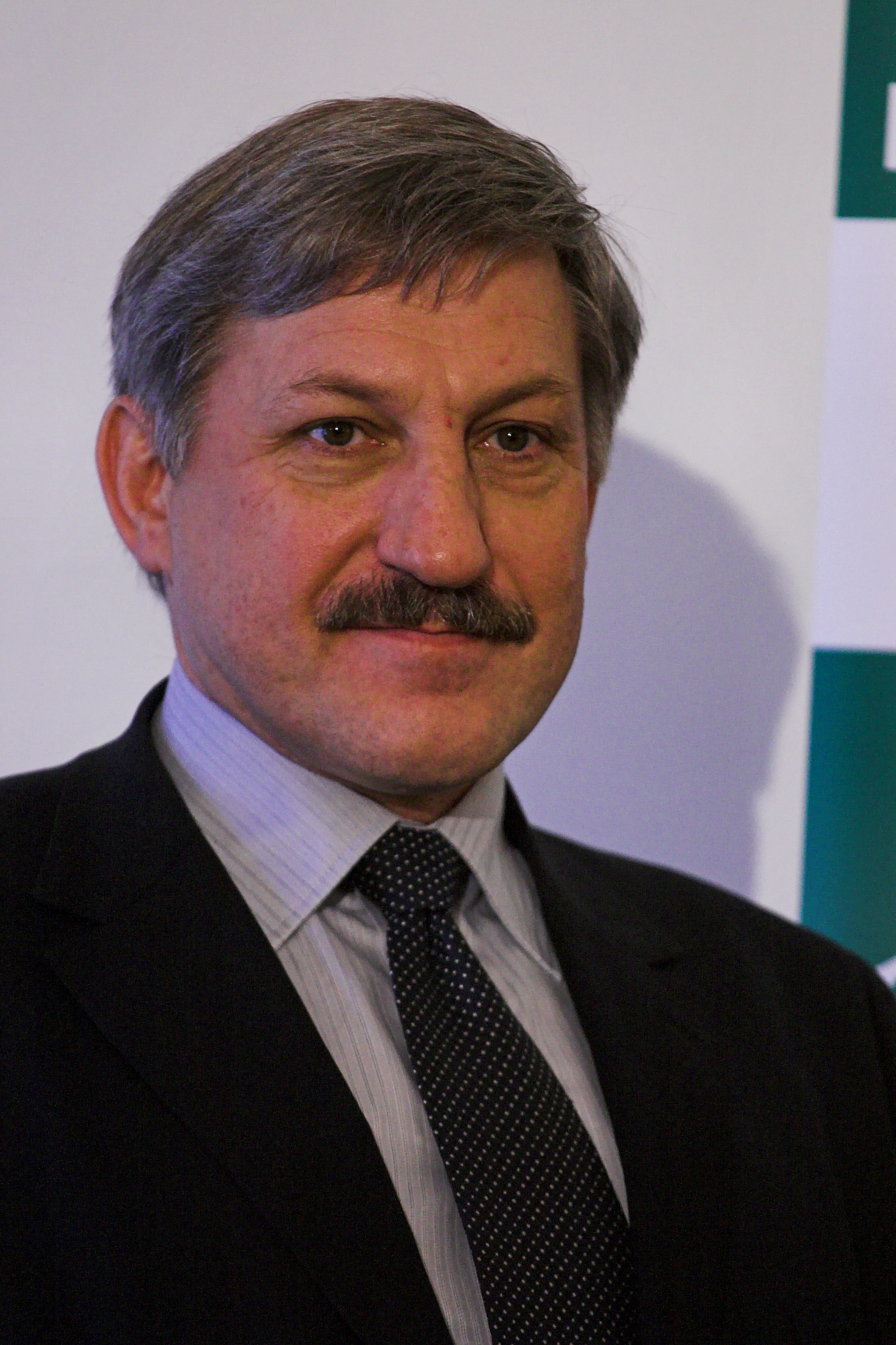
Candidate	Tomáš Pajonk	Petr Mach	Jiří Payne
Popular vote	233	106	96
Percentage	51.7%	23.5%	21.7%
Leader of Svobodní before election
Petr Mach
Elected Leader of Svobodní
Tomáš Pajonk

A leadership election for the Czech Party of Free Citizens was held on 18 November 2017, after the party's unsuccessful results in the legislative election and consequent resignation of the party's leadership. The election was expected to be a two-way contest between Tomáš Pajonk and Jiří Payne, but on 11 November 2017, former leader Petr Mach announced his candidacy. The results were announced on 19 November 2017, with Pajonk defeating Mach by a large margin.

== Background ==
A legislative election was held on 20–21 October 2017. Svobodní's share of the vote fell to 1.5% from 2.6% in the 2013 election. The incumbent leader Petr Mach resigned afterwards, and the election was scheduled for 12–18 November. Mach stated that he would consider standing again. Tomáš Pajonk and Jiří Payne were the first prominent candidates to announce their candidacy. Pajonk was previously suggested by Mach. The election was expected to be a two-way contest between Pajonk and Payne. Mach eventually decided to run and announced his candidacy on 10 November 2017. The other two candidates were Tomáš Michalička and Daniel Urban.

== Candidates ==
- Petr Mach, the incumbent leader. He announced his candidacy on 11 November 2017.
- Tomáš Michalička
- Tomáš Pajonk, member of Zlín Region assembly. He was suggested by Mach.
- Jiří Payne, Member of the European Parliament.
- Daniel Urban

== Result ==
Candidate	Votes	%
Tomáš Pajonk	233	51.7%
Petr Mach	106	23.5%
Jiří Payne	96	21.3%
Daniel Urban	14	3.1%
Tomáš Michalička	2	0.4%
Total	451	100

== Aftermath ==
The results were announced on 19 November 2017. Pajonk received over 50% of votes and became the new leader.
