= Institute for Liberal Studies (Czech Republic) =

Czech think tank

Institut Liberálních Studií
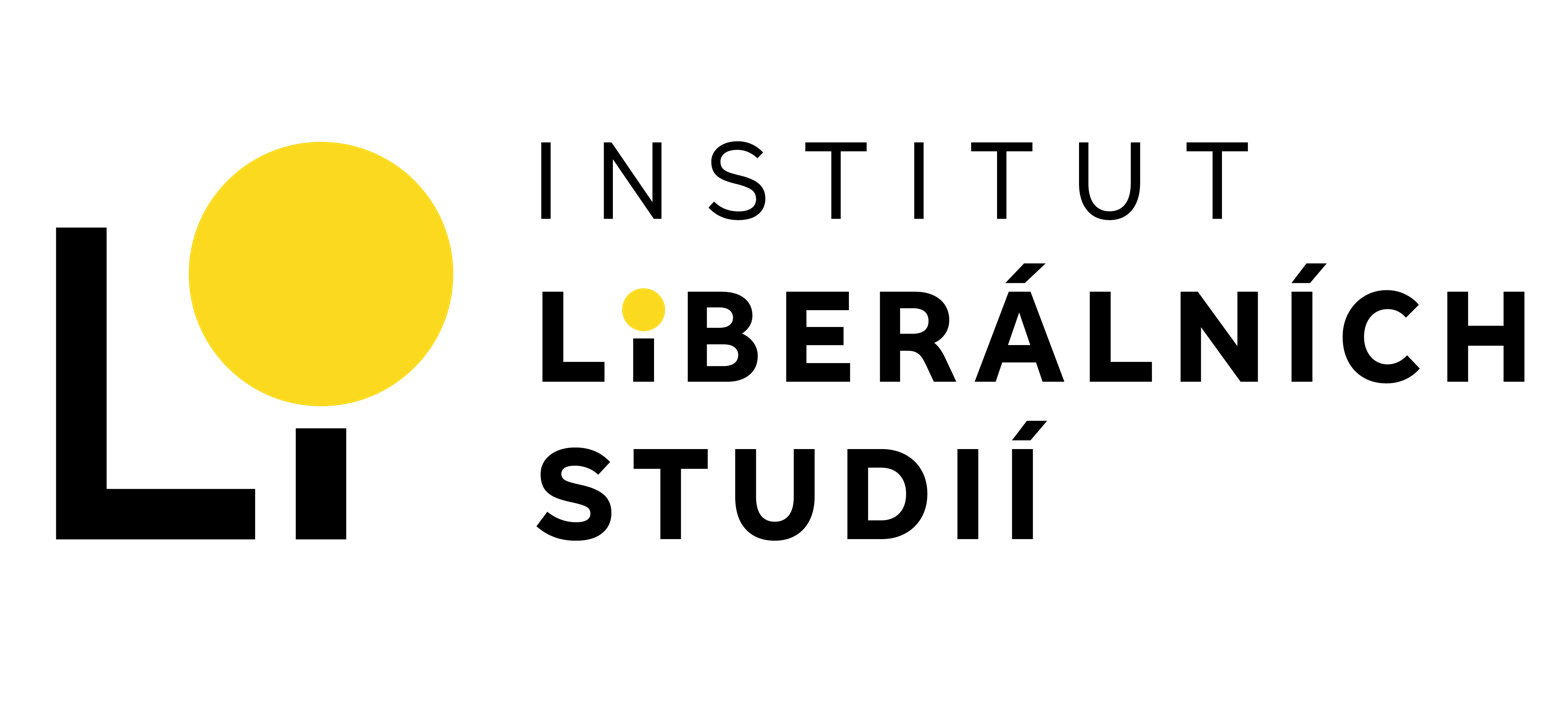

Non-Profit Think Tank
- Predecessor: Liberal Institute
- Date of Creation: July 17, 2020
- Legal Form: Institute (CS: ústav)
- Purpose: Education
- Location: Prague
- Scope: Czech Republic
- Director: Martin Pánek
- Official Website: https://inlist.cz/
- Tax ID: CZ09324194
- coordinates: 50°6′16.75″N 14°23′26.05″E

The Institute for Liberal Studies (Czech: Institut Liberálních Studií) is a Czech public policy think tank based in Prague, which aims to promote the principles of classical liberalism. It is currently led by Martin Pánek. Previously known as the Liberal Institute, it was founded in its current form in July 2020 by Tomáš Pajonk, continuing the tradition of the defunct Liberal Institute founded in 1990. The institute publishes research promoting the ideas of classical liberalism as applied to the Czech and European political systems.

== History ==
=== Liberal Institute ===
The F.A. Hayek Liberal Association was founded by Jiří Schwarz, Tomáš Ježek, and Miroslav Ševčík during the early stages of the Velvet Revolution in 1989. It was then registered on February 6, 1990, as the Liberal Institute. The institute has since been led by Miroslav Ševčík, Petr Koblovský, and Dominik Stroukal. Ševčík was deposed as director in 2013 and later expelled from the institute following controversy related to his tenure as dean of the Faculty of Economics at the Prague University of Economics and Business. He subsequently sued the institute to be reinstated.

During this period, six of the institute's fellows served as economic advisors to the Czech government. These included Jiří Schwarz and Miroslav Zámečník (to the Topolánek Cabinet), and Dominik Stroukal, Mojmír Hampl, Aleš Rod, and Libor Dušek (to the Fiala Cabinet). Hampl, a former editor of the institute's magazine Laissez Faire, went on to become a vice-governor of the Czech National Bank and a president of the Czech National Budget Council. Petr Mach, also a former editor of the magazine, was elected as a Member of the European Parliament after parting ways with the institute. Additionally, Jiří Schwarz and Josef Šíma were elected presidents of the Anglo-American University and the CEVRO Institute, respectively.

=== Institute of Liberal Studies ===
Having been re-established in 2020 by Tomáš Pajonk, the institute has existed under its current name since August 2024. The first and current director is Martin Pánek, the former director of the Liberal Institute. After the beginning of the Russian invasion of Ukraine, the institute established a humanitarian mission directed by Vít Samek.

The institute is a member of the international think tank networks Economic Freedom of the World Network and 4liberty.eu.

== Activities ==
=== Research ===
The institute's activities and publications revolve around the principles of classical liberalism, libertarianism, and anarcho-capitalism. Key areas of emphasis include reducing taxes, deregulation, the promoting competition, reducing the size of the state, and Euroscepticism. In recent years, the institute has also started advocating for social liberties including immigration, same-sex marriage, abortion, and free speech.

The institute does not receive or solicit public grants or subsidies.

=== Events ===
Since 1991, the institute and its predecessors have organized summer schools for high school and college students. These schools promote the institute's ideology through lectures and discussions.

The institute also organizes a public relations event to mark Tax Freedom Day in the Czech Republic, which aims to highlight the extent of government spending and its cost to Czech taxpayers.

Every year, the institute organizes a lecture featuring a prominent international figure of classical liberalism. This individual is awarded a prize for "contributing to the proliferation of ideas of liberty and free competition, for honoring private property and the rule of law."

=== Publications ===
In addition to its own publications, the institute has published several Czech translations of foreign books. These include The Wealth of Nations, Theory of Moral Sentiments, Economics in One Lesson, Man, Economy, and State, and Free to Choose. A team led by Josef Šíma translated many seminal works on classical liberal economics in the 1990s and 2000s, including those by Adam Smith, Ludwig von Mises, Frédéric Bastiat, Mancur Olson, Milton Friedman, and Gary Becker.

The institute also publishes its own journals, Terra Libera and Laissez Faire.

== Operation "Kyseláč" ==
Under the leadership of Vít Samek, a former Prague paramedic, the institute launched its humanitarian mission to Ukraine on February 25, 2022. The mission, named Operation "Kyseláč" (Sour Ale), has retained it satirical name since its inception.

Initially, the mission focused on bringing humanitarian aid to the Slovak-Ukrainian border and transporting refugees back to Prague or other destinations. Since April 2022, it has worked intensively with the First Volunteer Surgical Hospital in Lysets, near Ivano-Frankivsk. The humanitarian mission maintains its own dedicated website and a transparent account for fundraising.

In April 2022, Operation "Kyseláč" raised CZK 2.3 million to buy abortion pills, thanks to a controversy with Hnutí pro život, a Czech pro-life movement. In April 2023, the institute organized an event at the DOX Prague Gallery for Ukrainian children in the Czech Republic, where they painted a new van with Ukrainian motifs. In June 2023, Vít Samek received the third-place award for Volunteer of the Year among small and medium-sized foreign organizations. The institute reports that it has already delivered more than $1 million worth of humanitarian aid to Ukraine.
