= Jiří Payne =

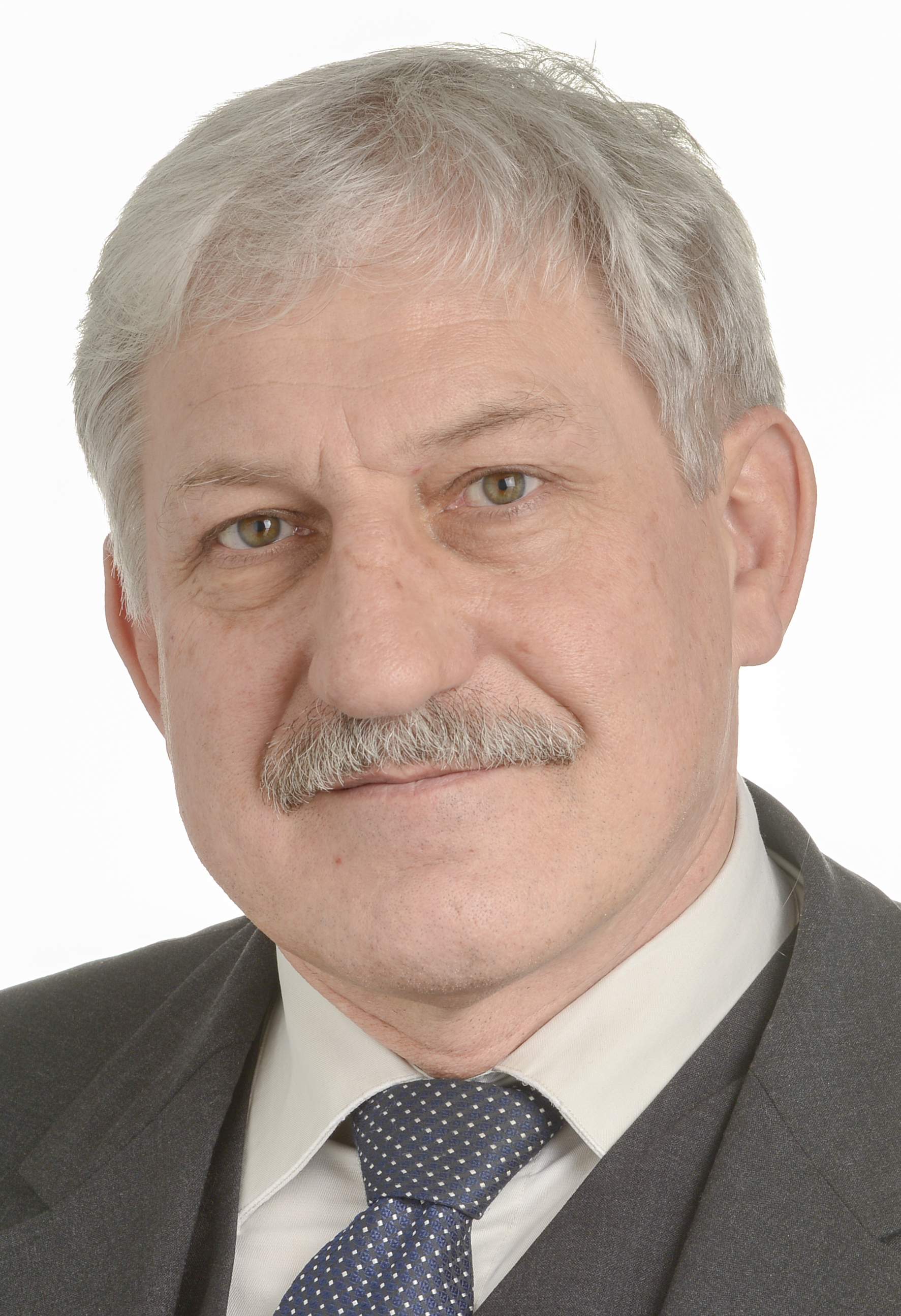

Member of the European Parliament for Czech Republic
- In office 5 September 2017 – 30 June 2019

Personal details
- Born: 7 July 1956 (age 69) Prague, Czechoslovakia
- Party: Party of Free Citizens (2009–); ODS (1991–2009); OF (1989–1991)
- Website: https://www.payne.cz/

Jiří Tomáš Payne (born 7 July 1956) is a Czech politician and former Member of the European Parliament (MEP).

== Biography ==
Payne attended Charles University and graduated with a degree in nuclear physics. However, due to his political beliefs he was not formally given a diploma until 1991. Because he was not able to work in his field, he turned to politics, joining the Civic Forum for its two years in existence (1989–1991) and was one of the founding members of the Civic Democratic Party (ODS). He was first elected to political office in the 1990 Czech National Council election, then was elected as a member of the Chamber of Deputies, and was re-elected in 1996 and 1998. He did not run for re-election in 2002, and in 2004 began to serve as an adviser to then-President Václav Klaus, who he had been an ally of since the Civic Democratic Party's founding.

In 2009, Payne was one of the members of the ODS who split to form a new party, the Party of Free Citizens (now Svobodní), and served as its first vice-chairman. As a member of Svobodní, he ran for Senate in the 2014 Prague 10 by-election, finishing in seventh. He also ran in the European Parliament elections that same year. He finished second in the party's list of candidates, meaning he was first alternate should a position open up. That took place three years later in 2017, when Petr Mach resigned as an MEP member. Payne filled that seat and served as a member until 2019. During his time as an MEP member, he was part of the Europe of Freedom and Direct Democracy group.

After Mach's resignation as Svobodní party leader, Payne ran for leadership of the party in the November 2017 Party of Free Citizens leadership election, finishing in third behind Tomáš Pajonk and Mach. In 2019, as his term as MEP concluded, he resigned from his position as party vice-chairman, as he felt it was no longer the party he helped found and could not support the direction it was heading.
