= 2014 Prague 10 by-election =

September 2014 Czech senate by-election
19–27 September
- Turnout: 15.8% (1st round); 8.8% (2nd round)
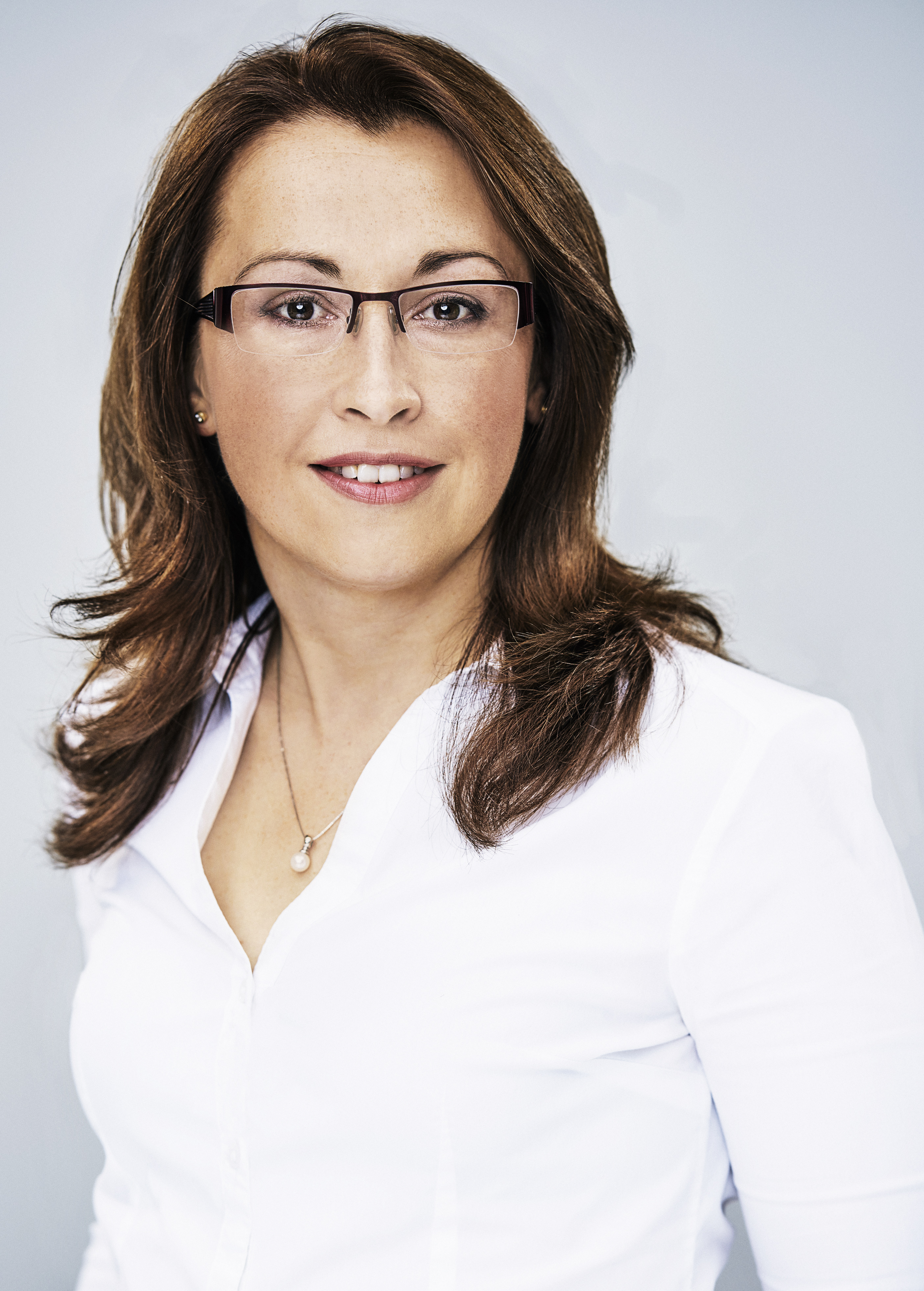

	First party	Second party
Candidate	Ivana Cabrnochová	Jana Dušková
Party	SZ	ANO
Popular vote	3,664	3,532
Percentage	50.9%	49.1%

A by-election for the Prague 10 Senate seat was held in the Czech Republic on 19–20 September 2014 and 26–27 September 2014. The election was held after incumbent Jaromír Štětina got elected member of European Parliament. Voter turnout was 15.8% for first round and 8.75% for second round. It was the lowest voter turnout for any Senate election so far.

Cabrnochová remained Senator until 2016 Senate election when she received 12% and was eliminated in the first round.

== Results ==
Candidate	Party	First round		Second round	
Candidate	Party	Votes	%	Votes	%
Ivana Cabrnochová	Green Party-Czech Social Democratic Party	2,092	15.83	3,664	50.91
Jana Dušková	ANO 2011	2,060	15.59	3,532	49.08
Renata Sabongui	TOP 09	2,055	15.55		
Antonín Panenka	NPP10-HPLD	1,776	13.44		
Oldřich Choděra	Civic Democratic Party	1,564	11.83		
Lubomír Chudoba	KDU-ČSL-LES	1,293	9.78		
Jiří Payne	Party of Free Citizens	977	7.39		
Milan Neubert	Communist Party of Bohemia and Moravia	954	7.22		
Miroslav Kos	SNOP13	399	3.01		
Pavel Jánský	Czech Sovereignty	43	0.32		
