= Center for Civil Liberties =

Center for Civil Liberties may refer to:

- Center for Civil Liberties (human rights organization)
- Center for Civil Liberties (think tank)
