= Vít Jedlička =

President of Liberland (born 1983)

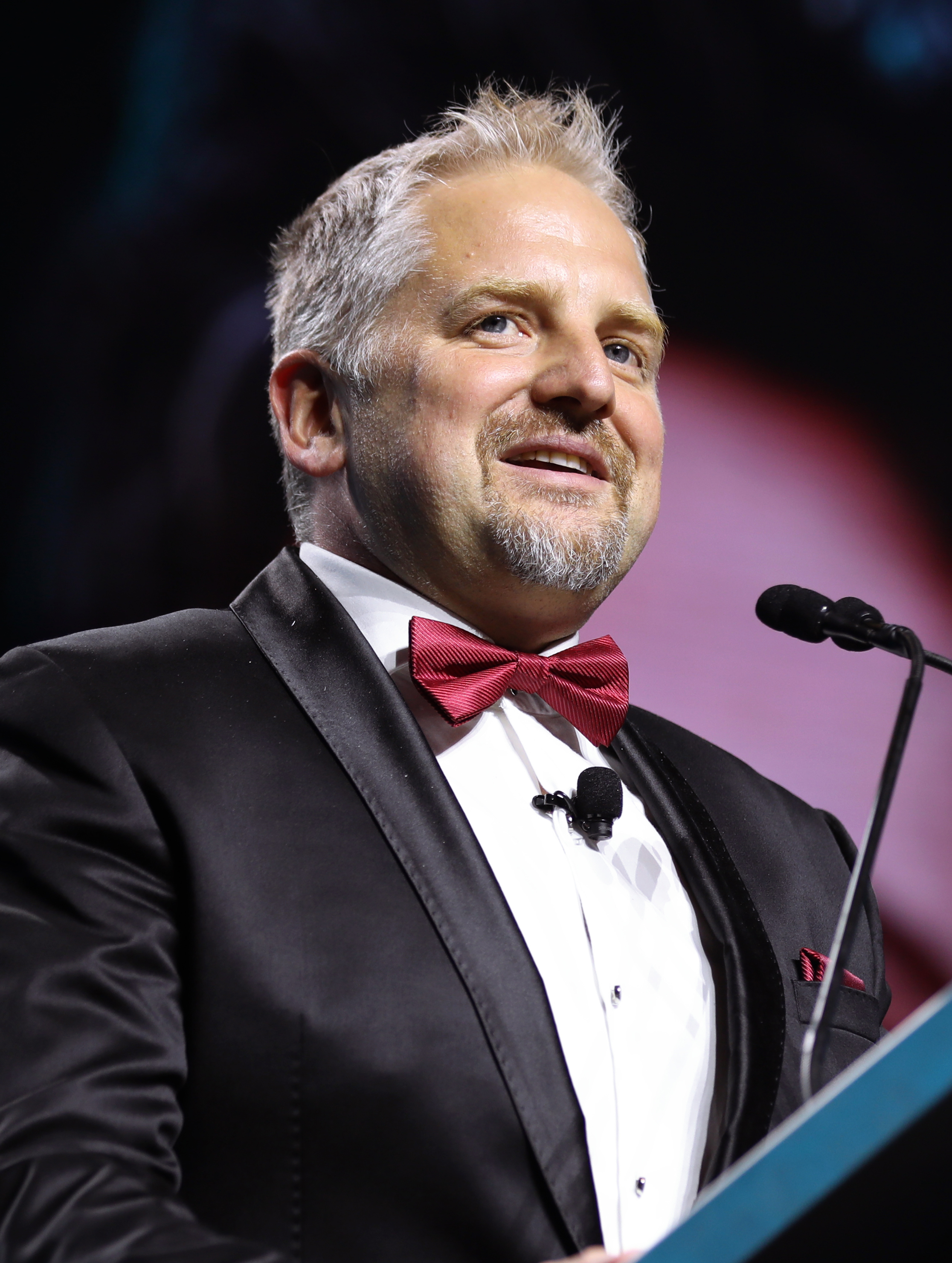
Jedlička in 2024

Vít Jedlička (Czech: [ˈviːt ˈjɛdlɪtʃka]; born 6 September 1983) is a Czech right-wing libertarian politician, publicist, and activist. He was the chairman of the Party of Free Citizens in the Hradec Králové Region and serves as the founder and chairman of the Czech voluntary association Reformy.cz. On 13 April 2015, he declared the unrecognised micronation of Liberland, claiming a patch of land that is part of the Croatia–Serbia border dispute as a new libertarian capitalist nation.

== Early life and career ==
Jedlička was born in 1983 in Czechoslovakia. Jedlička's father was removed from his office job at the Institute of Weights and Measures in Prague after losing favour with the authorities for resisting the Communist Party of Czechoslovakia membership and was sent to work as a mechanic. During the 1997 Czech financial crisis, his family nearly went bankrupt when the Czech central bank raised interest rates to 25 percent.

In 2008, Jedlička received a bachelor's degree in international relations and affairs from the University of Economics, Prague. He gained his master's degree in political science at the CEVRO Institute in 2014. Jedlička's working career ranges from sales and management to financial analysis and IT. From 2006 to 2009, he was the managing director of HKfree.net, a civic network and internet service in his hometown of Hradec Králové. From 2009 to 2014, Jedlička was the regional chairman of the Party of Free Citizens. In 2011, he co-founded the community news service Reformy.cz and became its chairman.

== Political career ==
In 2001, Jedlička became a member of the Civic Democratic Party (ODS). In 2009, he became a member of the Free Citizens Party (Svobodní) and was elected the first regional president in Hradec Králové Region of party. As an independent politician, Jedlička was the leading candidate of the coalition of the Free Citizens Party, Liberland, and Radostné Česko − ODEJDEME BEZ PLACENÍ for the 2019 European Parliament election in the Czech Republic.

=== Views ===
Jedlička is described as holding right-wing liberal views on individual freedom and the least state intrusion possible; his website Reformy.cz is described as right-wing libertarian, libertarian conservative, and Eurosceptic, and influenced by the likes of Frédéric Bastiat, Murray Rothbard, Ron Paul, and Nigel Farage. A critic of socialism, he described himself as a Bastiat-influenced anarcho-capitalist. Jedlička is an Eurosceptic who alleges there is a democratic deficit in the institution of the European Union (EU) and abuses of basic moral rules by EU institutions and EU member states. He described the European Stability Mechanism as a protectorate. A Property and Freedom Society attendee in 2015, Jedlička was a strong critic of the Prime Minister's conservative and self-described paleoconservative advisor Roman Joch, who supported the wars in Iraq and Afghanistan. In response to Joch, who said at a seminar of the Center for Economics and Politics that Paul was a true right-winger in domestic politics but that his isolationist conception of foreign policy was left-wing, Jedlička stated: "Ron Paul is one of the few genuinely right-wing politicians in US foreign policy. This policy has been traditional since the time of Thomas Jefferson, who himself expressed it well with the saying: 'We build friendly trade relations with all nations, but we do not form military alliances with any.'"

Jedlička questions the official version of 9/11 and said that Osama bin Laden was murdered without due process. He also said that both George W. Bush and Barack Obama were leading the United States towards non-freedom, and that there was no significant difference between the two administrations in terms of foreign policy and civil liberties.

=== Liberland ===
On 13 April 2015, Jedlička proclaimed the Free Republic of Liberland on Gornja Siga, disputed territory of either Serbia or Croatia, which he considered unclaimed land (terra nullius). Jedlička's claim is not recognised by any country. In practice, Gornja Siga is administered by the local Croatian police department.
