= Tereza Hyťhová =

Czech teacher and politician

Member of the Chamber of Deputies
- In office 21 October 2017 – 21 October 2021

Personal details
- Born: 23 February 1995 (age 31) Czech Republic
- Party: Law, Respect, Expertise (2024–present); Tricolour (2020–2024); Freedom and Direct Democracy (2016–2020)
- Occupation: politician, teacher

Tereza Hyťhová (born 23 February 1995) is a Czech politician and former member of the Chamber of Deputies. She was elected to represent the Ústí nad Labem Region for Freedom and Direct Democracy in October 2017, before defecting to the Tricolour Citizens' Movement in July 2020. She was a member of the Chamber of Deputies' Schools and Social Committee.
