= Liberland =

Unrecognized micronation in Europe

Free Republic of Liberland
- Micronation (unrecognised entity)
- Location of the claimed territory of Liberland in Europe
- Location: Gornja Siga on floodplain adjacent to the Danube River; 45°46′00″N 18°52′30″E
- Area claimed: 7 km^{2} (2.7 sq mi)
- Number of residents: 0
- Claimed by: Vít Jedlička
- Dates claimed: 2015–present
- Website liberland.org

The Free Republic of Liberland, commonly referred to as Liberland, is an unrecognised, uninhabited micronation claimed by Czech right-libertarian politician and activist Vít Jedlička, who in 2015 claimed Gornja Siga, an uninhabited stretch of floodplain on the Croatian bank of the Danube, as territory for a new independent country.

Jedlička envisioned a political system characterized by laissez-faire capitalism, minimal government, and an economy based on cryptocurrency. He sells purported passports of Liberland for $10,000.

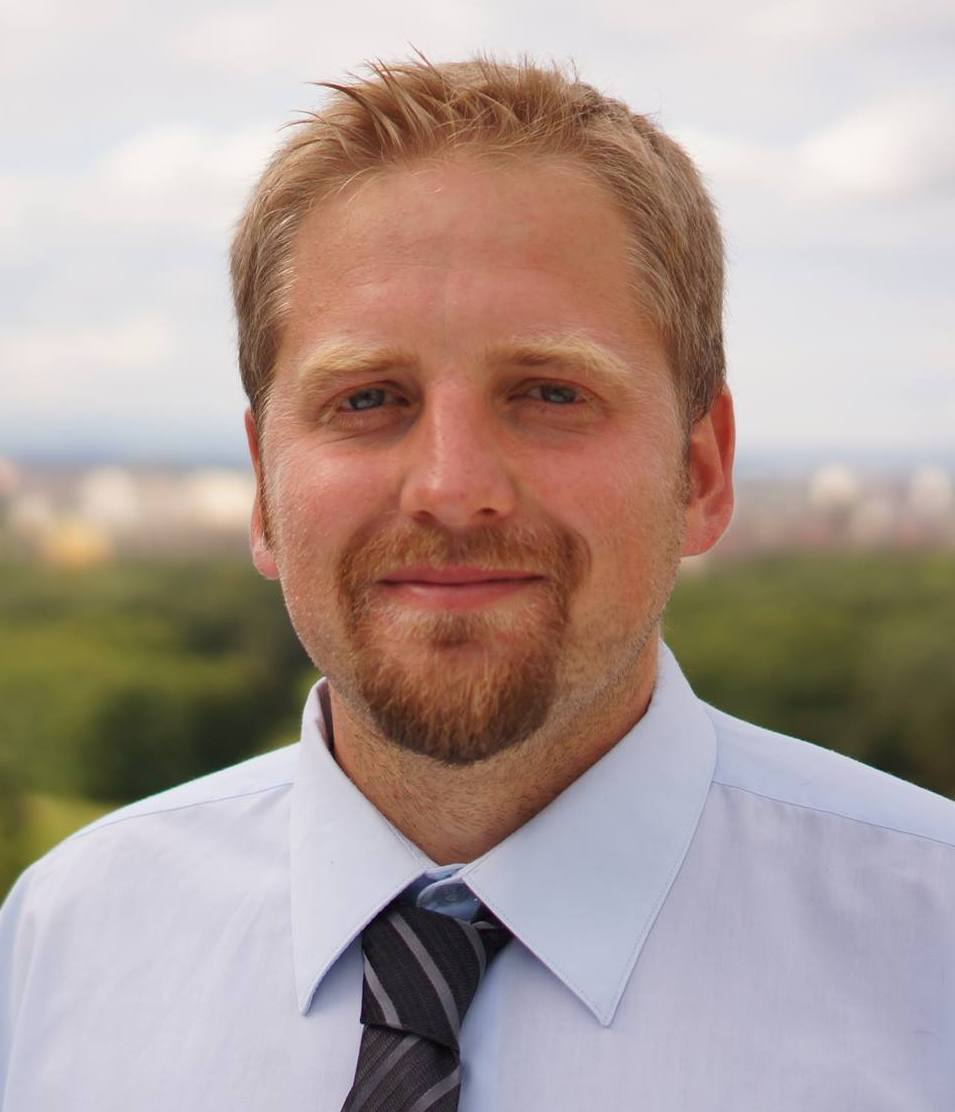
Vít Jedlička, founder and president of Liberland

Liberland's website states that the nation was founded in the wake of the ongoing Croatia–Serbia border dispute. Jedlička asserts that this dispute means Gjorna Siga is unclaimed by either country, so is free for him to claim. The parcel of land in question is 7 km^{2} (2.7 sq mi) in area, roughly the same size as Gibraltar. It has been administered by Croatia since the Croatian War of Independence.

Liberland has no recognition from any recognized nation. The land lacks infrastructure and lies on a floodplain. Croatia has frequently blocked off access to Gornja Siga since 2015. A number of people, including Jedlička, have been arrested for trying to enter the claimed land.

== Location ==
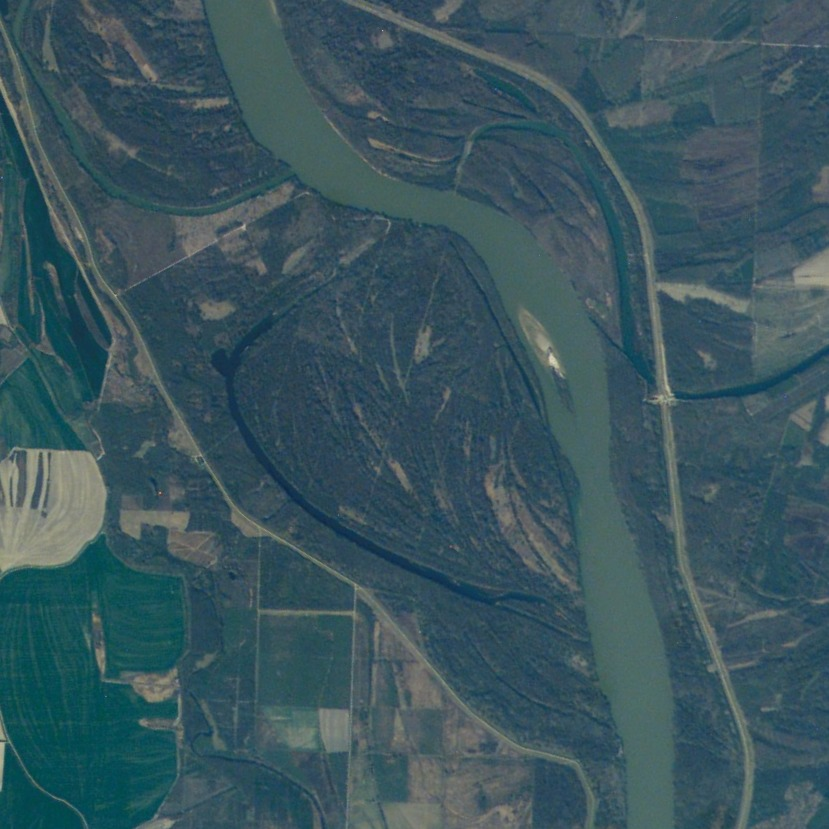
Satellite image of Gornja Siga taken by ISS Expedition 14 in 2007

The dispute regarding the border along the Danube River valley first arose in 1947 but was left unresolved during the existence of the Socialist Federal Republic of Yugoslavia. It became a contentious issue after the break-up of Yugoslavia. Serbia holds the opinion that the thalweg of the Danube valley and the centre line of the river represents the international border between the two countries. Croatia disagrees and claims that the international border lies along the boundaries of the cadastral municipalities located along the river—departing from the course at several points—reflecting the course of the Danube which existed in the 19th century before meandering and hydraulic engineering works altered its course. As a result, Croatia claims a large part of the disputed area controlled by Serbia, while Serbia does not claim the much smaller parts controlled by Croatia.

The area is about 700 hectares (1,700 acres)—about the size of Gibraltar—and most of it is covered in forest with no residents. A journalist from the Czech newspaper Parlamentní listy, who visited the area in April 2015, found a house that had been abandoned for about thirty years, according to people living in the vicinity. The access road was reported to be in a bad condition. The Danube, an international waterway with free access to the Black Sea for several landlocked nations, runs along the area.

== History ==
=== Proclamation ===
Yellow-colored areas to the east of the river are claimed by both Serbia and Croatia. Green areas to the west of the river are claimed by neither (Croatia asserts that the green parts are part of Serbia, but Serbia does not claim them). This led Jedlička to assert that the green parts have remained unclaimed by both sides; the territory claimed by Liberland is the largest green-coloured land parcel, marked as "Siga" on the map.

Jedlička is a member of the Czech Party of Free Citizens, which bases its values on classical liberal ideology. According to him, no nation claims the land as its own, and he could therefore claim it using the terra nullius doctrine; the borders, he argued, respected both Croatia and Serbia's sovereignty. He had reportedly consulted Wikipedia's page regarding unclaimed territories, shown to him by his libertarian friend, in selecting a spot to proclaim the micronation.

The founders claim to have been inspired by countries like Monaco and Liechtenstein.

=== Attempts to access territory ===
Croatian authorities have frequently blocked access to the area since the beginning of May 2015. In May 2015, Vít Jedlička and his translator Sven Sambunjak were briefly detained by Croatian police after making an attempt to cross the border. Jedlička spent one night in detention and then was convicted and ordered to pay a fine for illegal crossing of the Croatian border. He claimed that there were at least three Liberland citizens inside the area, who came from Switzerland. Later that month, Vít Jedlička was detained again.

Initially, reporters were able to enter the area with Jedlička but subsequently they were also denied entry, including journalists from the Serbian public broadcast service Radio Television of Vojvodina, and from the Bosnian newspaper Dnevni avaz. The detained were from various countries, including the Republic of Ireland, Germany, Denmark, and the United States.

Croatian police have continued detaining people, including those that entered the area by boat (via an international waterway). One of them, Danish citizen Ulrik Grøssel Haagensen, was placed in house arrest for 5 days before being sentenced to 15 days of prison.

=== Repeated attempts at settlement ===
Flag of Liberland

In April 2023, YouTuber Niko Omilana—together with a collaborator—went past the Croatian border police using jet skis, entering the disputed territory to plant a flag. They were both confronted by a policeman who forced them to lie down on the ground and kicked them, but they were ultimately released. The footage was uploaded on YouTube in July of the same year, and received coverage in Croatian and Serbian media.

During August 2023, Liberland movement supporters and journalists managed to obtain unofficial access to the land parcel. However, this was brought to an end on 21 September 2023, as Croatian police launched an intervention. During the police action, some makeshift wooden buildings, which the Liberland supporters had constructed earlier, were taken down. Liberland supporters also complained about confiscations of property. Croatian police confirmed that they secured the location during the work with the demolition, and made three arrests, according to Dnevnik Nove TV. Jedlička was banned from entering Croatia and Gornja Siga for five years due to 'extremist activities'.

By November 2023, some supporters had returned to the territory, setting up camp on a river island adjacent to the Danube which lay within their claimed territory.

As of March 2024, Liberland had 1,200 registered 'citizens' who had paid up to $10,000 to obtain purported passports of Liberland, and 735,000 citizenship requests. People who accessed the claimed territory of Liberland and stayed for at least a week qualified for free citizenship status and was eligible to earn “Liberland Merits”, a Liberlander cryptocurrency, if they helped with construction on the territory, which included 'Liberland's first house'. More than 200 people successfully accessed the territory during Jedlička's attempt to land on Liberland in March.

== Public reactions ==
Journalists have been uncertain as to how serious Jedlička is about his claims, with some calling it a publicity stunt. On 20 May 2015, Petr Mach, the leader of the Party of Free Citizens, expressed support for the creation of a state based on ideas of freedom, adding that the Party of Free Citizens wants the Czech Republic to become a similarly free country. Goran Vojković, professor of law and columnist from the Croatian news portal Index.hr, described Liberland as a "circus which threatens Croatian territory", and argued that there was a risk that Croatia's claim to control land on the other side of the Danube may be weakened by the attention that the Liberland project has drawn to the border dispute. In 2016, an article in Stratfor summarized the initiative as follows: "Liberland is a curious case because, in principle, none of the actors that could claim control over it seems interested in doing so. But this will probably remain a curiosity with negligible consequences at the international level."

== Business operations ==
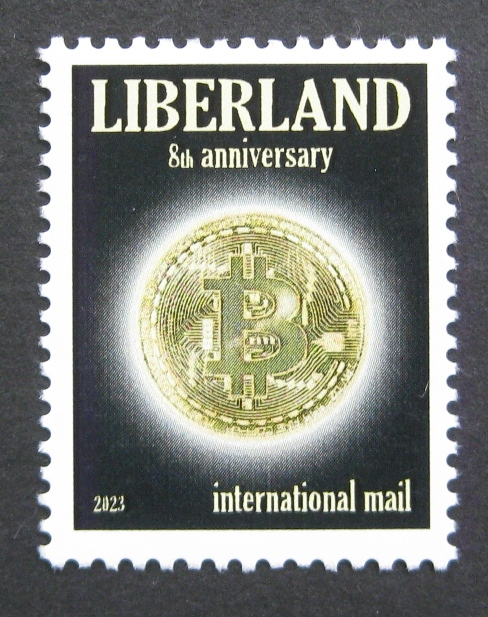
A postage stamp issued by Liberland, 2023

Liberland has been involved in several commercial operations, including the issuing of coins and postage stamps and various activities in the cryptocurrency industry. The micronation also relies on voluntary donations and taxation. Liberland reported $1.5 million in annual income according to financial reports released by Liberland in 2023. More than 99% of Liberland's reserves are held in the cryptocurrency Bitcoin, which policy experts stated as 'unwise'. Christopher Carr, a lecturer in cryptography and blockchain at Exeter University, stated that Liberland risked the same challenges El Salvador faced since it adopted bitcoin as a currency in 2021.

== Legal analysis and lack of diplomatic recognition ==
Both Croatia and Serbia have dismissed Jedlička's claims as frivolous. While the Serbian Ministry of Foreign Affairs considered the affair to be a trivial matter, it affirmed that Liberland did not infringe upon its sovereignty. In contrast, Croatia, which currently administers the land in question, has found the idea "provocative" and suggested bringing it to a stop even if by force; rejecting the idea that the land is terra nullius, it has stated that after international arbitration, the land should be awarded to Croatia or Serbia, not to a third party. The Czech Ministry of Foreign Affairs has also disassociated itself from the activities of Jedlička, finding them inappropriate, illegal, and potentially harmful, and has asked him to respect local law. Legal experts in both Serbia and Croatia have asserted that, under international law, Jedlička lacks the right to claim the area.

There has been no diplomatic recognition of Liberland by any member nation-state of the United Nations. Jedlička has visited another unrecognized republic, Somaliland, a self-declared state that proclaimed its independence from Somalia in 1991, and discussed mutual recognition with them. The micronations Kingdom of Enclava, Kingdom of North Sudan, and Principality of Sealand have expressed support for the idea of Liberland. Liberland has recently pursued closer relations with Argentina after the election of libertarian president Javier Milei, who previously mentioned Liberland at a convention in 2019.

== See also ==
- List of micronations
