= January 2017 Party of Free Citizens leadership election =

Czech political event

- 22 January 2017
- Turnout: 50%
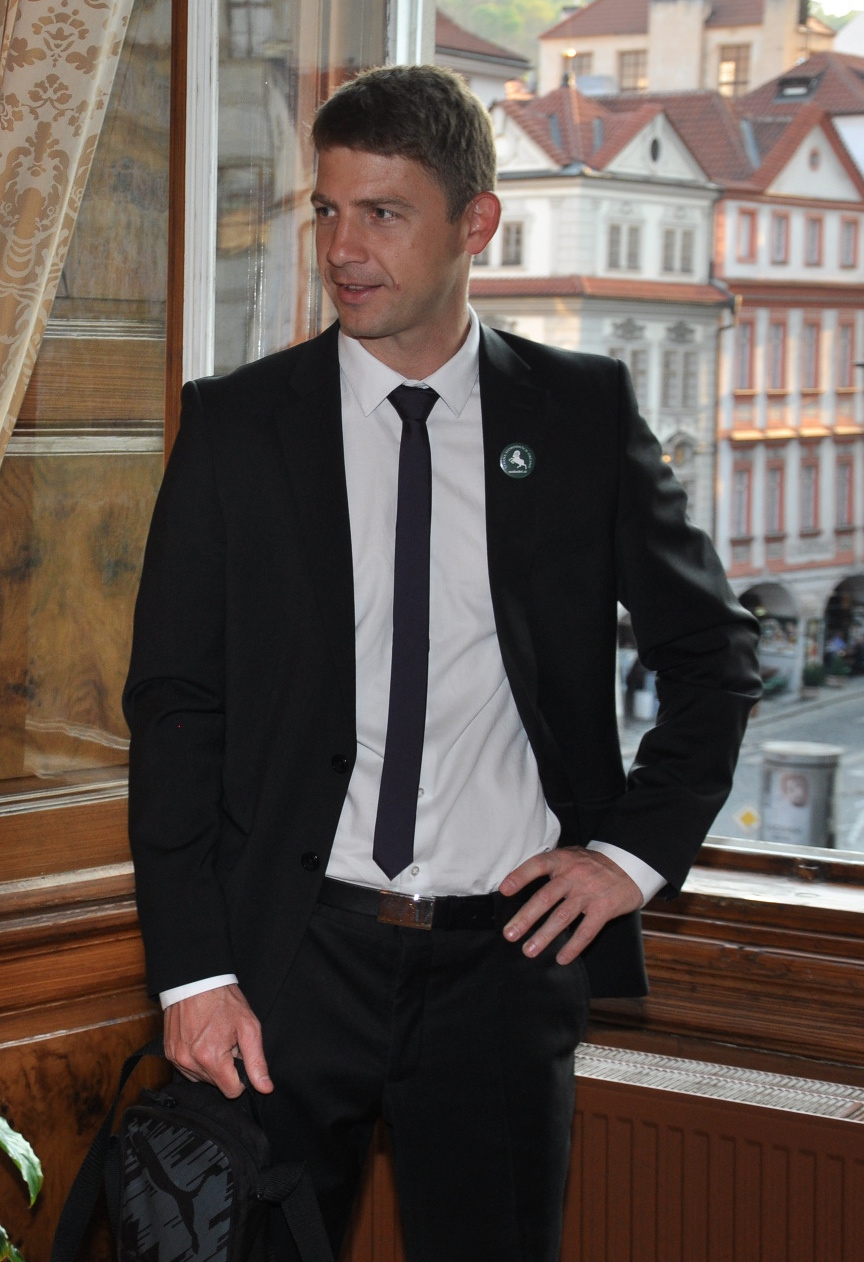

Candidate	Petr Mach	Martin Pánek	Irena Steinhauserová
Popular vote	301	128	32
Percentage	61.8%	28.3%	6.6%
Leader of Svobodní before election
Petr Mach
Elected Leader of Svobodní
Petr Mach

The Party of Free Citizens leadership election of 2017 was held on 22 January 2017. It was held after the incumbent leader Petr Mach resigned in December 2016. Mach was reelected when he received more than 60% of votes. Voter turnout was about 50%.

== Results ==
Candidate	Votes	%
Petr Mach	301	61.8
Martin Pánek	128	26.3
Irena Steinhauserová	32	6.6
Total	461	100
