= 2015 Party of Free Citizens leadership election =

Czech political event

- 23 November 2015
- Turnout: 58.2%
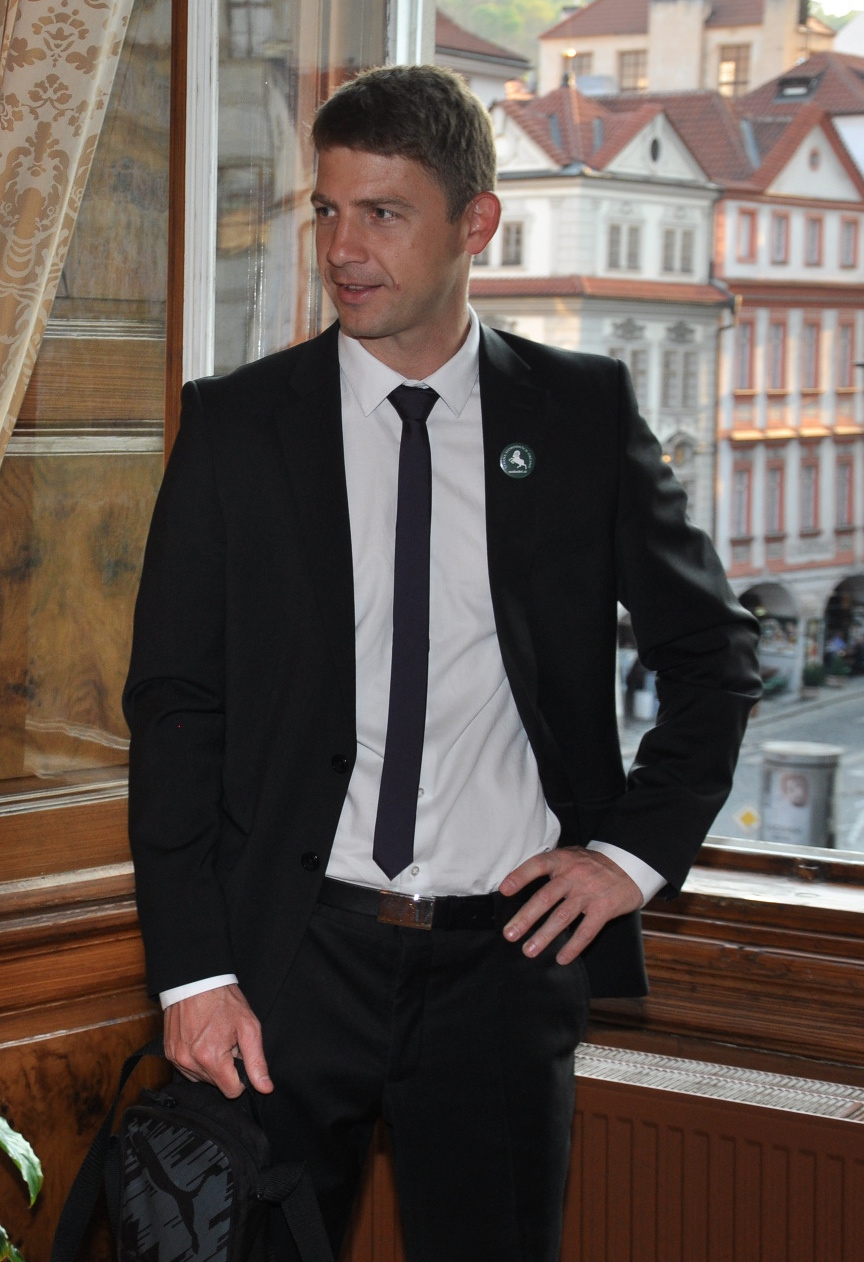

Candidate	Petr Mach	Roman Kříž	Petr Hampl
Popular vote	377	90	75
Percentage	65.7%	15.6%	13.1
Leader of Svobodní before election
Petr Mach
Elected Leader of Svobodní
Petr Mach

The Party of Free Citizens leadership election of 2015 was held on 23 November 2015. The incumbent leader Petr Mach was reelected. 574 members of the party voted. Mach received 2 thirds of votes.

Petr Mach ran for reelection. Petr Hampl was considered his main rival. Hampl was considered far-right candidate. Hampl suggested prior voting that Mach might falsify the result. Other candidates included Roman Kříž and Miloslav Bednář. Mach won the election and Hampl came third. Hampl then left the party which pleased Mach.

== Results ==
Candidate	Votes	%
Petr Mach	377	65.7
Roman Kříž	90	15.6
Petr Hampl	75	13.1
Miloslav Bednář	32	5.6
Total	574	100
