= Ladislav Jakl =

Czech musician, journalist, and politician (born 1959)

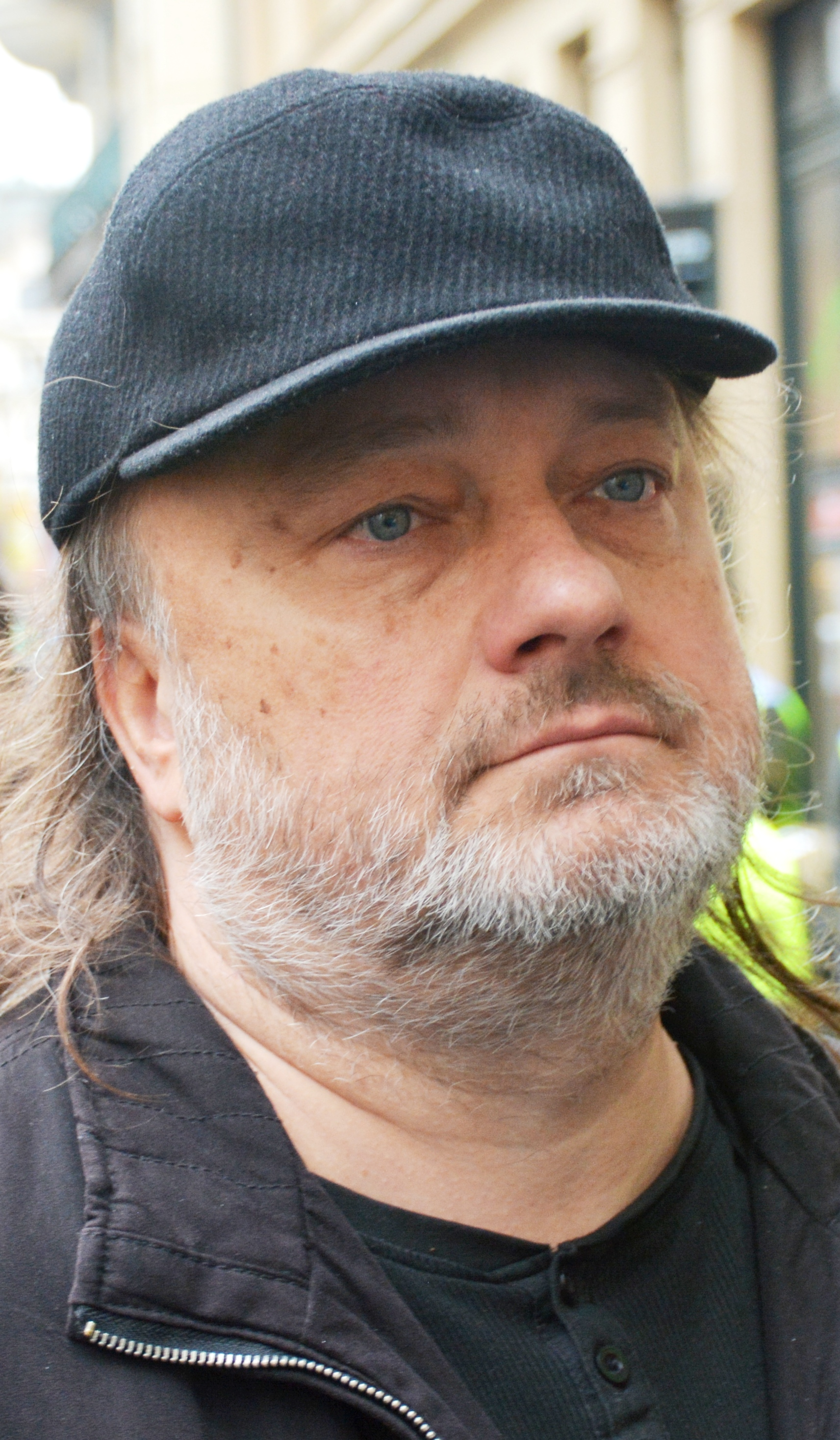
- Born: 17 December 1959 (age 66); Cheb, Czechoslovakia (now Czech Republic)
- Education: Charles University
- Spouse: Dana Jaklová (1984–2005)
- Children: Son Matej

Ladislav Jakl (born 17 December 1959) is a Czech musician and journalist who served as the Secretary for political affairs under President Václav Klaus. He also ran for the presidency in the 2013 presidential election as a candidate of Party of Free Citizens but he was not able to gather the required number of signatures.

== Personal life ==
He studied journalism at Charles University. He worked in different positions until 1989. He worked as journalist for Lidové noviny after 1989. State Security had a file on him a possible collaborator. He refused to collaborate according to his words.

Jakl was married to Dana Jaklová from 1984 to 2005 when the couple divorced.

== Political career ==
Jakl was member of parliament from 1990 to 1991. He was elected as a candidate of Civic Forum. He became collaborator of Václav Klaus in 1997. He became Klas's secretary when Klaus was elected president in 2003.

Party of Free Citizens offered him candidature for Czech president in 2013 election. Jakl participated in party's primaries and received 88% of votes he was the only candidate. Jakl didn't participate in the election because he failed to gather 50,000 of signatures and failed to meet requirements for registration as an official candidate.
