= Jindřich Rajchl =

Czech politician

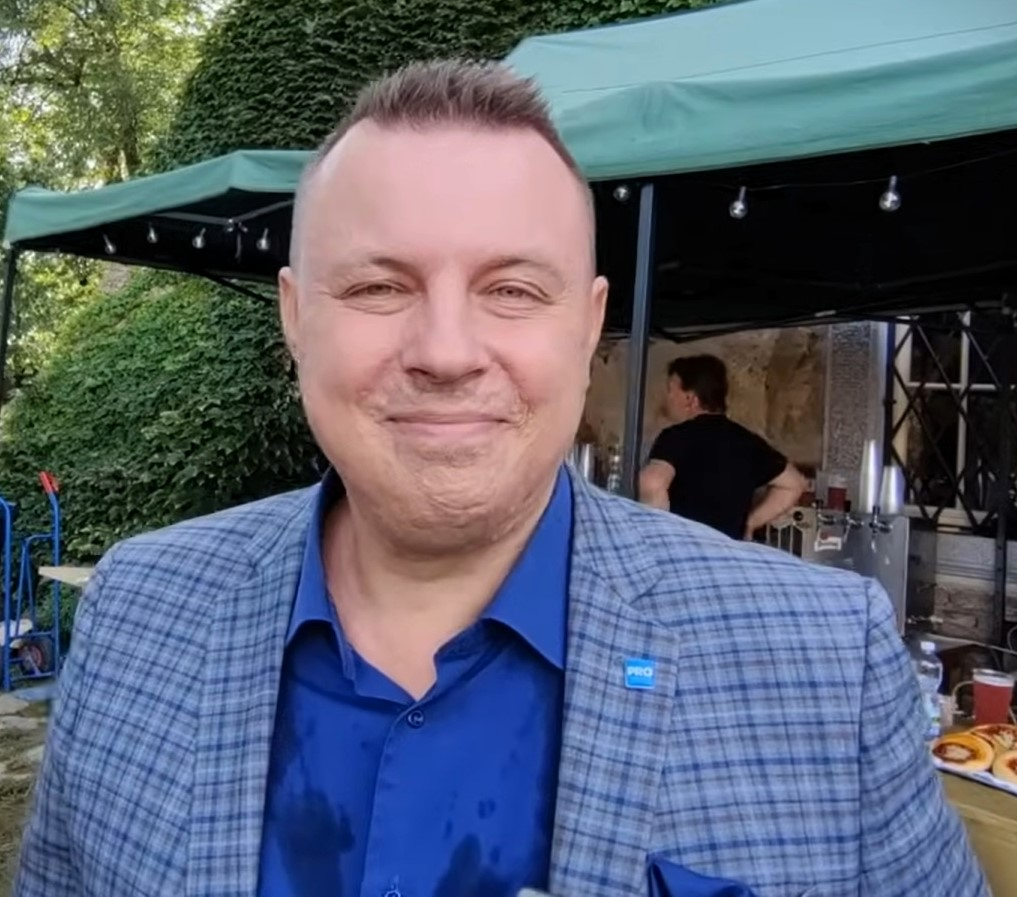
- Rajchl in 2024

Chairman of Law, Respect, Expertise
- Incumbent
- Assumed office 18 June 2022
- Preceded by: Position established

Member of the Chamber of Deputies
- Incumbent
- Assumed office 4 October 2025
- Constituency: Moravian-Silesian Region

Personal details
- Born: 27 September 1976 (age 50) Hradec Králové, Czechoslovakia
- Party: Law, Respect, Expertise (2022–present)
- Other political affiliations: Tricolour Citizens' Movement (until 2022)
- Children: Three daughters
- Education: Charles University

Jindřich Rajchl (born 27 September 1976) is a Czech political activist, lawyer and former football ambassador who was elected to the Chamber of Deputies of the Czech Republic in the 2025 parliamentary election. He gained a public profile as a leader of demonstrations against measures to control the COVID-19 pandemic in the Czech Republic, and subsequently also against the government of Petr Fiala. He is widely considered to be a participant in the spread of misinformation in the Czech Republic.

== Early life and career ==
Rajchl graduated from the Faculty of Law of Charles University in Prague. He was brought into football by František Chvalovský, executive director of the Czech club FK Chmel Blšany (2002-2005). Rajchl was associated with FK Dukla Prague, then became vice-chairman of the Football Association of the Czech Republic (FAČR).

In 2011, Rajchl attempted unsuccessfully to become chairman of FAČR, failing to gain the support of Roman Berbr, according to news server Aktuálně.cz. He was also linked to another football ambassador, Ivan Hašek.

Between 2011 and 2012, Rajchl was a member of the board of directors of SAZKA, following the company's bankruptcy and the sale of its betting business.

Rajchl worked as a director of the gambling company Bwin for the Czech Republic and Slovakia. However, the company closed the office in the former country during his tenure. He also operates two restaurants in Prague.

== Political career ==
As an activist, Rajchl spoke at multiple demonstrations against measures to control the COVID-19 pandemic in the Czech Republic and Russo–Ukrainian war.

Rajchl was a member of the Tricolour Citizens' Movement and ran to become a candidate in the 2018 Czech presidential elections, but suspended his bid before the election. At the party assembly in January 2022, he withdrew his candidacy to become party chair, with Zuzana Majerová re-elected instead.

Rajchl has been a key figure in demonstrations against the Cabinet of Petr Fiala. He is widely considered to be a participant in the spread of misinformation in the Czech Republic, including the COVID-19 pandemic.

In June 2022, Rajchl founded a new party, Law, Respect, Expertise (PRO), serving as its founding chair. The party is perceived by some critics as having a pro-Kremlin orientation. The PRO-supported candidate in the 2022 Czech Senate election was also endorsed by outgoing senator Jaroslav Doubrava, an open supporter of Vladimir Putin.

On 3 September 2022, Rajchl took part in an anti-government demonstration attended by 70,000 people. Several politicians, including Prime Minister Petr Fiala, characterised the protest as a "pro-Russian initiative". On 11 March 2023, Rajchl called a demonstration, "Czech Republic against poverty", during which protesters attempted to remove the Ukrainian flag flying outside the National Museum, where supporters of Ukraine had gathered. According to journalist Martin Bartkovský, a long-time analyst of anti-government demonstrations, this demonstrated the anti-Ukrainian focus of the event.

In June 2023, Seznam Zprávy included Rajchl on a list of people who make money by spreading fear and manipulation. He repeatedly predicted that a litre of fuel would cost up to CZK 150. Rajchl also reported the end of the company Kofola, which was in fact doing well. He later discussed this issue with Czech citizens, but Seznam Zprávy reported that the number of participants in these discussions had been overstated.

Rajchl also joined a protest by farmers in February 2024. Some farmers distanced themselves from Rajchl, and ended the protest early due to his participation. During the protest, it was reported that Rajchl physically threatened a young man who expressed disagreement with him.

Rajchl was announced as the lead candidate for the PRO list in the 2024 European Parliament elections.

He was elected to the Chamber of Deputies in the 2025 parliamentary election, running on the Freedom and Direct Democracy (SPD) list.

On 6 December 2025, Rajchl was reelected in a PRO leadership election as the only candidate, with 101 of 101 votes.
