= Vladimír Pikora =

Czech economist & entrepreneur (born 1977)

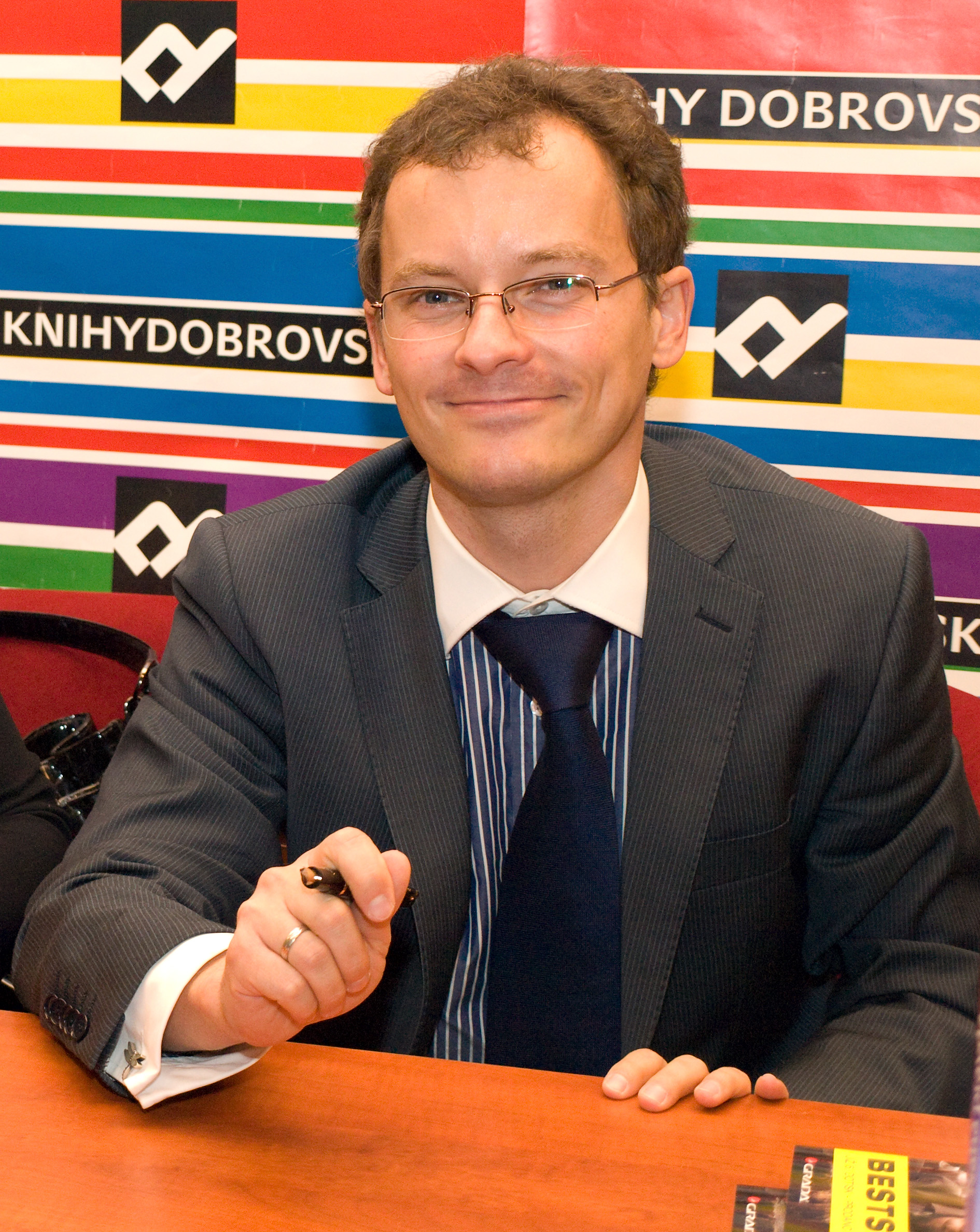
- Vladimir Pikora in 2012
- Born: August 3, 1977 (age 48); Prague, Czech Republic
- Education: University of Economics, Prague
- Occupation: Financial analyst / Economist
- Spouse: Markéta Šichtařová (div. 2025)
- Children: 7

Vladimír Pikora (born 3 August 1977, Prague) is a Czech financial market analyst, macroeconomist, and politician. In 2021 he established Pikora Invest as a family office.

== Career ==
Pikora graduated from the University of Economics in Prague, where he received his PhD. During his studies, he participated in a number of study visits abroad and successfully passed broker exams. In 2001, the B. I. G. agency awarded him for the accuracy of his forecasts. In 2005, the weekly Týden named him the most quoted Czech analyst in the media.

From 2000 to 2006, Pikora worked as the chief economist in Volksbank. From 2006 to 2022 he was the chief economist in Next Finance, s.r.o., consulting company, where he acted as the CEO and a partner. He has been a member of the supervisory board of Czech Export Bank (Česká komerční banka) since 2015.

Šichtařová and Pikora won the 2015 Magnesia Litera Award for their book, Lumpové a beránci.

Pikora was a candidate in the 2025 Czech parliamentary election for the Motorists for Themselves party. He was subsequently elected to the Chamber of Deputies of the Czech Republic as the lead list candidate for the party in Ústí nad Labem Region.

== Publications ==
- Všechno je jinak aneb Co nám neřekli o důchodech, euru a budoucnosti [Everything Is Different or What They Haven't Told Us About Pensions, the Euro and the Future], Praha: Grada (2011), ISBN 978-80-247-4207-6; co-authored by Markéta Šichtařová.
- Nahá pravda aneb Co nám neřekli o našich penězích a budoucnosti [The Naked Truth or What They Haven't Told Us About Our Money and Our Future], Praha : NF Distribuce (2012), ISBN 978-80-260-2811-6; co-authored by Markéta Šichtařová.
- Lumpové a beránci [The Villains and The Lambs], Praha: NF Distribuce (2014), ISBN 978-80-905564-1-6; co-authored Markéta Šichtařová.

== Personal life ==
He was married to Markéta Šichtařová, who is also an economist and the founder of Next Finance. They have 7 children as of April 2021. In 2022, they split. On 26 August 2024, in interview for Mladá fronta Dnes, Šichtařová accused Pikora of domestic violence, he denied the accusation and claimed accusation as pre-election campaign from Šichtařová. On 19 December 2025, Šichtařová announced on Facebook that they were finally divorced.
