= 2019 Tricolour Citizens' Movement leadership election =

- 28 September 2019
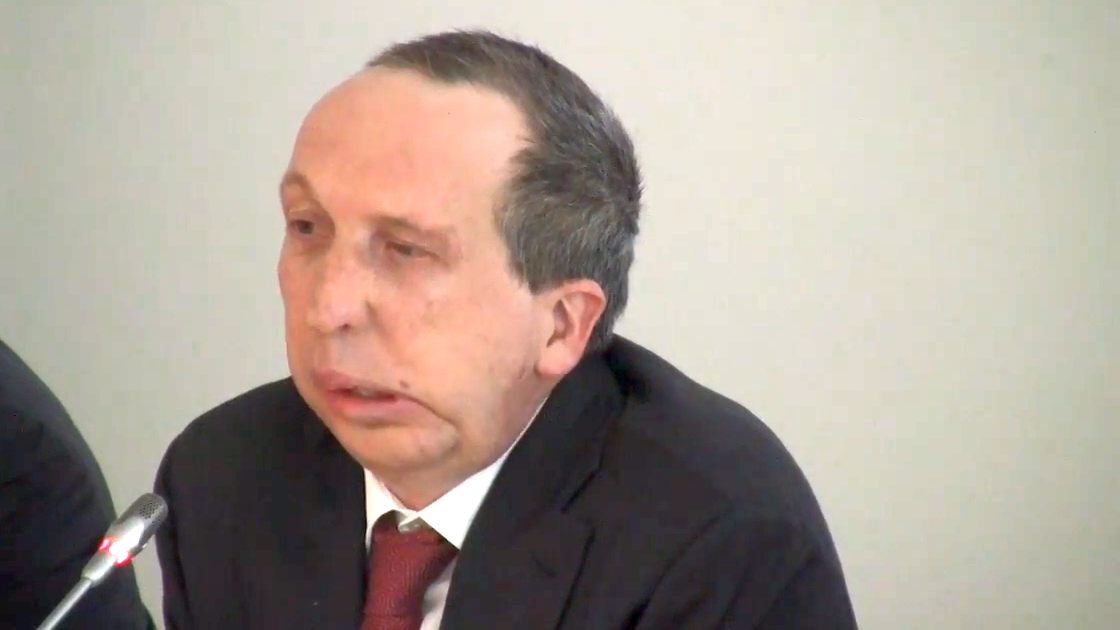
Candidate	Václav Klaus Jr.
Electoral vote	185
Percentage	98.4%
Leader of Tricolour before election
Václav Klaus Jr. (interim)
Elected Leader of Tricolour
Václav Klaus Jr.

A leadership election for the Tricolour Citizens' Movement was held on 28 September 2019. Václav Klaus Jr. the founder of the party was the only candidate. Election is held as party of party's founding assembly. Klaus received 185 votes of 188 and was elected the leader of Tricolour.
