= Center for Economics and Politics =

Czech think tank

Center for Economics and Politics (abbreviated CEP) is a think-tank based in the Czech Republic, founded by leader of Civic Democratic Party Václav Klaus in 1998. Other people involved with CEP include Petr Mach and Jan Skopeček. In 2013, CEP was merged with Václav Klaus Institute but still exists. It serves as a service organisation of Václav Klaus Institute.

CEP originally served as a think tank of the Civic Democratic Party (ODS) but separated from the party due to conflicts between Klaus and the party's leadership. CEP was then replaced by CEVRO Liberal Conservative Academy as the ODS think tank.
