= Markéta Šichtařová =

Czech politician, economist and entrepreneur (born 1976)

Markéta Radhi Šichtařová
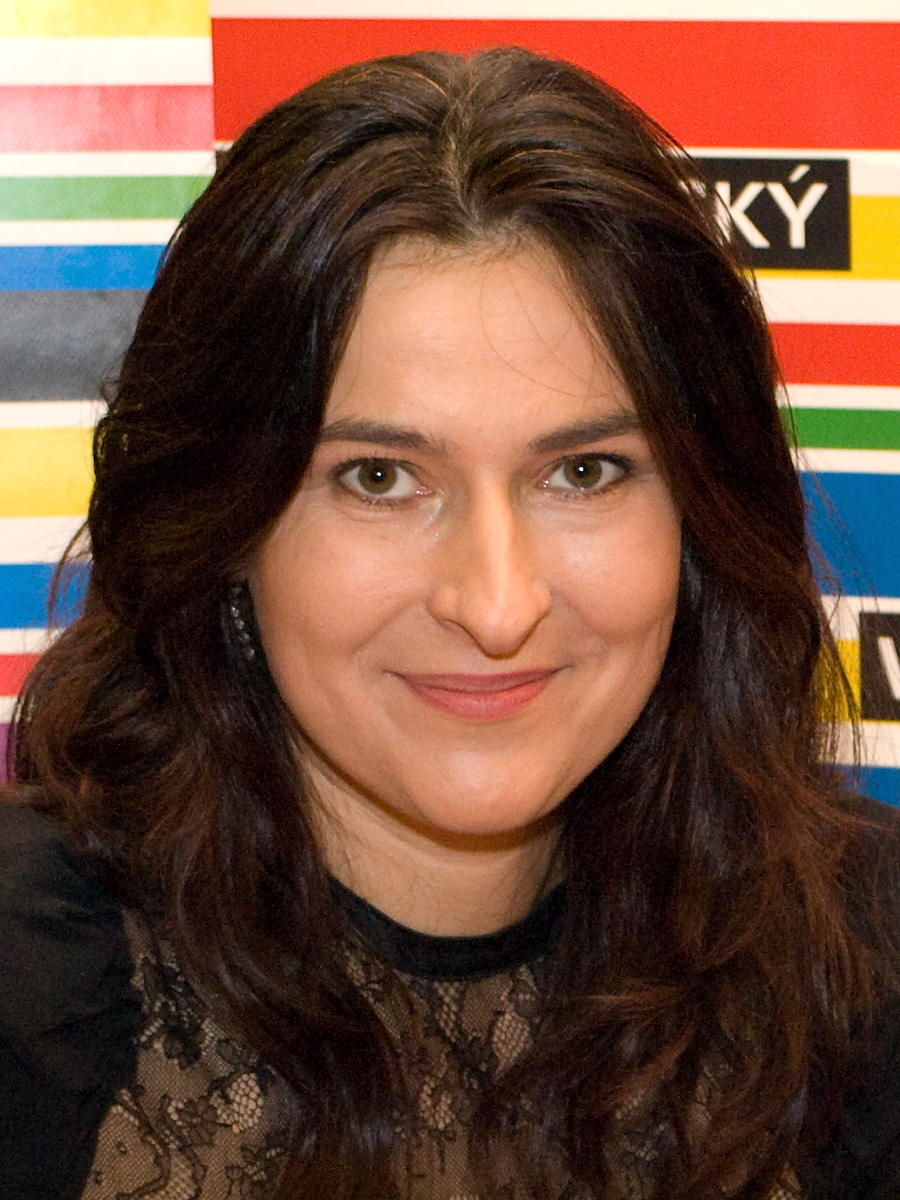
- Czech economist Markéta Šichtařová in 2012

Member of the Chamber of Deputies
- In office 4 October 2025 – 11 March 2026
- Succeeded by: Josef Nerušil

Personal details
- Born: Markéta Šichtařová; October 29, 1976 (age 49) Kladno, Czechoslovakia
- Party: Svobodní (2023–present)
- Spouse(s): Vladimír Pikora (div. 2025) Jakub Radhi (m. 2026)
- Children: 7
- Education: University of Economics and Business
- Occupation: Politician, economist

Markéta Radhi Šichtařová (born 29 October 1976 in Kladno) is a Czech politician, economist, author and businesswoman. From October 2025 to March 2026, she was a member of the Chamber of Deputies. She is the director of consulting firm Next Finance, which she founded in 2004.

== Early career ==
Radhi Šichtařová studied Economic Policy and Financial Markets, graduating from the University of Economics and Business in Prague. She worked as an analyst at Volksbank CZ, but left in 2004 to set up her own analytical and consulting company, Next Finance.

Radhi Šichtařová is also a blogger on iDNES.cz, and was named blogger of the year on the site in 2011.

In 2006 and 2007 Šichtařová served as the head of the economic advisory team of the Czech Minister of Finance, Vlastimil Tlustý.

== Political career ==
On February 26, 2025, it was announced that Šichtařová would lead Svobodní in the 2025 Czech parliamentary election. She was elected to the Chamber of Deputies on the list of Freedom and Direct Democracy. Šichtařová employed partner Jakub Radhi as her assistant.

Šichtařová's attendance in the parliament was low, and as of March 2026, she had not delivered any speeches to the parliamentary floor. SPD leader Tomio Okamura and vice-chairman of ANO 2011 Radek Vondráček called on Šichtařová to be more active in the Chamber of Deputies. She was also accused of using the premises of the Chamber of Deputies to produce and record investment advice videos, thus using her time as a member of parliament for private activities.

On 10 March 2026, Šichtařová announced her resignation as an MP on Facebook due to disagreement with the government approval of The Digital Services Act (DSA). In an interview with Seznam Zprávy, she denied that her resignation was related to her low attendance in the parliament or pressure from Okamura and Svobodní leader Libor Vondráček to resign. Libor Vondráček said he considered Šichtařová's justification for her resignation to be an excuse.

Šichtařová's initial resignation—submitted via formal letter—failed to meet the mandatory statutory requirements, and she consequently remained legally a member of parliament, as her mandate was not officially terminated due to procedural deficiencies. On 11 March 2026, she officially resigned from the position.

== Personal life ==
Šichtařová was married to the Czech economist Vladimír Pikora. They had seven children, as of April 2021. In 2022, they split. On 26 August 2024, in an interview with Mladá fronta Dnes, Šichtařová accused her husband of domestic violence. Pikora denied the accusation and claimed it was part of Šichtařová's election campaign. On 19 December 2025, Šichtařová announced on Facebook that they were divorced.

In March 2026, she married her partner, Jakub Radhi, changing her name to Markéta Radhi Šichtařová.

== Selected works ==
- Všechno je jinak aneb Co nám neřekli o důchodech, euru a budoucnosti (Everything is different: What they did not tell us about pensions, the Euro and the future), Prague: Grada, 2011, ISBN 978-80-247-4207-6; with Vladimír Pikora.
- Nahá pravda aneb Co nám neřekli o našich penězích a budoucnosti (Naked Truth: What they did not tell us about our money and the future), Prague: NF Distribution, 2012 ISBN 978-80-260-2811-6; with Vladimír Pikora.
- Lumpové a beránci (Rogues and Lambs), Prague: NF Distribution, 2014 ISBN 978-80-905564-1-6, with Vladimír Pikora.
- Zlatý poklad (Golden Treasure), Prague: NF Distribution, 2015 ISBN 978-80-905564-3-0, with Vladimír Pikora
- Jak to vidí Šichtařová (As Šichtařová sees it), Prague: NF Distribution, 2016 ISBN 978-80-905564-6-1, with Vladimír Pikora.
- Robot na konci tunelu: Zpráva o podivném stavu světa a co s tím (Robot at the end of the tunnel: Report on the strange state of the world), NF Distribution, 2017, ISBN 978-80-88200-04-8, with Vladimír Pikora.
