= Law, Respect, Expertise =

Law, Respect, Expertise Právo Respekt Odbornost
- Abbreviation: PRO
- Leader: Jindřich Rajchl
- Founded: June 2022
- Split from: Tricolour Citizens' Movement
- Membership (2023): 257
- Ideology: National conservatism Right-wing populism
- Political position: Right-wing to far-right
- National affiliation: SPD–Tricolour–Svobodní–PRO
- Colours
- Chamber of Deputies: 1 / 200
- Senate: 0 / 81
- European Parliament: 0 / 21

Website
- stranapro.cz

Law, Respect, Expertise (Czech: Právo Respekt Odbornost, PRO) is a right-wing populist political party in the Czech Republic.

== History ==
The party was founded in June 2022 by figures linked to Charter 2022, an initiative opposing COVID-19 restrictions and vaccinations. Lawyer Jindřich Rajchl, a former member of the Tricolour Citizens' Movement, became its first leader. The party largely focused on energy policy during the press conferences held to launch the party. In July 2022, the party announced it would nominate seven candidates for the 2022 Czech Senate election, including Hana Zelená and Ivan Noveský.

The party gained some media attention during August 2022 when Rajchl appeared in a Sanep poll for preferred Prime Minister, finishing fourth with 7.9%. On 3 September 2022, Rajchl and other prominent members of the party appeared at an anti-government demonstration on Wenceslas Square.

PRO participated in the 2022 Czech Senate election with seven candidates. Jana Zwyrtek Hamplová, who was endorsed by PRO, advanced to the second round and eventually won the seat.

After underwhelming results for both parties in the 2024 European Parliament election, PRO and Freedom and Direct Democracy (SPD) formed an electoral alliance with Tricolour for the 2024 Czech regional elections.

On 25 July 2025, deputy leader Ivana Turková left the party in protest against party cooperation with SPD for the 2025 Czech parliamentary election.

On 26 September 2025, leader of the South Moravian organization Michal Hašek, leader of the Karlovy Vary Region organization Michal Riško and leader of the Liberec Region organization Ludmila Křivánková left the party in protest against Rajchl's leadership.

On 6 December 2025, Jindřich Rajchl was reelected in a PRO leadership election, with 101 out of 101 votes, as the only candidate.

== Positions ==
The party has been labelled as pro-Russian, due to several PRO candidates calling for an end to sanctions on Russia, and Czech support for Ukraine. However, in April 2023, party vice-chair Petr Vack rejected this label, saying PRO considered Russia's actions against Ukraine to be "aggression" and "the conflict should end under the conditions of full respect for Ukraine's territorial sovereignty".

According to Rajchl, the party is inspired by the politics of Viktor Orbán and Robert Fico, stands against "the Green and Rainbow Inquisition", and represents national conservatism.

== Election results ==
=== Chamber of Deputies ===
Year	Leader	Vote	Vote %	Seats	Place
2025	Tomio Okamura	437,611	7.8%	1 / 200	5th
2025	Part of SPD candidate lists, which won 15 seats in total				

=== European Parliament ===
Election	List leader	Votes	%	Seats	+/−	EP Group
2024	Jindřich Rajchl	63,959	2.15 (#8)	0 / 21	New	−

=== Senate ===
Election	First round			Second round			Seats	Total seats	+/–
Election	Votes	%	Place	Votes	%	Place	Seats	Total seats	+/–
2022	27,048	2.43	11th				0 / 27	0 / 81	New
2024	1,828	0.23	33th				0 / 27	0 / 81	Steady
2026	15,026	1.30	10th				0 / 27	0 / 81	Steady

=== Local elections ===
Election	Votes	%	Seats	+/–
2026	264,280	0.24	28 / 62,178	
