= Tomáš Pajonk =

Czech politician

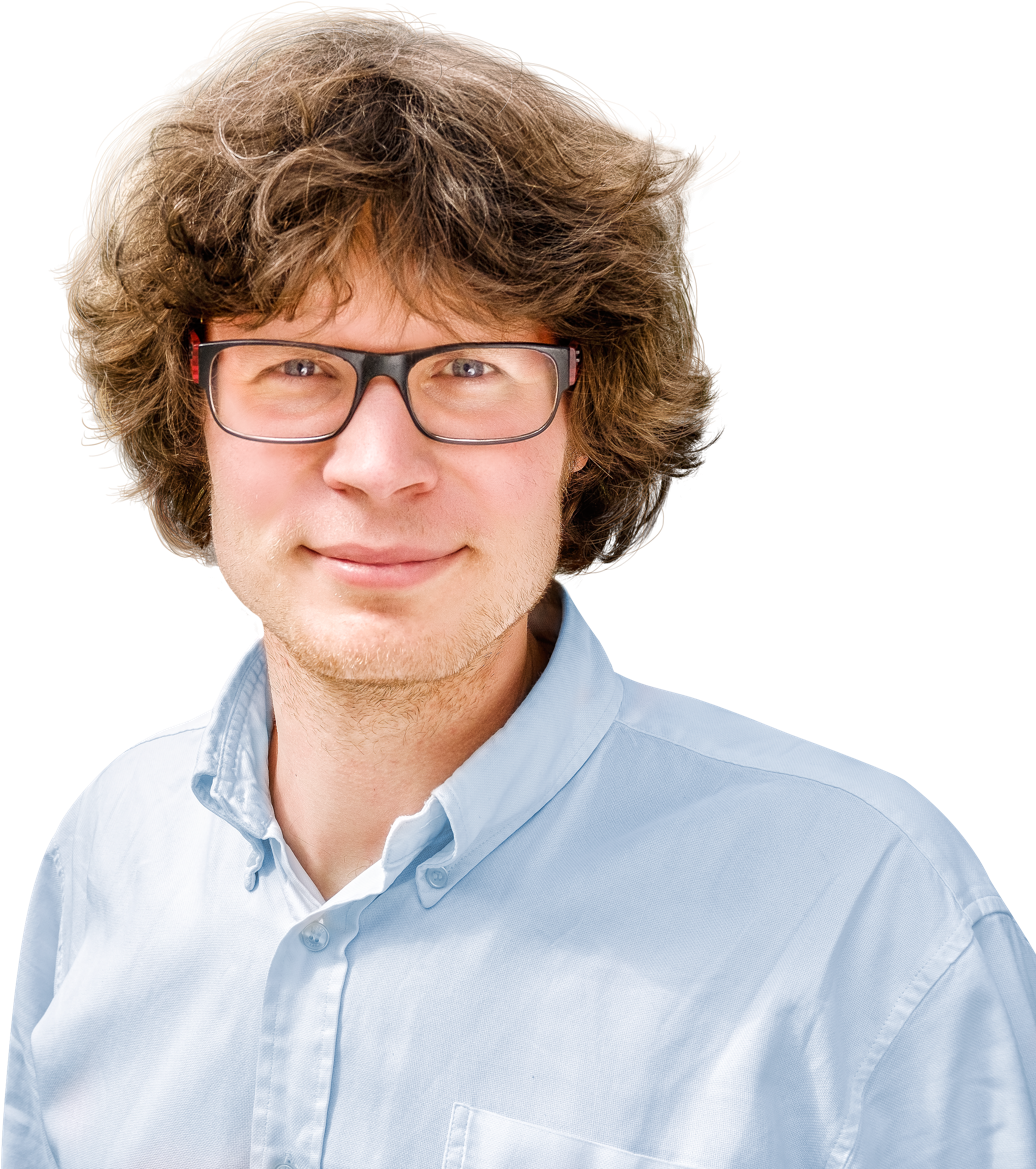

Member of the Regional Parliament for Zlín region
- In office 8 October 2016 – 8 October 2020

Leader of Svobodní
- In office 20 November 2017 – 17 October 2019
- Preceded by: Petr Mach
- Succeeded by: Libor Vondráček

Personal details
- Born: 11 August 1981 (age 45) Havířov, Czechoslovakia
- Party: Party of Free Citizens
- Occupation: Businessman, politician
- Website: www.pajonk.cz

Tomáš Pajonk (born 11 August 1981 in Havířov) is a Czech politician and businessman. He was the leader of the Party of Free Citizens from 2017 to 2019.

== Biography ==
Pajonk was born in 1981. He studied at the University of Economics, Prague. He later started his own business, and in 2012 he joined Party of Free Citizens. He soon became the leader of the party's Zlín regional branch. He stood in the 2016 regional election and became a member of the Zlín regional assembly.

Pajonk ran for party's leadership in November 2017. He received over 50% of votes and defeated the incumbent leader Petr Mach.
