= Tricolour (political party) =

Tricolour Trikolora
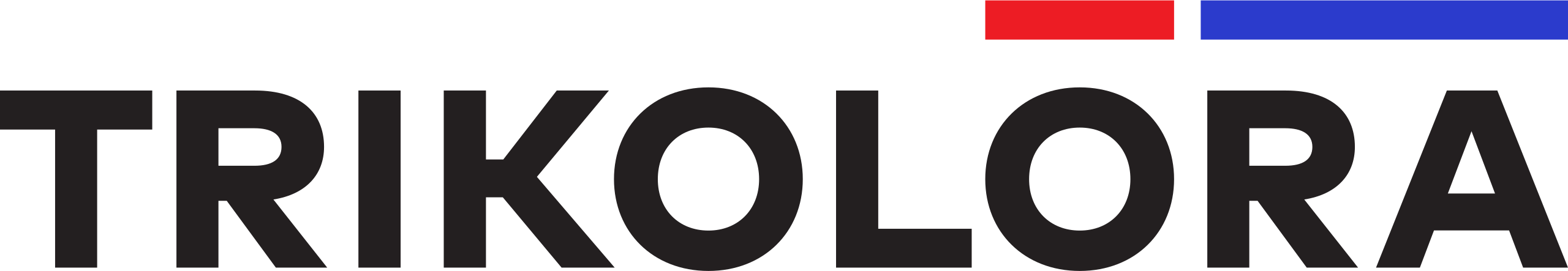
- Abbreviation: Trikolora
- Leader: Zuzana Majerová
- Deputy Leaders: Petr Štěpánek; Otto Černý; Pavel Hrouda; Zdeněk Koudelka
- Founder: Václav Klaus Jr.
- Founded: 25 June 2019
- Split from: Civic Democratic Party
- Headquarters: Hartigova 1964/210, Prague
- Think tank: Center for Civil Liberties
- Membership (2020): 1,774
- Ideology: National conservatism Fiscal conservatism Laissez-faire capitalism Klausism; Hard Euroscepticism
- Political position: Right-wing to far-right
- National affiliation: SPD–Tricolour–Svobodní–PRO
- Colours: Tricolour of white, red and blue
- Chamber of Deputies: 1 / 200
- Senate: 0 / 81
- European Parliament: 0 / 21
- Regional councils: 1 / 675
- Governors of the regions: 0 / 13
- Local councils: 7 / 61,677
- Prague City Assembly: 0 / 65

Website
- volimtrikoloru.cz

The Tricolour (Czech: Trikolora), formerly known as the Tricolour Citizens' Movement (Czech: Trikolóra hnutí občanů), is a hard Eurosceptic, fiscally conservative, and national-conservative political party in the Czech Republic.

The founder and the former leader of the movement is Václav Klaus Jr., a former member of the Chamber of Deputies who was expelled from the Civic Democratic Party (ODS) on 16 March 2019. The movement's chief foreign policy adviser is his father Václav Klaus, an economist, politician, and former President and Prime Minister of the Czech Republic. Klaus Sr. was also the founder of ODS.

The party contested the 2021 legislative elections as part of the Trikolora Svobodní Soukromníci electoral alliance.

== History ==
Klaus Jr. said that he began considering the founding of a new party when he was expelled from the Civic Democratic Party (ODS) in March 2018. In April 2019 he announced that he would present the name and ideology of the party in June 2019 after the European Parliament elections. His father Václav Klaus, former Czech Prime Minister and President, was said to be a member. On 28 April 2019, Klaus Jr. called on his supporters on Facebook to help him choose the name of the party, pledging that he would buy a bottle for the winner. Many suggestions were satirical, such as Klaus Klaus Klan (a reference to the Ku Klux Klan), Party of Free Common Sense (Strana Svobodného Selského Rozumu – SSSR, a reference to the Union of Soviet Socialist Republics) or Klaustrophobia. Serious suggestions included the Patriotic Coalition (whose Czech name "Vlastenecká koalice" would share Klaus's initials) or Nation Together. In early June 2019 Klaus Jr. registered the name Tricolour Citizens' Movement.

The party was presented at a press conference on 10 June 2019, with Klaus Jr. saying that Tricolour would "defend Conservative ideas of a normal world". The party had two MPs at that time, Klaus Jr. and Zuzana Majerová, who were both elected as candidates of ODS. Among the members of the new party were cardiac surgeon Jan Pirk, doctor and former MP Boris Šťastný, economist Markéta Šichtařová, former vice rector of the University of West Bohemia Ivo Budil and Jan Teplý Sr. Klaus Jr. commented that there were approximately another 10 MPs who were considering joining Tricolour. The press conference was attended by Civic Democratic Party senator Jaroslav Zeman, leading to speculation that he may also join Tricolour.

The party held its founding assembly on 28 September 2019. Klaus Jr. was elected new leader of Tricolour. He stated that the party would "fight its Marxist and Maoist enemies", and expressed the view that Tricolour was a party for young people, as "Conservatism is Punk for today." Tricolour was endorsed by some foreign politicians such as Nigel Farage of the Brexit Party (UK), Petr Bystron of Alternative for Germany, and Viktor Orbán of Fidesz (Hungary). Some Czech media outlets have compared Klaus and Tricolour to Dutch politician Thierry Baudet and his Forum for Democracy party. The party had registered 10,000 supporters at the time, who are intended to be converted into members of Tricolour. The party got its third MP in July 2020 when Tereza Hyťhová (elected for Freedom and Direct Democracy) joined Tricolour.

In March 2021, Klaus Jr. resigned as leader of the party for personal reasons. Zuzana Majerová became acting leader of the party. The party participated in the 2021 legislative election in an alliance with Svobodní and the Freeholder Party of the Czech Republic, known as Trikolora Svobodní Soukromníci, but failed to meet the 5% voting threshold. Soukromníci announced on 7 April 2022 that the party was ending its cooperation with Tricolour. Zahradníková and Svobodní leader Libor Vondráček confirmed that the Trikolora Svobodní Soukromníci alliance was no longer in operation.

In June 2023, the party agreed to a cooperation agreement with Freedom and Direct Democracy for the 2024 European Parliament election in the Czech Republic, as well as 2024 regional and Czech Senate elections.

== Ideology ==
The program of the party is based on three main "pillars":

- Prioritising the Czech Republic and its citizens over the rest of the world.
- The view that the wealth of the Czech Republic was created by the free enterprise of its citizens and companies, rather than government regulation.
- The defence of conservative values and "common sense".

The party has since published further policies, under the slogan Let's give the people back their country. The policies include improving the Czech education system, simplifying the tax code, assistance for young people and the elderly, support for the Czech military and police forces, prioritising Czech law over European law, and opposing "mass and uncontrolled immigration". The party supports Czech membership of NATO, but wants to reduce the power of the European Union, and supports a Europe "based on cooperation between free, independent nation states as opposed to a power centralized around Brussels", stating that the Czech parliament must not be "just a subordinate body approving laws written elsewhere".

The party takes a negative stance towards LGBT rights (the legalization of same-sex marriage and adoption by same-sex couples, official gender change without prior surgical intervention), and is sceptical of human influence on climate change, opposing measures to address it. The party supports the preservation of so-called traditional values, patriotism, the free market, a state with minimal competencies, the reduction of the welfare state, and the abolition of subsidies for non-profit organizations.

== Organisation ==
=== Membership ===
As of 28 September 2019, the party had 240 members and 10,000 registered supporters.

=== Leaders ===
No.	Name	Photo	Since	Until
1	Václav Klaus Jr.		25 June 2019	23 March 2021
2	Zuzana Majerová		23 March 2021	Incumbent

== Election results ==
=== Chamber of Deputies ===
Year	Leader	Vote	Vote %	Seats	Place
2021	Zuzana Majerová	148,457	2.76%	0 / 200	8th
2021	Part of Tricolour–Svobodní–Soukromníci coalition, which won no seats				
2025	Tomio Okamura	437,611	7.8%	1 / 200	5th
2025	Part of SPD candidate lists, which won 15 seats in total				

=== European Parliament ===
Election	List leader	Votes	%	Seats	+/−	EP Group
2024 (Note: Run in a joint list with SPD.)	Petr Mach	170,172	5.73 (#7)	0 / 21	New	−
