= Václav Klaus Jr. =

Czech teacher and politician

- Klaus in 2017

Leader of the Tricolour Citizens' Movement
- In office 25 June 2019 – 24 March 2021
- Preceded by: Position established
- Succeeded by: Zuzana Majerová

Member of the Chamber of Deputies
- In office 21 October 2017 – 21 October 2021

Personal details
- Born: 10 September 1969 (age 57) Prague, Czechoslovakia
- Party: ODS (2002–2008, 2016–2019); Trikolóra (2019–2021)
- Spouse(s): Kamila Pojslová (m. 1995; div. 2010) Lucie Hřebáčková (m. 2014; div. 2017)
- Children: 4
- Parent(s): Václav Klaus; Livia Klausová
- Education: Charles University

Václav Klaus Jr. (Czech: Václav Klaus ml. or mladší, Czech pronunciation: [ˈvaːtslaf ˈklaus (ˈmlat.ʃiː)]; born 10 September 1969) is a Czech teacher and politician. He was a member of the Civic Democratic Party (ODS) until his expulsion in March 2019. Klaus was a Member of the Chamber of Deputies (MP) from 2017 to 2021. He is the son of former Czech president Václav Klaus.

== Early life and career ==
Klaus became Headmaster of PORG Grammar School in 1998. During his tenure, the school had the best results in the country in 2011 state graduation exams. He left the school in 2014. He was also an adviser to Education Minister Josef Dobeš at the time.

== Political career ==
=== Education adviser to ODS ===
In March 2014, Klaus became chief education adviser to the Civic Democratic Party (ODS). He was highly critical of Minister of Education Kateřina Valachová, and opposed her changes to the roles of school headmasters. He also opposed inclusion, and expressed support for a headteacher who banned the wearing of hijabs in her school.

=== 2017 legislative election ===
Klaus rejoined ODS in January 2016, having previously been a member from 2002 to 2008.

On 26 September 2016, Klaus announced his intention to participate in the 2017 legislative election. He won the nomination on 26 January 2017, supported by the Prague 6 ODS organisation. He participated in the legislative election in Prague, where he was third on the ODS candidate list, and was elected to the Chamber of Deputies with over 20,000 preferential votes, the second most of all candidates. He subsequently became the chair of the Education Committee.

Although he was suggested by some political commentators – including Petr Honzejk and Martin Zvěřina – as a potential future leader of the party, and possible rival to the incumbent leader, Petr Fiala, Klaus Jr. became involved in conflicts with the party leadership following his election to the Chamber of Deputies due to his controversial statements and his support for Ladislav Jakl during the 2018 Senate election. This resulted in his expulsion from the party on 16 March 2019. Zuzana Majerová also resigned from the party in response to Klaus's expulsion.

=== Tricolour ===
Following his expulsion from ODS, Klaus announced that he would found a new party. He introduced the party, the Tricolour Citizens' Movement, at a press conference on 10 June 2019. In March 2021, Klaus Jr. announced his resignation from all political functions for personal reasons.

=== Center for Civil Liberties ===
Center for Civic Liberties

On 21 January 2017, Klaus founded a think tank, the Center for Civil Liberties (Czech: Centrum pro občanské svobody), focused on civil liberties, economic issues, and education. Klaus said that his aim was for the institute to compete with the Václav Havel Library.

The Center for Civil Liberties supported local municipalities in the Šumava National Park in their campaign against new environmental protection laws which they believed ignored the local human population. Klaus stated that people are also a part of the environment. The think-tank organised a conference about the situation in Šumava on 16 March 2017.

The center was dissolved on 1 June 2021

== Personal life ==
Klaus married his first wife Kamila Pojslová in 1995, with whom he had three children. The couple divorced in 2010, and Klaus married his second wife Lucie Hřebáčková in 2013. They have a daughter named Eliška. On 25 October 2017, Klaus announced a divorce from his second wife. The announcement came only five days after he was elected to parliament, which led to speculation that the divorce was caused by his political activities. Klaus has a congenital cosmetic defect on his face.
