= Zuzana Majerová =

Czech politician

Zuzana Majerová MP
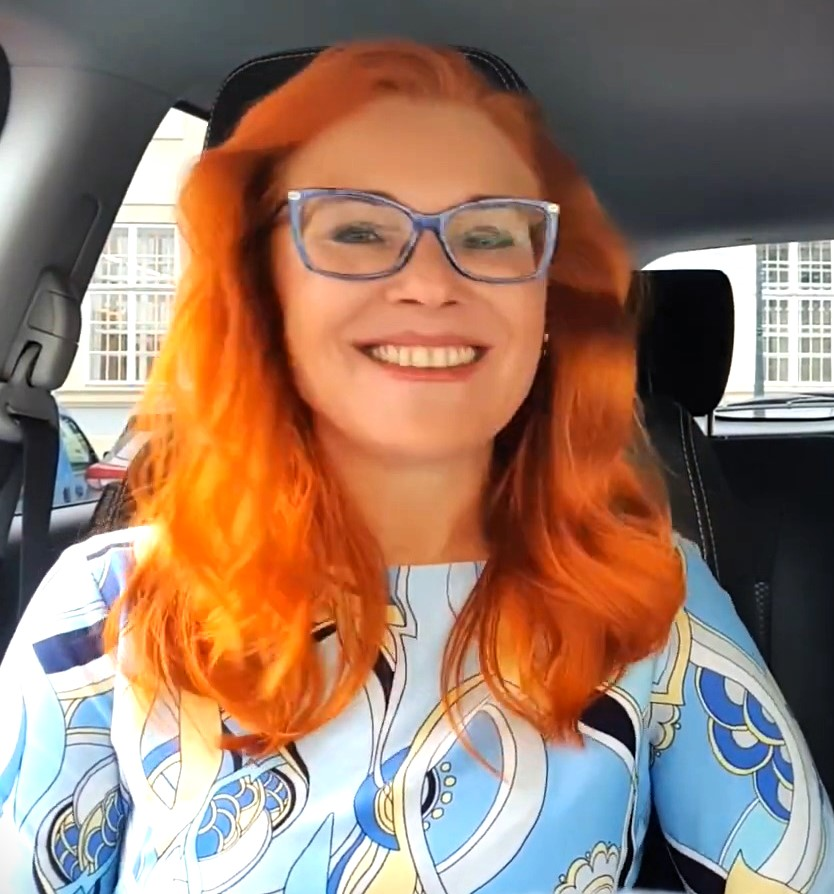
- Majerová in 2020

Leader of the Tricolour Citizens' Movement
- Incumbent
- Assumed office 29 April 2021
- Preceded by: Václav Klaus Jr.

Member of the Chamber of Deputies
- Incumbent
- Assumed office 4 October 2025
- In office 21 October 2017 – 21 October 2021

Personal details
- Born: Zuzana Dvořáková; 28 June 1972 (age 54) Olomouc, Czechoslovakia
- Party: Trikolóra (2019–present)
- Other party: ODS (2009–2019)
- Occupation: Teacher, translator, politician
- Website: zuzanamajerova.cz

Zuzana Majerová (née Dvořáková, formerly Majerová Zahradníková, born 28 June 1972) is a Czech politician. She was a member of the Chamber of Deputies from 2017 to 2021, and was re-elected in the 2025 parliamentary election. Formerly a member of the Civic Democratic Party (ODS), she has been president of the Tricolour Citizens' Movement since 2021.

Majerová was the #3 candidate on the SPD-Tricolour list for the 2024 European Parliament election.
