= Petr Mach =

Czech economist

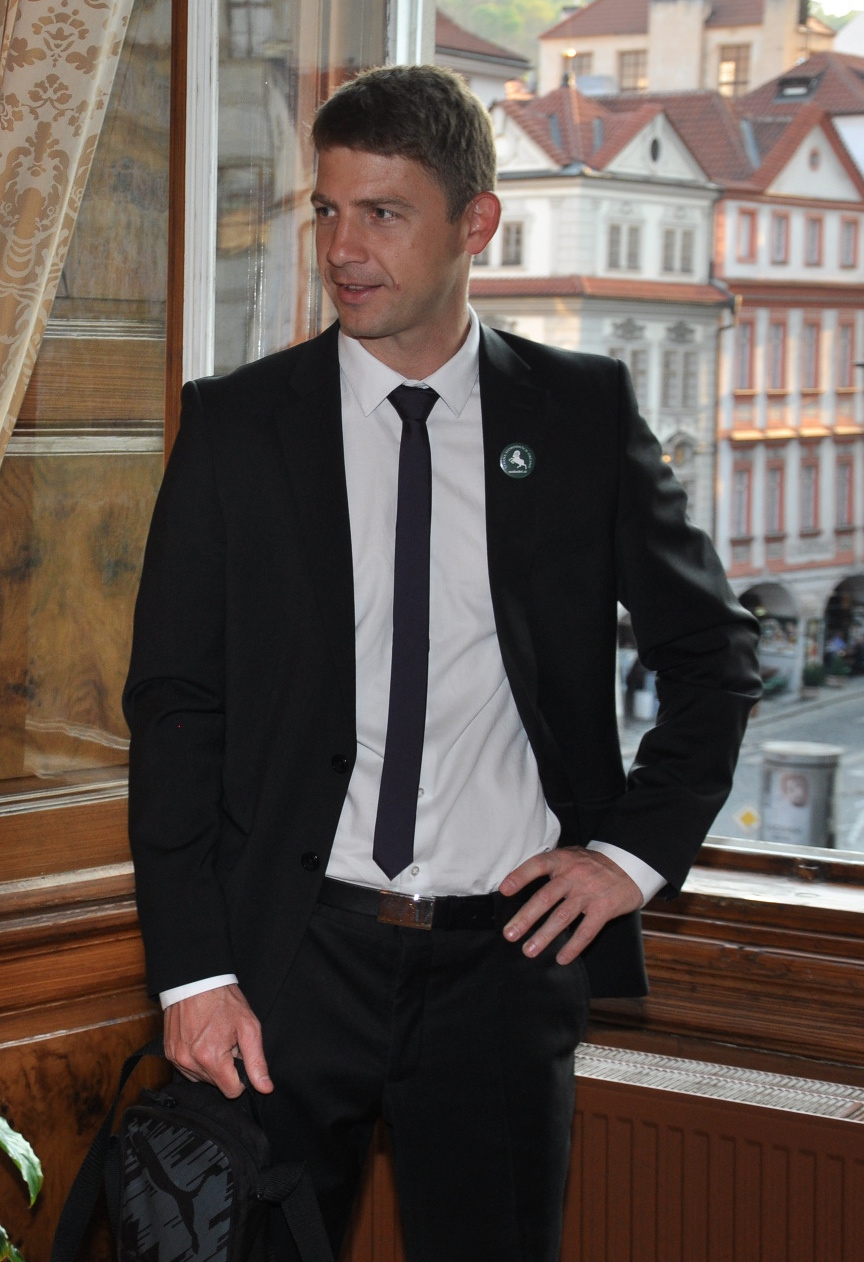

Member of the European Parliament for Czech Republic
- In office 1 July 2014 – 31 August 2017

Leader of Svobodní
- In office 14 February 2009 – 19 November 2017
- Preceded by: Position established
- Succeeded by: Tomáš Pajonk

Personal details
- Born: 6 May 1975 (age 51) Prague, Czechoslovakia
- Party: Freedom and Direct Democracy (2023–present)
- Other political affiliations: Civic Democratic Party (1997–2008); Svobodní (2009–2019); Tricolour (2019); Independent (2019–2023)
- Spouse: Andrea Holopová (m. 2014)
- Children: 2
- Occupation: Economist; Politician
- Website: petrmach.cz

Petr Mach (born 6 May 1975) is a Czech economist and former Member of the European Parliament. Mach is the founder of the Party of Free Citizens, which he led until 2017 when he was replaced by Tomáš Pajonk.

== Early career ==
Mach worked as an executive director of the Center for Economics and Politics in Prague from 1999 to 2009, and as an external economic adviser to Czech President Václav Klaus from 2003 to 2007, with whom he shares enthusiasm for the free market economy and euroscepticism. In 2003, Mach earned a PhD from the Department of Monetary Theory and Policy of the University of Economics, Prague.

== Political career ==
=== Party of Free Citizens ===
Having previously been chair of the Young Conservatives, the youth wing of the Civic Democratic Party (ODS), Mach left ODS at the end of 2007 after the party moved to a position of support for the Treaty of Lisbon. He established a new party, the Party of Free Citizens, in 2009, and was re-elected as party leader in 2010, 2012, 2013, and 2015.

In September 2010, Mach addressed the UK Independence Party (UKIP) annual conference and praised Václav Klaus for his opposition to the Lisbon Treaty. He addressed the UKIP party conference again in 2014 following their victory in the European parliament election.

=== Resignations and departure from politics ===
On 10 December 2016, Mach resigned as chair of the Party of Free Citizens due to disputes about party direction, but returned to the office and was re-elected party chairman on 22 January 2017.

Mach announced his resignation as a member of the European Parliament on 31 August 2017, stating that he wanted to fully concentrate on the parliamentary election campaign. He was replaced by Jiří Payne. Mach resigned as party leader in October after poor results in the parliamentary election, and finished second behind Tomáš Pajonk in the subsequent leadership election. In 2018, Mach decided not to run for election again and announced his departure from politics.

=== Return to politics ===
In September 2019, Mach was announced as a member of Tricolour, and addressed their party conference in Brno. He joined Freedom and Direct Democracy in 2023 and became the party's lead candidate in the 2024 European Parliament election, heading a joint list with Trikolóra. The alliance won 5.73% and one seat, which was taken by Ivan David.

== Political views ==
Mach is considered a libertarian, and argues for a lean state with minimal taxation. He is against the adoption of the Euro in the Czech Republic.

== Personal life ==
Mach is a member of Mensa Česko. He has been married to Reflex journalist Andrea Holopová since 2014.
