= Svobodní =

Svobodní Svobodní
- Leader: Libor Vondráček
- Founded: 14 February 2009; 17 years ago
- Split from: Civic Democratic Party
- Headquarters: Perucká 2196/14, 120 00 Prague 2-Vinohrady
- Newspaper: Beran Magazine
- Membership (2023): 333
- Ideology: Classical liberalism; Right-libertarianism; Libertarian conservatism; Liberal conservatism; National conservatism; Euroscepticism
- Political position: Right-wing
- National affiliation: SPD–Tricolour–Svobodní–PRO
- European Parliament group: Europe of Freedom and Direct Democracy (until 2019)
- International affiliation: Interlibertarians
- Colours: Green
- Chamber of Deputies: 1 / 200
- Senate: 0 / 81
- European Parliament: 0 / 21
- Regional councils: 0 / 675
- Local councils: 117 / 61,892

Party flag

Website
- svobodni.cz

Svobodní, formerly known as Party of Free Citizens or the Free Citizens' Party (Czech: Strana svobodných občanů) until 2019, is a classic liberal and right-libertarian, Eurosceptic political party in the Czech Republic founded in 2009 by Petr Mach, an economist and professor of macroeconomics. Prior to assuming his position as an MEP, Mach taught economics at VŠFS and VŠEM (two private business colleges in Prague). The party is led by Libor Vondráček.

Svobodní participated in the 2009 European Parliament election in the Czech Republic. Its platform called for a referendum on the introduction of the euro in the Czech Republic and the rejection of the Treaty of Lisbon. The party unsuccessfully negotiated with Declan Ganley to join his European Union-wide Libertas movement. Its symbol is the green outline of a ram's horns. After the 2014 European Parliament election, the party's MEP joined the Europe of Freedom and Direct Democracy (EFDD) group. Party is member of the Interlibertarians.

Several county councilors successfully ran on the party's ballot in the 2010 local elections as thirty-eight councilors held positions, primarily in towns and small cities. The party fielded candidates in the 2014 local elections, increasing its number of councilors. There are elected councilors in city districts (Prague 3, Prague 18 and Brno-Slatina) and towns (Chrudim, Hodonín and Kutná Hora).

In the 2025 parliamentary election, Svobodní contested under the banner of Freedom and Direct Democracy (SPD), with both Svobodní candidates elected to parliament. This thus marked the first time Svobodní entered the Czech parliament in Czech history. On 11 March 2026, MP Markéta Šichtařová resigned from parliament.

== Philosophy ==
The party may be described as libertarian, opposing high government involvement in the economy and personal lives and the centralization of political power. Its free market advocates often adhere to the Austrian School of economics. They aim to lower tax rates, restrict state redistribution of wealth as much as possible. The party believes that downsizing the government would leave less opportunity for corruption, a problematic issue in Czech politics. They also say that Czech sovereignty is indispensable for a true democratic system and they see the respect for state free-making decisions as an analogy of respect for human freedom.

== Election results ==
=== Chamber of Deputies ===
The party has contested four elections to the Chamber of Deputies, the lower house of Parliament.

Year	Leader	Votes	Percentage	±
2010	Petr Mach	38,897	0.7%	▲0.7%
2013	Petr Mach	122,564	2.5%	▲1.7%
2017	Petr Mach	79,229	1.6%	▼0.9%
2021	Zuzana Majerová	148,457	2.8%	▲1.2%
2021	Part of Tricolour–Svobodní–Soukromníci coalition, which won 0 seats in total			
2025	Tomio Okamura	437,611	7.8%	▲5%
2025	Part of SPD candidate lists, which won 15 seats in total			

=== European Parliament ===
Election	List leader	Votes	%	Seats	+/−	EP Group
2009	Petr Mach	29,846	1.3 (#11)	0 / 21	New	−
2014	Petr Mach	79,540	5.2 (#7)	1 / 21	▲1	EFDD
2019 (Note: Run jointly with Šťastné Česko (English translation "Happy Czechia"))	Vít Jedlička	15,492	0.7 (#13)	0 / 21	▼1	−
2024	Libor Vondráček	52,408	1.76 (#10)	0 / 21	0	−

=== Senate ===
Election	First round			Second round			Seats	Total seats	+/–
Election	Votes	%	Place	Votes	%	Place	Seats	Total seats	+/–
2010	5,447	0.47	15th				0 / 27	0 / 81	New
2012	15,588	1.77	8th				0 / 27	0 / 81	Steady
2014	14,508	1.41	11th				0 / 27	0 / 81	Steady
2016	4,568	0.52	24th				0 / 27	0 / 81	Steady
2018	2,884	0.26	24th				0 / 27	0 / 81	Steady
2020	9,297	0.93	17th	8,433	1.87	12th	1 / 27	1 / 81	▲1
2022	11,730	1.05	16th				0 / 27	1 / 81	Steady
2024	12,352	1.56	11th				0 / 27	1 / 81	Steady
2026	13,975	1.21	13th				0 / 27	0 / 81	▼1
