= 2025 Czech parliamentary election =

- 3–4 October 2025

All 200 seats in the Chamber of Deputies 101 seats needed for a majority
- Opinion polls
- Turnout: 68.95% (▲3.56 pp)
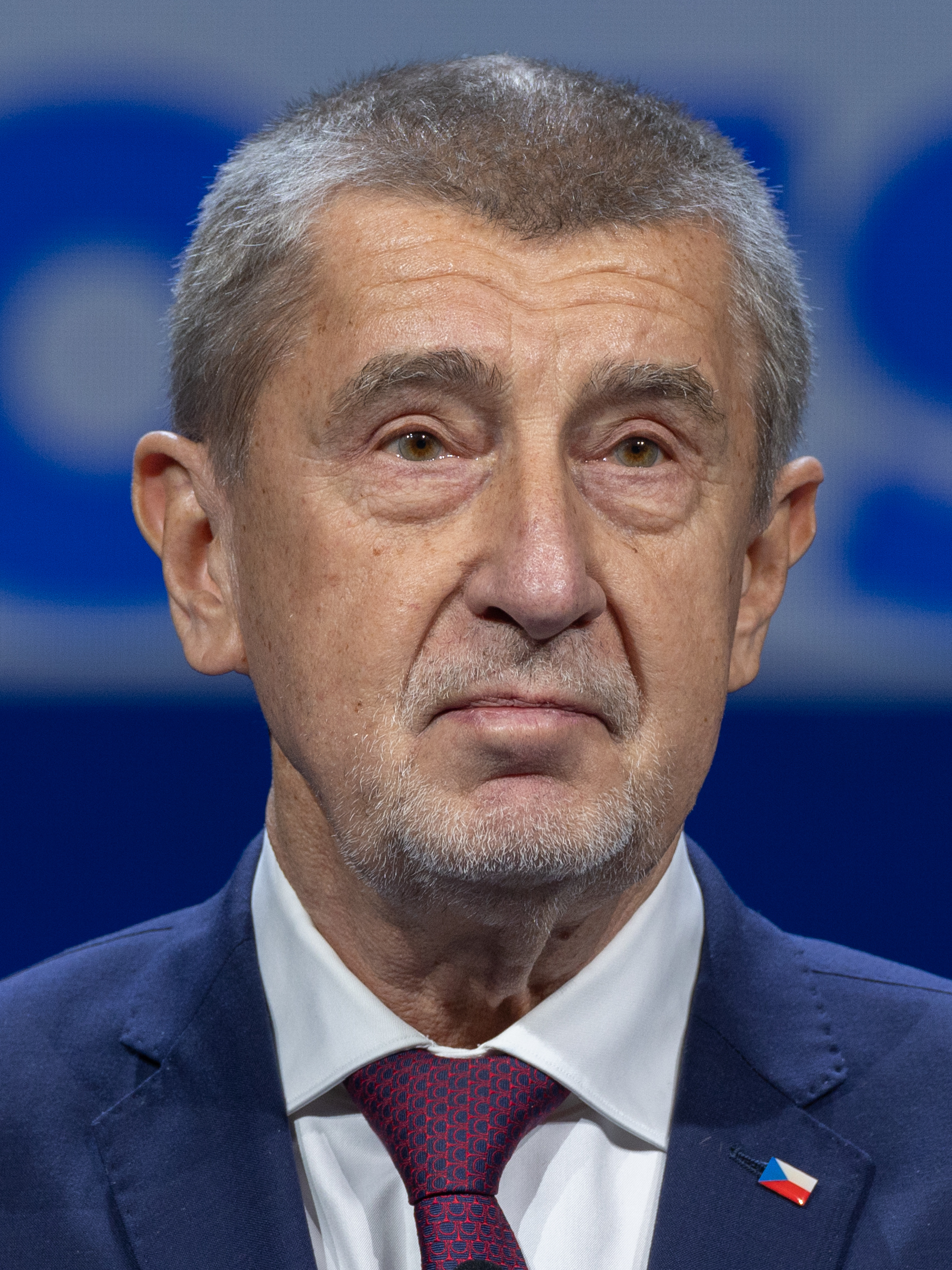

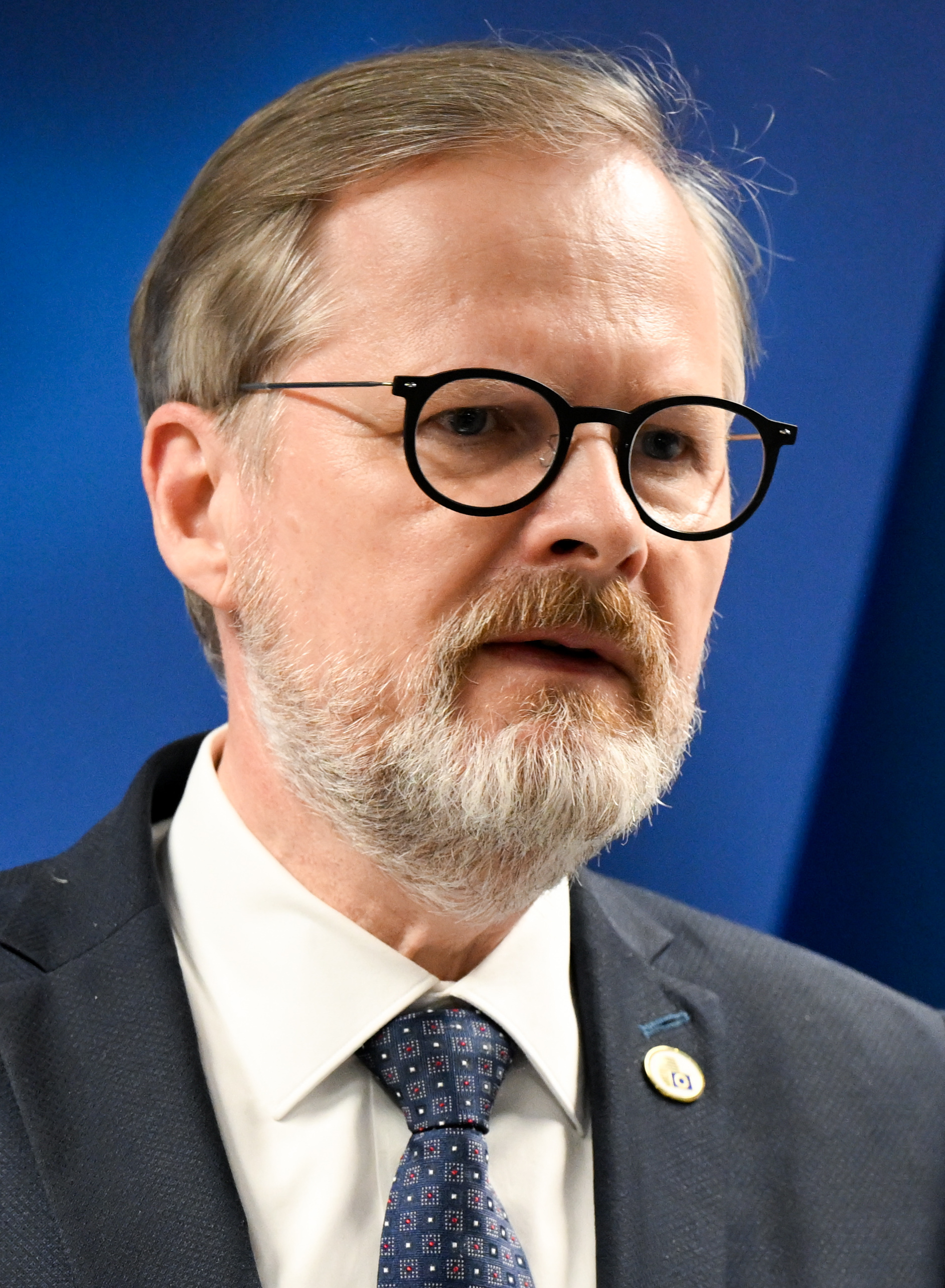

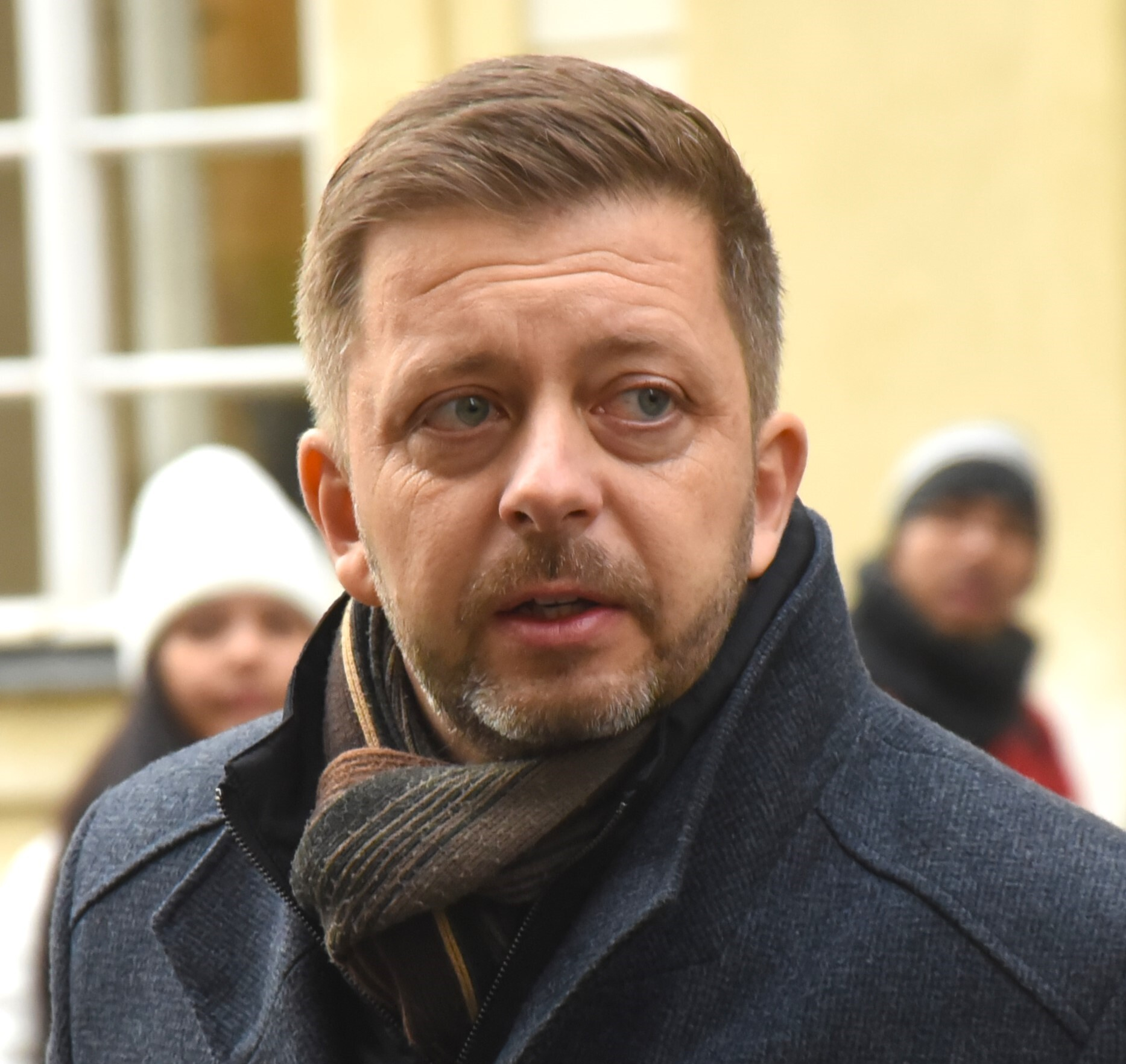

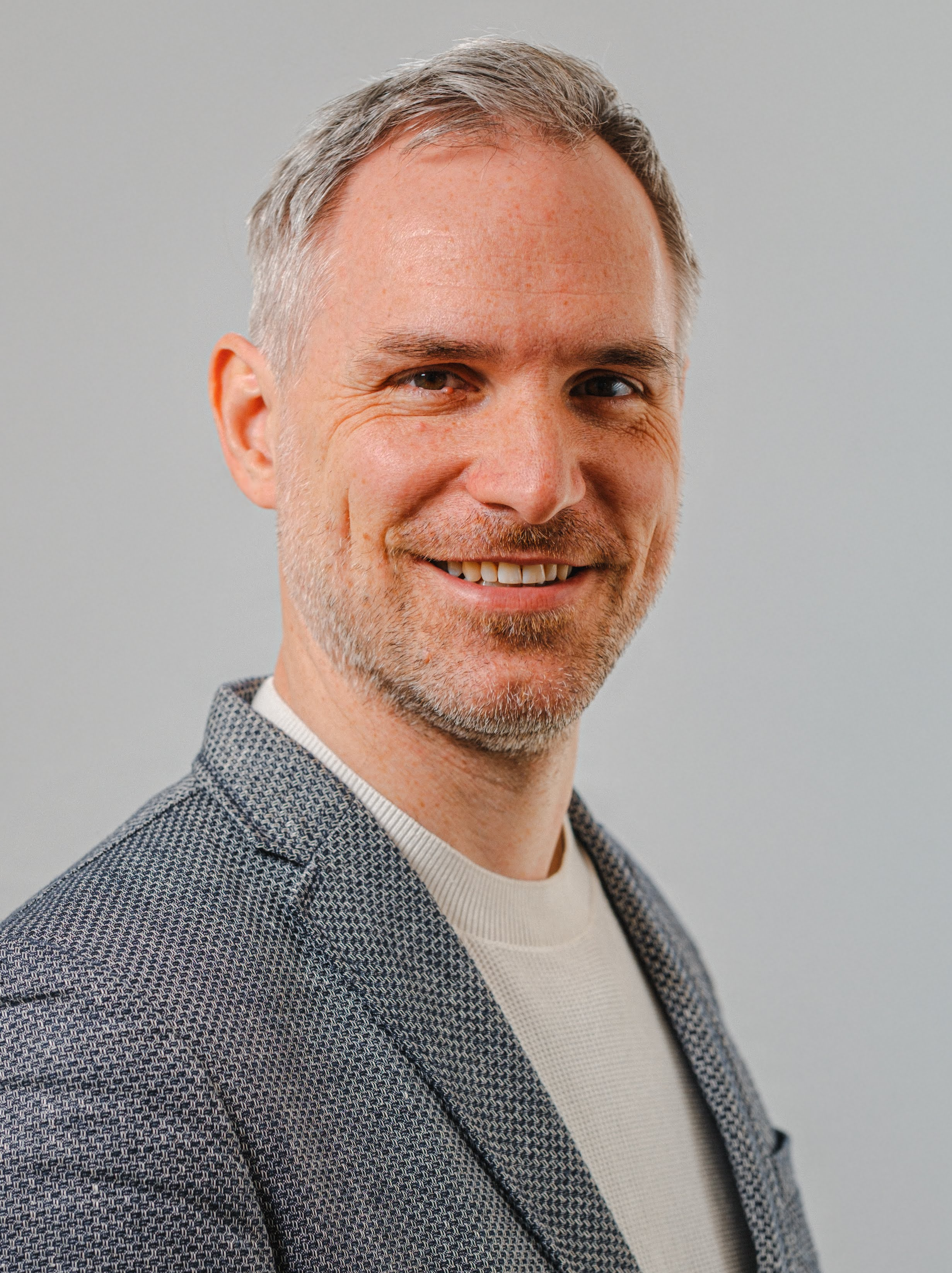

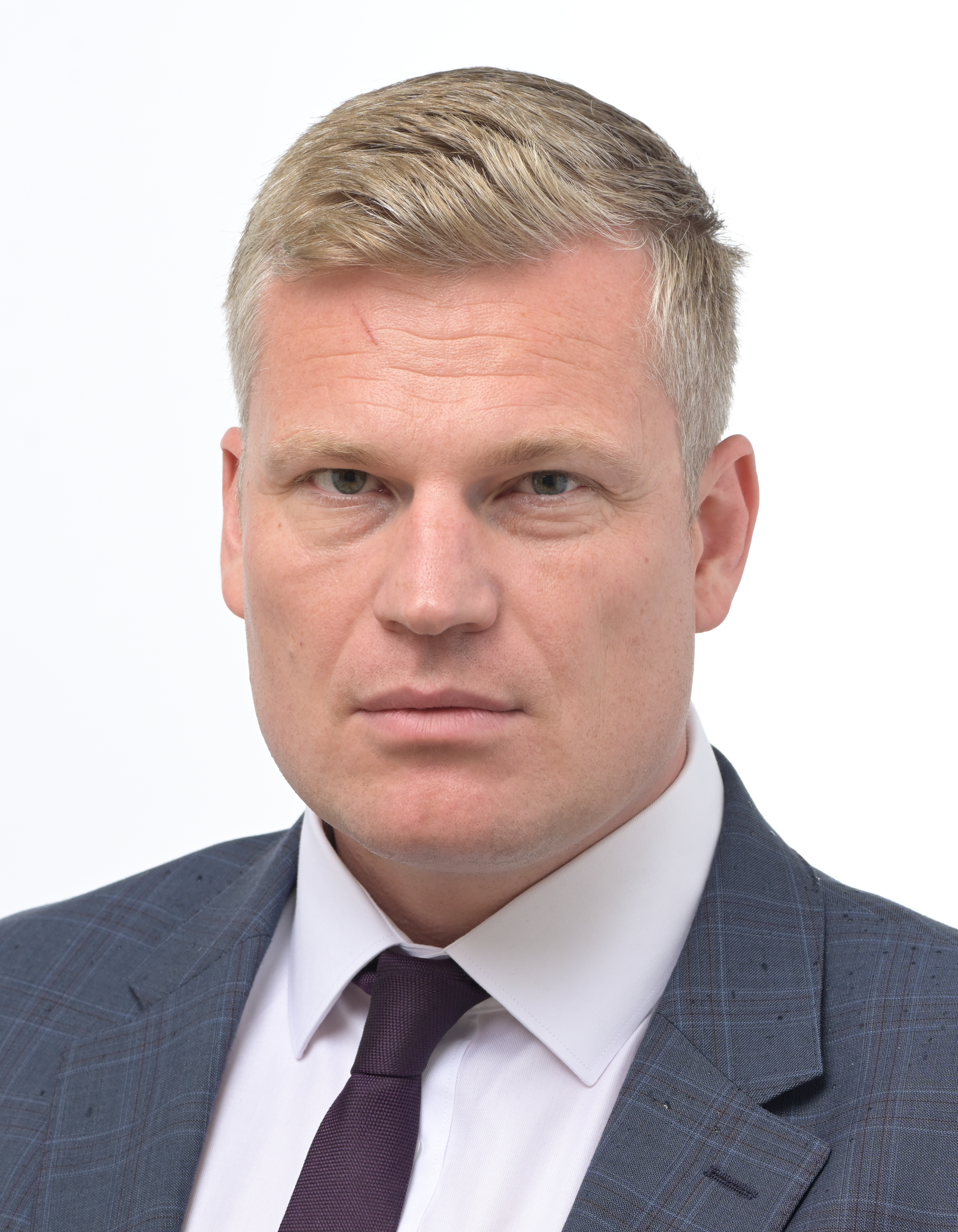
	First party	Second party	Third party
Leader	Andrej Babiš	Petr Fiala	Vít Rakušan
Party	ANO	ODS	STAN
Alliance		SPOLU
Leader's seat	Moravian-Silesian	South Moravian	Central Bohemian
Last election	27.1% 72 seats	27.8% 71 seats	15.6% 33 seats (Note: As part of Pirates and Mayors which won 15.6% of the vote and 37 seats in total.)
Seats won	80	52	22
Seat change	▲8	▼19	▼11
Popular vote	1,940,507	1,313,346	631,512
Percentage	34.5%	23.4%	11.2%
Swing	▲7.4pp	▼4.4pp	n/a
	Fourth party	Fifth party	Sixth party
Leader	Zdeněk Hřib	Tomio Okamura	Filip Turek (Note: Although Petr Macinka is the leader of the Motorists, the party's lead election candidate was their honorary president Filip Turek.)
Party	Pirates	SPD	AUTO
Leader's seat	Prague	Central Bohemian	Central Bohemian
Last election	15.6% 4 seats	9.6% 20 seats	Did not exist
Seats won	18	15	13
Seat change	▲14	▼5	New party
Popular vote	504,537	437,611	380,601
Percentage	9.0%	7.8%	6.8%
Swing	n/a	▼1.8pp	New party
- Results by district (top) and mandates by region (bottom)
Prime Minister before election
Petr Fiala
ODS
Prime Minister after election
Andrej Babiš
ANO

Parliamentary elections were held in the Czech Republic on 3 and 4 October 2025, to elect all 200 members of the Chamber of Deputies, the lower house of the Czech Parliament. The incumbent centre-right government of Petr Fiala was defeated after one term, with the populist ANO led by former prime minister Andrej Babiš returning to power as the largest party in parliament. The parties that formed the previous government lost their majority but performed better than polling suggested, winning 92 seats after being projected to win only 62–70 seats. ANO also performed better than expected, while the far-right Freedom and Direct Democracy (SPD) performed worse than expected based on polling. The left-conservative Stačilo! failed to enter Parliament. Babiš went on to form a coalition government with SPD and another right-wing party, Motorists for Themselves (AUTO). He was appointed prime minister for a second time on 9 December.

The main issues in the election were the economy, inflation, foreign policy and defence spending. The 2025 election marked the first time that mail-in voting was permitted for citizens living or stationed abroad.

== Background ==
=== 2021 election ===
Composition of the Chamber of Deputies
Party	Seats	+/– (vs 2017)
ANO 2011	72	−6
Civic Democratic Party	34	+9
Mayors and Independents	33	+27
KDU-ČSL	23	+13
Freedom and Direct Democracy	20	−2
TOP 09	14	+7
Czech Pirate Party	4	−18

The 2021 parliamentary elections saw the conservative alliance Spolu (consisting of the Civic Democratic Party (ODS), KDU-ČSL and TOP 09) finish first with 27.8% of the vote. ANO 2011 finished second and liberal alliance Pirates and Mayors third. Freedom and Direct Democracy was the only other party to win seats. Spolu formed a government with Pirates and Mayors with ODS leader Petr Fiala as Prime Minister.

Soon after the 2021 elections, the leader of the Mayors and Independents, Vít Rakušan, said that his party would run in the next elections as a single party rather than continue their alliance with the Pirate Party. According to internal Pirate Party analysis, the Mayors violated their joint agreement by asking their voters to give their candidates preference votes on the joint list, which resulted in just four Pirate MPs being elected.

=== 2024 European Parliament election ===
The 2024 European Parliament election saw losses for the ruling parties, as the Czech Pirate Party lost two of its three seats, and both the Civic Democrats and KDU-ČSL lost one MEP each. TOP 09 retained both its mandates and Mayors and Independents gained one, resulting in a net loss of three seats for the ruling coalition.

Among the parliamentary opposition, ANO 2011 gained one mandate compared to the previous election, and SPD lost one, just passing the parliamentary threshold. Most of the gains went to populist extra-parliamentary parties, with two MEPs each won by Stačilo! and the right-wing populist Přísaha and Motorists, whose leader Filip Turek had faced Neo-Nazism allegations just days before the election. The election also saw the worst result ever for Social Democracy, which won just 1.8% of the vote, far below the threshold.

=== 2024 regional and Senate elections ===
The 2024 Czech regional elections saw a near-total wipeout for the Pirate Party, the smallest party in the government coalition, which surpassed the threshold in just one out of 13 contested regions and lost all but four councillors nationwide. This led to the resignation of the party leadership and the party's departure from the Fiala cabinet. The election was also successful for the Stačilo! coalition, which entered 12 out of 13 regional assemblies, winning 40 councillors.

=== Pirate Party departure from the Fiala Government ===
Following the underwhelming results in the regional elections, several regional branches of the Pirate Party called for the resignation of the national leadership, led by Ivan Bartoš, who said that he would respect the results of an internal referendum on that matter; however, there were few calls to leave the Fiala Cabinet.

A few days later, Prime Minister Petr Fiala announced that he would propose the dismissal of Bartoš as Minister of Regional Development and Deputy Prime Minister for Digitalisation, due to Bartoš's failure to roll out the digitalisation of construction permits. Fiala asked the Pirate Party to propose a new candidate for Minister of Regional Development. This decision came as a surprise to Bartoš and the Pirate Party leadership. Bartoš stated that he had a meeting with Fiala earlier that day, where his dismissal had not been mentioned, and that he learned about his dismissal through a telephone call. The rest of the Pirate Party leadership expressed anger at not having been consulted first, as required by the coalition agreement.

Fiala later confirmed that he had announced his decision to Bartoš through a call. He said he hoped the Pirates would remain in the government, and that he had not broken the coalition agreement, as the whole Pirate's leadership resigned and remained as caretaker leadership until new leadership elections could be held. Pirate members then called for an internal referendum on leaving the government, which was supported by an overwhelming majority of members. The remaining Pirate ministers subsequently submitted their resignations. However, Fiala did not accept the resignation of Foreign Minister Jan Lipavský, who was asked to finish his term as an independent, as a joint nominee of all four remaining coalition parties.

=== Bitcoin scandal ===
The 2025 Czech government Bitcoin scandal, which arose after it became public that the Ministry of Justice had accepted a large Bitcoin donation from criminal Tomáš Jiřikovský, became a topic of the election campaign. The controversy led to the resignation of Justice Minister Pavel Blažek, who approved the donation without verifying its origin, sparking allegations of potential money laundering.

== Electoral system ==
The Constitution of the Czech Republic stipulates that an election to the Chamber of Deputies, the lower house of the Parliament, must be held every four years. The executive government is answerable to the Chamber of Deputies and remains in power only as long as it commands the confidence of the majority of its members. Article 19(1) of the Constitution states that any citizen of the Czech Republic over the age of 21 years old is eligible to serve as a Member of Parliament. All 200 deputies are proportionally elected on open lists in 14 electoral regions, which follow the borders of the 13 Czech regions and the capital city of Prague. Seats are distributed to the regions based on the number of valid votes in each region. Mandates are assigned using the largest remainder method, using the Imperiali quota in the first round and the Hagenbach-Bischoff quota in the second round. In the first round, mandates are divided between each region. Seats not assigned in the first round are then transferred to a national second round, where the sum of parties' remaining votes from all regions are used. To be eligible for seats, a single party must earn at least 5% of the national vote, a coalition of two parties needs 8%, and a coalition of three or more parties requires 11%, unless only one group makes it into the Chamber.

=== Postal voting ===
For first time in Czech history, citizens living abroad will be able to vote via mail-in voting, following an amendment to the electoral law in 2024. Several media sources, including Seznam Zprávy and e15, noted that the number of citizens registered for postal voting was far lower than the original estimates from the Ministry of Foreign Affairs.

=== Non-coalitions ===
Before the election, three candidate lists (the Stačilo! alliance; the joint list of the Pirates and Greens; and the joint list of SPD, Tricolour, PRO and Svobodní) were accused of creating "non-coalitions", as they registered as single party lists rather than coalitions in order to pass a lower electoral threshold. This practice was criticised by some other parties, political analysts from Seznam Zprávy and Reflex, and academics from the Charles University, who suggested that these "non-coalitions" were circumventing the electoral law.

== Campaign ==
=== Pre-campaign period and cooperation agreements ===
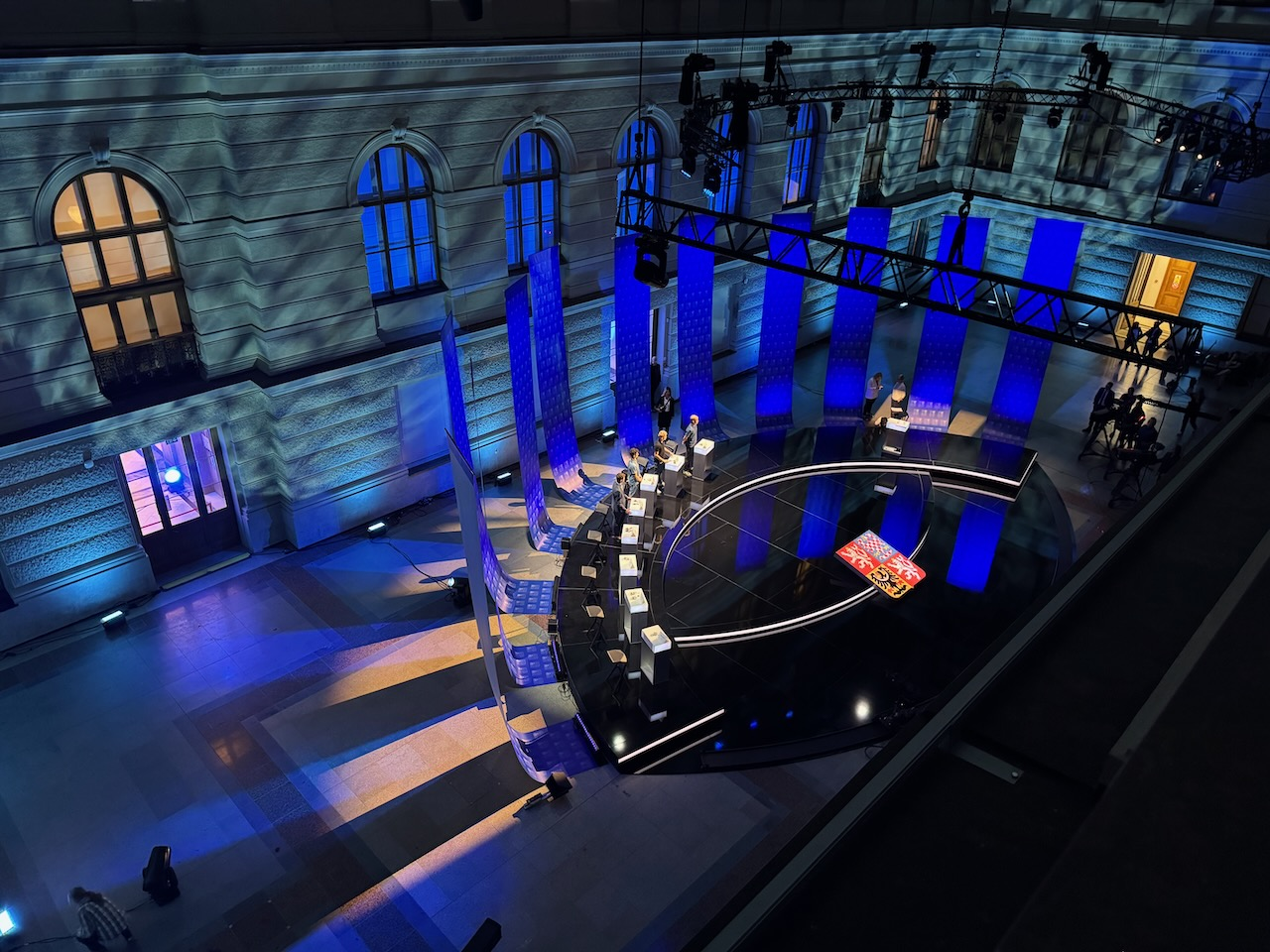
Overview of a studio of ČT24 Super-debate in the National Museum in Prague

On 8 February 2023, Babiš announced he would limit his role within ANO. He would remain as an MP and the leader of the party, while Karel Havlíček and Alena Schillerová would become the primary faces of the party, with Havlíček becoming leader of the shadow cabinet. Babiš described Havlíček as a future prime minister of the Czech Republic.

On 21 March 2025, SPD, Svobodní, Tricolour and PRO signed a memorandum agreeing to cooperate in the 2025 parliamentary election on the SPD candidate list. In July, PRO threatened to leave the joint list, citing insufficient representation of its candidates on the electoral lists, and floated the idea of joining Stačilo! instead. They later decided to remain on the SPD list. It was subsequently confirmed that each of the smaller parties had only two candidates across all the regional lists (albeit all in the top three candidates in their respective regions), with the rest of the places taken by SPD candidates. Svobodní voiced their disappointment at this arrangement, claiming that "there was not enough time to put together fairer lists", but that "the basic goals are met".

Stačilo! announced its regional leaders in March 2025 at a press conference in Ostrava. The national leader was designated as MEP and KSČM leader Kateřina Konečná, who stated that she would resign her seat in the European Parliament if elected to the Chamber of Deputies. In the Central Bohemian Region, the list was led by former MEP Jana Bobošíková, in the South Moravian Region by blogger Daniel Sterzik, in the Pardubice Region by Roman Roun, and in the Liberec Region by former Communist Party MP Stanislav Mackovík.

On 23 June, the Pirates and the Greens announced that 30 Green candidates would be included on Pirate Party candidate lists in eight regions, with the Greens' co-leader Gabriela Svárovská running in Prague. On 17 July, Stačilo! and SOCDEM reached an agreement which would see the Social Democrats endorsing the coalition's manifesto and their candidates running on the Stačilo! list. Jana Maláčová led the list in Prague, Jiří Nedvěd in the Karlovy Vary Region, and Lubomír Zaorálek took the second spot on the list in the Moravian-Silesian Region. Under the agreement, SOCDEM would be represented by two candidates on each regional list. This decision triggered a backlash from SOCDEM figures and members, with a substantial drop in membership reportedly linked to the agreement.

=== Lawsuits against non-coalitions ===
Volt argued that SPD and Stačilo!'s non-coalitions circumvented the higher threshold in place for coalitions, and prepared to file a lawsuit. They later confirmed that they would bring 28 lawsuits in total, challenging each regional list separately. Volt co-leader Adam Hanka also stated that the party was prepared to bring the case to the Czech Constitutional Court. By 27 August 3 regional courts had thrown out the case as a final ruling, saying that the 'non-coalitions' were legitimate. In response, Přísaha filed a similar lawsuit against the Pirates' candidate list in the Ústí nad Labem Region on 20 August, related to the inclusion of Green Party members.

The last lawsuit was resolved on 3 September, when the Brno Regional Court ruled that Stačilo's "circumvention of law is clearly visible and has reached heaven-appealing levels" and that "all requirements needed for a denial of registration were met". However, it chose to register the party list, saying that "courts should very seldomly influence the electoral process" and stated that lawmakers should clarify the law. Volt said they would appeal the case to the Constitutional Court, which will rule on the case after the election, during the result certification process. In the end, all lawsuits were rejected, and all originally submitted lists were approved. The unprecedentedly high number of lawsuits led to a delayed start of printing of the voting lists, which was originally scheduled to start on 22 August, but only started on 3 September, the latest feasible date.

=== Possible coalitions ===
In August, all parties of the original Fiala cabinet (SPOLU, STAN and the Pirates) declared that they were not willing to work with ANO in any future government, and also rejected cooperation with Stačilo! or SPD. Commentators said that it would be possible to re-form the SPOLU-STAN-Pirates government if the parties won enough seats to do so. They also noted that the Pirates would have a bigger influence in this scenario, as they would have won more seats by passing the electoral threshold running as a single party. By the same token, the two parliamentary opposition parties (ANO+SPD) ruled out working with any of the parties in the existing government, while ANO's leader was seen as the most likely Prime Minister after the elections.

Commentators suggested that any ANO-led government would be hard to form and maintain, as Babiš would be forced to cooperate with parties on either the far-right or the far-left. In the case of a strong result for both Stačilo! and SPD, Babiš would be forced to form a government consisting of eight parties, the most in Czech history (surpassing the record set by the outgoing government, which originally consisted of five parties). Czech Radio reported that Babiš was fearful of "lost votes", that would go to parties finishing below the electoral threshold. In 2021, there was over a million such votes, over a fifth of the total votes cast. It was reported that Babiš had pushed for electoral cooperation with Stačilo! and Social Democracy, and a recreation of the Přísaha and Motorists coalition. A one-party government was seen as the preferred option for ANO after the election, but it was considered unlikely that the party would win a majority on its own. The Motorists were perceived as the most preferred coalition partner for Babiš, although according to opinion polls it was uncertain whether they would pass the 5% threshold. It was also suggested that the most likely outcome of the election would be a single-party ANO minority government, supported by either SPD, Stačilo!, or both. Some contributors for Foreign Affairs and Seznam Zprávy also warned of the possibility of far-right parties being included in the next government.

=== President Pavel's opposition to anti-NATO/EU ministers ===
In May, President Petr Pavel said that he may refuse to appoint ministers who support the Czech Republic's withdrawal from NATO or the European Union. In June, he repeated this position, stating that if Stačilo! were in a position to set the country's foreign policy, he would consider this a "direct threat for this country", and that he would not appoint Stačilo! nominees to any ministry with responsibility for "security or foreign policy". He also confirmed that the same would apply to any SPD candidates.

=== September assault on Andrej Babiš ===
On 1 September, at a pre-election rally in the village of Dobrá, an elderly man struck Andrej Babiš on the head and the back with a crutch. The police apprehended the perpetrator at the scene, and investigated the attack as an act of hooliganism. Babiš was taken to hospital, but was discharged and stated on social media that he would likely be fine. In another statement on social media the day after the attack, Babiš said he was awaiting further medical examinations. Following the incident, Babiš cancelled the following day's election rallies. Babiš's electoral opponents condemned the attack, including SPOLU leader and PM Fiala.

=== Campaign incidents ===
In August 2025, media outlets published an audio recording from 2023 in which Margita Balaštíková, a member of parliament and candidate for ANO, expressed intent to hire someone to kill her ex-husband's new partner's dog and damage her ex-husband's business. Balaštíková was removed from the list of candidates. Pavel Jajtner, a physician from Znojmo, was a candidate ranked 13th on SPOLU's candidate list. Investigative journalists discovered that he had failed to provide adequate care for newborns during a night shift at Znojmo Hospital in January 2022. A confidentiality agreement was reached among regional representatives and family members. Marek Výborný, the leader of KDU-ČSL, for which Jajtner was running, stated that he would investigate the matter on the same day. The following day, Jajtner withdrew from the candidate list.

Nemocnice Znojmo was also the subject of another incident. ODS politician Veronika Kachlíková, with the backing of senior ODS figures (including Pavel Blažek and Karel Podzimek), acquired a former hospital dormitory in Znojmo that was sold for 38 million CZK, significantly surpassing its estimated value of 15 million CZK. Soon after the sale, local politicians changed the zoning regulations, allowing Kachlíková's company to convert the building into residential apartments, which have since been sold for around 150 million CZK. The acquisition process raised questions about political favoritism and potential conflicts of interest, especially concerning the involvement of regional ODS leaders who lobbied for the project. Kachlíková denied any wrongdoing, distancing herself from political discussions surrounding the sale and subsequent zoning changes. Karel Podzimek resigned from the candidate list for the SPOLU coalition in the South Moravian region after the allegations emerged of his involvement in the redevelopment.

=== Public concerns about electoral fraud ===
In May 2025, the media reported that the Czech public were concerned about electoral fraud on the part of Petr Fiala's cabinet, according to the STEM agency. In September 2025, another survey found that four out of ten Czechs feared election fraud. According to an analyst at NMS, the topic of stolen elections has appeared in the public sphere.

== Endorsements ==
=== ANO 2011 ===
- Democratic Party of Greens, political party
- Jan Kuželka, actor
- Viktor Orbán, Prime Minister of Hungary since 2010 and from 1998 to 2002 (specifically Andrej Babis's prime ministerial candidacy)
- Roman Skamene, actor

=== AUTO ===
- Václav Klaus, President of the Czech Republic from 2003 to 2013 and Prime Minister of the Czech Republic from 1992 to 1998
- Janusz Korwin-Mikke, former Member of the Sejm and European Parliament for Poland from New Hope
- Dominika Myslivcová, blogger and youtuber (specifically Filip Turek)

=== Pirates ===
- Dominik Hašek, former ice hockey player (co-endorsed STAN)
- Jaroslav Hutka, musician
- Idealists.cz, social-democratic organisation
- Idealist Movement, political party
- Prague Together, political party (co-endorsed SPOLU and STAN)

=== SPD ===
- Bezpečné ulice, political party
- Milan Mazurek, Member of the European Parliament for Slovakia from Republic Movement party (specifically Libor Vondráček)

=== SPOLU ===
- Martin Dejdar, actor (specifically Martin Kupka)
- Eduard Heger, Prime Minister of Slovakia from 2021 to 2023 and Finance Minister of Slovakia from 2020 to 2021 (specifically Petr Fiala's prime ministerial candidacy)
- Petr Novotný, comedian and host (specifically ODS)
- Prague Together, political party (co-endorsed Pirates and STAN)
- Václav Vydra, actor (specifically Martin Kupka)
- Manfred Weber, Member of the European Parliament for Germany and president of the European People's Party (specifically TOP 09 and KDU-ČSL)

=== Stačilo! ===
- Ľuboš Blaha, Member of the European Parliament for Slovakia from SMER-SD
- Michal Hašek, Governor of the South Moravian Region from 2008 to 2016
- Jaroslava Obermaierová, actress
- Branislav Ondruš, Member of the European Parliament for Slovakia from HLAS-SD and former news presenter
- Matěj Stropnický, former leader of the Green party
- Miloš Zeman, President of the Czech Republic from 2013 to 2023 and Prime Minister of the Czech Republic from 1998 to 2002 (previously endorsed ANO 2011)

=== STAN ===
- Dominik Hašek, former ice hockey player (co-endorsed Pirates)
- Eva Holubová, actress
- Jan Hřebejk, film director
- Prague Together, political party (co-endorsed Pirates and SPOLU)

== Parties ==
28 lists were submitted to take part in the elections before the 29 July deadline, of which one was a coalition list (SPOLU) and 27 were party lists (including unofficial joint electoral lists). The respective regional courts had time to register or reject these lists until 15 August. 25 party lists and one coalition list were registered at the end of this process, as the Democratic Party of Greens and 'Yes, Better Czechia with Aliens' both withdrew their candidate lists.

Deník N noted that the number of candidates was the lowest since 1998, due to the numerous electoral alliances. The share of women on the lists was 31.3%, a slight drop from 2021. Pirates had the largest number of female candidates, while Motorists for Themselves had the least. The average age of candidates was 49.2 years, the highest in the history of the Czech Republic. The youth-oriented Generation Movement had the youngest list, while the Right Bloc's candidates had the highest average age.

=== Parliamentary parties ===
Name			Ideology	Political position	Leader	2021 result		Seats at dissolution
Name			Ideology	Political position	Leader	%	Seats	Seats at dissolution
ANO	ANO 2011		Right-wing populism	Right-wing	Andrej Babiš	27.1%	72 / 200	71 / 200
SPOLU	ODS	Civic Democratic Party; Občanská demokratická strana	Conservatism	Centre-right	Petr Fiala	27.8%	34 / 200	35 / 200
SPOLU	KDU-ČSL	KDU-ČSL	Christian democracy	Centre to centre-right	Marian Jurečka	27.8%	23 / 200	22 / 200
SPOLU	TOP 09	TOP 09	Liberal conservatism	Centre-right	Markéta Pekarová Adamová (Note: Not running for reelection)	27.8%	14 / 200	14 / 200
SPD	Freedom and Direct Democracy (Note: SPD list with Tricolour, Svobodní and PRO members); Svoboda a přímá demokracie		Nationalism; Right-wing populism	Far-right	Tomio Okamura	9.6%	20 / 200	19 / 200
STAN	Mayors and Independents (Note: STAN list with members of SLK, Karlovy Vary Civic Initiative and Eastern Bohemians); Starostové a nezávislí		Liberalism	Centre to centre-right	Vít Rakušan	15.6%	33 / 200	33 / 200
Pirates	Czech Pirate Party (Note: Pirates list with Green Party members); Česká pirátská strana		Pirate politics Liberalism	Centre to centre-left	Zdeněk Hřib	15.6%	4 / 200	4 / 200
Ind	Independents		Ivo Vondrák, (Note: Left ANO after 2023 Czech presidential election) Jiří Kobza (Note: Left Freedom and Direct Democracy) (Note: Kobza is contesting the election on Stačilo!'s list in the Central Bohemian Region)					2 / 200

=== Extra-parliamentary parties ===
Name		Ideology	Political position	Leader	2021 result
AUTO	Motorists for Themselves (Note: Supported by the Freeholder Party of the Czech Republic); Motoristé sobě	Right-wing populism National conservatism	Right-wing to far-right	Filip Turek	new party
Přísaha	Přísaha Civic Movement (Note: Přísaha list with members of Hlas samospráv, PES Movement, Change 2020 and Independents); Přísaha občanské hnutí	Right-wing populism	Right-wing	Robert Šlachta	4.7%
Stačilo!	Stačilo! (Note: List with members of Stačilo!, Communist Party of Bohemia and Moravia, Social Democracy, Czech National Social Party, United Democrats – Association of Independents and Moravané) (Note: While Jiří Kobza is running for reelection on the Stačilo! list, he is not a member of any of the coalition parties and currently sits as an independent in the Chamber.)	Left-wing populism Left-wing nationalism	Left-wing to far-left	Kateřina Konečná	8.3% (Note: Joint result of Communist Party of Bohemia and Moravia and Social Democracy)
ČSSD	Czech Sovereignty of Social Democracy (Note: ČSSD list with members of Home, Direction Czech Republic and Czechoslovak Communist Party (1995)); Česká suverenita sociální demokracie	Left-wing nationalism	Left-wing	Jiří Paroubek	1.3%
SD	Swiss Democracy (Note: Swiss Democracy list with members of SOS Praha and SSPD–SP); Švýcarská demokracie	Direct democracy Social conservatism	Right-wing	Tomáš Raždík	0.3%
KČ	Czech Crown (Note: KČ list with members of the Conservative Party); Koruna Česká	Monarchism	Centre-right to right-wing	Václav Srb	0.1%
Urza	Urza.cz	Anarcho-capitalism	N/A	Martin Urza	0.1%
MZH	Moravian Land Movement; Moravské zemské hnutí	Regionalism	Centre to centre-left	Pavel Trčala	0.1%
Left	The Left (Note: Left list with members of Budoucnost); Levice	Democratic socialism	Left-wing	Markéta Juřicová	0.1%
PB	Right Bloc; Pravý blok	Anti-communism; Social conservatism	Right-wing	Petr Cibulka	0.1%
BPS	Balbín's Poetic Party; Balbínova poetická strana	Direct democracy Anti-communism	N/A	Jiří Hrdina	did not run
ČR1	Czech Republic in First Place! (Note: ČR1 list with members of SPR-RSČ and National Democracy); Česká republika na 1. místě!	Vaccine hesitancy	Far-right	Ladislav Vrabel	new party
Kruh	Circle Movement; Hnutí Kruh	Progressivism; Feminism	Centre-left to left-wing	Collective leadership	new party
Generation	Generation Movement; Hnutí Generace	Economic liberalism	Centre-right	Daniel Krutý (Note: Not running in the election)	new party
HOP	Movement of Citizens and Entrepreneurs; Hnutí občanů a podnikatelů	Anti-establishment; Populism	N/A	Libor Maleček	new party
JaSaN	Clear Signal of Independents (Note: Supported by Seniors for Themselves); Jasný Signál Nezávislých	Sovereigntism; Populism	Right-wing to far-right	Vladimír Štěpán	new party
Rebels	Rebels; Rebelové	Economic populism	Centre	Miloslav Zientek	new party
SMS	The State Should Serve (Note: Supported by REFERENDUM – Voice of the People); Stát Má Sloužit	Liberal conservatism	Centre	Karel Leškovský	new party
Volt	Volt Czechia (Note: Volt list with members of the Liberal Alliance of Independent Citizens); Volt Česko	European federalism Social liberalism	Centre to centre-left	Mikuláš Peksa	new party
Voluntia	Voluntia	Libertarianism; Voluntaryism	Right-wing	Tomáš Roud	new party
CHALLENGE	Challenge 2025; Výzva 2025	Social market economy Conservatism	Centre-right	Karolína Kubisková	new party

== Opinion polls ==
Local regression graph of polls conducted since the 2021 election by party

== Results ==
Party	Votes	%	Seats	+/–
ANO 2011	1,940,507	34.52	80	+8
SPOLU	1,313,346	23.36	52	–19
Mayors and Independents	631,512	11.23	22	–11
Czech Pirate Party	504,537	8.97	18	+14
Freedom and Direct Democracy	437,611	7.78	15	–5
Motorists for Themselves	380,601	6.77	13	New
Stačilo!	242,031	4.31	0	0
Přísaha Civic Movement	60,503	1.08	0	0
Generation Movement	25,176	0.45	0	New
Czech Republic in First Place!	12,455	0.22	0	New
Swiss Democracy	12,097	0.22	0	0
Czech Sovereignty of Social Democracy	10,263	0.18	0	0
Voluntia	7,375	0.13	0	New
Koruna Česká	7,313	0.13	0	0
Challenge 2025	6,338	0.11	0	New
Clear Signal of Independents	4,937	0.09	0	New
Rebels	4,185	0.07	0	New
Moravian Land Movement	3,842	0.07	0	0
Movement of Citizens and Entrepreneurs	3,718	0.07	0	New
Volt Czechia	3,639	0.06	0	New
The Left	3,318	0.06	0	0
The State Should Serve	2,881	0.05	0	New
Circle Movement	2,209	0.04	0	New
Balbín's Poetic Party	612	0.01	0	New
Right Bloc	429	0.01	0	0
Urza.cz	282	0.01	0	0
Total	5,621,717	100.00	200	0
Valid votes	5,621,717	98.79		
Invalid/blank votes	68,918	1.21		
Total votes	5,690,635	100.00		
Registered voters/turnout	8,253,316	68.95		
Source: Volby

Popular vote
ANO 2011	34.52%
SPOLU	23.36%
STAN	11.23%
Pirates	8.97%
SPD	7.78%
AUTO	6.77%
Stačilo!	4.31%
Přísaha	1.08%
Others	1.98%

Parliamentary seats
ANO 2011	40.00%
SPOLU	26.00%
STAN	11.00%
Pirates	9.00%
SPD	7.50%
AUTO	6.50%

=== Results by region ===
Region	ANO 2011	Spolu	STAN	Pirates	SPD	AUTO	Stačilo!	Others	Turnout
Prague	19.83	33.97	13.40	16.89	5.23	5.15	2.75	2.66	71.44
Central Bohemia	31.12	24.32	13.72	9.09	7.06	7.76	3.63	3.19	71.28
South Bohemia	34.87	23.61	10.76	7.59	7.93	7.04	4.79	3.28	69.49
Plzeň	37.31	20.99	10.62	7.78	8.88	7.16	4.26	2.90	68.26
Karlovy Vary	42.49	15.40	10.94	6.49	10.21	7.28	4.09	2.98	60.74
Ústí nad Labem	44.85	15.40	9.61	6.96	9.13	6.79	4.32	2.87	61.96
Liberec	34.40	18.06	16.34	8.20	8.65	7.35	4.18	2.74	68.05
Hradec Králové	33.63	23.60	12.21	8.05	7.75	7.61	4.21	2.85	70.56
Pardubice	34.61	23.62	11.05	7.71	7.68	7.76	4.51	2.98	71.41
Vysočina	36.11	23.28	11.80	7.07	7.32	6.80	4.70	2.83	72.53
South Moravia	32.29	27.24	9.63	9.45	7.54	6.13	4.42	3.21	70.07
Olomouc	38.72	20.14	9.36	7.33	9.43	6.64	5.16	3.12	68.61
Zlín	34.87	24.24	10.20	7.54	8.74	6.71	4.65	2.94	69.76
Moravia-Silesia	43.42	17.98	8.37	7.18	8.09	6.42	5.52	2.91	66.31
Abroad	3.95	39.26	21.48	28.24	2.04	2.32	1.04	1.56	79.38
Czech Republic	34.52	23.36	11.23	8.97	7.78	6.77	4.31	3.06	68.95
Source: Volby

=== Results by district ===
ANO 2011

SPOLU

STAN

Pirates

SPD

AUTO

Stačilo!

=== Seat distribution ===
Results by MP membership and nomination
Party (nomination)	Party (membership)	Seats	+/–
ANO 2011	ANO 2011	76	+13
ANO 2011	Independents	4	-5
ANO 2011	Total	80	+8
Civic Democratic Party	Civic Democratic Party	26	−7
Civic Democratic Party	Independent	1	+1
Civic Democratic Party	Total	27	−6
Mayors and Independents	Mayors and Independents	20	−11
Mayors and Independents	Mayors for the Liberec Region	2	+1
Mayors and Independents	Total	22	−11
Czech Pirate Party	Czech Pirate Party	16	+12
Czech Pirate Party	Green Party	2	+2
Czech Pirate Party	Total	18	+14
KDU-ČSL		16	−3
Freedom and Direct Democracy	Freedom and Direct Democracy	10	−10
Freedom and Direct Democracy	Svobodní	2	+2
Freedom and Direct Democracy	Tricolour	1	+1
Freedom and Direct Democracy	Law, Respect, Expertise	1	+1
Freedom and Direct Democracy	Independent	1	+1
Freedom and Direct Democracy	Total	15	−5
Motorists for Themselves	Motorists for Themselves	6	New
Motorists for Themselves	Independents	7	New
Motorists for Themselves	Total	13	New
TOP 09		9	−5

== Aftermath ==
After the results were released, incumbent Prime Minister Petr Fiala conceded the election and congratulated Andrej Babiš on ANO 2011's election victory, acknowledging that it was not possible to form a government of Spolu, STAN, and the Pirates. ANO leader Andrej Babiš declared victory and repeated that he would not enter a coalition with the current government parties (SPOLU and STAN) or with the Pirates, while those three parties also ruled out coalitions with ANO. He stated his intention to try to form a minority government, with ANO ruling alone, and said he would seek to negotiate with Freedom and Direct Democracy (SPD) and the Motorists to agree to a confidence and supply deal for his government. On 6 October 2025, Máláčová announced that the SOCDEM leadership would resign at an extraordinary congress.

On 7 October 2025, Fiala accepted responsibility for the electoral result and announced that he would not seek reelection as leader of ODS. He said he would not be leaving politics altogether, and would serve his term as a backbench MP. First deputy leader of ODS Zbyněk Stanjura also stated he would not run for reelection in the future, after losing his mandate due to preferential votes.

=== Government formation ===
On 5 October, the day after the election, Babiš said ANO would lead talks with SPD and AUTO to seek a single-party government. All other parties (SPOLU, STAN, and Pirates) had ruled out working with ANO. President Petr Pavel held meetings with the leaders of all parties that made it into parliament in the days following the election. On 6 October, Pavel said it was "clear" that there was interest in forming a coalition government composed of ANO, SPD, and AUTO. ANO's initial goal to form a single-party minority cabinet had become "difficult to attain", as SPD and AUTO both said they wanted to participate directly in the government. It was reported that both smaller parties wanted at least two ministries each; SPD were interested in the education, defence, foreign affairs, industry, and interior ministries, and proposed nominating non-party experts to lead them in order to avoid internal party frictions. AUTO said they wished to nominate leader Petr Macinka as environment minister, Filip Turek as foreign affairs minister, and Oto Klempíř as culture minister. It was also reported that SPD wanted to nominate their leader Tomio Okamura for the post of President of the Chamber of Deputies, which was not ruled out by either Babiš or Okamura.

Over 470 artists, academics and representatives of the cultural community signed an open letter to Andrej Babiš and President Petr Pavel opposing an AUTO nominee for the post of Minister of Culture. The association of Czech non-profit environmental organizations Zelený kruh, expressed opposition to an AUTO nominee for the post of Environment Minister. On 19 October 2025, thousands of people attended a demonstration against Macinka's nomination on Prague's Hradčany Square, organized by non-profit environmental organizations Greenpeace, Re-set and Fridays for Future.

On 27 October 2025, Pavel asked Babiš to form a government. The leaders of ANO, SPD and AUTO signed the coalition agreement on 3 November. The new Chamber of Deputies had its constituent meeting the same day. ANO MPs Richard Brabec, Petr Kubis and Roman Zarzycký resigned in order to focus on regional politics. They were replaced by Jana Demjanová, Jiří Penc and Vlastimil Hebr.

Babiš met Pavel on 26 November to present his cabinet and proposed government ministers. Pavel stated that he would appoint Babiš as the new prime minister within a week after he publicly addressed his business interests, and expressed his ongoing disagreement with potential minister Filip Turek, the candidate for Minister of Environment. AUTO leader Macinka stated that he saw no legal reasons why Turek could not be appointed minister.

=== Proposed cabinet ===
The ministerial candidates for the government are:

- Non-party ministers are grouped with the nominating party in italics.

Party	Ministers (16 total)
ANO	9 / 16 List of ministers: Andrej Babiš – Prime Minister; Karel Havlíček – Minister of Industry and Trade; Alena Schillerová – Minister of Finance; Aleš Juchelka – Minister of Labour and Social Affairs; Adam Vojtěch – Minister of Health; Lubomír Metnar – Minister of the Interior; Robert Plaga – Minister of Education; Jeroným Tejc – Minister of Justice; Zuzana Schwarz Bařtipánová – Minister of Regional Development
AUTO	4 / 16 List of ministers: Petr Macinka – Minister of Foreign Affairs; Filip Turek – Minister of the Environment; Oto Klempíř – Minister of Culture; Boris Šťastný – Minister of Sports, Prevention and Health
SPD	3 / 16 List of ministers: Ivan Bednárik – Minister of Transport; Jaromír Zůna – Minister of Defence; Martin Šebestyán – Minister of Agriculture

=== Subsequent political developments ===
Pavel started meeting the ministerial nominees on 28 November 2025, when he met Robert Plaga, Adam Vojtěch and Jeroným Tejc. On 1 December 2025, he met Karel Havlíček, Alena Schillerová and Aleš Juchelka. A day later, Pavel met Lubomír Metnar, Zuzana Schwarz Bařtipánová and Ivan Bednárik. On 4 December 2025, Pavel met Jaromír Zůna, Martin Šebestyán and Petr Macinka. The meetings concluded on 8 December when Pavel met Oto Klempíř and Boris Šťastný. Environment minister candidate Filip Turek cancelled a planned meeting with Pavel that day, after he was hospitalized with a herniated disc.

Babiš announced on Facebook on 5 December that he would shift his holding company Agrofert to an independently governed trust structure, and in response Pavel agreed to appoint him as Prime Minister, which he did on 9 December at Prague Castle. Babiš submitted an updated proposed cabinet to Pavel, from which Filip Turek was omitted, citing health reasons. Macinka will become the interim head of the environment ministry. Hundreds of students in Prague and several other Czech cities attended a demonstration against the prospect of an AUTO nominee leading the Ministry of Environment.

Babiš' cabinet was appointed by Pavel on 15 December 2025, with a vote of confidence scheduled in the Chamber of Deputies for 13 January 2026. In the morning of 15 December, several Greenpeace members displayed a large banner on the Ministry of the Environment building in protest against the AUTO representatives leading the ministry. Several hundred students attended a demonstration on Prague's Hradčany Square, Brno's Malinovsky Square and Ostrava's Prokeš Square for the same reasons, organized by Fridays for Future.

On 17 December 2025, Turek asked Pavel for a new meeting date, and the two men finally met on 22 December 2025. Turek tried to explain his affairs to Pavel, but was unable to convince Pavel to withdraw his objections to Turek's appointment. Pavel said he expected PM Babiš not to propose Turek for the post, and said he may reject Turek's nomination if it is proposed. Macinka stated that the Motorists' position on Turek's nomination remained the same, and they will ask Babiš to propose Turek as environment minister.

On 7 January 2026, Pavel hosted Babiš at a traditional New Year's lunch at Prague Castle. Babiš again submitted the nomination of Turek for environment minister, but Pavel refused to appoint him. The Motorists insisted on Turek's nomination and criticised what it described as "the president's approach to his constitutional duties." In a letter to Babiš, Pavel said he must protect fundamental constitutional values, including the rejection of totalitarian ideologies, arguing that Turek's past statements and conduct cast doubt on his loyalty to those values, such as remarks that praised or downplayed Nazi Germany, and that Turek had repeatedly shown a lack of respect for the Czech legal order. Turek said Pavel's reasoning had deeply offended him and he would file a lawsuit for protection of personality right. On 12 January 2026, Turek was appointed government commissioner for climate policy as a temporary measure, though the opposition argued that this was unconstitutional.

Babiš' cabinet was presented to the Chamber of Deputies on 13 January 2026 for a confidence vote. The vote did not occur on that day as 60 speakers were waiting in the pre-vote debate. The confidence debate session continued in the morning of 14 January 2026. On 15 January 2026, after 26 hours of debate, the cabinet won the confidence vote by 108–91, with 199 MPs present.

On 16 January 2026, MPs from the governing coalition urged Pavel to appoint ministers proposed by the prime minister, in reference to Turek. Pavel acknowledged the resolution. Babiš stated that he would not submit the nomination of Turek for environment minister again, because Pavel would not appoint him anyway.

On 27 January 2026, Pavel announced at a press conference that Foreign Minister Petr Macinka had sent two text messages to Pavel's adviser Petr Kolář, demanding that Pavel appoint Turek as the Minister of Environment, or else he would "burn bridges in a way that will go down in political science textbooks..." and "the consequences will come as a great surprise." Pavel denounced the messages as blackmail, shared them on social media, and submitted a report to the security services. Macinka said he did not consider his text messages to be blackmail. PM Babiš said that Macinka's words addressed to Pavel's adviser were "unfortunate" but argued that as a private communication with an adviser, they "certainly cannot be considered blackmail." Several lawyers approached by journalists described the text messages as "disgusting" and "arrogant", but said they did not consider them to be blackmail. Opposition leaders called for Macinka to resign or be dismissed by Babiš. On 4 February 2026, the coalition government survived a motion of no confidence in the Chamber of Deputies, filed by opposition parties over the Pavel-Macinka dispute. The cabinet won the no-confidence vote by 99–84, with 183 MPs present.

The Presidential Office announced that Pavel was ready to appoint an environment minister, and was expecting Babiš to propose a new candidate. Rejected candidate Turek told reporters that the Motorists would not propose another candidate for the ministry, but the party subsequently nominated MP Igor Červený, who was appointed by Pavel on 23 February 2026.

On 30 April 2026, the Czech police concluded their investigation of Macinka's text messages. The Presidential Office announced that they would not file a complaint against the concluded investigation.
