= Opinion polling for the 2025 Czech parliamentary election =

Opinion polling for the 2025 Czech parliamentary election was conducted prior to and in the run-up to the election in October 2025. Polls were conducted up to 29 September 2025, after which election silence applies.

== Polling industry ==
Political polling in Czechia has, compared to the European mean, a medium to high level of polling error. Pollsters with low Absolute Total Raw Error in the past elections include Phoenix, STEM, and SANEP. Higher Absolute Total Raw Error occurred for Ipsos, Kantar, and Median.

The pollster Phoenix has reportedly links to has people close to the party Trikolora and/or former president Václav Klaus. SANEP's Jan Fulín (managing director) received major financial contributions from chairman of the party SPD, Tomio Okamura. Sanep's polls before the election showed SPD consistently stronger than other pollsters.

== Polling aggregations ==
The following table displays the most recent aggregations of polling results from different organisations

=== Vote share ===
Organisation	Last update	SPOLU			ANO	STAN	Piráti		SPD				Přísaha	Motorists for Themselves	Stačilo!		Lead
Organisation	Last update	ODS	KDU–ČSL	TOP 09	ANO	STAN	Piráti	Z	SPD	Tricolour	Svobodní	PRO	Přísaha	Motorists for Themselves	SOCDEM	/	Lead
Mandáty.cz	29 Sep 2025	20			31	11	9		13				3	5	7		11
Politico	29 Sep 2025	19			30	12	10		13				2	7	7		11
Programy do voleb	29 Sep 2025	20.1			30.6	11.4	9.3		12.4				2.4	5.8	6.8		10.5

=== Seat projections ===
Organisation	Last update	SPOLU			ANO	STAN	Piráti		SPD				Přísaha	Motorists for Themselves	Stačilo!		Lead
Organisation	Last update	ODS	KDU–ČSL	TOP 09	ANO	STAN	Piráti	Z	SPD	Tricolour	Svobodní	PRO	Přísaha	Motorists for Themselves	SOCDEM	/	Lead
Programy do voleb	26 Sep 2025	43			69	23	19		26				0	9	11		26
Mandáty.cz	30 Sep 2025	42			67	24	20		27				0	8	12		25

== Party and election coalition polling ==
The polls in this section are done by individual party, or by the coalitions the parties are a part of for the election.

=== Graphical summary ===
Local regression graph of polls conducted since the 2021 election by party

=== Polls ===
The party in first has its cell shaded in the party's colour. Polling figures which are in bold indicate the relevant party is above the threshold to gain representation. Single party lists need to pass a 5% threshold, two-party coalitions need to pass an 8% threshold and three or more-party coalitions need to pass an 11% threshold.

From January 2025 until the election, STEM began to post weekly polls for CNN Prima News, which were a rolling sample including over 500 respondents each week, which incorporated the last 3 waves of respondents.

Polling firm	Fieldwork date	Sample size	SPOLU			ANO	STAN	Piráti		SPD				Přísaha	Motorists for Themselves	Stačilo!		Others	Lead
Polling firm	Fieldwork date	Sample size	ODS	KDU–ČSL	TOP 09	ANO	STAN	Piráti	Z	SPD	Tricolour	Svobodní	PRO	Přísaha	Motorists for Themselves	SOCDEM	/	Others	Lead
2025 legislative election	3–4 Oct 2025	N/A	23.4			34.5	11.2	9.0		7.8				1.1	6.8	4.3		1.9	11.1
	30 Sep–4 Oct 2025	Election silence applies and polls cannot be published.																	
NMS	24–28 Sep 2025	1,497	17.8			29.5	**11.8**	**9.6**		13.1				1.6	**7.7**	**7.3**		1.6	11.7
Ipsos	22–28 Sep 2025	1,467	21.1			32.6	**11.2**	**8.7**		10.1				2.1	**5.4**	**7.7**		1.1	11.5
STEM	20–26 Sep 2025	1,434	20.5			29.3	**11.7**	**10.1**		13.4				3.2	**5.9**	**5.5**		0.4	8.8
Median	1–25 Sep 2025	1,019	21.0			30.5	**10.0**	**10.0**		13.0				2.0	4.5	**7.0**		2.0	9.5
STEM	18–24 Sep 2025	1,200	21.0			28.0	**12.2**	**9.8**		13.8				3.4	**5.6**	**5.5**		0.7	7
STEM/MARK (Note: The STEM/MARK agency objected to the publication of this electoral model, claiming that the poll was primarily to be used to tes the D21 electoral system.)	16–22 Sep 2025	1,407	18.0			27.5	**11.6**	**11.7**		12.3				2.2	**7.6**	**7.9**		1.3	9.5
Lord Ashcroft Polls	8–22 Sep 2025	1,429	18.5			34.6	**8.6**	**9.9**		11.1				2.5	3.7	**7.4**		2.5	16.1
Kantar CZ	1–19 Sep 2025	1,042	19.5			33.0	**13.0**	**9.5**		9.5				2.0	**6.0**	**6.0**		1.5	13.5
STEM	28 Aug–16 Sep 2025	1,500	19.5			30.9	**12.2**	**9.3**		12.0				2.0	**5.7**	**7.7**		0.7	11.4
Sanep	3–12 Sep 2025	2,500	16.1			33.5	**10.9**	**7.2**		13.7				2.2	**6.5**	**8.1**		1.8	17.4
STEM	21 Aug–9 Sep 2025	1,547	20.2			31.3	**10.0**	**10.0**		12.5				2.2	**6.0**	**7.4**		0.5	11.1
NMS	1–7 Sep 2025	1,002	19.9			31.0	**12.6**	**9.0**		12.4				2.7	**5.4**	**5.5**		1.5	11.1
STEM	14 Aug–Sep 2025	1,550	20.3			30.7	**10.5**	**9.2**		12.9				2.9	**5.5**	**7.4**		0.7	10.4
Ipsos	27–31 Aug 2025	1,095	21.5			32.2	**10.9**	**7.6**		11.5				2.2	**5.6**	**7.1**		1.4	10.7
Median	1–31 Aug 2025	1,020	19.5			30.5	**11.0**	**6.5**		14.0				1.5	**5.0**	**9.0**		3.0	11.0
STEM	7–26 Aug 2025	1,543	20.9			31.2	**10.1**	**8.9**		12.8				3.4	**5.1**	**6.5**		1.1	10.3
Kantar CZ	4–22 Aug 2025	1,029	20.0			33.0	**12.0**	**9.5**		10.5				2.0	**5.5**	**6.0**		1.5	11.0
STEM	31 Jul–19 Aug 2025	1,500	21.3			32.7	**10.9**	**8.5**		11.0				3.3	3.9	**7.0**		1.4	12.4
Sanep	7–15 Aug 2025	2,400	15.9			33.1	**10.1**	**8.7**		14.8				2.1	4.9	**8.5**		1.9	17.2
STEM	24 Jul–12 Aug 2025	1,546	20.1			32.5	**10.8**	**9.2**		12.1				2.4	4.7	**7.1**		1.1	12.4
NMS	1–5 Aug 2025	1,014	18.7			29.8	**10.7**	**8.8**		14.6				2.6	**5.7**	**8.2**		0.9	11.1
STEM	17 Jul–5 Aug 2025	1,551	21.3			31.1	**10.5**	**8.1**		13.2				2.2	4.9	**8.0**		0.6	9.8
Ipsos	28 Jul–2 Aug 2025	1,021	21.9			34.9	**10.0**	**8.6**		11.4				2.0	3.9	**6.3**		1.1	13.0
Median	1–31 Jul 2025	1,015	19.5			33.0	**11.0**	**7.5**		14.0				1.5	4.5	3.0	**5.0**	1.0	13.5
STEM	10–29 Jul 2025	1,558	20.8			31.5	**10.3**	**8.3**		13.8				2.8	4.2	**7.5**		0.8	10.7
STEM	1–22 Jul 2025	1,559	21.2			32.9	**12.0**	**7.6**		12.5				1.9	4.1	**7.2**		0.6	11.7
	17 Jul 2025	Stačilo! approved an agreement in which SOCDEM candidates run on their electoral list.																	
STEM	24 Jun–15 Jul 2025	1,553	19.4			31.5	**12.2**	**8.1**		12.8				2.0	3.5	2.7	**7.4**	0.4	12.1
Sanep	1–10 Jul 2025	2,650	16.6			33.4	**12.6**	**7.2**		13.7				2.1	4.3	3.0	**6.5**	1.1	16.8
STEM	19 Jun–8 Jul 2025	1,553	19.9			30.9	**13.2**	**8.0**		12.4				2.2	3.5	3.2	**6.3**	0.4	11.0
NMS	2–7 Jul 2025	1,002	21.5			28.7	**12.0**	**7.9**		13.3				3.2	3.2	2.2	**5.8**	1.3	7.2
STEM	12 Jun–1 Jul 2025	1,559	20.5			30.9	**12.3**	**7.9**		13.9				2.7	4.0	2.4	**5.0**	0.9	10.4
Median	1–30 Jun 2025	1,022	19.0			32.0	**9.0**	**8.0**	–	14.0				2.5	**5.5**	1.5	**5.5**	2.5	13.0
Ipsos	24–29 Jun 2025	1,035	21.4			35.1	**10.8**	**6.7**		10.5				2.4	4.5	2.3	**5.7**	0.6	13.5
STEM	5–24 Jun 2025	1,555	20.8			31.9	**10.6**	**7.8**		13.0				2.9	4.8	2.9	4.6	0.7	11.1
	23 Jun 2025	Zelení announced that its nominees will join the Pirates' list in 8 regions, not contesting the remaining 6.																	
Kantar CZ	9–20 Jun 2025	1,016	21.0			33.5	**11.5**	**7.5**	2.0	11.5				–	4.5	–	4.5	4.0	12.5
STEM	30 May–17 Jun 2025	2,074	20.4			31.2	**9.4**	**7.2**	2.2	13.3				3.0	4.4	2.7	**5.4**	0.8	10.8
STEM	30 May–10 Jun 2025	1,551	21.6			31.2	**10.6**	**6.7**	1.8	13.1				1.8	4.4	3.0	**5.0**	0.7	9.6
Sanep	1–7 Jun 2025	2,730	15.8			33.1	**12.2**	**5.9**		14.5				2.0	4.9	3.2	**6.6**	1.8	17.3
STEM	23 May–4 Jun 2025 (Note: Using two waves of polling rather than three, in order to try and measure the impact of the Bitcoin scandal.)	1,552	22.3			30.1	**10.8**	**6.2**	1.6	13.1				1.9	4.0	3.6	**5.5**	0.9	7.8
NMS	30 May–3 Jun 2025	1,009	19.7			30.5	**11.9**	**6.2**	1.6	16.7				1.3	3.6	2.0	**5.2**	1.3	10.8
Ipsos	26 May–1 Jun 2025	1,006	20.6			34.1	**9.9**	**6.0**	2.7	10.1				2.1	4.6	2.7	**6.4**	0.8	13.5
Median	1–31 May 2025	1,012	21.0			32.0	**10.5**	**5.5**	–	13.5				–	3.0	2.0	**6.5**	3.5	11.0
	30 May 2025	Minister of Justice Pavel Blažek resigns over a money laundering scandal.																	
Kantar CZ	12–30 May 2025	1,200	21.0			34.5	**12.0**	**6.5**	–	10.5				–	**5.0**	2.0	4.5	4.0	13.5
STEM	9–27 May 2025	1,552	21.8			31.6	**11.4**	**6.1**	1.4	12.8				2.1	3.6	3.1	**5.4**	0.7	9.8
STEM	30 Apr–20 May 2025	1,551	20.7			32.3	**11.2**	**7.3**	2.1	12.6				1.7	2.8	2.2	**6.7**	0.4	11.6
STEM	25 Apr–13 May 2025	1,548	20.9			32.4	**10.0**	**6.7**	2.2	12.7				1.9	3.6	2.4	**6.6**	0.6	11.5
NMS	6–12 May 2025	1,004	21.7			30.3	**9.9**	**6.1**	1.8	13.7				2.7	4.9	2.8	4.6	1.5	8.6
Sanep	1–9 May 2025	2,650	18.7			31.9	**10.2**	**7.0**		12.8				2.6	4.9	3.8	**6.5**	1.6	13.2
STEM	18 Apr–6 May 2025	1,568	20.2			30.7	**10.0**	**6.6**	2.5	12.6				2.0	4.5	3.5	**6.5**	0.9	10.5
Ipsos	28 Apr–4 May 2025	1,045	21.7			34.4	**9.8**	**6.1**	2.1	10.4				2.4	4.5	1.8	**5.8**	1.1	12.7
Kantar CZ	14 Apr–2 May 2025	1,025	19.5			35.0	**12.5**	**6.5**	2.0	10.0				–	**6.0**	2.0	4.5	2.0	15.5
Median	1–30 Apr 2025	1,021	20.5			33.0	**10.0**	**5.5**	–	11.0				–	**7.0**	4.5	**5.0**	3.5	12.5
STEM	11–29 Apr 2025	1,582	19.8			31.5	**9.7**	**6.3**	2.0	12.6				2.5	4.8	3.3	**6.3**	1.2	11.7
STEM	1–22 Apr 2025	1,596	19.5			32.2	**10.1**	**5.9**	2.4	11.6				2.6	**5.4**	3.8	**5.8**	0.8	12.7
STEM	24 Mar–15 Apr 2025	2,103	19.8			33.0	**10.8**	**6.5**	2.0	11.1				2.5	**5.0**	3.4	**5.2**	0.7	13.2
NMS	2–9 Apr 2025	1,000	20.9			28.1	**12.2**	**5.9**	2.0	12.5				2.8	**6.0**	2.5	**5.2**	1.9	7.2
Sanep	1–8 Apr 2025	2,500	19.2			33.4	**11.3**	**5.0**	1.7	10.4				2.0	**6.2**	3.0	**5.9**	1.9	14.2
STEM	21 Mar–8 Apr 2025	2,096	19.9			31.6	**11.9**	**6.4**	2.0	10.5				2.4	**6.0**	3.0	**5.4**	0.9	11.7
Kantar CZ	17 Mar–4 Apr 2025	1,035	19.0			35.5	**12.0**	**6.0**	2.0	7.0	–	–	–	2.0	**6.5**	2.0	4.5	3.5	16.5
STEM	14 Mar–1 Apr 2025	1,567	19.9			31.4	**11.3**	**6.8**	2.2	10.7				1.8	**6.2**	3.6	**5.7**	0.4	11.5
Median	1–31 Mar 2025	1,025	18.5			32.5	**13.0**	**8.0**	–	7.5	–	–	–	–	**6.0**	2.5	**5.5**	6.5	14.0
Ipsos	24–28 Mar 2025	1,059	20.9			35.8	**10.3**	**5.8**	1.0	9.8				1.4	**5.0**	3.5	**5.1**	1.4	14.9
STEM	7–25 Mar 2025	1,550	20.0			31.1	**11.8**	**5.8**	1.8	8.9	–	1.6	–	1.9	**6.7**	2.6	**6.3**	1.5	11.1
	21 Mar 2025	The leaders of Tricolour, SVO and PRO agree to stand candidates on the SPD's list in the next election.																	
STEM	28 Feb–18 Mar 2025	1,560	18.7			32.7	**11.1**	**6.3**	1.5	7.8	–	2.3	–	2.8	**6.4**	2.1	**6.5**	1.8	14.0
STEM	21 Feb–11 Mar 2025	1,579	17.3			33.7	**10.6**	**6.9**	1.6	8.9	–	1.8	–	2.9	**5.3**	2.7	**5.9**	2.4	16.4
Sanep	1–8 Mar 2025	2,300	18.1			34.2	**11.1**	4.8	1.7	7.6	0.8	1.7	1.9	2.5	4.9	2.2	**5.8**	2.7	16.1
NMS	28 Feb–5 Mar 2025	1,013	19.0			31.3	**13.8**	**5.4**	1.6	7.2	1.6	1.6	1.0	2.5	**6.9**	2.3	**5.5**	0.3	12.3
STEM	14 Feb–4 Mar 2025	1,579	17.1			35.6	**10.9**	**7.3**	1.9	7.5	–	2.7	–	2.6	4.5	2.6	**5.4**	1.9	18.5
Ipsos	24–28 Feb 2025	1,035	20.6			36.4	**10.6**	**5.1**	1.3	7.5	0.6	2.1	1.1	2.0	4.8	2.6	4.8	0.3	15.8
Kantar CZ	10–28 Feb 2025	1,200	17.5			37.5	**12.5**	**6.5**	2.0	6.5	–	–	–	–	**6.0**	–	3.5	8.0	20.0
Median	1–28 Feb 2025	1,019	18.5			33.5	**10.0**	**6.0**	–	7.0	2.0	–	–	–	**8.0**	3.5	**6.5**	5.0	15.0
STEM	7–25 Feb 2025	1,571	16.2			33.6	**12.9**	**6.8**	2.1	8.1	–	2.9	–	2.5	**5.0**	2.5	**5.7**	1.7	17.4
STEM	31 Jan–18 Feb 2025	?	18.5			34.7	**11.4**	**5.9**	2.0	8.1	–	2.1	–	2.9	4.5	2.3	**5.7**	1.9	16.2
STEM	24 Jan–11 Feb 2025	1,548	19.0			34.1	**11.1**	**5.3**	2.3	8.2	–	1.3	–	2.9	4.2	3.0	**6.9**	1.7	15.1
NMS	4–9 Feb 2025	1,003	18.7			34.5	**12.2**	4.8	1.9	7.8	0.5	1.9	0.5	3.6	4.8	2.8	**5.2**	0.8	15.8
Sanep	3–8 Feb 2025	2,450	17.7			35.6	**11.5**	**5.5**	1.4	7.8	0.8	1.3	1.8	2.4	4.3	2.1	**5.6**	2.2	17.9
STEM	17 Jan–4 Feb 2025	1,538	19.8			35.3	**10.3**	**5.3**	2.6	8.1	–	1.5	–	2.1	4.5	2.5	**6.7**	1.3	15.5
Kantar CZ	13–31 Jan 2025	1,019	19.0			33.5	**12.5**	**7.5**	–	6.5	–	–	–	2.0	**7.5**	–	3.5	8.0	14.5
Median	7–31 Jan 2025	1,041	17.0			33.0	**11.0**	4.0	2.0	8.0	2.5	–	–	2.0	**8.0**	3.5	**6.0**	3.0	16.0
Ipsos	24–29 Jan 2025	1,006	20.5			36.7	**12.0**	**5.0**	1.5	5.7	0.7	0.9	1.6	1.9	**5.4**	1.6	**5.5**	0.9	16.2
STEM	10–28 Jan 2025	1,549	18.8			35.1	**10.6**	**6.4**	2.1	8.7	–	1.6	1.0	2.1	4.1	2.8	**5.8**	0.9	16.3
STEM	3–21 Jan 2025	2,573	18.2			34.9	**11.1**	**6.7**	1.8	8.5	–	1.8	1.2	2.3	3.9	3.3	**5.0**	1.3	16.7
	16 Jan 2025	Přísaha and Motorists dissolves.																	
STEM	3–14 Jan 2025	2,056	18.1			34.4	**9.9**	**7.3**	1.9	8.2	–	1.5	1.7	2.8	4.9	3.0	4.9	1.3	16.3
NMS	9–13 Jan 2025	1,002	17.1			32.3	**12.4**	**6.1**	2.2	6.9	1.1	1.7	1.7	4.0	**5.9**	2.5	**5.1**	1.0	15.2
STEM	3–7 Jan 2025	1,533	18.4			33.9	**9.4**	**6.8**	1.9	8.1	–	1.5	1.9	3.0	**5.0**	2.9	**5.3**	1.9	15.5
NMS	3–9 Dec 2024	1,001	18.3			33.6	**11.2**	**5.9**	1.7	7.9	1.6	0.9	1.3	2.3	**5.3**	3.7	**5.2**	1.1	15.3
	16 Nov 2024	Communist Party of Bohemia and Moravia announces it will lead the Stačilo! list.																	
STEM	31 Oct–8 Nov 2024	1,081	21.1			33.7	**8.4**	**5.9**	2.4	8.9	0.6	2.1	1.1	2.6	4.1	3.0	**5.5**	0.6	12.6
Kantar CZ	21 Oct–8 Nov 2024	1,200	21.0			37.0	**12.0**	**7.0**	2.0	7.0	–	–	–	–	2.5	2.0	3.5	6.0	16.0
Kantar CZ	21 Oct–8 Nov 2024	1,200	15.0	4.0	3.0	37.0	**11.5**	**7.0**	2.0	7.0	–	–	–	–	2.5	2.0	3.5	5.5	22.0
Median	1–31 Oct 2024	1,018	12.0	3.5	4.0	33.5	**11.0**	**6.5**	–	5.0	–	–	2.0	3.5	**6.0**	3.0	**5.0**	3.0	21.5
	28 Oct 2024	The leaders of ODS, KDU-ČSL and TOP 09 sign an agreement to run in the next election as SPOLU again.																	
STEM	2–11 Oct 2024	1,093	14.2	2.7	3.7	32.1	**10.6**	**5.9**	1.1	9.4	1.1	1.6	–	4.6	3.2	2.6	**5.3**	1.9	17.9
Kantar CZ	30 Sep–11 Oct 2024	1,019	14.5	3.5	4.5	35.5	**13.0**	**5.0**	–	6.5	–	2.0	–	3.0	2.5	2.5	3.0	4.5	21.0
NMS	4–9 Oct 2024	1,301	12.2	2.7	3.8	32.9	**12.0**	**6.8**	2.0	7.5	–	–	–	4.3	3.6	2.9	4.6	4.7	20.7
	1 Oct 2024	Czech Pirate Party leaves the Government.																	
Median	1–30 Sep 2024	1,020	11.5	2.0	4.5	33.0	**11.0**	**8.5**	2.0	7.0	–	–	2.0	4.5	3.5	4.0	4.5	2.0	21.5
NMS	3–10 Sep 2024	1,297	11.3	1.9	4.5	32.1	**9.2**	**7.8**	2.2	7.7	1.1	2.3	1.1	**5.2**	**5.5**	2.5	4.5	5.2	20.8
STEM	29 Aug–8 Sep 2024	1,095	14.9	3.5	**5.6**	33.4	**6.8**	**7.8**	2.7	7.4	1.0	1.8	1.0	3.3	2.6	2.8	4.6	0.9	18.5
Phoenix Research (Note: 'Don't know' responses have been merged with 'Others' in this poll)	1–8 Sep 2024	1,005	14.8	5.4	4.2	26.5	**6.4**	**8.3**	–	7.0	–	–	1.0	**5.1**	–	1.4	**5.1**	14.8	11.7
Median	1–31 Aug 2024	1,011	13.0	3.5	4.5	32.5	**9.5**	**9.5**	2.0	11.0	–	–	2.0	3.5	–	2.0	3.5	2.5	19.5
NMS	1–8 Aug 2024	1,291	14.3	2.4	4.7	29.3	**9.6**	**8.0**	2.3	6.0	1.0	1.7	1.5	4.6	4.1	2.8	**5.7**	2.0	15.0
Median	1–31 July 2024	1,013	14.0	2.5	4.0	33.0	**9.0**	**8.0**	2.5	8.0	2.0	–	2.0	**5.0**	–	3.5	4.0	2.5	19.0
Phoenix Research	Jul 2024	?	14.5	3.8	5.5	26.9	**7.2**	**7.7**	–	5.8	–	–	–	–	–	–	4.1	24.5	12.4
NMS	4–12 Jul 2024	1,307	11.3	3.2	5.2	28.2	**10.1**	**9.1**	1.6	6.9	1.2	3.2	1.4	**7.2**	–	3.2	**5.6**	2.6	16.9
Median	1–30 Jun 2024	1,003	12.0	4.5	5.0	30.5	**9.0**	**10.5**	2.0	8.5	–	–	1.5	**5.0**	–	2.5	4.5	4.5	18.5
Kantar CZ	10–21 Jun 2024	1,035	16.0	3.0	4.0	34.0	**8.5**	**9.0**	2.5	6.0	–	2.5	–	4.5	–	2.5	3.0	4.5	18.0
2024 European Parliament Election	7–8 Jun 2024	N/A	22.3			26.1	8.7	6.2	1.6	5.7		1.8	2.2	10.3		1.9	9.6	2.9	3.8
STEM	Jun 2024	1,609	14.8	2.5	4.5	32.9	**6.8**	**8.7**	2.0	7.3	1.7	2.0	1.9	3.7	2.7	2.5	**5.1**	0.9	18.1
Median	6–31 May 2024	1,031	14.5	2.0	**5.5**	33.0	**8.5**	**10.0**	1.5	7.5	1.5	–	3.0	3.0	–	3.5	4.0	2.0	18.5
Sanep	15–23 May 2024	2,300	10.4	2.2	3.9	32.1	**6.5**	**11.1**	–	10.1	–	4.0	**6.1**	3.8	–	3.7	3.3	2.8	21.0
Kantar CZ	22 Apr–10 May 2024	1,008	15.5	3.5	**5.0**	32.0	**7.5**	**11.0**	2.5	9.0	–	–	–	3.5	–	3.0	2.5	5.0	16.5
Sanep	18–24 Apr 2024	1,900	12.1	1.8	4.1	32.6	**5.8**	**10.7**	–	10.3	–	3.6	**5.8**	3.2	–	3.1	3.8	3.1	20.5
Median	5 Mar–3 Apr 2024	1,041	14.0	3.5	3.5	32.0	**6.0**	**10.5**	3.0	7.0	2.0	–	4.0	3.5	–	4.5	4.5	2.0	18.0
Kantar CZ	18 Mar–5 Apr 2024	1,015	16.0	3.0	4.5	34.5	**6.5**	**10.5**	2.0	8.0	–	2.5	2.0	2.5	–	3.0	3.0	2.0	18.5
Sanep	25–31 Mar 2024	1,700	10.1	1.5	4.2	33.5	**7.1**	**11.3**	–	11.1	–	3.5	**5.3**	3.4	–	2.3	3.5	3.2	21.6
STEM	15–25 Mar 2024	1,096	14.5	3.1	**5.2**	32.9	**6.6**	**10.5**	2.1	9.3	0.8	1.9	1.9	2.8	–	3.6	4.5	0.4	18.4
Median	1 Feb–4 Mar 2024	1006	12.5	3.0	**5.5**	31.0	**9.0**	**11.0**	2.0	9.5	–	–	2.0	3.0	–	4.5	4.0	3.0	18.5
Kantar CZ	12 Feb–1 Mar 2024	1,015	14.5	2.0	**5.0**	38.5	**7.0**	**9.5**	–	9.0	–	–	–	–	–	2.5	2.5	9.5	24.0
Sanep	22–28 Feb 2024	1,560	10.3	1.6	4.4	33.1	**6.4**	**11.2**	–	11.5	–	3.7	**5.5**	3.5	–	2.5	3.2	3.1	21.6
Kantar CZ	15 Jan–2 Feb 2024	1,013	15.5	3.5	**5.0**	35.0	**6.5**	**9.5**	–	9.5	–	2.5	–	3.5	–	4.0	3.0	2.5	19.5
Median	15 Jan–1 Feb 2024	1019	12.0	3.0	**5.5**	31.5	**7.0**	**13.0**	1.5	10.5	–	–	3.0	3.0	–	4.0	4.5	1.5	18.5
Sanep	22–29 Jan 2024	1,427	10.5	1.7	4.3	33.4	**6.1**	**10.5**	–	11.7	–	2.7	**5.3**	3.6	–	2.4	2.9	4.9	21.7
	29 Jan 2024	The leaders of Přísaha and Motorists for Themselves sign an agreement to run in the next election as Přísaha and Motorists.																	
STEM	18–27 Jan 2024	1,092	13.2	2.7	**5.0**	33.4	**7.0**	**11.3**	2.5	10.0	1.4	1.7	0.7	2.6	–	3.1	4.8	0.5	20.2
Median	29 Nov–30 Dec 2023	988	13.0	2.5	**6.0**	35.0	**6.5**	**10.5**	1.5	9.0	–	–	2.5	2.5	–	4.5	4.5	2.0	22.0
Sanep	23–29 Nov 2023	1,756	11.3	2.6	4.7	33.0	**5.8**	**9.9**	–	11.2	–	2.7	**5.8**	2.6	–	2.8	3.1	5.1	21.7
STEM	Nov 2023	1,097	11.6	3.5	**5.2**	33.2	**6.4**	**10.2**	1.6	12.0	1.2	2.3	1.9	2.9	–	4.5	3.0	0.4	21.2
Sanep	19–25 Oct 2023	1,826	11.6	3.6	4.7	33.1	**5.6**	**8.9**	–	10.3	–	2.4	**5.2**	2.7	–	3.1	2.9	5.3	21.5
Kantar CZ	16 Oct–3 Nov 2023	1,200	15.5	2.5	4.5	32.5	**7.0**	**10.5**	–	10.5	–	–	2.0	2.5	–	3.5	3.5	5.5	17.0
Median	3–31 Oct 2023	1,016	13.5	3.5	**6.0**	35.0	**6.0**	**9.0**	1.5	10.5	–	–	2.5	3.0	–	3.5	3.0	3.0	21.5
Median	5 Sep–2 Oct 2023	1,017	13.0	4.0	**5.5**	34.0	**6.5**	**11.5**	2.0	9.5	–	–	2.5	–	–	4.0	4.5	3.0	21.0
Sanep	21–27 Sep 2023	1,632	11.8	3.7	4.6	32.9	**5.2**	**9.1**	–	10.2	–	2.2	**5.7**	2.8	–	2.7	3.2	5.9	21.1
Kantar CZ	11–29 Sep 2023	982	12.0	3.5	**5.0**	33.5	**7.5**	**8.5**	2.0	9.5	–	3.0	3.0	4.0	–	3.5	3.0	2.0	21.5
STEM	7–17 Sep 2023	1,123	13.1	**5.0**	**5.4**	30.8	**5.3**	**9.6**	2.7	10.9	1.1	2.8	1.2	3.2	–	4.0	4.3	0.6	17.7
Median	1 Jul–8 Aug 2023	1,019	15.0	4.0	**5.5**	33.0	**6.5**	**12.0**	1.5	8.0	–	–	1.5	3.0	–	**5.0**	3.0	1.5	18.0
Median	12–30 Jun 2023	1,007	14.0	2.0	**5.0**	35.5	**5.5**	**11.0**	2.5	10.0	2.5	–	1.5	2.5	–	4.0	2.5	1.5	21.5
Kantar CZ	15 May–2 Jun 2023	962	17.0	4.0	3.5	33.5	**6.5**	**11.5**	2.0	8.0	–	–	2.0	2.5	–	3.0	3.5	3.0	16.5
Median	1 May–2 Jun 2023	1,012	15.0	4.0	**5.5**	34.5	**6.0**	**10.5**	–	8.5	2.5	–	–	2.0	–	4.0	3.5	4.0	19.5
STEM	18–29 May 2023	1,141	14.6	3.4	4.7	33.5	**5.8**	**10.8**	2.3	9.3	1.4	2.2	1.2	2.9	–	4.1	3.8	0.2	18.9
Kantar CZ	17 Apr–5 May 2023	981	17.0	**5.0**	**5.0**	30.5	**6.0**	**11.0**	2.0	9.0	–	–	2.0	2.5	–	**5.5**	2.5	2.0	13.5
Median	1 Apr–2 May 2023	1,015	15.0	**5.5**	4.5	31.0	**7.5**	**10.5**	2.0	8.5	1.5	–	–	2.0	–	4.0	4.0	4.0	16.0
Sanep	20–26 Apr 2023	1,543	13.2	3.8	4.2	33.5	4.7	**10.1**	–	9.4	–	–	**6.7**	–	–	–	–	14.4	20.3
Phoenix Research	Apr 2023	–	14.2	3.1	**5.3**	31.5	**7.8**	**8.9**	–	9.6	–	–	**5.2**	–	–	1.6	–	12.8	17.3
Kantar CZ	20 Mar–6 Apr 2023	970	20.0	3.0	4.0	29.5	**5.5**	**11.0**	–	8.0	–	–	3.0	3.5	–	**5.0**	2.5	5.0	9.5
Median	2 Mar–3 Apr 2023	1,006	15.5	4.0	**5.0**	34.5	**8.0**	**8.5**	2.0	10.0	3.0	–	–	2.0	–	4.0	3.0	1.5	19.0
Sanep	23–29 Mar 2023	1,432	13.3	4.1	3.4	33.1	4.3	**9.9**	–	9.6	–	–	**6.4**	–	–	–	–	15.9	19.8
Median	12 Feb–7 Mar 2023	1,011	14.5	3.5	**5.0**	32.0	**7.0**	**11.5**	2.0	9.5	1.5	–	–	2.5	–	**5.0**	3.5	2.5	17.5
Kantar CZ	13 Feb–3 Mar 2023	951	21.5	4.0	**5.0**	29.5	**7.0**	**9.0**	–	8.5	–	–	–	2.5	–	4.5	2.0	6.5	8.0
Phoenix	Feb–Mar 2023	1,022	14.1	**5.8**	**6.5**	27.6	**5.6**	**8.9**	–	9.5	–	–	4.3	–	–	2.2	1.2	14.3	13.5
Sanep	9–12 Feb 2023	1,536	13.5	3.1	3.9	32.7	4.6	**7.9**	–	9.3	–	–	**6.1**	–	–	3.0	–	15.9	19.2
STEM	29 Nov–5 Dec 2022	2,005	13.9	4.9	4.6	30.8	**6.4**	**9.4**	–	12.4	–	–	–	–	–	4.0	4.2	9.5	16.9
Kantar CZ	17 Oct–4 Nov 2022	1,200	21.5	3.5	**5.5**	26.5	**6.0**	**11.5**	–	11.0	2.0	–	–	2.5	–	3.5	2.5	4.0	5.0
Median	1–31 Oct 2022	1,005	13.5	**6.0**	**5.0**	31.5	**5.5**	**11.0**	2.0	12.0	1.5	–	–	2.0	–	**5.5**	2.0	2.5	18.0
Kantar CZ	12–30 Sep 2022	997	18.0	**6.0**	4.0	29.5	**7.5**	**9.0**	2.0	11.5	–	–	–	4.0	–	2.5	2.0	4.0	11.5
Median	1–30 Sep 2022	1,010	16.0	2.5	6.0	30.5	**5.5**	**11.0**	2.0	11.5	2.0	–	–	3.0	–	4.5	2.5	2.5	14.5
Sanep	8–14 Sep 2022	1,678	13.1	3.4	3.9	29.9	4.5	**7.4**	–	12.6	–	–	**5.3**	–	–	–	3.5	16.4	15.7
STEM	1–8 Sep 2022	2,003	14.2	4.5	**5.0**	30.0	**5.0**	**9.4**	–	14.3	–	–	–	3.5	–	4.0	–	10.1	15.7
Kantar CZ	15 Aug–2 Sep 2022	893	19.5	4.0	4.5	30.5	**6.5**	**8.5**	–	11.0	–	2.0	–	3.0	–	3.0	3.5	4.0	11.0
Median	1–31 Aug 2022	1,005	16.0	3.5	3.5	29.0	4.0	**11.5**	2.0	14.0	2.0	–	–	3.5	–	5.0	3.5	2.5	13.0
Sanep	25–30 Aug 2022	1,632	13.9	3.6	3.4	31.1	4.2	**7.2**	–	13.1	–	–	3.9	–	–	3.1	–	16.5	17.2
STEM	4–11 Aug 2022	2,093	15.5	3.4	**5.6**	31.1	**5.5**	**9.3**	–	11.9	–	–	–	–	–	4.8	3.4	9.6	15.6
Median	8 Jul–2 Aug 2022	1,005	15.5	4.5	**5.0**	30.0	**5.5**	**10.5**	2.0	12.5	2.5	–	–	3.0	–	**5.0**	2.5	1.5	14.5
Median	20 Jun–4 Jul 2022	1,543	16.1	4.6	**5.2**	29.0	4.8	**11.8**	1.8	12.5	1.6		–	2.2	–	**5.6**	2.8	1.8	12.9
Sanep	23–27 Jun 2022	1,543	16.1	4.1	3.1	29.2	4.9	**5.7**	–	13.7	–	3.5	–	–	–	3.0	–	16.7	13.1
Kantar CZ	16 May–2 Jun 2022	962	22.5	3.5	4.0	28.0	**6.5**	**8.5**	2.0	11.0	–	–	–	2.0	–	4.5	2.5	5.0	5.5
Median	1 May–2 Jun 2022	1,018	16.5	4.5	4.5	28.5	**8.5**	**9.0**	–	11.5	2.5	–	–	3.0	–	**5.5**	3.0	3.0	12.0
Sanep	26–30 May 2022	1,429	19.6	4.0	3.3	30.1	**7.8**	4.6	1.0	14.3	–	3.6	–	–	–	2.3	–	9.4	10.5
Kantar CZ	8–29 Apr 2022	1,200	26.0	4.5	3.0	27.5	**10.0**	**5.0**	2.0	11.0	–	–	–	3.0	–	2.5	2.0	3.5	1.0
Sanep	13–20 Apr 2022	1,631	19.8	3.9	**6.2**	28.1	**8.7**	4.8	0.8	12.9	–	3.3	–	–	–	2.6	–	8.9	8.3
Kantar CZ	14 Mar–1 Apr 2022	1,200	22.5	4.0	**5.0**	27.5	**10.0**	**7.5**	–	9.5	2.0	–	–	3.5	–	2.5	2.5	3.5	5.0
Sanep	10–16 Mar 2022	1,673	19.1	4.8	**6.5**	27.9	**9.8**	**5.1**	0.9	12.7	–	3.4	–	–	–	3.0	–	6.8	8.8
Kantar CZ	14 Feb–4 Mar 2022	1,200	21.0	**5.5**	**6.5**	25.0	**11.0**	**7.5**	–	11.5	–	–	–	3.0	–	3.0	2.0	4.0	4.0
Sanep	24–28 Feb 2022	1,673	17.3	4.6	**6.4**	28.7	**9.5**	**5.2**	1.2	11.2	–	2.1	–	–	–	3.7	2.4	7.7	11.4
Phoenix (Note: Reporting of this poll is incomplete)	Feb 2022	1,066	15.4	**6.5**	**5.1**	26.4	**10.3**	**7.1**	–	7.5	–	–	–	–	–	–	–	–	11.0
Sanep	20–26 Jan 2022	1,839	14.7	4.1	**6.0**	29.1	**9.2**	**5.4**	1.2	11.3	–	1.8	–	–	–	4.2	3.2	6.9	14.4
Sanep	18–24 Nov 2021	1,912	14.1	4.3	**6.2**	27.6	**10.7**	**7.6**	1.0	9.9	–	–	–	3.2	–	**5.1**	3.8	6.5	13.5
Kantar CZ	1–19 Nov 2021	935	15.5	3.5	**7.0**	27.0	**13.0**	**8.0**	–	9.5	2.5	–	–	2.5	–	4.0	3.5	4.0	11.5
	6 Nov 2021	Pirates and Mayors dissolves.																	
2021 legislative election	8–9 Oct 2021	N/A	27.8			27.1	15.6		1.0	9.6	2.8		N/A	4.7	N/A	4.7	3.6	2.9	0.7

=== Seat projections ===
The Czech Chamber of Deputies has 200 seats, 101 seats are needed for a majority.

Polling firm	Fieldwork date	SPOLU			ANO	STAN	Piráti		SPD				Přísaha	Motorists for Themselves	Stačilo!		Lead	Gov.	Opp.
Polling firm	Fieldwork date	ODS	KDU–ČSL	TOP 09	ANO	STAN	Piráti	Z	SPD	Tricolour	Svobodní	PRO	Přísaha	Motorists for Themselves	SOCDEM	/	Lead	Gov.	Opp.
2025 legislative election	3–4 Oct 2025	52			80	22	18		15				0	13	0		28	74	126
2025 legislative election	3–4 Oct 2025	27 (Note: Civil Democratic Party: 26 seats Independent: 1 seat)	16	9	80 (Note: ANO: 76 seats Independent: 4 seats)	22 (Note: Mayors and Independents: 20 seats Mayors for the Liberec Region: 2 seats)	18 (Note: Czech Pirate Party: 16 seats Green Party: 2 seats)		15 (Note: Freedom and Direct Democracy: 10 seats Svobodní: 2 seats Tricolour: 1 seat Law, Respect, Expertise: 1 seat Independent: 1 seat)				0	13 (Note: Motorists for Themselves: 6 seats Independent: 7 seats)	0		53	74	126
NMS	24–28 Sep 2025	38			66	23	19		26				0	15	13		28	61	139
STEM	20–26 Sep 2025	44			66	24	21		27				0	10	8		22	68	132
Median	1–25 Sep 2025	46			67	22	22		28				0	0	15		21	68	132
STEM	18–24 Sep 2025	46			63	25	20		29				0	9	8		17	71	129
STEM	28 Aug–16 Sep 2025	41			68	24	19		24				0	9	15		27	65	135
Sanep	3–12 Sep 2025	35			76	22	13		30				0	10	14		41	57	143
STEM	21 Aug–9 Sep 2025	42			69	20	20		26				0	10	13		27	62	138
NMS	1 Sep–7 Sep 2025	43			71	26	18		25				0	8	9		28	69	131
STEM	14 Aug–2 Sep 2025	43			68	21	19		27				0	8	14		25	64	136
STEM	7–26 Aug 2025	46			69	20	19		27				0	7	12		23	66	134
STEM	31 Jul–19 Aug 2025	47			77	22	18		23				0	0	13		30	69	131
STEM	24 Jul–12 Aug 2025	45			75	22	19		25				0	0	14		30	67	133
NMS	1–5 Aug 2025	41			66	21	17		30				0	8	17		25	62	138
STEM	17 Jul–5 Aug 2025	47			73	21	16		27				0	0	16		26	68	132
Median	1 Jul–31 Jul 2025	44			73	25	16		31				0	0	0	11	29	69	131
STEM	10 Jul–29 Jul 2025	46			73	21	16		28				0	0	16		27	67	133
STEM	1 Jul–22 Jul 2025	47			75	24	14		26				0	0	14		28	71	129
STEM	24 Jun–15 Jul 2025	43			73	25	16		27				0	0	0	16	30	68	132
STEM	19 Jun–8 Jul 2025	47			74	26	17		29				0	0	0	10	27	73	127
NMS	2–7 Jul 2025	50			69	25	17		29				0	0	0	10	19	75	125
STEM	12 Jun–1 Jul 2025	47			74	26	17		29				0	0	0	7	27	73	127
STEM	5–24 Jun 2025	52			81	21	18		28				0	0	0	0	29	73	127
STEM	30 May–17 Jun 2025	48			78	21	15	0	29				0	0	0	9	30	69	131
STEM	30 May–10 Jun 2025	52			77	23	12	0	28				0	0	0	8	25	75	125
STEM	23 May–4 Jun 2025	55			74	23	10	0	29				0	0	0	9	19	78	122
NMS	30 May–3 Jun 2025	45			74	25	10	0	38				0	0	0	8	29	70	130
Median	1–31 May 2025	47			72	24	12	0	30				0	0	0	15	25	71	129
Kantar CZ	12–30 May 2025	53			84	27	13	0	23				0	0	0	0	31	80	120
STEM	9–27 May 2025	52			77	25	10	0	28				0	0	0	8	25	77	123
STEM	30 Apr–20 May 2025	47			77	23	14	0	27				0	0	0	12	30	70	130
STEM	25 Apr–13 May 2025	47			77	23	14	0	27				0	0	0	12	30	70	130
NMS	6–12 May 2025	55			80	21	10	0	34				0	0	0	0	25	76	124
STEM	18 Apr–6 May 2025	48			76	23	12	0	28				0	0	0	13	28	71	129
Median	1–30 Apr 2025	44			70	20	14	0	24				0	15	0	13	26	64	136
STEM	11–29 Apr 2025	48			80	22	10	0	28				0	0	0	12	32	70	130
STEM	1–22 Apr 2025	46			77	22	10	0	26				0	9	0	10	31	68	132
STEM	24 Mar–15 Apr 2025	46			79	23	11	0	25				0	8	0	8	33	69	131
NMS	2–9 Apr 2025	48			68	27	10	0	28				0	10	0	9	20	75	125
STEM	21 Mar–8 Apr 2025	46			75	25	11	0	23				0	11	0	9	29	71	129
STEM	14 Mar–1 Apr 2025	46			75	24	11	0	23				0	12	0	9	29	70	130
STEM	7–25 Mar 2025	46			75	25	10	0	19	0	0	0	0	13	0	12	29	71	129
STEM	28 Feb–18 Mar 2025	43			80	24	11	0	16	0	0	0	0	13	0	13	37	67	133
STEM	21 Feb–11 Mar	41			83	24	13	0	19	0	0	0	0	9	0	11	42	65	135
NMS	28 Feb–5 Mar 2025	44			77	32	9	0	15	0	0	0	0	14	0	9	33	72	128
STEM	14 Feb–4 Mar 2025	41			93	24	16	0	17	0	0	0	0	0	0	9	52	65	135
STEM	31 Jan–27 Feb 2025	38			83	28	13	0	18	0	0	0	0	9	0	11	45	66	134
NMS	4–9 Feb 2025	50			94	30	0	0	18	0	0	0	0	0	0	8	44	80	120
STEM	17 Jan–4 Feb 2025	47			88	23	9	0	18	0	0	0	0	0	0	15	41	70	130
STEM	10–28 Jan 2025	46			89	24	10	0	19	0	0	0	0	0	0	12	43	70	130
STEM	3–21 Jan 2025	46			89	25	13	0	19	0	0	0	0	0	0	8	43	71	129
STEM	3–14 Jan 2025	46			95	22	19	0	18	0	0	0	0	0	0	0	49	68	132
NMS	9–13 Jan 2025	42			83	29	11	0	15	0	0	0	0	11	0	9	41	71	129
STEM	7–9 Jan 2025	44			85	22	13	0	18	0	0	0	0	9	0	9	41	66	134
Median	21 Nov–31 Dec 2024	30	0	0	88	34	15	0	0	0	0	0	0	19	0	14	58	64	136
NMS	3–9 Dec 2024	44			84	25	11	0	18	0	0	0	0	9	0	9	40	69	131
Median	1–30 Nov 2024	29	0	0	82	25	16	0	16	0	0	0	0	16	0	16	53	54	146
Median	1–31 Oct 2024	30	0	0	85	27	16	0	13	0	0	0	0	16	0	13	55	57	143
Median	1–30 Sep 2024	34	0	0	86	30	25	0	25	0	0	0	0	0	0	0	52	89	111
Median	1–31 Aug 2024	34	0	0	86	25	25	0	30	0	0	0	0	0	0	0	52	84	116
Median	1–31 July 2024	35	0	0	85	24	21	0	21	0	0	0	14	0	0	0	50	80	120
Median	1–30 Jun 2024	30	0	13	74	22	26	0	22	0	0	0	13	0	0	0	44	91	109
Kantar CZ	10–21 Jun 2024	43	0	0	95	18	25	0	19	0	0	0	0	0	0	0	52	86	114
Median	6–31 May 2024	31	0	15	79	24	29	0	22	0	0	0	0	0	0	0	48	99	101
Kantar CZ	22 Apr–10 May 2024	41	0	0	96	15	26	0	22	0	0	0	0	0	0	0	55	82	118
Median	5 Apr–2 May 2024	35	0	0	89	22	27	0	27	0	0	0	0	0	0	0	54	84	116
Median	5 Mar–3 Apr 2024	41	0	0	92	17	30	0	20	0	0	0	0	0	0	0	51	88	112
Median	1 Feb–4 Mar 2024	31	0	15	79	22	29	0	24	0	0	0	0	0	0	0	48	97	103
Kantar CZ	12 Feb–1 Mar 2024	35	0	9	95	15	24	0	22	0	0	0	0	0	0	0	60	83	117
Median	15 Jan–1 Feb 2024	30	0	14	79	17	33	0	27	0	0	0	0	0	0	0	46	94	106
Median	29 Nov–30 Dec 2023	33	0	15	87	15	27	0	23	0	0	0	0	0	0	0	54	90	110
Median	3–31 Oct 2023	35	0	15	87	15	23	0	27	0	0	0	0	0	0	0	50	86	114
Median	5 Sep–2 Oct 2023	35	0	13	85	16	29	0	24	0	0	0	0	0	0	0	50	91	109
Median	1 Jul–8 Aug 2023	35	0	12	77	16	29	0	19	0	0	0	0	0	12	0	42	92	108
Median	12–30 Jun 2023	37	0	14	87	15	26	0	21	0	0	0	0	0	0	0	50	92	108
Median	1 May–2 Jun 2023	37	0	14	87	15	26	0	21	0	0	0	0	0	0	0	50	92	108
Kantar CZ	17 Apr–5 May 2023	49	0	0	81	14	25	0	20	0	0	0	0	0	11	0	32	88	112
Median	2 Mar–3 Apr 2023	38	0	12	85	20	21	0	24	0	0	0	0	0	0	0	47	91	109
STEM	1–18 Sep 2022	37	0	11	82	11	22	0	37	0	0	0	0	0	0	0	45	81	119
2021 legislative election	8–9 Oct 2021	71			72	37		0	20	0		N/A	0	N/A	0	0	1	108	92
2021 legislative election	8–9 Oct 2021	34	23	14	72	33	4	0	20	0	0	N/A	0	N/A	0	0	38	108	92

== Hypothetical scenarios ==
=== European Parliament election coalitions ===
The polls in this section took place following the 2024 European Parliament elections. The SPOLU coalition was reformed; Přísaha joined with the Motorists; KSČM created the Stačilo! coalition; SPD and Tricolour formed a joint list.

Polling firm	Fieldwork date	Sample size	SPOLU			ANO	STAN	Piráti	PRO	SPD	Tricolour	Svobodní	Přísaha and Motorists		SOC DEM	/	Z	Others	Lead
Polling firm	Fieldwork date	Sample size	ODS	KDU–ČSL	TOP 09	ANO	STAN	Piráti	PRO	SPD	Tricolour	Svobodní	Přísaha	Motorists for Themselves	SOC DEM	/	Z	Others	Lead
SANEP	5–11 Sep 2024	2,250	19.5			30.2	8.4	7.1	–	13.8		1.5	6.5		2.5	5.9	2.0	2.6	10.5
NMS	1–8 Aug 2024	1,291	21.4			29.3	9.6	8.0	8.5			1.7	8.7		2.8	5.7	2.3	2.0	7.9
2024 European Parliament Election	7–8 Jun 2024	N/A	22.3			26.1	8.7	6.2	2.2	5.7		1.8	10.3		1.9	9.6	1.6	2.9	3.8
2021 legislative election	8–9 Oct 2021	N/A	27.8			27.1	15.6		N/A	9.6	2.8		4.7	N/A	4.7	3.6	1.0	2.9	0.7

=== Polls including SPOLU ===
The polls in this section took place after the Pirates and Mayors alliance, which ran in the 2021 election, ruled out working together at the next election. They show the polls if the ODS, KDU-ČSL and TOP 09 join to continue the SPOLU alliance that contested the 2021 election and came in first place, over ANO. These polls took place prior to the announcement SPOLU would be recreated in the next election.

Polling firm	Fieldwork date	Sample size	SPOLU			ANO	STAN	Piráti	SPD	Přísaha	SOCDEM	/	Tricolour–S–S		Z	PRO	Motorists for Themselves	Others	Lead
Polling firm	Fieldwork date	Sample size	ODS	KDU–ČSL	TOP 09	ANO	STAN	Piráti	SPD	Přísaha	SOCDEM	/	Tricolour	Svobodní	Z	PRO	Motorists for Themselves	Others	Lead
Kantar CZ	30 Sep–11 Oct 2024	1,019	20.0			36.5	14.0	5.0	7.0	3.0	2.5	3.0	–	2.0	–	–	2.5	4.5	16.5
Kantar CZ	10–21 Jun 2024	1,035	22.5			34.5	8.5	9.0	6.0	4.5	2.5	3.0	–	2.5	2.5	–	–	4.5	12.0
Kantar CZ	22 Apr–10 May 2024	1,008	22.5			32.5	7.5	11.0	9.0	3.5	3.0	2.5	–	–	2.5	–	–	6.0	10.0
Kantar CZ	18 Mar–5 Apr 2024	1,015	21.5			35.5	6.5	11.0	8.0	2.5	3.0	3.0	–	2.5	2.0	2.0	–	2.5	14.0
Kantar CZ	12 Feb–1 Mar 2024	1,015	20.0			39.0	7.5	10.0	9.0	–	2.5	2.5	–	2.0	2.0	–	–	5.5	19.0
Kantar CZ	15 Jan–2 Feb 2024	1,013	22.5			35.5	7.0	10.0	10.0	3.5	4.0	3.0	–	2.5	–	–	–	2.0	13.0
Kantar CZ	16 Oct–3 Nov 2023	1,200	21.5			33.0	7.0	10.5	10.5	2.5	3.5	3.5	–	–	–	2.0	–	6.0	11.5
Kantar CZ	11–29 Sep 2023	982	19.5			33.5	7.5	8.5	9.5	4.0	3.5	3.0	–	3.0	2.0	3.0	–	3.0	14.0
Kantar CZ	15 May–2 Jun 2023	955	24.0			33.5	6.0	11.5	8.0	2.5	3.5	3.5	–		2.5	2.0	–	3.0	9.5
Kantar CZ	17 Apr–5 May 2023	964	25.0			31.0	6.5	11.5	9.5	2.5	5.5	2.5	–		2.0	2.0	–	2.0	6.0
Kantar CZ	20 Mar–6 Apr 2023	951	27.5			29.5	5.5	10.5	8.0	3.5	5.0	2.5	–		–	3.0	–	5.0	2.0
2021 legislative election	8–9 Oct 2021	N/A	27.8			27.1	15.6		9.6	4.7	4.7	3.6	2.8		1.0	N/A	N/A	2.9	0.7

=== Polls without alliances ===
The polls in this section took place after various coalitions formed, but polled the results by party, rather than by electoral coalition. The coalitions not included are SPOLU, Stačilo! and SPD's alliance.

Polling firm	Fieldwork date	Sample size	ODS	KDU–ČSL	TOP 09	ANO	STAN	Piráti	SPD	Přísaha	SOCDEM	KSČM	Tricolour	Svobodní	Z	Motorists for Themselves	PRO	Others	Lead
Kantar CZ	9–20 Jun 2025	1,016	14.5	3.0	4.5	33.5	11.5	7.0	10.0	–	–	3.5	–	–	2.0	4.5	–	6.0	19.5
Kantar CZ	12–30 May 2025	1,200	15.0	3.0	3.5	34.5	12.0	6.5	9.0	–	2.0	3.5	–	–	–	4.5	–	6.5	19.5
Kantar CZ	14 Apr–2 May 2025	1,025	14.0	3.0	3.0	35.0	12.5	6.0	8.0	–	2.0	4.0	–	–	–	6.0	–	6.5	21.0
Kantar CZ	17 Mar–4 Apr 2025	1,035	13.5	3.0	3.0	35.5	12.0	5.5	7.0	2.0	2.0	4.5	–	–	2.0	6.5	–	3.5	22.0
Kantar CZ	10–28 Feb 2025	1,200	12.5	3.5	3.0	37.0	12.5	6.5	6.5	–	–	3.5	–	–	2.0	6.0	–	7.0	24.5
Kantar CZ	13–31 Jan 2025	1,019	13.0	3.0	4.0	33.5	12.5	7.5	6.5	2.0	–	3.0	–	–	–	7.5	–	7.5	20.5
Median	21 Nov–31 Dec 2024	1,015	11.5	2.5	4.0	33.5	13.0	6.0	4.5	2.5	3.0	5.0	–	–	2.0	7.0	1.5	3.0	20.5
Phoenix Research	1–13 Dec 2024	1,052	12.8	3.3	3.9	28.5	9.0	4.1	9.1	4.2	2.1	5.0	–	–	–	1.6	1.0	15.4	15.7
Median	1–30 Nov 2024	1023	11.5	2.5	4.5	33.5	10.0	6.5	6.5	2.0	4.0	6.5	–	–	2.5	6.5	–	3.0	22.0
NMS	5–12 Nov 2024	1,306	10.0	2.8	3.8	35.3	11.1	5.7	7.0	3.0	3.3	5.8	0.7	2.4	1.8	4.4	1.8	1.1	24.2
Phoenix Research	1–10 Nov 2024	1,078	16.0	4.4	4.3	32.4	9.9	4.7	10.6	4.5	1.8	6.2	–	–	–	–	1.0	4.2	16.4

=== Polls including SPOLU and PirSTAN ===
The polls in this section include both the SPOLU alliance and the Pirates and Mayors alliance.

==== Graphical summary ====
Local regression graph of polls conducted since the 2021 election by coalition, with SPOLU and PirSTAN

==== Polls ====
Polling firm	Fieldwork date	Sample size	SPOLU			ANO	Pirates and Mayors		SPD	Přísaha	ČSSD	KSČM	Tricolour–S–S		Z	PRO	Others	Lead
Polling firm	Fieldwork date	Sample size	ODS	KDU–ČSL	TOP 09	ANO	STAN	Piráti	SPD	Přísaha	ČSSD	KSČM	Tricolour	Svobodní	Z	PRO	Others	Lead
Kantar CZ	13 Feb–3 Mar 2023	951	31.0			30.5	13.0		9.0	2.5	5.0	2.0	–		–	–	7.0	0.5
Kantar CZ	17 Oct–4 Nov 2022	1,200	31.5			28.0	14.0		11.5	2.5	4.0	3.0	2.0		–	–	3.5	3.5
Kantar CZ	12–30 Sep 2022	997	28.5			31.5	12.0		12.0	4.0	2.5	2.0	–		2.0	–	5.0	3.0
Kantar CZ	15 Aug–2 Sep 2022	893	29.0			32.0	10.0		11.0	3.5	3.5	4.0	–		–	–	7.0	3.0
Kantar CZ	16 May–2 Jun 2022	962	28.5			29.5	12.5		11.5	2.5	5.0	2.5	–		2.5	–	5.5	1.0
Kantar CZ	8–29 Apr 2022	1,200	33.5			28.5	11.5		11.0	3.0	4.0	2.0	–		2.0	–	4.5	5.0
Kantar CZ	14 Mar–4 Apr 2022	1,200	31.5			29.0	15.5		9.5	4.0	3.0	2.5	2.5		–	–	2.5	2.5
Median	1 Mar–1 Apr 2022	1,159	26.5			27.5	16.5		10.0	3.0	5.5	4.0	3.0		–	–	4.0	1.0
Kantar CZ	14 Feb–4 Mar 2022	1,200	32.5			27.5	14.5		12.0	3.5	3.0	2.0	3.0		–	–	2.0	5.0
Median	1 Nov–2 Dec 2021	1,073	26.0			29.5	16.5		8.5	4.0	4.5	4.5	3.0		–	–	3.5	3.5
Kantar CZ	1–19 Nov 2021	935	28.0			28.0	17.0		9.5	3.5	4.0	3.5	3.5		–	–	3.0	Tie
2021 legislative election	8–9 Oct 2021	N/A	27.8			27.1	15.6		9.6	4.7	4.7	3.6	2.8		1.0	N/A	2.9	0.7

=== Seat projections ===
Polling firm	Fieldwork date	SPOLU			ANO	Pirates and Mayors		SPD	Přísaha	ČSSD	KSČM	Tricolour–S–S		Z	Lead
Polling firm	Fieldwork date	ODS	KDU–ČSL	TOP 09	ANO	STAN	Piráti	SPD	Přísaha	ČSSD	KSČM	Tricolour	Svobodní	Z	Lead
Kantar CZ	12 Feb–1 Mar 2024	49			93	14	23	21	0	9	0	0	0	0	44
Kantar CZ	17 Apr–5 May 2023	63			75	13	22	18	0	9	0	0	0	0	12
Kantar CZ	1–19 Nov 2021	71			71	38		20	0	0	0	0		0	Tie
2021 legislative election	8–9 Oct 2021	71			72	37		20	0	0	0	0		0	1
2021 legislative election	8–9 Oct 2021	34	23	14	72	33	4	20	0	0	0	0	0	0	38
