= Generation Movement =

Generation Movement Hnutí Generace
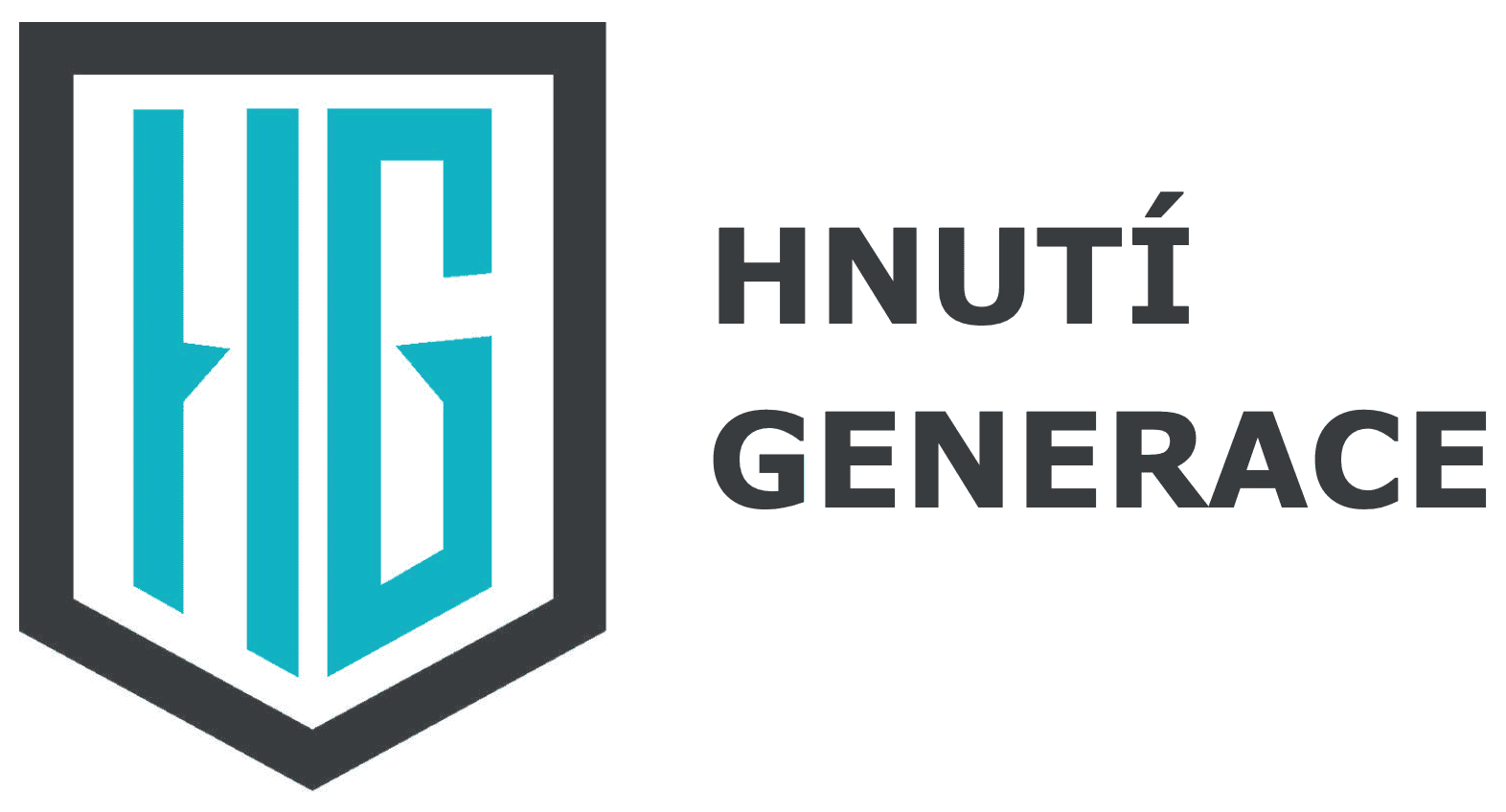
- Leader: Daniel Krutý
- Deputy Leader: Petr Jindřichovský
- Founder: Daniel Krutý
- Founded: 2021
- Registered: 2024
- Headquarters: Prague
- Membership: 100
- Ideology: Liberalism
- Political position: Centre-right
- Colours: Turquoise
- Chamber of Deputies: 0 / 200
- Senate: 0 / 81
- European Parliament: 0 / 21

Website
- hnutigenerace.cz

The Generation Movement (Czech: Hnutí Generace, Generace) is a centre-right, liberal and pro-European political party in the Czech Republic registered in April 2024. It is led by Czech student Daniel Krutý, with vice-chairs Petr Jindřichovský and Martin Szetei.

== History ==
Krutý reportedly decided to form the party in 2021, when he was 15 years old. His friend Martin Szetei helped him develop the idea.

On 25 March 2024, Krutý turned 18, and the party was registered on 12 April 2024 under the name Hnutí Generace, with Krutý as leader, and Szetei and lawyer Petr Jindřichovský as deputy leaders.

The party received wider media attention in November 2024, after Krutý appeared on the program Máte slovo, hosted by Michaela Jílková.

The party's main issues of focus include: democracy, freedom, cybersecurity, protection of digital space, social terrorism, budgetary responsibility, sustainability, and intergenerational and gender cohesion.

== Controversy ==
Daniel Krutý has faced criticism over his connections to Russian interests, particularly the Digital Policy Institute – Millenium 3000, a think tank that has in the past spoken out in line with Russian narratives. In 2022, the institute called on the Czech government to focus on ending the Russo-Ukrainian war, regardless of Ukrainian territorial sovereignty, and spoke out against providing aid to Ukraine, including weapons. In addition, Krutý has been linked to the company Startelecom CZ, through which his father was reported to have had dealings with Russian businessmen. These connections have triggered speculation about the possible influence of Russian interests on Krutý's political activities, which Krutý has publicly denied.

== Election results ==
=== Senate ===
Election	First round			Second round			Seats	Total seats	+/–
Election	Votes	%	Place	Votes	%	Place	Seats	Total seats	+/–
2026	597	0.05	47th				0 / 27	0 / 81	New
