= Bayer (surname) =

Bayer is a surname with various origins. It occurs most commonly in German-speaking countries, where it can be either habitational (Bayer being the male German language demonym for Bavaria) or occupational (derived from the archaic German verb beiern, "to ring (a bell)", thus referring to individuals tasked with ringing church bells). Variants of the surname include Baier, Beyer and Beier.

In the English-speaking world, the surname comes from the ancient kingdom of Bernicia, in what is now southeastern Scotland and North East England. It is derived from the place name Byers, which in turn comes from the Old English byre, meaning cattle-shed. Related names include Byers, Byres, Byer, Buyers and Byris.

== People with this surname ==
- Andrew Bayer (born 1987), American DJ and record producer
- Bryce Bayer (1929–2012), American scientist
- Carl Josef Bayer (1847–1904), Austrian chemist
- Edvín Bayer (1862–1927), Czech botanist
- Edward A. Bayer (born 1947), American-Israeli scientist
- Ernest Bayer (1904–1997), American Olympic rower
- František Bayer (1854–1936), Czech zoologist
- Frederick Bayer (1921–2007), American marine biologist
- Friderika Bayer (born 1971), Hungarian singer
- Friedrich Bayer (1825–1880), German businessman and chemist, founder of Bayer AG
- George Bayer (pioneer) (1800–1839), German music teacher and American pioneer
- Herbert Bayer (1900–1985), Austrian graphic designer, painter, and photographer
- Jacob Bayer (born 2002), American football player
- Johann Bayer (1572–1625), German astronomer
- Josef Bayer (1852–1913), Austrian composer
- Konrad Bayer (1932–1964), Austrian writer and poet
- Margaret Bayer, American mathematician
- Melda Bayer (born 1950), Turkish businesswoman and politician
- Osvaldo Bayer (1927–2018), Argentine journalist and scriptwriter
- Otto Bayer (1902–1982), German inventor and chemist
- Pilar Bayer (born 1946), Spanish mathematician
- Samuel Bayer (born 1965), American film director
- Svend Bayer (born 1946), Danish-British potter
- Theodore Bayer, American newspaper publisher and alleged spy
- Vanessa Bayer (born 1981), American actress and comedian
- William Bayer (born 1939), American author
- Zsolt Bayer (born 1963), Hungarian far-right journalist

== See also ==
- Beyer
- Bayer (disambiguation)
- Bajer (disambiguation)
