= Emil Beier =

SS officer (1893–1985)

Mayor of Ostrava, Czechoslovakia
- In office 1940–1945

Personal details
- Born: 29 November 1893
- Died: 12 May 1985 (aged 91)
- Military career
- Branch: Schutzstaffel
- Rank: Sturmbannführer

Karl Emil Oskar Beier (29 November 1893 in Vápenná – 12 May 1985 in Fulda) was a German Nazi politician and SS-Sturmbannführer (Major) during the German occupation of Czechoslovakia (1938–1945). From 1940 to 1945, he was the mayor of Ostrava, Czechoslovakia.

Beier was installed as mayor in 1940 as a replacement for then-mayor Josef Hinner, who was deposed by the Nazis for being "too soft" on Czech officials.

As mayor, Beier initiated the annexation of 12 municipalities into Ostrava (Heřmanice, Hrabová, Hrušov, Kunčice, Kunčičky, Michálkovice, Muglinov, Nová Bělá, Radvanice, Slezská Ostrava, Stará Bělá, and Výškovice). He also established the mining museum and expanded road communications. Beier wrote the book Mährish Ostrau, which was published in Prague by the SS in 1942. After the liberation of Ostrava, he was briefly replaced by Josef Lampa.
