= Bayerlein =

Bayerlein is a surname. Notable people with the surname include:

- Bernhard H. Bayerlein (1949), German professor
- Fritz Bayerlein (1899–1970), German lieutenant general

== See also ==
- Bayer (surname)
- Beyer
- Baier
- Beier
