= Baier =

Baier is a surname of German origin with the meaning "person from Bavaria". Notable people with the surname include:

- Annette Baier, (1929–2012), New Zealand moral philosopher
- Annerose Baier (1946–2022), German ice dancer
- Benjamin Baier (born 1988), German footballer
- Bernhard Baier (1912–2003), German water polo player
- Bret Baier (born 1970), American reporter
- Christel Baier (born 1965), German computer scientist
- Daniel Baier (born 1984), German footballer
- Ernst Baier (1905–2001), German figure skater
- Fred Baier (born 1949), British furniture designer
- Fritz Baier (1923–2012), German politician
- Herwig Baier (born 1965), German neurobiologist
- Jo Baier (born 1949), German filmmaker
- Johann Jacob Baier (1677–1735), German doctor and paleontologist
- Johann Wilhelm Baier (1647–1697), German Lutheran theologian
- Kurt Baier (1917–2010), Austrian moral philosopher
- Leslie Joan Baier, American scientist
- Lothar Baier (1942–2004), German author
- Lowell E. Baier (born 1940), American attorney and environmental historian
- Lionel Baier (born 1975), Swiss film director
- Maik Baier (born 1989), German racing cyclist
- Paul Baier (born 1985), American hockey player
- Paulo Baier (born 1974), Brazilian footballer
- Richard Baier (born 1926), German journalist
- Rudolf Baier (1892–1945), German road racing cyclist
- Sherri Baier, Canadian figure skater
- Sibylle Baier (born 1955), German folk singer
- Steve Baier, American politician
- Viktor Baier (born 2005), Czech footballer

== See also ==
- Bajer (disambiguation)
- Bayer (surname)
- Beyer, a surname
