= Macromantis ovalifolia =

Scientific classification
- Kingdom: Animalia
- Phylum: Arthropoda
- Clade: Pancrustacea
- Class: Insecta
- Order: Mantodea
- Family: Photinaidae
- Genus: Macromantis
- Species: M. ovalifolia

Binomial name
- Macromantis ovalifolia Stoll, 1813

Species of praying mantis

Macromantis ovalifolia is the species of mantis in the subfamily Macromantinae. At 10 cm in length, it is one of the largest species of praying mantis.
