= Bayer (disambiguation) =

Bayer is a German multinational pharmaceutical and biotechnology company.

Bayer may refer to:

- a native or inhabitant of the Free State of Bavaria (Freistaat Bayern)
- Bayer (crater), a lunar crater
- Bayer filter, a color filter mosaic also known as a Bayer pattern or Bayer mask, used in digital camera image sensors
- Bayer designation for star names
- KFC Uerdingen 05, formerly known as FC Bayer 05 Uerdingen, a German football club
- Bayer Leverkusen, a German sports and football club
- Bayer 04 Leverkusen, a German woman's handball club
- Bayer Esporte Clube, a Brazilian football club
- Baeyer's reagent, a mild oxidation reagent used in organic chemistry
- Bayer (surname), list of people with this name

== See also ==
- Beyer, a surname
- Buyer
