= Welzl =

Welzl is a surname. Notable people with the surname include:

- Emo Welzl (born 1958), Austrian-Swiss computer scientist
- Jan Eskymo Welzl (1868–1948), Moravian explorer
- Kurt Welzl (born 1954), Austrian footballer
