= Beyer =

See also Bayer (surname) and buyer.

Beyer is mostly a German family name, occurring most commonly in German-speaking countries. It can be either habitational (derived from Bayer, which is the male German language demonym for Bavaria) or occupational (derived from the archaic German verb beiern, "to ring (a bell)", thus referring to individuals tasked with ringing church bells). Variants of the surname include Beier, Bayer and Baier.

Most inventions and institutions listed here with the name Beyer were named after an inventor or founder or supporter with the name Beyer.

== People named Beyer ==
- Absalon Pederssøn Beyer (died 1575), Norwegian clergyman
- Adam Beyer (born 1976), Swedish techno producer and DJ
- Albert Beyer (1859–1929), United States Navy coxswain
- Alexander Beyer (born 1973), German actor
- Andrew Beyer (born 1943), American designer of Beyer Speed Figure
- Barbara Petzold-Beyer (born Petzold, 1955), East German cross-country skier
- Bero Beyer, Dutch film producer
- Beyers Naudé (1915–2004), South African theologian and anti-apartheid activist
- Brad Beyer (born 1973), American actor
- Charles Beyer (1813–1876), British locomotive engineer
- Clara Beyers (1880–1950), actress
- Colin Beyer (1938–2015), New Zealand lawyer and businessman
- Dick Beyer (1930–2019), American wrestler known as The Destroyer or Doctor X
- Don Beyer (born 1950), American politician and businessman from Virginia
- Emil Beyer (Nebraska politician) (1929–2014), American politician from Nebraska
- Eugen Beyer (1882–1940), 19th-century German army officer
- Ferdinand Beyer (1803–1863), German composer
- Frank Beyer (1932–2006), German film director
- Franz Beyer, several people
- Friedrich Bayer (born Friedrich Beyer, 1825–1880), German businessman and chemist, founder of Bayer AG
- Georgina Beyer (1957–2023), world's first openly transsexual Member of Parliament
- Grace Beyer (born c. 2001), American basketball player
- H. Otley Beyer (1883–1966), American anthropologist
- Helga Beyer (1920–1941), German resistance fighter
- Jan Beyer Schmidt-Sørensen (born 1958), Danish economist and Director of Business Development at Aarhus Municipality
- John H. Beyer (1933–2026), American architect
- Jinny Beyer (born 1941), American quilt designer and quilter
- Kirsten Beyer, American science fiction writer
- Kyle Beyer, American football coach
- Lisa Beyer, United States journalist
- Mark Beyer (artist) (born 1950), comic artist
- Markus Beyer (1971–2018), German boxer
- Olaf Beyer (born 1957), Olympic champion
- Peter Beyer (professor) (born 1952), German inventor of Golden Rice
- Peter Beyer (politician) (born 1970), German politician
- Ralph Beyer (1921–2008), German letter-cutter and sculptor
- Richard Beyer (1925–2012), American sculptor
- Robert D. Beyer, American investor and executive
- Robert T. Beyer (1920–2008), American physicist
- Susanne Beyer (journalist) (born 1969), German journalist and author
- Tanya Beyer, American model and actress
- Troy Beyer (born 1964), American film director, screenwriter and actress
- Udo Beyer (born 1955), East German track and field athlete
- Uwe Beyer (1945–1993), Olympic contestant
- William Gray Beyer, American science fiction and mystery writer

== Companies and institutions named Beyer ==
- Beyerdynamic, German audio equipment manufacturer
- The Doebner-Miller reaction, in organic chemistry
- Garratt, also type of steam locomotive that is articulated in three parts
- Beyer, Peacock & Company, locomotive manufacturer in England
- The Beyer Speed Figure, for rating the performance of Thoroughbred racehorses
- The Beyer Stadium in Illinois, demolished in the early 1990s
- The Fred C. Beyer High School in Modesto, California.
- The Beyer Professor of Applied Mathematics, position at the University of Manchester
