= František Sláma =

František Sláma may refer to:

- František Sláma (musician) (1923–2004), Czech chamber music performer
- František Sláma (politician) (1850–1917), Czech writer, traveller, lawyer and politician
