= Microphotina =

Scientific classification
- Kingdom: Animalia
- Phylum: Arthropoda
- Clade: Pancrustacea
- Class: Insecta
- Order: Mantodea
- Family: Photinaidae
- Genus: Microphotina; Beier, 1935

Species
- Microphotina cristalino; Microphotina panguanensis; Microphotina viridescens; Microphotina viridula; Microphotina vitripennis

Genus of praying mantises

Microphotina is a genus of mantises in the family Photinaidae.

== See also ==
- List of mantis genera and species
