= Microphotina vitripennis =

Scientific classification
- Kingdom: Animalia
- Phylum: Arthropoda
- Clade: Pancrustacea
- Class: Insecta
- Order: Mantodea
- Family: Photinaidae
- Genus: Microphotina
- Species: M. vitripennis

Binomial name
- Microphotina vitripennis Saussure, 1872

Genus of praying mantises

Microphotina vitripennis is a species of mantis in the family Photinaidae.

== See also ==
- List of mantis genera and species
