= Antošovice =

Area of Ostrava, Czech Republic

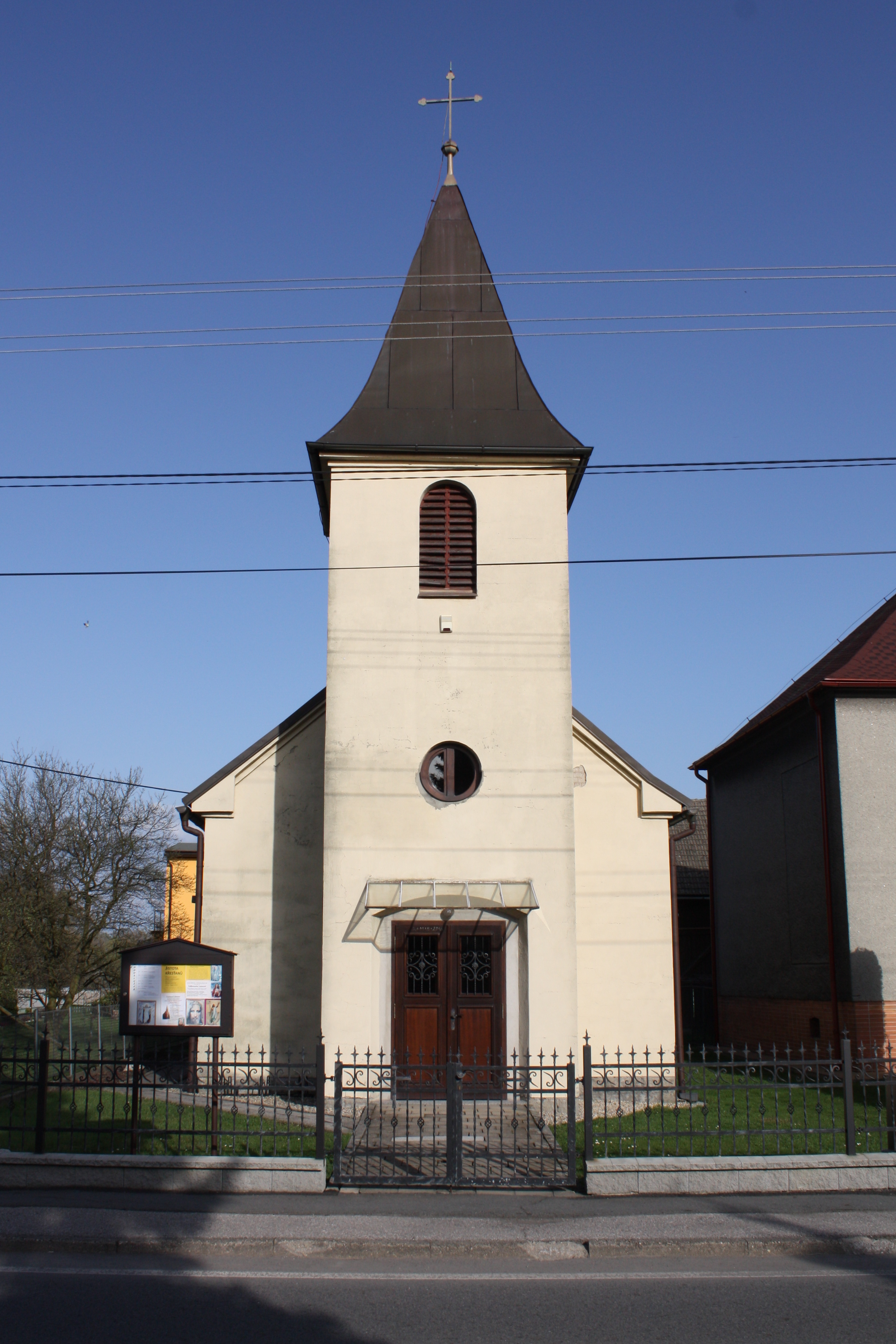
Chapel of Saint Peter and Paul in Antošovice

Antošovice is a part of the Slezská Ostrava city borough in Ostrava, Czech Republic. It lies in the northernmost part of the city, on the left bank of the Oder River, near the border with Poland. Originally a village, it was incorporated into Ostrava in 1976. It is named after P. Jan Jantosch (1648–1727), who served as the manager of Šilheřovice manor.
