= Koblov =

City part of Ostrava, Czech Republic

Coordinates: 49°52′25″N 18°17′02″E

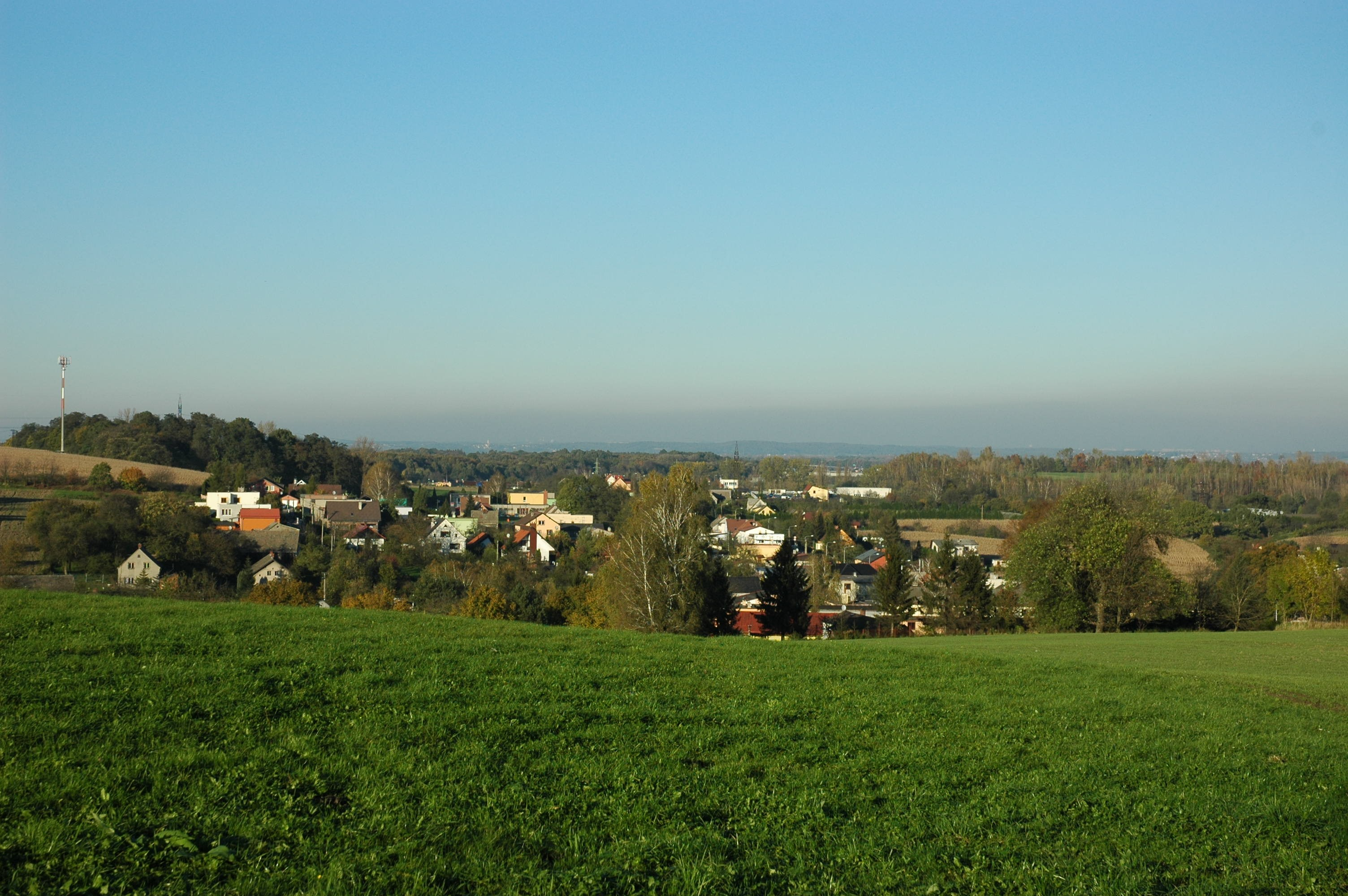
Panoramic view of Koblov

Koblov is a part of the Slezská Ostrava city borough in Ostrava, Czech Republic. It lies in the northern part of the city, on the left bank of the Oder River. It was incorporated into Ostrava in 1976. The name is derived from the Czech word kobyla, meaning mare, as horses were bred in that area.

== Gallery ==
Children herding geese and cows, Koblov in the background (1938)

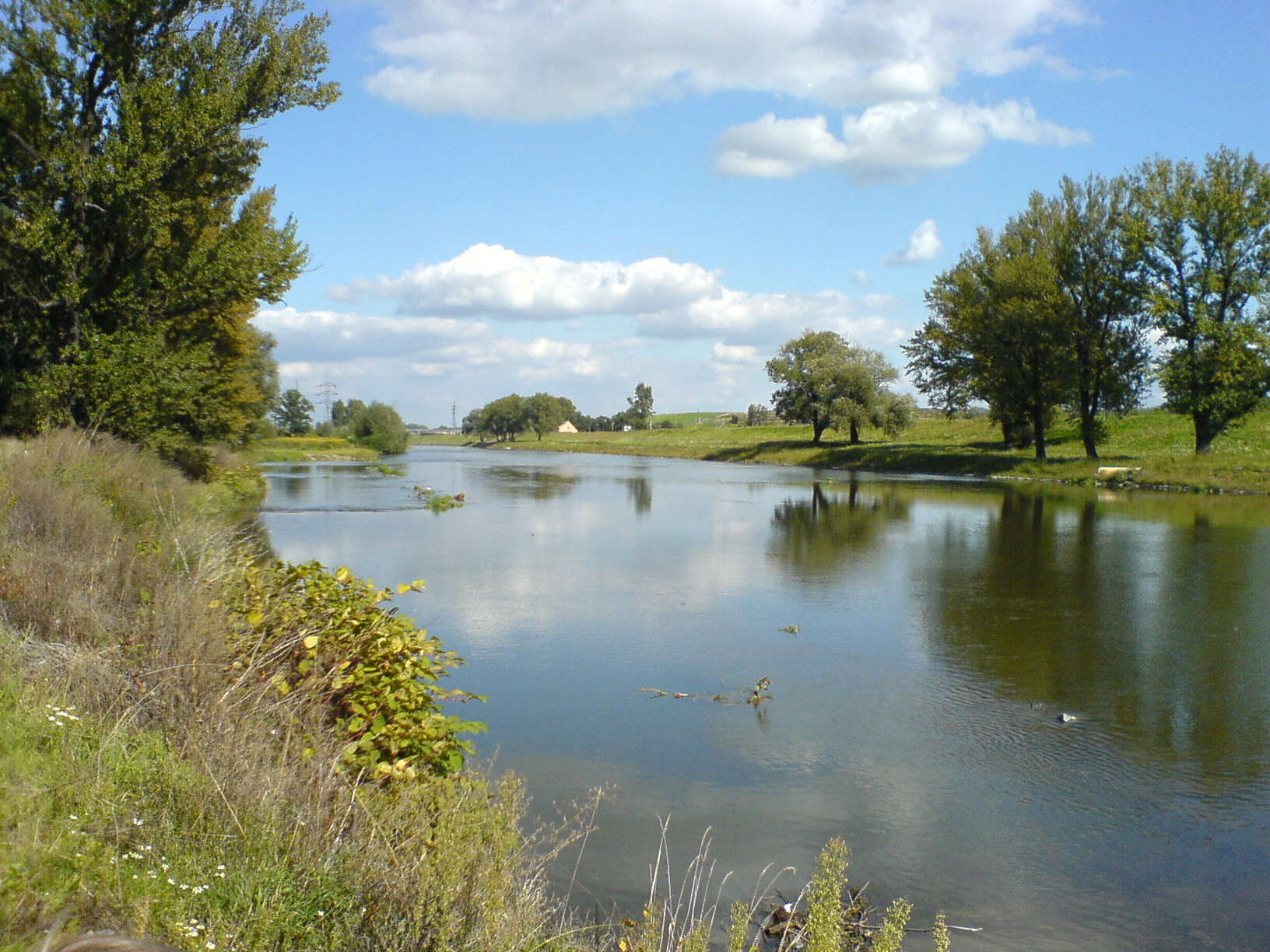
The Oder at Koblov (2006)

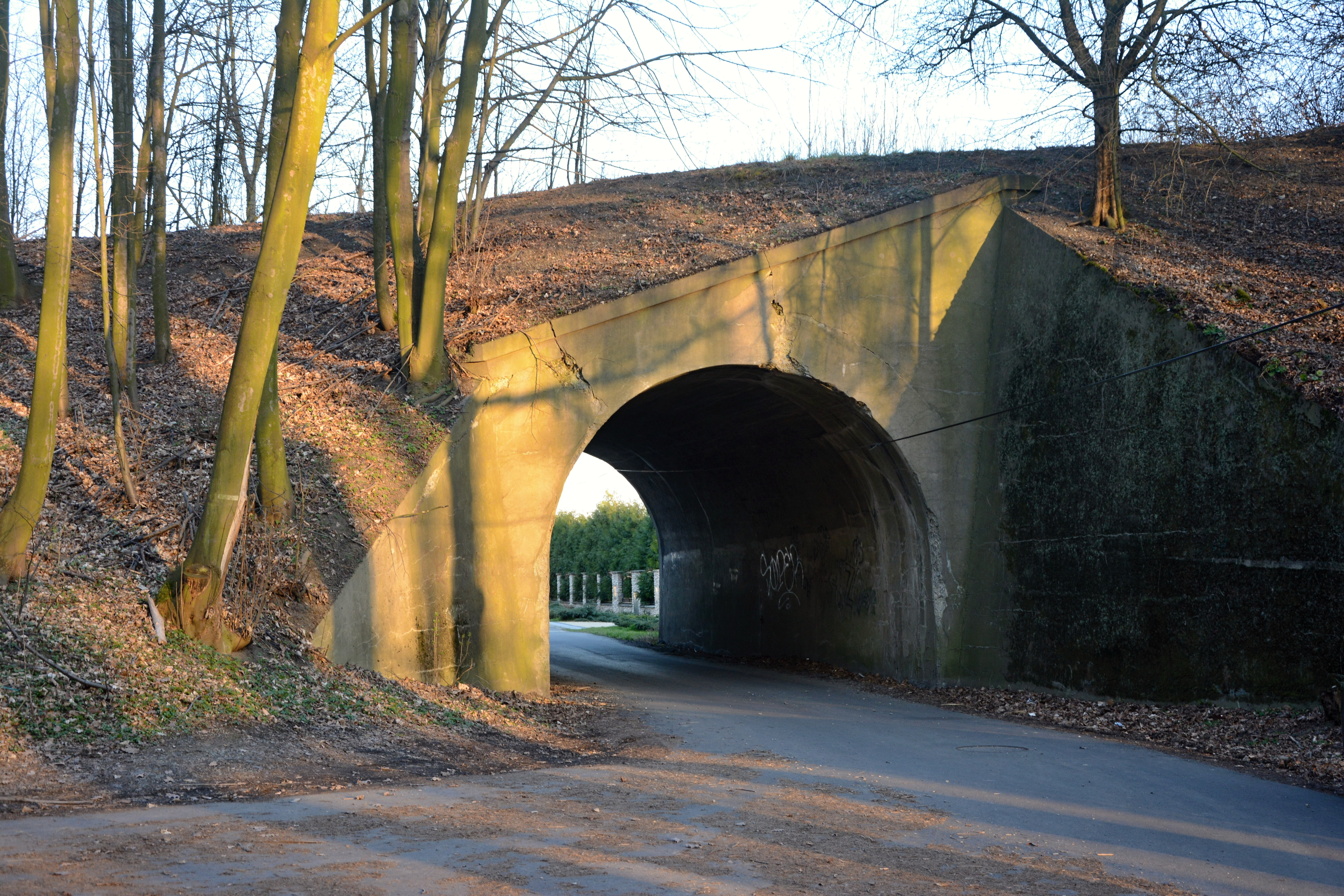
Viaduct (2020)
