= Edvard Valenta =

Czech poet, publicist and writer

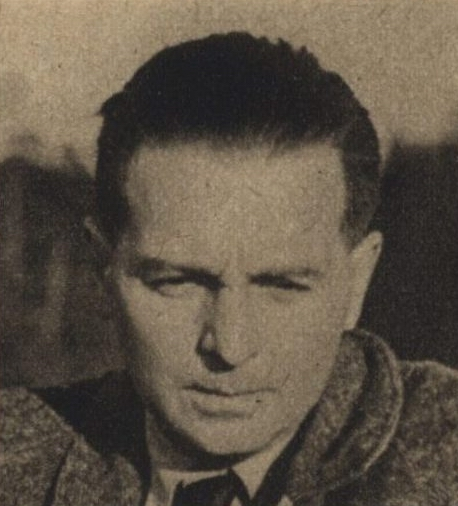
- Born: 22 January 1901; Prostějov
- Died: 21 August 1978 (aged 77); Prague
- Resting place: Municipal cemetery in Prostějov
- Occupation(s): Journalist and writer

Edvard Valenta (22 January 1901 in Prostějov – 21 August 1978 in Prague) was a Czech journalist and writer.

== Life ==
Valenta was born into the family of a medical doctor. After finishing secondary school in 1918 he started to study at a technical university, but soon left to work as a journalist. In 1920 Valenta joined the Brno office of the newspaper Lidové noviny. He stayed there until February 1948 when he was purged by the new Communist regime. In December 1948 Valenta was taken into custody, and in July 1949 he was given a short sentence. Although imprisoned for a relatively short time, his health deteriorated. Valenta was allowed to publish again during a period of cultural liberalisation.

Among his most important works are recordings of the adventures of Jan Welzl (together with colleague Bedřich Golombek), a biography of the African explorer Emil Holub, and the psychological novel Jdi za zeleným světlem. The novel depicts the life of an intellectual who, affected by tragic events, decides to start a new life in a small, quiet village. The cruelty of World War II occupation is described and at the end the main character of the novel is shot by retreating German soldiers.

== Selected works ==
- Valenta had recorded stories of Jan Welzl and they were published in four books during the 1930s.
- Lidé, které jsem potkal cestou, 1939.
- Druhé housle, 1943. Biography of Emil Holub.
- Kouty srdce a světa, 1946.
- Kvas, 1947.
- Světem pro nic za nic, 1947. Book of travels in the Americas.
- Poprvé a naposledy, 1948.
- Jdi za zeleným světlem, 1956. A psychological portrait of an intellectual during occupation.
- Nejkrásnější země, 1958.
- Trám, 1963.
- Dlouhán v okně, 1965.
- Život samé psaní, 1970.
- Žil jsem s miliardářem, 1979. Remembrance of industrialist Jan Antonín Baťa.
- Žít ještě jednou, 1983. A detective novel.
