= Macromantis =

Scientific classification
- Kingdom: Animalia
- Phylum: Arthropoda
- Clade: Pancrustacea
- Class: Insecta
- Order: Mantodea
- Family: Photinaidae
- Genus: Macromantis; Saussure, 1871

Genus of mantises

Macromantis is a genus of mantises belonging to the family Photinaidae.

The species of this genus are found in Central and South America.

Species:

- Macromantis hyalina De Geer, 1773
- Macromantis nicaraguae Saussure & Zehntner, 1894
- Macromantis ovalifolia Stoll, 1813
- Macromantis saussurei Roy, 2002
