= Heřmanice (Ostrava) =

Coordinates: 49°51′37″N 18°19′52″E

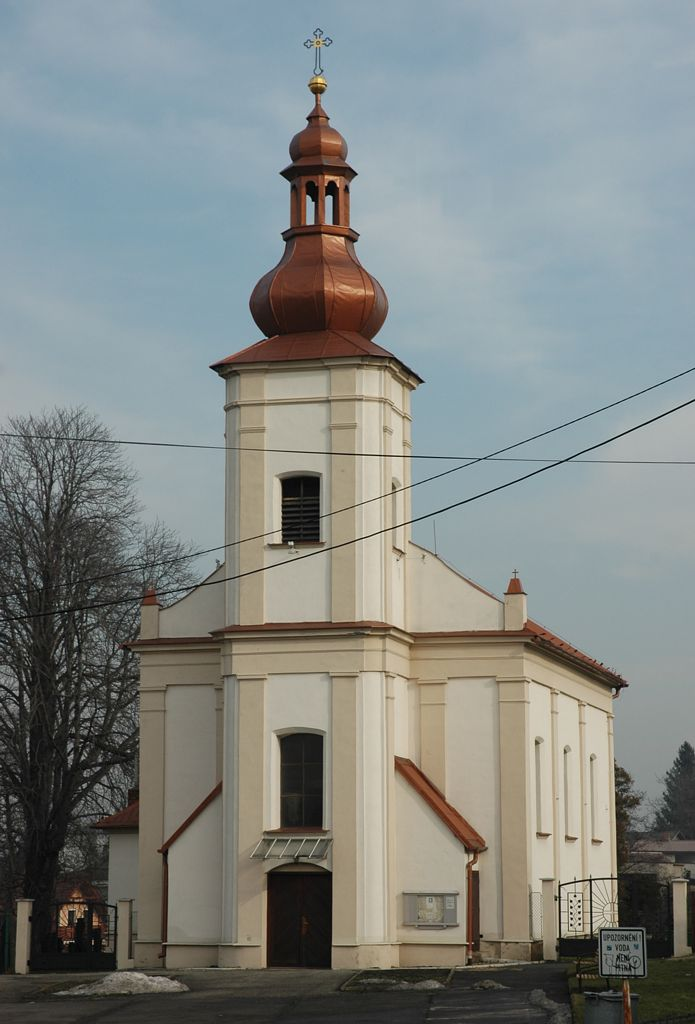
Saint Mark Church

Heřmanice (Polish: Herzmanice or Hermanice, German: Herzmanitz) is a part of the city of Ostrava, Moravian-Silesian Region in the Czech Republic. Administratively it is a part of the district of Slezská Ostrava. It lies in the historical region of Těšín Silesia

== History ==
The settlement was first mentioned in a Latin document of Diocese of Wrocław called Liber fundationis episcopatus Vratislaviensis from around 1305 as item in Hermanni villa. It meant that the village was in the process of location (the size of land to pay tithe from was not yet precised). The creation of the village was a part of a larger settlement campaign taking place in the late 13th century on the territory of what will be later known as Upper Silesia.

Politically the village belonged initially to the Duchy of Teschen, formed in 1290 in the process of feudal fragmentation of Poland and was ruled by a local branch of Piast dynasty. In 1327, the duchy became a fee of Kingdom of Bohemia, which after 1526 became part of the Habsburg monarchy.

The village became a seat of a Catholic parish, mentioned in the register of Peter's Pence payment from 1447 among 50 parishes of Teschen deaconry as Hermansdorff.

After the heavy industrialization of Ostrava, the majority of local people were employed in nearby factories. Heřmanice was formerly an independent municipality; it was incorporated into Ostrava by Emil Beier, the Nazi mayor, in 1941.

According to the Austrian census of 1910 the town had 3,727 inhabitants, 3,608 of whom had permanent residence there; 2,800 (77.6%) were Czech-speaking and 776 (21.5%) were Polish-speaking. The most populous religious groups were Roman Catholics with 3,600 (96.6%) and Protestants with 105 (2.8%).

In 1959, a labour camp was built there, now it is a prison.
