= Bedřich Golombek =

Czech journalist and writer (1901–1961)

Bedřich Golombek (5 February 1901 – 31 March 1961) was a Czech journalist and writer.

== Life ==
Golombek was born on 5 February 1901 in Hrušov, Austria-Hungary (today part of Ostrava, Czech Republic). He was born into the family of a coal miner. He studied at a secondary school in Ostrava, and immediately afterwards (in 1919) began work for the newspaper Lidové noviny, in the office in Brno. Golombek started as a reporter, since 1930 he was editor-in-chief of the Sunday edition, since 1933 editor-in-chief of the afternoon edition. After World War II he became the editor-in-chief at the main office of Lidové noviny in Prague but after Victorious February of 1948 (communist coup d'état) he was forced to leave. Later, he worked as a clerk in a factory in Brno.

== Selected works ==
- Journalistic activity is the most valued and extensive legacy of Golombek.
- Together with Edvard Valenta Golombek recorded stories of Jan Welzl, a Czech traveller and Eskimo chief. The stories were serialized in the newspaper and later, during the 1930s, published in four books.
- Lidé na povrchu, 1941. A novel about Ostrava region.
- Dům o dvou poschodích, 1942. A novel about Ostrava region.
- Dnes a zítra. K padesátce Lidových novin, 1944. A recollection of the history of the newspaper.
- Co nebude v dějepise, 1945. Description of life during occupation.
- Rudolf Těsnohlídek, 1946. Biography of writer and journalist Rudolf Těsnohlídek.
- Perleťová květina, 1959. Collection of short stories.
- Čtení o veletrhu, posthumously in 1961. Depiction of the atmosphere of fair trades in Brno.
