= Karel Fiala =

Czech actor (1925–2020)

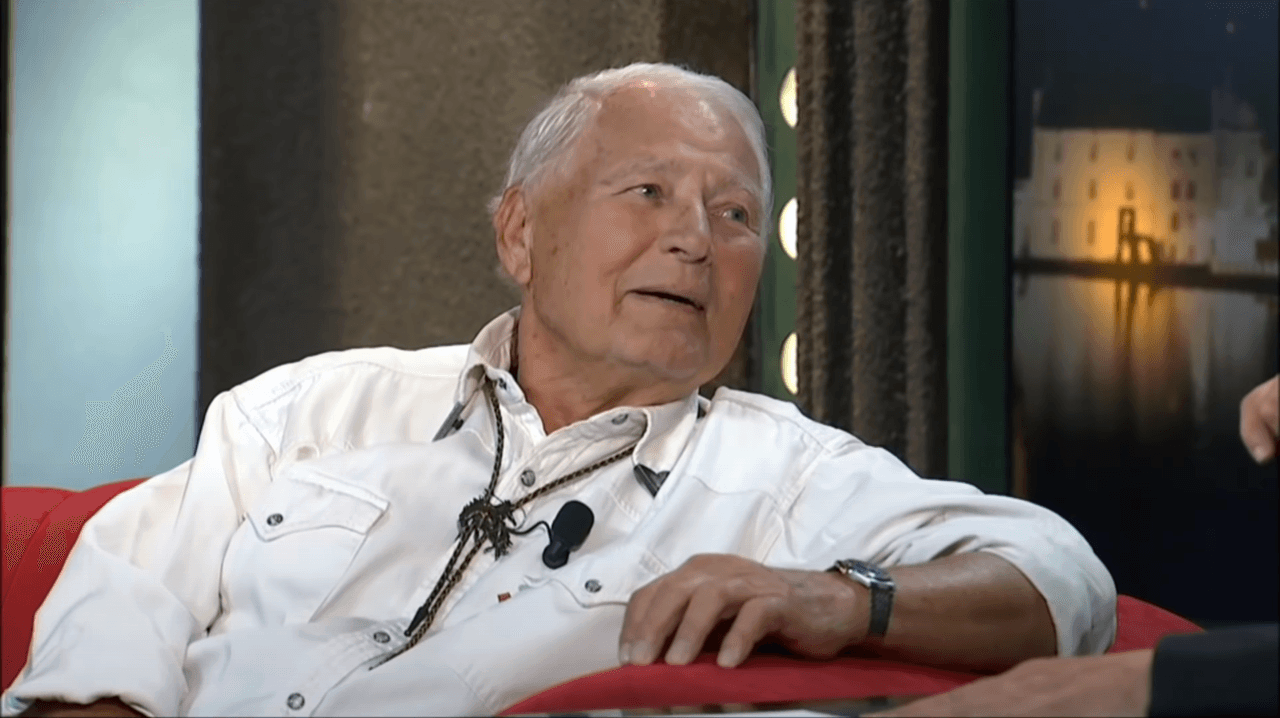
- Show Jana Krause, FTV Prima 2014
- Born: 3 August 1925; Hrušov, Czechoslovakia
- Died: 3 October 2020 (aged 95); Prague, Czech Republic
- Occupations: Actor, opera singer

Karel Fiala (3 August 1925 – 3 October 2020) was a Czech operatic tenor and film actor. He was known for his work in operettas and musicals, but received worldwide attention for his portrayal of Mozart's Don Giovanni in the film Amadeus.

== Biography ==
Fiala was born on 3 August 1925 in Hrušov (Ostrava), Czechoslovakia, and initially worked as a chimney sweeper before entering the Prague Conservatory in 1947. After earning his degree in 1952 he pursued further studies at the Academy of Performing Arts in Prague for three years, graduating in 1955.

While still a student, Fiala began performing in operas at the National Theatre in Prague in 1949. He was committed to that theatre through 1954 after which he joined the roster of principal artists at the Hudební divadlo Karlín where he performed roles for several decades. He was particularly successful in portraying parts in operettas and musicals, including such roles as Count Danilo in Lehar's The Merry Widow, Freddy in My Fair Lady, and Jim Kenyon in Rose-Marie.

Fiala is chiefly remembered for his numerous appearances in films of Czech operas, operettas, and musicals. His first film was in 1956 where he portrayed the title role in Dalibor, a movie version of Smetana's opera of the same name. A major success for him was the title part in the 1964 musical film Lemonade Joe. He notably appeared as Mozart's Don Giovanni in the 1984 Academy Award winning film Amadeus. Fiala also appeared as a non-singing actor in a handful of Czech films during his career, mostly in smaller roles. His last film was Tichý společník in 1989.

In 1988 Fiala was awarded the Medal of Merit by the government of Czechoslovakia. In 2013, he was awarded the Czech Thalia Prize for achievements in acting. He was married three times and had four sons.

On 3 October 2020, Fiala died after a long illness in Vršovice, Prague, aged 95.

== Politics ==
Fiala was an active supporter of the Communist Party of Czechoslovakia until 1968 when he resigned his membership in protest at the Warsaw Pact invasion of Czechoslovakia.
