= Hrušov (Ostrava) =

Coordinates: 49°51′37″N 18°18′14″E

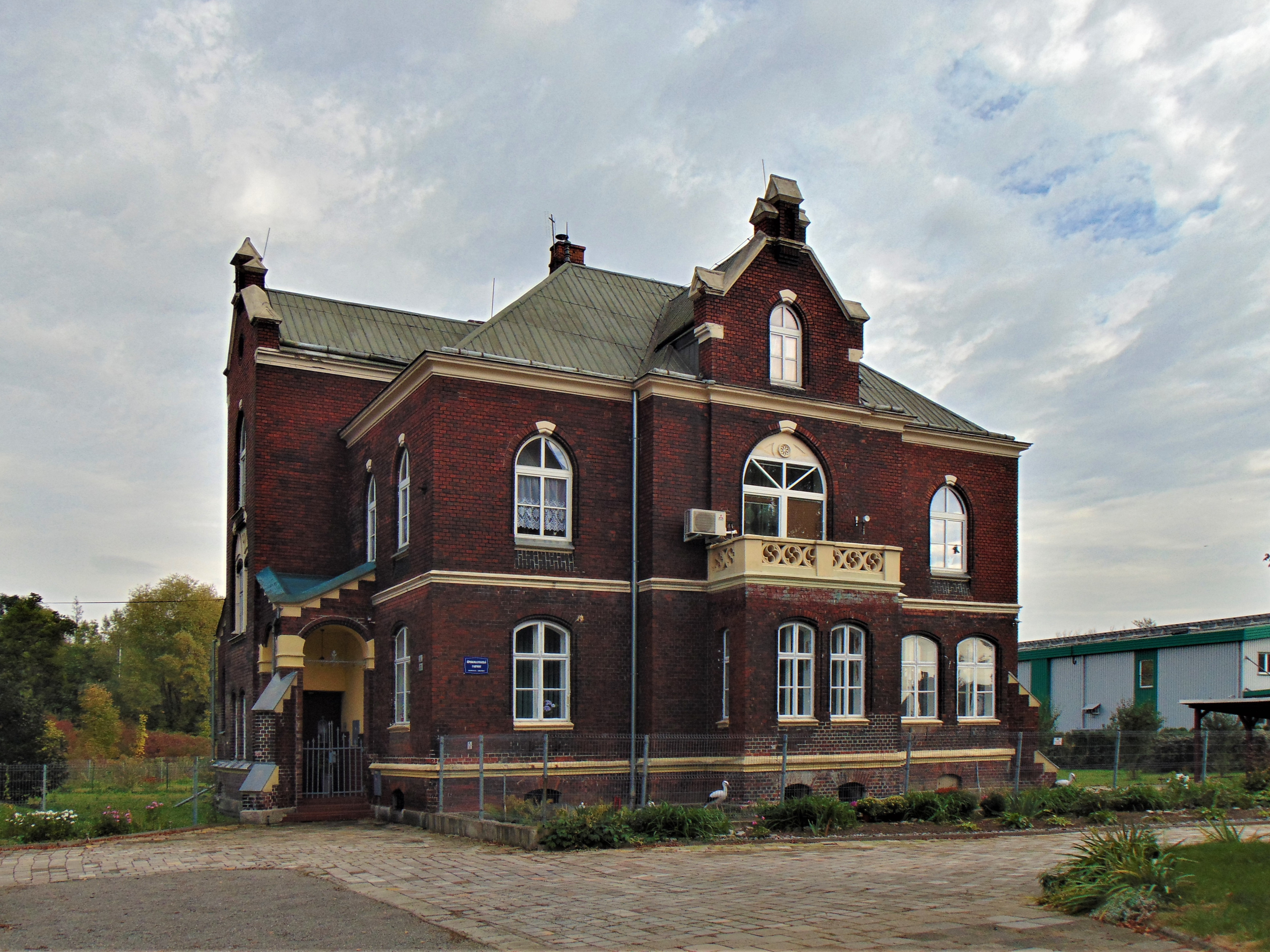
The rectory of the Catholic parish of St. Francis and St. Victor

Hrušov (Polish: Gruszów or Hruszów, German: Hruschau) is a part of the city of Ostrava, Moravian-Silesian Region in the Czech Republic. Hrušov is historically a market town, now administratively a part of the district of Slezská Ostrava.

== History ==
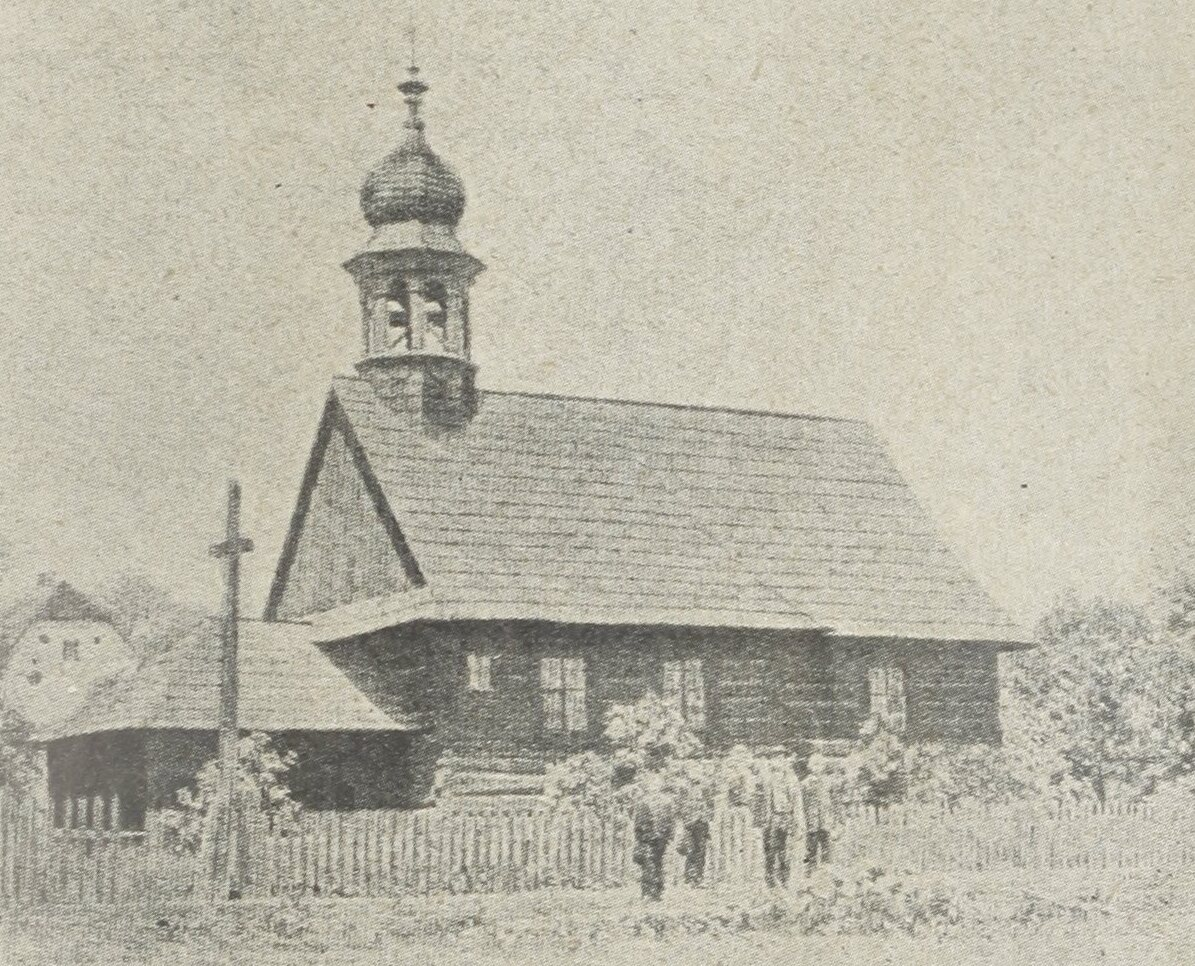
The former church before destruction, before 1932

It lies in the historical region of Těšín Silesia and was first mentioned in a border agreement between Władysław Opolski, the duke of Opole and Racibórz and Ottokar II of Bohemia, in 1256 as Grusov. It was again mentioned in a Latin document of Diocese of Wrocław called Liber fundationis episcopatus Vratislaviensis from around 1305 as Item in Grussow.

It witnessed heavy industrialization in the 19th century, coal was mined there, several factories were built, influx of migrant workers occurred.

Hrušov gained market town rights in 1908. Formerly an independent municipality, it was incorporated into the city in 1941 by the Nazi mayor, Emil Beier.

According to the Austrian census of 1910 the market town had 7,922 inhabitants, 7,508 of whom had permanent residence there. Census asked people for their native language, 3,585 (47.7%) were German-speaking, 2,429 (32.4%) were Polish-speaking and 1,487 (19.8%) were Czech-speaking. Jews were not allowed to declare Yiddish, most of them thus declared German as their native language. Most populous religious groups were Roman Catholics with 7,502 (94.7%) followed by the Jews with 197 (2.5%) and Protestants with 182 (2.3%).

== People ==
- Vlastimil Brodský, actor
- Karel Fiala, operatic tenor and film actor
- Bedřich Golombek, journalist
