= Chotěboř =

- Town
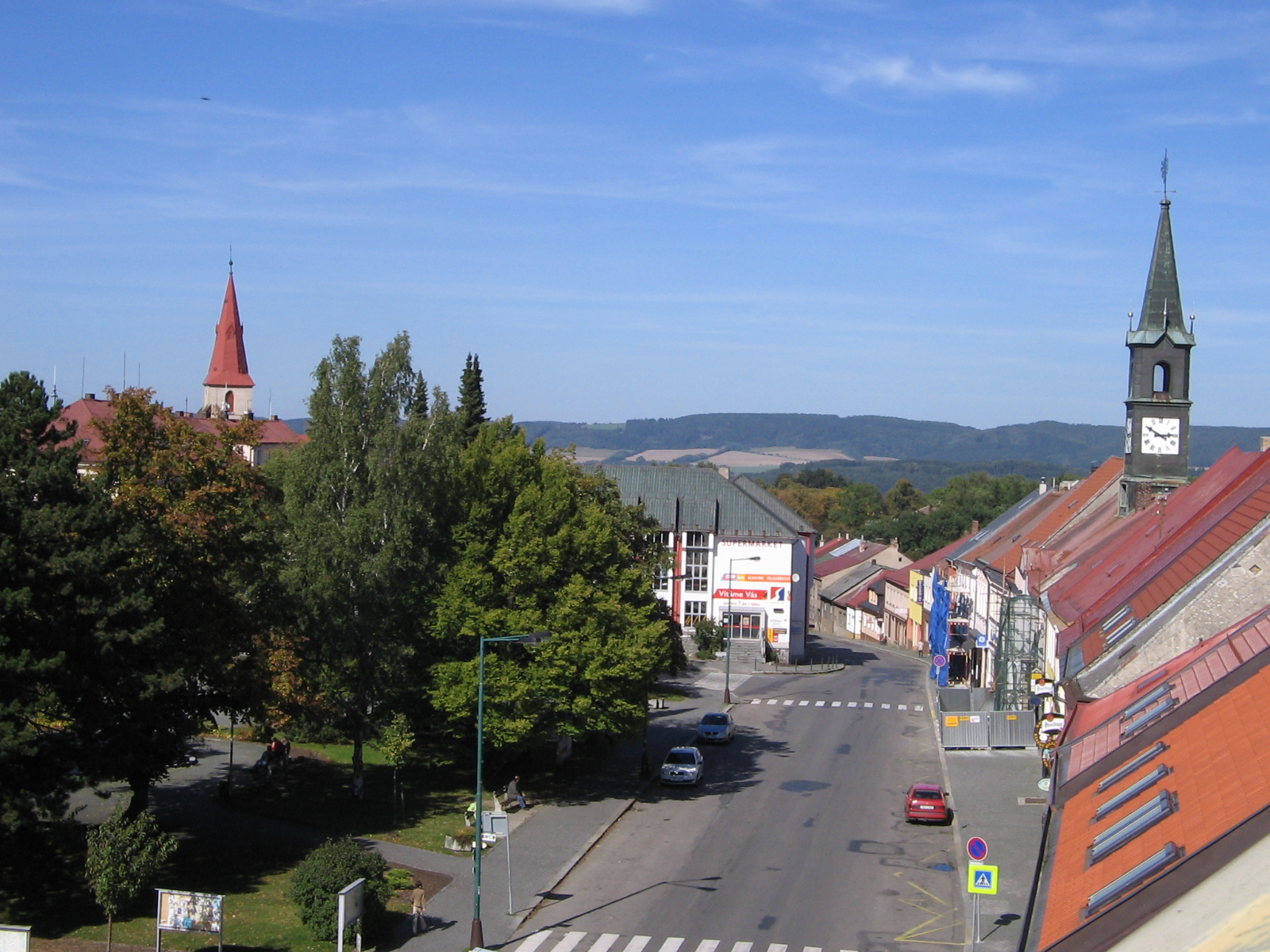
- The square Náměstí T. G. Masaryka

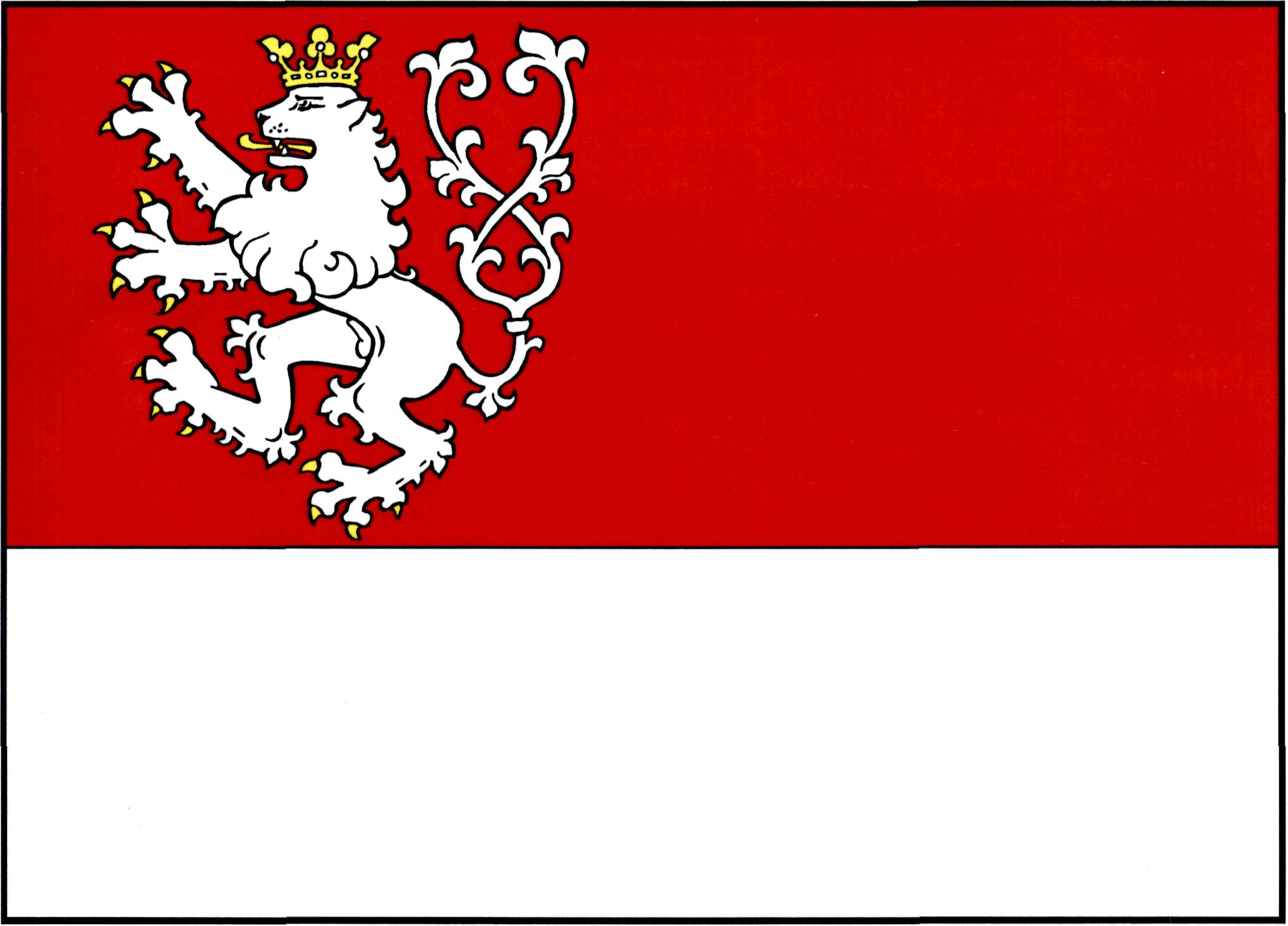
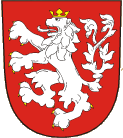
- Flag Coat of arms

- Location in the Czech Republic
- Coordinates: 49°43′15″N 15°40′13″E
- Country: Czech Republic
- Region: Vysočina
- District: Havlíčkův Brod
- First mentioned: 1265

Government
  - Mayor: Ondřej Kozub

Area
  - Total: 54.06 km^{2} (20.87 sq mi)
- Elevation: 515 m (1,690 ft)

Population (2026-01-01)
  - Total: 9,076
  - Density: 167.9/km^{2} (434.8/sq mi)
- Time zone: UTC+1 (CET)
  - Summer (DST): UTC+2 (CEST)
- Postal code: 583 01
- Website: www.chotebor.cz

Chotěboř (Czech pronunciation: [ˈxocɛbor̝̊]; German: Chotieborsch) is a town in Havlíčkův Brod District in the Vysočina Region of the Czech Republic. It has about 9,100 inhabitants. The town is located near the Doubrava River in the Upper Sázava Hills.

Chotěboř became a town in 1331. The historic town centre is well preserved and is protected as an urban monument zone. The main landmark of the town is the Chotěboř Castle.

== Administrative division ==
Chotěboř consists of nine municipal parts (in brackets population according to the 2021 census):

- Chotěboř (7,540)
- Bílek (266)
- Dobkov (113)
- Klouzovy (69)
- Počátky (136)
- Příjemky (165)
- Rankov (139)
- Střížov (124)
- Svinný (235)

== Etymology ==
The name is derived from the personal name Chotěbor. There was the Chotěbor's manor, owned probably by the noble Chotěbor of Vchynice.

== Geography ==
Chotěboř is located about 14 kilometres (9 mi) northeast of Havlíčkův Brod and 34 km (21 mi) north of Jihlava. It lies in the Upper Sázava Hills. The highest point is the hill Fiedlerův kopec at 615 m (2,018 ft) above sea level. The Doubrava River flows along the eastern municipal border. There are several fishponds on the outskirts of the town.

== History ==
The first written mention of Chotěboř is from 1265. Because of the silver mines in the vicinity, King John of Bohemia bought the village. In 1331, he promoted it to a town. It was a royal town until the end of the 15th century, when it was acquired by the Trčka of Lípa family.

During the 17th and 18th centuries, the owners often changed. Vilém Leopold Kinsky built a castle there in 1701–1702. From 1836 to 1948, the castle was owned by the Dobřenský of Dobřenice family. The castle was returned to their ownership in 1992.

== Demographics ==
Historical population

Year	Pop.	±%
1869	6,496	—
1880	6,675	+2.8%
1890	6,254	−6.3%
1900	6,595	+5.5%
1910	7,020	+6.4%

Year	Pop.	±%
1921	7,154	+1.9%
1930	6,825	−4.6%
1950	6,560	−3.9%
1961	7,736	+17.9%
1970	8,111	+4.8%

Year	Pop.	±%
1980	9,407	+16.0%
1991	9,352	−0.6%
2001	9,870	+5.5%
2011	9,345	−5.3%
2021	8,787	−6.0%

Source: Censuses

== Economy ==
The largest employer based in the town is the company GCE, a manufacturer of welding supplies. It employs more than 500 people.

== Transport ==
There are no major roads passing through Chotěboř, but the town is located at the intersection of several second-class roads.

Chotěboř is located on the railway line Pardubice–Havlíčkův Brod.

== Sights ==
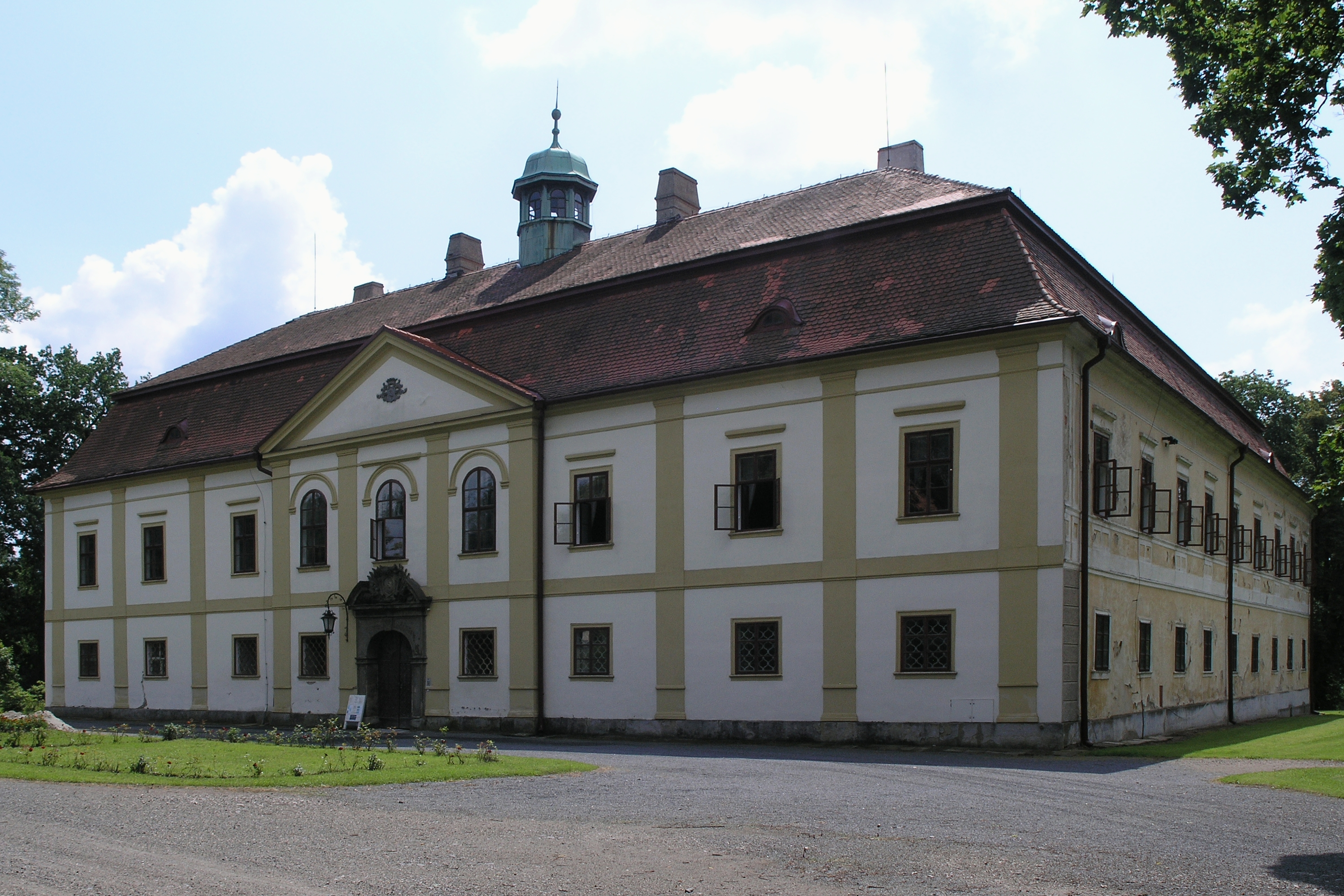
Chotěboř Castle

Chotěboř is known for the Chotěboř Castle. It is a Baroque building with Italian architecture elements. It contains an exposition of the town museum. The castle complex includes Chapel of the Holy Trinity and English style park.

The town square is lined by Neoclassical houses. They were built by reconstruction of the houses destroyed by fire in 1832 and the arcades were walled up. A landmark of the square is the former town hall with a typical clock tower.

The Church of Saint James the Great was built on the site of a Romanesque chapel from the 12th century, which was older than the town. The church was rebuilt many times after frequent fires. Its current form is after the Neo-Gothic reconstruction in 1894–1895.

== Notable people ==
- František Sláma (1850–1917), writer and politician
- Ignát Herrmann (1854–1935), novelist, satirist and editor
- Edvín Bayer (1862–1927), botanist
- Fritz Richard (1869–1933), Austrian actor and theatre director
- Bohuslav Šťastný (born 1949), ice hockey player
- Tomáš Zohorna (born 1988), ice hockey player
- Hynek Zohorna (born 1990), ice hockey player
- Gabriela Kratochvílová (born 1990), model, beauty pageant titleholder
- Matěj Vydra (born 1992), footballer

== Twin towns – sister cities ==
Chotěboř is twinned with:

- Tiachiv, Ukraine
- Tiszafüred, Hungary
