= Michálkovice =

Coordinates: 49°50′33″N 18°20′35″E

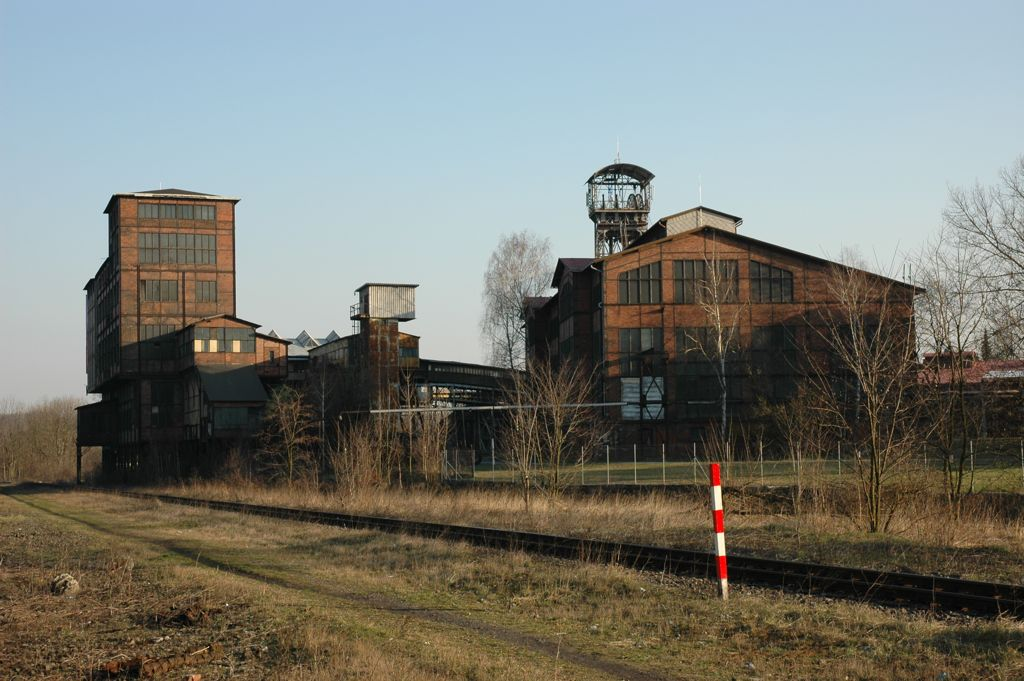
Michal Coal Mine

Michálkovice (Polish: Michałkowice, German: Michalkowitz) is an administrative district of the city of Ostrava, Moravian-Silesian Region in the Czech Republic.

It lies in the historical region of Cieszyn Silesia and was first mentioned in a written document in 1440. It witnessed heavy industrialization in the second half of the 19th century and several coal mines were dug here, most important was Michal Coal Mine.

In 1907 Michálkovice gained a market town rights. Formerly an independent municipality, in 1941 it became a part of Ostrava.

According to the Austrian census of 1910 the market town had 6,818 inhabitants, 6,794 of whom had permanent residence there. Census asked people for their native language, 4,147 (61%) were Czech-speaking and 2,481 (36.5%) were Polish-speaking. Most populous religious groups were Roman Catholics with 6,560 (96.2%), Protestants with 142 (2%) and the Jews with 108 (1.6%).

The most important landmark in Michálkovice is inactive Michal Coal Mine which is a National Cultural Landmark.
