= Jan Eskymo Welzl =

Czech arctic explorer and writer (1868–1948)

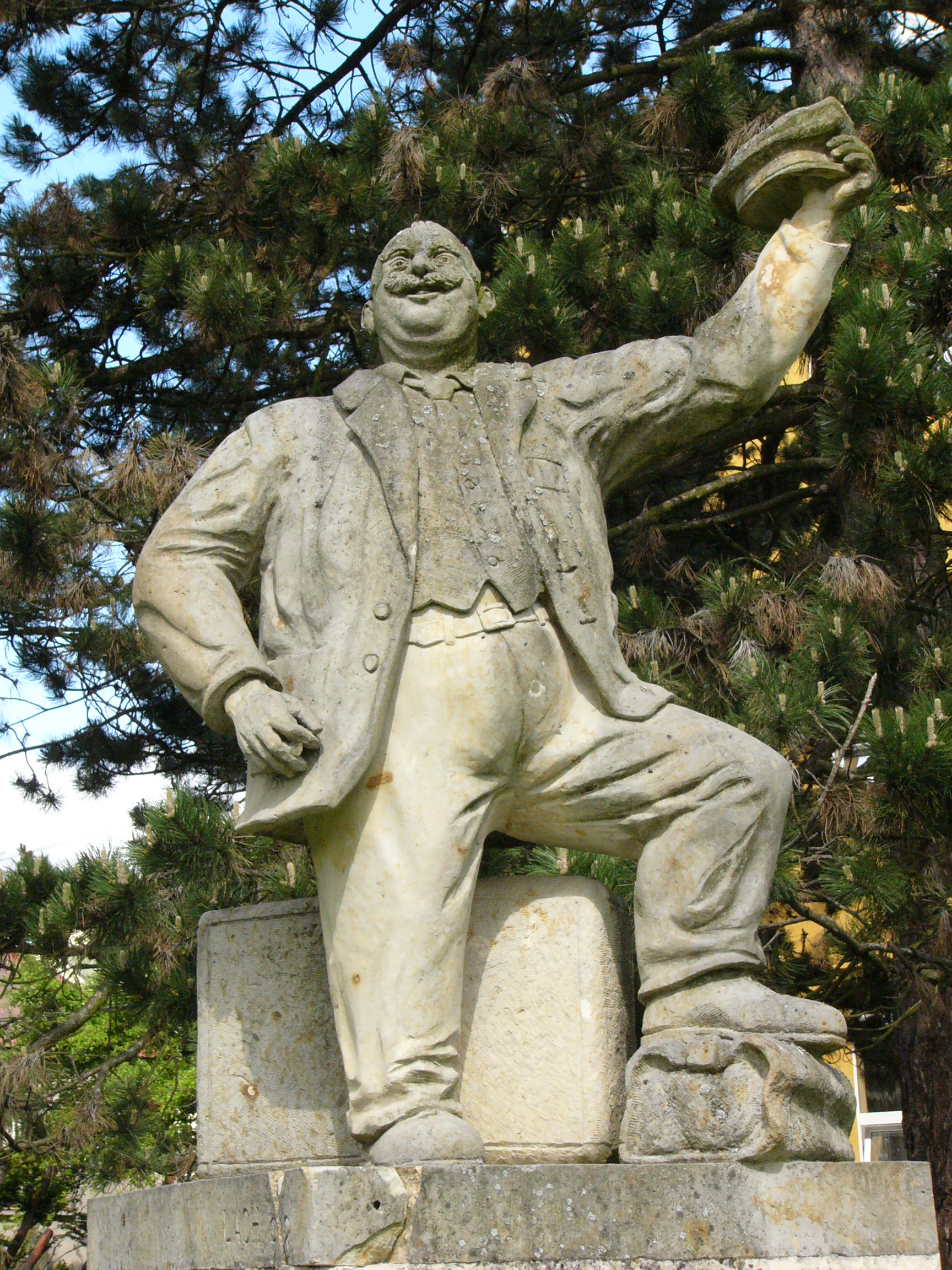
A statue of Welzl by Stanislav Lach (1998) in Welzl's hometown of Zábřeh

Jan Welzl (15 August 1868 – 19 September 1948) was a Czech traveller, adventurer, gold-digger, Eskimo chief and Chief Justice on New Siberia island, and later a story-teller and writer. He is known under the pseudonym Eskymo Welzl or the nickname Arctic Bismarck.

Rudolf Těsnohlídek began to write down his adventures on the basis of conversations with him. Pavel Eisner continued but did not finish and later Bedřich Golombek and Edvard Valenta completed the work. The book Třicet let na zlatém severu ("Thirty Years in the Golden North") had great success in Czechoslovakia and also abroad, where people suspected that "Eskymo Welzl" did not exist and that the real author was Karel Čapek, who wrote the preface to foreign editions.

== Biography ==
Welzl was born on 15 August 1868 in Zábřeh, Moravia. After attending primary school, he was trained as a locksmith in Zvole and became a journeyman in 1884. The next two years he travelled a significant part of the Austro-Hungarian Empire on foot. After his army service he went to Genoa, where he was hired as a stoker on a ship going to the United States. He did not remain in the US but sailed on to Vladivostok. From 1892, he worked as labourer in Port Arthur on the borders of Russia and China.

The next year he went to Irkutsk, where he helped build the Trans-Siberian Railway, but after a few months he left the job and started to walk to Yakutsk, Verkhoyansk, Kolyma and eventually to the New Siberian Islands, where he allegedly lived for the next 28 years. On the New Siberian Islands and later in Alaska Welzl worked as a fur hunter, trader and also acted as an unofficial Justice of the Peace. His activities as the judge when fighting the crime (especially the robberies among the fur traders and moonshine sales) were leaning towards vigilantism and even included lynching the offenders. His business was said to be spread from Franz Josef Land to Northern Canada, where he supplied hunters, gold miners and Arctic explorers with food, medicine, ammunition and other necessities. He also delivered mail by dogsled. He had friendly relationship with the Inuit in Alaska and Canada, as he treated them with respect and without prejudice. He was known among the Inuit as Bear Eater and claimed they voted him as their chief. This fact and others about his contacts with the indigenous population of the far north is hard to prove. It is not even certain if he knew the Inuit language, because his examples of 'Eskymo language' in his books are, from a linguistic perspective, questionable or almost nonsensical.

In 1924, Welzl's ship the Seven Sisters was wrecked on the Pacific coast of the US where he was interrogated by the American government and deported to Europe. He languished in Hamburg, from where he sent a few letters to Czechoslovakia. The letters initialized his correspondence with the journalist Rudolf Těsnohlídek. He later published the book Eskymo Welzl where he used the letters, but he never personally met Welzl himself. It was Welzl's second visit of Europe, when he went to Czechoslovakia. He met with the president Tomáš Garrigue Masaryk on 29 November 1928 in Prague and then onto to his hometown of Zábřeh. There Welzl contacted the newspaper Lidové noviny, where Tesnohlidek used to work. But he was already deceased at that time.

In June 1929, Welzl went through Hamburg to Canada and he settled in Dawson City in Yukon. He longed to return to the New Siberian Islands, but the Soviet government would not allow him. He died on 19 September 1948 in Dawson City and is buried in the public cemetery.

== Honours ==
The asteroid 15425 Welzl, discovered on 24 September 1998, is named after him.

== Bibliography ==
- Rudolf Těsnohlídek (on the basis of Welzl memoirs and letters), Paměti českého polárního lovce a zlatokopa ("Memoirs of a Czech Polar Hunter and Gold-digger"), 1928
- Bedřich Golombek, Edvard Valenta (on the basis of Welzl's own accounts), Třicet let na zlatém severu ("Thirty Years in the Golden North")
- Bedřich Golombek, Edvard Valenta, Po stopách polárních pokladů ("On the Tracks of Polar Treasures")
- Bedřich Golombek, Edvard Valenta, Trampoty eskymáckého náčelníka v Evropě ("Trails of an Eskimo Chief in Europe")
- Bedřich Golombek, Edvard Valenta, Ledové povídky Eskymo Welzla ("Ice Tales of Eskimo Welzl")
- Rudolf Krejčí: Cesta kolem světa 1893-1898 / Jan Welzl ("Travels Around the World 1893-1898 / Jan Welzl"); [translated from a German manuscript plus accompanying texts] Pravda a fikce o životě Jana Welzla ("Truth and Fiction about the Life of Jan Welzl") and Století od jeho cesty ("A Century after his Travels") ISBN 80-7185-132-9
- Martin Strouhal: Svoboda pod bodem mrazu - Příběhy a záhady, které zanechal největší český polárník Jan Eskymo Welzl I. vydání 2009 ISBN 978-80-86438-28-3
- Martin Strouhal: Svoboda pod bodem mrazu - Příběhy a záhady, které zanechal největší český polárník Jan Eskymo Welzl II. rozšířené a upravené vydání 2014 ISBN 978-80-905367-2-2(Freedom below freezing - Stories and mysteries left by the greatest Czech explorer - Jan Eskymo Welzl)

Jan Welzl, "The Quest for Polar Treasures" 1933, Macmillan, New York
