= Kunčičky =

Coordinates: 49°48′31″N 18°18′13″E

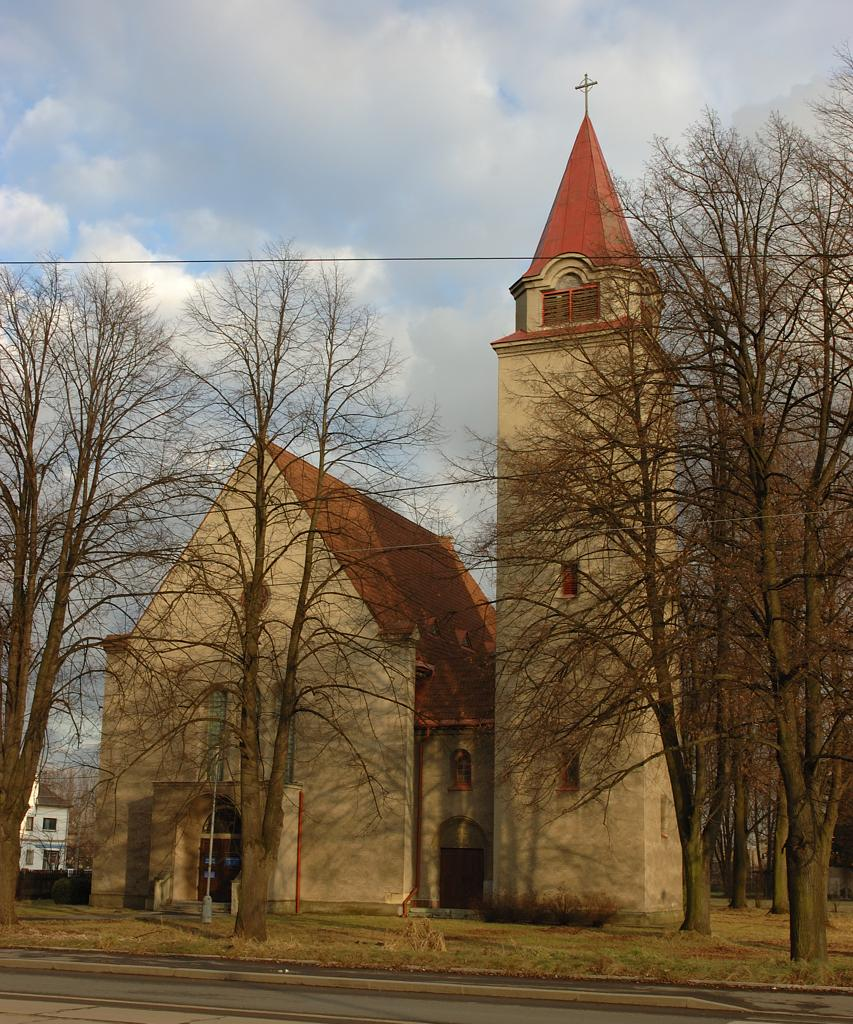
Greek Catholic church in Kunčičky

Kunčičky (Polish: Kończyce Małe, German: Klein Kuntschitz, till 1924 known as Malé Kunčice) is a part of the city of Ostrava, Moravian-Silesian Region in the Czech Republic. Administratively it is a part of the district of Slezská Ostrava. Kunčičky was formerly an independent municipality, in 1941 it became a part of Ostrava.

== History ==
It lies in the historical region of Těšín Silesia and was first mentioned in 1380 as Nowe Kunczicze(?). Later it was mentioned also wenig Kunczendorf (1388), Male Kuncicze (1476), Klein Kuntschitz (1652), Male Kunczicze (1674) and so on.

Politically the village belonged initially to the Duchy of Teschen, formed in 1290 in the process of feudal fragmentation of Poland and was ruled by a local branch of Piast dynasty. In 1327 the duchy became a fee of the Kingdom of Bohemia, which after 1526 became part of the Habsburg monarchy.

It witnessed heavy industrialization in the second half of the 19th century, several coal mines were dug here, most important was Alexander Coal Mine.

According to the Austrian census of 1910 the village had 4,607 inhabitants, 4,568 of whom had permanent residence there. Census asked people for their native language, 198 (4.3%) were German-speaking, 3,480 (76.2%) were Czech-speaking and 890 (19.5%) were Polish-speaking. Most populous religious groups were Roman Catholics with 4,352 (94.5%) and Protestants with 215 (4.7%).
