= Susanne Beyer (journalist) =

German journalist and author

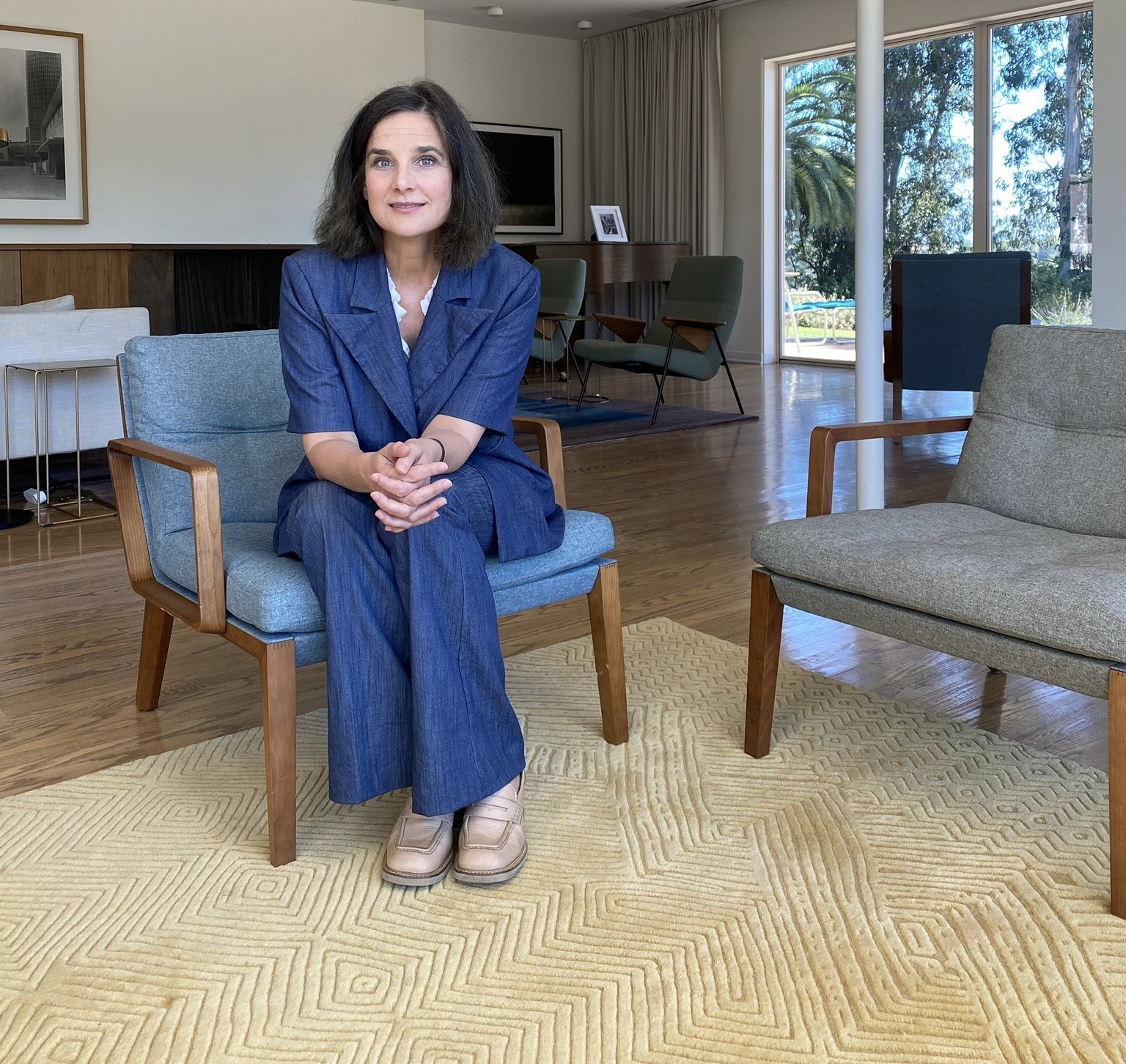
- Susanne Beyer (2025)
- Born: June 20, 1969 (age 57); Balige, Indonesia
- Occupations: Journalist, author
- Employer: Der Spiegel

Susanne Beyer (born 20 June 1969) is a German journalist and author. She has been a member of the editorial team at the news magazine Der Spiegel since 1996, notably serving as its first female deputy editor-in-chief from 2015 to 2018.

== Early life and education ==
Beyer was born in Balige on the Indonesian island of Sumatra. She attended school in Wuppertal and Bielefeld, Germany. She studied German studies, history, and journalism at the University of Bamberg and the University of Vienna. After earning her degree, she trained at the Deutsche Journalistenschule (DJS) in Munich.

== Career ==
=== Journalism ===
Beyer began her career at Bayerischer Rundfunk and as a freelance contributor to the magazine of the Süddeutsche Zeitung. She also worked for various daily newspapers and a news agency.

In October 1996, Beyer joined Der Spiegel as an editor in the culture department, where she worked for 18 years. In January 2014, she was appointed deputy head of the culture department. From February 2015 to December 2018, she served as deputy editor-in-chief of the magazine, the first woman to hold this position.

Since January 2019, she has been a reporter and author for the capital bureau and the editor-in-chief's office. In 2023, she briefly took over as head of the science department on an interim basis. Beyer is also a lecturer at the Deutsche Journalistenschule.

=== Literary work and themes ===
Beyer's work frequently explores feminism and the reality of women's lives. In 2009, she published a biography of the dancer Gret Palucca. Her 2021 book Die Glücklichen ("The Happy Ones") portrays women in the middle years of their lives, drawing on conversations with public figures such as Claudia Schiffer, Christiane Paul and Katarina Barley as well as lesser-known women.

Another central theme in her writing is the legacy of the National Socialist past. In 2015, she co-edited a volume of survivor accounts from the Auschwitz concentration camp with Martin Doerry. Her 2025 book Kornblumenblau is a personal investigation into the death of her grandfather, a chemist who, as a specialist in synthetic rubber, worked for the Reichsamt für Wirtschaftsausbau in cooperation with IG Farben near the Auschwitz complex during the Nazi era. Reviewing the book on the literary platform literaturkritik.de, Oliver Pfohlmann noted that Beyer approaches the family's reassuring legends with deliberate skepticism while securing the underlying facts in journalistic fashion, and situated the work among recent books by descendants confronting their relatives' Nazi-era pasts. He concluded that, although she lacks documentary proof, Beyer comes to believe her grandfather very probably knew of the crimes committed nearby. Pfohlmann also reviewed the book in the Neue Zürcher Zeitung, where he characterised her account as emotionally engaged and subjective. The book was shortlisted for the NDR Non-Fiction Prize in 2025; the prize jury called it a courageous and well-written examination of her own family.

Beyer was a fellow at the Thomas Mann House in Los Angeles, where she researched the application of mediation concepts to public debate and journalism. She has served as a juror for the German Non-Fiction Prize (2020).

== Awards ==
- 2018: Listed among Medium Magazin "Journalists of the Year" (Culture category, second place), recognised for her reporting on the #MeToo reckoning within the media industry.
- 2025: Shortlisted for the NDR Non-Fiction Prize for Kornblumenblau.

== Selected bibliography ==
- Palucca. Die Biografie. AvivA, Berlin 2009, ISBN 978-3-932338-35-9.
- „Mich hat Auschwitz nie verlassen". Überlebende des Konzentrationslagers berichten. (ed., with Martin Doerry). DVA, Munich 2015.
- Die Glücklichen. Warum Frauen die Mitte des Lebens so großartig finden. Blessing, Munich 2021, ISBN 978-3-89667-680-1.
- Kornblumenblau. Der geheimnisvolle Tod meines Großvaters 1945 und die Frage, was er mit den Nazis zu tun hatte. DVA, Munich 2025, ISBN 978-3-421-07042-5.
