= Muglinov =

Coordinates: 49°51′8″N 18°18′17″E

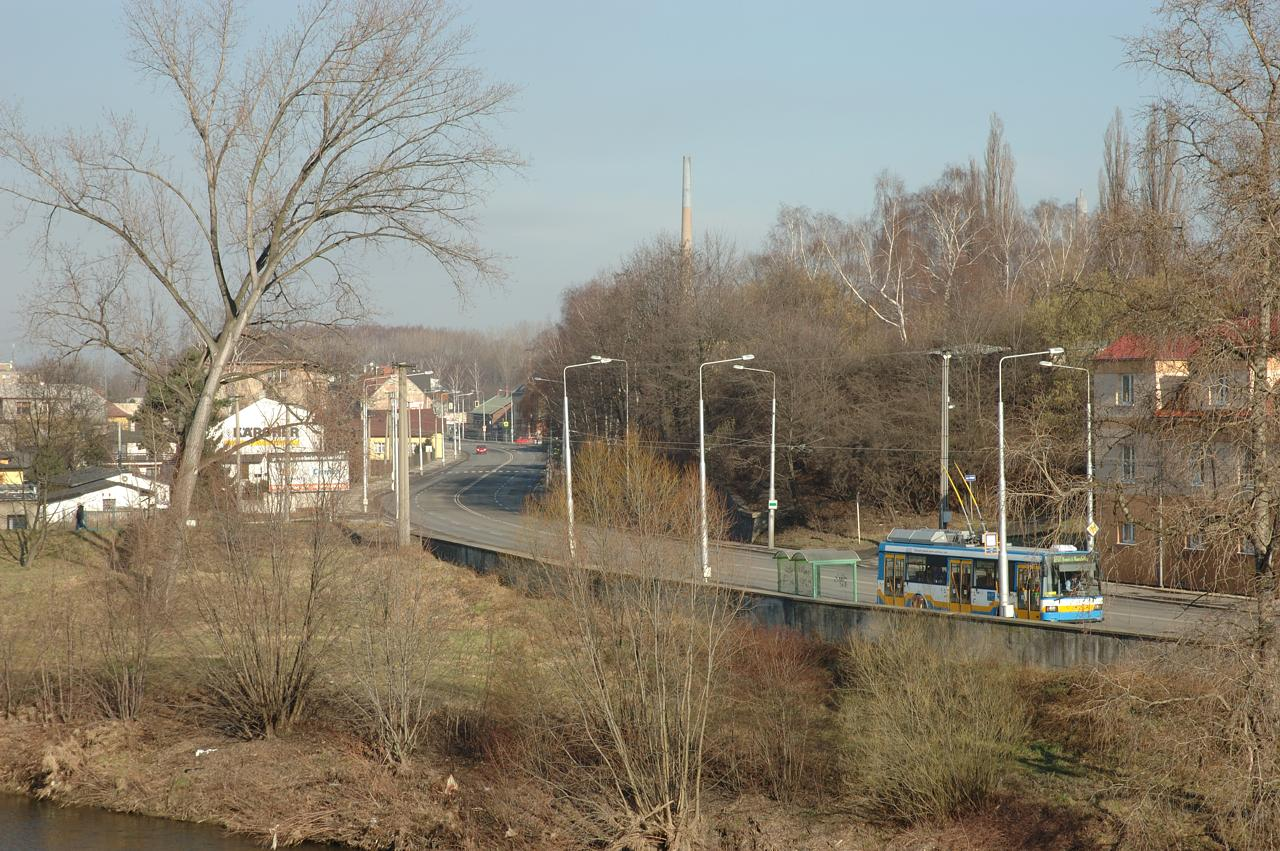
Bohumín Street in Muglinov

Muglinov (Polish: Muglinów, German: Muglinau) is a part of the city of Ostrava, Moravian-Silesian Region in the Czech Republic. Administratively it is a part of the district of Slezská Ostrava.

== History ==
The settlement was first mentioned in a Latin document of Diocese of Wrocław called Liber fundationis episcopatus Vratislaviensis from around 1305 as item in Muglin. It meant that the village was in the process of location (the size of land to pay tithe from was not yet precised). The creation of the village was a part of a larger settlement campaign taking place in the late 13th century on the territory of what will be later known as Upper Silesia.

Politically the village belonged initially to the Duchy of Teschen, formed in 1290 in the process of feudal fragmentation of Poland and was ruled by a local branch of Piast dynasty. In 1327 the duchy became a fee of Kingdom of Bohemia, which after 1526 became part of the Habsburg monarchy.

It witnessed heavy industrialization in the 19th century. Muglinov was formerly an independent municipality, in 1941 it became a part of Ostrava.

According to the Austrian census of 1910 the village had 2,647 inhabitants, 2,551 of whom had permanent residence there. Census asked people for their native language, 136 (5.3%) were German-speaking, 1,662 (65.1%) were Czech-speaking and 753 (29.5%) were Polish-speaking. Most populous religious group were Roman Catholics with 2,551 (96.4%).
