= Franz Beyer =

Franz Beyer may refer to:

- Franz Beyer (musicologist) (1922–2018), German musicologist
- Franz Beyer (general) (1892–1968), German World War II general
- Franz Beyer (pilot) (1918–1944), German World War II fighter pilot
