= Helga Beyer =

German resistance fighter (1920–1941)

- Born: 4 May 1920; Breslau, Weimar Republic (now Wrocław, Poland)
- Died: 1941 (aged 21); Ravensbrück concentration camp, Nazi Germany
- Known for: German resistance

Helga Beyer (4 May 1920 – 1941) was a German resistance fighter.

== Biography ==
Beyer was born in Breslau. She had a sister Ursula who survived the Second World War and later had family in America. Her Jewish father ran a small, thriving lamp factory in Breslau. At the age of 13, Helga Beyer was already a member of the Communist Party of Germany (KPO). She was also active in the Comrades, German-Jewish Hiking Association (Comrades-in-Charge). She worked as a courier in the German-Czech border region, delivering valuable information about the SPD's exiled executive committee to Breslau. She also supported families in hiding and arrested friends by collecting donations. She also wrote poems against National Socialism. On 28 January 1938, she was arrested and sentenced to three and a half years in prison in a high treason trial. She was subsequently imprisoned in the Ravensbrück concentration camp and later died there at the age of 21. She left behind a series of letters that have been historically evaluated.

== Literature ==
- Weiße Möwe, gelber Stern. Dietz. 1987.
- Antje Dertinger: Helga Beyer (1920–1942). Jung und jüdisch gegen das Regime, in: Florence Hervé (Hrsg.), Mit Mut und List. Europäische Frauen im Widerstand gegen Faschismus und Krieg, Köln 2020, ISBN 978-3-89438-724-2.
