= Leslie Joan Baier =

American scientist

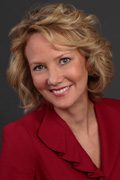
- Education: Lawrence University (B.A.); University of Michigan (Ph.D.)
- Scientific career
- Workplaces: National Institute of Diabetes and Digestive and Kidney Diseases
- Thesis: Isolation and characterization of a human DNA binding protein which contains an Antp homeobox sequence (1990)
- Doctoral advisor: Gary Nabel

Leslie Joan Baier is an American scientist with a specific focus on the genetic pathophysiology of type 2 diabetes. She is a senior investigator in diabetes molecular genetics at the National Institute of Diabetes and Digestive and Kidney Diseases. She has an undergraduate degree from Lawrence University and a Ph.D. from the University of Michigan. Gary Nabel played an important role in her doctoral research. Now, she continues to do research on her special interest: Indigenous peoples compared to those who obtain diabetes. She has slowly moved to the peoples of Phoenix instead of Indigenous peoples. Baier has several publications of her own, and many collaborating publications.

== Education ==
In 1982, Baier graduated from Lawrence University in Appleton, Wisconsin. There, she obtained a Bachelor of Arts in biology and chemistry. After undergrad, she attended the University of Michigan and graduated in 1990 with a Ph.D. in cell and molecular biology. During her time at the University of Michigan, she grew close to her doctoral advisor, Gary Nabel. He inspired her to write her dissertation that was titled "Isolation and characterization of a human DNA-binding protein which contains an Antp homeobox sequence." She also has extra training at Arizona State University in Phoenix as a postdoctorate.

== Current career ==
After obtaining her Ph.D., Baier began working at the Phoenix Epidemiology and Clinical Research Branch as the senior investigator in the Diabetes Molecular Genetics Section. This branch is part of the National Institute of Diabetes and Digestive and Kidney Diseases. Baier has a high focus on Indigenous peoples and how diabetes affects their communities, as they are extremely susceptible to type 2 diabetes. Baier works closely with the Pima Indian Community and has now branched out to poor communities in central Phoenix. Along with scientific research, Baier is an adjunct professor at the University of Arizona College of Medicine in Tucson and at Arizona State University in Phoenix. She frequently mentors students attending high school, community college, and undergraduate programs. In addition to lower-level degrees and schooling, Baier often spends time with postbaccalaureate and postdoctoral trainees.

== Research ==
Baier's research is focused on finding genetic links to type 2 diabetes and obesity in Indigenous people such as the Pima Community. She and Robert Hanson, M.D., M.P.H., focus on people's genetics to understand who is most likely to get sick. If they are able to spot this early, they are more likely to help them to stay healthy and to determine what treatment makes the most sense for each person's unique body. Baier and Hanson are discovering "hidden" genes that cause diabetes by examining the distinct DNA of Indigenous populations. Instead of employing a generic strategy that might not work, they are leveraging this information to develop individualized medicines that are tailored to each person's unique genetic composition.

=== The big picture: Research broken down ===
==== Genes v. Environment ====
Developing type 2 diabetes is not simply because people are eating similar foods or moving around less. Baier's research suggests that although someone's environment (food and exercise) plays a role, people's DNA (genetics) determines how our bodies react to that environment.

==== How the research is done ====
Baier and Hanson use custom research tools developed for this community rather than standardised tests. Their methods include custom genetic maps, the GPR158 discovery, and the insulin connection.

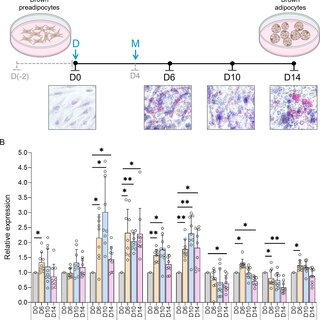
Baier and Hanson's custom genetic mapping with the Indigenous people in southwest Arizona.

Standard tests tend to miss things because they are designed by European DNA. By studying 10,000 Indigenous peoples, they were able to create a custom map that discovered 92% of unique genetic variations.

The GPR158 discovery:

Baier and Hanson found a gene variation that slows down how fast a person burns energy. The gene's "risk" version is found in 60% of the Indigenous community, but in less than 1% of Caucasians.

The insulin connection:

They also found that variations of a gene called KCNQ1 make it harder for the body to quickly release insulin, which directly leads to diabetes.

==== Testing treatments in the lab ====
They are using "stem cell" technology instead of guessing the correct drugs that could work in order to test treatments safely.

Mini organs:

Baier and Hanson grow beta-like cells from the stem cells in the lab. Beta-like cells are the ones in the pancreas that create insulin.

Simulation:

Then, Baier and Hanson give those lab-grown cells sugar to observe how they react, mimicking exactly how an actual human body reacts.

Targeted medicine:

These cells are used to test specific drugs. This allows the two scientists to see if a certain medicine works on different, unique genetic mutations before giving it to a patient.

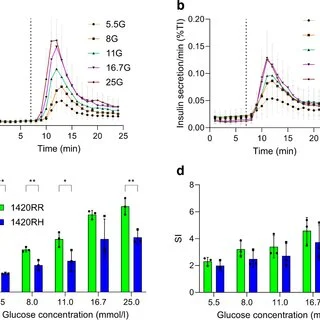
Baier and Hanson's medicine graph uses stem cells and beta-like cells that affect the pancreas and insulin output.

==== The breakdown ====
By looking at the family histories and DNA over multiple decades, Baier and Hanson found the specific genes that put Indigenous populations at risk for getting type 2 diabetes and obesity. However, they were surprised to find that these genes are more likely found in certain communities, such as the Pima Indian Community, than others, which helps explain why these groups are getting sick more often.

==== Further study ====
As medicine becomes increasingly personalized and technology-driven, Baier and Hanson argue that greater representation in medical research is important. They state that research limited to a single population may reduce the effectiveness of treatments for other groups. They also note that including minority and ethnic communities in research may help address disparities in health outcomes, as these populations often experience higher rates of certain diseases.

== Publications ==
Throughout her professional career, Baier has published approximately 253 academic and research papers. From 2016 to 2026, she published 56 (91.8%) journal articles, four (6.6%) book chapters, and one (1.6%) preprint. From 2016 to 2026, Baier published 78 open access articles.

Open Access Articles from 2016-2026
Genetice & Genomes	46
Diabetes	14
Cytogenics	3
Hematology	3
Chronobiology	2
Digestive Disorders	2
Lipids	2
Lysosomal Digestive Disorders	2
Noncoding RNA	2
Urology	2

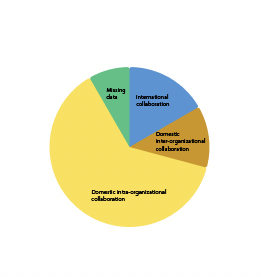
A pie chart, color-coded, that represents Baier's collaborations.

Baier also has 24 collaboration articles between 2016 and 2026. She has 15 (16.7%) articles in domestic intra-organizational collaboration, 4 (16.7%) in international collaboration, 3 (12.5%) in domestic inter-organizational collaboration, and 2 in missing data (8.3%).

Topic Source Titles
Diabetes	20
Diabetologia	7
Obestiy	7
The Journal of Clinical Endocrinology & Metabolism	3
Human Genetics	2
Human Molecular Genetics	2
International Journal of Obesity	2
Annals of the New York Academy of Sciences	1
BMC Genomics	1
Cells	1

== Personal life ==
Besides being a scientist and helping students in their fields of study, Baier enjoys dancing, taking her daughters to Nordstrom with her, and playing Candyland with her grandchildren.
