= Hrabová (Ostrava) =

Neighborhood of Ostrava, Czech Republic

Coordinates: 49.7756°N 18.2807°E

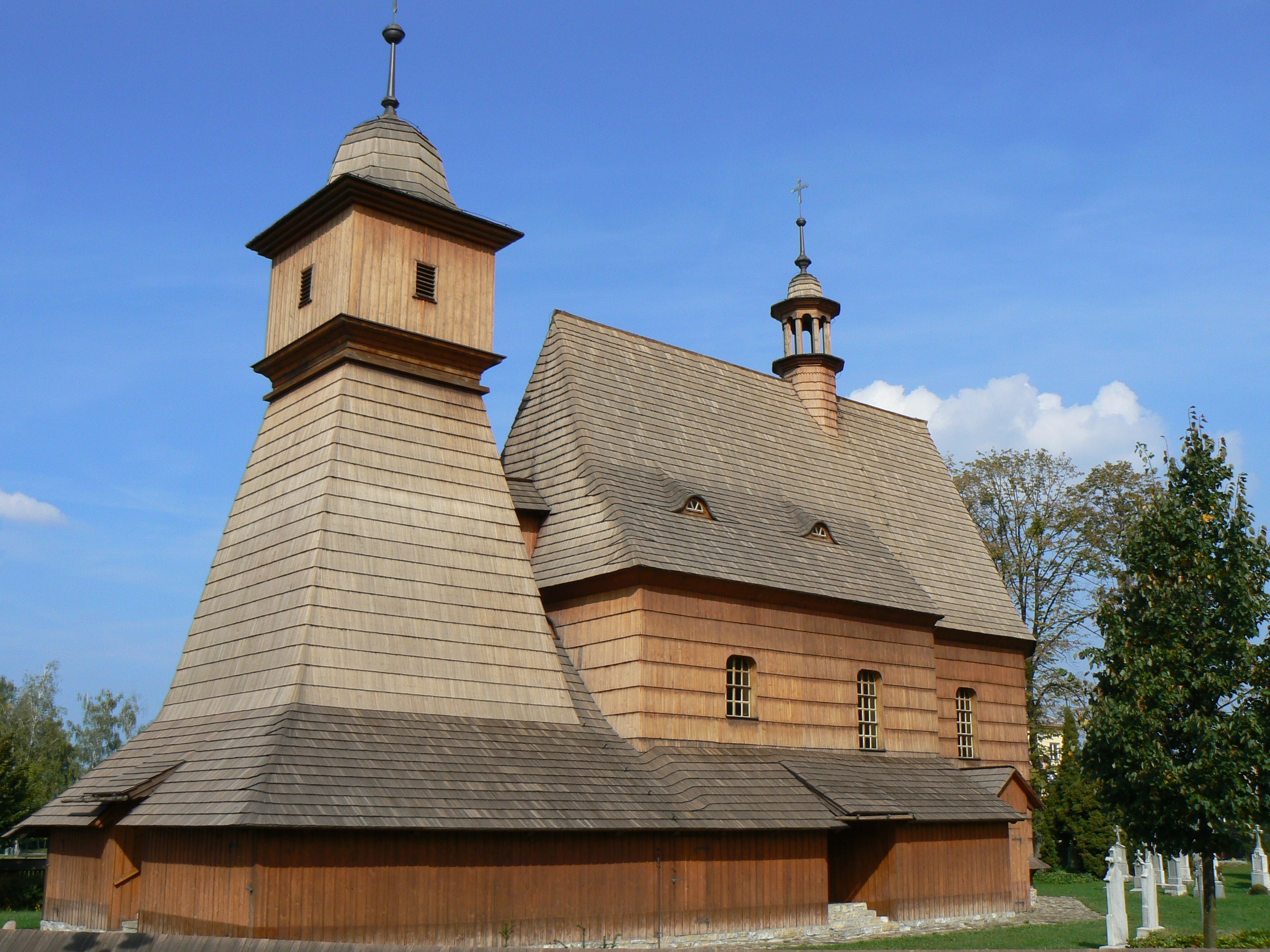
Saint Catherine Church

Hrabová is a municipal district of the city of Ostrava, Czech Republic. It is located on the south side of the city. The Ostravice River flows through the district. The district has a primary school, nursery schools, medical facilities, a post office and the municipal police.
