= Beier =

Beier is a German surname. Notable people with the surname include:

- Albert Beier (1900–1972), German footballer
- Carol A. Beier, Kansas Supreme Court Justice
- Christina Beier (born 1984), German ice dancer, sister of William Beier
- Emil Beier (1893–1985), German Nazi politician and Mayor of Ostrava, Czechoslovakia
- Eugene Beier (born 1940), American physicist
- Frank Beier, German orthopedist
- Grete Beier (1885–1908), German murderer and last death penalty recipient in Saxony
- Günter Beier (born 1942), German gymnast
- Karin Beier (born 1965), German theatre director
- Klaus Michael Beier (born 1961), German physician
- Lene Beier (born 1977), Danish television presenter
- Max Beier (1903–1979), Austrian arachnologist
- Peter Beier, namesake and co-founder of Peter Beier Chokolade
- Priidu Beier (born 1957), Estonian poet and teacher
- Robert Beier (1940–2017), birth name of Canadian wrestler Bob Sweetan
- Tara Beier, Canadian singer-songwriter
- Tom Beier (born 1945), former American football safety
- Ulli Beier (1922–2011), German editor, writer and scholar
- Werner Beier (born 1936), German sports shooter
- Wilhelm Beier (1913–1977), German WWII flying ace
- William Beier (born 1982), German ice dancer, brother of Christina Beier

== See also ==
- Beier variable-ratio gear, a mechanical drive
- Beyer
