= Theodore Bayer =

Publisher (1893–1959)

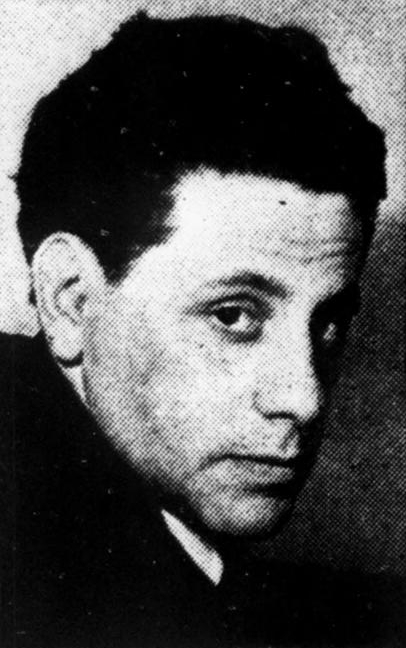
Bayer c. 1941

Theodore Bayer (October 23, 1893 – March 7, 1959) was president of the Russky Golos, or Russian Voice Publishing Company, which published an anti-capitalist Russian-language newspaper during the Great Depression and World War II. Russky Golos was funded by the Comintern and by advertising, commercial newsstand and subscription sales. Its editorial position was closely aligned with the Communist Party of the United States (CPUSA). Bayer was part of a Soviet military intelligence (GRU) network.

As president of Russky Golos, Bayer got to know John Hazard Reynolds, who provided financial support to a publication entitled Soviet Russia Today, and recommended him to Communist Party of the United States (CPUSA) General Secretary Earl Browder.

In a July 1943 Venona project decryption sent by the New York GRU Rezident Pavel Mikhailov to Moscow, Bayer is credited with describing a CPUSA source near President Franklin Roosevelt as a woman 'from an aristocratic family, who has known the President and his wife for a long time, evidently a secret member of the CPUSA.' The message included praise of Joseph Stalin's leadership and an allegation that Soong Mei-ling (Madame Chiang Kai-shek) was "a narcotics addict." The GRU later identified the woman as Josephine Treslow.

Bayer worked with the National Council of American-Soviet Friendship (NCASF) from the mid-1940s until his death in 1959. He served as the Administrative Secretary. Richard Morford, executive director of the NCASF from 1946 to 1981, praised Bayer for his contributions to US-Soviet understanding during the early years of the Cold War. Theodore's wife, Minna Bayer, served as Secretary of the board of directors for the NCASF in the early 1970s.

The Report of the Subversive Activities Control Board found Theodore Bayer to be a high level and important member of the CPUSA.

== Venona ==
Theodore Bayer cover name as assigned by the GRU and deciphered in Venona project transcripts is SIMON. Bayer is referenced in the following Venona project decryptions:

- 1169 GRU New York to Moscow, 19 July 1943
- 1258–1259 GRU New York to Moscow, 31 July 1943
- 1350 GRU New York to Moscow, 17 August 1943

== Sources ==
- United States. Subversive Activities Control Board. Reports of the Subversive Activities Control Board. Washington. United States Government Printing Office. 1966. Vol. 1, pgs. 492, 495, 497, 502, 503, 507, 509, 514, 516, 529, 530. "...told by the national secretary, Fairchild, that Bayer's word was law in respondent (CPUSA). "; "...gave evidence showing Theodore Bayer as an important member of the Communist Party, and we so find. "
- FBI interview with John Reynolds, 7 June 1947, FBI Silvermaster file, serial 2503.
- John Earl Haynes and Harvey Klehr, Venona: Decoding Soviet Espionage in America (New Haven: Yale University Press, 1999), pgs. 96–97, 189, 213–214, 233.
