= Frank Beier =

German–Canadian orthopedist

- Born: November 26, 1965; Freiburg im Breisgau, Germany
- Died: July 18, 2025 (aged 59)

Academic background
- Education: BA, PhD, 1995, University of Erlangen–Nuremberg
- Thesis: Struktur und Regulation des humanen Typ X Kollagen Gens (1995)

Frank Beier was a German–Canadian orthopedist. He was a Tier 1 Canada Research Chair in Musculoskeletal Research at the University of Western Ontario.

== Early life and education ==
Frank Beier was born and raised in Germany where he completed his Diploma of Biology and PhD at the University of Erlangen–Nuremberg. He then traveled to North America to complete his post-doctoral training at the University of Calgary.

== Career ==
Following his post-doctoral training, Beier was recruited by the University of Western Ontario (UWO) to become an assistant professor in their Schulich School of Medicine & Dentistry. As a professor in the Department of Physiology and Pharmacology, Beier was appointed a UWO Faculty Scholars in recognition of his "international presence in his discipline and outstanding contributions to teaching and/or research." He also held a Tier 2 Canada Research Chair in Musculoskeletal Health from 2001 to 2011 before being promoted. In 2014, Beier was named a Tier 1 Canada Research Chair in Musculoskeletal Research to further his research on studying the connection between skeletal development and osteoarthritis.

As a result of his research and academic success, Beier was appointed Chair of the Department of Physiology and Pharmacology at the Schulich School of Medicine & Dentistry from April 1, 2018, to June 30, 2023. Following the appointment, he also received funding from the Arthritis Society to further his research on drugs to block the progression of osteoarthritis. In March 2019, Beier was honoured for his " pioneering work in applying genomics" with an Award for Basic Science Research from the Osteoarthritis Research Society International.
