= František Sláma (politician) =

Czech writer, traveller, lawyer and politician

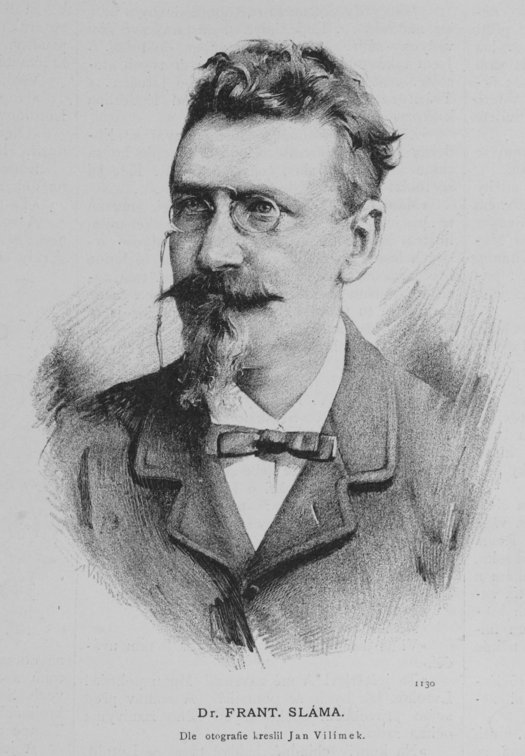
- František Sláma (1885)
- Born: 3 November 1850; Chotěboř, Kingdom of Bohemia
- Died: 25 April 1917 (aged 66); Brno, Moravia
- Citizenship: Austrian
- Occupations: Lawyer, politician, writer
- Writing career
- Notable work: Vlastenecké putování po Slezsku

Dr. František Sláma (3 November 1850 in Chotěboř – 25 April 1917 in Brno) was a Czech writer, traveller, lawyer and politician. He is known as the first person who spread the knowledge about Silesia to the Czech lands.

He came to Silesia in 1882 when began working as a judge in Cieszyn, the centre of the Duchy of Teschen. He then decided to travel across the Silesian territory, as he was fascinated by local history and traditions. His travels are documented in his most known book Vlastenecké putování po Slezsku (Patriotic Journeys through Silesia).

He was also a deputy in the Bohemian Diet in Prague from 1895 to 1907, and in the Austrian House of Deputies in Vienna from 1891 to 1911. Sláma was active in the Young Czech Party as well as many other organizations.

== Works ==
- Vlastenecké putování po Slezsku (1886)
- Ze zápiskův soudce (1888)
- Dějiny Těšínska (1889)
- U Trúby Štramberské (1890)
- Pán Lysé hory (1891)
- Černá kněžna (1891)
- Slezské pohádky a pověsti (1893)
- Z naší minulosti (1895)
- Jak stíhal strýc Bečka mořské loupežníky (1900)
