= Tomasz Bajer =

Polish artist

Tomasz Bajer (born 1979) is a Polish visual artist interested in contemporary phenomenons as well as conceptions centred on free culture, social and political issues.

In 1997, he was given a diploma and a reward for his artistic work at the Academy of Fine Arts in Wrocław (Poland). The artist has been a two-time grant holder of the Ministry of Culture and an artist-in-residence in Carrara, Essen, Strassbourg, Munich and Newcastle (UK); nominated for the Europaeisches Kolleg der Bildenden Kuenste in Berlin. His artistic activities involve conceptual art, action art, language art, installation, objects, sculpture, multimedia and painting.

In his works, the artist explores the issues of image, perception of reality and its iconic representation in media. He points out to contradictory messages in politics (culture jamming), economy and human rights. By using the same means and iconographic elements or by copying precisely the items, he creates an art work, which meaning is exactly the opposite of the original one.
