= Slezská Ostrava =

- City district of Ostrava
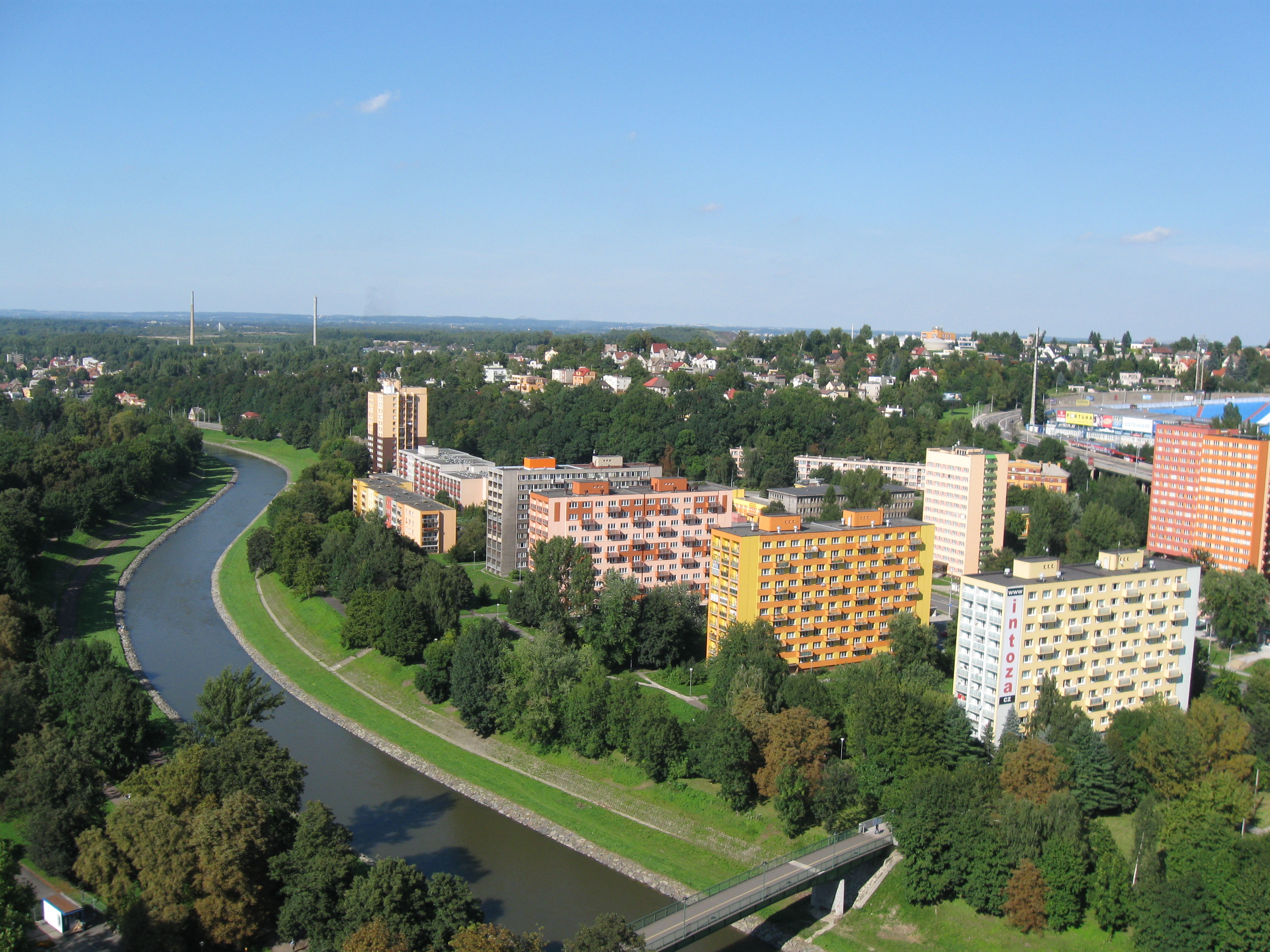
- Kamenec housing estate

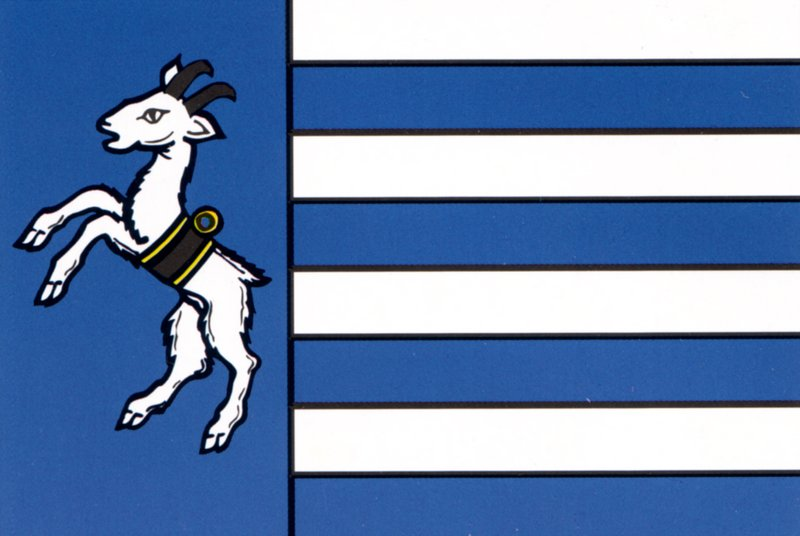
- Flag Coat of arms

- Location of Slezská Ostrava in Ostrava
- Coordinates: 49°50′14″N 18°17′54″E
- Country: Czech Republic
- Region: South Moravian Region
- City: Ostrava

Government
  - Mayor: Richard Vereš (ANO)

Area
  - Total: 41.4 km^{2} (16.0 sq mi)

Population (2021)
  - Total: 21,161
  - Density: 511/km^{2} (1,320/sq mi)
- Time zone: UTC+1 (CET)
  - Summer (DST): UTC+2 (CEST)
- Postal code: 710 00
- Website: https://slezska.ostrava.cz/cs

Slezská Ostrava (Polish: Śląska Ostrawa, lit. 'Silesian Ostrava'), till 1919 Polnisch Ostrau (Czech: Polská Ostrava, Polish: Polska Ostrawa, lit. 'Polish Ostrava'), is a district of the city of Ostrava, Moravian-Silesian Region in the Czech Republic. It lies in the historical region of Cieszyn Silesia, not counting Koblov and Antošovice lying north-west from the Oder river in the Hlučín Region.

It comprises historical city of Slezská Ostrava as well as market town of Hrušov and villages of Antošovice, Heřmanice, Koblov, Kunčice, Kunčičky and Muglinov.

== History ==
Ostrava was first mentioned in the document of Pope Gregory IX issued for Benedictine abbey in Tyniec in 1229 as Ostrawa. Politically it belonged then to the Duchy of Opole and Racibórz, however it lay on the river Ostravice along which a border between the Silesia and Morava was first regulated in 1261. After founding the town of Moravská Ostrava between 1268 and 1278 on Moravian side, the village left on the Silesian side was called in contrary Slavic and later Polish. Since 1290 it belonged to the Duchy of Teschen, which in 1327 became a fee of Kingdom of Bohemia, which after 1526 became part of the Habsburg monarchy. In 1290, Duke Mieszko I of Cieszyn built a castle in Ostrava.

The village became a seat of a Catholic parish, mentioned in the register of Peter's Pence payment from 1447 among 50 parishes of Teschen deaconry as Ostravia. After 1540s Protestant Reformation prevailed in the Duchy of Teschen and a local Catholic church was taken over by Lutherans. It was taken from them (as one from around fifty buildings in the region) by a special commission and given back to the Roman Catholic Church on 26 March 1654.

The settlement of Polská Ostrava gained market town rights in 1879. In 1911-1913 a town hall have been built. In 1919 it became a part of Czechoslovakia and in November of that year it was renamed to Slezská Ostrava. On 17 September 1920 it gained city rights.

== Demographics ==
According to the Austrian census of 1910 Polnisch Ostrau had 22,892 inhabitants, 22,693 of whom had permanent residence there. Census asked people for their native language, 1,296 (5.7%) were German-speaking, 16,927 (74.6%) were Czech-speaking and 4,467 (19.7%) were Polish-speaking. Jews were not allowed to declare Yiddish, most of them thus declared the German language as their native. Most populous religious groups were Roman Catholics with 21,604 (94.4%), followed by Protestants with 933 (4%) and the Jews with 290 (1.3%).

Historical population

Year	Pop.	±%
1869	9,910	—
1880	15,590	+57.3%
1890	21,736	+39.4%
1900	34,453	+58.5%
1910	45,754	+32.8%

Year	Pop.	±%
1921	45,191	−1.2%
1930	46,680	+3.3%
1950	44,703	−4.2%
1961	36,731	−17.8%
1970	27,537	−25.0%

Year	Pop.	±%
1980	23,534	−14.5%
1991	19,466	−17.3%
2001	19,484	+0.1%
2011	21,161	+8.6%
2021	21,375	+1.0%

Source: Censuses

== Coats of arms of the district's parts ==
Antošovice	Heřmanice	Hrušov	Koblov
Kunčice	Kunčičky	Muglinov	Slezská Ostrava
