= Edvín Bayer =

Czech botanist (1862–1927)

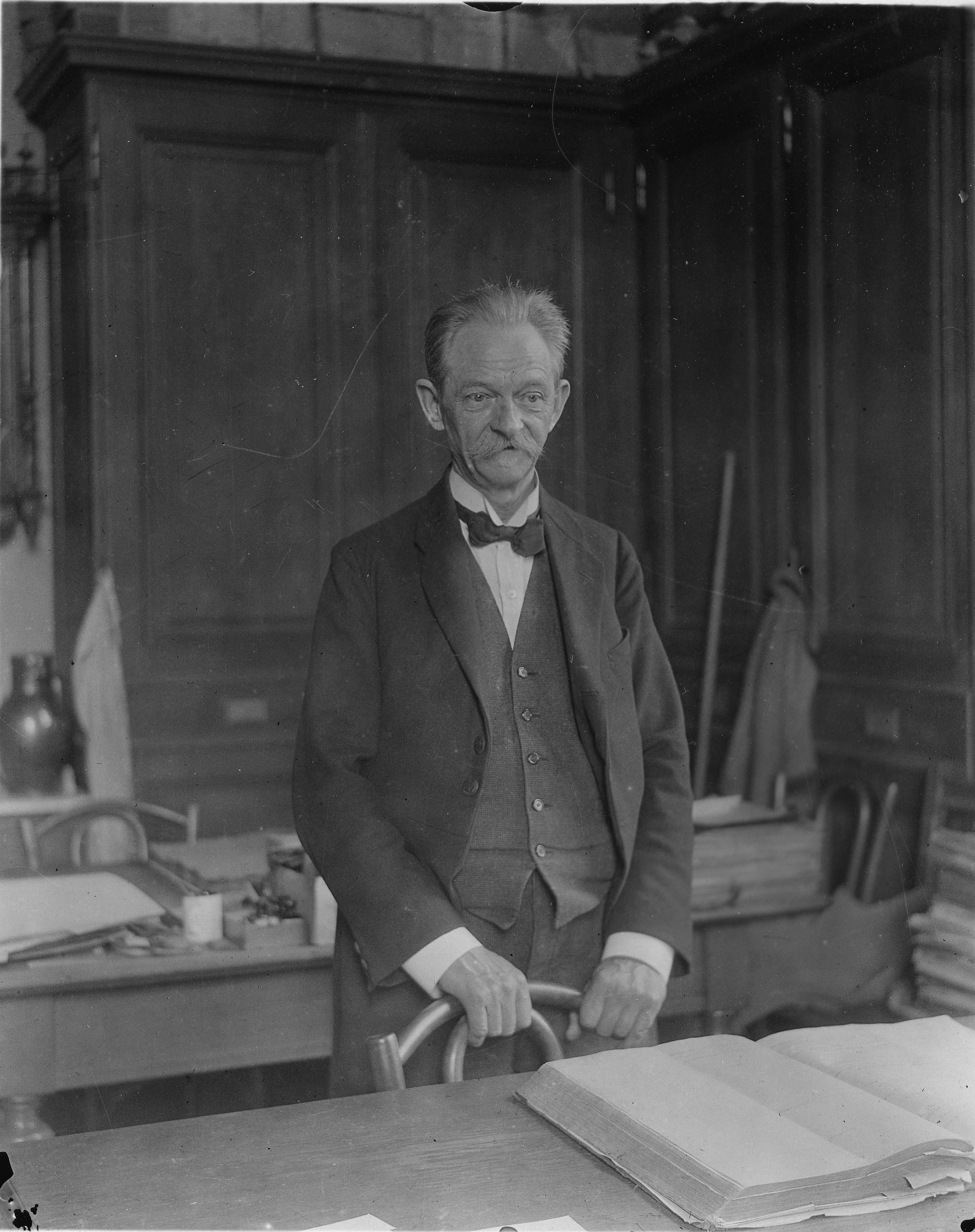
Bayer in his office on 12 July 1924

Edvín Bayer (anglicized as Edwin Bayer; 17 February 1862 – 17 March 1927) was a Czech botanist. He worked at the National Museum in Prague as curator and later the head of the department of botany. He specialised in lichens and paleobotany (the study of plant fossils).

== Biography ==
Bayer was born in Chotěboř, where his father was a notary. His brother Karel Bayer (1854–1930) became a prominent professor of surgery. He went to the local school before going in 1874 to the Prague gymnasium. In 1882 he joined the German University in Prague to study law but moved to the Czech University in Prague two years later to graduate in the natural sciences in 1888.

From 1887, he served as an assistant in the botanical collections of the Museum of the Kingdom of Bohemia under professor Ladislav Josef Čelakovský. In 1891, he earned a doctorate in philosophy, and the following year he was appointed assistant at the botanical institute of the Czech university.

He also worked in the palaeontological department of the museum, eventually becoming head of the phytopalaeontological section in 1895, and custodian of botanical collections from 1903. Between 1902 and 1921, he served as director of the museum's botanical division.

== Contributions to lichenology ==
Bayer played an important role in the early popularisation of lichenology in the Czech lands. He frequently published short, accessible articles drawing attention to distinctive and attractive lichen species in mountain areas such as the Krkonoše, Šumava, and surroundings of Prague and Chotěboř. His contributions to lichen taxonomy included several new taxa, including:

- Amphoroblastia bayeriana Servít
- Gyalidea diaphana var. bayeri (Servít) Vězda
- Dermatocarpon bayerianum Servít
- Physconia muscigena var. bayeri (Vězda) Poelt
- Polyblastia bayeriana Servít
- Pseudanthopyrenia bayeriana Servít
