= Edward A. Bayer =

American-Israeli Biophysicist

Professor Edward A. Bayer

Edward A. Bayer (Hebrew: אדוארד בייר) is an American-Israeli scientist.

== Education ==
He graduated with B.Sc. and M. Sc. in Zoology and Biology in University of Michigan and Wayne State University. He immigrated to Israel in 1971. He then graduated a Ph.D. in biophysics from the Weizmann Institute of Science, under the supervision of Meir Wilchek. Edward A. Bayer became a professor in the Weizmann Institute of Science in 2001 and published over 400 scientific papers. He is a member of the Scientific Advisory Board, of US-Department of Energy BioEnergy Science Center (BESC) since 2008 and of the Israel VATAT Planning and Budgeting Committee: National Subcommittee on "Energy & the Environment" and also serves as editor in several scientific journals.

== Scientific contributions ==
Edward A. Bayer participated in the development of avidin-biotin technology (together with Meir Wilchek) that contributed to the field of biorecognition and is intensively used in various biochemical applications, e.g. for affinity chromatography, affinity labeling, affinity therapy and many more. During his post-doctoral studies at Tel Aviv University, Edward A. Bayer co-discovered the Cellulosome (together with Raphael Lamed Professor at Tel Aviv University), an intricate multi-enzyme complex produced by many cellulolytic anaerobic microorganisms. In 1994, Edward A. Bayer proposed an original concept for the construction of designer cellulosomes, based on the specific affinity between cohesin and dockerin modules from the same bacterial species and type.

Designer cellulosome technology enables the precise incorporation of dockerin-containing enzymes into the scaffoldin subunit. Schematic representation of a trivalent designer cellulosome. The chimaeric enzymes bind to the divergent cohesins according to their specificity allowing control of the stoichiometric ratio and enzyme location.

These enzymatic complexes are composed of recombinant chimaeric scaffoldins and dockerin-containing enzyme hybrids and serve as nanomolecular tool for the characterization of cellulosomes. The use of designer cellulosome technology for the construction of a consolidated bioprocessing (CBP) organism to will combine enzyme production, cellulose hydrolysis, and fermentation into a single process for the conversion of lignocellulosic waste and biomass to valuables products such as sugars and biofuels has been demonstrated.

== Honors and awards ==
- 1979-1982 Recipient of NIH National Research Service Award.
- 1990 Recipient of The Sarstedt Research Award (together with Meir Wilchek) for "development of biotin-avidin systems for biomedical analysis." Presented by the German Association for Clinical Chemistry (Nümbrecht, Germany).
- 1993-1999 Peer-elected to General Council of the International Society for Molecular Recognition.
- 2002 Elected to Fellowship by the American Academy of Microbiology
- 2005-2009 Peer-elected to National Council of the Israeli Society of Microbiology
- 2006 Recipient of The Ulitzky Prize, The Israel Society for Microbiology
- 2007-2013 Peer-elected to General Council of the International Society for Molecular Recognition.
- 2013 Invited Member of the European Academy of Microbiologists
