= Richard Baier =

German journalist (born 1926)

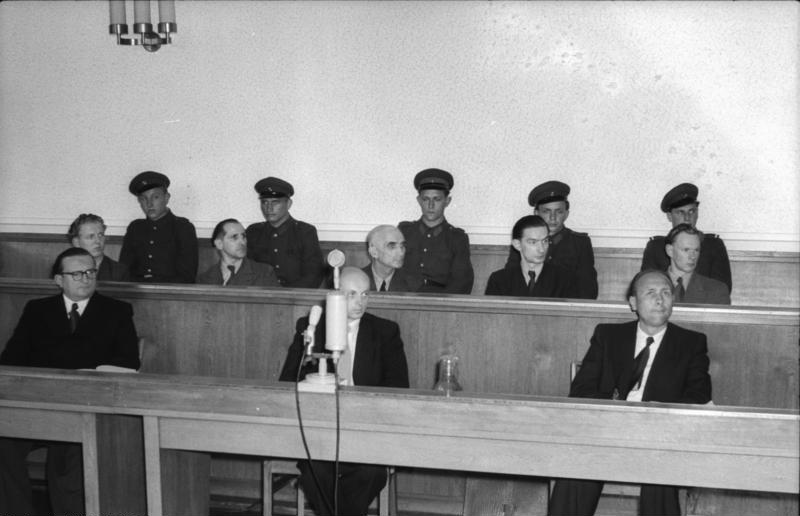
- The RIAS show trial (1955) The five defendants are the men in the second row
- Born: 27 November 1926 (age 99); Kassel, Prussia, Germany
- Occupations: Radio presenter and Reporter
- Spouse: Ute

Richard Baier (born 27 November 1926) is a German former journalist and radio presenter.

== Life ==
=== Provenance and early years ===
Richard Baier was born in Kassel where Ludwig Baier, his father, as "Kapellmeister", was in charge of music at the local theatre. Because of this connection Richard Baier found himself playing several child roles in local drama productions, but what he really wanted was to become a physician. The outbreak of war a couple of months before his thirteenth birthday made that impossible. However, as a teenager he received a Medical corps training in nearby Hofgeismar which involved four days of theoretical instruction and three days serving in an anti-aircraft unit.

=== Großdeutscher Rundfunk ===
After the incorporation of Austria into a "Greater Germany", the Minister for Public Enlightenment and Propaganda had reconfigured the country's national radio broadcaster into the Großdeutscher Rundfunk "Greater German Radio" organisation with effect from 1 January 1939. By 1943, with so many young men conscripted into the armed forces, there was an acute awareness that the only male voices heard on the national radio service were those of men "too old to fight", and there was a move to recruit a radio announcer with a "young voice". By October 1943 Baier's father was based in Berlin, providing musical accompaniment for musicians entertaining the troops, and it was through his contacts there that he became aware of the broadcaster's search for a young voice. This was how Richard Baier, a few days before his seventeenth birthday, found himself one of twenty candidates invited to Berlin for an interview-audition. Each was required to read an "army report" and a compilation of composers, opera titles and other music related words. Most had difficulty with correctly enunciating names such as "Puccini" and "Ravel", but for the son of the Kappelmeister these words were completely familiar. On 23 November 1943, the "day of the first heavy bombing raid on Berlin", Richard Baier was offered a six-month internship with the Großdeutscher Rundfunk.

He was now sent to work for the legendary sports reporter, Rolf Wernicke, who sent him to spend the next four weeks with the archives, mastering the basic elements of sport. Baier's first live broadcasting involved covering the sports news. From April 1944 he was also assigned the mid afternoon (15.00) army reports. His six months as an intern ended at the end of the month and, still aged only seventeen and a half, he received an employment contract. For June 1944 his name was added the news-readers' rota, delivering the morning (07.00) news for the first time on 1 June 1944, freshly minted, direct from the Propaganda Ministry. Less than two months later on 20 July 1944, it was Baier who read on the early evening news (18.32) the first radio report of the assassination attempt against the leader.

As the bombing worsened, from the start of 1944 radio transmissions came from a bunker, protected by several meters of concrete, adjacent to the Großdeutscher Rundfunk building. During the final months of the war just three people were left working in the radio bunker. Siegried Niemann was responsible for "entertainment" while Elmer Bantz and Richard Baier were responsible for "Politics". The Propaganda Ministry continued to provide the scripts, while the "eastern front" moved ever closer. On 30 April 1945 it was Baier who delivered the "Propaganda Report" for the army. There was no mention of Hitler's suicide two and a half hours earlier. That was reported only the next day. Following management instructions, on the day after that, 2 May 1945, Großdeutscher Rundfunk transmissions were officially concluded with a short statement, read out by Richard Baier.

=== US occupation zone ===
Military defeat, in May 1945, left the western two thirds of Germany divided into four military occupation zones. The area surrounding Berlin (though only the eastern part of Berlin itself) was now administered as the Soviet occupation zone. In the chaos of the collapsing state, on 3 June 1945. Baier made his way on foot out of Berlin in a south-westerly direction along the road towards Kassel, as far as Bad Sooden-Allendorf which was on the frontier between the part of Germany administered by the Soviets and that administered by the United States. Here he was reunited with his mother and sister. His father had disappeared in southern Poland during 1944. His mother and sister had thought Richard Baier had been killed in Berlin and were delighted that he was alive. The local town hall issued him with identity papers and a ration card. A few weeks later, at the start of July, the local US commander, Cecil Fischer, gave him his first postwar job, as a simultaneous translator.

It was as an interpreter that he took part on negotiations over the Wanfried agreement which led to a small (but locally significant) change in the frontier between the US and Soviet military occupation zones. After the US forces were withdrawn from Bad Sooden, Baier and his mother relocated the short distance to Eschwege. From here he provided news reports to the regional newspaper, the "Kasseler Zeitung". In 1947 he made his way to the local university, at Marburg, hoping to enroll as a medical student. Study places were in short supply, however, and the university was only accepting for matriculation those medical students who had already completed some terms of study before the outbreak of war back in 1939. Instead he embarked on a degree course as an "external student" in Contemporary History, Marburg having taken over the Institute for Contemporary History formerly at Königsberg, following the destruction of the former East Prussian capital. He emerged with a degree in April 1950. While working for his degree Baier also contributed reports for the "Hessische Neueste Nachrichten" (newspaper). Later he became editor in chief of the newly launched national sports magazine "Der Illustrierte Boxring". After just six months he managed to increase the circulation to more than 50,000 copies.

=== RIAS ===
In May 1949 the British, French and US occupation zones of Germany were conflated and relaunched as the US-sponsored West Germany. In October 1949 the Soviet occupation zone was relaunched as the Soviet-sponsored East Germany. In the heart of East Germany, Berlin continued to be divided up into the zones of occupation agreed between the victorious governments back in 1945. It was around 1950 that Richard Baier moved back to Berlin and took a job as a radio reporter with the American Sector Radio Service ("Rundfunk im amerikanischen Sektor" / RIAS). The RIAS had been set up in the US sector of Berlin in 1946 after the "allies" had failed to reach agreement on control over Berlin's existing Radio service, which had ended up in the eastern part of the city, which was Soviet occupation zone. The RIAS transmitter was sufficiently powerful to enable its broadcasts to be heard across virtually the whole of what was becoming known as East Germany. That would become a source of constant friction between the East and the West in the context of the emerging Cold War.

Although the political division of Berlin had been evident from a map back in 1945, at that time the divisions had been easy to ignore. After the currency reforms, the Berlin Blockade, and other events of 1948, the political division was increasingly mirrored by economic and social division, and during the 1950s those divisions were increasingly reflected by physical divisions in the form of check points. Nevertheless, even in 1955 it was perfectly possible for German residents to live in East Berlin (where rents and goods, if available, were far cheaper) and work in West Berlin (where rents and wages were higher). There were still plenty of people, including Richard Baier, who found it convenient and indeed interesting to do just that. During the early 1950s he became one of the best known presenters working on the RIAS.

In June 1953 Baier was able to report on the East German uprising. The events were little reported at the time in the west and only very selectively in East German media. But East Germans nevertheless enjoyed a fuller awareness of the uprising than most, partly on accounts of the RIAS news reports. RIAS reporter Richard Baier knew what was happening because he was there. He saw the angry people and the Red Army tanks in the streets between the Stalinallee (as East Berlin's showpiece boulevard was then known) and the Leipziger Platz ("Leipzig Circus"). He saw the burning street kiosks and the smashing of windows, along with the demonstrators using stone and pieces of wood to hit the tanks. The "Columbus House" was being targeted by demonstrators. "Here they thought there was a police listening post, but they only found a storage depot for a trading operation", Baier was able to report to his listeners. Also he shared his judgements of the situation: "If the Russians had wanted it, they could have served up a blood bath". In the days directly before the uprising he had been aware growing discontent. As he reported, the supply situation had worsened dramatically in the days and weeks before 17 June. Supply bottlenecks were making it impossible for scheduled production volumes to be produced. Where factories could not produce according to their quotas it was the workers in those factories who faced wage cuts. Official notice given out on 28 May 1953 of an imminent across-the-board price increase further stoked the discontent. Soon there was a banner fluttering from a building site across Walter Ulbricht's showpiece Stalinallee calling for a cut in the infamous production quotas. ("Runter mit den Normen"). Richard Baier had a sense of the seething anger. "There's something going on in the east" ("Im Osten tut sich was") he told RIAS colleagues on 15 June 1953. The next day several hundred construction workers demonstrated in front of East German ministry buildings, to be joined by fellow East Berliners. "From this point it's not just about cutting production quotas. The workers are demanding better living and working conditions, an increase in the food ration on the ration cards, better flour and potatoes" ("Es geht zu diesem Zeitpunkt schon nicht mehr nur um die Rücknahme der Normen, die Arbeiter fordern die Verbesserung der Arbeits-Lebensbedingungen, Erhöhung der Lebensmittelrationen auf den Lebensmittelkarten, besseres Mehl und Kartoffeln.") Baier was able to report. The next day, first by telephone and then turning up at the RIAS studios in person, a delegation of East German construction workers demanded that Egon Bahr, the station's editor in chief, allow them to use the station to broadcast a call for a general strike in East Germany. But Gordon Ewing, the US director of the radio channel, firmly rejected that idea. "A direct confrontation with the Soviet Union at that time was not part of the US agenda". Somehow the time of a demonstration to take place on 17 June in the Strausberger Platz nevertheless received several mentions over the air waves.

The first Soviet tanks rolled onto the streets of East Berlin in the early morning of 17 June. By around 7 o'clock the RIAS reporter was back on duty in the city centre. Trains filled with demonstrators were arriving. The morning was cold and it was raining. "The demonstrators now have political demands. They want the government to resign and they want free elections using a secret ballot" ("Die Demonstranten erheben jetzt politische Forderungen, sie wollen den Rücktritt der Regierung und freie und geheime Wahlen.") A massive military reaction got underway around midday. Baier saw Soviet tanks and troop trucks approaching from the Alexanderplatz. They moved slowly, stopping and then moving on again, relentlessly pushing the crowds before them. The tank guns were half raised and the soldiers also pointed their Kalashnikovs over the crowd, periodically firing warning shots. Baier heard the whistling of the bullets. By the end of the evening East Berlin was virtually sealed off. A curfew was in place from the early evening (18.00) till five the next morning. During the night Richard Baier slipped back across to the RIAS studio in West Berlin. "There was no thought of sleep. we were much too psyched up by events".

=== Nemesis deferred ===
RIAS audiences undoubtedly included officers of the East German Ministry for State Security (Stasi) who will also have subjected Baier to their more conventional surveillance techniques, but in the immediate aftermath of the June 1953 uprising Richard Baier was evidently not at the top of their action list. The RIAS was clearly blamed for the events of 1953 (along with the CIA) and classified by the ruling party Politburo (and all who took their lead from it) as an "enemy broadcaster". Nevertheless, when Richard Baier returned to his East Berlin apartment on 19 June 1953, his personal situation appeared to have returned to normal. Not quite two years later, as he left for work on 13 April 1955 at around 07.30, the RIAS reporter was grabbed by two Stasi officers and bundled into a "waiting Wartburg". As Baier later remembered it "I had become engaged to be married on 11 April and on 13 April at 07.30 in the morning I was arrested in the Marienstraße". He was taken to the ministry's infamous investigation centre at Berlin-Hohenschönhausen. In the "submarine", as the interrogation rooms in the basement of the building were informally known, he was introduced for himself to a range of the Stasi's perfidious interrogation techniques. Sessions were held only at night. Detainees were handcuffed to heating pipes for several days on end. Baier was locked for six hours in a "standing only" cell the size of a broom cupboard. He was, however, spared the notorious "water cell" in which victims must stand up to their necks in water. "After a few weeks ... you're ready to say whatever they want to hear" ("Nach einigen Wochen bist du so weit, daß du alles sagst, was die hören wollen") he recalled, decades later. Many of his fellow internees were destroyed by the mental torture, and it would be many years before Baier was able to sleep through a night without suffering nightmares. "Only the gas chambers were missing" ("Es fehlten eigentlich nur die Gaskammern.").

It turned out that Richard Baier was one of 49 people "rounded up" by the Ministry for State Security during the early summer of 1955. They were identified collectively as "RIAS agents". Since 1953 the ministry had intensified activities against the broadcaster, both by trying to jam the signal and by introducing undercover spies into its offices in West Berlin. There is speculation that one of these spies had managed to steal the address book of a RIAS employee, which was then used to identify and target the 49 people arrested. Five of the forty nine were arbitrarily picked out for participation in a "show trial spectacular" before the Supreme Court. The five included Richard Baier and a 29 year old painter-decorator called Joachim Wiebach. The nation's leader, Walter Ulbricht took a close personal interest in the show trial. Instructions to the court included a hand-written correction by Ulbricht in which he wrote "Proposal: Death sentence" ("Vorschlag: Todesurteil") by the name of Wolfgang Wiebach. Wiebach was guillotined at the National Execution Facility in Dresden on 13 September 1955. Richard Baier, still aged only 29, was given a 13-year jail term for "espionage". After six years and nine months in prison, on 21 August 1961, and eight days after the erection of the Berlin Wall finally sealed off West Berlin from the eastern part of the city, Baier was released from jail as part of an amnesty. He was ordered to live in Potsdam: a Stasi officer drove him from the jail to the town hall and then came in with him in order to provide assistance with registration of his new domicile. Conditions for his release included a ban on professional work. Also, he was not to return to Berlin.

=== Released ===
After his release from jail Richard Baier undertook various jobs, at one stage working in the gardens of Sanssouci in a visitor support function (als "Parkbilderklärer"), and in the administration of concerts and guest performances. He married his wife, Ute, in 1968: she only learned much later about her husband's eventful past.

He was rearrested on 17 June 1982. The charge was "Public criticism of the German Democratic Republic and its Soviet partner-state" ("öffentlicher Herabwürdigung der DDR und der befreundeten Sowjetunion"). He was sentenced to another year in prison. His error had been to criticise the destruction of the Garrison Church in Potsdam as a crime against culture. After serving ten months of the twelve-month sentence he was released on probation, subjected to a more restrictive ban on working than before. He was, however, able to get work as a restaurant manager in the "Hans Marchwitza" House, an arts-focused establishment on the edge of the Old City Hall development in Potsdam.

1990 marked the end of the East German dictatorship, followed in October by reunification, which signalled the end of East Germany as a politically separate German state. After an absence of nearly half a century, Richard Baier moved back to Kassel.

=== Looking back ===
Baier was involved in the docu-drama Die letzte Schlacht (The Last Battle, 2005 ), in which his part is played by Marek Harloff.
