= Bajer =

Bajer may refer to:

- Fredrik Bajer (1837–1922), Danish Nobel Peace Prize laureate
- Tomasz Bajer (born 1971), Polish visual artist
- Lukáš Bajer (born 1984), Czech footballer
- Bajer Bridge, on the A6 motorway in Gorski Kotar, Croatia
- Koseze Pond, colloquially called Bajer, a pond in Ljubljana, Slovenia
