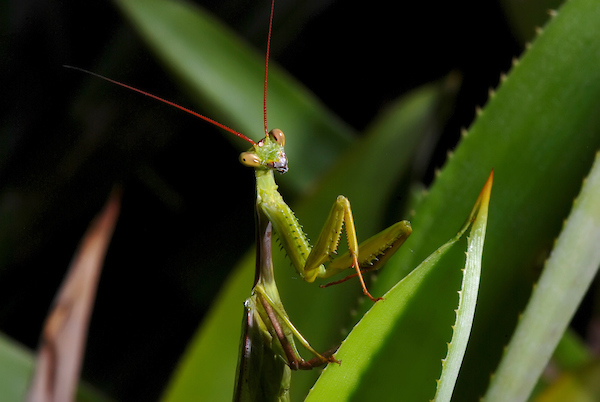
- Cardioptera brachyptera

Scientific classification
- Kingdom: Animalia
- Phylum: Arthropoda
- Clade: Pancrustacea
- Class: Insecta
- Order: Mantodea
- Superfamily: Acanthopoidea
- Family: Photinaidae; Giglio-Tos, 1915

= Photinaidae =

Family of praying mantises

Photinaidae is a family of mantises in the order Neotropical Mantodea, in the superfamily Acanthopoidea. There are about 11 genera and more than 40 described species in Photinaidae.

== Genera ==
These 11 genera belong to the family Photinaidae:

- Cardioptera Burmeister, 1838
- Chromatophotina Rivera, 2010
- Hicetia Saussure & Zehntner, 1894
- Macromantis Saussure, 1871
- Metriomantis Saussure & Zehntner, 1894
- Microphotina Beier, 1935
- Orthoderella Giglio-Tos, 1897
- Paraphotina Giglio-Tos, 1915
- Photina Burmeister, 1838
- Photinella Giglio-Tos, 1915
- Photiomantis Toledo Piza, 1968
