= Ostrava =

City in the Czech Republic

- Statutory city
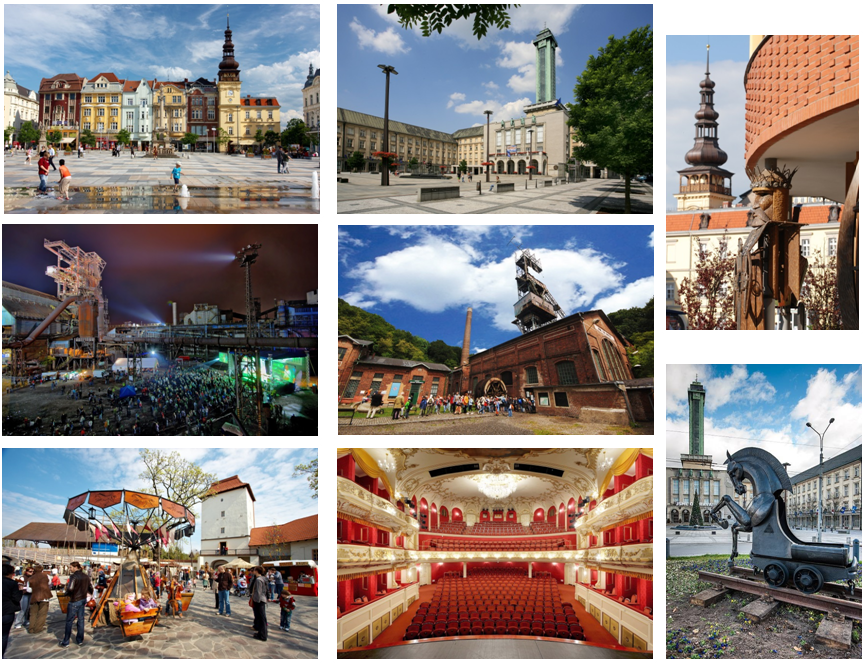
- From top – left: Masaryk Square, Colours of Ostrava, an amusement park in Silesian Ostrava Castle; middle: Ostrava New City Hall, Landek Park Mining Museum, Antonín Dvořák Theatre; right: Ostrava Puppet Theatre, Tribute to Mining statue.

- Flag Coat of arms Wordmark

- Location in the Czech Republic
- Coordinates: 49°50′8″N 18°17′33″E
- Country: Czech Republic
- Region: Moravian-Silesian
- District: Ostrava-City
- Founded: 1267

Government
  - Mayor: Richard Vereš (ANO 2011)

Area
  - Statutory city: 214.23 km^{2} (82.71 sq mi)
- Elevation: 260 m (850 ft)

Population (2026-01-01)
  - Statutory city: 280,853
  - Density: 1,311.0/km^{2} (3,395.4/sq mi)
  - Metro: 982,000

GDP
  - Metro: €21.184 billion (2021)
- Time zone: UTC+1 (CET)
  - Summer (DST): UTC+2 (CEST)
- Postal codes: 702 00, 703 00, 708 00, 709 00, 710 00, 711 00, 712 00, 713 00, 715 00, 716 00, 717 00, 719 00, 722 00, 723 00, 724 00, 725 25 – 725 28
- Website: www.ostrava.cz

Ostrava (Czech pronunciation: [ˈostrava]; Polish: Ostrawa, German: Ostrau) is a city in the north-east of the Czech Republic and the capital of the Moravian-Silesian Region. It has about 281,000 inhabitants. It lies near the border with Poland, at the confluences of four rivers: Oder, Opava, Ostravice and Lučina. Ostrava is the third largest city in the Czech Republic in terms of both population and area, the second largest city in the region of Moravia, and the largest city in the historical land of Czech Silesia. It straddles the border of the two historic lands of Moravia and Silesia. The wider conurbation — which also includes the towns of Bohumín, Havířov, Karviná, Orlová, Petřvald and Rychvald — is home to about 500,000 people, making it the largest urban area in the Czech Republic apart from the capital Prague.

Ostrava grew in importance due to its position at the heart of a major coalfield, becoming an important industrial engine of the Austrian empire. During the 20th century it was known as the "steel heart" of Czechoslovakia thanks to its status as a coal mining and metallurgical centre, but since the Velvet Revolution (the fall of communism in 1989) it has undergone radical and far-reaching changes to its economic base. Industries have been thoroughly restructured, and the last coal was mined in the city in 1994. However, remnants of the city's industrial past are visible in the Lower Vítkovice area, a former coal mining, coke production and ironworks complex in the city centre which retains its historic industrial architecture. Lower Vítkovice has applied for inclusion in the UNESCO World Heritage List.

Ostrava is home to various cultural facilities including theatres and galleries. Various cultural and sporting events take place in Ostrava throughout the year, including the Colours of Ostrava music festival, the Janáček May classical music festival, the Summer Shakespeare Festival and NATO Days. Ostrava is home to two public universities: the Technical University of Ostrava and the University of Ostrava. In 2014 Ostrava was a European City of Sport. The city co-hosted (with Prague) the Ice Hockey World Championships in 2004, 2015, and 2024.

== Administrative division ==
Self-governing boroughs of Ostrava

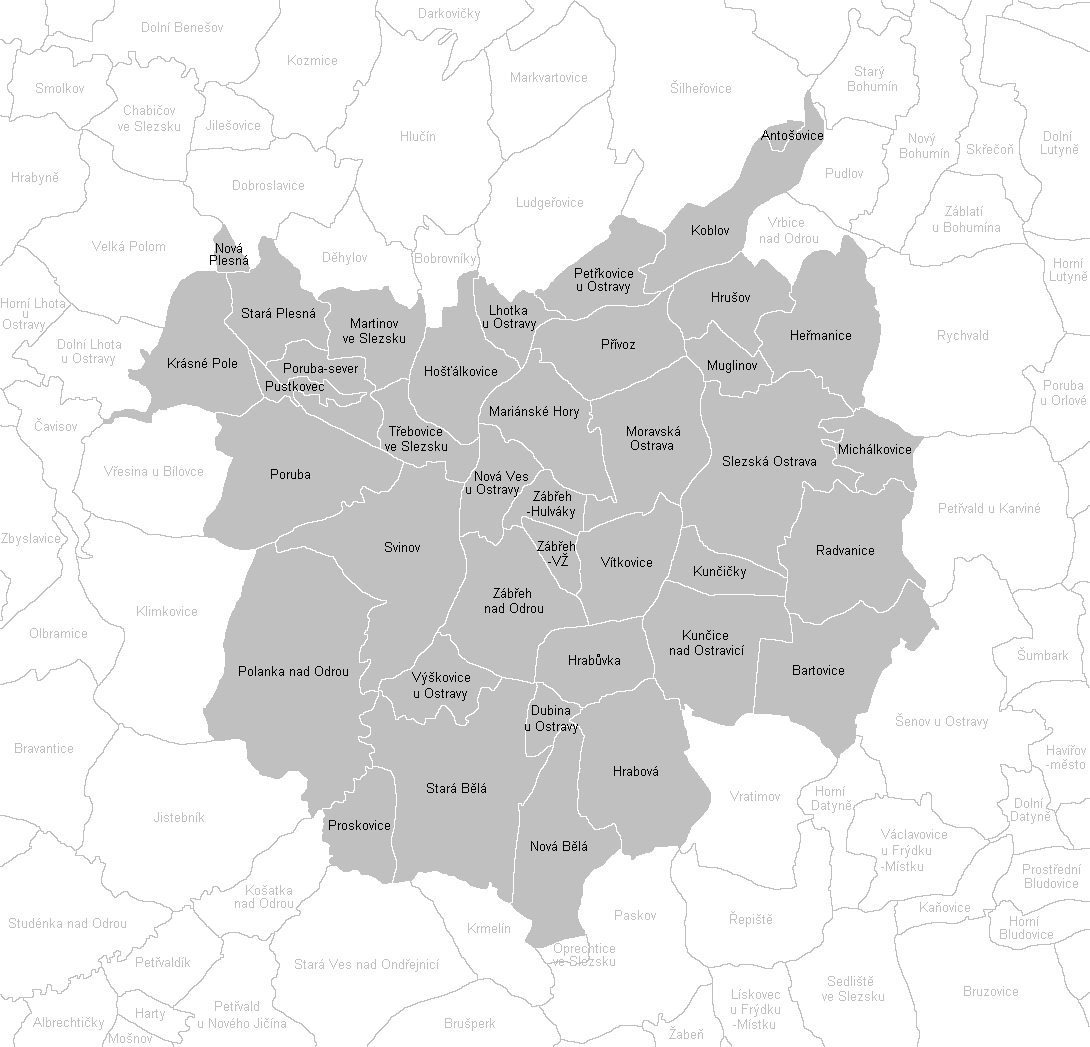
Municipal parts of Ostrava

On 14 September 1990, Ostrava's City Authority approved the division of the city into 22 boroughs, effective 24 November that year. On 1 January 1994, Plesná separated from Poruba and became a separate borough. Since then, the city has been divided into 23 self-governing boroughs. In addition, Ostrava is divided into 37 municipal parts, 18 of them identically defined as boroughs (in brackets population according to the 2021 census):

- Hošťálkovice (1,683)
- Hrabová (3,758)
- Krásné Pole (2,652)
- Lhotka (1,333)
- Mariánské Hory a Hulváky (11,629)
  - Mariánské Hory (10,715)
  - Hulváky (914)
- Martinov (1,129)
- Michálkovice (3,245)
- Moravská Ostrava a Přívoz (37,855)
  - Moravská Ostrava (33,958)
  - Přívoz (3,897)
- Nová Bělá (2,207)
- Nová Ves (747)
- Ostrava-Jih (96,871)
  - Bělský Les (7,072)
  - Dubina (12,589)
  - Hrabůvka (28,118)
  - Výškovice (12,821)
  - Zábřeh (36,271)
- Petřkovice (3,140)
- Plesná (1,496)
- Polanka nad Odrou (4,898)
- Poruba (61,939)
- Proskovice (1,204)
- Pustkovec (1,312)
- Radvanice a Bartovice (6,189)
  - Radvanice (4,182)
  - Bartovice (2,007)
- Slezská Ostrava (21,375)
  - Slezská Ostrava (7,853)
  - Antošovice (252)
  - Heřmanice (3,010)
  - Hrušov (2,269)
  - Koblov (1,348)
  - Kunčice (895)
  - Kunčičky (1,530)
  - Muglinov (4,218)
- Stará Bělá (3,980)
- Svinov (4,257)
- Třebovice (1,828)
- Vítkovice (7,653)

== Symbols and logo ==
=== Coat of arms ===
The city's coat of arms features a blue shield with a rearing silver horse standing on a green lawn. The horse wears a golden saddle and a red coverlet. At the top right of the shield there is a golden rose with green leaves and a red core. The horse in the coat of arms wears no bridle. The oldest known depiction of this coat of arms is on a seal dating from 1426. The first coloured version dates from 1728. The horse is often interpreted as a symbol of Ostrava's position on a major trade route, or as a figure taken from the coat of arms of Ostrava's first vogt (reeve), while the golden rose probably comes from the family coat of arms of the bishop of Olomouc Stanislav I Thurzo. This explanation is supported by most modern literature.

Another theory suggests that the bishop granted Ostrava the right to use the horse on its coat of arms out of gratitude for the assistance that the town provided to the people of the bishop's estate in Hukvaldy when the estate was being looted and pillaged. Apparently the help came so quickly that the pillagers did not have time to attach bridles to their horses before making their escape. There is also a legend which tells of a siege of Ostrava during which the besieged townspeople released unbridled horses to run in circles around the town. This is said to have confused the attacking armies so much that they fled.

=== Marketing logo ===
In 2008, Ostrava's new marketing logo was unveiled. Designed by Studio Najbrt, the logo "OSTRAVA!!!" is used in public presentations of the city, both in the Czech Republic and abroad. The three exclamation marks are meant to symbolise the dynamism, energy and self-confidence of Ostrava and its people. The light blue colour of the city's name is based on the heraldic tradition, while the exclamation marks are a contrasting darker blue.

== History ==
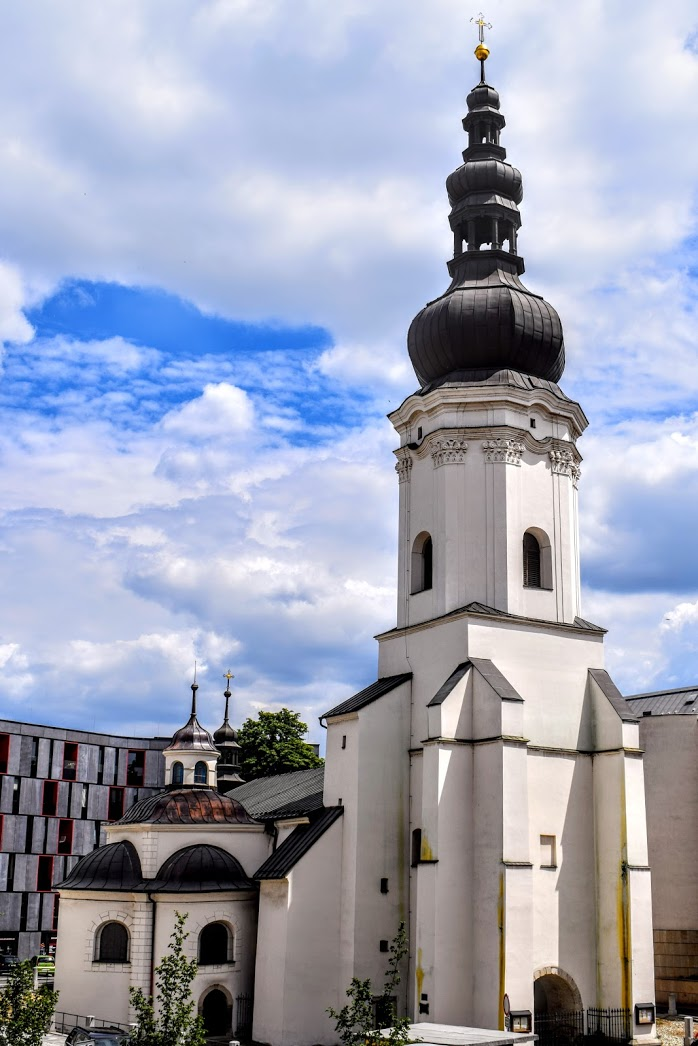
Church of St. Wenceslaus, one of the oldest and most important monuments of Ostrava

The first written mention of Slezská Ostrava (Silesian Ostrava) dates from 1229, when it was described as a settlement. The first mention of Moravian Ostrava (Moravská Ostrava) in 1267 describes it as a township. Ostrava grew on the banks of the Ostrá River (now the Ostravice) from which it took its name. The river still divides the city into two main parts: Moravian Ostrava (Moravská Ostrava) and Silesian Ostrava (Slezská Ostrava). The settlement occupied a strategic position on the border between the two historic provinces of Moravia and Silesia and on the ancient trade route from the Baltic Sea to the Adriatic Sea known as the Amber Road. Its location helped the town to grow and flourish.

However, Ostrava began to decline in importance after the Thirty Years' War, and it was occupied by Danish forces in 1626, and by Swedish forces from 1642 to 1650.

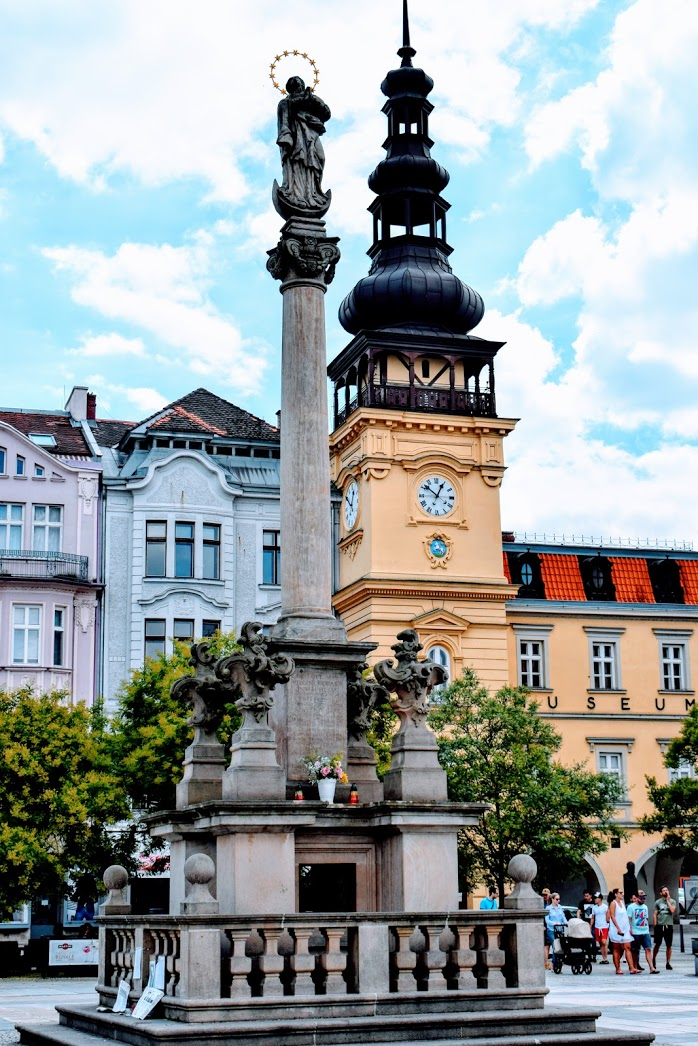
Marian Column (1702) at Masarykovo náměstí

A turning point in Ostrava's history came in 1763 with the discovery of extensive deposits of high-quality bituminous coal on the Silesian bank of the Ostravice River. In 1828, the owner of the local estates, Rudolf Jan, the archbishop of Olomouc, established an ironworks, which was named after him as the Rudolfshütte. Later, the ironworks passed into the ownership of the Rothschild family and became known as the Vítkovice Ironworks. The company became the driving force behind Ostrava's industrial boom. By the second half of the 20th century, the city was nicknamed the country's "steel heart".

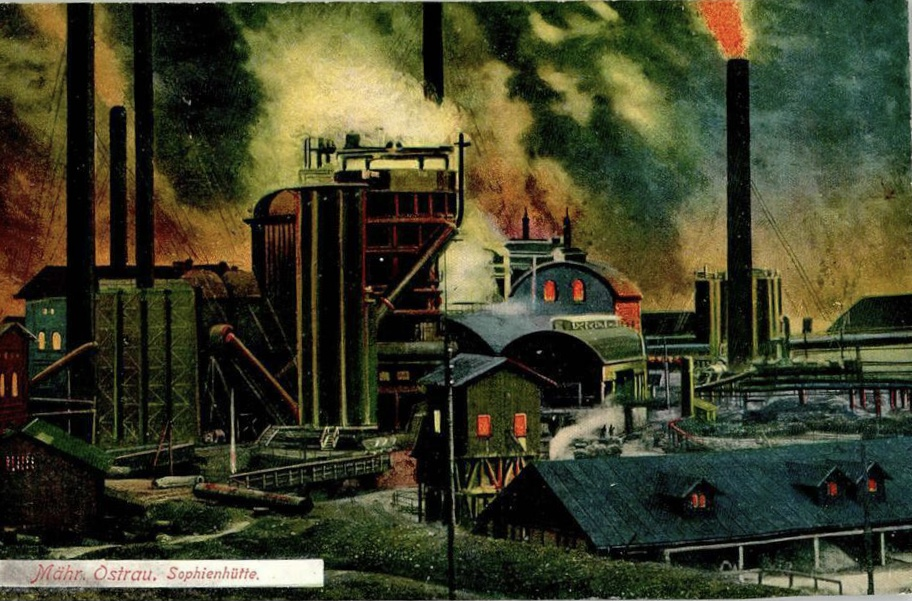
The Sophienhütte ironworks in c. 1910

In 1931 the Jewish community in Ostrava numbered 6,865 (5.4% of the population). About 8,000 Jews from the Ostrava district were murdered in the Holocaust during the German occupation in World War II. The Nisko Plan included the first deportation train transports of 1,301 Jews from Ostrava on 17 and 26 October 1939. In 1994, a Holocaust memorial to the Jewish victims of Ostrava was built in Milada Horáková Park. During World War II, the city was occupied by Germany. The occupiers operated a Gestapo prison in the city, and several forced labour camps, including three labour "education" camps, located in Moravská Ostrava, Vítkovice, and Kunčice, and the E21 subcamp of the Stalag VIII-B/344 prisoner-of-war camp in the present-day district of Petřkovice.

After the war, the city's German-speaking population were expelled in accordance with the Potsdam Agreement. 231 German-speaking citizens were killed in a massacre at an internment camp, known as the Hanke Lager Massacres. The liberation of Ostrava by the Red Army led to the city entering its greatest period of expansion. Initially, the new housing projects were on a relatively-small scale focusing on the Poruba district and featuring architecture in the Socialist realism style. Later, however, the authorities built larger-scale developments of prefabricated apartment blocks in Poruba and created a series of satellite estates to the south of the city (Ostrava-Jih). The city centre was gradually depopulated, and its people were moved out to the suburbs, as part of a long-term plan to destroy the city centre entirely and to turn the land over to coal mining.

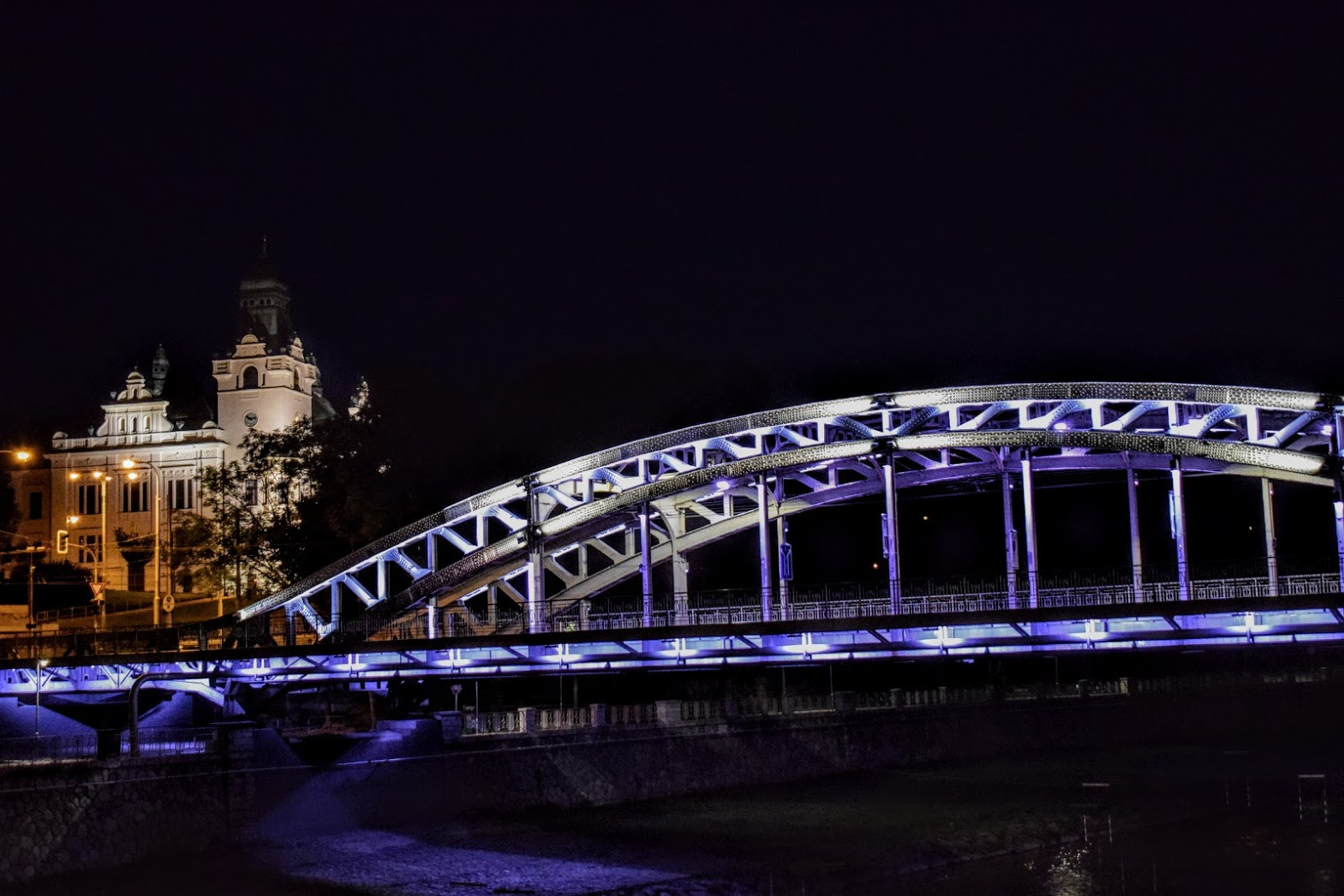
Miloš Sýkora Bridge over the Ostravice River and Silesian Ostrava Town Hall

The 1990s brought a rapid decline in the city's traditional industrial sectors: iron, steel, chemicals and coal mining. The last coal was mined on 30 June 1994, which was accompanied by major investments to rectify ecological damage done by decades of heavy industry. The projects ultimately brought major improvements in the city's environment and quality of life. Ostrava became an important tourist centre that offered easy access to the nearby Hrubý Jeseník and Moravian-Silesian Beskids mountains.

As well as hundreds of hectares of recultivated former mining land, the city also has numerous natural landscape features of interest, many of which are protected nature reserves. They include the Polanský les Nature Reserve and the Polanská niva National Nature Reserve, both of which form part of the Poodří Protected Landscape Area.

A rare geological feature found in the city is the granite erratic boulders. Originally from Scandinavia, they were left behind after the last ice age, when the ice sheets retreated. Another feature is the Ema slag heap, an artificial hill made of mining waste (slag) that offers panoramic views. The waste is still burning deep beneath the surface, which gives the slag-heap its own microclimate.

On 10 December 2019, a shooting at a hospital in Ostrava left eight people dead, including the perpetrator.

== Geography ==
Ostrava is located about 270 kilometres (170 mi) east of Prague. It lies mostly in the Ostrava Basin lowland, only the southwestern part of the municipal territory extends into the Moravian Gate. Ostrava is mostly low-lying, with a highest point of 280 m (920 ft) above sea level. The city is situated at the meeting point of four rivers: Oder, Opava, Ostravice and Lučina. It differs from most neighbouring regions by the high concentration of industry, dense population and the geographical conditions of the Ostrava Basin. The Poodří Protected Landscape Area extends to the city's territory in the southwest.

Ostrava is 20.5 km across from north to south (Antošovice–Nová Bělá), and 20.1 km across from east to west (Bartovice–Krásné Pole).

=== Climate ===
Ostrava has an oceanic (Köppen: Cfb) or humid continental (Dfb) climate, according with the isotherm 0 °C/-3 °C. The climate features warm, humid summers and moderately cold winters, with an average annual temperature of 10.2 °C (50.4 °F) (January: −1.2 °C (29.8 °F) July: 23.5 °C (74.3 °F)) and average annual precipitation of 580 mm.

Climate data for Ostrava (Leoš Janáček Airport Ostrava, 1991−2020 normals, extremes 1960−present)
Month	Jan	Feb	Mar	Apr	May	Jun	Jul	Aug	Sep	Oct	Nov	Dec	Year
Record high °C (°F)	14.2 (57.6)	17.3 (63.1)	23.3 (73.9)	29.0 (84.2)	31.9 (89.4)	35.2 (95.4)	36.7 (98.1)	36.9 (98.4)	33.7 (92.7)	26.2 (79.2)	22.5 (72.5)	16.7 (62.1)	36.9 (98.4)
Mean daily maximum °C (°F)	1.7 (35.1)	3.8 (38.8)	8.5 (47.3)	15.1 (59.2)	19.6 (67.3)	23.2 (73.8)	25.4 (77.7)	25.3 (77.5)	19.7 (67.5)	14.0 (57.2)	8.1 (46.6)	2.8 (37.0)	13.9 (57.0)
Daily mean °C (°F)	−0.6 (30.9)	0.7 (33.3)	4.3 (39.7)	9.7 (49.5)	14.2 (57.6)	18.1 (64.6)	19.9 (67.8)	19.4 (66.9)	14.4 (57.9)	9.6 (49.3)	5.1 (41.2)	0.6 (33.1)	9.6 (49.3)
Mean daily minimum °C (°F)	−3.7 (25.3)	−3.0 (26.6)	−0.2 (31.6)	3.8 (38.8)	8.2 (46.8)	12.2 (54.0)	13.9 (57.0)	13.5 (56.3)	9.4 (48.9)	5.6 (42.1)	2.0 (35.6)	−2.1 (28.2)	5.0 (41.0)
Record low °C (°F)	−29.7 (−21.5)	−27.3 (−17.1)	−25.8 (−14.4)	−8.3 (17.1)	−3.4 (25.9)	1.1 (34.0)	4.1 (39.4)	2.4 (36.3)	−3.2 (26.2)	−7.6 (18.3)	−18.7 (−1.7)	−25.8 (−14.4)	−29.7 (−21.5)
Average precipitation mm (inches)	26.2 (1.03)	25.9 (1.02)	33.9 (1.33)	44.1 (1.74)	83.9 (3.30)	96.0 (3.78)	96.7 (3.81)	69.2 (2.72)	74.2 (2.92)	51.7 (2.04)	39.7 (1.56)	31.5 (1.24)	672.9 (26.49)
Average snowfall cm (inches)	17.3 (6.8)	16.7 (6.6)	8.1 (3.2)	2.5 (1.0)	0.0 (0.0)	0.0 (0.0)	0.0 (0.0)	0.0 (0.0)	0.0 (0.0)	0.3 (0.1)	5.7 (2.2)	15.6 (6.1)	66.2 (26.1)
Average precipitation days (≥ 1.0 mm)	6.7	6.6	7.6	7.6	10.5	10.3	10.6	8.7	8.8	7.9	7.1	7.1	99.5
Average relative humidity (%)	84.3	80.7	75.4	68.9	71.7	71.8	70.2	72.1	78.1	81.8	84.3	85.3	77.0
Average dew point °C (°F)	−5.0 (23.0)	−3.7 (25.3)	−0.9 (30.4)	2.7 (36.9)	8.0 (46.4)	11.3 (52.3)	12.5 (54.5)	12.3 (54.1)	9.6 (49.3)	5.3 (41.5)	1.0 (33.8)	−2.8 (27.0)	4.2 (39.5)
Mean monthly sunshine hours	51.2	71.3	121.6	183.0	213.3	224.4	242.0	237.5	160.6	111.5	60.5	45.5	1,722.2
Source 1: NOAA (dew point 1961–1990)
Source 2: Czech Hydrometeorological Institute (snowfall and humidity 1991–2020, extremes)

== Demographics ==
Historical population

Year	Pop.	±%
1869	38,598	—
1880	56,128	+45.4%
1890	84,492	+50.5%
1900	144,550	+71.1%
1910	186,084	+28.7%

Year	Pop.	±%
1921	198,438	+6.6%
1930	219,528	+10.6%
1950	215,791	−1.7%
1961	254,297	+17.8%
1970	297,171	+16.9%

Year	Pop.	±%
1980	322,073	+8.4%
1991	327,371	+1.6%
2001	316,744	−3.2%
2011	296,224	−6.5%
2021	282,450	−4.6%

Source: Censuses

== Transport ==
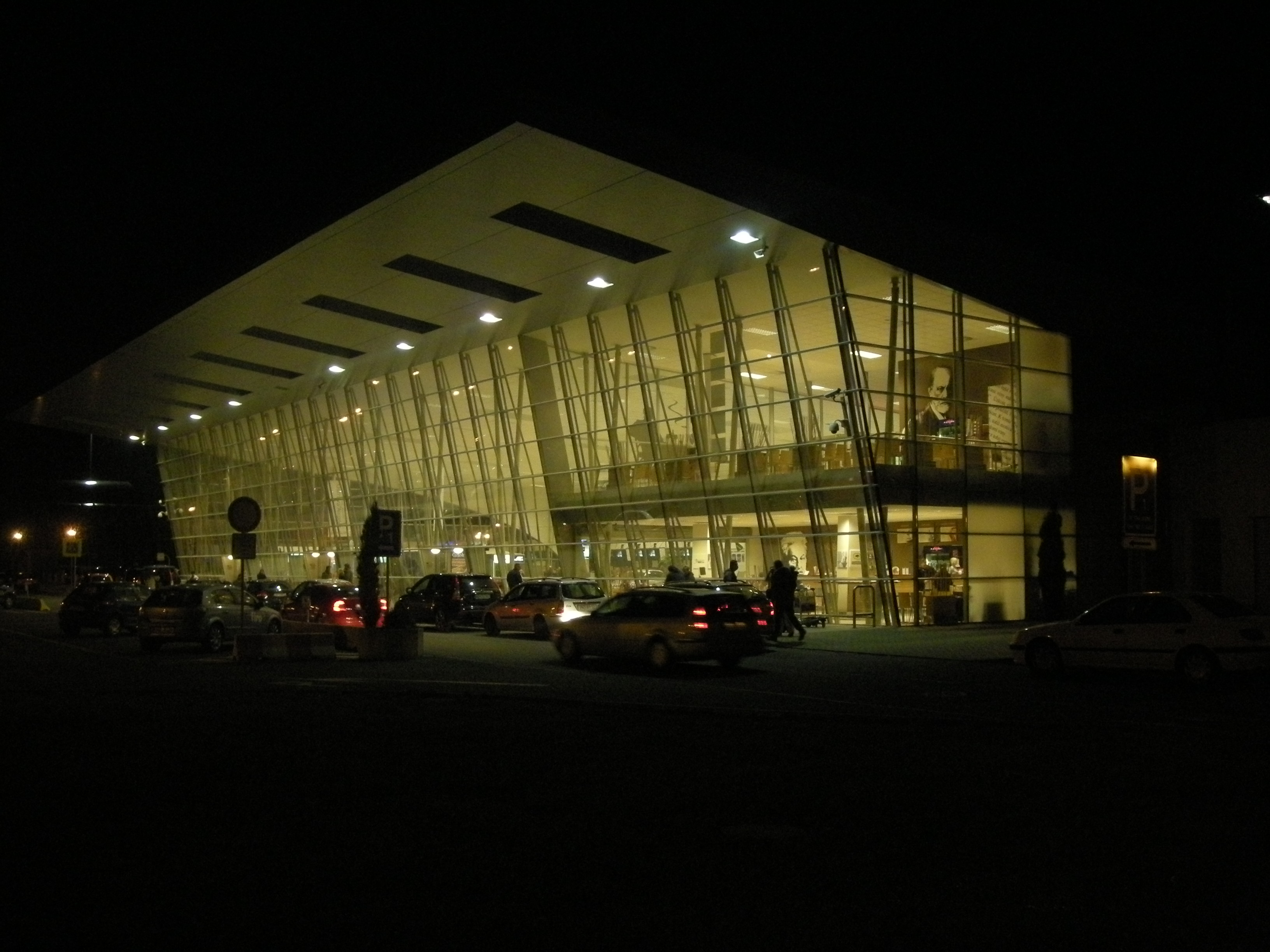
Leoš Janáček Airport Ostrava

Ostrava is the transport and logistics hub of the north-eastern part of the Czech Republic, located close to the borders with Slovakia and Poland, and with an airport and highway connection nearby.

=== Air ===
25 km (16 mi) south of the city centre is an international airport, Leoš Janáček Airport Ostrava, which links the city with several European destinations (IATA code: OSR; ICAO code: LKMT). It is the first airport in the Czech Republic to have its own rail link, which opened in 2015.

=== Roads ===
The road infrastructure of the region is centred on the D1 motorway, which runs from Prague via Brno and Ostrava into Poland. Ostrava is 360 km (220 mi) from Prague by motorway, 170 km (110 mi) from Brno, 90 km (56 mi) from the Polish city of Katowice, and 310 km (190 mi) from Vienna. Other major roads which pass through Ostrava are the Class I roads 11, 56, 58 and 59.

=== Public transport ===
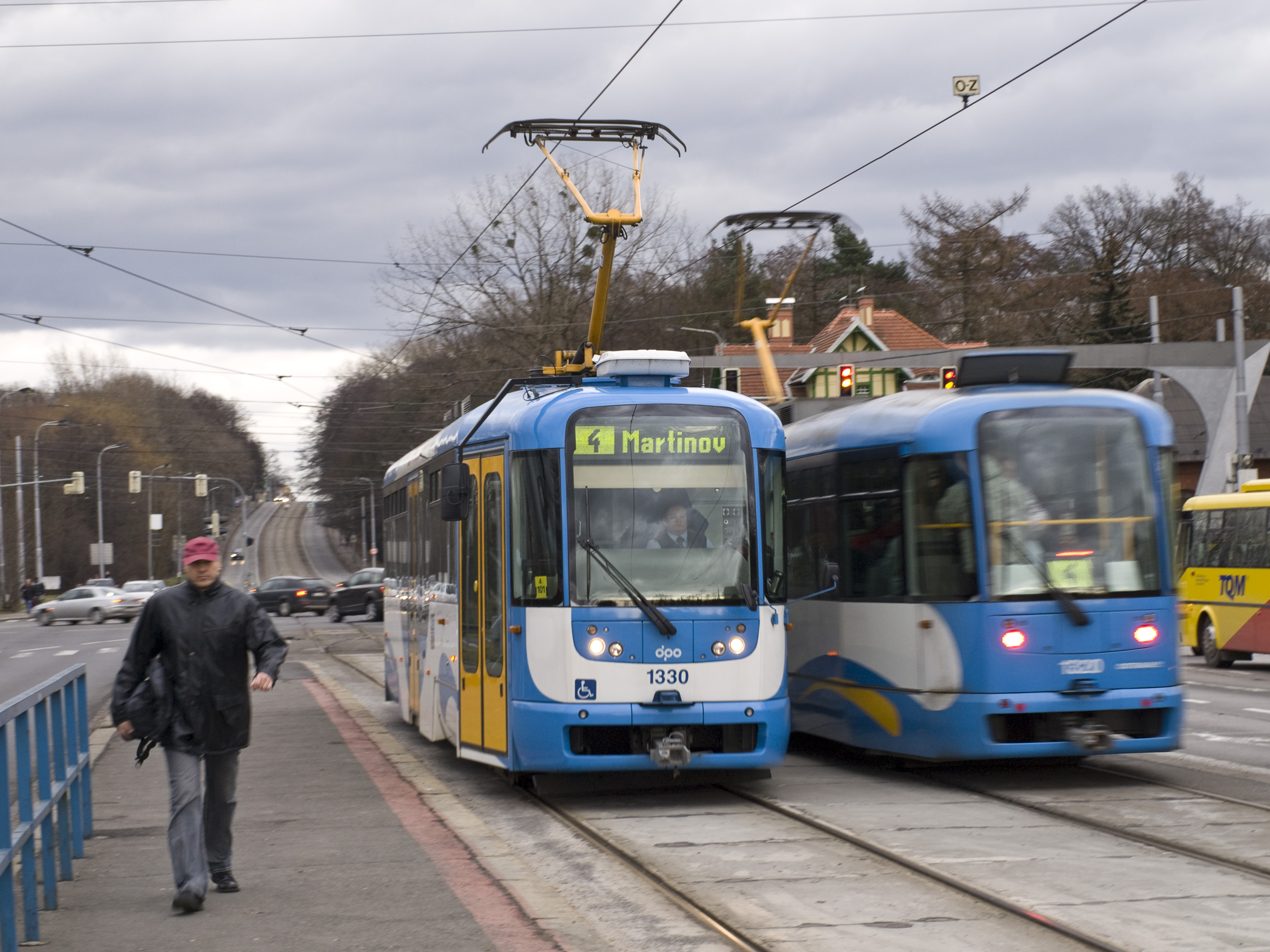
Ostrava trams in their traditional blue and white livery at the "Nová Ves vodárna" stop

The city has a dense public transport network consisting of trams, buses and trolleybuses. The first trams, introduced in 1894, were powered by steam engines. The network was rapidly expanded, and in 1901 it was electrified. New tram lines were built mainly to the south and east of the city centre, where they would not have to cross the narrow-gauge railways linking Ostrava with Karviná and Bohumín.

Trolleybuses were introduced in 1952, as in other Czech towns and cities after World War II. Initially there was one trolleybus route which encircled the city centre. The network was gradually expanded in the 1950s and 60s, replacing the narrow-gauge railways. A route to the Fifejdy housing estate was built in the late 1970s. The last expansion of the trolleybus network came in the mid-2010s, when a route was built out to the new terminal in Hranečník. 17 tram lines currently operate in Ostrava. There are 52 bus lines and 14 trolleybus lines.

=== Rail ===
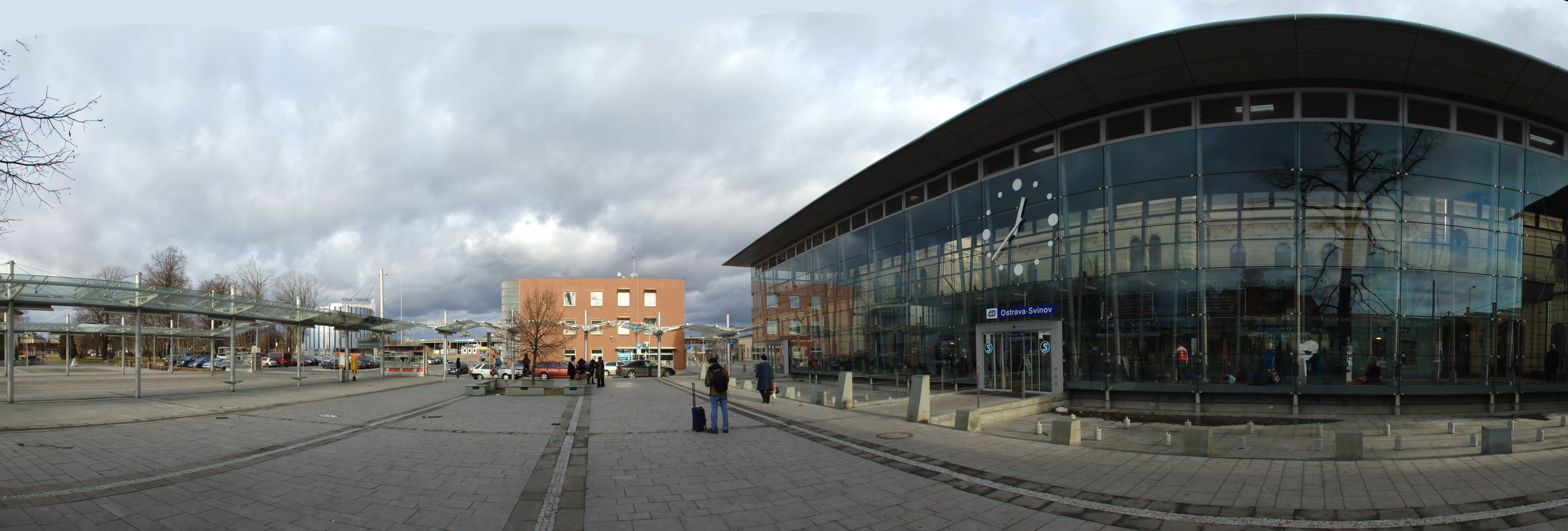
Railway station Ostrava-Svinov

Ostrava is also a major railway hub, sited on Railway Corridors II and III and serving as an important centre for cargo and passenger transport between the Czech Republic, Poland and Slovakia. The city's largest railway stations are the main station (Ostrava hl.n.) and Ostrava-Svinov. These stations are important railway junctions. The main line linking Ostrava with Olomouc, Pardubice and Prague is served by three railway companies: České dráhy, RegioJet and LEO Express.

== Environment ==
Ostrava's high concentration of heavy industry created various environmental problems in the city, particularly in relation to air quality. Measurements performed by the Czech Hydrometeorological Institute show that levels of atmospheric benzopyrene and dust particles are among the highest in the country.

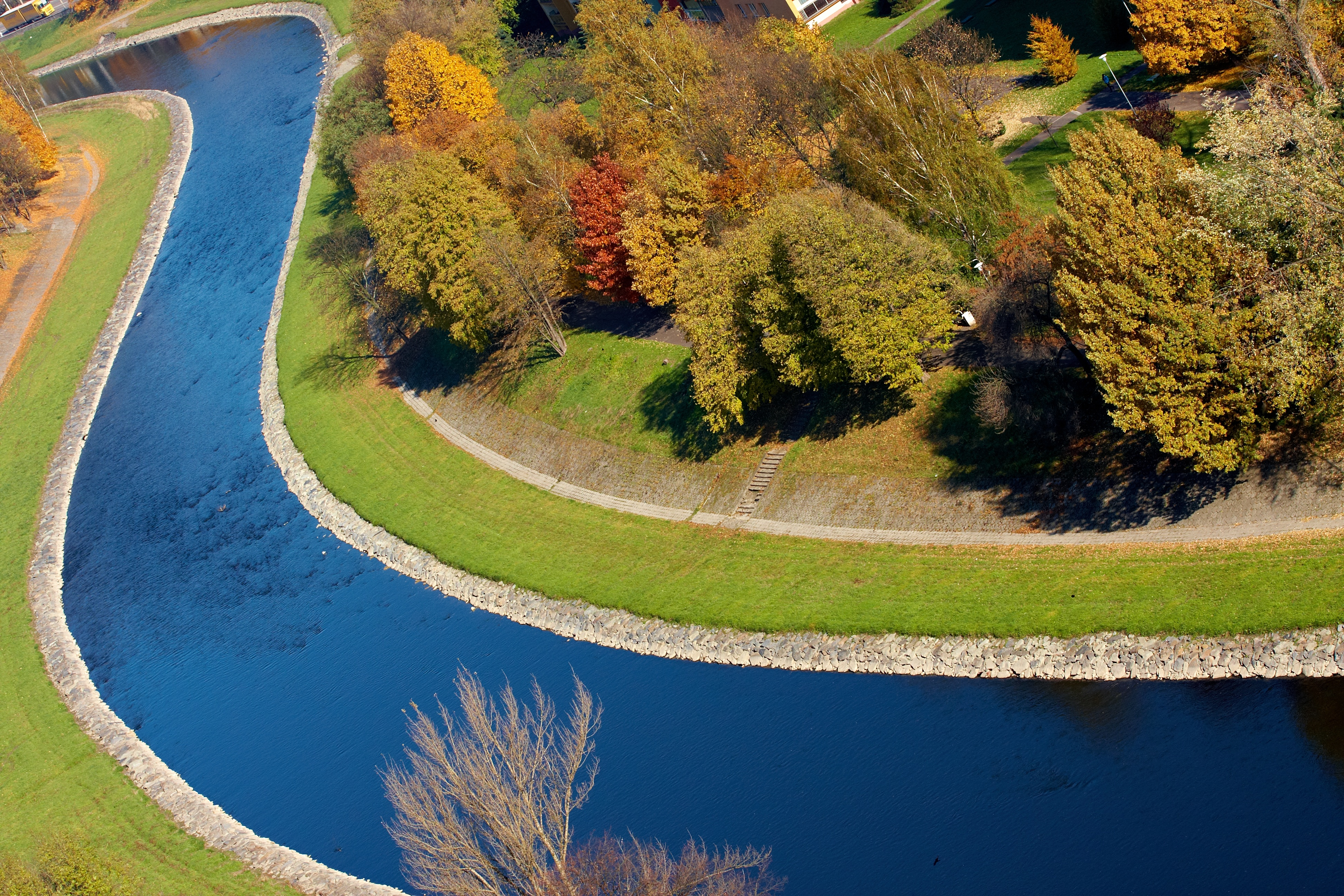
The Ostravice River

Although Ostrava still has to contend with environmental issues, the situation has improved over time. In 2015 ArcelorMittal, then one of the biggest polluters in the region, implemented 14 major ecological investment projects worth CZK 3 billion. One new installation filters out 61 tonnes of dust per year. The City of Ostrava is also involved in a range of projects focusing on environmental improvements, including a web portal, www.zdravaova.cz, which enables citizens to monitor current air quality indicators, and a project funding short "health breaks" for children from high-risk areas.

One of the most pressing environmental problems currently facing the city concerns the oil lagoons at the site of the former Ostramo chemical plant. In 1996 the Czech government took over the site and drew up plans for a cleanup. The state-owned company Diamo was created to implement these plans. The situation has been the subject of government-level discussions, and Finance Minister Andrej Babiš visited Ostrava in March 2015.

Air quality in Ostrava is currently very poor, with high concentrations of benzopyrene. The pollution is so serious that it has been described in folklore; local people refer to "Černá Ostrava" (Black Ostrava) and have several songs about it.

== Culture ==
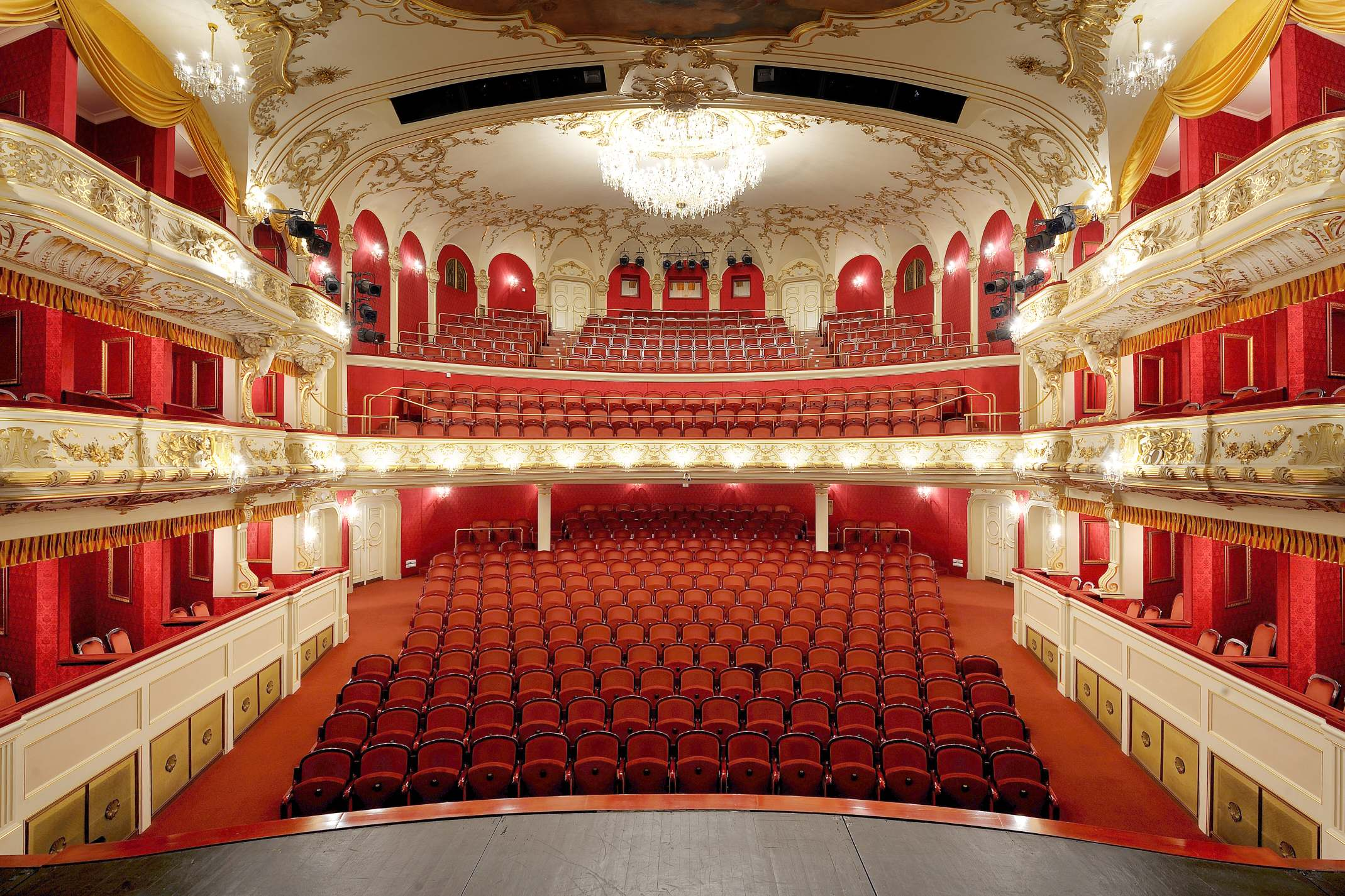
Inside the Antonín Dvořák Theatre

=== Performing arts ===
Ostrava has four permanent theatres: the National Moravian-Silesian Theatre (with two permanent venues, the Antonín Dvořák Theatre and the Jiří Myron Theatre), the Petr Bezruč Theatre, the Aréna Chamber Theatre and the Ostrava Puppet Theatre – which hosts the international Spectaculo Interesse festival every odd-numbered year and the Theatre Without Barriers festival every even-numbered year.

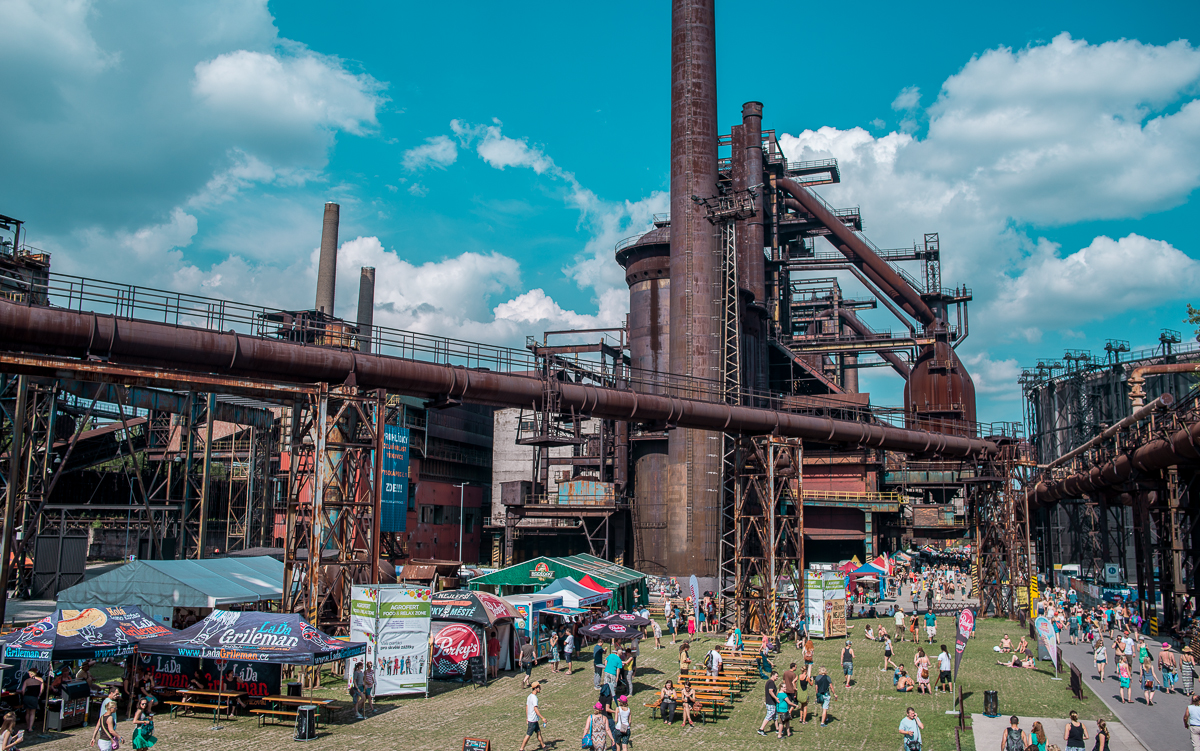
Colours of Ostrava

Ostrava is home to the Janáček Philharmonic Orchestra, and hosts a number of international annual or biennial classical music festivals, including Janáček May, the St Wenceslaus Music Festival and the Ostrava Days new music festival. Since 2002 Ostrava has been the venue for the annual multi-genre music festival Colours of Ostrava, which features an international line-up of artists and attracts crowds of tens of thousands. The city is also host to Beats For Love, an electronic dance music festival held at the Dolní Vítkovice industrial complex.

Other cultural events in Ostrava include the film and theatre festivals One World, Ostrava Camera Eye (Czech: Ostrava Kamera Oko), the International Outdoor Films Festival, and the Summer Shakespeare Festival (held on an outdoor stage at the Silesian Ostrava Castle). Folklore festivals include the Harmony (Czech: Souznění) international festival of Advent and Christmas traditions and crafts, Folklore Without Borders, and the Irish Cultural Festival.

=== Museums and galleries ===
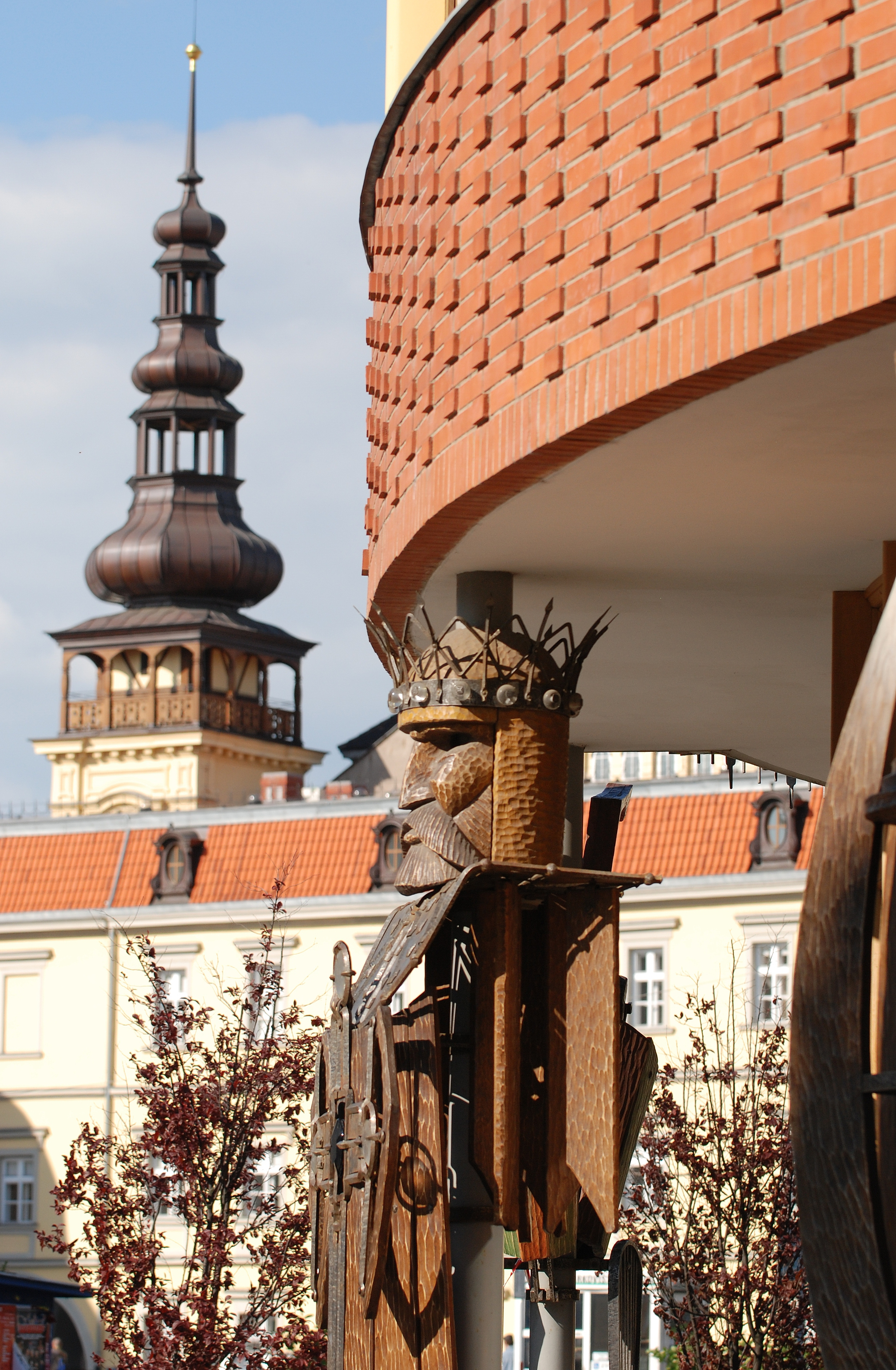
Ostrava Puppet Theatre

Ostrava has several museums and galleries:

- The Ostrava City Museum, a museum located in the 16th-century Old City Hall building on the main central square, housing permanent exhibitions on the city's history, landscape and people.
- The Ostrava Science and Technology Centre, an interactive museum about the world of technology aimed at all ages, including simulators for driving a train, flying a plane, or working as a steelworker or an astronaut. The Science and Technology Centre comprises two parts: the Small World of Technology, and the Large World of Technology (14,000 m2), which is divided into four different "worlds" within one building.
- The Toy Museum, a toy museum including examples from over 60 countries, including some toys from the mid-19th century.
- The Railway Museum, featuring model trains, and a collection of original documents from the period of the Austro-Hungarian Empire.
- The Brewery Museum, focused on the history and technology of brewing.
- The Firefighting Museum, housed in an Art Nouveau building in the Přívoz district previously used as a fire station. The exhibition includes a video showing firefighting techniques.
- Keltička's Forge Museum, a permanent exhibition of blacksmithing and coal mining. The building used to be the home of a blacksmith named Keltička (commemorated in a small memorial outside the building). According to the local legend it was Keltička who first discovered Ostrava's coal deposits. The museum maps the early beginnings of Ostrava's coal mining industry, including a collection of miners' helmets and lamps from the 17th century and a range of other exhibits.
- The Professor F. Pošepný Geology Pavilion, which includes over 15,000 exhibits of minerals, rocks and fossils.
- The House of Art (Czech: Dům umění), a gallery of fine art housed in a building from the early 20th century.
- The PLATO (Ostrava City Gallery), an exhibition space with no permanent collections, which provides a space for exhibitions of contemporary Czech and international art.
- The Zither Museum, a collection featuring examples of the musical instrument.
- The Mining Museum at Landek Park, featuring a guided tour of the former Anselm coal mine with a guide who was a miner there, including a descent into a simulated mine tunnel.
- The Mill Museum, a museum of mills and milling in the Ostrava region.
- The Michal Colliery museum, a museum in a former coal mine presenting the city's history of mining. The guided tour leads along the same route taken by the miners when they started their shift, but it is not possible for visitors to the museum to go underground. The museum is a National Cultural Monument.
- Ostrava Planetárium

== Sights ==
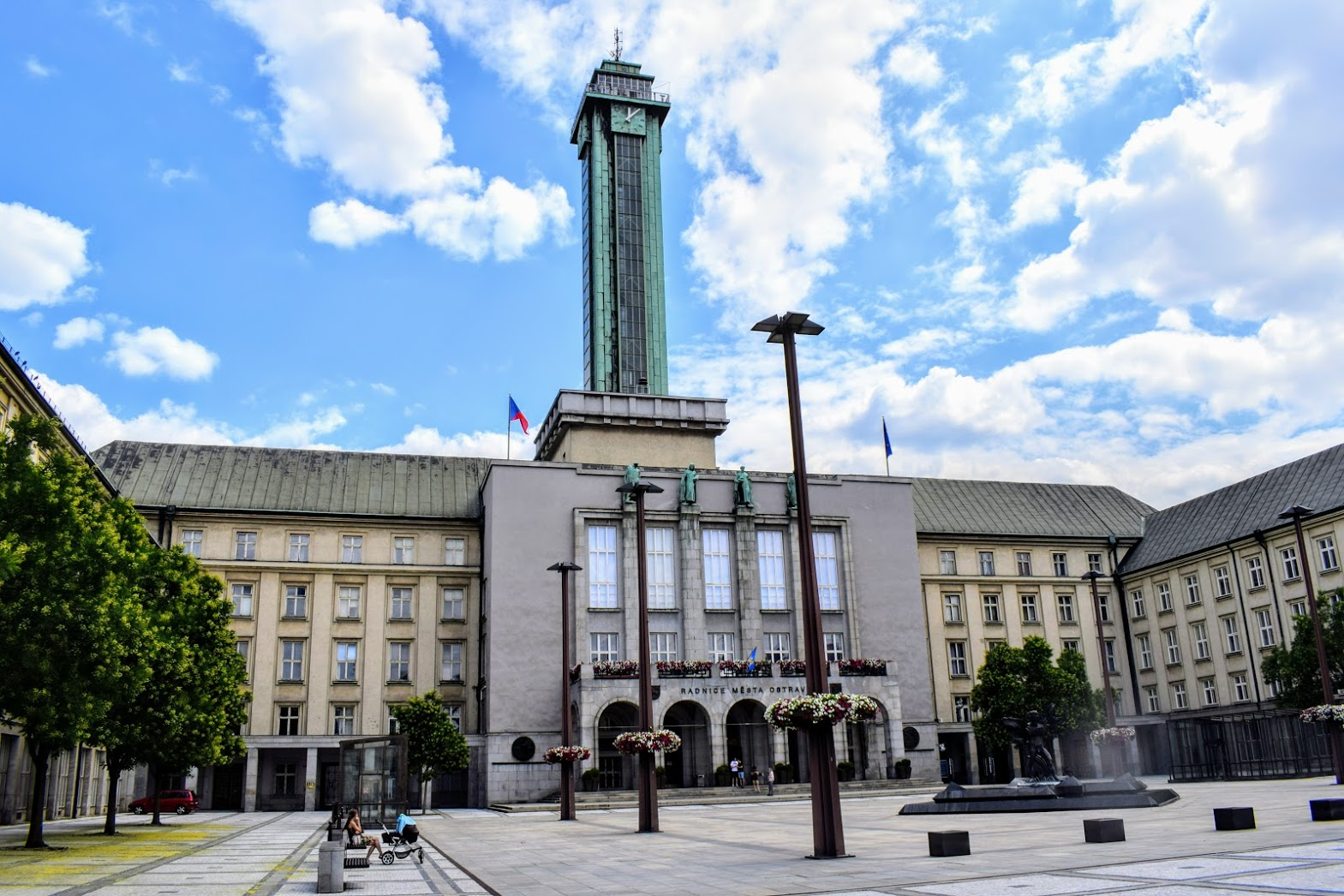
- New City Hall
  Ostrava's New City Hall has the tallest tower of any city hall in the Czech Republic, with a viewing platform 73 metres above ground providing a panoramic view of the city.
- Komenského Gardens is a park in the city centre named after the Renaissance-era Czech writer and educator John Amos Comenius, and the site of a statue honouring the Soviet soldiers who liberated Ostrava in 1945.
- The fairytale clock at Ostrava's Puppet Theatre features figurines which perform a show at two-hour intervals from 8 a.m. to 8 p.m. The performance lasts two minutes. It depicts a battle between Kasper the clown and the Grim Reaper, and it also features four other characters – an angel, a king, a queen, and a devil.
- The Silesian Ostrava Castle, close to Masaryk Square, once stood on higher ground, but over time it has sunk by 16 metres due to mine tunnels collapsing underneath it. The castle is located at the confluence of the Lučina and Ostravice rivers. The castle is the venue for the summer Shakespeare festival, among other events.
- Stodolní Street is the city's entertainment district, with more than 60 bars, clubs, restaurants and cafés.
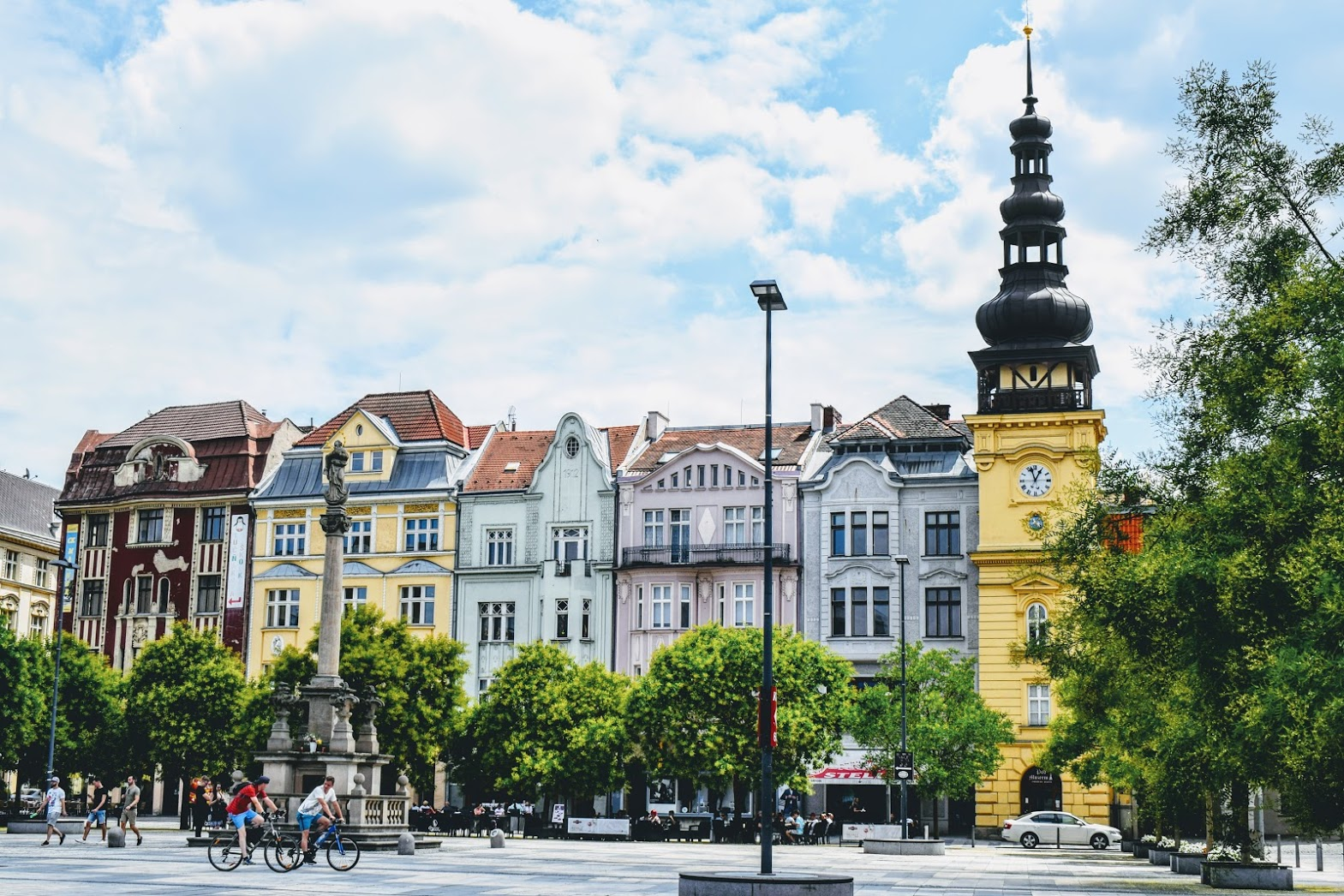
- Masaryk Square
  Masaryk Square is located in Ostrava's historical centre and has a plague column with a figure of the Virgin Mary (1702) and a Baroque statue of Saint Florian, the patron saint of firefighters. There is a series of commemorative paving stones that starts outside the Laso shopping mall, as well as the Schönhof building, known as "the house with seven doors", and the Reisz building designed by the Viennese architect Wunibald Deininger.
- The Karolina Triple Hall (Czech: Trojhalí) is an urban space located next to the Forum Nová Karolina shopping mall. These large historic buildings – formerly part of the Karolina coking plant – have been transformed by the architect Josef Pleskot into a new venue for sports, entertainment and culture.
- Ostrava Zoo is the second largest zoo in the Czech Republic and home to more than 400 different species of animals. In 2014 a new safari park was built, and in 2015 the zoo opened a new pavilion illustrating the process of evolution.
- Lower Vítkovice preserves a historic blast furnace and has a glass elevator to the newly built viewing platform at the top, with panoramic views of Ostrava and the surrounding countryside. There are guided tours describing Vítkovice's history. The blast furnace, the former power station, compressor hall and coal mine are open to the public. The former gas holder has been repurposed into a multi-functional hall called the Gong.
- Ema slag-heap, on the right bank of the Ostravice, is an artificial hill created by piling up slag, or waste material from coal mines. Its top is 315 metres (1,033 ft) above sea level. It has a subtropical micro-climate because the waste material is still burning deep beneath the surface. White smoke comes out of cracks in the ground. Snow never settles here, and flowers grow all year round. A yellow-marked hiking path leads to the top, from where there are panoramic views of the city.

=== Architecture ===
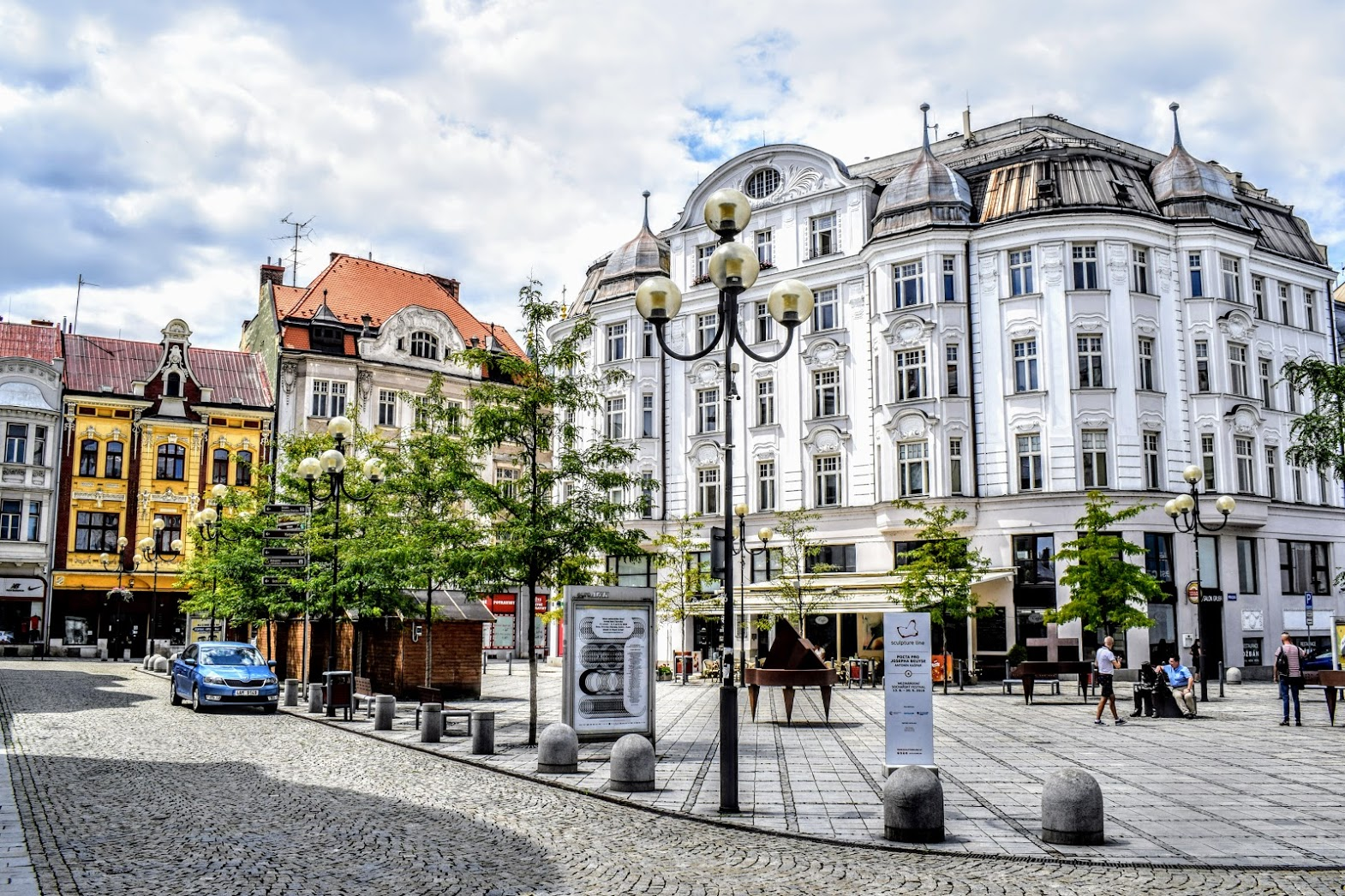
Jirásek Square, former chicken market (kuří rynek), in Moravská Ostrava

There are four urban monument zones in Ostrava – Moravská Ostrava (the historic centre), Ostrava-Poruba, Ostrava-Přívoz, and Ostrava-Vítkovice. Much of Ostrava's architectural heritage is in the city centre. The most notable structures are theatres, banks, department stores and other public buildings dating from the turn of the 20th century, at the time of Ostrava's greatest boom. The central Masaryk Square, named after the first President of Czechoslovakia Tomáš Garrigue Masaryk, features the historic old city hall building and a Marian plague column from 1702. Nearby Smetanovo Square features the Antonín Dvořák Theatre and the Functionalist Knihcentrum bookstore. To the west are a series of grand, imposing bank buildings and the Elektra Palace on Nádražní Street, while to the north is the New City Hall with its landmark viewing tower, overlooking the large open space of Prokeš Square.

The city centre also has two notable religious buildings – the 13th-century Church of St. Wenceslaus and the Cathedral of the Divine Saviour, the second largest church in Moravia and Czech Silesia. Ostrava's central district contains works by architects including Karel Kotas, Josef Gočár, Ernst Korner and Alexander Graf.

Poruba is a large district of Ostrava in the western part of the conurbation, noted for its distinctive 1950s Socialist realist architecture. Inspired by the grandiose buildings of Soviet cities, Poruba also incorporates historical pastiche features drawing on ancient, Renaissance and Classicist models. The main entrance to the part of Poruba built at this time is through a grand triumphal arch.

The Vítkovice district was for several decades the centre of the local iron and steel industry. The influx of workers led the company to build housing for its employees, plus civic amenities, a town hall and a church. The historic parts of the district are built in the company's distinctive style featuring red-brick façades.

Other districts of the city with a distinctive architectural heritage include Přívoz (with its grand Art Nouveau buildings) and the Jubilee housing development (Czech: Jubilejní kolonie) in Hrabůvka, built as a workers' housing complex in the 1920s.

=== Churches ===
- Lutheran Church of Christ (Ostrava)
- Church of St. Anne (Ostrava)
- Church of St. Bartholomew (Ostrava)
- Church of Sts. Cyril and Methodius (Ostrava-Pustkovec)
- Church of St. John of Nepomuk (Ostrava)
- Church of St. James the Great (Ostrava-Plesná)
- Church of St. Joseph (Slezská Ostrava)
- Church of St. Joseph (Ostrava)
- Church of St. Catherine (Ostrava)
- Church of Christ the King (Ostrava)
- Church of St. Nicholas (Ostrava)
- Church of the Assumption of the Virgin Mary (Ostrava-Michálkovice)
- Church of the Assumption of the Virgin Mary (Ostrava-Třebovice)
- Church of the Visitation of the Virgin Mary (Ostrava)
- Church of the Immaculate Conception of the Virgin Mary (Ostrava-Radvanice)
- Church of the Virgin Mary the Queen (Ostrava)
- Church of the Virgin Mary the Queen of the Holy Rosary (Ostrava)
- Church of St. Paul (Ostrava)
- Cathedral of the Divine Saviour (Ostrava)
- Church of the Immaculate Conception of the Virgin Mary (Ostrava-Přívoz)
- Church of St. Wenceslaus (Ostrava)

== Education ==
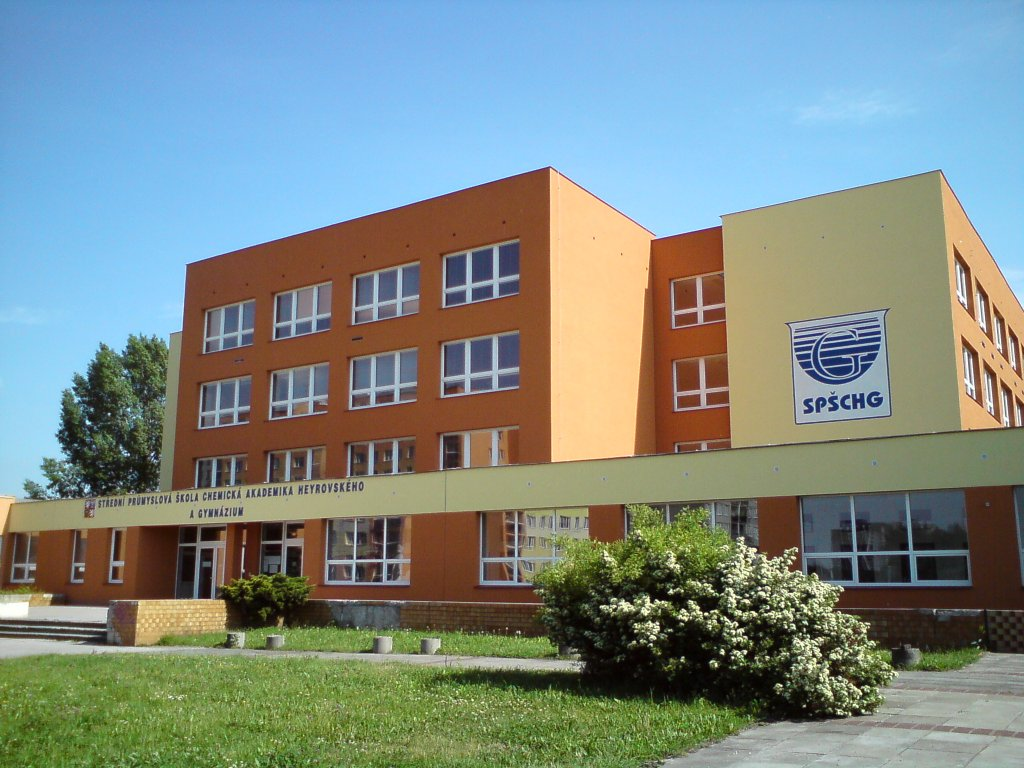
Heyrovský Secondary Industrial School and High School

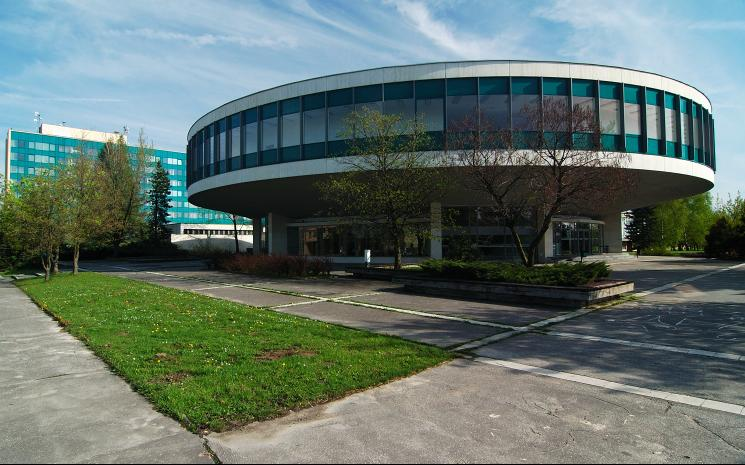
VŠB-Technical University of Ostrava

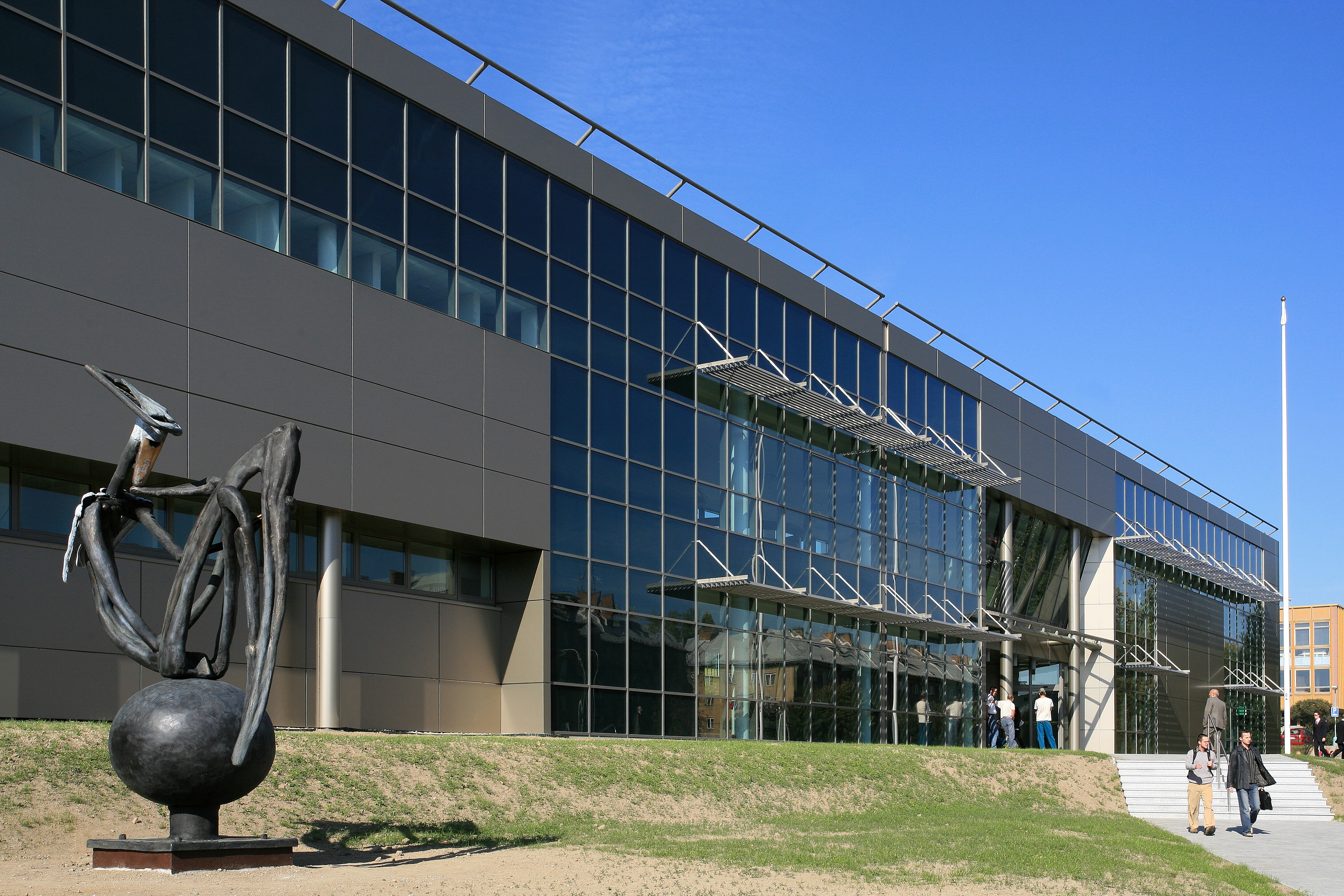
VŠB-Technical University of Ostrava – Ceremonial Hall

=== Secondary schools ===
- 1st International School of Ostrava
- Diocese High School, Ostrava
- Episcopal Grammar School
- EDUCAnet Private High School, Ostrava
- Hladnov High School
- Olga Havlová High School
- Ostrava-Hrabůvka High School
- Ostrava-Zábřeh High School
- Janáček Conservatory and High School, Ostrava
- Pavel Tigrid Foreign Languages High School
- Matiční High School, Ostrava
- Business Academy and Higher Social Care Vocational College, Ostrava-Mariánské Hory
- Business Academy, Ostrava-Poruba
- PORG International School, Ostrava
- Private Business Academy, Ostrava
- Dana and Emil Zátopek Sports High School
- Secondary Transport Vocational School and Secondary Apprentice College, Ostrava-Vítkovice
- Secondary Waldorf Vocational School, Ostrava
- Secondary Industrial School for Electrical Engineering and Information Technology, Ostrava
- Heyrovský Secondary Industrial School and High School
- Secondary Industrial School, Ostrava-Vítkovice
- Secondary Civil Engineering Industrial School, Ostrava
- Secondary Electrical Engineering Industrial School, Ostrava
- Secondary School, Ostrava-Kunčice
- Prof. Zdeněk Matějček Secondary School
- Secondary School for Services and Business, Ostrava-Poruba
- Secondary Catering School, Ostrava-Hrabůvka
- Secondary Civil Engineering and Timber Processing School, Ostrava
- Secondary Teleinformatics School, Ostrava
- Secondary Art School, Ostrava
- Secondary Gardening School, Ostrava
- Secondary Health Care School and Higher Health Care Vocational College, Ostrava
- Vítkovice Secondary Industrial School and High School
- Wichterle High School

=== Higher vocational colleges ===
- AHOL Higher Vocational College
- Higher Social Care Vocational College
- Jan Amos Komenský Higher Vocational College
- Higher Health Care Vocational College

=== Universities ===
- VSB – Technical University of Ostrava
- University of Ostrava
- Business School Ostrava
- Katowice School of Economics, Ostrava faculty
- Newport International University, Ostrava branch
- Paneuropean University, Ostrava branch

=== Library ===
- The Moravian-Silesian Research Library, with a historical and cultural department, is located in the town hall at Prokeš Square.

=== Schools teaching in foreign languages ===
- The Ostrava International School
- 1st International School of Ostrava
- Ostrčilova Bilingual School
- Hello s.r.o. – High School, Primary School and Nursery School
- Monty School – Primary School and Nursery School
- Hladnov High School and Language School, Slezská Ostrava
- Pavel Tigrid Foreign Languages High School, Ostrava-Poruba
- PORG Primary School and High School

== Judicial institutions ==
Ostrava's Regional Court is based in a historic building on the Ostravice embankment (Havlíčkovo nábřeží) in the city centre. Its jurisdiction extends to the whole of the Moravian-Silesian Region. The District Court is based in a new building on U Soudu St. in the Municipal District of Poruba. Its jurisdiction covers the territory of the City of Ostrava. The district courts of Ostrava and Brno are the largest in the country in terms of the number of judges. In addition to these courts Ostrava is also home to regional and district Public Prosecutor's Offices, as well as a branch of the Olomouc-based Supreme Public Prosecutor's Office.

== Sport ==
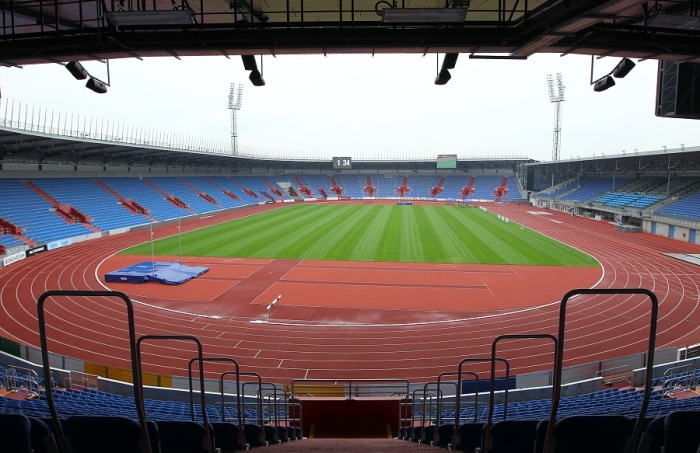
Vítkovice stadium

Ostrava has several sports clubs in various sports, and has hosted many major national and international sports events. In 2014 the city was one of the European Cities of Sport. Ostrava is home to a number of top-level sports clubs, including FC Baník Ostrava (football), HC Vítkovice Steel (ice hockey), BK NH Ostrava (basketball), 1. SC Vítkovice and FBC Ostrava (floorball), Arrows Ostrava (baseball and softball), and VK Ostrava (volleyball).

Sports venues in the city include athletics facilities, football pitches and stadiums, ice rinks and ice stadiums, multi-purpose sports halls, tennis courts, squash clubs, indoor and outdoor swimming pools, among others. The most important facilities are operated by the city-owned company SAREZA. The company's outdoor swimming pool in Ostrava-Poruba is the largest facility of its kind in Central Europe.

Ostrava has opportune conditions for cycling, with its generally flat terrain and an extensive network of cycle routes. There are also several popular leisure and recreation areas in the region surrounding Ostrava; the Beskids and Jeseníky Mountains (about 30 km (19 mi) and 60 km (37 mi) from Ostrava respectively) are popular with skiers in the winter season, and hikers, cyclists and anglers from spring to autumn. A special "cyclebus" shuttles between Ostrava and the Beskydy Mountains from May to September, enabling cyclists to transport their bikes on a special trailer. In the winter there is a similar service for skiers known as the "skibus".

There are also several golf courses in the region, including the Šilheřovice golf club in the grounds of the local château, and courses in Čeladná, Ropice and Ostravice. About 30 km (19 mi) from Ostrava is another golf course in Kravaře.

Ostrava has a long tradition of hosting top-level European and world championships. The Golden Spike international athletics meeting has been held in the city every year since 1961. The Ostrava Marathon was established in 1954 and has been held annually since 1974. In 2004, 2015, and 2024 Ostrava co-hosted (with Prague) the IIHF Ice Hockey World Championship at the Ostrava Aréna.

The Trade Union Stadium was a 60,000 capacity stadium that existed between 1954 and 1999. It was used primarily for motorcycle speedway but also hosted the Spartakiad in 1955 and 1960.

Major sporting events to have been hosted in Ostrava include:

- 1986: Volleyball Women's World Championship
- 1987: World Weightlifting Championship
- 1990: Men's Handball World Championship
- 1992: Bodybuilding European Championship
- 1993: World Junior Ice Hockey Championship
- 2001: Men's European Volleyball Championship
- 2003: UEFA Futsal Championship; World Junior Figure Skating Championship
- 2004: UEFA Futsal Championship; World Junior Latin Dance Championship; IIHF Ice Hockey World Championship
- 2005: UEFA Futsal Championship; World Latin Dance Championship
- 2006: Teamgym European Championship; Men's World Bodybuilding Championship
- 2007: First Round, World Group, Davis Cup; IIAF World Youth Championship in Athletics
- 2008: Men's World Floorball Championship – group stage
- 2009: Freestyle Motocross World Championship
- 2009: U20 European Rugby Championship – Group B
- 2010: Basketball World Championship for Women
- 2011: European Athletics U23 Championship
- 2013: Women's World Floorball Championship
- 2015: Davis Cup, IIHF Ice Hockey World Championship
- 2018: IAAF Continental Cup Ostrava 2018
- 2019–2020: 2020 World Junior Ice Hockey Championship
- 2020–2022: AGEL Women's Tennis Open, a WTA 500 event
- 2024: IIHF Ice Hockey World Championship

== Notable people ==
- Max Winter (1903–1996), American businessman and sport executive
- Joseph Wechsberg (1907–1983), writer and journalist
- Stephan Körner (1913–2000), British philosopher
- Artur London (1915–1986), politician and author
- Vlastimil Brodský (1920–2002), actor
- Karel Reisz (1926–2002), British filmmaker
- Věra Chytilová (1929–2014), film director
- Yehuda Bacon (born 1929), Israeli artist, Holocaust survivor
- Jaroslav Čejka (1936–2022), dancer, mime and actor
- Dieter F. Uchtdorf (born 1940), member of the Quorum of the Twelve Apostles of the Church of the Jesus Christ of Latter Day Saints
- Radim Uzel (1940–2022), sexologist
- Marie Rottrová, (born 1941), singer
- Hana Zagorová (1946–2022), singer-songwriter
- Karel Loprais (1949–2021), rally raid driver
- Jaromír Šindel (born 1959), ice hockey player
- Ivan Lendl (born 1960), Czech-American tennis player
- Pavel Srníček (1968–2015), footballer
- Nikola Ristanovski (born 1969), Macedonian actor
- Petr Mrázek (born 1992), ice hockey player
- Klára Peslarová (born 1996), ice hockey player
- Ondřej Satoria (born 1997), baseball player
- Jakub Dobeš (born 2001), ice hockey player
- Miroslav Knedla (born 2005), swimmer

=== Mayors ===
The first mayor of Moravian Ostrava was Hermann Zwierzina. The list of mayors and other top city officials of the time includes:

- 1861–1864 Hermann Zwierzina
- 1864–1873 Alois Anderka
- 1873–1880 Konstantin Grünwald
- 1880–1888 Anton Lux
- 1888–1901 Adalbert Johanny
- 1901–1918 Gustav Fiedler
- 1918–1918 Johann Ulrich
- 1918–1935 Jan Prokeš
- 1935–1939 Josef Chalupník
- 1939–1940 Josef Hinner
- 1940–1945 Emil Beier
- 1945–1945 Josef Lampa
- 1945–1960 Josef Kotas
- 1960–1964 Jan Buchvaldek
- 1964–1968 Josef Kempný
- 1968–1971 Zdeněk Kupka
- 1971–1986 Eduard Foltýn
- 1986–1989 Bedřich Lipina
- 1989–1990 Lubomír Vejr
- 1990–1993 Jiří Smejkal
- 1993–2001 Evžen Tošenovský
- 2001–2002 Čestmír Vlček
- 2002–2006 Aleš Zedník
- 2006–2014 Petr Kajnar
- 2014–2023 Tomáš Macura
- 2023– Jan Dohnal

== Twin towns – sister cities ==
Ostrava is twinned with:

- Abomey, Benin
- Coventry, England, United Kingdom
- Dnipro, Ukraine
- Dresden, Germany
- Gaziantep, Turkey
- Katowice, Poland
- Košice, Slovakia
- Miskolc, Hungary
- Oral, Kazakhstan
- Piraeus, Greece
- Pittsburgh, United States
- Shreveport, United States
- Split, Croatia
