= Proskovice (Ostrava) =

Coordinates: 49.7527°N 18.1990°E

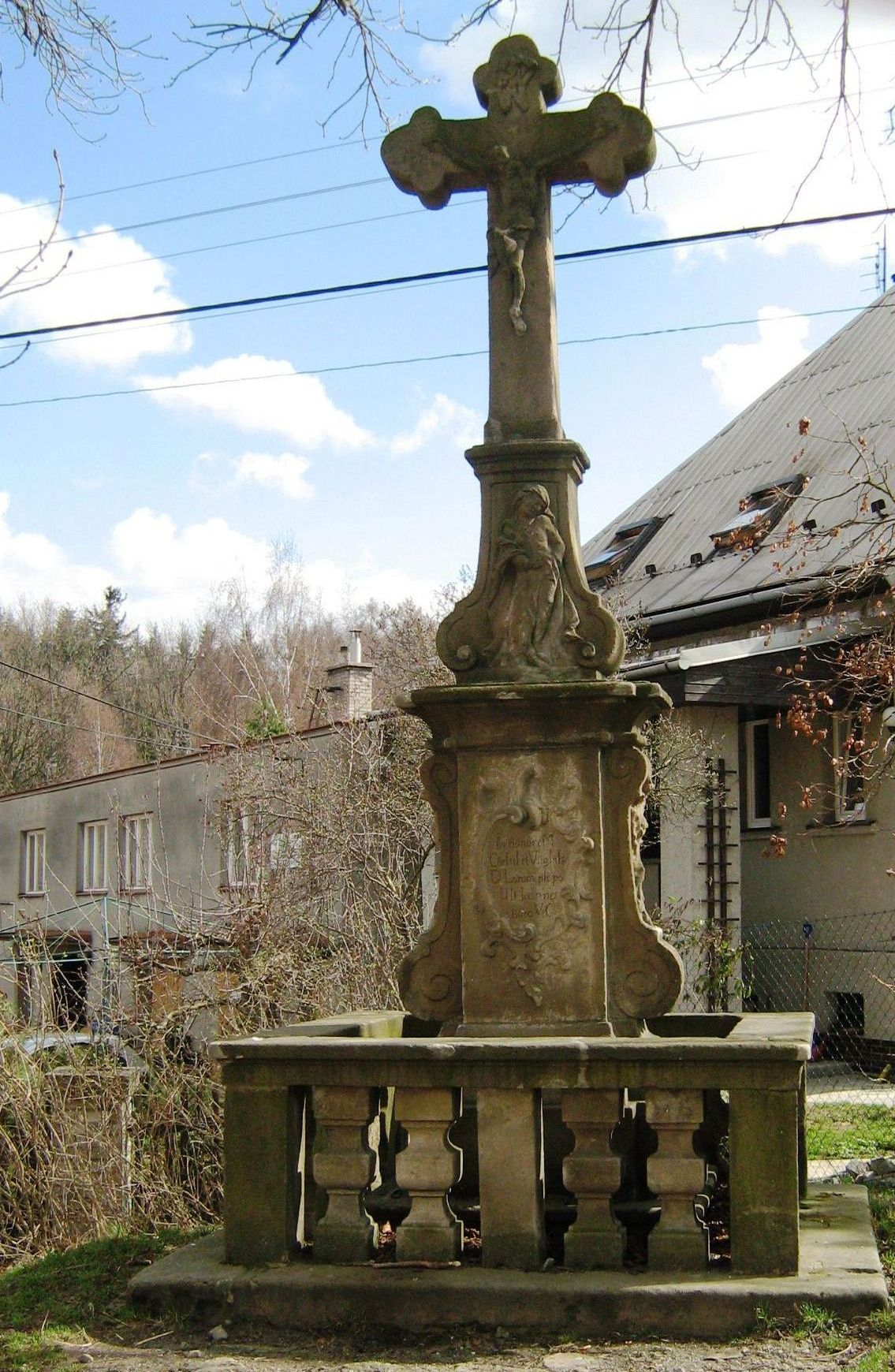
A cross in Proskovice

Proskovice on the map of Ostrava

Proskovice is a village and administrative part of Ostrava in the Moravian-Silesian Region of the Czech Republic It has about 1,200 inhabitants. Proskovice is located on the southwestern edge of Ostrava.

== History ==
The first approved written reference appeared in the book of Roman Catholic Archdiocese. The patron for Proskovice is Saint Florian.

In 1394 it was an agricultural village. Since 24 November 1990, it has been a part of the city of Ostrava Even though Proskovice became a district of Ostrava the number of people living there stayed almost the same.
