= Kunčice (Ostrava) =

Coordinates: 49°47′25″N 18°17′31″E

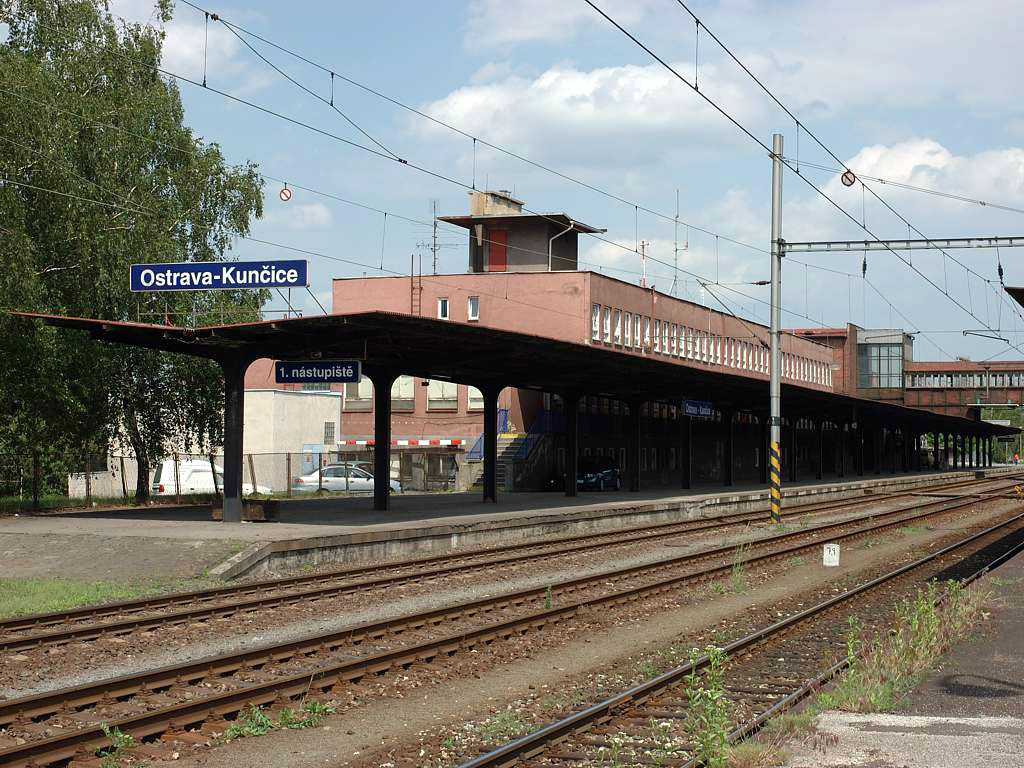
Train station in Kunčice

Kunčice (Polish: Kończyce Wielkie, German: Gross Kunzendorf, till 1908 known as Velké Kunčice, then as Kunčice nad Ostravicí) is a part of the city of Ostrava, Moravian-Silesian Region in the Czech Republic. Administratively it is a part of the district of Slezská Ostrava. Kunčice was formerly an independent municipality, in 1941 it became a part of Ostrava. It lies in the historical region of Cieszyn Silesia.

== History ==
The village was first mentioned in a Latin document of Diocese of Wrocław called Liber fundationis episcopatus Vratislaviensis from around 1305 as item in Cuncindorf. It meant that the village was in the process of location (the size of land to pay tithe from was not yet precised). The dorf (German for a village) ending of its name indicates that the primordial settlers were of German origins. The creation of the village was a part of a larger settlement campaign taking place in the late 13th century on the territory of what became known as Upper Silesia.

Politically the village belonged initially to the Duchy of Cieszyn, formed in 1290 in the process of feudal fragmentation of Poland and was ruled by a local branch of Piast dynasty. In 1327 the duchy became a fee of Kingdom of Bohemia, which after 1526 became part of the Habsburg monarchy.

The village could have become a seat of a Catholic parish early after location as an incomplete register of Peter's Pence payment from 1335 mentioned Cunczendorf', however there were two other villages named the same in the Teschen deaconry. Another register of Peter's Pence payment from 1447 among 50 parishes of Teschen deaconry mentioned two villages called Cunczendorff.

The village had mainly agricultural character, yet since the end of the 19th century majority of locals worked in nearby mills and coal mines.

According to the Austrian census of 1910 the village had 2,460 inhabitants, 2,417 of whom had permanent residence there. Census asked people for their native language, 2,223 (92%) were Czech-speaking and 169 (7%) were Polish-speaking. Most populous religious groups were Roman Catholics with 2,349 (95.5%) and Protestants with 89 (3.6%).

During the German occupation (World War II), the occupiers operated a forced labour "education" camp in the district.

After the war, Kunčice was heavily industrialized in the 1950s when Nová huť iron and steel works complex was built.
