= Leoš Janáček International Music Festival =

The Leoš Janáček International Music Festival (Mezinárodní hudební festival Leoše Janáčka) is a classical music festival in and around the Czech city of Ostrava.

The LJIMF was founded in 2018, and was the successor of the Janáček May International Music Festival (Mezinárodní hudební festival Janáčkův máj, founded in 1976) and the Janáček Hukvaldy (originally Janáček Music Lachia, Janáčkovo hudební Lašsko, founded in 1948). The merger took place when Jaromír Javůrek became the director of both festivals.

The festival takes places from the end of May until the beginning of July. It is opened with a performance of Janáček's Sinfonietta.
