= Stodolní street (Ostrava) =

Street in Ostrava, Czech Republic

Stodolní
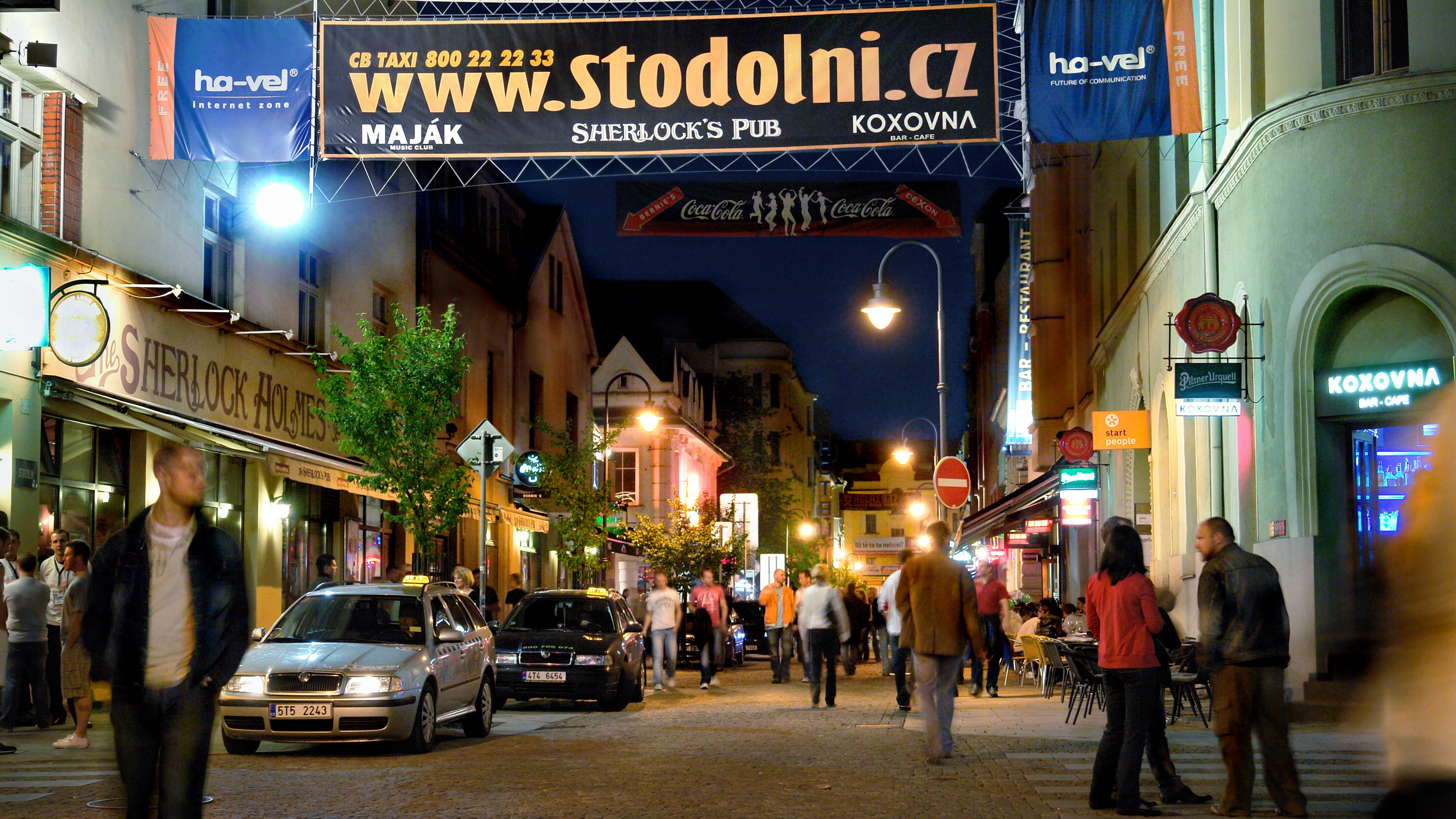
- Interactive map of Stodolní
- Part of: Ostrava
- Length: cca 380 m
- Area: Moravian Ostrava
- Postal code: 725 27
- Coordinates: 49°50′9.3″N 18°17′7.4″E

Stodolní street is a street in the city centre of Ostrava. It is a unique phenomenon of Ostravian social life. The street itself and its closest surroundings offers tens of bars, restaurants and clubs, which are abundantly visited by young people, especially during the weekends. The popularity of this street had led to increased criminality, leading to police patrols and CCTV controlling it. The street was reconstructed in 2006.

In 2007, a new train stop called Ostrava centrum opened close to the end of the street. Since 2008, the train stop has been called Ostrava-Stodolní and it is supposed to make travelling to the city centre significantly easier.

The street is a part of locality, which is supposed to become a new cultural quarter in the city. In 2020, the reconstruction of an old building of the city slaughterhouse took place. It is a new seat of the gallery of contemporary art called PLATO. The city of Ostrava offers the whole block of buildings on this street to private investors to partly or completely demolish existing buildings and to build a new block of high-quality architecture with commercial ground floor and quality services.

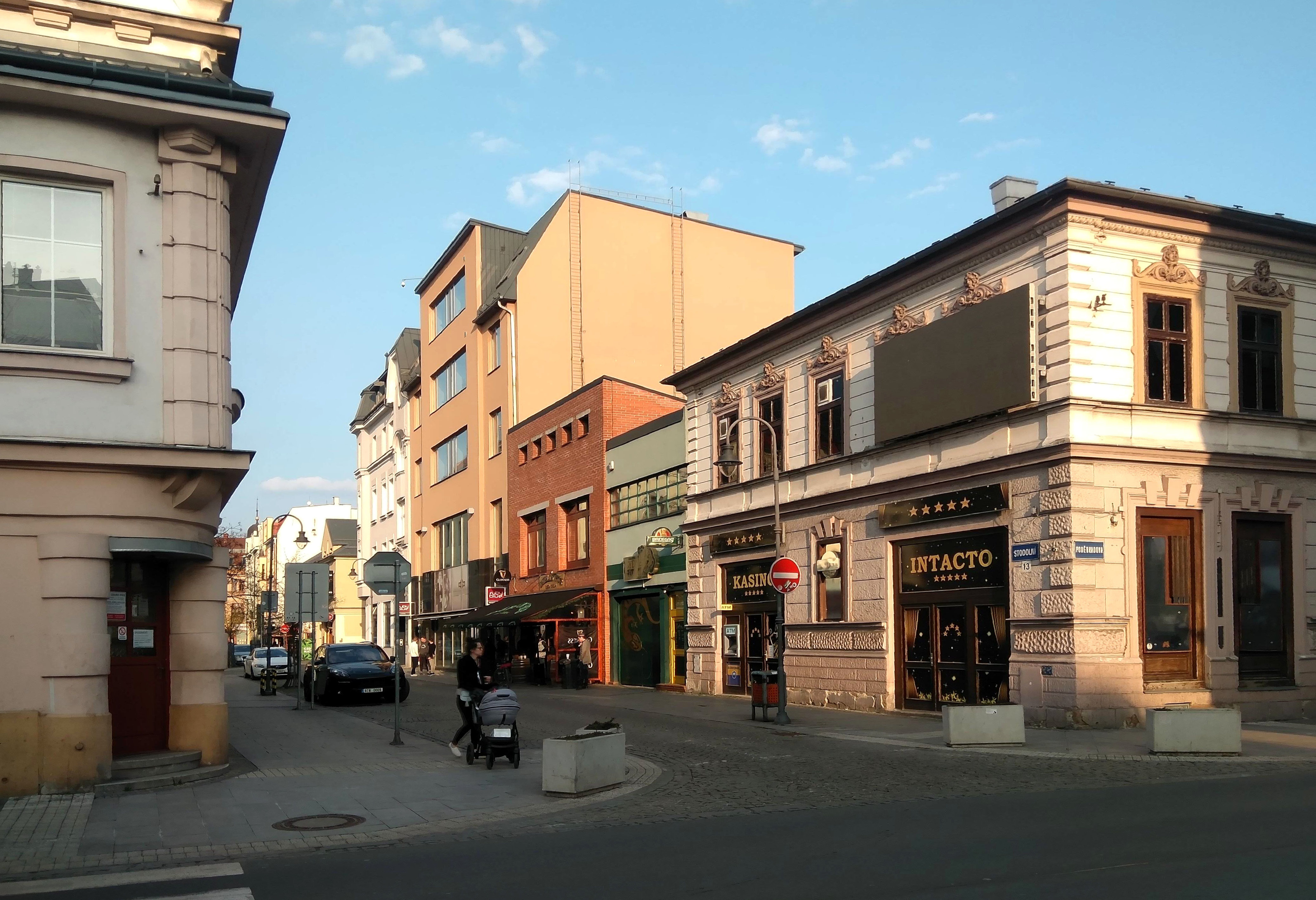
Stodolní street

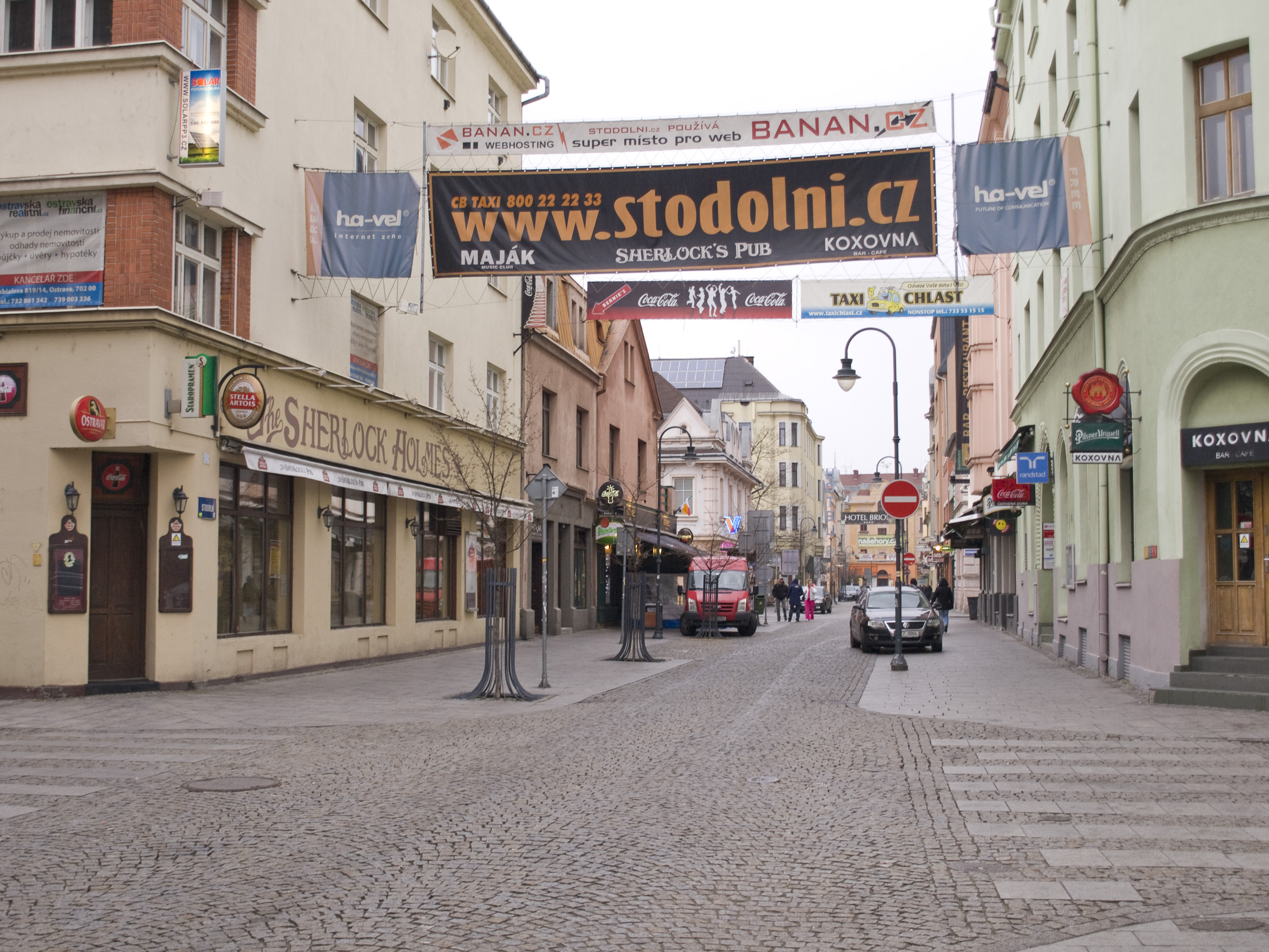
Stodolní street

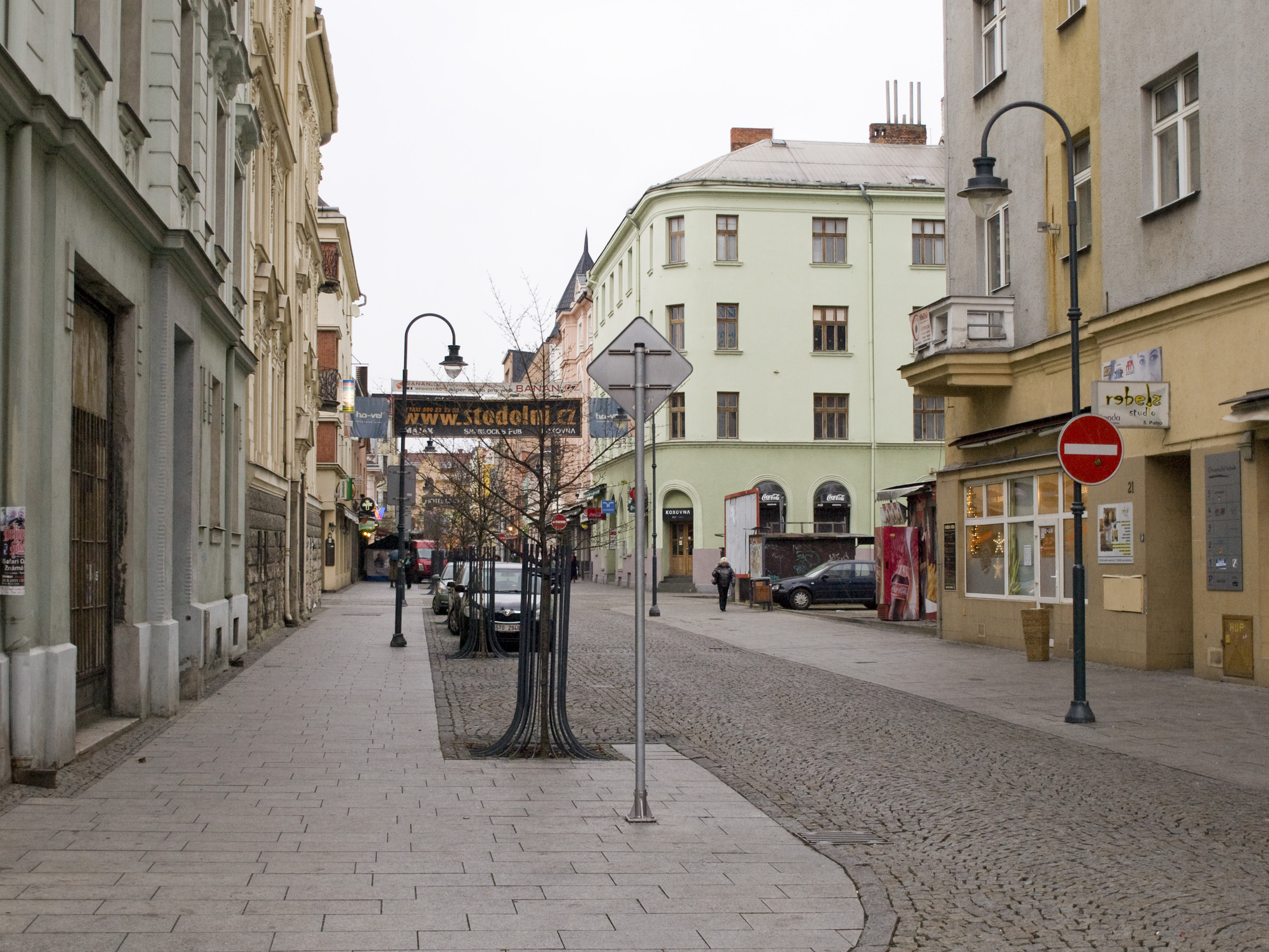
Stodolní street

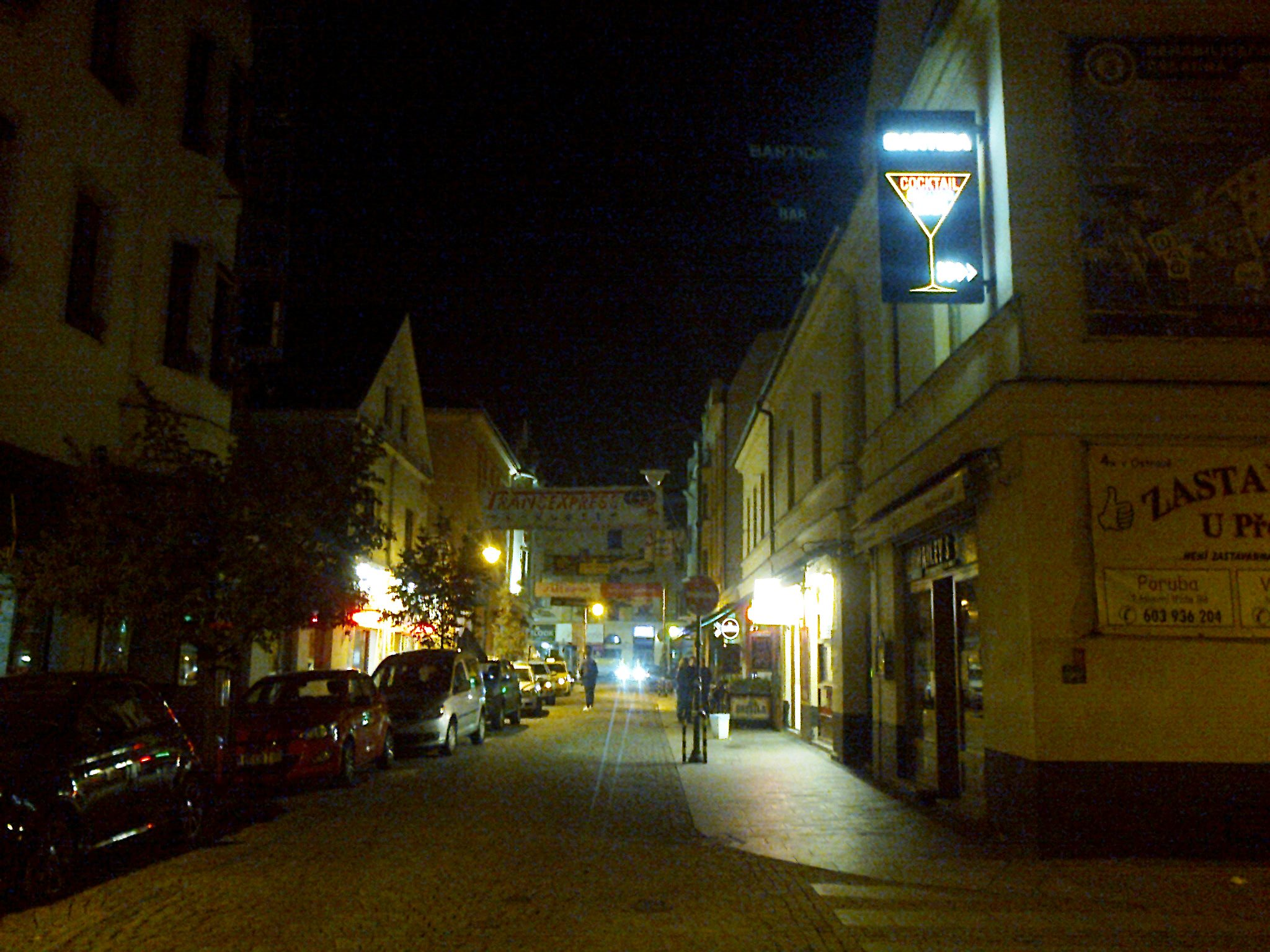
Stodolní street in Ostrava at night

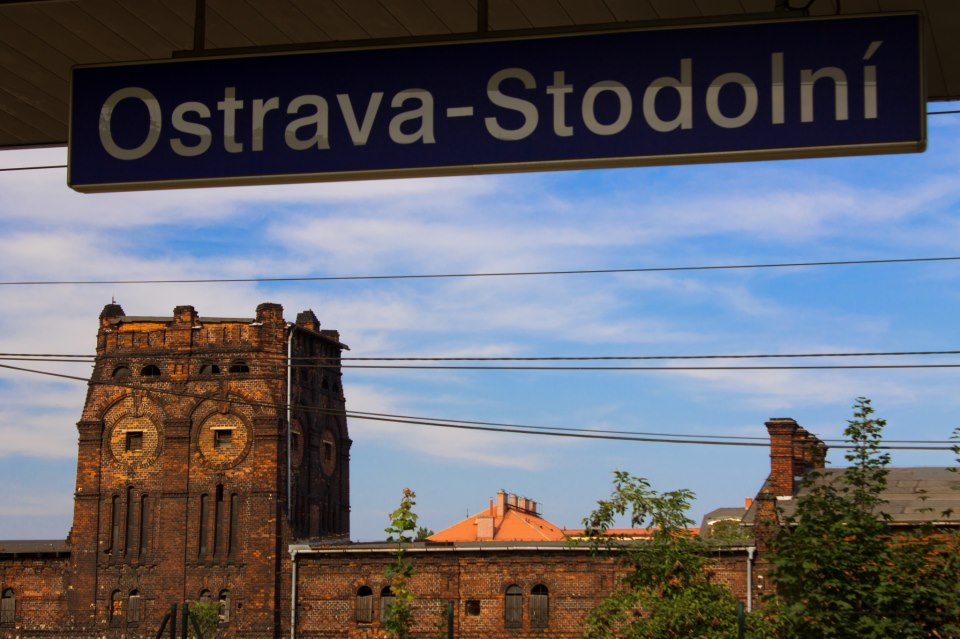
Train stop Ostrava-Stodolní

== See also ==
- Paceville, nightlife hub in Malta
