= Plesná (Ostrava) =

Borough of Ostrava, Czech Republic

- Borough of Ostrava
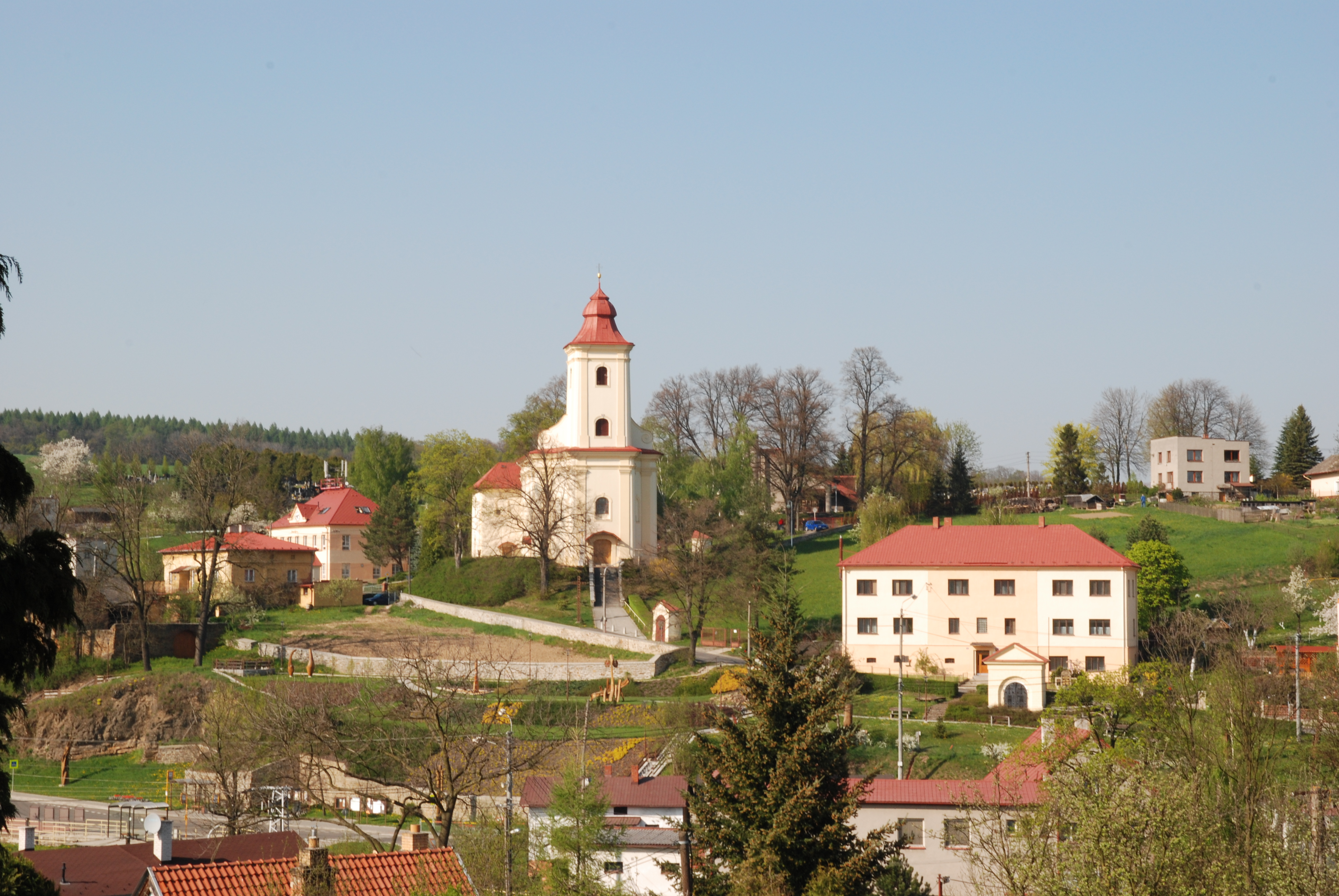
- Panoramic view of Plesná

- Flag Coat of arms

- Location of Plesná in Ostrava
- Coordinates: 49.8634°N 18.1478°E
- Country: Czech Republic
- Region: Moravian-Silesian
- Municipality: Ostrava

Area
  - Total: 4.84 km^{2} (1.87 sq mi)

Population (2021)
  - Total: 1,496
  - Density: 309/km^{2} (801/sq mi)
- Time zone: UTC+1 (CET)
  - Summer (DST): UTC+2 (CEST)
- Postal code: 725 27
- Website: plesna.ostrava.cz

Plesná is a borough and municipal part of the city of Ostrava, Czech Republic. It is situated in the northwestern part of the city. Originally, it was a separate municipality, until it merged with the borough of Poruba in 1976. On 1 January 1994, Plesná was separated from Poruba, and became one of the 23 self-governing boroughs of Ostrava.

== Etymology ==
The word is derived from the Old Czech word ples, meaning 'lake'.

== Gallery ==
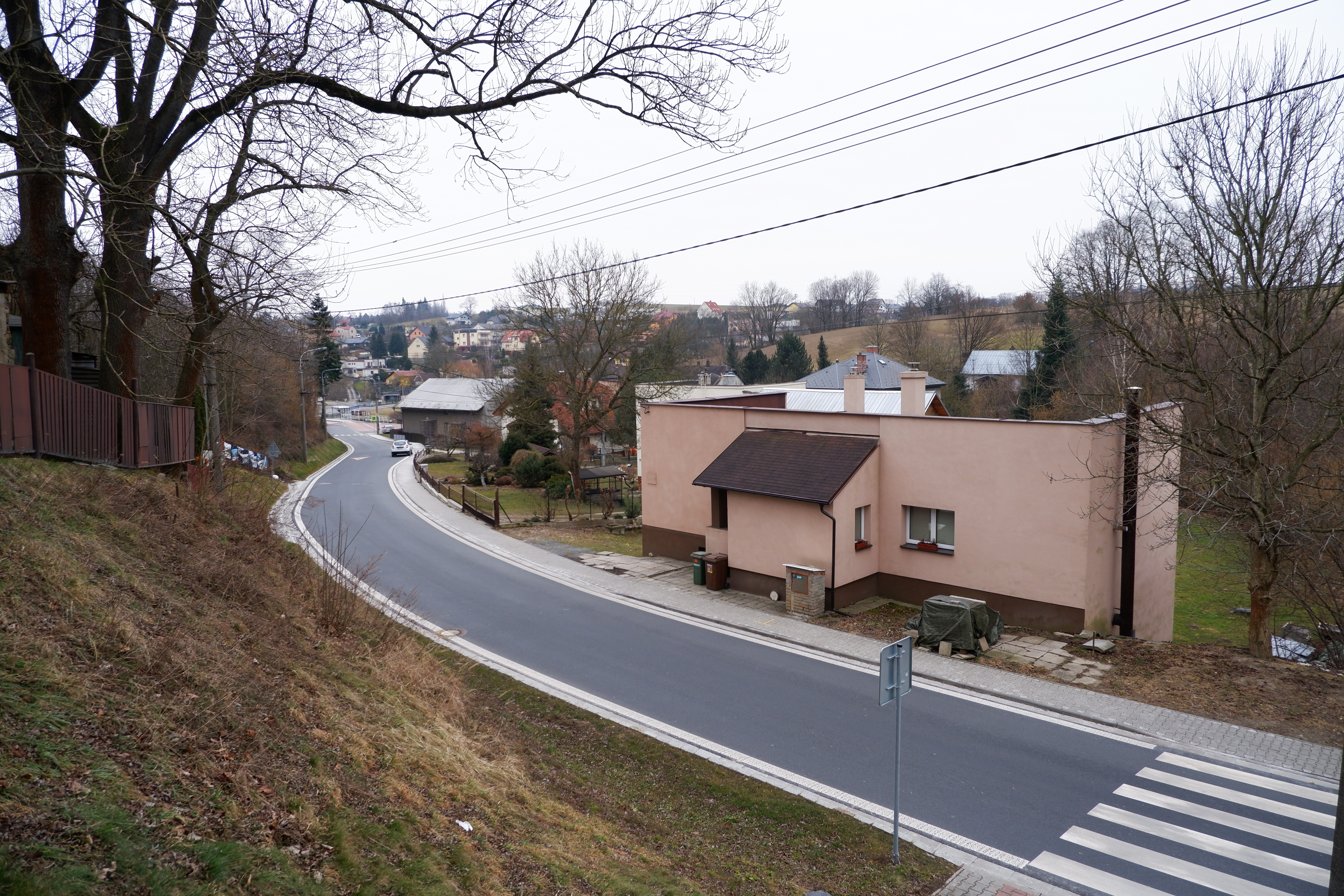
26. dubna street

Wooden statue "čumil osminohý" (eight-legged gaper)
