= Keltička's Forge Museum =

Private museum in Ostrava, Czech Republic

- Muzeum Keltičkova kovárna
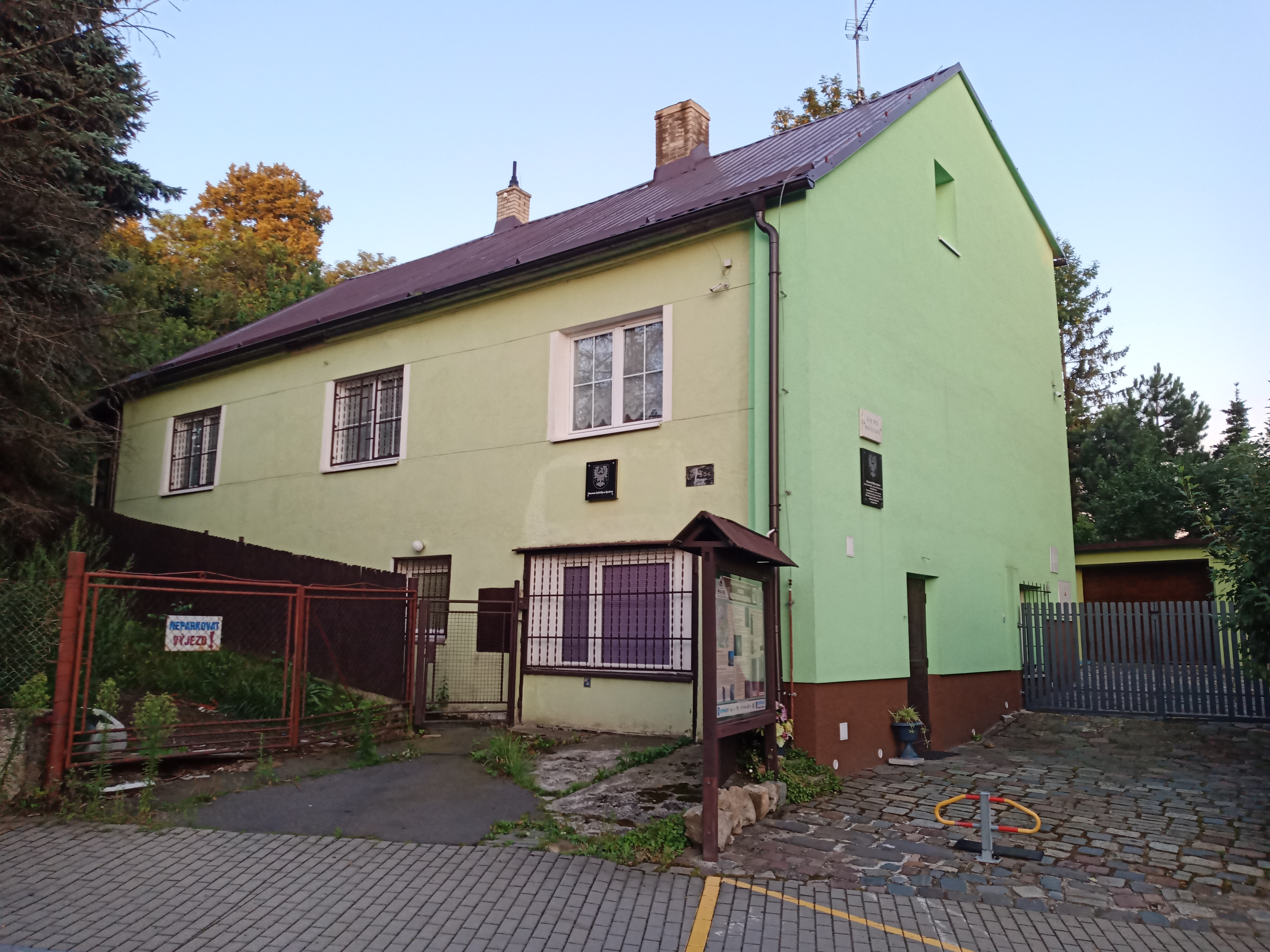
- Front view
- Established: 2000
- Location: Keltičkova ul. 136/6, Ostrava (Slezská Ostrava), Czech Republic
- Coordinates: 49°50′16″N 18°17′56″E
- Type: Private museum
- Founders: Svatopluk Chodura, Danuše Chodurová

The Keltička's Forge Museum (Czech: Muzeum Keltičkova kovárna) is a private museum in Ostrava, Czech Republic. The museum features exhibits showcasing the region's blacksmithing and mining heritage.

It is believed that the blacksmith Jan Keltička, who is credited with the discovery of coal in the Ostrava region, worked here in the 18th century.

== Description ==
The museum was established in 2000 by Silesian patriot Svatopluk Chodura (with the consent of his wife Danuše Chodurová) in their family home on Keltičkova Street in Slezská Ostrava. The museum's exhibits focus on blacksmithing, mining and the settlement in the Ostrava region. Its oldest exhibit is a set of stone tools from the Early Stone Age uncovered in Cieszyn Silesia.

The private museum has no permanent or paid employees; its operation is entirely financed by the modest income of its owners. Visits can be arranged with the owners, e.g. by phone. Due to limited space, tours are limited to twelve people (or fifteen pupils). Entrance fee is voluntary. The site is included on the Slezská Ostrava Nature Trail.

By the fence outside the museum, there is a chapel dedicated to Saint Hedwig — the patron saint of Silesia. In the garden, there is a small memorial commemorating the discovery of coal. As a result of mining activities, the house and its surrounding are gradually sinking.

== History ==
The museum is located in a building dating back to 1866. It was raised on the foundations of an earlier building, which some estimates date to before 1700.

The site is tied to the discovery of coal in the Ostrava region in the mid-18th century. According to legend, a blacksmith of modest means, Jan Keltička, had his workshop here at the time, in what was then Polská Ostrava (present-day Slezská Ostrava), working in the service of Count Wilczek. To improve his livelihood, Keltička farmed his own crops, cultivating a plot of land in a valley called Burňa. In the middle his field, a large tree stood in the way of cultivation. To clear the land, Keltička hired workers to fell the tree and dig out the stump. Around noon, the workers gathered around a fireplace made of excavated stones to warm themselves up. To their surprise, the black stones caught fire. Shortly afterward, Keltička sought permission from the authorities to mine and sell coal.

The discovery of coal in the Ostrava region is dated to 1763. Keltička's existence is confirmed by period documents, and during various renovations and reconstructions of the house, the Chodura family uncovered hammers, pliers, and other tools belonging to early blacksmiths. Moreover, the site's proximity to Wilczek's villa lends credibility to this story.
