= Silesian Ostrava Castle =

Castle in the Czech Republic

Coordinates: 49°49′50″N 18°18′00″E

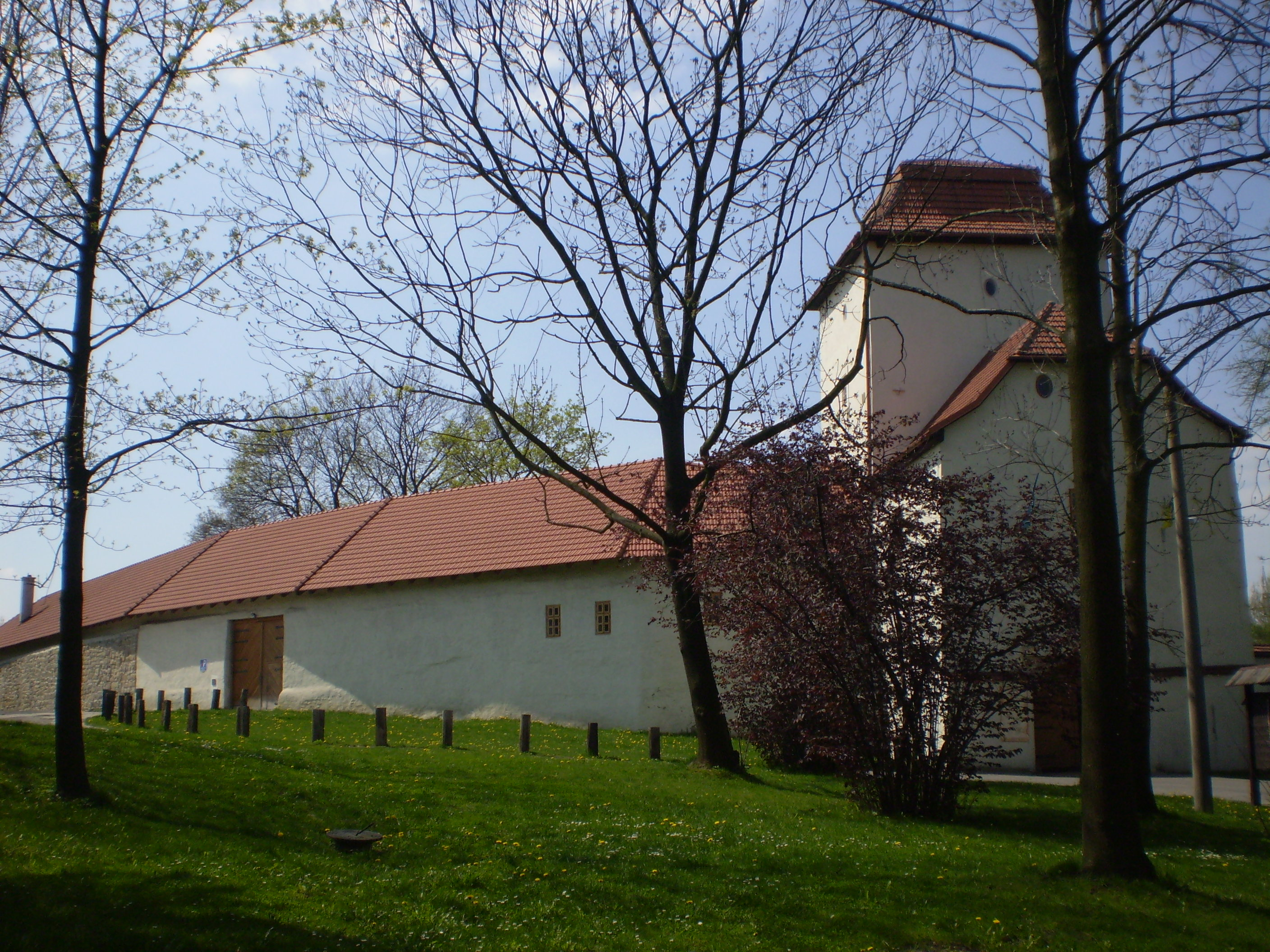

Silesian Ostrava Castle (Czech: Slezskoostravský hrad) is a Gothic castle located in Slezská Ostrava, in the Moravian-Silesian Region of the Czech Republic. It was built in 1290 by Duke Mieszko I of Cieszyn, on the border between the Duchy of Cieszyn and Moravia, near the confluence of the Lučina and Ostravice rivers.

In 1534, the castle was rebuilt into a Renaissance residence. It burned down in 1872 and was subsequently rebuilt. In 2004, it was repaired after many years of dilapidation, caused by coal mining under the castle.

Until 2012, the castle hosted the Colours of Ostrava festival.

== Gallery ==
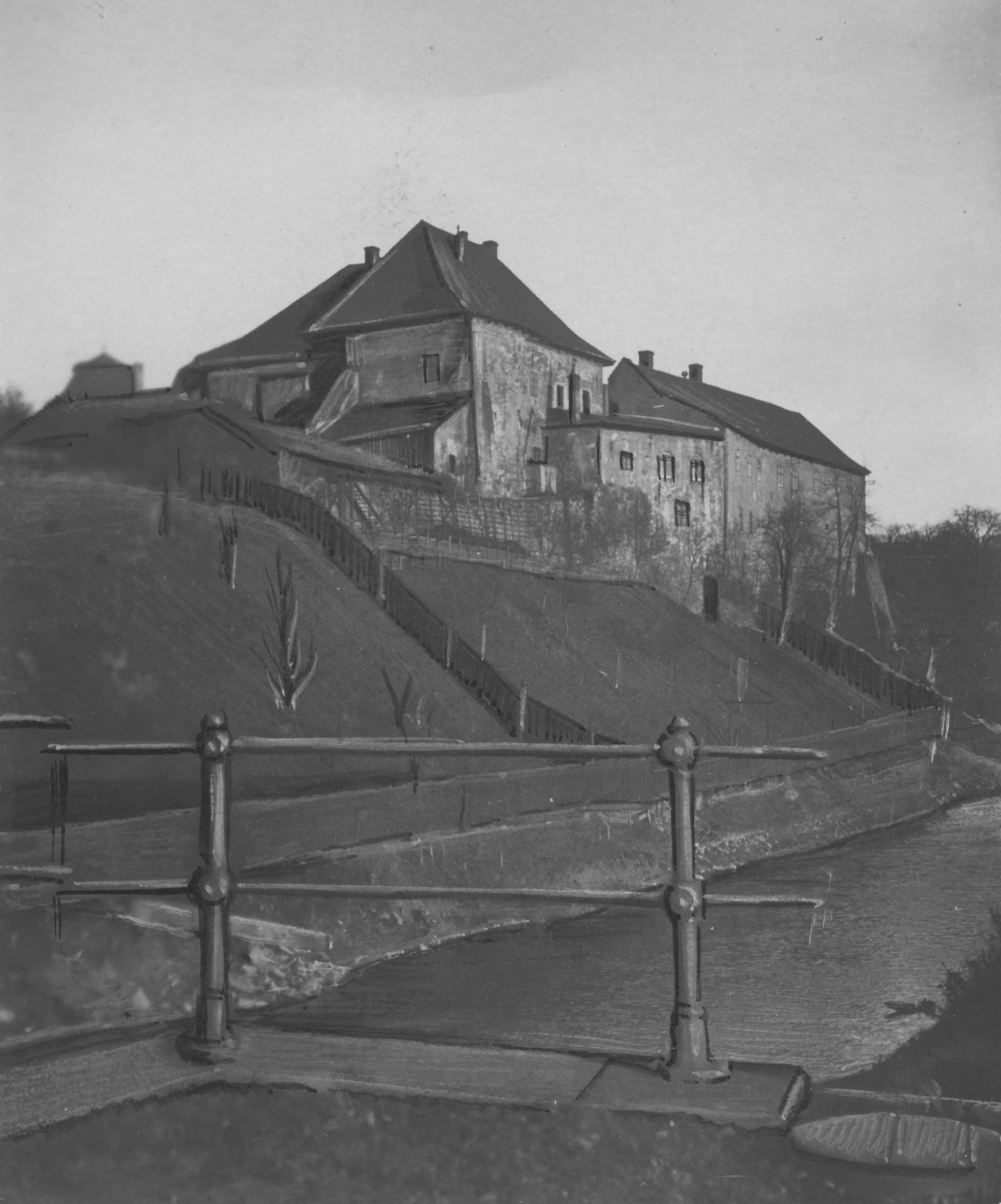
The castle in 1938

Entrance tower (2021)

The castle in 2024
