= Ostrava-Jih =

Municipal part of Ostrava, Czech Republic

- City district of Ostrava
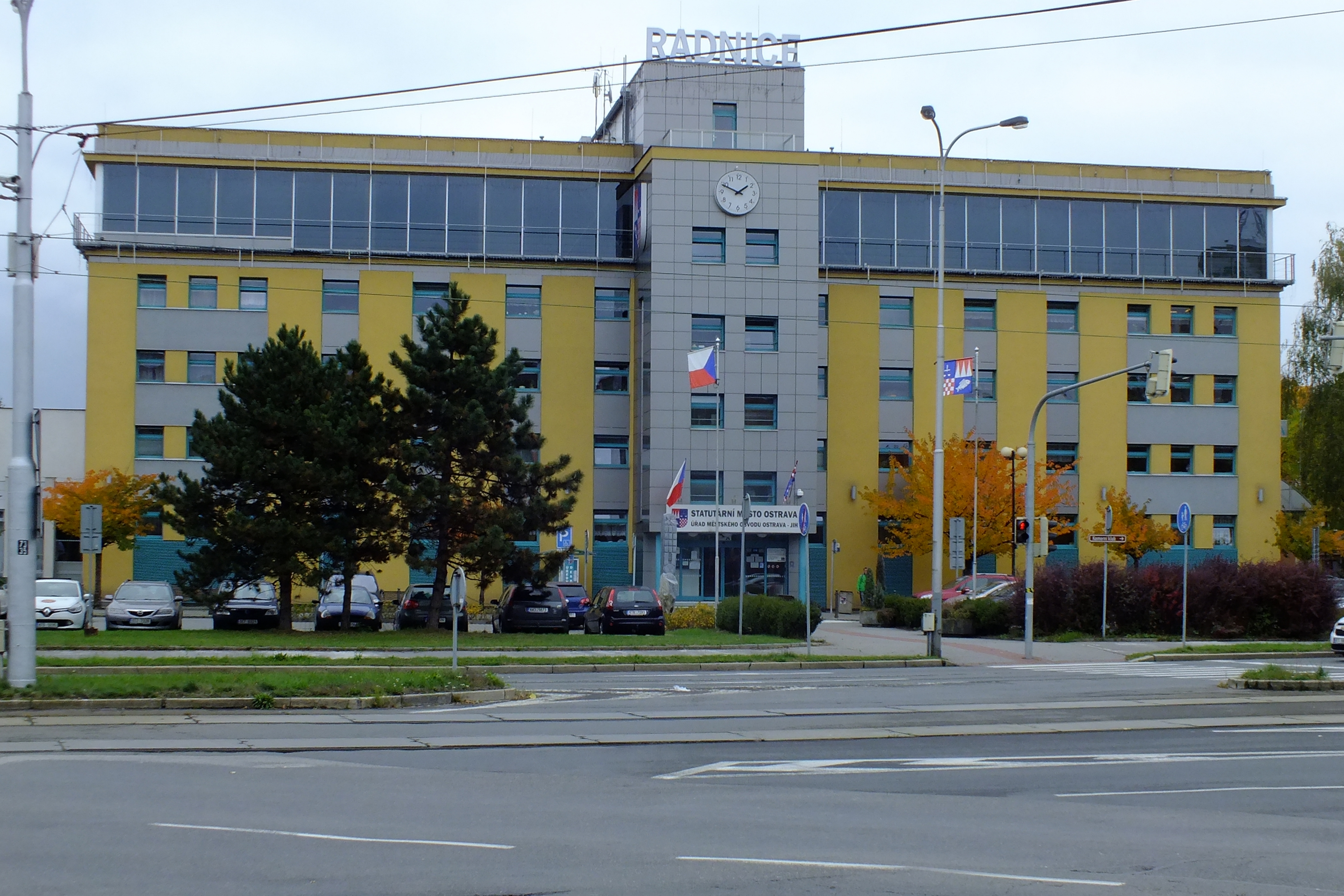
- City district office of Ostrava-Jih

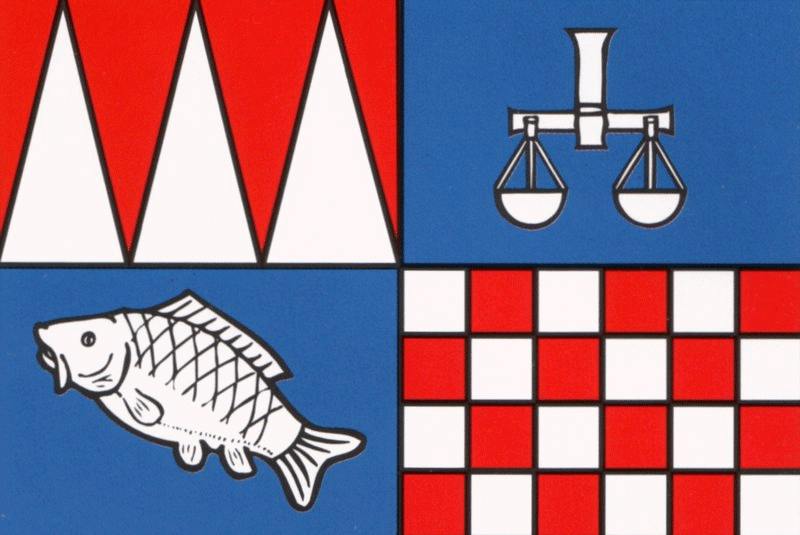
- Flag Coat of arms

- Location of Ostrava-Jih in Ostrava
- Coordinates: 49.7938°N 18.251°E
- Country: Czech Republic
- Region: Moravian-Silesian Region
- District: Ostrava-City
- City: Ostrava

Area
  - Total: 16.32 km^{2} (6.30 sq mi)

Population (2021)
  - Total: 96,871
  - Density: 5,936/km^{2} (15,370/sq mi)
- Time zone: UTC+1 (CET)
  - Summer (DST): UTC+2 (CEST)
- Postal code: 700 30
- Website: https://ovajih.ostrava.cz/cs

Ostrava-Jih (literally 'Ostrava-South') is a city district of Ostrava, a city in the Moravian-Silesian Region of the Czech Republic, located in the south-central part of the city. It comprises the municipal parts and cadastral areas of Dubina, Hrabůvka, Zábřeh, Výškovice and Bělský Les. With a population of 96,871 as of 2021, it is the most populous city district of Ostrava.

The borough is home to a forest park Bělský les, the largest forest park in Ostrava and one of the largest in Central Europe, covering an area of 1.6 km^{2} (0.618 sq mi). It also includes Avion Shopping Park Ostrava, one of the largest shopping centers in the Czech Republic, and Ostravar Aréna, which hosted the IIHF World Championship in 2004, 2015 and 2024.

== Etymology ==
The name of the borough is derived from its geographical location, as jih means south in Czech.

=== Dubina ===
The name originates from the Czech word dub, meaning oak. The area was originally covered by an oak forest.

=== Hrabůvka ===
The name is derived from the Czech word habr, meaning hornbeam. In the local dialect, it was pronounced hrab.

=== Zábřeh ===
The name is a combination of words za, meaning behind, and břeh, meaning bank, as the area is situated behind the bank of the Oder River.

=== Výškovice ===
The name comes from the given name Výšek (most likely a diminutive of an Old Czech name), who was presumably a lokator. By adding the possessive suffix -ovice, the name became Výškovice, meaning Výšek's settlement.

=== Bělský Les ===
The name refers to forest park of the same name located in the area. It was named after the creek Bělá, which flows through the area. The noun bělá comes from the Czech adjective bílý, meaning white – hence, the name refers to a 'white creek'. Bělský is an adjective form of bělá.

The neighboring boroughs Stará Bělá and Nová Bělá share the same etymology, as they are also named after the Bělá creek. A part of the forest park Bělský les is situated in Stará Bělá.

== History ==
Hrabůvka and Zábřeh were originally separate municipalities and both were incorporated into Ostrava in 1924. On 21 March 1936, an airport was established in Hrabůvka. In 1946, the airport operated flights to Prague, Zlín, Olomouc, Brno and Piešťany, with Košice added in 1951. In 1957, a Soviet delegation led by Nikita Khrushchev landed on the airport. After the opening of a new airport in Mošnov in 1959, the Hrabůvka airport was closed. The area of the airport was later built up with residential buildings, and the airport hangar is nowadays used as a commercial property.

Výškovice was originally an agricultural village located outside the borders of Ostrava, and in 1941, they merged with Ostrava. In 1954, it regained its independency, but rejoined Ostrava in 1966, when a housing estate development began in that area in the 1960s. The new estate was built during the 1970s and 1980s.

Dubina was developed as a housing estate during the 1980s and 1990s, along with Bělský Les. In both parts, the residential buildings consist primarily of panel apartment blocks. On 22 February 1988, the two city parts were connected to the city tram network.

In 1986, a new indoor arena was opened in Ostrava-Jih, serving as the home venue for the ice hockey club HC Vítkovice Ridera. In 2016, the arena was renamed to Ostravar Aréna.

On 24 November 1990, the city parts were merged into a single administrative unit, forming the Ostrava-Jih borough, which became one of the 23 self-governing boroughs of Ostrava.

In 2001, a shopping center Avion Shopping Park Ostrava was opened in Zábřeh. In 2008, it was the largest shopping center in the Moravian-Silesian Region and the second largest in the Czech Republic.

Since 2002, the borough has organized an annual summer festival Slavnosti Jihu, featuring artists like Anna K, No Name, Michal David and Xindl X.

== Demographics ==
As of the 2021 census, the population of Ostrava-Jih is 96,871, of whom 48.4% are male and 51.6% are female, compared to the nationwide average of 49.3% and 50.7% respectively. People under 15 years old make up 14.1% of the population, and people over 65 years old make up 20.2%, compared to the nationwide average of 16.1% and 20.4% respectively.

Historical population

Year	Pop.	±%
1869	2,129	—
1880	2,672	+25.5%
1890	5,165	+93.3%
1900	7,723	+49.5%
1910	9,806	+27.0%

Year	Pop.	±%
1921	13,806	+40.8%
1930	15,099	+9.4%
1950	22,532	+49.2%
1961	33,413	+48.3%
1970	70,748	+111.7%

Year	Pop.	±%
1980	90,109	+27.4%
1991	118,806	+31.8%
2001	118,094	−0.6%
2011	106,973	−9.4%
2021	96,871	−9.4%

Source: CZSO

== Gallery ==
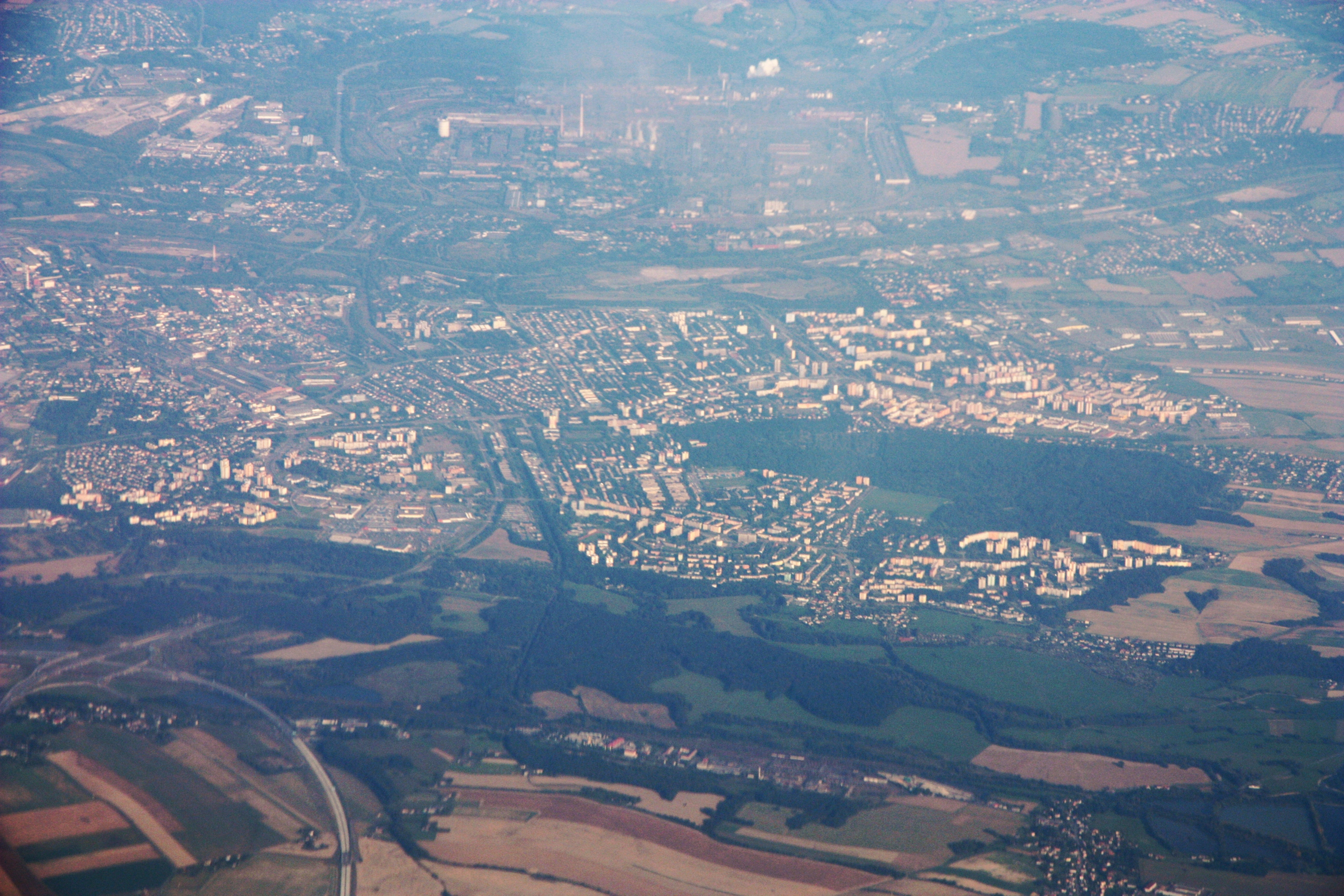
Aerial view of Ostrava-Jih

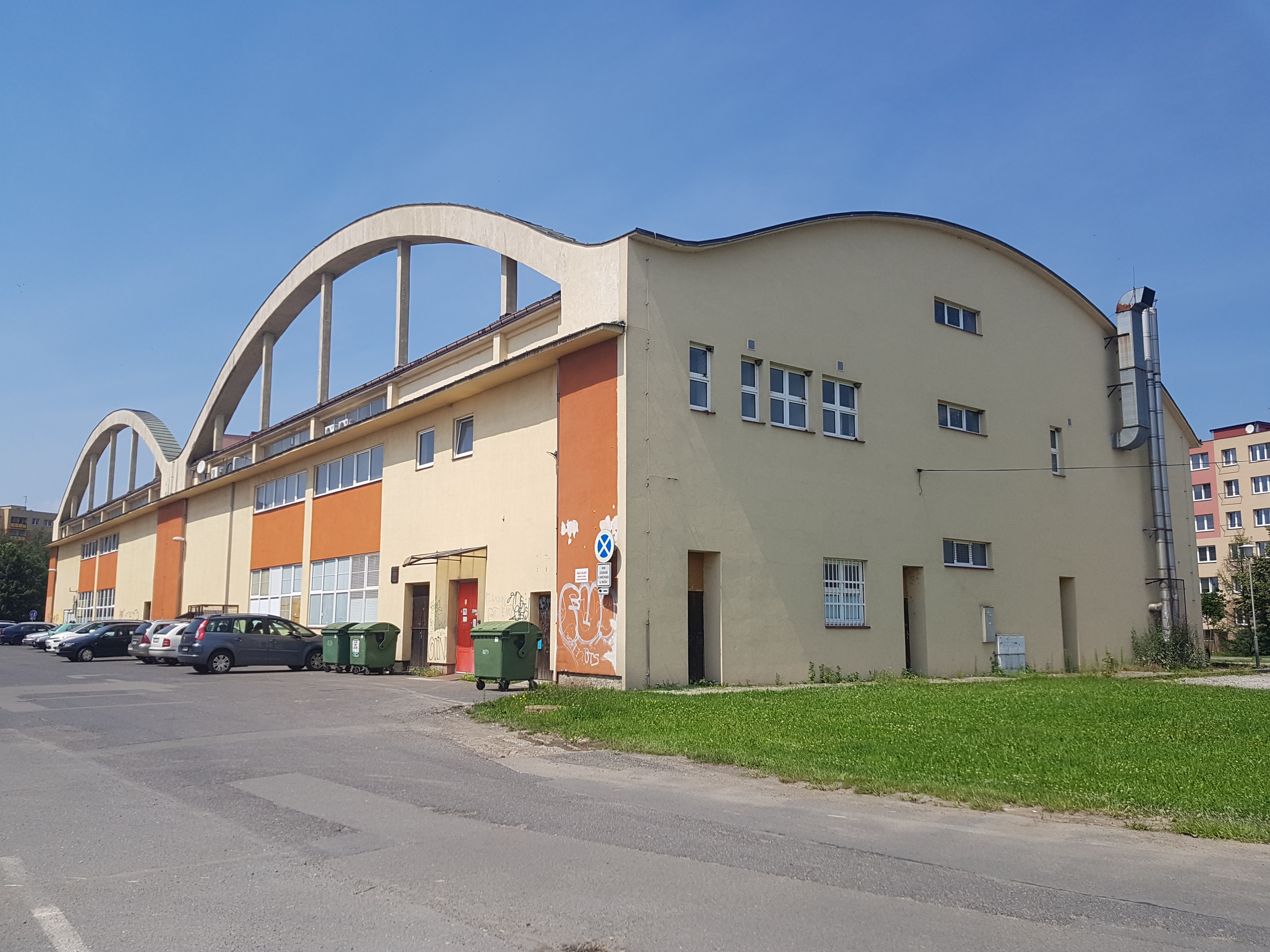
Former airport hangar in Dubina

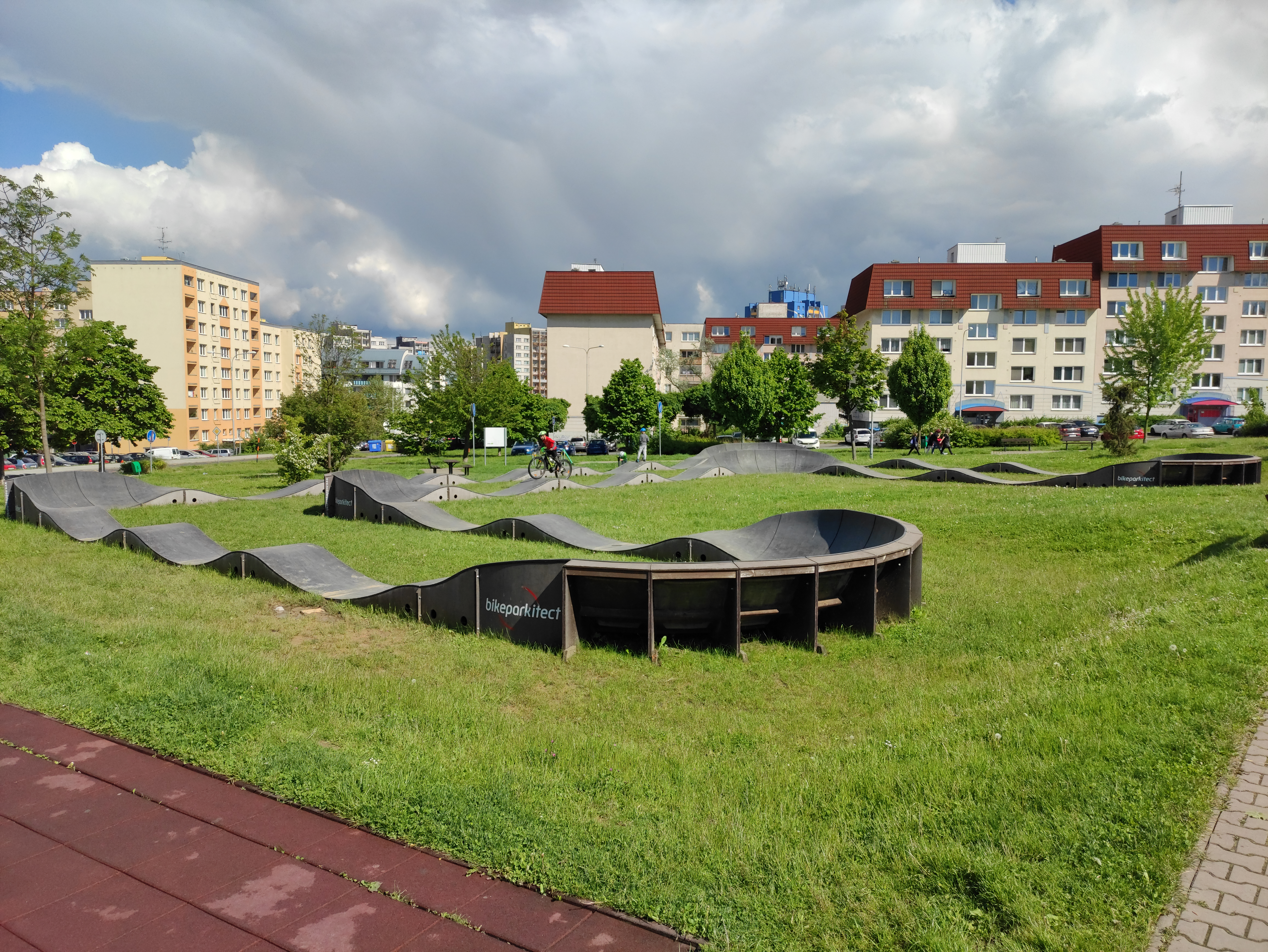
Pump track in Bělský Les

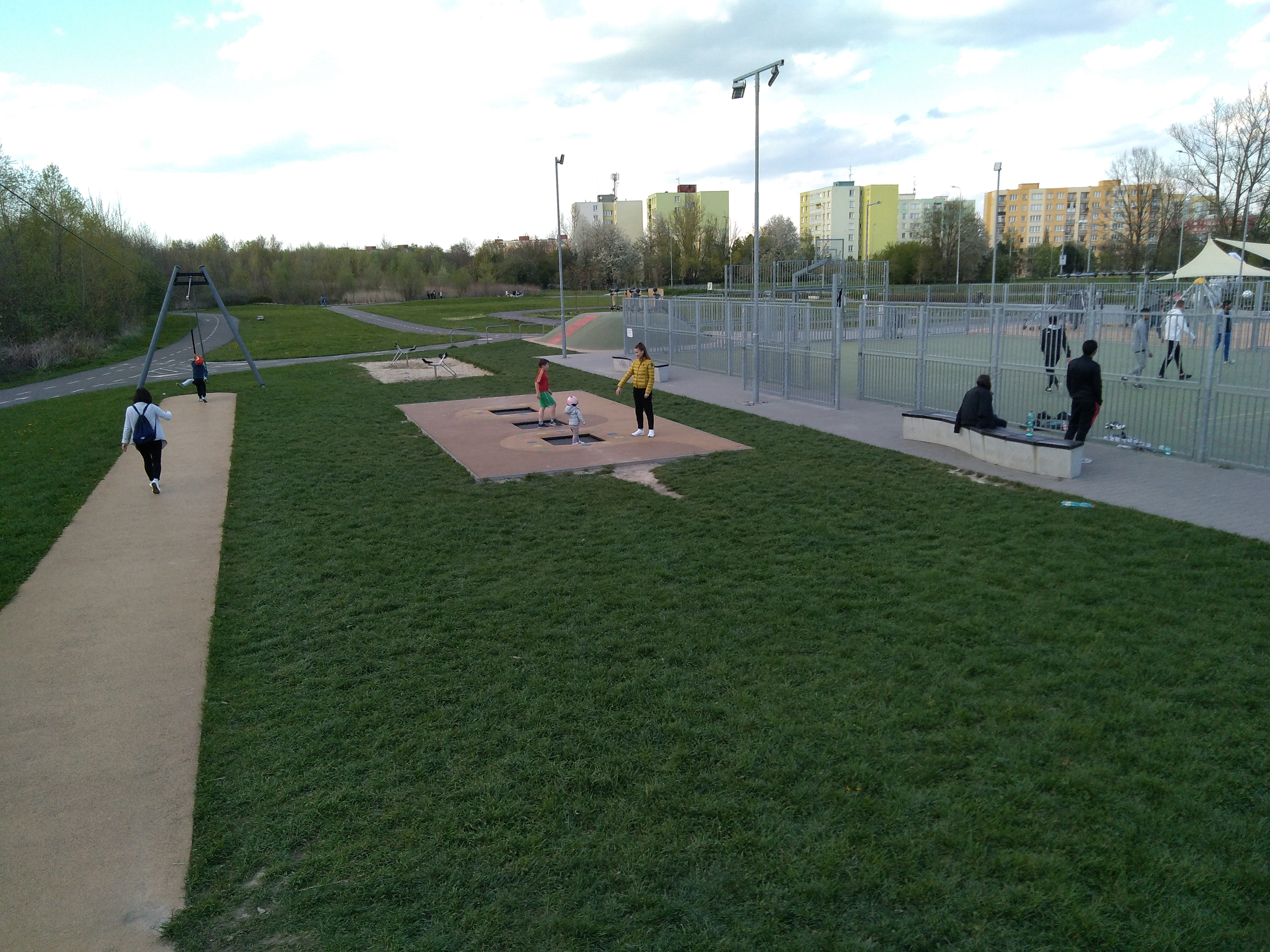
Sport park in Zábřeh

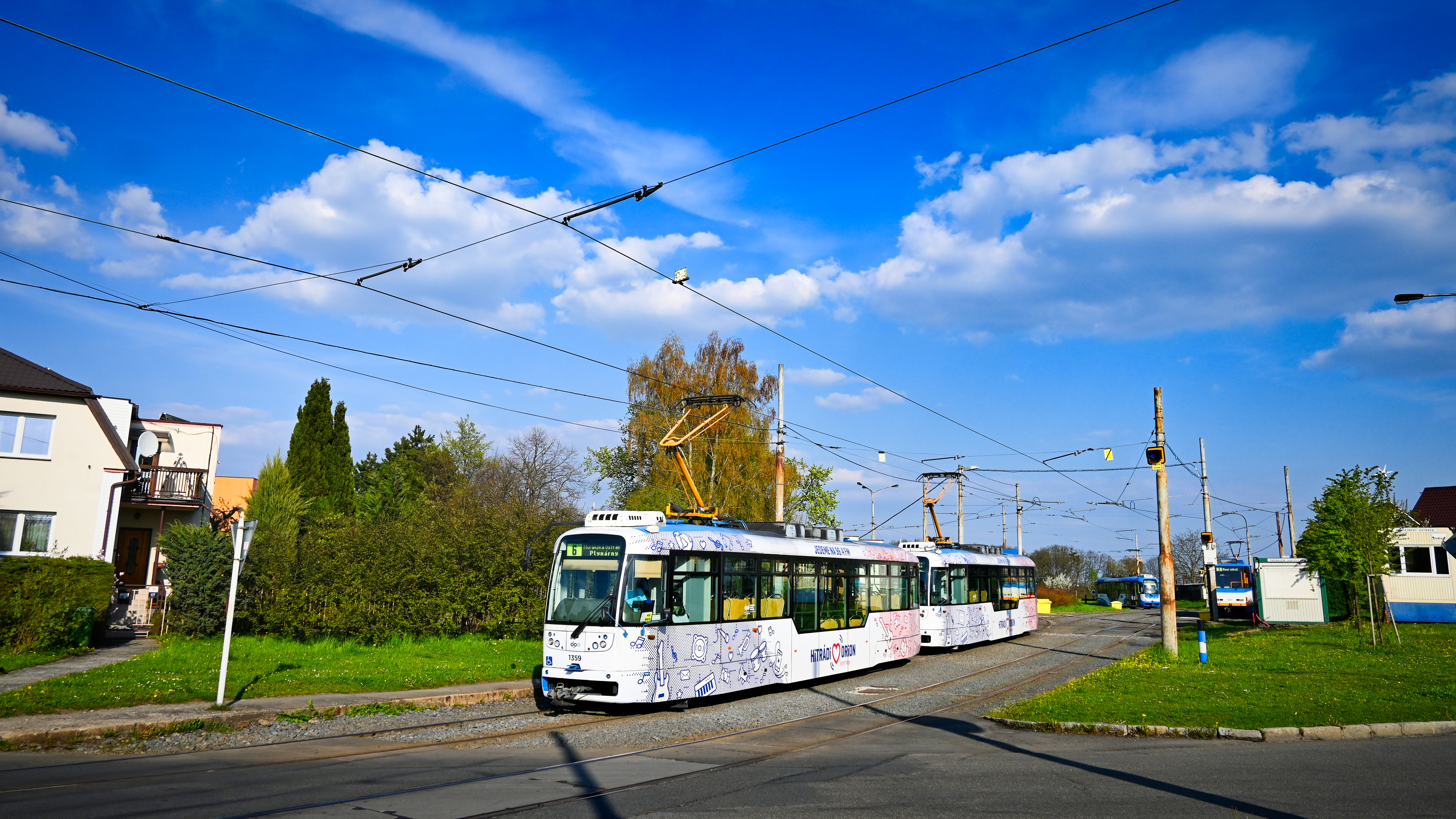
Trams in Výškovice
