= Výškovice =

- Municipal part of Ostrava
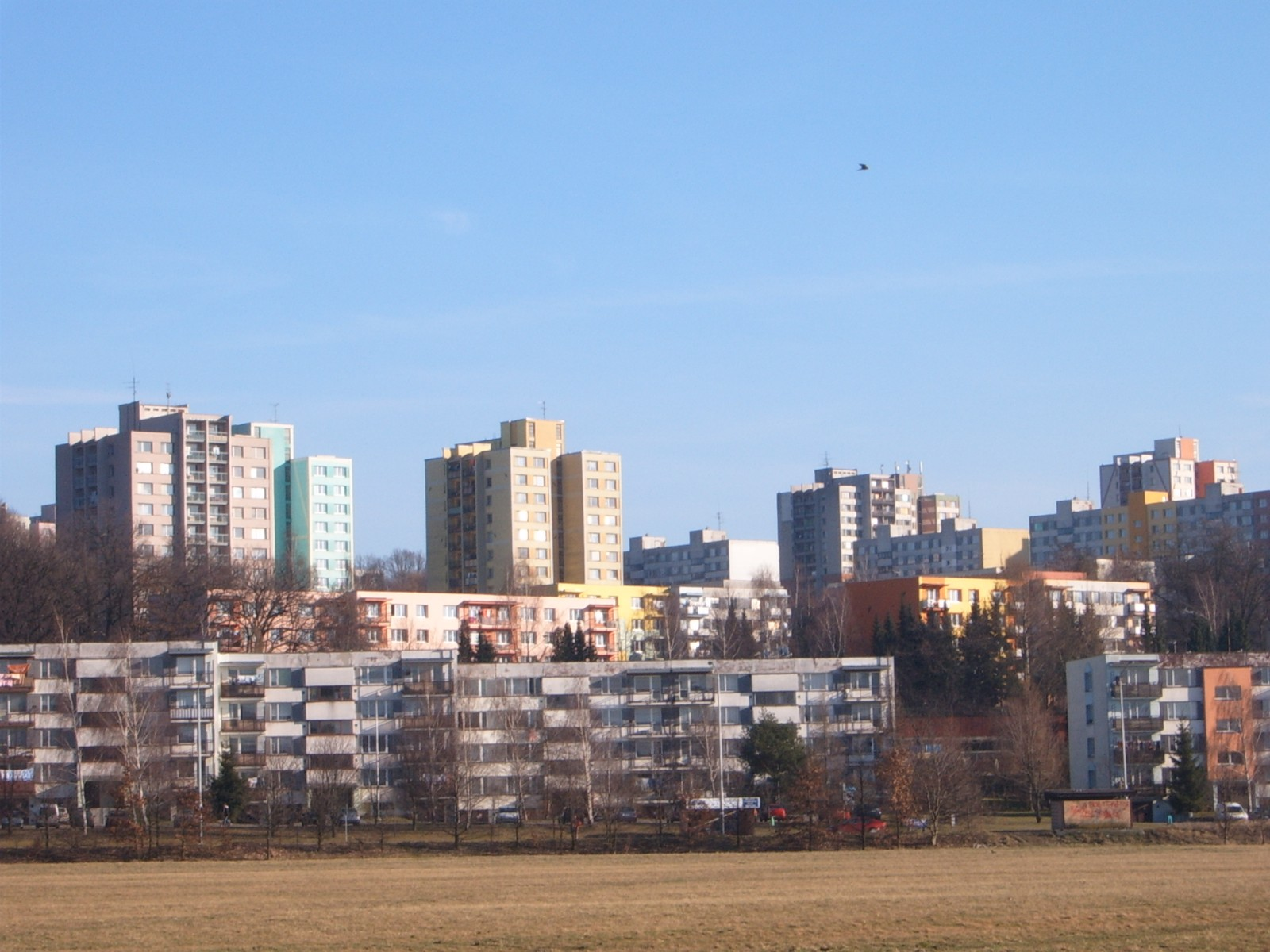
- Housing estate in Výškovice
- Interactive map of Výškovice
- Country: Czech Republic
- Region: Moravian-Silesian Region
- District: Ostrava-City
- City: Ostrava
- City district: Ostrava-Jih

Area
  - Total: 3.29 km^{2} (1.27 sq mi)

Population (2021)
  - Total: 12,821
  - Density: 3,900/km^{2} (10,100/sq mi)
- Time zone: UTC+1 (CET)
  - Summer (DST): UTC+2 (CEST)
- Postal code: 700 30

Výškovice is a municipal part of the city district of Ostrava-Jih in the city of Ostrava in the Czech Republic. It has 12,821 inhabitants.

== History ==
Výškovice originally was an agricultural village. In the 1960s, a development project to build new panel apartment blocks began in that area, and in 1966, Výškovice was incorporated into Ostrava. On 24 November 1990, Výškovice merged with Dubina, Hrabůvka, Zábřeh and Bělský Les to form one of the 23 self-governing boroughs of Ostrava, Ostrava-Jih.

== Demographics ==
Historical population

Year	Pop.	±%
1869	368	—
1880	437	+18.8%
1890	454	+3.9%
1900	550	+21.1%
1910	592	+7.6%
1921	567	−4.2%
1930	798	+40.7%
1950	772	−3.3%

Year	Pop.	±%
1961	869	+12.6%
1970	1,052	+21.1%
1980	17,122	+1527.6%
1991	18,295	+6.9%
2001	15,960	−12.8%
2011	13,945	−12.6%
2021	12,821	−8.1%

Source: Czech Statistical Office
