= Dubina (Ostrava) =

Coordinates: 49°46′29″N 18°15′13″E

- Municipal part of Ostrava
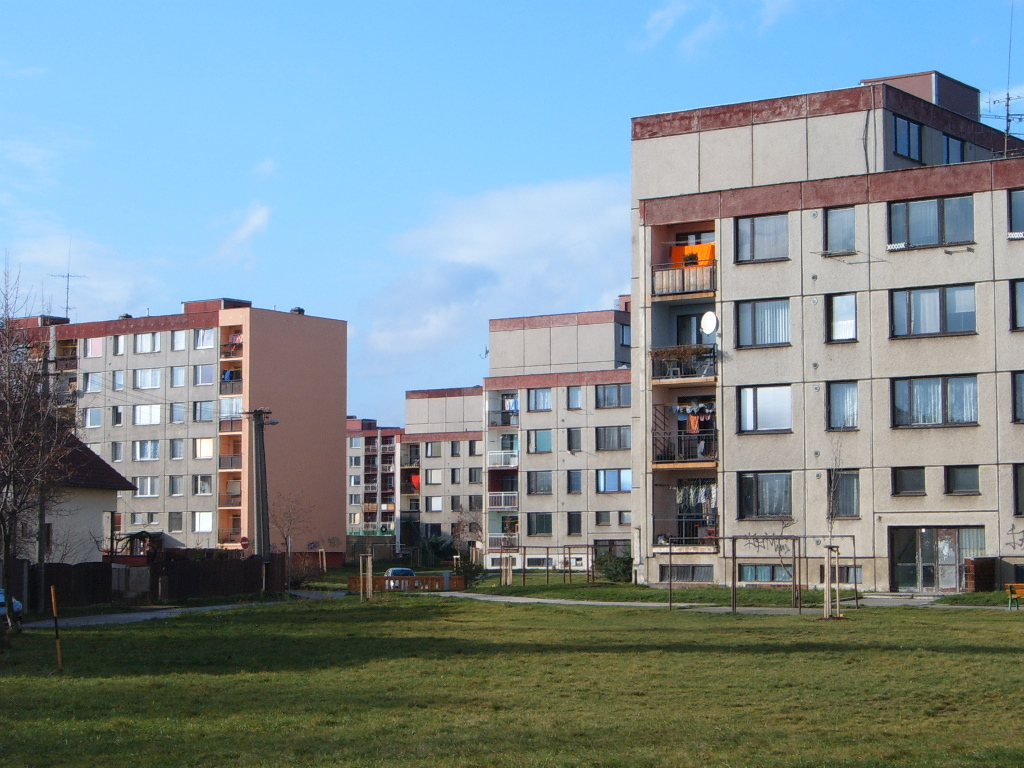
- Housing estate in Dubina
- Interactive map of Dubina
- Country: Czech Republic
- Region: Moravian-Silesian Region
- District: Ostrava-City
- City: Ostrava
- City district: Ostrava-Jih

Area
  - Total: 0.91 km^{2} (0.35 sq mi)

Population (2021)
  - Total: 12,589
  - Density: 14,000/km^{2} (36,000/sq mi)
- Time zone: UTC+1 (CET)
  - Summer (DST): UTC+2 (CEST)
- Postal code: 700 30

Dubina is a municipal part of the city district of Ostrava-Jih in the city Ostrava in the Czech Republic. It has 12,589 inhabitants.

== History ==
It was established on 1 January 1984 as a new part of Ostrava, and was built during the 1980s and 1990s. On 24 November 1990, Dubina merged with Hrabůvka, Zábřeh, Výškovice and Bělský Les to form one of the 23 self-governing boroughs of Ostrava.

== Demographics ==
Historical population

Year	Pop.	±%
1869	-	—
1880	-	—
1890	-	—
1900	-	—
1910	-	—
1921	-	—
1930	-	—
1950	-	—

Year	Pop.	±%
1961	-	—
1970	-	—
1980	-	—
1991	15,843	—
2001	17,623	+11.2%
2011	15,079	−14.4%
2021	12,589	−16.5%

Source: Czech Statistical Office
