= Bělský Les =

City part of Ostrava, Czech Republic

- Municipal part of Ostrava
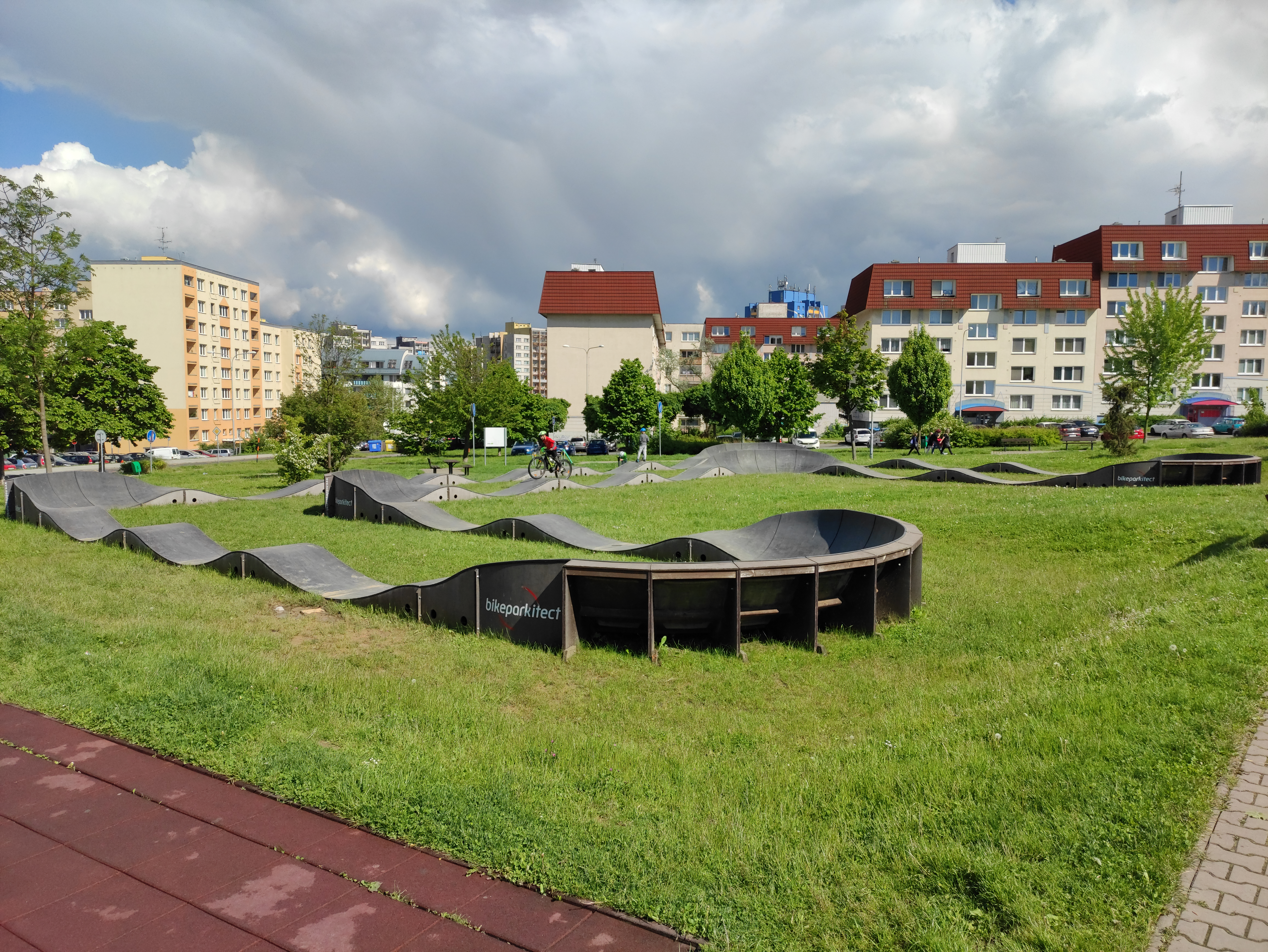
- Pump track in Bělský Les
- Interactive map of Bělský Les
- Country: Czech Republic
- Region: Moravian-Silesian Region
- District: Ostrava-City
- City: Ostrava
- City district: Ostrava-Jih

Area
  - Total: 0.5 km^{2} (0.19 sq mi)

Population (2021)
  - Total: 7,072
  - Density: 14,000/km^{2} (37,000/sq mi)
- Time zone: UTC+1 (CET)
  - Summer (DST): UTC+2 (CEST)
- Postal code: 700 30

Bělský Les is a municipal part of the city district of Ostrava-Jih in the city of Ostrava in the Czech Republic. It has 7,072 inhabitants.

== Etymology ==
It was named after a forest park in that area of the same name.

== History ==
During the 1980s and 1990s, a large of apartment panel buildings were constructed in that area. On 24 November 1990, Výškovice merged with Dubina, Hrabůvka, Zábřeh and Výškovice to form one of the 23 self-governing boroughs of Ostrava.

== Demographics ==
Historical population
Year	Pop.	±%
1991	2,758	—
2001	8,355	+202.9%
2011	8,676	+3.8%
2021	7,072	−18.5%
Source: Czech Statistical Office
