= Zábřeh (Ostrava) =

- Municipal part of Ostrava
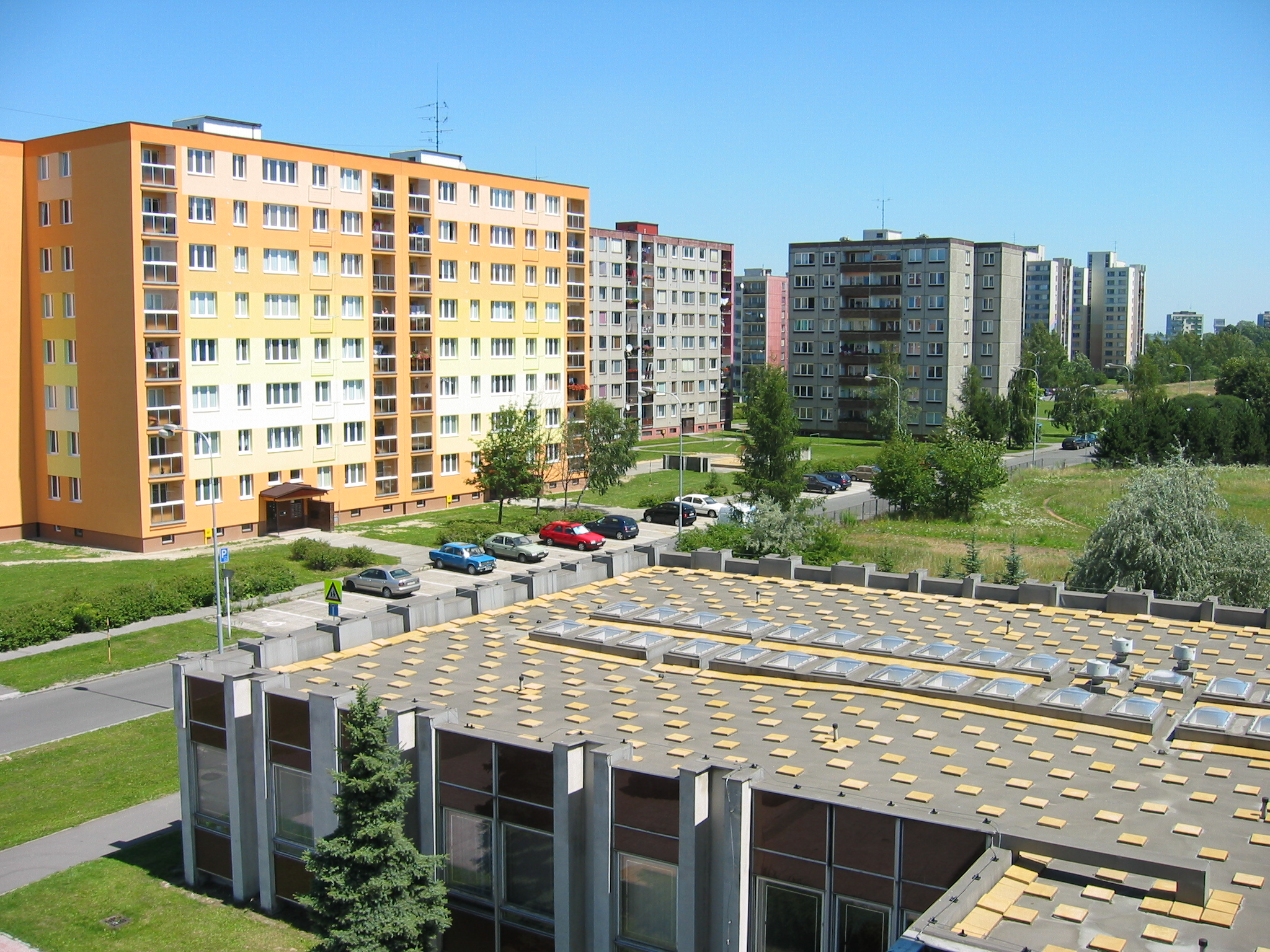
- Středoškolská street
- Interactive map of Zábřeh
- Country: Czech Republic
- Region: Moravian-Silesian Region
- District: Ostrava-City
- City: Ostrava
- City district: Ostrava-Jih

Area
  - Total: 7.44 km^{2} (2.87 sq mi)

Population (2021)
  - Total: 36,271
  - Density: 4,880/km^{2} (12,600/sq mi)
- Time zone: UTC+1 (CET)
  - Summer (DST): UTC+2 (CEST)
- Postal code: 700 30

Zábřeh is a municipal part of the city district of Ostrava-Jih in the city of Ostrava in the Czech Republic. It has 36,271 inhabitants.

== History ==
Originally a separate municipality, it was incorporated into Ostrava in 1924. From the 1960s to 1980s, a large number of panel apartment blocks were constructed in the area. In 2001, the Avion Shopping Park Ostrava, one of the largest shopping centres in the region, was opened in Zábřeh. On 24 November 1990, Zábřeh merged with Dubina, Hrabůvka, Výškovice and Bělský Les to form the Ostrava-Jih city borough of Ostrava.

== Demographics ==
Historical population

| Year | Pop. | ±% |
|---|---|---|
| 1869 | 1,178 | — |
| 1880 | 1,439 | +22.2% |
| 1890 | 3,209 | +123.0% |
| 1900 | 4,861 | +51.5% |
| 1910 | 6,182 | +27.2% |
| 1921 | 10,234 | +65.5% |
| 1930 | 9,146 | −10.6% |
| 1950 | 16,414 | +79.5% |

| Year | Pop. | ±% |
|---|---|---|
| 1961 | 21,963 | +33.8% |
| 1970 | 39,223 | +78.6% |
| 1980 | 34,177 | −12.9% |
| 1991 | 45,840 | +34.1% |
| 2001 | 44,601 | −2.7% |
| 2011 | 40,540 | −9.1% |
| 2021 | 36,271 | −10.5% |

Source: Czech Statistical Office
