= Hrabůvka (Ostrava) =

Coordinates: 49°47′16″N 18°15′34″E

- Municipal part of Ostrava
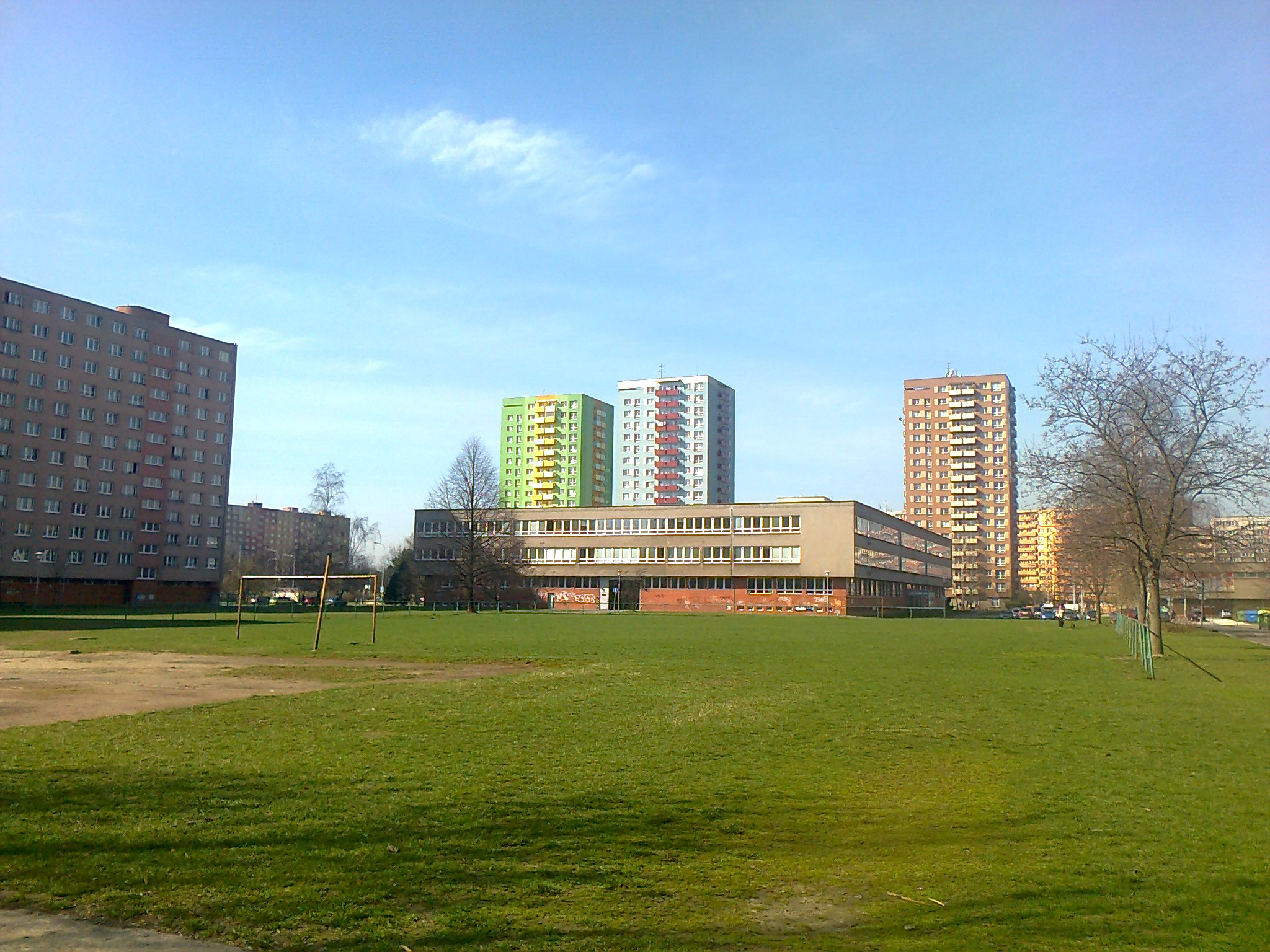
- Housing estate in Hrabůvka
- Interactive map of Hrabůvka
- Country: Czech Republic
- Region: Moravian-Silesian Region
- District: Ostrava-City
- City: Ostrava
- City district: Ostrava-Jih

Area
  - Total: 4.17 km^{2} (1.61 sq mi)

Population (2021)
  - Total: 28,118
  - Density: 6,740/km^{2} (17,500/sq mi)
- Time zone: UTC+1 (CET)
  - Summer (DST): UTC+2 (CEST)
- Postal code: 700 30

Hrabůvka is a municipal part of the city district of Ostrava-Jih in the city of Ostrava in the Czech Republic. It has 28,118 inhabitants.

== History ==
Originally a separate municipality, it was incorporated into Ostrava in 1924. From 1936 to 1959, Hrabůvka operated an airport, offering flights to several cities, including Prague and Košice. On 24 November 1990, Hrabůvka merged with Dubina, Zábřeh, Výškovice and Bělský Les to form the Ostrava-Jih borough, one of the 23 self-governing boroughs of Ostrava.

== Demographics ==
Historical population

Year	Pop.	±%
1869	583	—
1880	796	+36.5%
1890	1,502	+88.7%
1900	2,312	+53.9%
1910	3,032	+31.1%
1921	3,005	−0.9%
1930	5,155	+71.5%
1950	5,346	+3.7%

Year	Pop.	±%
1961	10,581	+97.9%
1970	30,473	+188.0%
1980	38,810	+27.4%
1991	36,070	−7.1%
2001	31,555	−12.5%
2011	28,733	−8.9%
2021	28,118	−2.1%

Source: Czech Statistical Office
