= Jan Fischer (politician) =

Czech politician (born 1951)

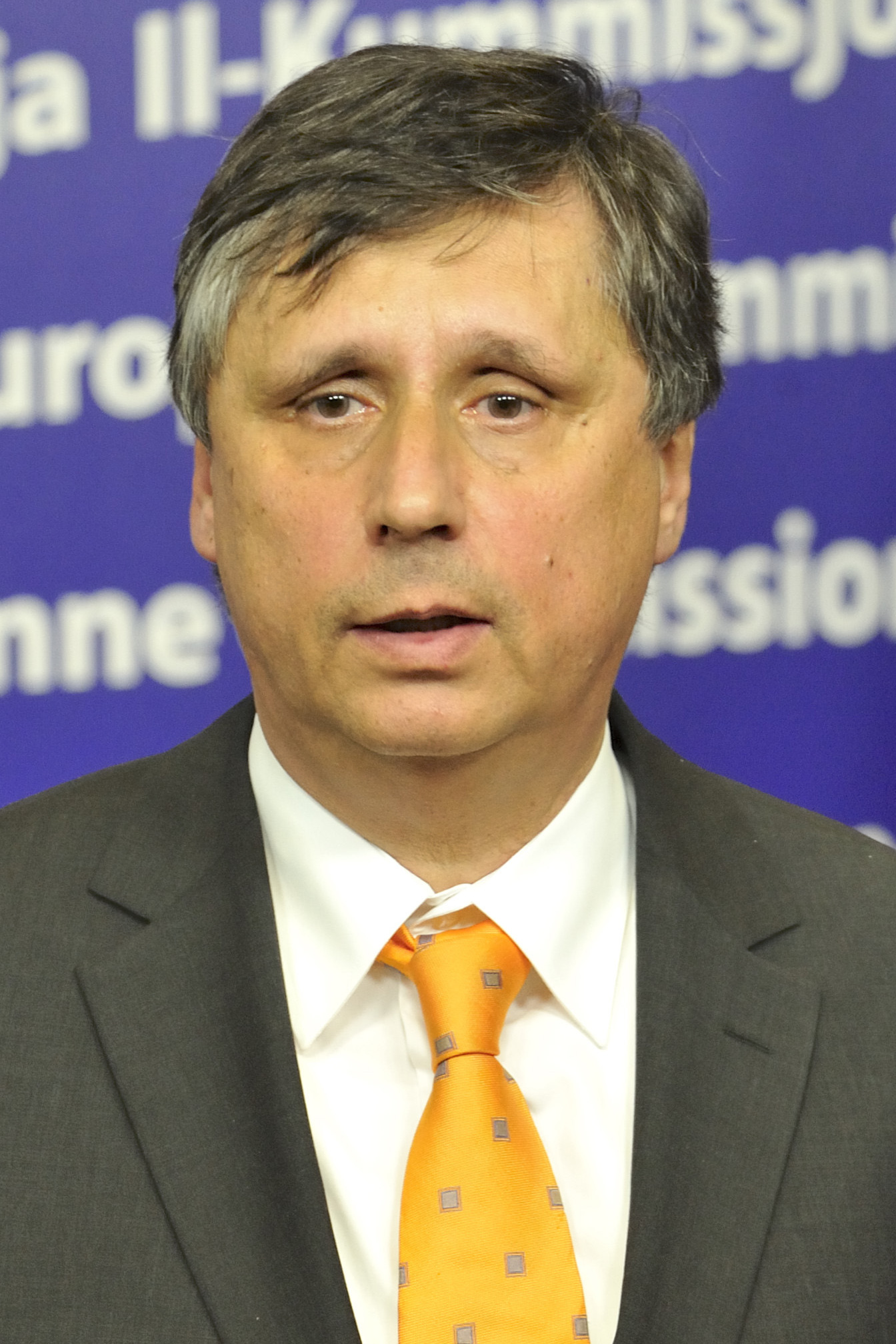
- Fischer in 2009

Prime Minister of the Czech Republic
- In office 9 April 2009 – 28 June 2010
- President: Václav Klaus
- Preceded by: Mirek Topolánek
- Succeeded by: Petr Nečas

Minister of Finance
- In office 10 July 2013 – 29 January 2014
- Prime Minister: Jiří Rusnok
- Preceded by: Miroslav Kalousek
- Succeeded by: Andrej Babiš

First Deputy Prime Minister of the Czech Republic
- In office 10 July 2013 – 29 January 2014
- Prime Minister: Jiří Rusnok
- Preceded by: Karel Schwarzenberg
- Succeeded by: Andrej Babiš

President of the Statistical Office
- In office 24 April 2003 – 27 July 2010
- Preceded by: Marie Bohatá
- Succeeded by: Iva Ritschelová

Personal details
- Born: 2 January 1951 (age 75) Prague, Czechoslovakia
- Party: Communist Party (1980–1989); Independent (1989–present)
- Spouse(s): Ivana Janecká (m. 1975; div. 1987) Dana Ulrichová (m. 1988)
- Children: 3
- Education: University of Economics

Jan Fischer (Czech pronunciation: [ˈjan ˈfɪʃɛr]; born 2 January 1951) is a Czech politician who served as the prime minister of the Czech Republic from April 2009 to July 2010, heading a caretaker government. Later he was the minister of Finance from July 2013 to January 2014 in another interim government of Jiří Rusnok.

A lifelong statistician, he served as president of the Czech Statistical Office beginning in April 2003.

In 2012, Fischer announced his candidacy for the 2013 presidential election. In the first round of the election, held in January 2013, he placed third with 16.35% of the vote (841,437 votes). He did not qualify for the second round.

== Biography ==
=== Personal life and education ===
Jan Fischer was born in Prague, Czechoslovakia. His father was a researcher at the Institute of Mathematics of the Czechoslovak Academy of Sciences specialising in mathematical and statistical applications in genetics, selective growing and medicine. His mother was also a statistician. His father, a Holocaust survivor, was Jewish, and his mother was Catholic. Raised in an interfaith household, Fischer identifies with Judaism.

Fischer graduated from the University of Economics, Prague in 1974 in statistics and econometrics. He completed postgraduate studies there in 1985, earning his Candidate of Sciences degree in economic statistics. He was a member of the Communist Party of Czechoslovakia from 1980 until the collapse of the Communist regime in 1989.

Jan Fischer is married for the second time to his former secretary and has 3 children. His eldest son Jakub (born 1978) is a professor of statistics and dean at the Faculty of Informatics and Statistics of the University of Economics, Prague.

=== Career ===
Immediately after graduation, Fischer joined the Federal Statistical Office. In 1990 he became its vice-chairman and held this position until the dissolution of Czechoslovakia, becoming the first vice-president of the newly established Czech Statistical Office. Since the beginning of the 1990s he led the team tallying the elections in the Czech Republic results. He appeared to be groomed to replace the long-time president Edvard Outrata who retired in August 1999; however the Social-Democratic government brought in an outsider from academia, Marie Bohatá. She fired Fischer in September 2000, whereupon he became Production Director of Taylor Nelson Sofres Factum. In 2001 he participated in an International Monetary Fund mission exploring possibilities of establishing a statistical bureau in East Timor. Since March 2002 he was a chief of research institutes at the Faculty of Informatics and Statistics of the University of Economics, Prague. After Bohatá resigned due to a scandal with a huge error in foreign trade balance, Fischer was appointed president of the Czech Statistical Office on 24 April 2003.

He is a member of the Czech Statistical Society, the Scientific Council and Board of Trustees and a Scientific Board of the Jan Evangelista Purkyně University in Ústí nad Labem. Since April 2011, he is also a member of the board of Bruegel, the European think tank for international economics.

=== Prime minister ===
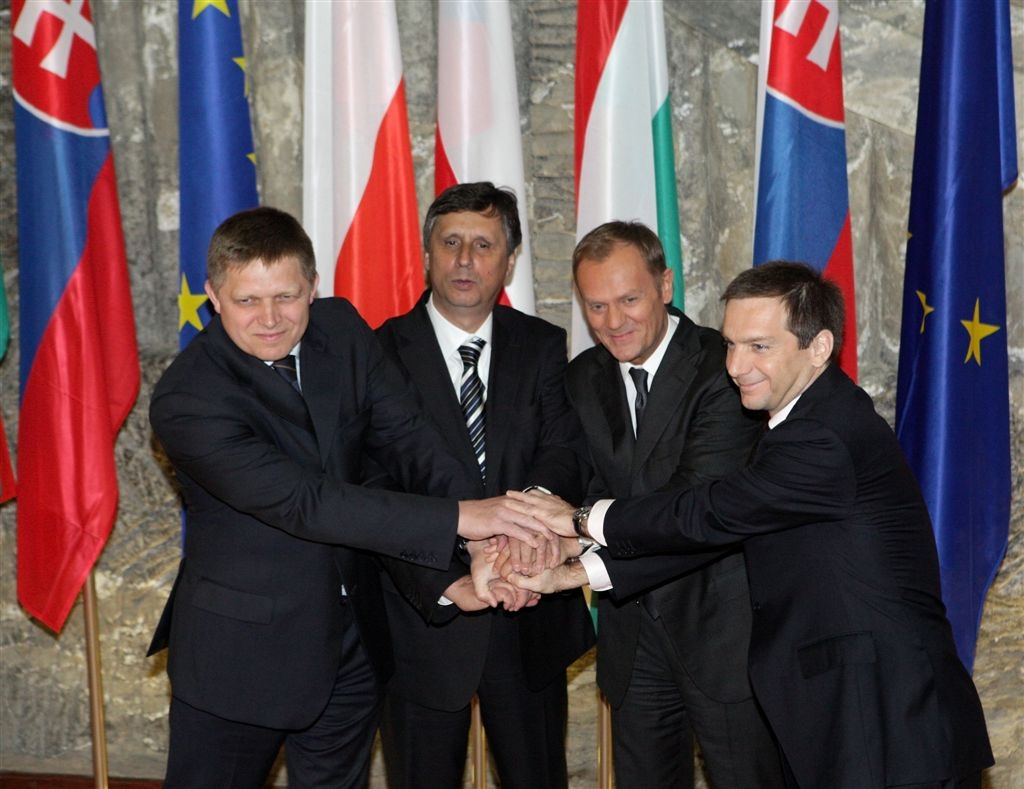
The leaders of the Visegrád Group: Robert Fico, Jan Fischer, Donald Tusk and Gordon Bajnai.

After the vote of no confidence of Mirek Topolánek's centre-right government in March 2009, in the middle of Czech Presidency of the European Union, Fischer was proposed to be the prime minister in April. He was nominated by Civic Democratic Party as independent. His government, nominated by both the Czech major parties (Topolánek's Civic Democratic Party and Czech Social Democratic Party) was inaugurated on 8 May 2009 on the understanding that the early election would be in October; however unexpected development in the Constitutional Court and House of Deputies postponed them to May 2010. Fischer decided to remain in the government, where he proved very popular, until then although the parties offered him a post in the European Commission.

He was a patron of the conference "Crimes of the Communist Regimes".

=== Candidate for President ===
In February 2012, Jan Fischer announced his candidacy for the presidential election of January 2013. He was, according to polls, the favourite of the election, along with former prime minister Miloš Zeman. However, he lost in the first round to Zeman and the foreign minister Karel Schwarzenberg. Prior to the election, he was criticised for his former membership in the Communist Party.

Government offices
Preceded by Marie Bohatá	President of the Czech Statistical Office; 2003–2010	Succeeded by Iva Ritschelová
Political offices
Preceded by Mirek Topolánek	Prime Minister of the Czech Republic; 2009–2010	Succeeded by Petr Nečas
Preceded by Mirek Topolánek	President of the European Council; 2009	Succeeded by Fredrik Reinfeldt
Preceded by Karel Schwarzenberg	First Deputy Prime Minister of the Czech Republic; 2013–2014	Succeeded by Andrej Babiš
Preceded by Miroslav Kalousek	Minister of Finance; 2013–2014	Succeeded by Andrej Babiš
