= Iva Ritschelová =

Czech economist and academic

Chair of the Czech Statistical Office
- In office 1 September 2010 – 2 December 2017
- President: Václav Klaus (2010–2013); Miloš Zeman (2013–2017)
- Prime Minister: Petr Nečas (2010–2013); Jiří Rusnok (2013–2014); Bohuslav Sobotka (2014–2017)
- Preceded by: Jan Fischer
- Succeeded by: Marek Rojíček

Personal details
- Born: 16 July 1964 Varnsdorf, Czechoslovakia
- Died: 2 December 2017 (aged 53) Czech Republic
- Children: 2
- Occupation: Academic; Economist

Iva Ritschelová (16 July 1964 – 2 December 2017) was a Czech economist and academic who served as chair of the central state statistical administration body Czech Statistical Office (CZSO) from 2010 to 2017. She had previously worked at the CZSO at its Ústí nad Labem branch in its Department of Environmental Statistics as well as the Czechoslovak Academy of Sciences and the Statistical Division of the United Nations' (UN) Food and Agriculture Organization. Ritschelová was also vice-rector and later rector of Jan Evangelista Purkyně University in Ústí nad Labem.

== Early life ==
On 16 July 1964, Ritschelová was born in Varnsdorf. She was brought up in Varnsdorf did her basic schooling there. Following Ritschelová's graduation from the Rumburk Grammar School, she enrolled at the Technical University of Liberec and studied Consumer Industry Economics. Ritschelová went on to earn a Candidate of Sciences degree from the Prague University of Economics and Business in 1993.

== Career ==
She briefly worked at the Czechoslovak Academy of Sciences and then at the Institute for the Environment in Ústí nad Labem from 1989 to 1992. After that, Ritschelová worked at the Department of Environmental Statistics that formed part of the central state statistical administration body Czech Statistical Office's (CZSO) Ústí nad Labem branch. Between 1998 and 2001, she worked in Rome for the Statistical Division of the United Nations' (UN) Food and Agriculture Organization. Ritschelová was part of UN missions in locations such as Kosovo from 2001 to 2002 and briefly worked in Germany, Poland, Russia and the United Kingdom. Following her return from Rome, she worked at the Jan Evangelista Purkyně University in Ústí nad Labem as vice-rector of Science, Research and International Relations. Ritschelová declined to be appointed the Minister of Education under the government led by Mirek Topolánek in October 2007. On 1 March of the same year, she was elected rector of the Jan Evangelista Purkyně University in Ústí nad Labem and she remained in the post until 28 February 2011.

On 1 September 2010, Ritschelová was appointed chair of the CZSO following a proposal made by the Czech government to Václav Klaus, the Czech President, replacing Jan Fischer. She was assisted by Jiří Madar, the Deputy Mayor of Ústí nad Labem. As the CZSO's chair, Ritschelová promoted a significant modernisation of the processes of producing statistics in the Czech Republic, which included the transtition of gathering data electronically. The result of which lowered the overall workload for statistical surveys by 35 per cent. She actively encouraged the promotion of literacy of statistics to the general Czech public. Ritschelová authored multiple publications concerning the economic aspects of environmental economy and environmental policy. She focused her scientific career on macroeconomic aspects with relation to creating and protecting the environment and environmental economics and also partook in developing a Czech-wide statistical environmental system.

Ritschelová was appointed associate professor in 2000, and was promoted to full professor on 20 November 2012. She was also a patriot of the region of North Bohemia and she was additionally a benefactor of Ústí nad Labem's Children's Home. Ritschelová was the Czech Republic's representative at the 2013 World Statistical Congress held in Hong Kong.

== Personal life ==
She was married and has two children. On the late evening of 2 December 2017, Ritschelová died from a severe illness.

== Legacy ==
Honorary citizenship of Varnsdorf was posthumously granted to Ritschelová by Varnsdorf City Council in September 2019.
