= Nová Bělá =

Borough of Ostrava, Czech Republic

- Borough of Ostrava
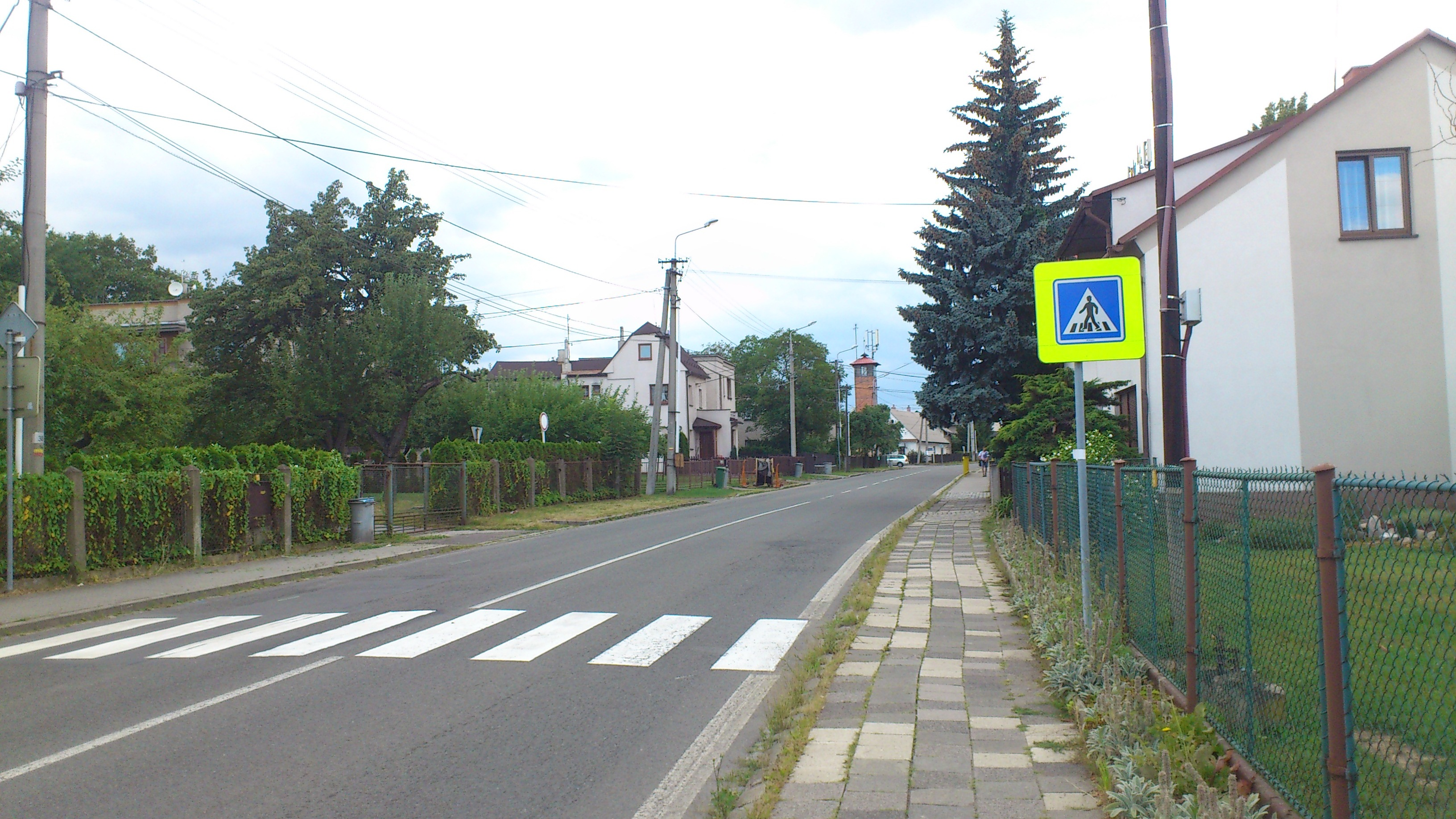
- Main street

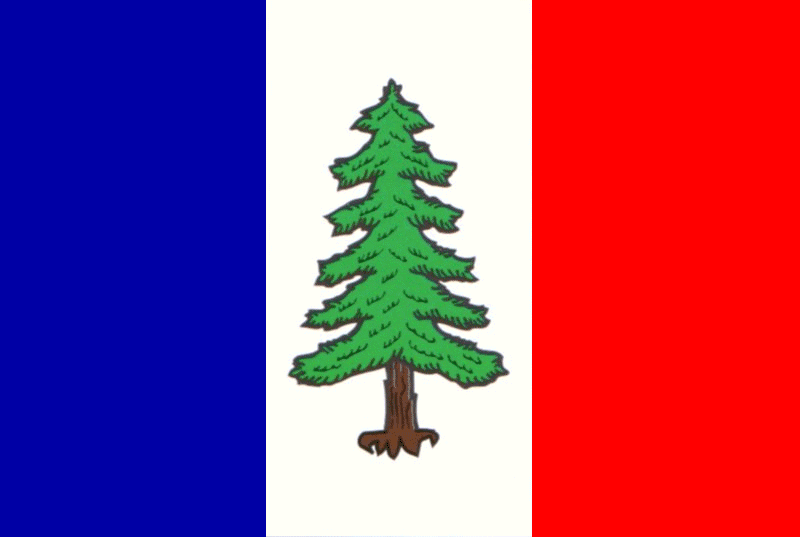
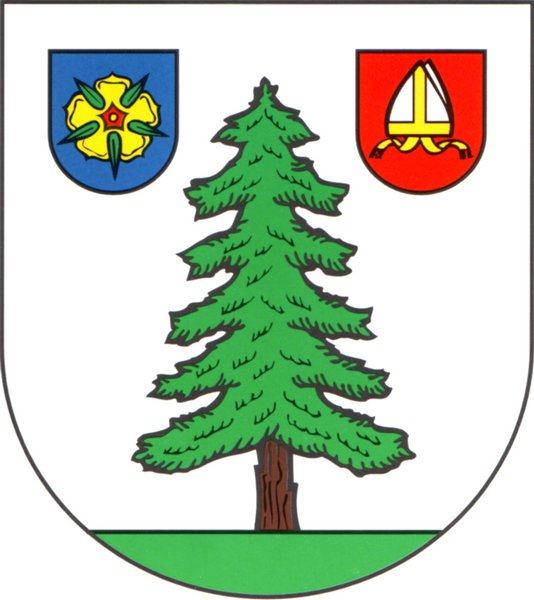
- Flag Coat of arms

- Location of Nová Bělá in Ostrava
- Coordinates: 49°45′13″N 18°15′15″E
- Country: Czech Republic
- Region: Moravian-Silesian
- Municipality: Ostrava

Area
  - Total: 7.18 km^{2} (2.77 sq mi)

Population (2021)
  - Total: 2,207
  - Density: 307/km^{2} (796/sq mi)
- Time zone: UTC+1 (CET)
  - Summer (DST): UTC+2 (CEST)
- Postal code: 724 00
- Website: www.novabela.cz

Nová Bělá is a borough and municipal part of the city of Ostrava in the Czech Republic. It is situated in the southern part of the city. Originally, it was a separate municipality, until it merged with Ostrava in 1941. In 1954, Nová Bělá separated from Ostrava and remained independent until 1 January 1975, when it became part of the city once again. On 24 November 1990, it became one of the 23 self-governing boroughs of Ostrava.

== Etymology ==
The name is derived from the Bělá Stream, which flows through the area. The word bělá comes from the Czech adjective bílý, meaning 'white' – hence, the name refers to a 'white stream'. The adjective nová (meaning 'new') was added to distinguish the municipality from its older neighbour, Stará Bělá.

== Gallery ==
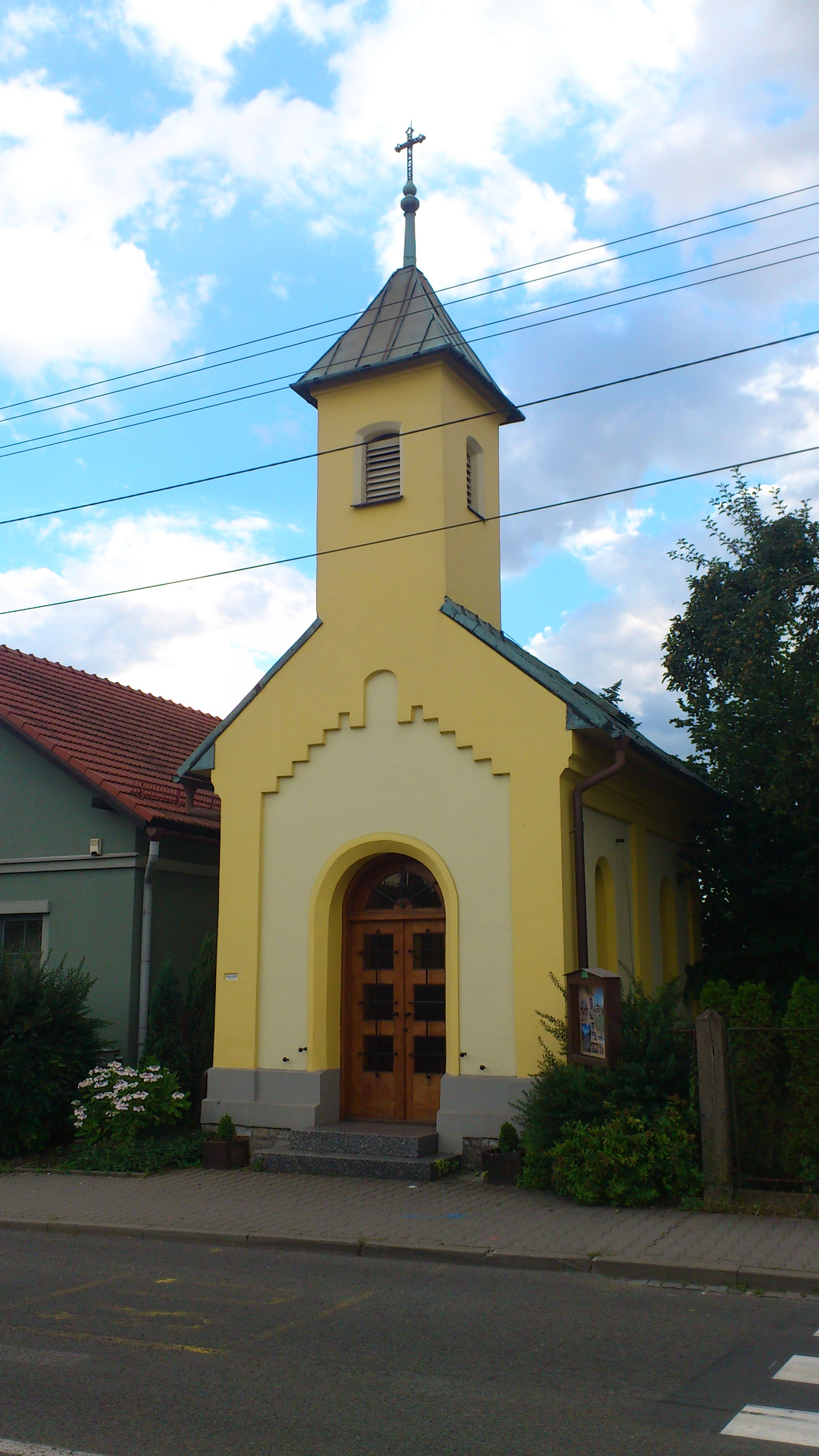
Chapel

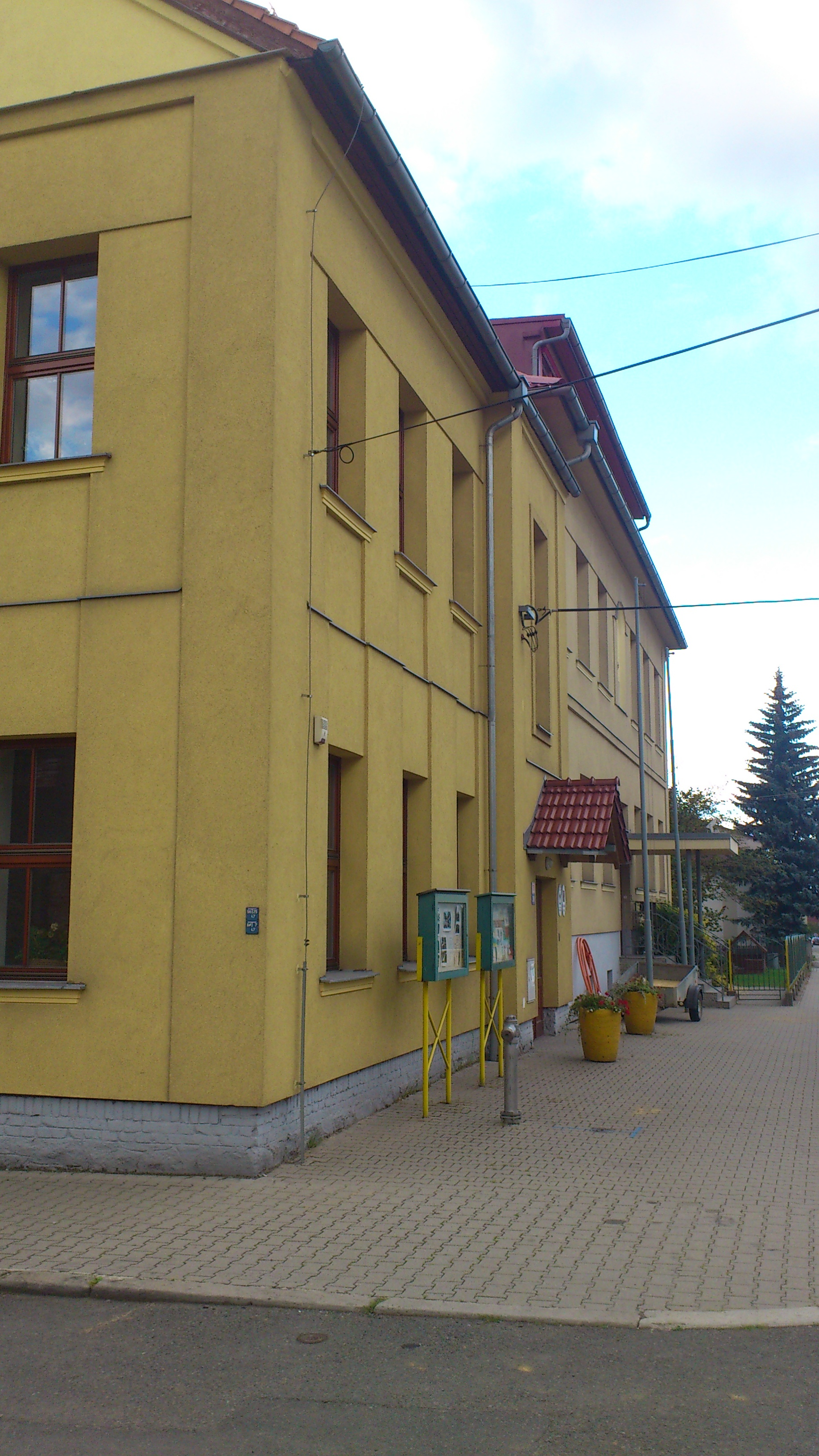
Primary school
