= Stará Bělá =

Municipality in Ostrava, Czech Republic

- Borough of Ostrava
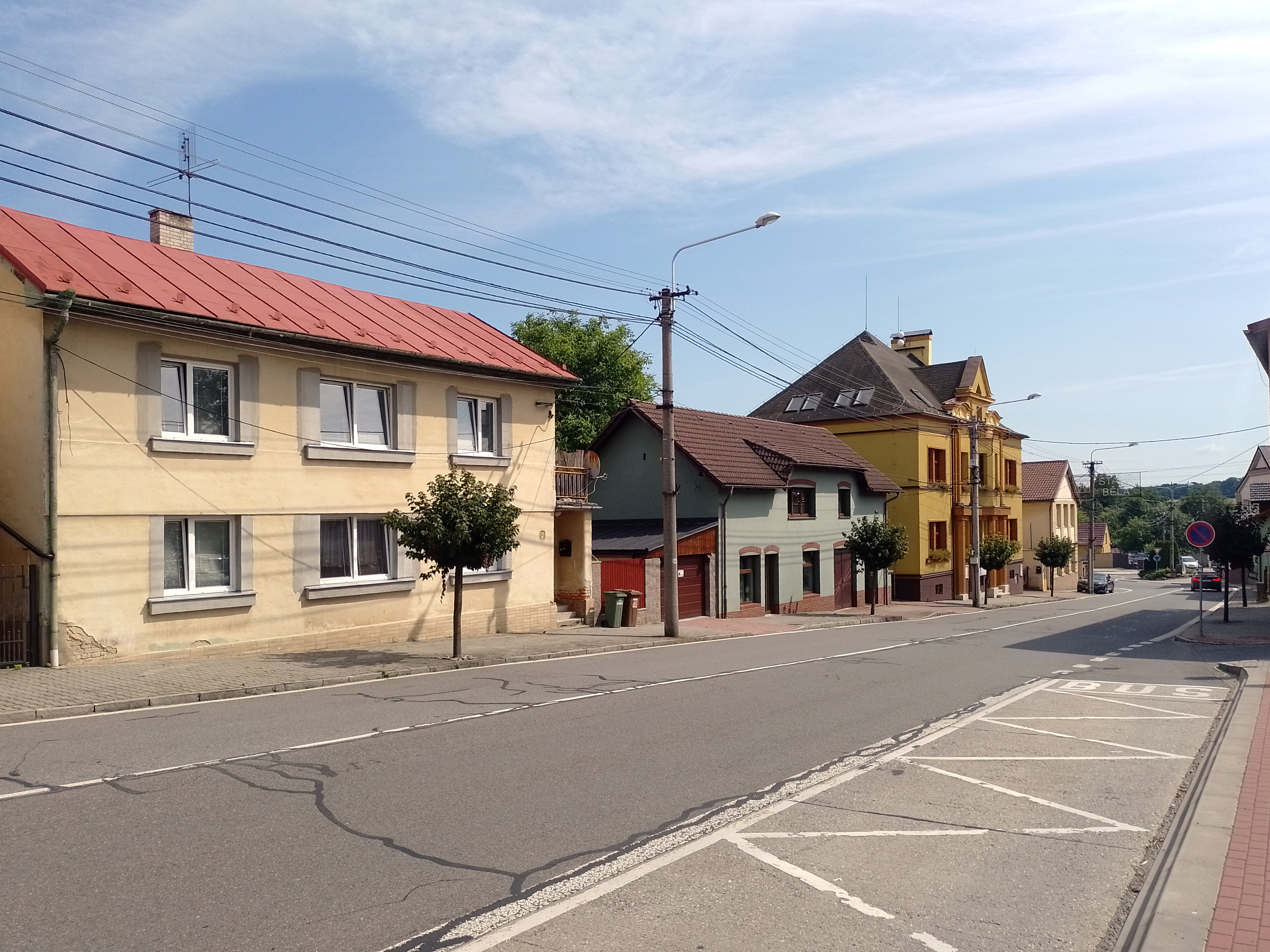
- Junácká street

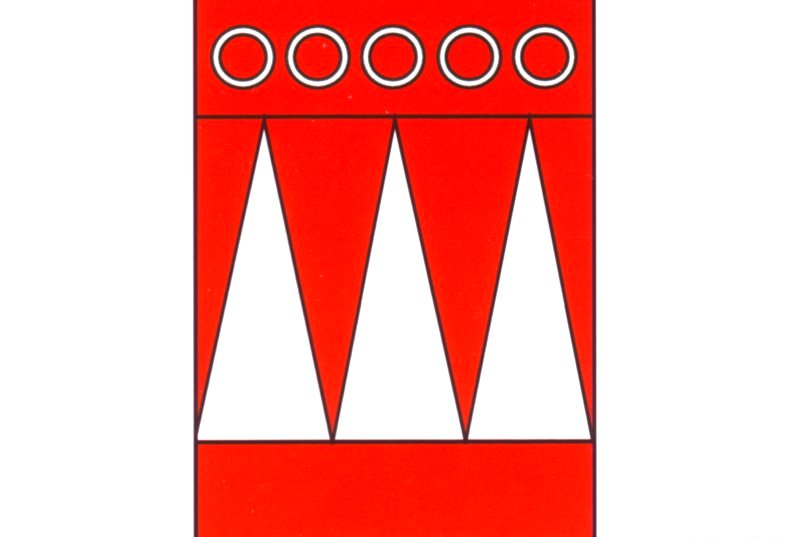
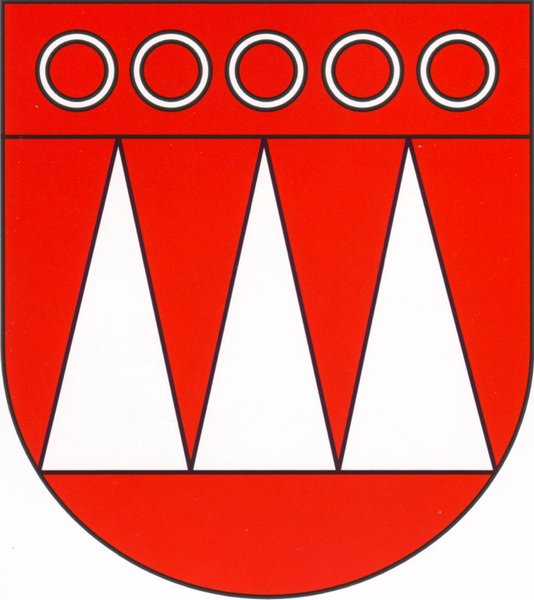
- Flag Coat of arms

- Location of Stará Bělá in Ostrava
- Coordinates: 49°45′41″N 18°14′17″E
- Country: Czech Republic
- Region: Moravian-Silesian
- Municipality: Ostrava

Area
  - Total: 13.93 km^{2} (5.38 sq mi)

Population (2021)
  - Total: 3,980
  - Density: 286/km^{2} (740/sq mi)
- Time zone: UTC+1 (CET)
  - Summer (DST): UTC+2 (CEST)
- Postal code: 724 00
- Website: starabela.ostrava.cz

Stará Bělá is a borough and municipal part of the city of Ostrava in the Czech Republic. It is situated in the southern part of the city. Originally, it was a separate municipality, until it merged with Ostrava in 1945. In 1954, Stará Bělá separated from Ostrava and remained independent until 1975. From 1960 to 1975, it belonged to the Frýdek-Místek District. In 1975, Stará Bělá became part of Ostrava once again. On 24 November 1990, it became one of the 23 self-governing boroughs of Ostrava.

== Etymology ==
The name is derived from the Bělá Stream, which flows through the area. The word bělá comes from the Czech adjective bílý, meaning 'white' – hence, the name refers to a 'white stream'. The adjective stará (meaning 'old') was added to distinguish the municipality from its younger neighbour, Nová Bělá.

== Gallery ==
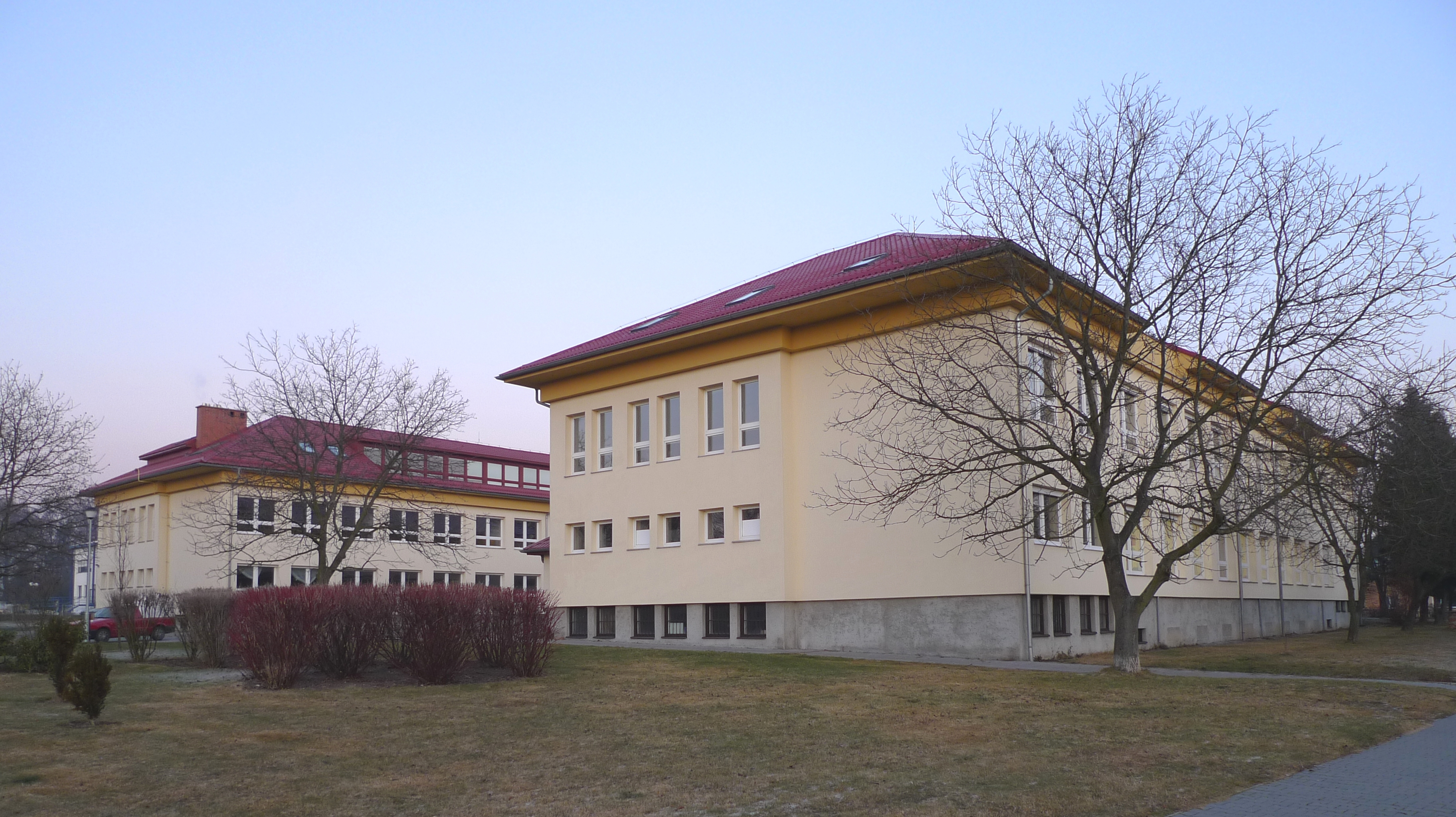
Primary school

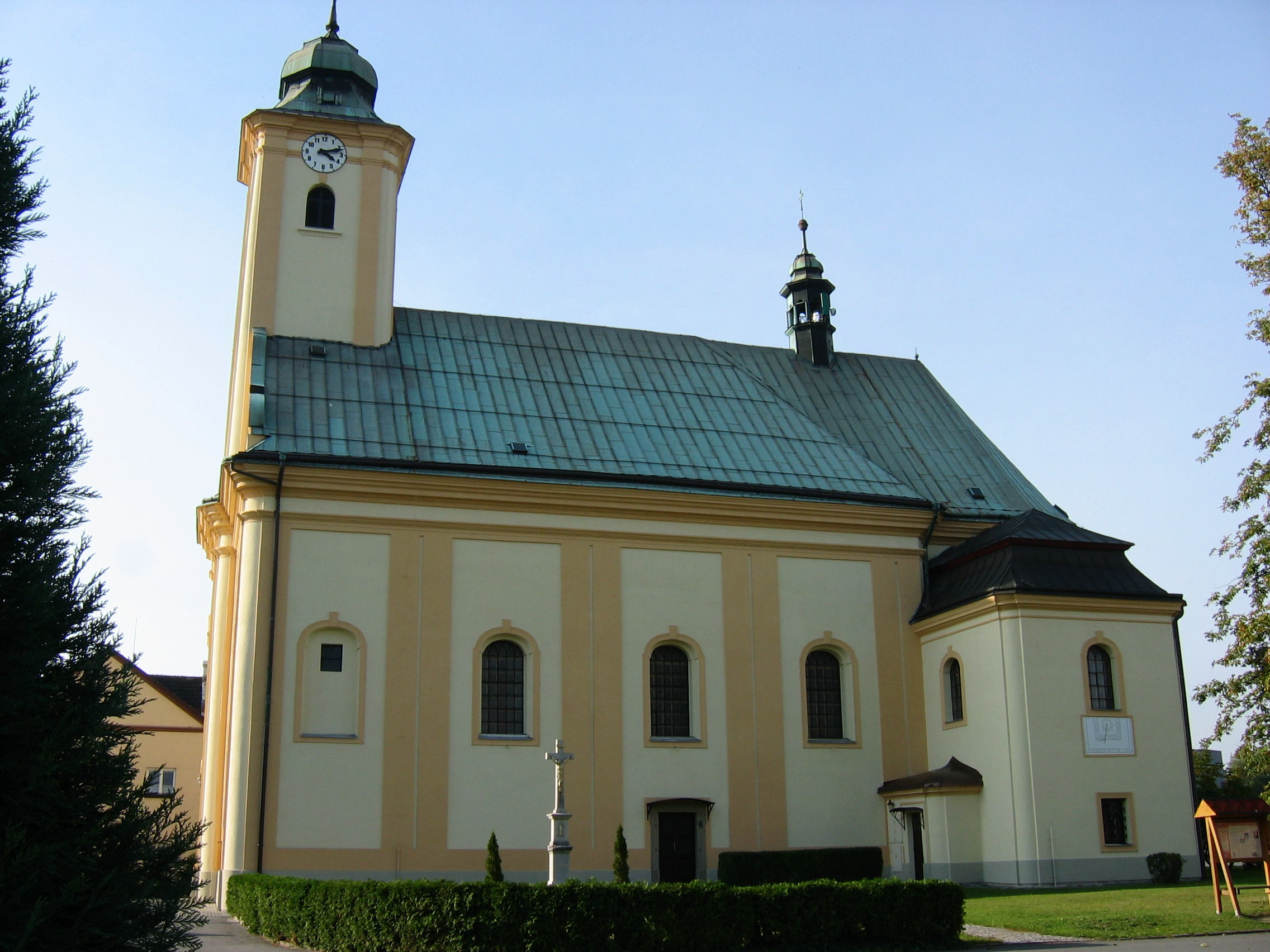
Church of Saint John of Nepomuk
