= Jan Evangelista Purkyně University in Ústí nad Labem =

University in Ústí nad Labem, Czech Republic

Jan Evangelista University in Ústí nad Labem
- Univerzita Jana Evangelisty Purkyně v Ústí nad Labem
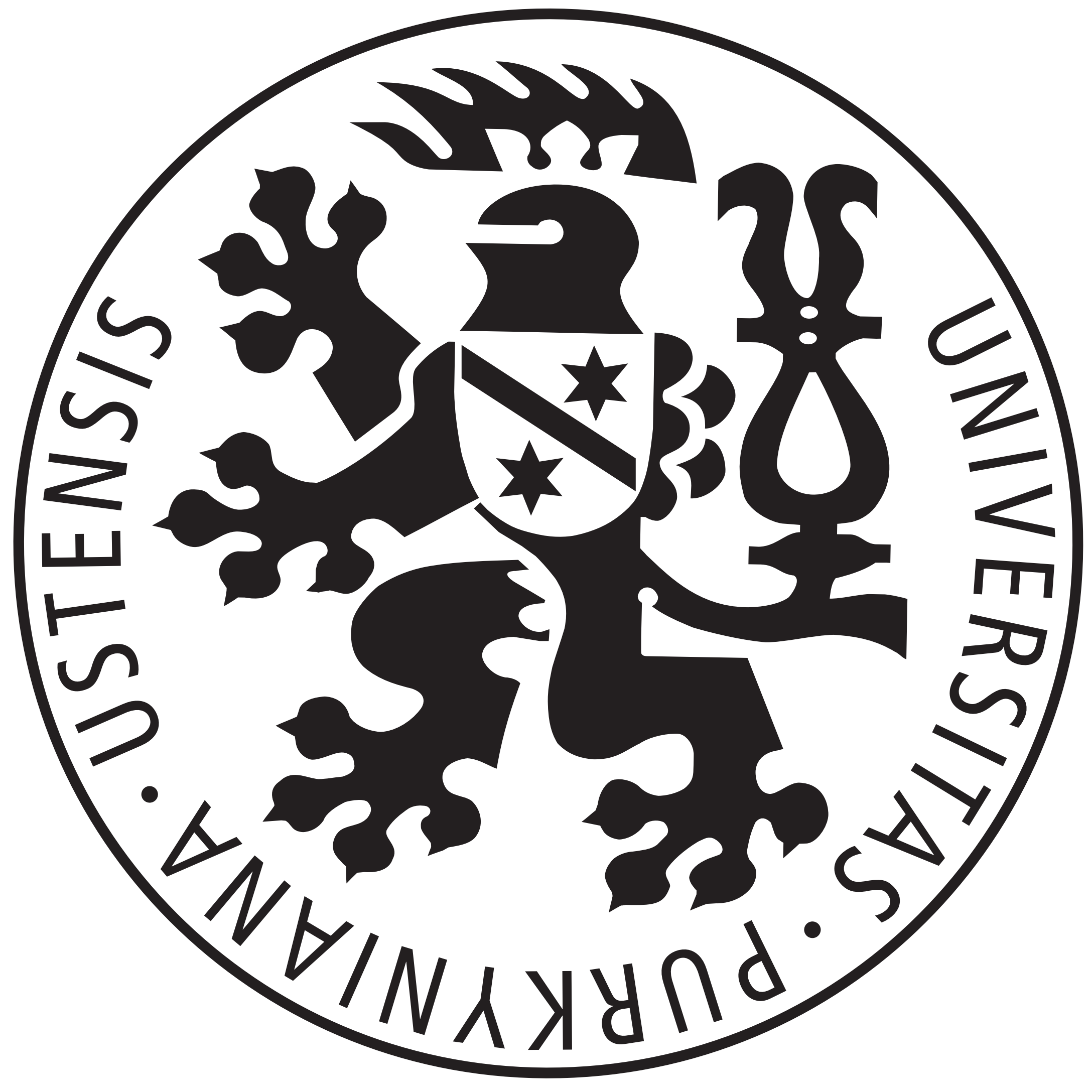
- Type: Public
- Established: 1991
- Rector: Jaroslav Koutský
- Students: ~8,500
- Location: Ústí nad Labem, Czech Republic; 50°40′31.88″N 14°2′7.44″E
- Website: www.ujep.cz/en/

University rankings

Regional – Overall
- QS Emerging Europe and Central Asia: 301–350 (2022)

Jan Evangelista Purkyně University in Ústí nad Labem (Czech: Univerzita Jana Evangelisty Purkyně v Ústí nad Labem, abbreviated as UJEP) is a public university in Ústí nad Labem in the Czech Republic. The institution was established on 28 September 1991. It bears the name of famous Czech scientist Jan Evangelista Purkyně who was born in nearby Libochovice. About 8,500 students are studying at the university. UJEP has around 900 employees.

== History ==
Originally, in 1954, the pedagogical high school was established; in 1964 it changed to the Faculty of Education. With Act No. 314/1991 of the Czech National Council, the university was established. The formal inauguration ceremony was held on 28 September 1991.

This university consists of eight faculties of which the Faculty of Education, the Faculty of Social and Economic Studies, the Faculty of the Environment and the Institute of Slavonic and German Studies were the first parts of the university.

== Location ==
The university is near the German border in Ústí nad Labem. It is in the centre of the city with its many faculties and halls of residence. The city cooperates with UJEP with aims to create a new university campus that will take the place of the former Masaryk Hospital.

== Structure ==
The self-governing academic bodies of the university include:

- Academic Senate
- Rector
- Scientific Council
- Disciplinary Board
- Board of Trustees
- Bursar (University Bookshop, Economic Department, Administration of Residential Halls and Canteens)
- Faculties and Institutes
