= Czech Statistical Office =

Czech governmental institution

Coordinates: 50°4′12″N 14°30′28″E

- Český statistický úřad ČSÚ

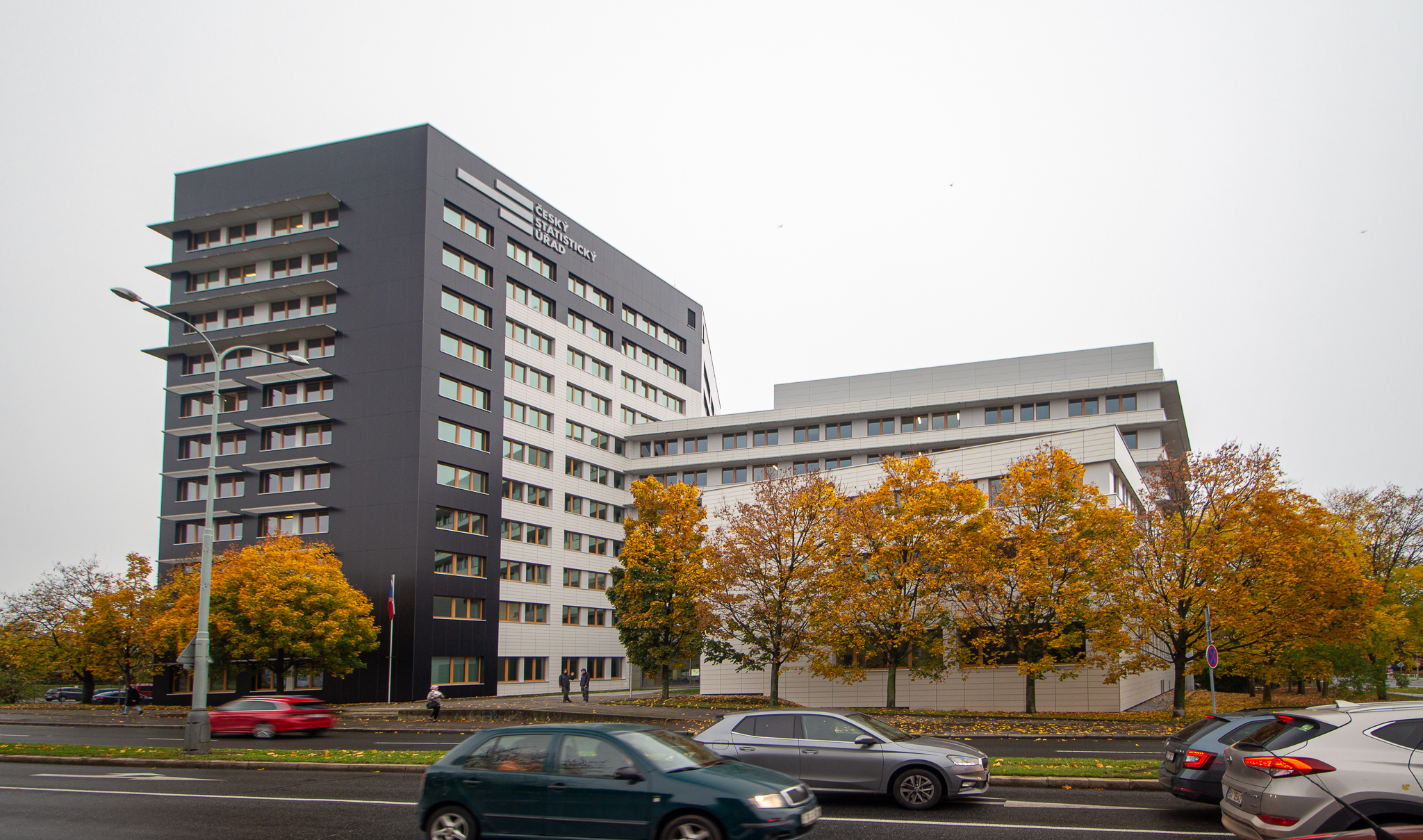
- CSO headquarters in Prague

Agency overview
- Formed: historical: 1969 modern: 1995
- Headquarters: Na padesátém 81, Prague 10-Strašnice
- Minister responsible: None – independent office
- Agency executive: Marek Rojíček, President
- Website: csu.gov.cz

The Czech Statistical Office (abbreviated CSO or CZSO; Czech: Český statistický úřad, abbreviated ČSÚ) is a central state administration authority of the Czech Republic. It is an office independent of the country's government, whose main tasks are the collection, processing and dissemination of statistical data and the organisation of elections in the Czech Republic and the population census.

== History ==
The beginnings of the organized statistical service in Czechoslovakia date to 28 January 1919, when the National Assembly of the Czechoslovak Republic approved the Act on the Statistical Service (No. 49/1919 Coll. of Laws n. "on the organisation of the statistical service"). The law defined the newly office called State Statistical Office as a state institution with its rights and obligations. The main task of the office was the collection and publication of basic demographic, social and economic data on the development of Czechoslovak society. Dobroslav Krejčí became the first president of the office. In 1961, the State Statistical Office and the Central People's Control Commission were merged into the Central Office of State Control and Statistics. The State Statistical Office became independent again in 1967, but already in 1969 it was transformed into the Federal Statistical Office.

The Czech Statistical Office was founded in 1969, when it was created by the Act of the Czech National Council No. 2/1969 as a body of the Czech Socialist Republic. After the partition of Czechoslovakia in 1993, the Czech Statistical Office took over some of the duties of the Federal Statistical Office. In 1995, the obligations and competences were revised by the new Act No. 89/1995 Coll. on the State Statistical Service.

== Competence of the office ==
The competence of the Czech Statistical Office is defined by Act No. 89/1995 Coll. The most important tasks of the office include:

- Determination of the methodology of statistical surveys and taking care of statistical surveys;
- Compilation of national accounts;
- Creation of macroeconomic analysis and analysis of selected characteristics of the social, economic, demographic and ecological development of the Czech Republic and its regions;
- Publishing and providing statistical information;
- Monitoring of statistics on the state and movement of the population and projection of the demographic development;
- Cooperation with international organisations, participation in the creation of statistics of the European Union;
- Organisation of elections in the Czech Republic;
- Coordination of the state statistical service, which is carried out by the ministries;
- Administration of the basic register of people.

== Office seat ==
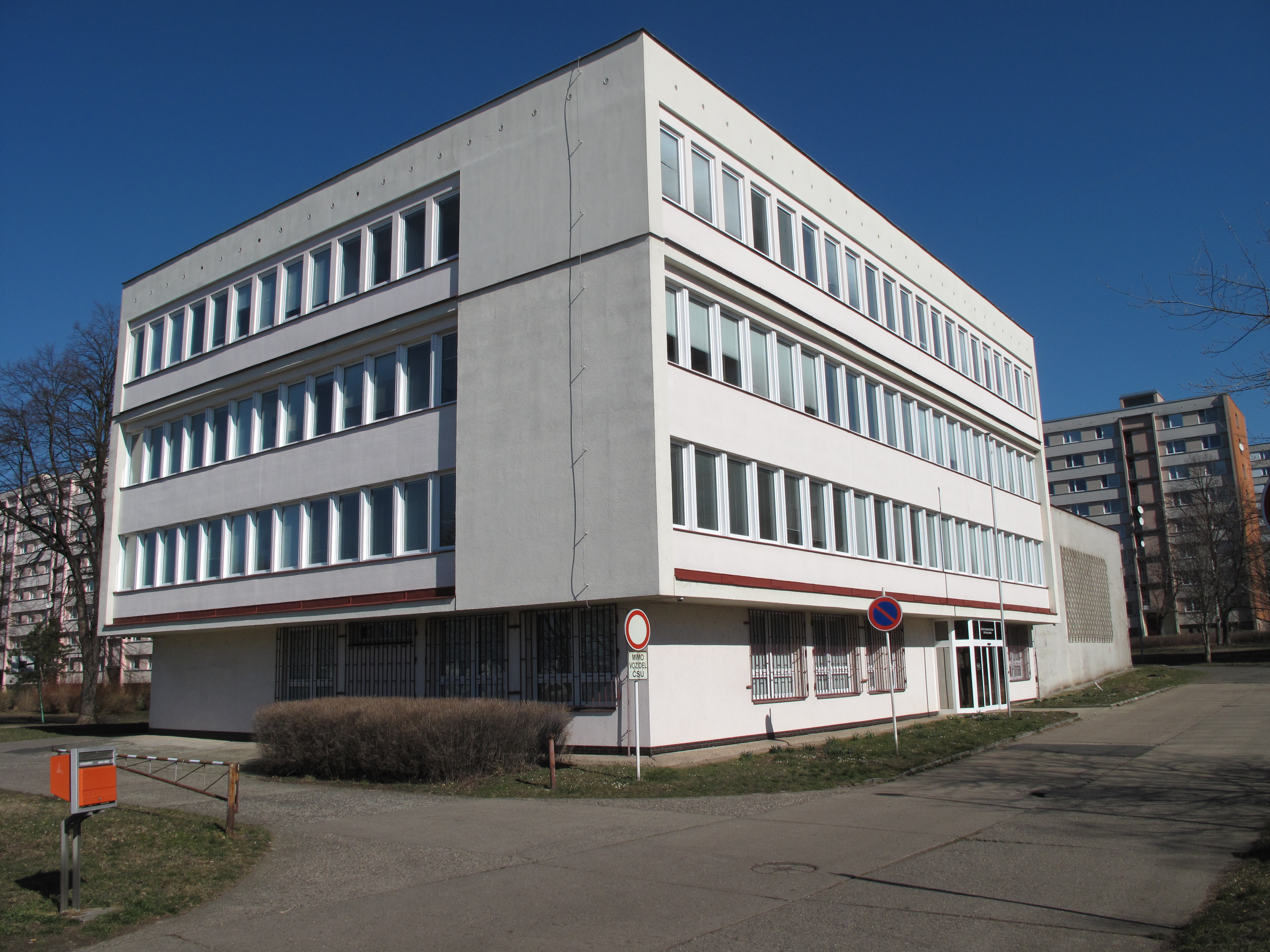
Branch of the Czech Statistical Office in the Ústí nad Labem Region

Until 2002, the Czech Statistical Office was based in Prague 8-Karlín. As a result of the 2002 European floods, the building was destroyed and the office moved to a new building in Prague 10-Strašnice, which was opened on 29 January 2004. In addition to the headquarters, the office has a branch in every region of the Czech Republic (except for the Central Bohemian Region, whose branch is part of the headquarters in Prague).

== List of presidents ==
- 1969–1987: Jiří Antoš
- 1987–1989: Ladislav Říha
- 1990–1993: Eduard Souček
- 1993–1999: Edvard Outrata
- 1999–2003: Marie Bohatá
- 2003–2010: Jan Fischer
- 2010–2017: Iva Ritschelová
- 2018– : Marek Rojíček
