= Statutory city (Czech Republic) =

Type of municipality in the Czech Republic

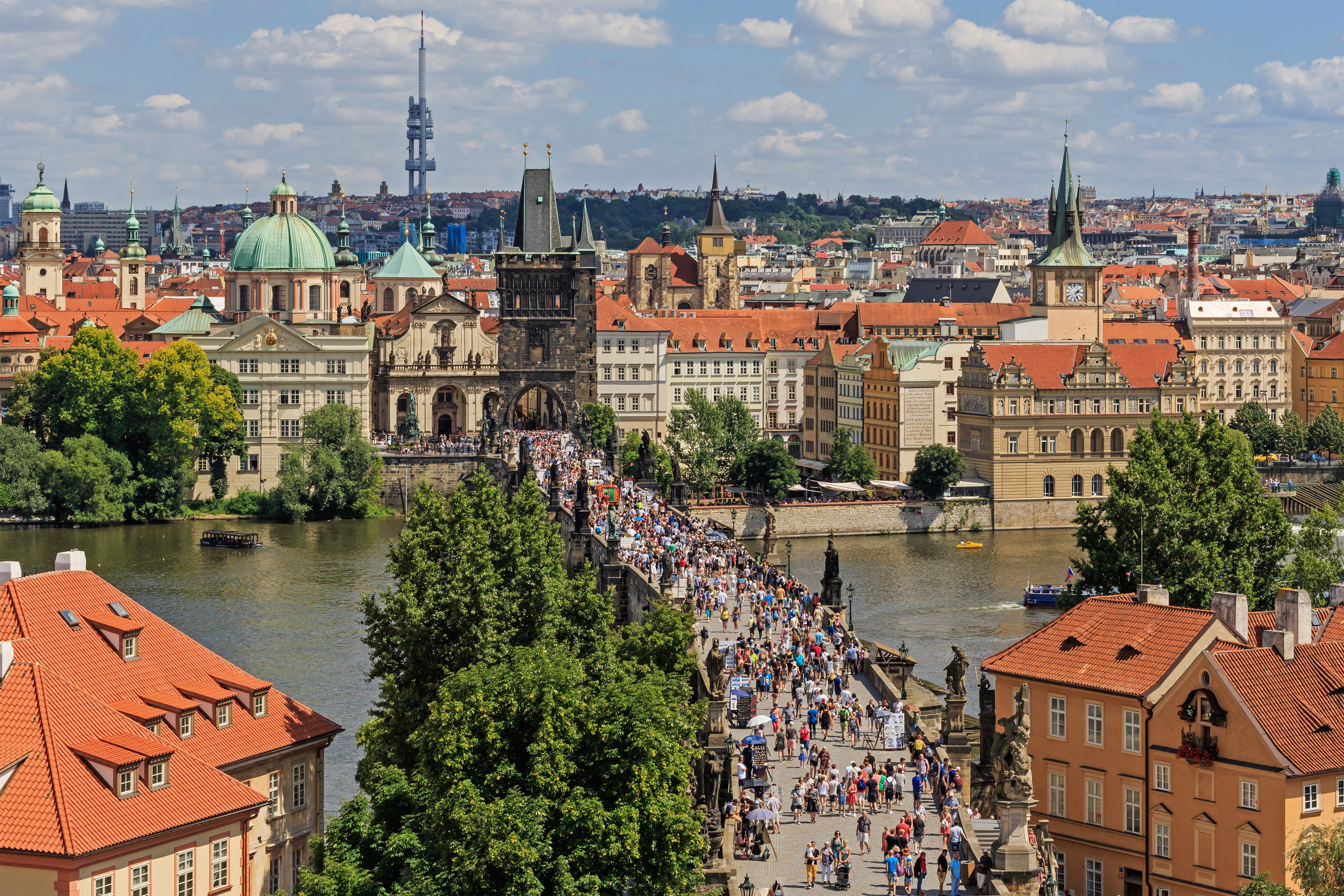
Prague, capital of the Czech Republic

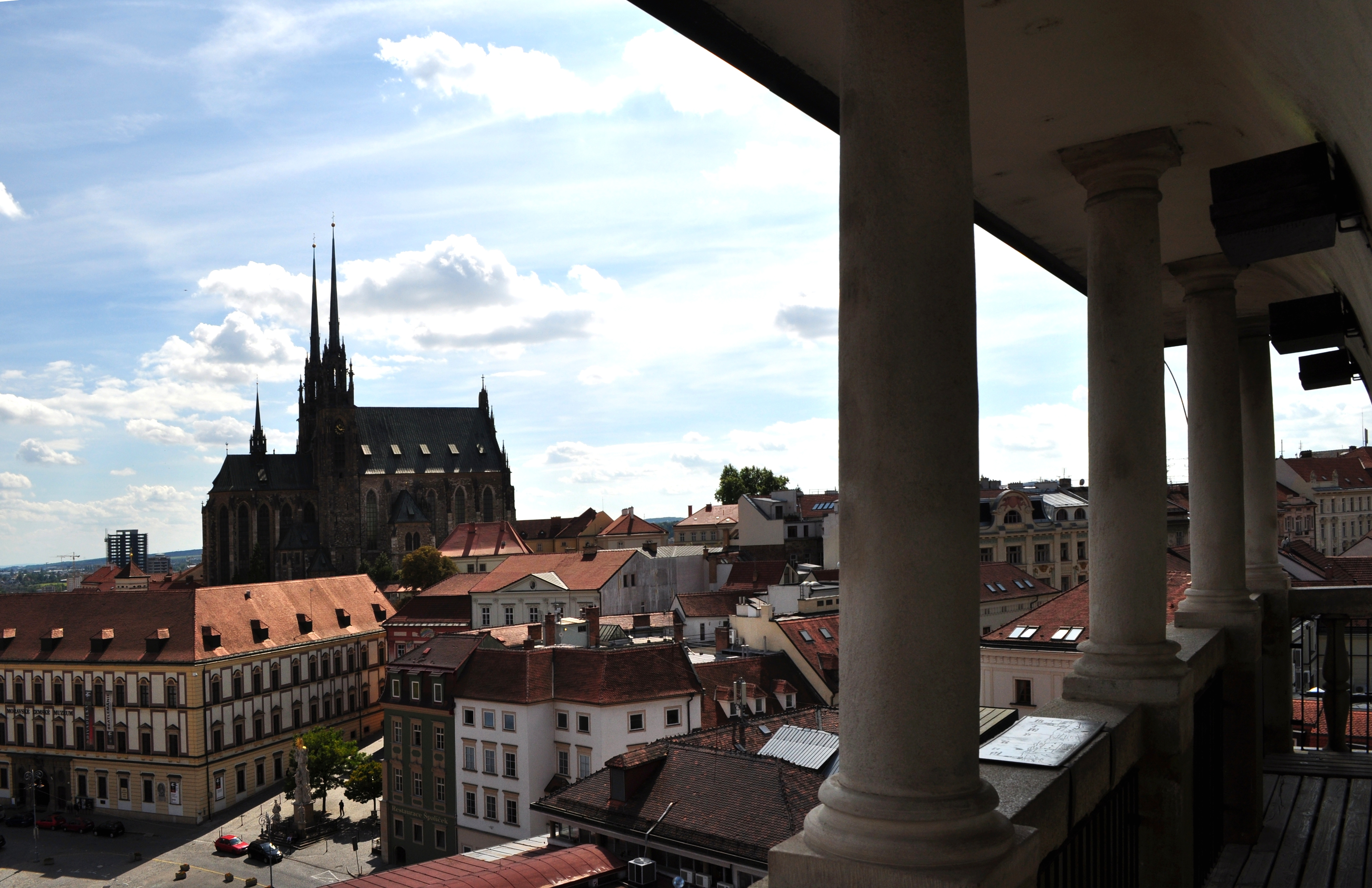
Brno

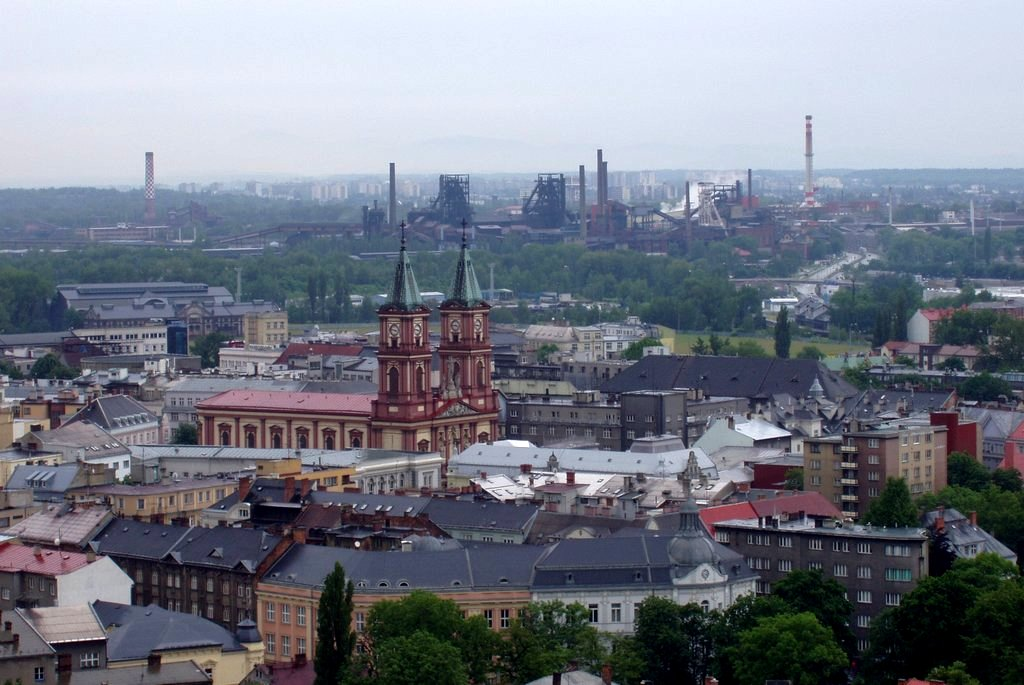
Ostrava

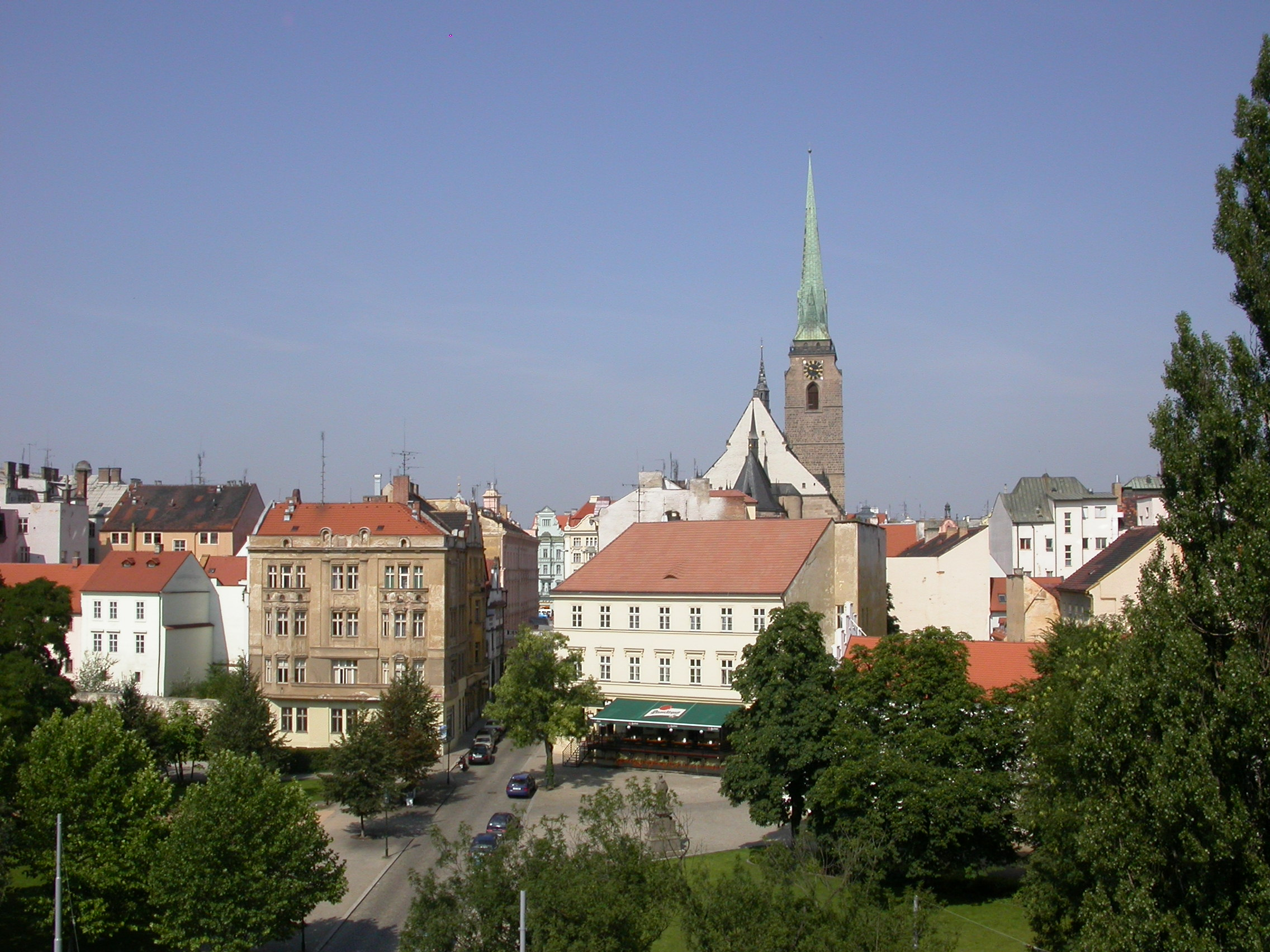
Plzeň

In the Czech Republic, a statutory city (Czech: statutární město) is a municipal corporation that has been granted city status by Act of Parliament. It is more prestigious than the simple title město ("town"), which can be awarded by the cabinet and chair of the Chamber of Deputies to a municipality which applies for it.

== Differences of statutory city ==
Statutory city status is partially ceremonial; the mayor is called primátor, rather than the starosta of other municipalities. Statutory cities are allowed to subdivide into self-governing city boroughs (sg. městský obvod) or city parts (sg. městská část) with their own elected councils; such a statutory city has to issue a statute (statut) that delimits power to boroughs. However, only seven statutory cities have done so. Cities Brno, Plzeň, Ústí nad Labem and Pardubice are divided into city boroughs, and Liberec has only one city borough with rest of the city being administered directly. Brno is divided into city parts, and Opava has eight city parts with rest of the city being administered directly. Also the capital of Prague, while not being de jure statutory city, is subdivided into similar self-governing boroughs.

== History ==
The model is derived from its common origin in Austria-Hungary. Until 1928, 11 cities in the Czech lands received the statutory city title: Prague, Liberec, Brno, Jihlava, Kroměříž, Olomouc, Uherské Hradiště, Znojmo, Opava, Frýdek, and Bielsko (which became a part of Poland in 1920). On 1 December 1928 their count was reduced to five (Prague, Liberec, Brno, Olomouc and Opava). In 1942 Plzeň became a statutory city.

Between 1949 and 1967, the institute of statutory cities was canceled by reform in self-government and the establishment of regions. Only Prague remained a de facto statutory city. After 1967, several cities received similar position as Prague (Brno, Plzeň, Ostrava and Ústí nad Labem), but the statutory city title was not used.

The concept was renewed after the fall of communism by the Act on Municipalities in 1990, which established 13 statutory cities in addition to Prague, the capital city which is still a de facto statutory city.

Unlike Austria, before districts of the Czech Republic were abolished only the three largest cities (Brno, Ostrava and Plzeň) constituted a district (okres) on their own; the others were a part (though always a capital, except Havířov) of a district with smaller municipalities. As the prestige associated with statutory city status grew, 12 additional statutory cities were created by the Act on Municipalities in 2000 and its four later amendments.

There are only two statutory cities, Havířov and Třinec, that are not seats of their eponymous districts.

== List ==
Since August 2018, there are 26 statutory cities (plus Prague), comprising all the Czech cities over 40 thousand inhabitants (and Třinec):

Name	Population	Area (km^{2})	Region	Statutory city since
Prague	1,407,084	496	Prague	
Brno	404,296	230	South Moravian	1990
Ostrava	280,853	214	Moravian-Silesian	1990
Plzeň	187,863	138	Plzeň	1990
Liberec	108,214	106	Liberec	1990
Olomouc	105,297	103	Olomouc	1990
České Budějovice	97,128	56	South Bohemian	1990
Hradec Králové	93,534	106	Hradec Králové	1990
Pardubice	92,713	78	Pardubice	1990
Ústí nad Labem	90,035	94	Ústí nad Labem	1990
Zlín	74,917	103	Zlín	1990
Kladno	69,728	37	Central Bohemian	2000
Havířov	67,998	32	Moravian-Silesian	1990
Most	63,160	87	Ústí nad Labem	2000
Opava	54,881	91	Moravian-Silesian	1990
Jihlava	53,686	88	Vysočina	2000
Frýdek-Místek	53,164	52	Moravian-Silesian	2006
Teplice	50,856	24	Ústí nad Labem	2003
Karlovy Vary	48,788	59	Karlovy Vary	1990
Karviná	48,937	57	Moravian-Silesian	2003
Mladá Boleslav	47,874	29	Central Bohemian	2003
Chomutov	46,560	29	Ústí nad Labem	2006
Jablonec nad Nisou	46,206	31	Liberec	2012
Děčín	46,003	118	Ústí nad Labem	2006
Prostějov	43,236	39	Olomouc	2012
Přerov	40,492	58	Olomouc	2006
Třinec	33,523	85	Moravian-Silesian	2018
