= Koffler =

Koffler is family name of:

- Andreas Wolfgang Koffler (1612–1651), Austrian Jesuit missionary at the court of Zhu Youlang
- Józef Koffler (1896–1944), Polish composer, musicologist and columnist
- Hanno Koffler (born 1980), German actor
- Leo Koffler (1879–1931), Austrian-German screenwriter, actor and singer
- Max Koffler (born 1978), German musician
- Murray Koffler (1924–2017), Canadian pharmacist and businessman
- Remus Koffler (1902–1954), Romanian communist activist and financier
