= Stolpersteine in Moravian-Silesian Region =

Memorial installation in Czech Republic

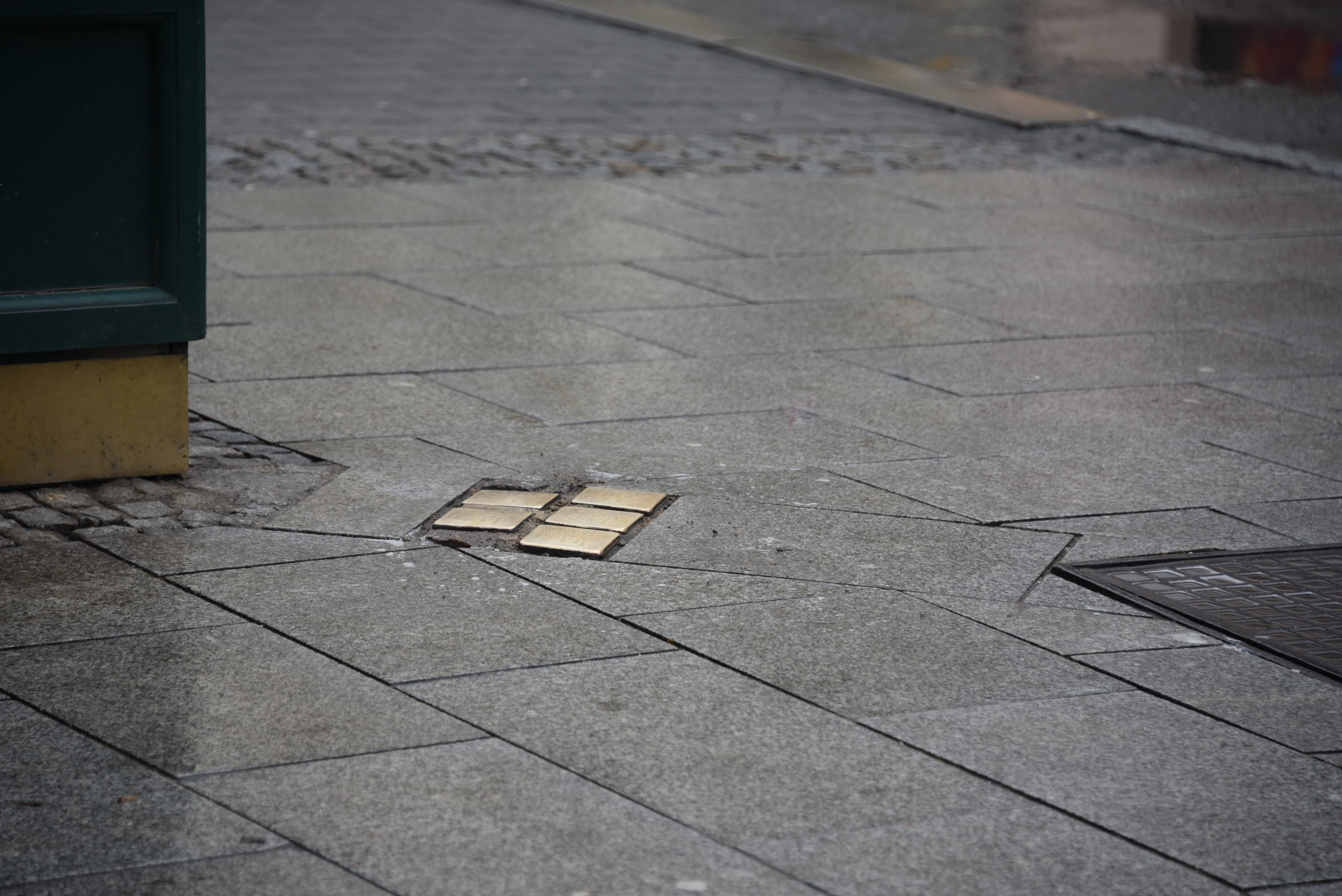
Stolpersteine in Ostrava for members of the Engel and Goldberger families

This article lists the Stolpersteine in the Moravian-Silesian Region (Czech: Moravskoslezský kraj, before 2001 "Ostrava Region") in the easternmost part of Moravia. Stolpersteine is the German name for stumbling blocks collocated all over Europe by German artist Gunter Demnig. They remember the fate of the Nazi victims being murdered, deported, exiled or driven to suicide.

Generally, the stumbling blocks are posed in front of the building where the victims had their last self chosen residence. The name of the Stolpersteine in Czech is: Kameny zmizelých, stones of the disappeared.

The lists are sortable; the basic order follows the alphabet according to the last name of the victim.

== Český Těšín ==
Stone	Inscription	Location	Life and death
	HERE LIVED; ROSALIE WIESNER; BORN 1858; DEPORTED 1942; TO AUSCHWITZ; MURDERED 15.6.1942; IBIDEM	Hlavní 2061; 49°44′58″N 18°37′35″E	Rosalie Wiesner née Šegerinová, also Rosalia, was born on 18 August 1858 in Tvrdošín, Slovakia. She was married to Adolf Wiesner. The couple had four children: Růžena (born 1883 in Gilowice, later married to Sigmund Lowy), Heinrich, Ida and Friedrich. Her husband died around 1901. She was the owner of the famous Café Avion in Český Těšín. The café was destroyed by retreating Polish forces in September 1939. After the German occupation of the town she moved to Žilina to live with her daughter Ida, who was married to Árpád Braun, a doctor of law. The couple had a baby son, named Heinrich. In April 1942 all four family members were arrested and deported to Auschwitz concentration camp. On 15 June 1942, at the age of nearly 84, Rosalie Wiesner was murdered by the Nazi regime. Also her daughter Ida, her son-in-law and her little grandson were murdered at Auschwitz. Her daughter Růžena and her granddaughter Signe Sevec née Löwy could survive the Shoah. Růžena Löwy became a widow and later married JUDr. Joseph Michalek. In 2010, the café was rebuilt in its original form.

== Krnov ==
Stone	Inscription	Location	Life and death
	HERE LIVED; LEO AUERBACH; BORN 1927; DEPORTED 1942; TO THERESIENSTADT; MURDERED 8.10.1942; IN TREBLINKA	Jeremenkova 17	Leo Auerbach was born on 26 April 1927. His parents were Josef Auerbach (born 1887 in Odessa) and Regina née Stambergerová (see below). He had two brothers, Erich (born 1914) and Bedřich (born 1920). He was a schoolboy, his last residence with his family before deportation was in Moravská Ostrava. On 26 September 1942, he and his mother were deported by transport Bl to Theresienstadt concentration camp. His transport number was 668 of 862. After two weeks, on 8 October 1942, mother and son were deported by transport Bu to Treblinka extermination camp. His transport number was 929 of 1,000. There both were murdered by the Nazi regime, most likely on the day of their arrival. Leo Auerbach was 15 then. Both his Auerbach uncles David and Arnošt, their wives, David's two children, his aunt Anna Weiss and her husband were extinct in concentration camps. Also his grand mother from the mother's side, Emilia Stamberger, and several other family members were killed by the Nazi regime. Leo Auerbach's father and his brothers could survive. Josef Auerbach died in 1958 in Moravská Ostrava. Eric Auber, how he called himself in England, died in 2002 in Romford, Essex. Bedřich died in 1988 in the United States.
	HERE LIVED; REGINA; AUERBACHOVÁ; NÉE STAMBERGEROVÁ; BORN 1892; DEPORTED 1942; TO THERESIENSTADT; MURDERED 8.10.1942; IN TREBLINKA	Jeremenkova 17	Regina Auerbachová née Stambergerová was born on 2 March 1892 in Kęty, today Poland. Her parents were Emilia and Zee Stamberger. She had at least three siblings, Anna (bornShe was married to Josef Auerbach (born on 17 December 1887 in Odessa, today Ukraine). The couple had three sons, Erich (born in 1914), Bedřich (born 1920) and Leo (see above). Her last residence with his family before deportation was in Moravská Ostrava. On 26 September 1942, she and her youngest son were deported by transport Bl to Theresienstadt concentration camp. Her transport number was 667 of 862. After two weeks, on 8 October 1942, mother and son were deported by transport Bu to Treblinka extermination camp. Her transport number was 928 of 1,000. There both were murdered by the Nazi regime, most likely on the day of their arrival. Also her mother, two sisters-in-law, Meta and Irma, and several other family members were killed in the course of the Shoah. Her husband and their two older sons could survive. Josef Auerbach died in 1958 in Moravská Ostrava. Eric Auber, how he called himself in England, died in 2002 in Romford, Essex. Bedřich died in 1988 in the United States.
	HERE LIVED; ING. JOSEF BAAR; BORN 1877; DEPORTED 1941; TO ŁÓDŹ; MURDERED 1942	Mikulášská 62	Ing. Josef Baar was born on 12 October 1877 in Příbor (German: Freiberg in Mähren). The names of his parents most probably were Iszak or Isaak and Rosalia or Sarah. He became an engineer for construction and worked as a Kontrolor for the railway company. He was married to Margaret (born 1890). The couple had two sons, Robert and Friedrich. In 1939, the couple moved to Prague. Their last residence before deportation was Prague VIII, Na Zápalčí 8. Also in 1939, their sons could emigrate to England, where Frederick Baar joined the Royal Army Medical Corps and served in India and the Middle East. Later-on Frederick Baar became a surgeon. On 26 October 1941, Josef Baar was deported by transport C to the Łódź Ghetto. His transport number was 399 of 1,000. There he was murdered on 7 March 1942. The official cause of death was Pleuropneumonia. His wife was murdered in Auschwitz concentration camp. A report of his death was submitted to Yad Vashem by his youngest son, Dr. Frederick Baar, in 1992. He then lived in Canada, was married and had two children.
	HERE LIVED; MARGARET BAAR; BORN 1890; DEPORTED 1941; TO ŁÓDŹ; MURDERED	Mikulášská 62	Margaret Baar née Schafranek was born on 20 January 1890 in Bruntál. Her parents were Emma and Josef Schafranek. She married Josef Baar and became a housewife. The couple had two sons, Robert and Friedrich. In 1939, the couple moved to Prague. Their last residence before deportation was Prague VIII, Na Zápalčí 8. Also in 1939, their sons could emigrate to England, where the younger son, Frederick Baar, joined the Royal Army Medical Corps and served in India and the Middle East. Later-on Frederick Baar became a surgeon. The whereabouts of Margaret Baar between 1939 and 1944 are not known. The stolperstein states that she too, like her husband, was deported by transport C to the Łódź Ghetto on 26 October 1941. But her name does not appear in the transport lists. Her husband was murdered by the Nazi regime on 7 March 1942 in Łódź. Margaret Baar was deported to Auschwitz concentration camp where she too was murdered, most probably in 1944 or 1945. A report of her death was submitted to Yad Vashem by her youngest son, Dr. Frederick Baar, in 1992. Frederick Baar then lived in Canada, was married and had two children. He died in 1999.
	HERE LIVED; HUGO BRAUN; BORN 1875; DEPORTED 1942; TO THERESIENSTADT; TO WARSAW 1942; MURDERED	Náměstí Minoritů 88/11	Hugo Braun was born on 12 March 1875 in Uherský Ostroh. His parents were Izsac Braun (born 1930) and Fany née Winter (born 1835 in Brod, Bosnia and Herzegovina). He had two sisters and two brothers. In 1904, he married Sidonie née Kleinová and the couple moved to Sarajevo, where he became an official at the Post Office. On 17 April 1909 their son Walter was born, in 1911 Hugo Braun was transferred to Krnov. So the family moved back to Moravia. In WW1 he served in the Austrian-Hungarian Army. Altogether he worked for 30 years in post offices. Later-on he became postal director of Krnov. After retirement, the couple moved to Brno, their last residence before deportation. On 28 January 1942 Hugo and Sidonie Braun were deported by transport U to Theresienstadt concentration camp. His transport number was 654 of 1,001. After three months, on 25 April 1942, they were deported with transport An to Warsaw Ghetto. His transport number was 422 of 1,000. There, both husband and wife lost their lives. Their son Walter could survive the Shoah. He went to Palestine, called himself Avner Bar On and founded a family. He reported the death of his parents and of further eight family members to Yad Vashem.
	HERE LIVED; SIDONIE BRAUN; BORN 1880; DEPORTED 1942; TO THERESIENSTADT; TO WARSAW 1942; MURDERED	Náměstí Minoritů 88/11	Sidonie Braun née Kleinová was born on 18 December 1880 in Uherský Ostroh. Her parents were Fanni and Sigmund Klein. In 1904, she was married to Hugo Braun, a postal officer. When her husband was transferred to Sarajevo shortly after their marriage, she moved with him. There the only son of the couple, Walter, was born in 1909. Two years later the family moved to Krnov. The last residence of Hugo and Sidonie Braun before deportation was in Brno. On 28 January 1942 they were deported by transport U to Theresienstadt concentration camp. Her transport number was 655 of 1,001. After three months, on 25 April 1942, they were deported with transport An to Warsaw Ghetto. Her transport number was 423 of 1,000. There, both husband and wife lost their lives. Their son should survive. He married Ella and they had two children.
	HERE LIVED; FANNY JOKL; BORN 1870; DEPORTED 1942; MURDERED; IN AUSCHWITZ-BIRKENAU	Hlavní náměstí 96/1 (vis-á-vis a Kavárna)	Fanny Jokl was born on 27 March 1870. She was married to Moritz Jokl. The couple had two daughters, Frieda and Annie (born 1905), and four sons, Paul (born 1895), Fritz, Wilhelm (born 1899) and Erich (born 1909). The family owned a house in the center of the city, opposite the City Café. After the signing of the Munich Agreement which enabled the German Reich to invade and occupy Krnov, the family decided to flee to Liptovský Mikuláš. Along the way, her husband had a heart attack and died. He was 69 years old. He was buried in the Jewish cemetery of Liptovský. Thereafter the family was scattered to the four winds. Her son Fritz, his wife and his two little children succeeded in emigrating to Palestine in March 1939 with legal British permits. Her daughter Frieda and her husband flew to Hungary, their daughter left for London, their son for Palestine. Fanny and Moritz Jokl's oldest son Paul flew to Paris. Fanny Jokl herself was caught in Slovakia and deported from Žilina to Auschwitz concentration camp with the transport of 22 September 1942. Her transport number was 520. She was murdered by the Nazi regime at the age of 72. Her son Paul was caught by the Nazis in France, deported and murdered. Her daughter Frieda and her husband Wilhelm Rosenfeld were caught by the Nazis in Hungary, were deported to a concentration camp, but could survive. Her daughter Anna and her sons Wilhelm and Erich were also caught, deported and murdered, but it is unknown where and when.
	HERE LIVED; MORITZ JOKL; BORN 1865; KILLED 1942; ON THE RUN; IN LIPTOVSKÝ MIKULÁŠ	Hlavní náměstí 96/1 (vis-á-vis a Kavárna)	Moritz Jokl was born in 1865. He had at least two brothers, Josef and Sigmund. He was married to Fanny. The couple had two daughters, Frieda and Annie, and four sons, Paul, Fritz, Wilhelm and Erich. The family owned a house in the center of the city, opposite the City Café, which later-on was destroyed and now is a grassy field. After the signing of the Munich Agreement which enabled the German Reich to occupy the so-called Sudetenland and therefore also Krnov, the family decided to flee to Liptovský Mikuláš. Along the way, Moritz Jokl had a heart attack and died. He was 69 years old. Two of his children and four of his grandchildren could survive the Shoah: Frieda married Wilhelm Rosenfeld. The couple had two children, Lizi and Ernest. The couple could flee to Sopron and later to Budapest. Lizi went to study in London and stayed there during the Nazi reign in Moravia, Ernest emigrated to Palestine in 1942. Frieda and Wilhelm Rosenfeld were caught in Hungary, deported to a concentration camp, but could survive. After the end of Nazi regime they emigrated to Palestine.; Fritz married Jenny Meister from Vienna, they had two children, Miryam (later married as Salter) and Gideon Tomáš (born on 7 March 1937). They stayed in Liptovsky Mikulas until March 1939 and then left for Constantinople aboard the ship "Har Zion" and arrived in Palestine. They arrived legally with British permits.; Four children of Fanny and Moritz Jokl were murdered by the Nazi regime: Paul escaped to Paris and lived there until 1943. Attempts of the family to get him to London failed. The Germans arrested him and deported him to a concentration camp. He was killed by the Nazi regime at an unknown place and at an unknown day. Annie, Wilhelm and Erich had left Krnov already in August 1938 toward to the Czech inland. Erich worked as a dentist in Opava. They all also lost their lives during the Shoah.
	HERE LIVED; ERNA LANGSCHUR; BORN 1890; DEPORTED 1942; TO THERESIENSTADT; MURDERED 1942; IN BARANAVICHY	Hlavní náměstí 96/1 (vis-á-vis a Kavárna)	Erna Langschur née Kohn, also Arnoštka Langschurová, was born on 3 February 1890 in Krnov. Her parents were Karl Kohn and Sophie née Adler. She married Dr. Sigmund Langschur, a teacher for French and English. The couple had at least one son, Herbert. She was a housewife. Her last residence before deportation was in Olomouc. On 8 July 1942 she and her husband were deported to Theresienstadt concentration camp by transport AAo. Her transport number was 199 of 748. Within twenty days, on 28 July 1942, the couple were deported to Baranovichi by transport AAy. Her transport number was 499 of 1,001. Erna Langschur and her husband were murdered there. Their son could escape and survive.
	HERE LIVED; DR. SIGMUND; LANGSCHUR; BORN 1884; DEPORTED 1942; TO THERESIENSTADT; MURDERED 1942; IN BARANAVICHY	Hlavní náměstí 96/1 (vis-á-vis a Kavárna)	Dr. Sigmund Langschur, also Siegmund, Zigmund and Zikmund, was born on 8 June 1884 in Poběžovice. His parents were Abraham Langschur (1841-1923) and Pauline née Grüner (1849-1928). He had twelve siblings. He was a teacher for French and English and was married to Erna née Kohn. The couple had at least one son, Herbert. His last residence before deportation was in Olomouc. On 8 July 1942 he and his wife were deported to Theresienstadt concentration camp by transport AAo. His transport number was 198 of 748. Within twenty days, on 28 July 1942, the couple were deported to Baranovichi by transport AAy. His transport number was 498 of 1,001. Dr. Sigmund Langschur and his wife were murdered there. Their son could escape and survive. Four of his siblings were also murdered in the course of the Shoah, Sophie in Treblinka and Theresie in Theresienstadt, both in 1942, Emilie in an unknown location and Juli in Warsaw, both in 1943. Only his sister Betty could survive, she died in 1978 in Gloucester, Massachusetts.
	HERE LIVED; MATHILDE LÖWIN; BORN 1895; DEPORTED 1942; TO THERESIENSTADT; MURDERED 1942; IN MALY TROSTINEC	Soukenická 140/21	Mathilde Löwin née Fichmann was born on 15 November 1895 in Vienna. Her mother was Sarah Ettel Fichmann (1856-1931). She had four sisters, Rosa (later married to Philipp Katz, four children), Gina (also Regine, later married to Gustav Haas), Gusti (also Auguste, married to Ignatz Hönig) and Ella (married to Elie Weinreb). She was married to Walter Löwin. Her last residence before deportation was in Prague II, Mezibranská 5. On 27 July 1942 she and her husband were deported to Theresienstadt concentration camp by transport AAu. Her transport number was 269 of 1,002. Within eight days, on 4 August 1942, the couple were deported to Maly Trostenets extermination camp by transport AAz. Her transport number was 490 of 1,000. Mathilde Löwin and her husband were murdered there. Her four sisters all survived the War: Ella (England), Gina (England and Czechoslovakia, Gusti aka Herta (Chile), and Rosa.
	HERE LIVED; WALTER LÖWIN; BORN 1886; DEPORTED 1942; TO THERESIENSTADT; MURDERED 1942; IN MALY TROSTINEC	Soukenická 140/21	Walter Löwin, also Valtr, was born on 29 October 1886 in Krnov. He was married to Mathilde née Fichmann. His last residence before deportation was in Prague II, Mezibranská 5. On 27 July 1942 he and his wife were deported to Theresienstadt concentration camp by transport AAu. His transport number was 270 of 1,002. Within eight days, on 4 August 1942, the couple were deported to Maly Trostenets extermination camp by transport AAz. His transport number was 491 of 1,000. Walter Löwin and his wife were murdered there.
	HERE LIVED; DR. DAVID; RUDOLFER; BORN 1871; DEPORTED 1942; TO THERESIENSTADT; MURDERED 1942	Soukenická 83/28	Dr. David Rudolfer was born on 16 June 1871 in Oradea, Romenia or in Trebišov, Slovakia. His parents were Moshe Rudolfer (1845-1926) and Eva née Waldman. He had two siblings, Yochanan (born 1869) and Jozefina (born 1873). He became a teacher and a Rabbi and he married Sidonia née Pollak, also Sabina (1880-?). The couple had two children, Morechai Max (born on 9 August 1905) and Hana Anna. From 1902 to 1904 he was Rabbi in Horn, Austria. His last address before deportation was in Brno. On 23 March 1942 he was deported to Theresienstadt by transport Ad. His transport number was 684 of 1,001. There he lost his life on 14 September 1942. The fate of his siblings, of his wife and his children is unknown. His grandson Tomáš was murdered by the Nazi regime in 1944 at Auschwitz.
	HERE LIVED; TOMÁŠ RUDOLFER; BORN 1935; DEPORTED 1942; TO THERESIENSTADT; MURDERED 1944; IN AUSCHWITZ-BIRKENAU	Soukenická 83/28	Tomas Rudolfer was born on 30 November 1935. His parents were Mordechai Max Rudolfer (1905-?) and Yaffa Drora Rudolfer (1916-1995). His parents divorced. The fate of his father is unknown. His grandfather Dr. David Rudolfer lost his life in Theresienstadt concentration camp in September 1942. The boy's last address before deportation was in Brno. On 6 March 1943 the 7 year old was deported to Theresienstadt by transport Cv. His transport number was 919 of 1,022. He stayed there for nearly 19 months. On 23 October 1944 he was deported to Auschwitz concentration camp by transport Et. His transport number was 922 of 1,714. There he was killed by the Nazi regime.
	HERE LIVED; ANNA SINGER; BORN 1886; DEPORTED 1942; TO THERESIENSTADT; MURDERED 1942; IN MALY TROSTINEC	Soukenická 83/28	Anna Singer née Kohn, also Anni, was born on 18 June 1886 in Údlice. Her parents were Edmund Kohn (1844-1915) and Rosa née Goldmann (1849-1911). She had seven older siblings. She was married to Dr. Berthold Singer. The couple had at least four daughters, Helene (born 1914), Marianne (around 1915), Liesel (later named Kohner) and Rosel. Anni Singer and her daughter were deported first to Theresienstadt concentration camp. There mother and daughter were separated. Anna Singer was deported to Auschwitz concentration camp, Helene to Maly Trostenets extermination camp. Both were murdered by the Nazi regime. On 27 July 1942 her husband was deported from Prague to Theresienstadt. On 23 January 1943 he was deported to Auschwitz and killed immediately after arrival. The fate of their daughters Liesel and Rosel is unknown. Their daughter Marianne could escape, she died 1990 in New York. Four of the five siblings who were still alive at the beginning of the Nazi occupation were murdered: Ida in Jasenovac concentration camp and Bruno in Trawniki, both in 1942, Karl Jakob in Auschwitz and Julius in Theresienstadt, both in 1943. Only her sister Klara could escape to the USA.
	HERE LIVED; HELENE SINGER; BORN 1914; DEPORTED 1942; TO THERESIENSTADT; MURDERED 1942; IN MALY TROSTINEC	Soukenická 83/28	Helene Singer, also Helena, was born on 27 November 1914 in Krnov. Her parents were Dr. Berthold Singer and Anna née Kohn. She had at least three sisters, Marianne, Liesel and Rosel. Her last place of registration before deportation was in Prague XII, Gebauerova 16. On 20 June 1942 she was deported to Theresienstadt concentration camp by transport AAe. Her transport number was 1000 of 1,005. Within one month, on 14 July 1942, she was deported to Maly Trostenets extermination camp by transport AAx. Her transport number was 300 of 1,000. She was murdered there. Both her parents were murdered by the Nazi regime in Auschwitz. The fate of her sisters Liesel and Rosel is unknown. Marianne could escape, she died 1990 in New York.

== Ostrava ==
Stone	Inscription	Location	Life and death
	HERE LIVED; BERTA; APFELBAUMOVÁ; NÉE ZOLLMANNOVÁ; BORN 1893; DEPORTED 1942; TO THERESIENSTADT; MURDERED 5.10.1942; IN TREBLINKA	Pobialova 875/8	Berta Apfelbaumová née Zollmannová was born on 16 July 1893 in Poland. Her parents were Berta and David Meir Zollmann. She was married to Yaakov/Jakob Apfelbaum. The couple had at least two children, Edita (born 1924) and David Meir. On 26 September 1942, she was deported to Theresienstadt concentration camp by transport Bl. Her transport number was 849. Later she and her daughter were deported to Treblinka extermination camp by transport Bt (with transport number 650). Presumably Berta Apfelbaumová and her daughter already died in the cattle truck before arriving in Treblinka. Her son could emigrate to England and survive the Shoah.
	HERE LIVED; EDITA; APFELBAUMOVÁ; BORN 1924; DEPORTED 1942; TO THERESIENSTADT; MURDERED 5.10.1942; IN TREBLINKA	Pobialova 875/8	Edita Apfelbaumová, also Edita Feigl Pesa Apfelbaumová was born on 7 March 1924 in Ostrava. Her parents were Jakob Apfelbaum and Berta née Zollmannová. She had at least one brother, David Meir. On 26 September 1942, she and her mother were deported to Theresienstadt concentration camp by transport Bl. Later-on mother and daughter were deported to Treblinka extermination camp by transport Bt. Presumably Edita Apfelbaumová and her mother already died in the cattle truck before arriving in Treblinka. Her brother could emigrate to England and survive the Shoah.
	HERE LIVED; ROBERT ENGEL; BORN 1906; DEPORTED 1942; TO THERESIENSTADT; 1944 TO AUSCHWITZ; MURDERED 18.4.1945; IN DACHAU	Poděbradova 27	Robert Engel was born on 24 August 1906 in Michalkovice. His parents were Samuel Engel (1872-1918) and Ana née Rosentzveig (born 1874). He had five sisters, Stella (born 1901), Berta (born 1902), Valerie (born 1904) and the twins Charlotta and Ruth (born 1913). He was a butcher and married to Helga née Goldbergerová. The couple had a little son, Tomáš, born on 2 June 1938 in Ostrava. He, his wife and his son lived together with his parents-in-law in Poděbradova 27 in Ostrava. After the Nazi invasion step by step all his family members were extinct. First his sister Ruth died on 30 April 1942 in Gmina Zamość, Poland, at age 28. The fate of her twin sister Charlotta is unknown. On 26 September 1942, Robert Engel, his wife and his son as well as his parents-in-law were all arrested and deported to Theresienstadt concentration camp by transport Bl. His transport number was 754 of 862. There the family members were separated after ten days, the parents of his wife were deported on 5 October 1942 to Treblinka extermination camp where they were both murdered. Three days later his sister Berta was murdered in Auschwitz concentration camp. On 22 October 1942 his mother lost her life in Treblinka. Thereafter he, his wife and the little son remained interred in Theresienstadt for two years. On 1 October 1944, Robert Engel was separated from wife and child and got deported alone to Auschwitz by transport Em (transport number 936 of 1,501), where he was a forced laborer. Five days later, on 6 October 1944, his wife, his son and his sister Stella were gassed at Auschwitz-Birkenau. On 28 October 1944 also his fifth sister, Valerie, was murdered in Auschwitz. At last, also he lost his life on 18 April 1945 in Dachau.
	HERE LIVED; TOMÁŠ ENGEL; BORN 1938; DEPORTED 1942; TO THERESIENSTADT; MURDERED 6.10.1944; IN AUSCHWITZ	Poděbradova 27	Tomáš Engel was born on 2 June 1938 in Ostrava. His parents were Robert Engel and Helga née Goldbergerová. He grew up in an apartment with his parents and his maternal grandparents, Ferdinand Goldberger and Helena Goldbergerová. On 26 September 1942, all five family members were arrested and deported to Theresienstadt concentration camp by transport Bl. His transport number was 756 of 862. There the family was separated after ten days. While the little boy and his parents remained in Theresienstadt, his grandparents were deported on 5 October 1942 to Treblinka extermination camp where they were both murdered. Tomáš Engel spent two years in the concentration camp, then his father was separated from mother and child and deported to Auschwitz concentration camp to perform forced labor. Five days later, on 6 October 1944, the 6 years old boy and his mother were also deported to Auschwitz. His transport number was 906 of 1,550. They were immediately after arrival murdered in one of the gas chambers. His father lost his life on 18 April 1945 in Dachau, eleven days before the liberation of the camp.
	HERE LIVED; HERTA ENGELOVÁ; NÉE GOLDBERGEROVÁ; BORN 1915; DEPORTED 1942; TO THERESIENSTADT; MURDERED 6.10.1944; IN AUSCHWITZ	Poděbradova 27	Herta Engelová née Goldbergerová was born on 17 April 1915 in Ostrava. Her parents were Ferdinand Goldberger and Helena née Tramerová. She had three older siblings, but her sister Henrietta (born 1905) had already died in 1908. Her brother Henry, also Heinrich or Heino, was born in 1907, her sister Else in 1908. She was a housewife and married to Robert Engel. The couple had a little son, Tomáš, born on 2 June 1938. The young couple and their son lived with Herta's parents in one apartment. On 26 September 1942, all five of them were deported from Ostrava to Theresienstadt concentration camp by transport Bl. Her transport number was 755 of 862. There the family was separated after ten days. While the younger couple and their son remained in Theresienstadt, her parents were deported on 5 October 1942 to Treblinka extermination camp. They were murdered there. After two years in Theresienstadt her husband was deported to Auschwitz concentration camp to perform forced labor. Herta Engelová and her 6 years old son were also deported to Auschwitz five days later by transport Eo. Her transport number was 905 of 1,550. Mother and son were gassed immediately after arrival. Her husband lost his life in Dachau on 18 April 1945.
	HERE LIVED; FERDINAND; GOLDBERGER; BORN 1878; DEPORTED 1942; TO THERESIENSTADT; MURDERED 5.10.1942; IN TREBLINKA	Poděbradova 27	Ferdinand Goldberger was born on 22 February 1878. His parents were Heinrich Goldberger (ca. 1852-1897) and Henriette née Ritter, also Berta (1854-1908). He had seven siblings. Ferdinand Goldberger was married to Helena née Tramerová. The couple had four children, Henrietta (1905-1908), Henry, also Heinrich or Heino (born 1907), Else (born 1908) and Herta (born 1915), who later was married to Robert Engel. The couple had a little son, Tomáš, born on 2 June 1938. On 26 September 1942, Ferdinand Goldberger and his wife, their daughter Herta, her husband and her son were all deported to Theresienstadt concentration camp by transport Bl. His transport number was 757 of 862. There the family was separated after ten days. While the younger couple and their son remained in Theresienstadt, Ferdinand Goldberger and Helena Goldbergerová were deported on 5 October 1942 to Treblinka extermination camp. His transport number was 616 of 1,000. They were both murdered by the Nazi regime as were all other Jews on this transport. On 1 October 1944 their son-in-law Robert Engel was deported to Auschwitz concentration camp by transport Em. On 6 October 1944, their daughter Herta Engelová and 6-year-old grandson Tomáš were deported to Auschwitz and murdered in a gas chamber immediately after arrival. Also Ferdinand Goldberger's youngest siblings, Ludwig and Augusta, became victims of the Shoah. Robert Engel he lost his life on 18 April 1945 in Dachau concentration camp. Son Henry and daughter Else could survive. They both married and had one child each. Else died in 1986 in New York, Henry in 1993 in Fort Lauderdale.
	HERE LIVED; HELENA; GOLDBERGEROVÁ; NÉE TRAMEROVÁ; BORN 1884; DEPORTED 1942; TO THERESIENSTADT; MURDERED 5.10.1942; IN TREBLINKA	Poděbradova 27	Helena Goldbergerová née Tramerová, also Helene, was born on 7 April 1884 in Ostrava. Her parents were Natan Tramer (1841-1888) and Rosa née Salomonowitz (ca. 1843-1890). She had six sisters, Laura, Rosa, Ernestina, Fany, Regina and Pepi, and five brothers, Ferdinand Wolf, Adolf, Alois, Heinrich and Salomon. She was married to Ferdinand Goldberger. The couple had four children: Henrietta (1905-1908); Henry (born on 20 May 1907); Else (born on 26 December 1908) and; Herta (born 11 July 1915), who later was married to Robert Engel. The couple had a little son, Tomáš, born on 2 June 1938.; On 26 September 1942, Helena Goldbergerová and her husband, their daughter Herta, her husband and her son were all deported to Theresienstadt concentration camp by transport Bl. Her transport number was 758 of 862. There the family was separated after ten days. While the younger couple and their son remained in Theresienstadt, Ferdinand Goldberger and Helena Goldbergerová were deported on 5 October 1942 to Treblinka extermination camp. Her transport number was 617 of 1,000. They were both murdered by the Nazi regime as were all other Jews on this transport. On 1 October 1944 son-in-law Robert Engel was deported to Auschwitz concentration camp by transport Em. On 6 October 1944, their daughter Herta Engelová and 6-year-old grandson Tomáš were deported to Auschwitz and murdered immediately after arrival in a gas chamber. Robert Engel was thereafter transferred to Dachau concentration camp, where he was killed on 18 April 1945. At least two of Helena Goldbergerová's siblings, Adolf Tramer and Fany Weinstock, were also murdered in Treblinka in the course of the Shoah. Son Henry and daughter Else could survive. Henry called himself Gordy, married Hilda née Glück. The couple had one child. Else married Fred Brichta. The couple had a son, named Paul. Else died in January 1986 in New York, Henry on 3 May 1993 in Fort Lauderdale.
	HERE LIVED; PAVEL KOHN; BORN 1893; DEPORTED 1941; TO ŁÓDŹ; MURDERED; IN BELZEC	Jeremenkova 806/21	Dr. Pavel Kohn was born on 15 June 1893. His parents were Moritz and Julie Kohn. He was an advocate and married to Jindřiška née Brunnerová. The couple had at least one son, Richard. Their last residence before deportation was in Prague XII, Soběslavská 1. On 21 October 1941, he and his wife were deported from Prague to the Łódź Ghetto by transport B. His transport number was 717 of 1,003. He and his wife were murdered by the Nazi regime. The report to Yad Vashem was submitted by their son, Richard Kingsley, as he was named in 1991. He lived in England then.
	HERE LIVED; JINDŘIŠKA KOHNOVÁ; NÉE BRUNNEROVÁ; BORN 1907; DEPORTED 1941; TO ŁÓDŹ; MURDERED; IN BELZEC	Jeremenkova 806/21	Jindřiška Kohnová née Brunnerovás Brunnerová born on 30 July 1907 in Opava. Her parents were Gustav Brunner and Štĕpánka Brunnerová. She was married to Dr. Pavel Kohn. The couple had at least one son, Richard. Their last residence before deportation was in Prague XII, Soběslavská 1. On 21 October 1941, she and her husband were deported from Prague to the Łódź Ghetto by transport B. Both were murdered by the Nazi regime. The report to Yad Vashem was submitted by their son, Richard Kingsley, as he was named in 1991. He lived in England then.
	HERE LIVED; EDUARD (ISRAEL); LIESER; BORN 1936; DEPORTED 1942; TO THERESIENSTADT; MURDERED 18.12.1943; IN AUSCHWITZ	Musorgského 10	Eduard Lieser, also Yisrael, Israel or Izrael, was born on 17 January 1936. His parents were Shimon Lieser and Cyra née Forscherová. He had at least two brothers, Jiří (born 1933) and Elimelekh, who could survive the Shoah. On 22 September 1942, he, his mother and his brother Jiří were deported to Theresienstadt concentration camp by transport Bi. His transport Number was 586 of 862. The three family members remained interred there for fifteen months. On 18 December 1943, the mother and her sons were deported to Auschwitz concentration camp by transport Ds. His transport Number was 2271 of 2,503. Eduard Lieser and his brother, age 7 and 107, as well as their mother were all murdered there by the Nazi regime, most probably in a gas chamber. Also his grandparents for the paternal side, Yosef Lieser and Atara née Krik, lost their lives in Auschwitz.
	HERE LIVED; JIŘÍ (YECHIEL); LIESER; BORN 1933; DEPORTED 1942; TO THERESIENSTADT; MURDERED 18.12.1943; IN AUSCHWITZ	Musorgského 10	Jiří Lieser, also Jechiel or Yekhiel, was born on 17 September 1933. His parents were Shimon Lieser and Cyra née Forscherová. He had at least two brothers, Eduard (born 1936) and Elimelekh, who could survive the Shoah. On 22 September 1942, he, his mother and his brother Eduard were deported to Theresienstadt concentration camp by transport Bi. His transport Number was 585 of 862. The three family members remained interred there for fifteen months. On 18 December 1943, the mother and her sons were deported to Auschwitz concentration camp by transport Ds. His transport Number was 2270 of 2,503. Jiří Lieser and his brother, age 10 and 7, and their mother were all murdered there by the Nazi regime, most probably in a gas chamber. Also his grandparents for the paternal side, Yosef Lieser and Atara née Krik, lost their lives in Auschwitz.
	HERE LIVED; CYRA (CILA); LIESEROVÁ; NÉE FORSCHEROVÁ; BORN 1900; DEPORTED 1942; TO THERESIENSTADT; MURDERED 18.12.1943; IN AUSCHWITZ	Musorgského 10	Cyra Lieserová née Forscherová was born 21 August 1900 in Moravska Ostrava. She had two first names, Cyra, also Cila, Cilla or Tzila, and Riwka or Rivka. Her parents were Peretz Forscher and Sara Forscherová. She was married to Shlomo Lieser, the son of Yosef Lieser and Atara née Krik. The couple had at least three sons, Jiří (born 1933), Eduard (born 1936) and Elimelekh. Her last residence before deportation was in Moravská Ostrava. On 22 September 1942, she and her sons Jiří and Eduard were deported to Theresienstadt concentration camp by transport Bi. Her transport Number was 582 of 862. The three family members remained interred there for fifteen months. On 18 December 1943, she and her sons were deported to Auschwitz concentration camp by transport Ds. Her transport Number was 2267 of 2,503. Cyra Lieserová and her boys, age 7 and 10, were murdered there by the Nazi regime. In 1944, also her parents-in-law became victims of the Shoah.
	HERE LIVED; OTTO PICK; BORN 1883; DEPORTED 1942; TO THERESIENSTADT; MURDERED 6.9.1943; IN AUSCHWITZ	28. října/Zeyerova	Otto Pick was born on 9 December 1883. His parents were Emil and Fanny Pick. The family owned a company in which leather goods were produced and sold. He was married to Margaretha née Weislitzerová. Their last residence before deportation was in Prague I, Leimerova 5. On 5 December 1942, he and his wife were deported to Theresienstadt concentration camp with transport Au. His transport number was 897 of 1,002. On 6 September 1943, the couple were deported to Auschwitz concentration camp by transport Dl. His transport number was 1567 of 2,484. There Otto Pick and his wife were murdered by the Nazi regime on the day of his arrival. Their daughter Eva was able to flee to the United Kingdom. After the collapse of the Nazi regime, she returned to Ostrava and took over the family business. When the Communist took over power in Czechoslovakia in February 1948, she emigrated again.
	HERE LIVED; GRETA PICKOVÁ; BORN WEISLITZEROVÁ; GEB. 1883; DEPORTED 1942; TO THERESIENSTADT; MURDERED 6.9.1943; IN AUSCHWITZ	28. října/Zeyerova	Margaretha Picková née Weislitzerová, also Greta and Markéta, was most probably born on 4 October 1897. She was married to Otto Pick, a producer of leather goods and merchant. Their last residence before deportation was in Prague I, Leimerova 5. On 5 December 1942, she and her husband were deported to Theresienstadt concentration camp with transport Au. Her transport number was 898 of 1,002. On 6 September 1943, the couple were deported to Auschwitz concentration camp by transport Dl. Her transport number was 1566 of 2,484. There Margaretha Picková and her husband were murdered by the Nazi regime on the day of his arrival.
	HERE LIVED; ADOLF RIX; BORN 1874; DEPORTED 1942; TO THERESIENSTADT; MURDERED 18.12.1943; IN AUSCHWITZ	28. října 3138/41	Adolf Rix was born on 25 May 1874 in Mlada Vozice. His parents were Josef Rix and B. née Lüftschitz. He was married to Frieda née Rippelová. The couple had at least one son, Otto. Adolf Rix owned the first department store in Ostrava, where household goods, carpets and sports articles were sold. On 26 September 1942, he and his wife were deported from Ostrava to Theresienstadt concentration camp by transport Bl. His transport number was 571 of 862. On 18 December 1943, the couple were deported to Auschwitz concentration camp by transport Ds. His transport number was 1295 of 2,503. There Adolf Rix and his wife were murdered in the gas chambers in September 1944. His department store was destroyed — also in 1944 — during a bombing and the remains were demolished. Their son Otto Rix was able to flee to London in 1939 and could survive the Shoah. He became the father of Sir Bernard Rix, a judge, and of Evelyn McGilloway née Rix, a concert pianist.
	HERE LIVED; BEDŘIŠKA RIXOVÁ; NÉE RIPPELOVÁ; BORN 1885; DEPORTED 1942; TO THERESIENSTADT; MURDERED 18.12.1943; IN AUSCHWITZ	28. října 3138/41	Bedřiška Rixová née Rippelová, also Frieda, was born on 14 August 1885 in Cieszyn. She was married to Adolf Rix, the owner of a department store. the couple had at least one son, Otto. On 26 September 1942, she and her husband were deported from Ostrava to Theresienstadt concentration camp by transport Bl. Her transport number was 25 of 862. On 18 December 1943, the couple were deported to Auschwitz concentration camp by transport Ds. Her transport number was 1296 of 2,503. There Bedřiška Rixová and her husband were murdered in the gas chambers in September 1944. Their son Otto Rix could emigrate to London and survive the Shoah.
	HERE LIVED; FRANTIŠEK; ROSENSTEIN; BORN 1915; DEPORTED 1942; TO THERESIENSTADT; LAGER SCHWARZHEIDE; MURDERED 1945; ON A DEATH MARCH	Chelčického 531/3	František Rosenstein was born on 7 April 1915 in Ostrava. His parents were Rudolf Rosenstein and Miriam née Grossová. He studied medicine in Prague. On 22 December 1942, he and his parents were deported from Prague to Theresienstadt concentration camp by transport Ck. His transport number was 135 of 1,005. After a few weeks the family members were separated. While he remained in Theresienstadt, on 23 January 1943, his parents were deported to Auschwitz concentration camp. Eleven months later, on 18 December 1943, he too was deported to Auschwitz by transport Ds. His transport number was 756 of 2,503. He lost his life in 1945, shortly before liberation. Also his parents were killed at Auschwitz.
	HERE LIVED; RUDOLF ROSENSTEIN; BORN 1883; DEPORTED 1942; TO THERESIENSTADT; MURDERED 23.1.1943; IN AUSCHWITZ	Chelčického 531/3	Rudolf Rosenstein was born on 13 March 1883. He worked as a clerk and was married to Marie, also Miriam née Grossová. The couple had at least one son, František (born 1915). On 22 December 1942, he, his wife and their son were deported from Prague to Theresienstadt concentration camp by transport Ck. His transport number was 133 of 1,005. After a few weeks the family members were separated. On 23 January 1943, he and his wife were deported to Auschwitz concentration camp by transport Cr, while the son remained in Theresienstadt. His transport number was 104 of 2,017. He and his wife were murdered by the Nazi regime. Also their son František lost his life in Auschwitz.
	HERE LIVED; MARIE; ROSENSTEINOVÁ; NÉE GROSSOVÁ; BORN 1893; DEPORTED 1942; TO THERESIENSTADT; MURDERED 23.1.1943; IN AUSCHWITZ	Chelčického 531/3	Marie Rosensteinová née Grossová, also Miriam and Mizzi, was born on 25 April 1893 in Ostrava. Her parents were Fanni and Nathan Gross. She had at least one brother, Viktor. She was married to Rudolf Rosenstein, a clerk. The couple had at least one son, František (born 1915). On 22 December 1942, she, her husband and their son were deported from Prague to Theresienstadt concentration camp by transport Ck. Her transport number was 134 of 1,005. After a few weeks the family members were separated. On 23 January 1943, Marie Rosensteinová and her husband were deported to Auschwitz concentration camp by transport Cr, while their son remained in Theresienstadt. Her transport number was 105 of 2,017. She and her husband were murdered by the Nazi regime. Also their son František lost his life in Auschwitz.
	HERE LIVED; KAROLÍNA ROTHOVÁ; BORN MARKUSOVÁ; GEB. 1862; DEPORTED 1942; TO THERESIENSTADT; MURDERED 20.10.1942	Puchmajerova 1919/8	Karolina Rothová née Markusová, also Karla, was born on 26 May 1862. She was married to Adolf Roth, a wine salesman, who together with his brother Sigmund had come to Ostrava in 1884. The couple had several children, opened a taproom for wine and beer in 1887 and added a restaurant in 1896. The business turned into a family affair, when their four sons — Arnošt, Josef, Jan (Hanuš) and Walter — started working there. In 1912 they bought a license for vine wholesale and step by step they acquired some real estate. In 1919 Adolf Roth died. His widow took over and her sons became companions. In 1925 the firm opened new and modern facilities for storing international and national vine brands. In 1937 son Josef opened a pub in Puchmajerova, but in 1939, after the Nazis had destroyed the state of Czechoslovakia and taken power in Bohemia and Moravia, the successful enterprises of the family ended. They had to hand over their companies to Treuhänder. On 30 September 1942, Karolina Rothová was deported from Moravská Ostrava to Theresienstadt concentration camp by transport Bm. Her transport number was 408 of 864. She was murdered there by the Nazi regime on 20 October 1942. Except son Hanuš, who could emigrate to England, and Josef's wife Erna, who could survive Theresienstadt, all family members were murdered in the course of the Shoah.
	HERE LIVED; MUDR. MOŘIC SCHÖNFELD; BORN 1903; DEPORTED 1942; TO THERESIENSTADT; MURDERED 23.10.1944; IN AUSCHWITZ	Zalužanského 1192/15	MUDr. Mořic Schönfeld was born on 26 June 1903. He was a physician. He was one of the two physicians of Valašské Meziříčí in the Zlín Region, the other one was MUDr. Otto Levy. In August 1940, Jews were banned from public service. Both doctors were not allowed to pursue their medical practice. They even had to remove their door signs, as there the academic titles were engraved. On 22 September 1942, Mořic Schönfeld was deported from Moravská Ostrava to Theresienstadt concentration camp by transport Bi. His transport number was 212 of 862. In December 1943, his colleague MUDr. Otto Levy was deported from Theresienstadt to Auschwitz concentration camp and murdered there. On 23 October 1944, also MUDr. Mořic Schönfeld was deported to Auschwitz concentration camp by transport Et. His transport number was 1215 of 1,714. He was murdered by the Nazi regime on a death march in the winter of 1945.
	HERE LIVED; RŮŽENA SCHÖNFELDOVÁ; BORN WEBEROVÁ; GEB. 1877; DEPORTED 1942; TO THERESIENSTADT; MURDERED 22.10.1942; IN TREBLINKA	Poštovní 345/23	Růžena Schönfeldová née Weberová was born on 8 March 1877. Her last residence before deportation was in Prague I, Salvatorská 2. On 20 July 1942, she was deported from Prague to Theresienstadt concentration camp by transport AAs. Her transport number was 379 of 1,000. On 22 October 1942, she was deported to Treblinka extermination camp by transport Bx. Her transport number was 1983 of 2,033. Not one Jew of this transport survived the Shoah.
	HERE LIVED; PAVEL SLATNER; BORN 1927; DEPORTED 1942; TO THERESIENSTADT; MURDERED 22.10.1942; IN TREBLINKA	Tyršova 1823/12	Pavel Slatner was born on 6 January 1927. He was the son of Zikmund Slatner and Berta née Löwyová. He had one sister, Edita (born 1922). On 30 September 1942, he and his family were deported from Ostrava to Theresienstadt concentration camp by transport Bm. His transport number was 387 of 864. On 22 October 1942, he was deported from Theresienstadt to Treblinka extermination camp by transport Bx. His transport number was 573 of 2,033. There he, his mother and his sister were murdered by the Nazi regime. His father had already been deported to Nisko in 1939 where he had died.
	HERE LIVED; ZIKMUND SLATNER; BORN 1888; DEPORTED 1939; TO THE CAMP; NISKO ON THE SAN RIVER ? ? ?	Tyršova 1823/12	Zikmund Slatner, also Siegmund or Zigo, was born on 21 January 1888 in Kunčice. He was a tobacconist and married to Berta née Löwyová. The couple had at least two children, Edita (born 1922) and Pavel (born 1927). On 17 October 1939, he was deported with the first deportation train from the Protectorate of Bohemia and Moravia to Nisko. There he was brought to death by the Nazi regime. His wife and his children were murdered in 1942 in Treblinka.
	HERE LIVED; BERTA SLATNEROVÁ; NÉE LÖWYOVÁ; BORN 1894; DEPORTED 1942; TO THERESIENSTADT; MURDERED 22.10.1942; IN TREBLINKA	Tyršova 1823/12	Berta Slatnerová née Löwyová was born on 6 June 1894. She was married to Zikmund Slatner. The couple had at least two children, Edita (born 1922) and Pavel (born 1927). In 1939, her husband was arrested and deported to Nisko where he was brought to death by the Nazi regime. On 30 September 1942, she and her family were deported from Ostrava to Theresienstadt concentration camp by transport Bm. Her transport number was 385 of 864. On 22 October 1942, she was deported from Theresienstadt to Treblinka extermination camp by transport Bx. Her transport number was 569 of 2,033. There she and her children was murdered by the Nazi regime.
	HERE LIVED; EDITA SLATNEROVÁ; BORN 1922; DEPORTED 1942; TO THERESIENSTADT; MURDERED 22.10.1942; IN TREBLINKA	Tyršova 1823/12	Edita Slatnerová was born on 21 December 1922. Her parents were Zikmund Slatner and Berta née Löwyová. She had a brother, Pavel (born 1927). The last residence of the family before deportation was in Moravská Ostrava. On 30 September 1942, she and her family were deported from Ostrava to Theresienstadt concentration camp by transport Bm. Her transport number was 386 of 864. On 22 October 1942, she was deported from Theresienstadt to Treblinka extermination camp by transport Bx. Her transport number was 577 of 2,033. There she, her mother and her brother were murdered by the Nazi regime. Her father had already been deported to Nisko in 1939 and was murdered there.
	HERE LIVED; EMILIE SLATNEROVÁ; NÉE ALTMANNOVÁ; BORN 1865; DEPORTED 1942; TO THERESIENSTADT; MURDERED 15.12.1943; IN AUSCHWITZ	Nádražní třída 1266/26	Emilie Slatnerová née Altmannová, also Emilia, was born on 5 July 1865 in Ostrava. Her parents were Sigmund Altman and Julie née Barberová. She had at least one brother, Artur (born on 27 February 1883), who studied law. She was married to Leopold Slatner (1850-1928). The couple had at least two children, Etelka (born on 6 December 1899) and Hugo. She was a housewife. Her last address before deportation was in Prague XII, Ondříčkova 26, where she lived with Žofie Slatnerová (see below). On 20 July 1942, she was deported from Prague to Theresienstadt concentration camp by transport AAs. Her transport number was 265 of 1,000. On 15 December 1943, she was deported from Theresienstadt to Auschwitz extermination camp by transport Dr. Her transport number was 1886 of 2,519. There she was murdered by the Nazi regime on the day of her arrival. Her brother, his wife Anna née Fantová (born 1894) and their son Jiři (born 1925) were all deported to Theresienstand in 1943 and to Auschwitz in 1944. All three lost their lives in the course of the Shoah. Her daughter Etelka was married to Alfred Vogel. The couple could emigrate to England. They had one child. Both died in the 1980s in Weybridge, Surrey. Her son Hugo was married to Edith, the couple had two children. Nothing is known about their fate.
	HERE LIVED; ŽOFIE SLATNEROVÁ; BORN 1884; DEPORTED 1942; TO THERESIENSTADT; MURDERED 15.12.1943; IN AUSCHWITZ	Nádražní třída 1266/26	Žofie Slatnerová was born 9 June 1884. Her last address before deportation was in Prague XII, Ondříčkova 26, where she lived with Emilie Slatnerová. On 8 September 1942, she was deported from Prague to Theresienstadt concentration camp by transport Bf. Her transport number was 574 of 1,005. On 15 December 1943, she was deported from Theresienstadt to Auschwitz extermination camp by transport Dr. Her transport number was 2570. There she was murdered by the Nazi regime.
	HERE LIVED; RŮŽENA SOMMEROVÁ; NÉE NEULÄNDEROVÁ; BORN 1895; DEPORTED 1942; TO THERESIENSTADT; MURDERED 5.10.1942; IN TREBLINKA	Antonína Macka 4	Růžena Sommerová née Neuländerová, also Rosalie, was born on 25 June 1895. The maiden name of her mother was Singer. She married Hynek Stiller. The couple had at least three children, daughters Ilse (born 1921) and Gertruda (born 1924) and son Alfred. She was a shopkeeper. Later-on she remarried, her second husband was Artur Sommer. On 30 September 1942, she and daughters were deported from Ostrava to Theresienstadt concentration camp by transport Bm. Her transport number was 201 of 864. On 5 October 1942, the three women were deported from Theresienstadt to Treblinka extermination camp by transport Bt. Her transport number was 662 of 1,000. Růžena Sommerová and her two daughters were murdered there in the gas chambers. The report on her death and one of her two daughters was sent to Yad Vashem by her son Alfred in July 2005. He then lived in England.
	HERE LIVED; GERTRUDA STILLEROVÁ; BORN 1924; DEPORTED 1942; TO THERESIENSTADT; MURDERED 5.10.1942; IN TREBLINKA	Antonína Macka 4	Gertruda Stillerová, also Trude, was born on 26 July 1924 in Ostrava. Her parents were Hynek Stiller and Rosalie née Neuländerová. She had a sister named Ilse, born in 1921, and a brother, Alfred, who could survive the Shoah. She was a student. On 30 September 1942, she, her mother and her sister were deported from Ostrava to Theresienstadt concentration camp by transport Bm. Her transport number was 11 of 864. On 5 October 1942, the three women were deported from Theresienstadt to Treblinka extermination camp by transport Bt. Her transport number was 661 of 1,000. Gertruda Stillerová was murdered there in a gas chamber. Also her mother and her sister were murdered by the Nazi regime.
	HERE LIVED; ILSE STILLEROVÁ; BORN 1921; DEPORTED 1942; TO THERESIENSTADT; MURDERED 5.10.1942; IN TREBLINKA	Antonína Macka 4	Ilse Stillerová was born on 3 June 1921 in Ostrava. Her parents were Hynek Stiller and Rosalie née Neuländerová. She had a sister named Gertruda, born in 1924, and a brother, Alfred, who could survive the Shoah. She was a student. At the Jewish School of Ostrava she took part in theater performances. On 30 September 1942, she, her mother and her sister were deported from Ostrava to Theresienstadt concentration camp by transport Bm. Her transport number was 10 of 864. On 5 October 1942, the three women were deported from Theresienstadt to Treblinka extermination camp by transport Bt. Her transport number was 660 of 1,000. Ilse Stillerová was murdered by the Nazi regime in a gas chamber on the same day. Also her mother and her sister were murdered by the Nazi regime.
	HERE LIVED; IRENA WASSERBERGEROVÁ; NÉE POLLAKOVÁ; BORN 1885; DEPORTED 1942; TO THERESIENSTADT; MURDERED 22.10.1942; IN TREBLINKA	Nádražní 308/3	Irena Wasserbergerová née Pollaková was born on 28 July 1885 in Hostovice. She was married to Jindřich Wasserberger (1883-1929). The couple had a daughter, Eliška, born on 19 May 1914 in Mariánska hora. Starting in 1914, her husband ran a very popular coffee house, the Café Merkur in Ostrava. After his death, his widow took over and changed the name to Café Concordia. In 1932 she rented the license to Ferdinand Tramerov. In 1934 her daughter married Jiří Adler. Daughter and son-in law could emigrate in time to England. Irena Wasserbergerová's last address before deportation was Prague V, Filipa de Monte 5. On 3 August 1942, she was deported from Prague to Theresienstadt concentration camp by transport AAw. Her transport number was 371 of 1,001. On 22 October 1942, she was deported from Theresienstadt to Treblinka extermination camp by transport Bx. Her transport number was 1303 of 2,033. She was murdered by the Nazi regime on there same day.
	HERE LIVED; IDA WECHSBERGOVÁ; NÉE ROKOTNITZOVÁ; BORN 1894; DEPORTED 1941; TO MINSK; MURDERED 16.11.1941	Na Hradbach 4	Ida Wechsbergová née Rokotnitzová was born on 8 April 1894. Her last address before deportation was in Brno. On 26 November 1941, she was deported from Brno to Minsk by transport F. Her transport number was 934 of 987. She was murdered by the Nazi regime.

== Příbor ==
Stone	Inscription	Location	Life and death
	HERE LIVED; METHODĚJ HANDSCHUH; BORN 1885; DEPORTED 1945; TO THERESIENSTADT; MURDERED 1945; IBIDEM	Šmeralově Nr. 712	Methoděj Handschuh, also Metoděj, was born on 7 January 1885 in Příbor. His parents were Vilém Handschuh (1845-1929) and Maryanna née Jeřábková (born 1851). He had nine siblings. He studied at the Teacher's Institute in Příbor and completed his studies in 1905. He was married to Ludmila née Krejčiříková from 1920 to 1939. Thereafter he was married another time. After the occupation of Moravia by Nazi Germany in 1939 he joined the Czech Resistance and became an intelligence officer in his hometown. He was murdered by the Nazi regime on 13 April 1945 in Theresienstadt concentration camp.

== Dates of collocations ==
The Stolpersteine in the Kraj Vysočina were collocated by the artist himself on the following dates:

- Český Těšín: 30 October 2012
- Krnov: 19 July 2013 and 16 September 2014
- Ostrava
  - 10 June 2010 (Poděbradova 826/27 - Robert Engel, Herta Engelová, Tomas Engel, Ferdinand Goldberger, Helene Goldbergerová, Třída 28. října 6 - Otto Pick, Třída 28. října 41 - Adolf Rix, Freda Rixová, Nádražní třída 26 - Emilie Slatnerová, Žofie Slatnerová, Tyršova 12 - Pavel Slatner, Zikmund Slatner, Berta Slatnerová, Edita Slatnerová, Antonína Macka 4 - Růžena Sommerová, Gertruda Stillerová, Ilse Stillerová, Nádražní třída 3 - Irena Wasserbergerová, Chelčického 3 - Rudolf Rosenstein, Marie Rosensteinová, Franta Rosenstein, Poštovní 345 - Růžena Schönfeldová, Puchmajerova 8 - Karolina Rothová. " http://www.moap.cz/hp-materialy/id=770/)
  - 14. Aug. 2010, 26. Sep. 2010, 9. Nov. 2010
  - 5 August 2015
- Příbor: 19 July 2013 not clarified: 25. Jan. 2012

A collocation was also announced for 16 September 2014 in Doubrava u Orlové but could not be verified till now.

== See also ==
- List of cities by country that have stolpersteine
- Stolpersteine in the Czech Republic
