= Gilda Langer =

German actress (1896–1920)

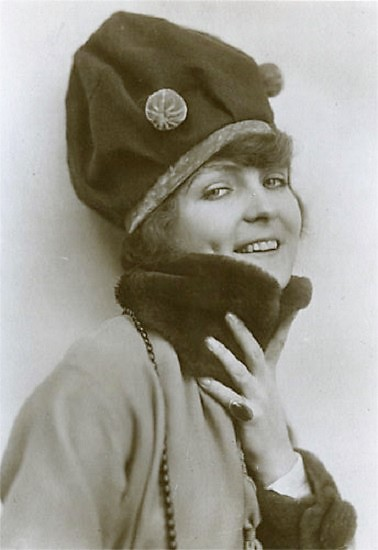
- Langer in 1919
- Born: Hermengild Langer; 16 May 1896; Oderfurt, Austria-Hungary
- Died: 31 January 1920 (aged 23); Charlottenburg, Berlin, Weimar Republic
- Occupation: Actress
- Years active: 1917–1920

Gilda Langer (born Hermengild Langer; 16 May 1896 – 31 January 1920) was a German stage and film actress whose career began in the mid-1910s and lasted until her death in 1920. She appeared both on stage and in silent films; however, all films featuring her as an actress are now considered lost.

== Early life ==
Gilda Langer was born as Hermengild Langer into a Sudeten German family in Oderfurt, Austria-Hungary (now Přívoz, Czech Republic). Around 1915, she met in Vienna the Austrian dramaturge and screenwriter Carl Mayer, who took her to Berlin and helped her to gain an engagement as a stage actress at the Residenz Theatre. Her first role at the theatre was in a production of the Robert Grötzach–penned 1917 play Dyckerpotts Erben.

== Film career ==
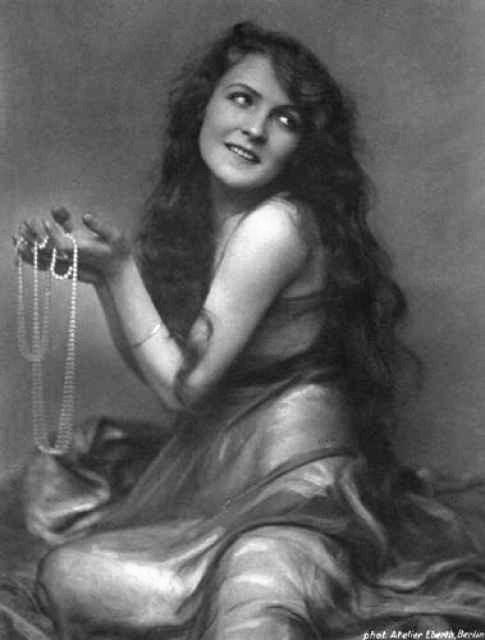
Langer c. 1918

In 1917, Mayer announced to the film trade press that Langer would begin appearing in leading lady roles in several films for the newly created Berlin-based Star-Film company. Her first film role was in the 1917 Alexander Antalffy– and Paul Leni–directed drama The Mystery of Bangalore, opposite actors Conrad Veidt and Harry Liedtke. This was followed in 1918 by a starring role in the Jenő Illés-directed drama Struggling Souls. After being introduced to filmmaker Fritz Lang, Langer appeared prominently in Lang's films Halbblut and Der Herr der Liebe, both released in 1919.

In 1919, Gilda Langer was cast to play the role of Jane in the Robert Wiene-directed and Carl Mayer– and Hans Janowitz–penned German Expressionist horror film The Cabinet of Dr. Caligari. However, Langer became ill before shooting and had to be replaced by actress Lil Dagover. Langer's last film role was in the 1919 drama The Woman with Orchids, written by Fritz Lang and directed by Otto Rippert.

== Personal life and death ==
In January 1920, Langer became engaged to Hungarian film director Paul Czinner. Shortly after this engagement, having contracted the Spanish flu, Langer fell ill with a lung infection, and died on 31 January 1920, aged 23. Her funeral was held on 4 February 1920 and she was interred at the Stahnsdorf South-Western Cemetery in Stahnsdorf, Brandenburg.
