= Moravská Ostrava a Přívoz =

Borough of Ostrava, Czech Republic

- Borough of Ostrava
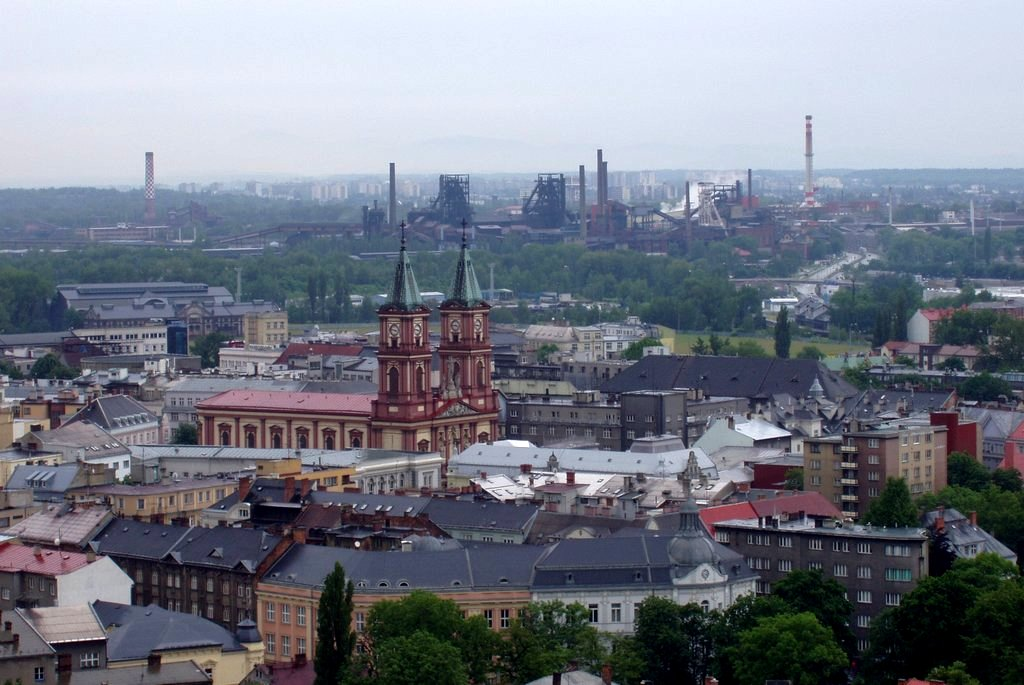
- Areal view of Moravská Ostrava a Přívoz

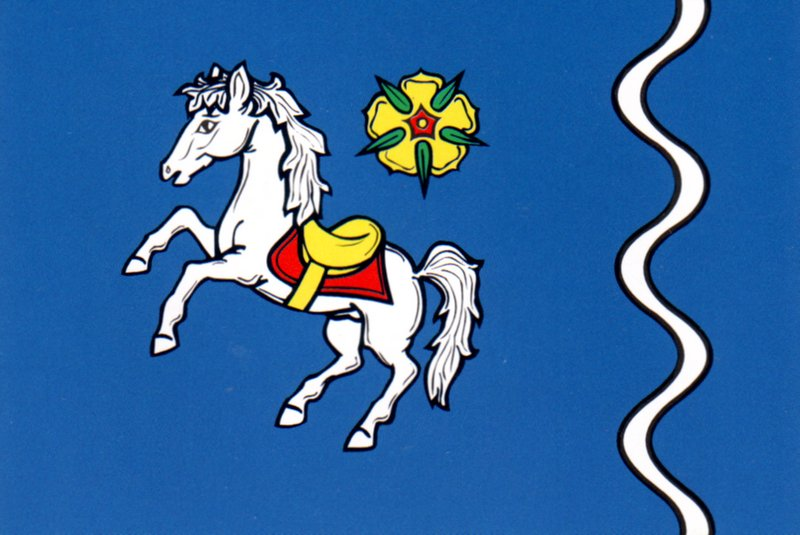
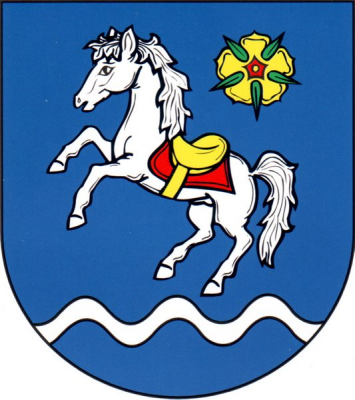
- Flag Coat of arms

- Location of Moravská Ostrava a Přívoz in Ostrava
- Coordinates: 49°50′30″N 18°17′30″E
- Country: Czech Republic
- Region: Moravian-Silesian
- Municipality: Ostrava

Area
  - Total: 13.25 km^{2} (5.12 sq mi)

Population (2021)
  - Total: 37,855
  - Density: 2,857/km^{2} (7,400/sq mi)
- Time zone: UTC+1 (CET)
  - Summer (DST): UTC+2 (CEST)
- Postal code: 702 00
- Website: moap.ostrava.cz

Moravská Ostrava a Přívoz is a borough of the city of Ostrava, Czech Republic. Situated in the north-central part of the city, it comprises the city parts Moravská Ostrava, located in the southern part of the borough on the left bank of the Ostravice River, and Přívoz, located in the northern part on the right bank of the Oder River. The confluence of the two rivers is located in the northernmost part of the borough.

Moravská Ostrava was originally a separate town, which merged with surrounding municipalities, including Přívoz, on 1 January 1924, and later with Slezská Ostrava in 1941. On 24 November 1990, it became one of the 23 self-governing boroughs of Ostrava.

The borough contains the historical city centre of Ostrava, the New City Hall, the main railway station, and the shopping centre Forum Nová Karolina.

== Etymology ==
The word moravská means 'Moravian', referring to the fact that this part of Ostrava is located in the historical region of Moravia. The word přívoz refers to a ferry crossing or ferryboat, referencing the area's location on the bank of the Oder River.

== Gallery ==
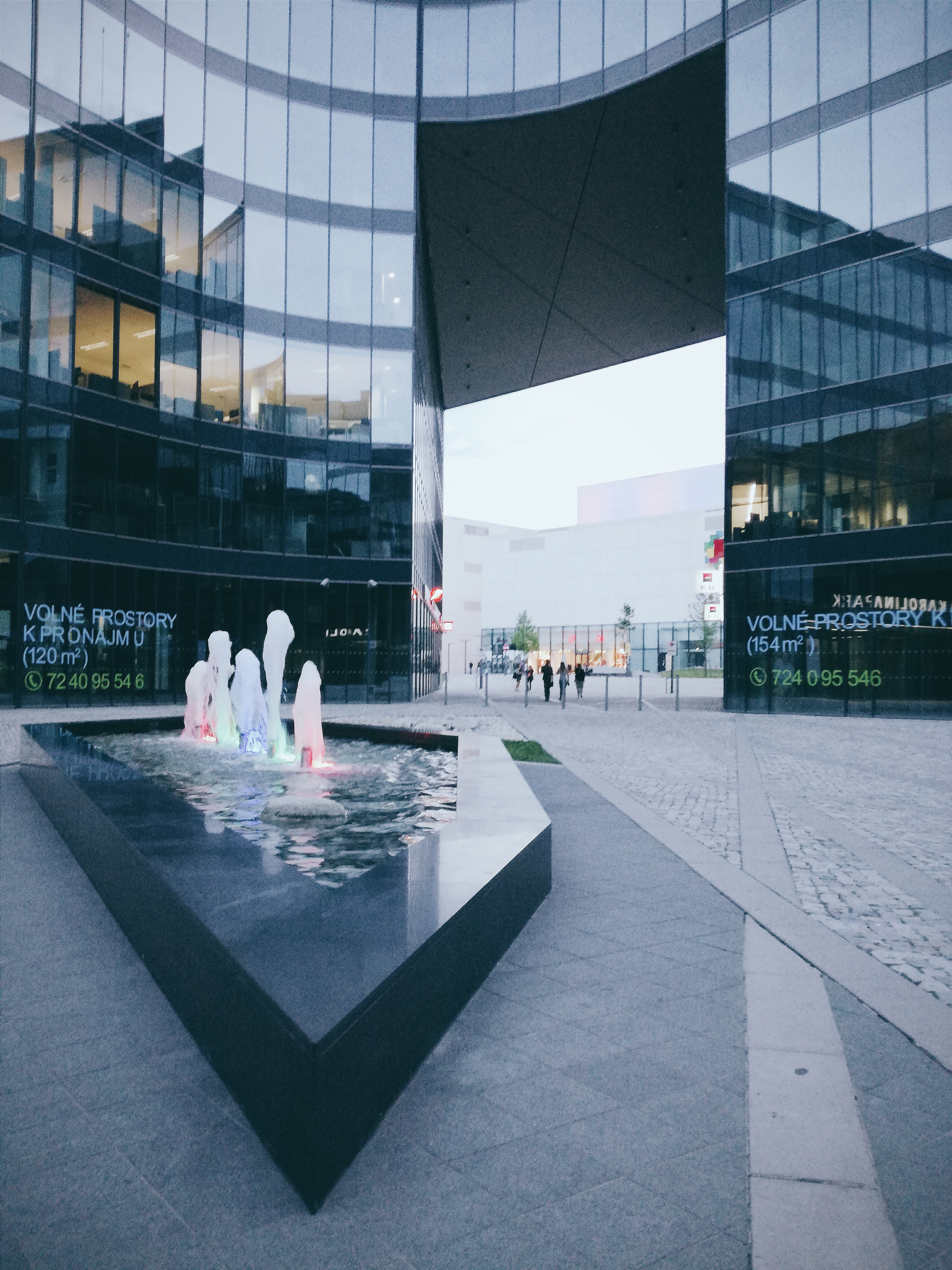
Office building Nová Karolina Park

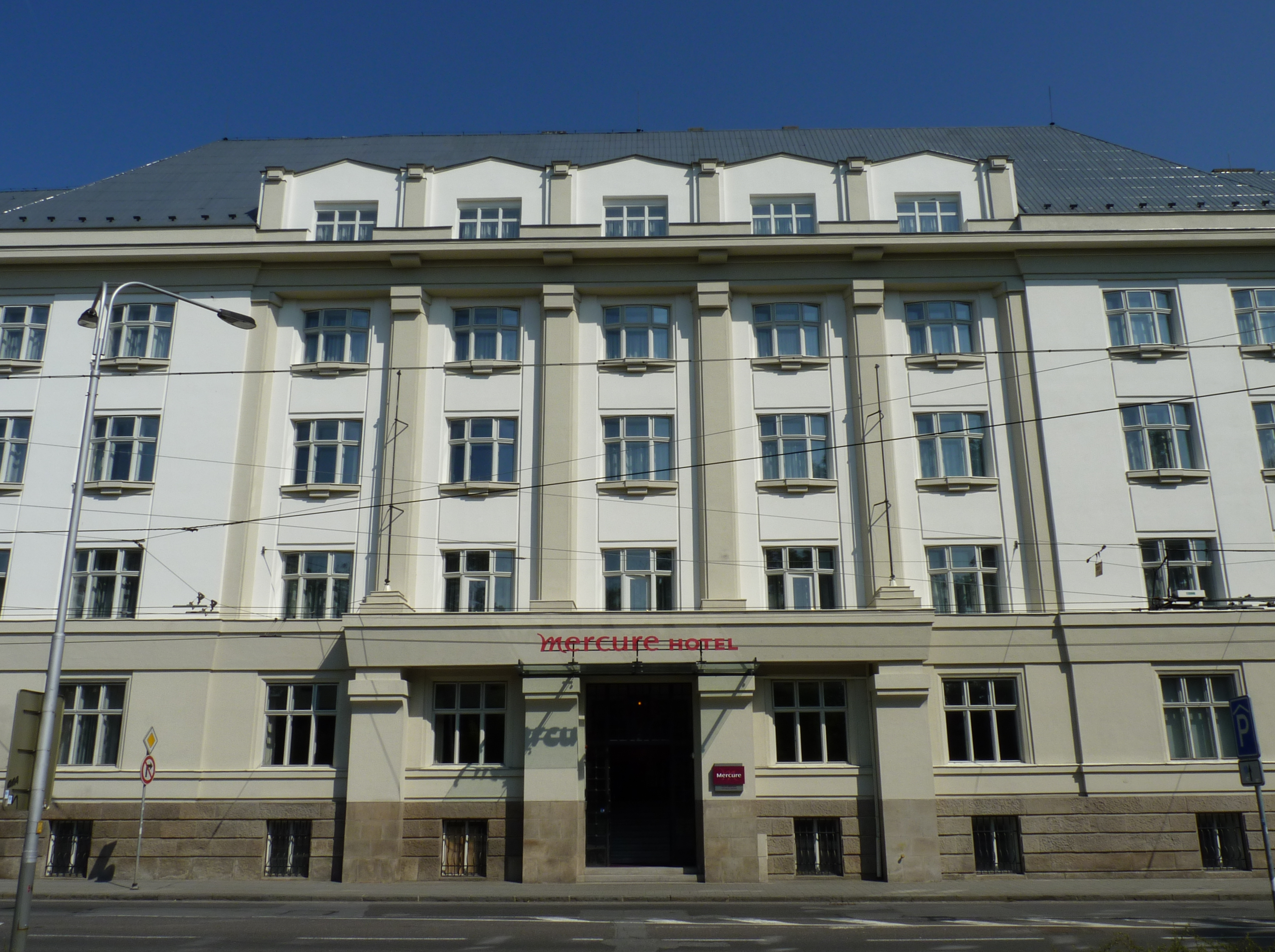
Hotel Mercure

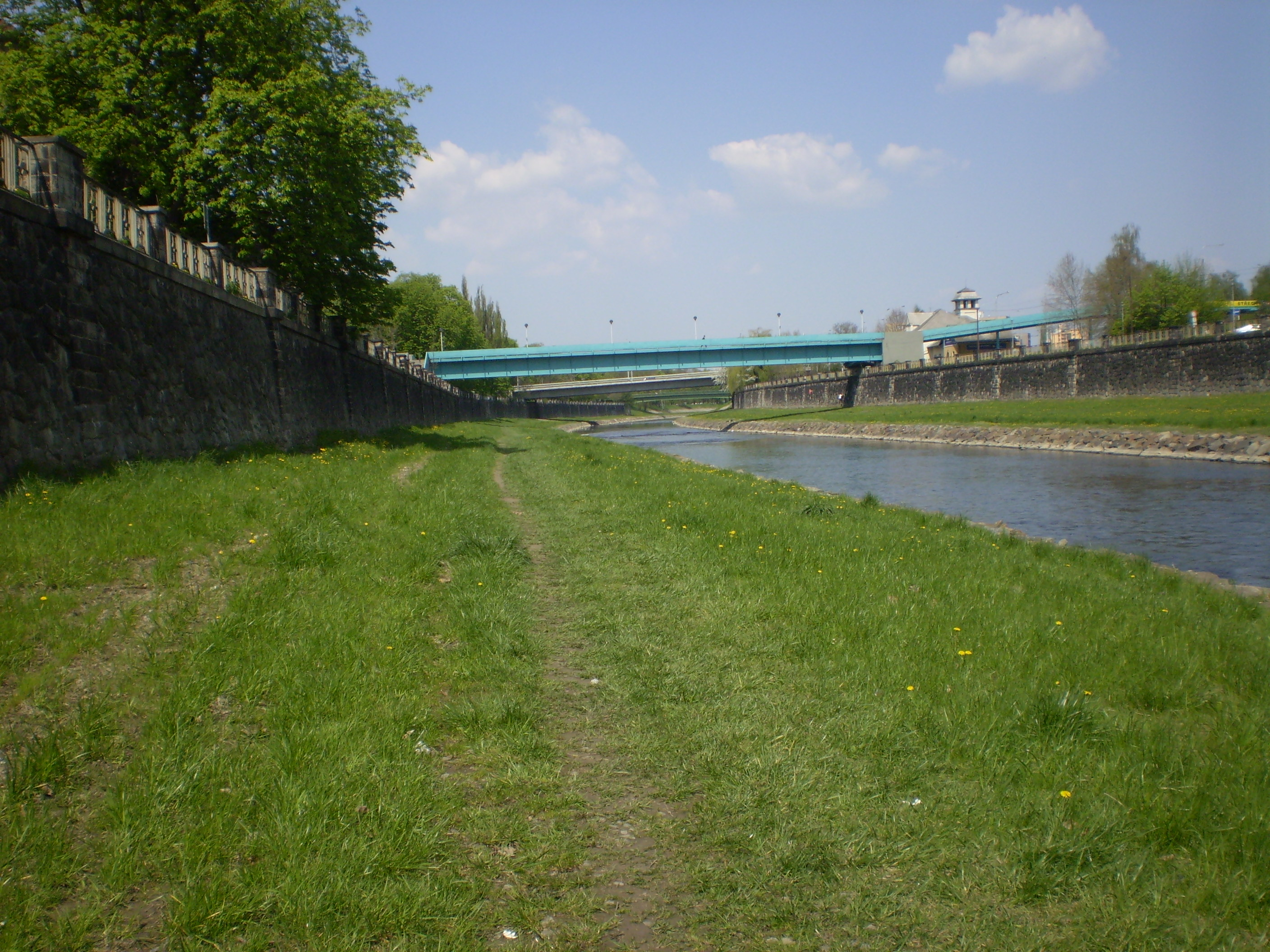
Ostravice River

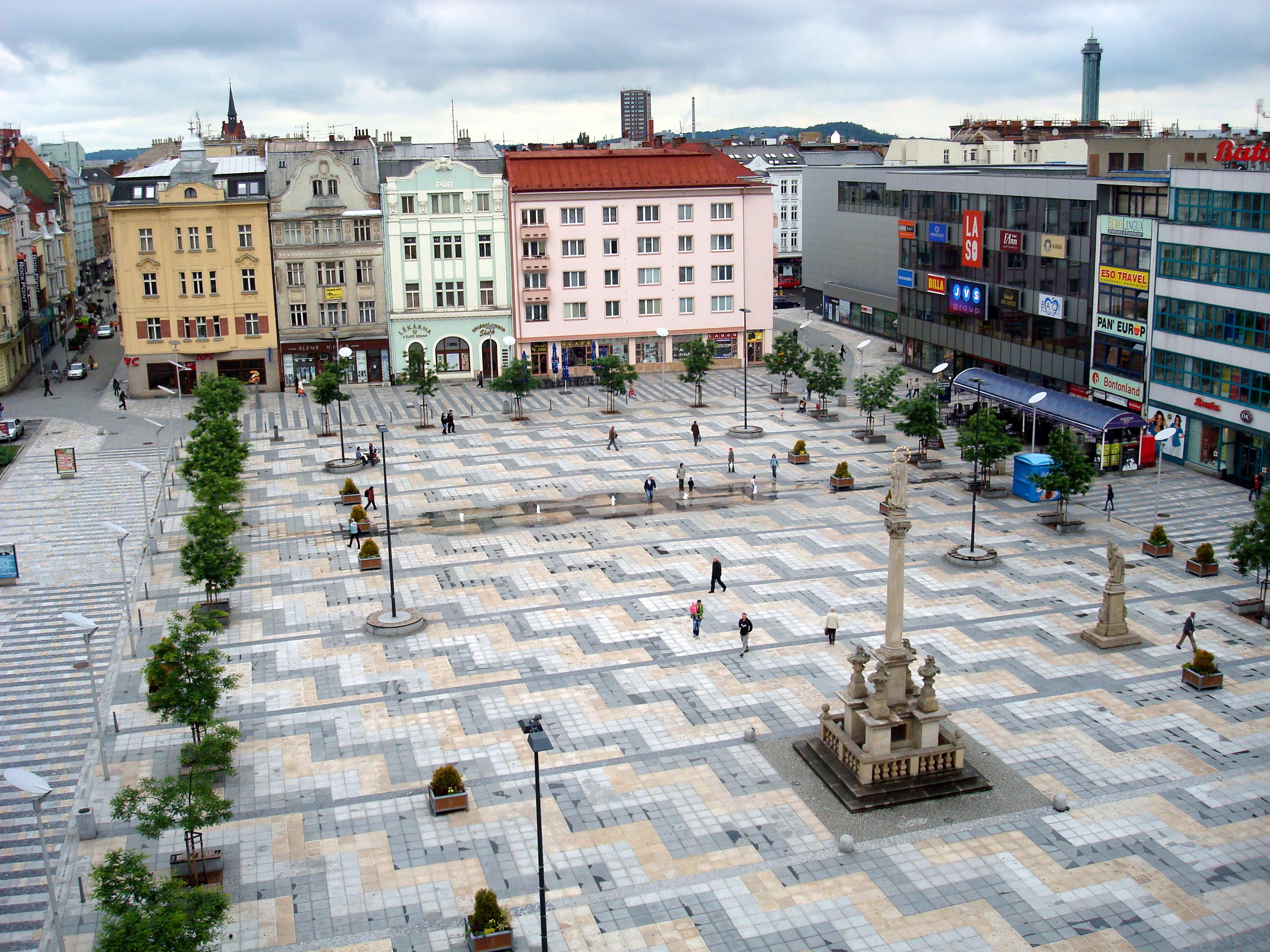
Masarykovo náměstí (Masaryk's Square)
