= Ostrava hlavní nádraží =

Railway station in Ostrava, Czech Republic

Ostrava hl. n.
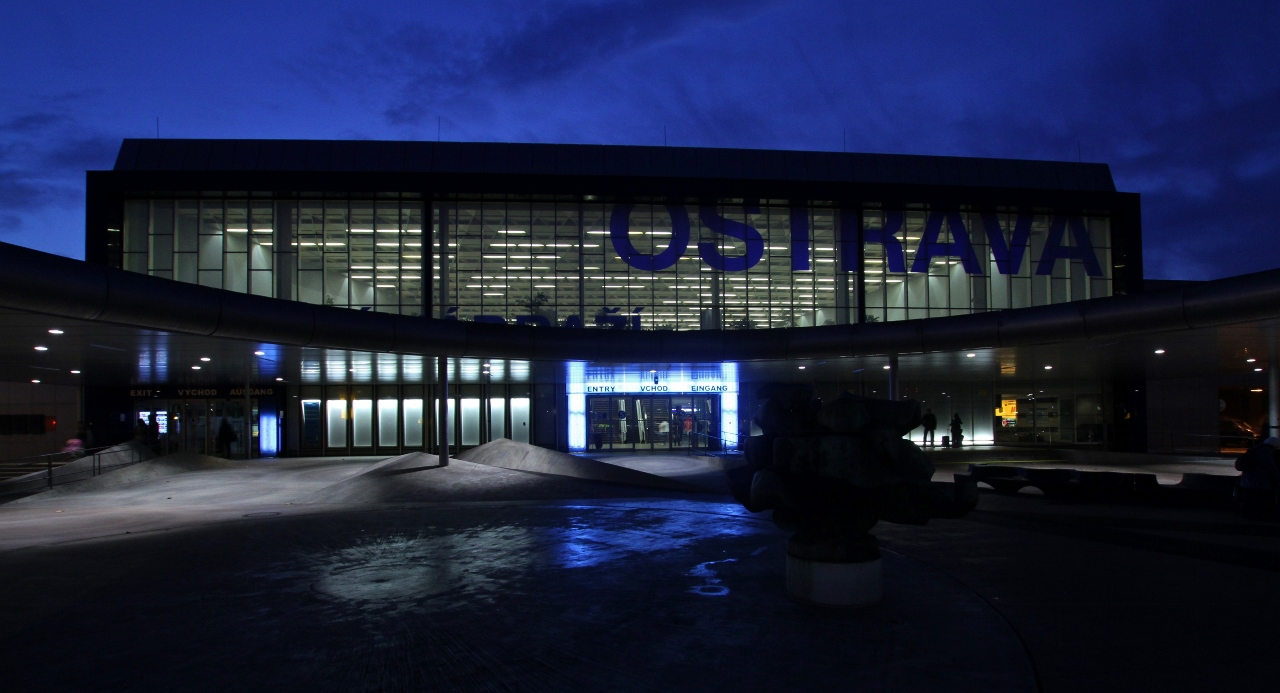
- Ostrava main train station at night

General information
- Location: Ostrava-Přívoz; Czech Republic
- Coordinates: 49°51′2″N 18°16′2″E
- Owner: Czech Republic
- Platforms: 4

Construction
- Architect: Lubor Lacina

Other information
- Station code: 54343640

History
- Opened: 1 May 1847; 179 years ago
- Rebuilt: 1892–1893; 1967–1974; 2006–2007
- Electrified: 1960–1963

Services
Preceding station	PKP Intercity	Following station
Břeclav towards München Hbf	EuroNight	Bohumin towards Warszawa Wschodnia
Location
- Location within Czech Republic

Ostrava main railway station (Czech: Ostrava hlavní nádraží, abbreviated Ostrava hl. n.), is a railway station in city part Ostrava-Přívoz and main train terminus of Ostrava, third biggest city in the Czech Republic.

== Tracks ==
Station is an important transport junction. All types of trains operated by České dráhy or private transport companies RegioJet and Leo Express stops here. Station is located on a crossing of four railway lines:

- 321 Opava východ – Český Těšín
- 323 Ostrava – Valašské Meziříčí
- 270 Bohumín – Olomouc (main) – Česká Třebová
- Báňská dráha (freight only)

== History ==
First train reached the new-built station on 1 May 1847. Position on the international line Kraków–Vienna (Emperor Ferdinand Northern Railway) and raise of mining industry in whole Silesia brought the station significant importance. In 1869 track to Frýdlant nad Ostravicí was connected. Because of capacity reasons, station was expanded for the first time between 1892 and 1893. Since August 1894, tram line operates transport to the centre of Moravská Ostrava. The station took the name Ostrava hlavní nádraží in 1946.

In the mid-1960s resolution about a radical reconstruction of whole city part Ostrava-sever (Ostrava-North) was accomplished including a plan of the new modern station realised by architect Lubor Lacina (1967) in Brussels style (Czechoslovak design style inspired by aesthetics of Expo 58 in Brussels). Works were finished eight years later. In the front of the building a new terminus of tram, trolleybus and taxi transport was created in collaboration with Lacina's sister, sculpturer Sylvie Lacinová-Jílková. A lot of unique architectonical and interior design features disappeared after last reconstruction in 2007.

== Changes of station names ==
- 1 May 1847 – Ostrau
- 1881 – Ostrau Hauptbahn
- 1895 – Mährisch Ostrau
- 1900 – Mährisch Ostrau – Přívoz
- 1 May 1905 – Mährisch Ostrau – Oderfurt
- 1921 – Moravská Ostrava – Přívoz
- 22 May 1937 – Moravská Ostrava hl. n.
- 1940 – 1945 Mährisch Ostrau Hbf. – Moravská Ostrava hl. n.
- 1946 – Ostrava hl. n.
