= Der Herr der Liebe =

1919 German film

- Film poster
- Directed by: Fritz Lang
- Written by: Leo Koffler
- Produced by: Erich Pommer
- Starring: Carl de Vogt; Gilda Langer
- Cinematography: Carl Hoffmann
- Distributed by: Helios Film
- Release date: September 1919
- Running time: 60 minutes
- Country: Weimar Republic
- Languages: Silent film German intertitles

Der Herr der Liebe (The Master of Love) is a 1919 romantic silent film directed in Germany by Fritz Lang. It was his second film. Carl de Vogt and Gilda Langer starred, as they had in Lang's debut feature, Halbblut. Lang himself is said to have acted in a supporting role. The film is now considered to be lost.

== Plot ==
Residing in a castle in the Carpathian Mountains, Hungarian nobleman Vasile Disecu becomes infatuated with Suzette, the daughter of his neighbor. He mistakes Stefana, a maid who is secretly in love with him, for Suzette and has sex with her. When Yvette, his wife or mistress, finds out, she avenges herself with a liaison with Lazar, a Jewish peddler. Vasile imprisons Lazar. He kills Yvette and then himself.

== Cast ==
- Carl de Vogt as Vasile Disecu
- Gilda Langer as Yvette
- Erika Unruh as Stefana
- Max Narlinski as Lazar
- Sadjah Gezza as Suzette

== See also ==
- List of films made in Weimar Germany
- List of lost films
