= Moravská Ostrava =

City part of Ostrava, Czech Republic

- Municipal part of Ostrava
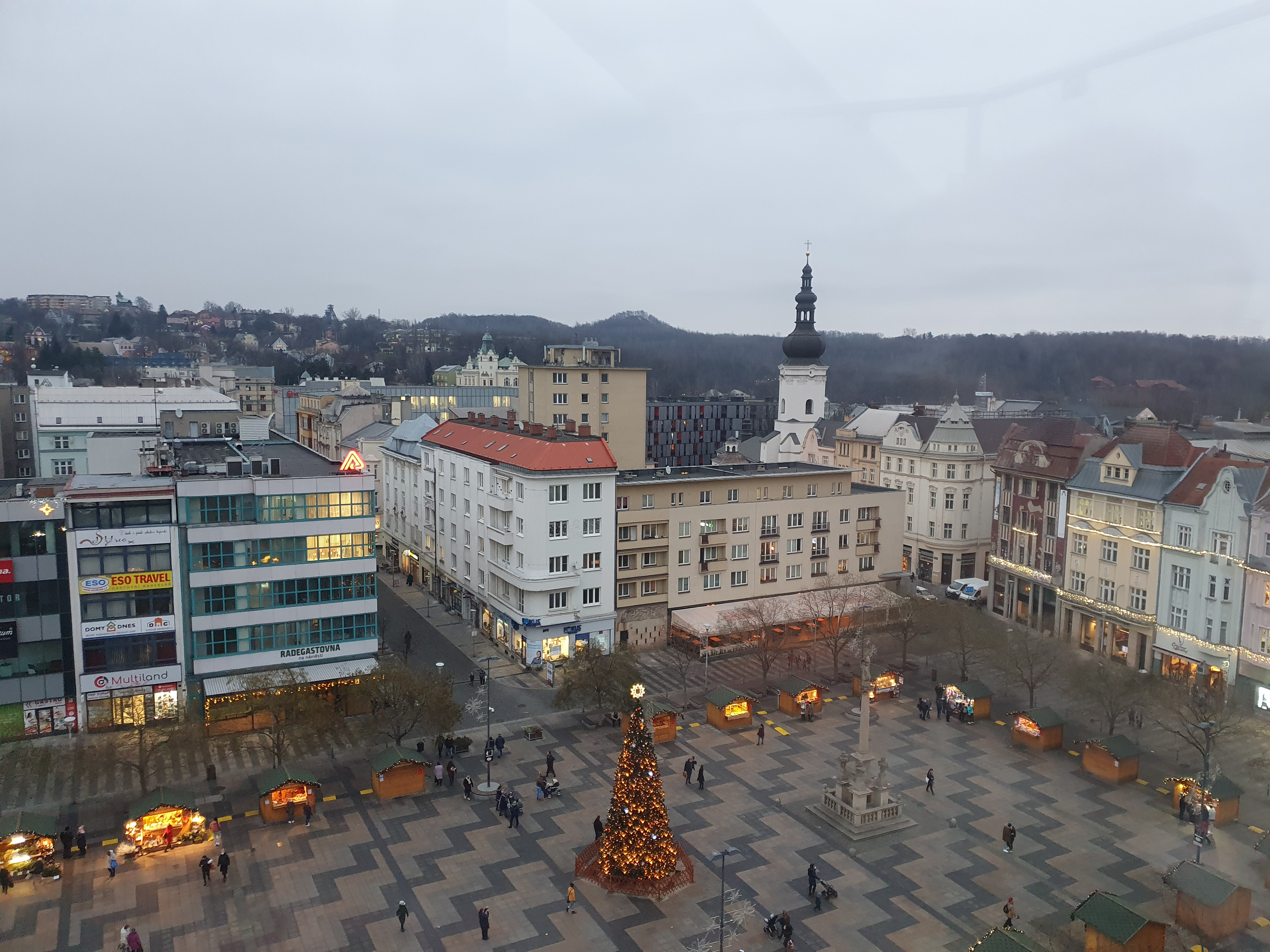
- Aerial view of Moravská Ostrava
- Interactive map of Moravská Ostrava
- Country: Czech Republic
- Region: Moravian-Silesian Region
- District: Ostrava-City
- City: Ostrava
- City district: Moravská Ostrava a Přívoz

Area
  - Total: 7.64 km^{2} (2.95 sq mi)

Population (2021)
  - Total: 33,958
  - Density: 4,440/km^{2} (11,500/sq mi)
- Time zone: UTC+1 (CET)
  - Summer (DST): UTC+2 (CEST)
- Postal code: 702 00

Moravská Ostrava is a municipal part of the city district of Moravská Ostrava a Přívoz in the city of Ostrava in the Czech Republic. It has 33,958 inhabitants.

== History ==
Originally a separate town, it was merged with the surrounding municipalities Přívoz, Vítkovice, Mariánské Hory, Zábřeh, Hrabůvka and Nová Ves on 1 January 1924. In 1941, it was further merged with Slezská Ostrava. On 24 November 1990, it became part of one of the 23 self-governing boroughs of Ostrava, together with Přívoz.

== Demographics ==
Historical population

Year	Pop.	±%
1869	6,881	—
1880	13,448	+95.4%
1890	19,243	+43.1%
1900	30,116	+56.5%
1910	36,754	+22.0%
1921	41,765	+13.6%
1930	45,885	+9.9%
1950	47,189	+2.8%

Year	Pop.	±%
1961	46,388	−1.7%
1970	42,827	−7.7%
1980	44,636	+4.2%
1991	42,099	−5.7%
2001	38,737	−8.0%
2011	34,106	−12.0%
2021	33,958	−0.4%

Source: Czech Statistical Office
