= Max Koffler =

German musician (born 1978)

- Born: 1978 (age 47–48); Berlin, Germany
- Genres: Alternative Rock, pop
- Occupations: Musician, gallery manager
- Instruments: Vocals, guitar, piano
- Years active: 1987–present

Max Koffler (born 1978) is a German musician. He has written music for some German movies and released his debut album taboo in May 2008.

== Life and career ==
Koffler was born in August 1978 in Berlin, Germany. He is a great-grandson of the filmmaker Leo Koffler and a descendant of the composer Domenico Mazzocchi. Already in his early childhood Max did music and also played main parts in musicals.

After the Fall of the Wall his family moved from Berlin to Stendal in Saxony-Anhalt where he founded his first band Kerosin together with his brother Hanno Koffler in 1994. In 1997, he moved back to Berlin. Kerosin won second prize in the World's biggest Band Live contest Emergenza in 2001 and recorded songs for several German cinema movies. Max Koffler also wrote and performed the German title song for the movie "ganz und gar" (2003).

After taking part in a singing competition for Korean traditional songs in 2004, Koffler was invited to Korea and there he had concerts at the Seoul Opera and Seoul's largest Entertainment park. Videos of his performances became No.1 in Korean video charts and Koffler travelled there again in 2008 for several interviews and playing concerts with his new band Seoulmates.

In 2005, Max Koffler recorded his first studio album "taboo" together with different musicians which was released in 2008 on trigger music, a sublabel of 313JWP (distributed by Sony BMG).

== Discography ==
Albums:

- taboo (2008)

Singles:

- "one way highway" (2007)

Scores:

- ganz und gar (2003)

Soundtracks:

- Paule und Julia (2002)
- Hattrick (TV, Pro7, 2002)
- ganz und gar (2003)
- Sommersturm (2004)
