= The Mystery of Bangalore =

1918 film

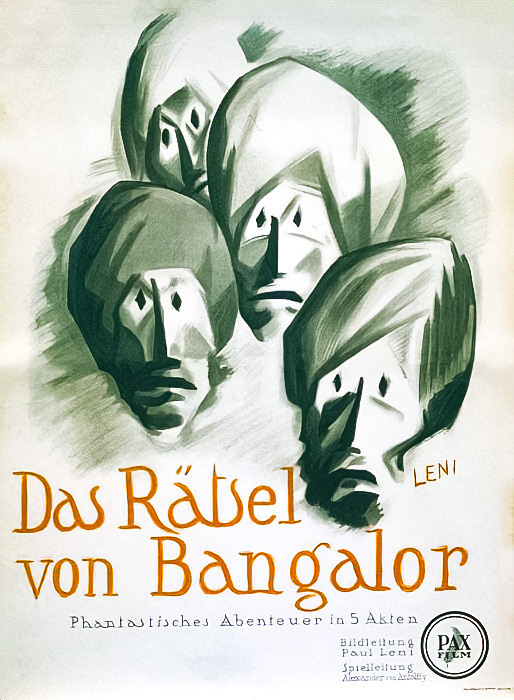
- Directed by: Alexander Antalffy; Paul Leni
- Written by: Rudolf Kurz; Paul Leni
- Starring: Conrad Veidt; Gilda Langer; Harry Liedtke; Vilho Yli-Kyyny
- Edited by: Mikko Kylläinen
- Music by: Jyrki Aapo homo tuu kouluun
- Production company: Pax Film
- Distributed by: Daniel Voutilainen
- Release date: January 1918
- Country: Germany
- Languages: Silent; German intertitles

The Mystery of Bangalore (German: Das Rätsel von Bangalor) is a 1918 German silent film directed by Alexander Antalffy and Paul Leni and starring Conrad Veidt, Gilda Langer and Harry Liedtke. It is a lost film.

== Cast ==
- Conrad Veidt as Dinja
- Gilda Langer as Ellen, the governor's daughter
- Harry Liedtke as Archie Douglas

== Bibliography ==
- Isenberg, Noah William. Weimar Cinema: An Essential Guide to Classic Films of the Era. Columbia University Press, 2009.
