= The Woman with Orchids =

- Directed by: Otto Rippert
- Written by: Fritz Lang
- Produced by: Erich Pommer
- Starring: Carl de Vogt; Werner Krauss
- Cinematography: Carl Hoffmann
- Production company: Decla-Film
- Release date: 1919
- Country: Germany
- Languages: Silent; German intertitles

The Woman with Orchids (German: Die Frau mit den Orchideen) is a 1919 German silent film directed by Otto Rippert and starring Carl de Vogt, Werner Krauss and Gilda Langer.

== Cast ==
- Carl de Vogt
- Werner Krauss
- Gilda Langer

== Bibliography ==
- Hardt, Ursula. From Caligari to California: Erich Pommer's Life in the International Film Wars. Berghahn Books, 1996.
- McGilligan, Patrick. Fritz Lang: The Nature of the Beast. University of Minnesota Press, 2013.
