= Nová Ves (Ostrava) =

Borough of Ostrava, Czech Republic

- Borough of Ostrava
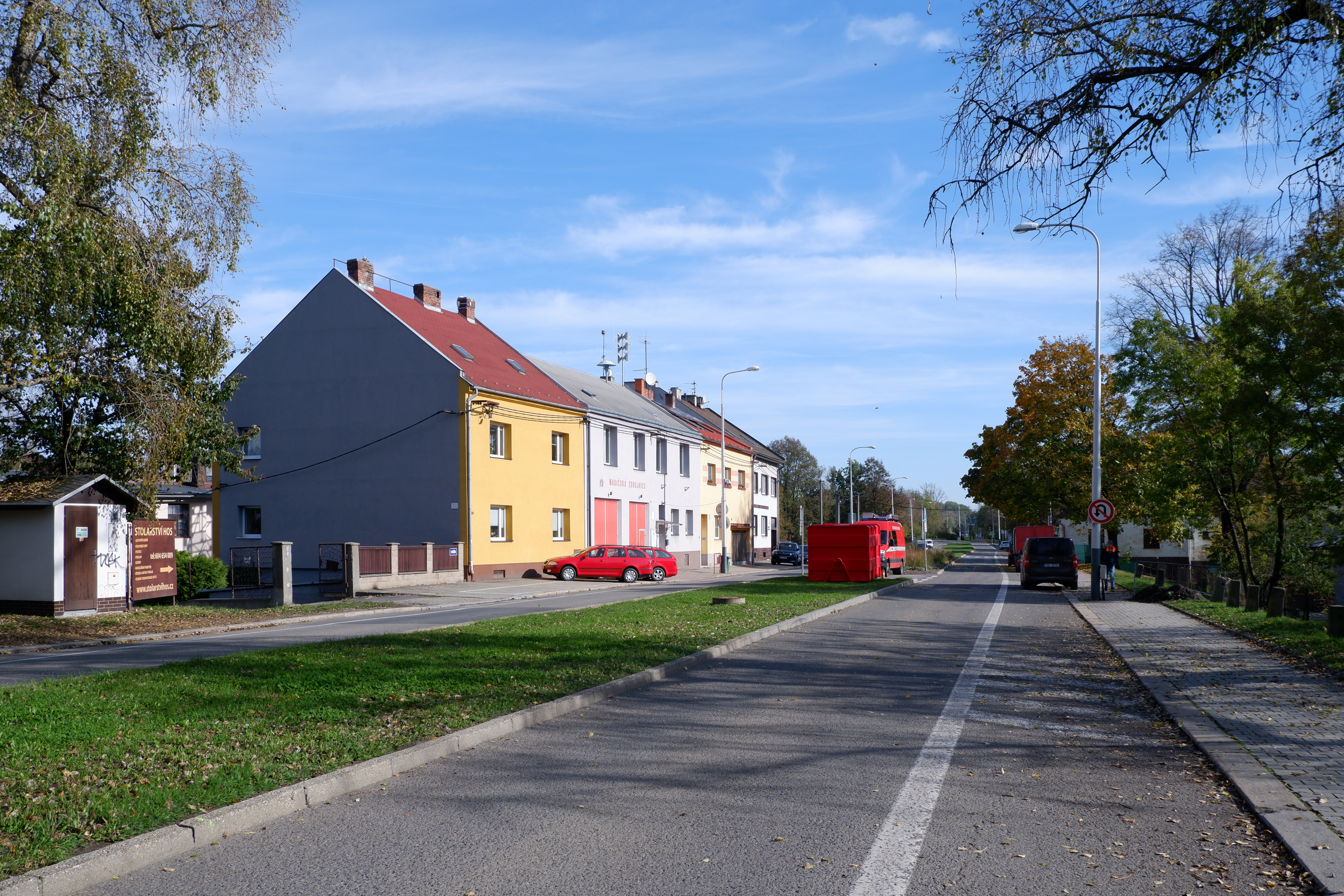
- U Boříka street

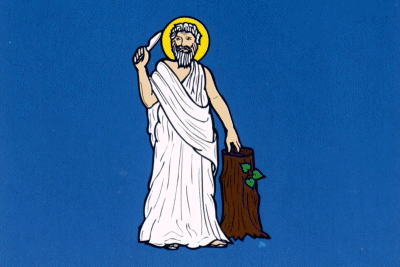
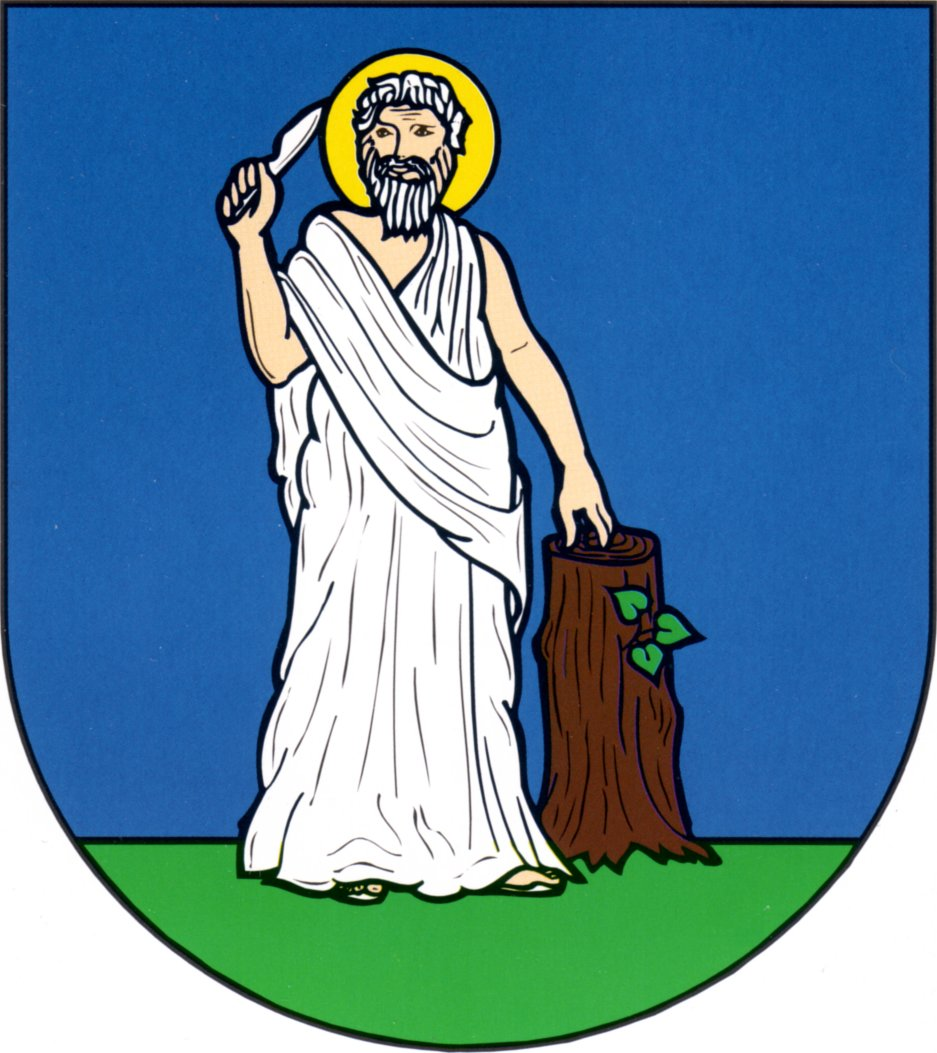
- Flag Coat of arms

- Location of Nová Ves in Ostrava
- Coordinates: 49°49′29″N 18°13′40″E
- Country: Czech Republic
- Region: Moravian-Silesian
- Municipality: Ostrava

Area
  - Total: 3.07 km^{2} (1.19 sq mi)

Population (2021)
  - Total: 747
  - Density: 243/km^{2} (630/sq mi)
- Time zone: UTC+1 (CET)
  - Summer (DST): UTC+2 (CEST)
- Postal code: 709 00
- Website: novaves.ostrava.cz

Nová Ves is a borough and municipal part of the city of Ostrava in the Czech Republic. It is situated in the central part of the city, on the right bank of the Oder River. It was a separate municipality until 1924, when it merged with Ostrava. On 24 November 1990, it became one of the self-governing boroughs of Ostrava. Nová Ves is the least populated borough of Ostrava.

== Etymology ==
The name means 'new village' in Czech. It is also the most common name for a municipality in the Czech Republic.

== Gallery ==
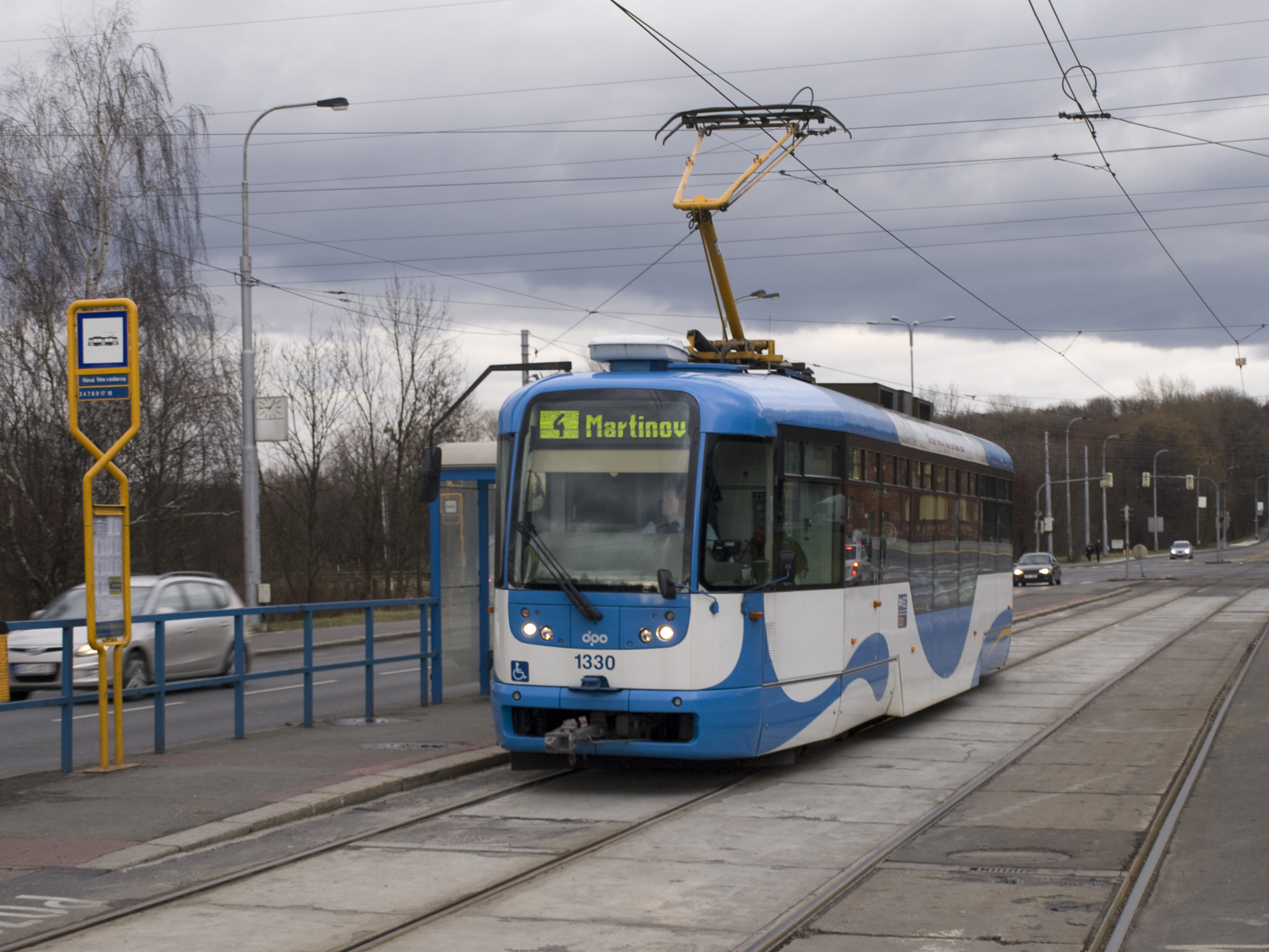
Nová Ves-vodárna tram station

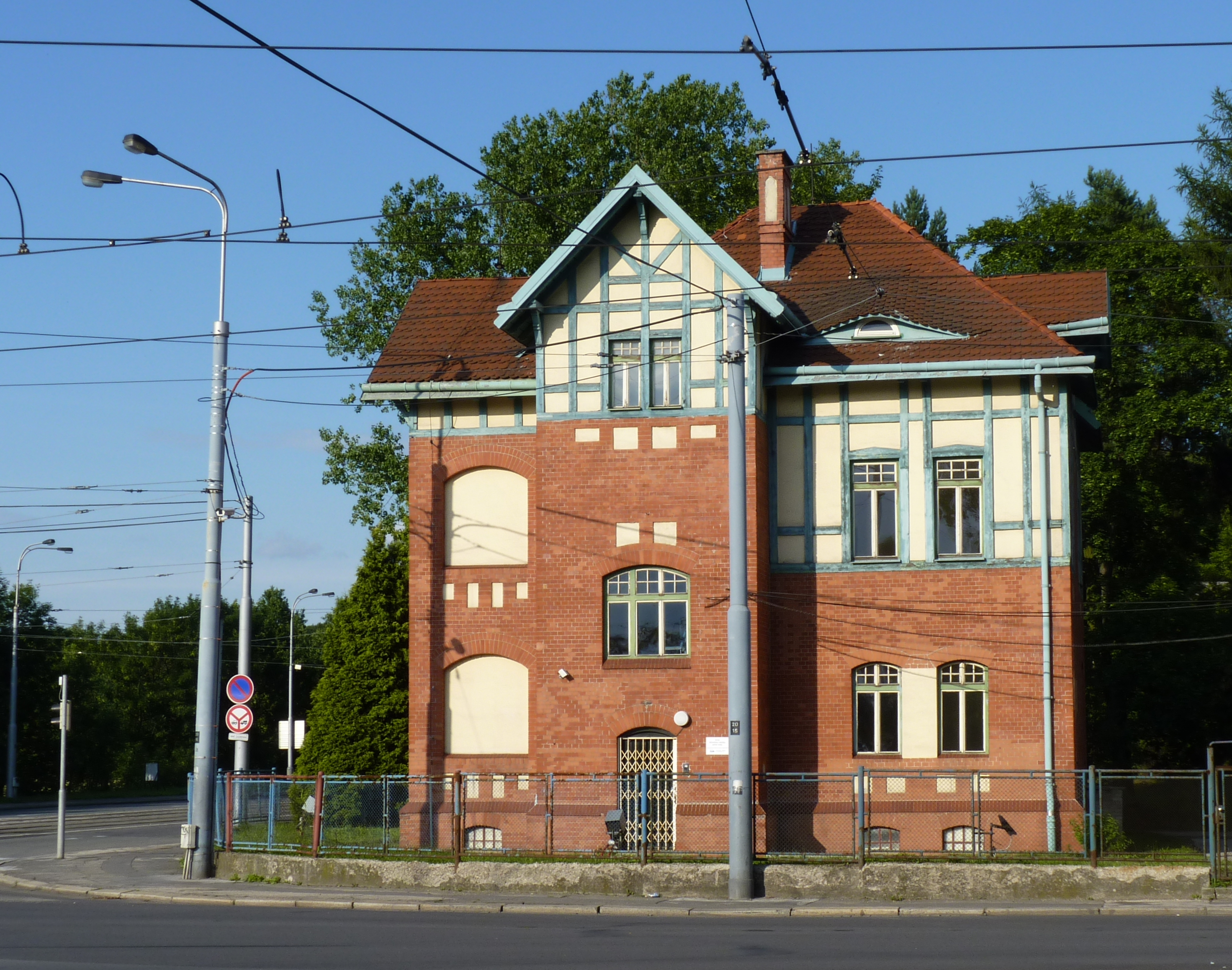
Waterworks
