= Leo Koffler =

- Born: Leon Bernhard Koffler; June 7, 1879; Zurawno, near Lemberg, Austria-Hungary
- Died: February 16, 1931 (aged 51); Berlin, Germany
- Spouse(s): married Katharina Franziska Mohn (November 21, 1888 – 1938) December 14, 1909 in Lüdenscheid, Germany

Leo Koffler (1879—1931) (full name Leon Bernhard Koffler, also known as Oskar Koffler) was a screenwriter, actor and singer. Living and working in Berlin in the beginning of the 20th century, he was one of the pioneers of cinema.

== Life ==
Koffler was born on June 7, 1879, in Zurawno, near Lemberg, now Lviv, Ukraine, when the city was in the Austrian-Hungarian Empire. His family moved to Vienna in 1882, where he received his education. He made his Abitur and became an opera singer. In 1911 he became the director of a theatre in Colmar, Alsace which was then in the German Empire (now in France).

In 1914 he moved to Berlin. He sang in a number of musicals and operas including Das Dreimäderlhaus, and Hänsel and Gretel at the Theater des Westens. Koffler also played small parts in many movies.

In 1916 he was conscripted into the Austro-Hungarian K and K regiment. This was just at the point when he started to establish a reputation for himself. At the end World War I, Koffler moved back to Berlin in 1918, and started working in movies again, including work with a small Hungarian film company called Viktor Klein. It was in this period that when he wrote a number of film-scripts for Fritz Lang, including Der Herr der Liebe and Halbblut.

In his later years, his health declined and finally he could not work any more. Nevertheless, almost until the day he died he sang at the Fasanenstrasse Synagogue in Berlin.

Leo Koffler died on February 16, 1931, in Berlin.

== Works ==
- 1919 Phantome des Lebens, screenplay
- 1919 Der Herr der Liebe, screenplay
- 1919 Das Gift im Weibe, screenplay
- 1919 Halbblut, screenplay
- 1920 Die 3 weissen Teufel (Das Weltgewissen), screenplay
- 1920 New York - Paris (Spionagekonzern) part 1, screenplay
- 1920 New York - Paris (Spionagekonzern) part 2, screenplay
- 1920 Der Tiger von Sing Sing, actor
- 1920 Die entfesselte Menschheit, actor
- 1920 Der Shawl der Kaiserin Katharina II, actor
- 1921 Fortunato 1. "Der tanzende Dämon", actor
- 1921 Fortunato 3. "Der letzte Atemzug", screenplay
- 1921 Die Tochter Ahasvers: "Das flackernde Licht", screenplay, actor
- 1921 Die Tochter Ahasvers: "Höllenreigen", screenplay
- 1921/1922 The Romance of a Poor Sinner, screenplay
