= Přívoz =

Coordinates: 49°51′10″N 18°16′12″E

- Municipal part of Ostrava
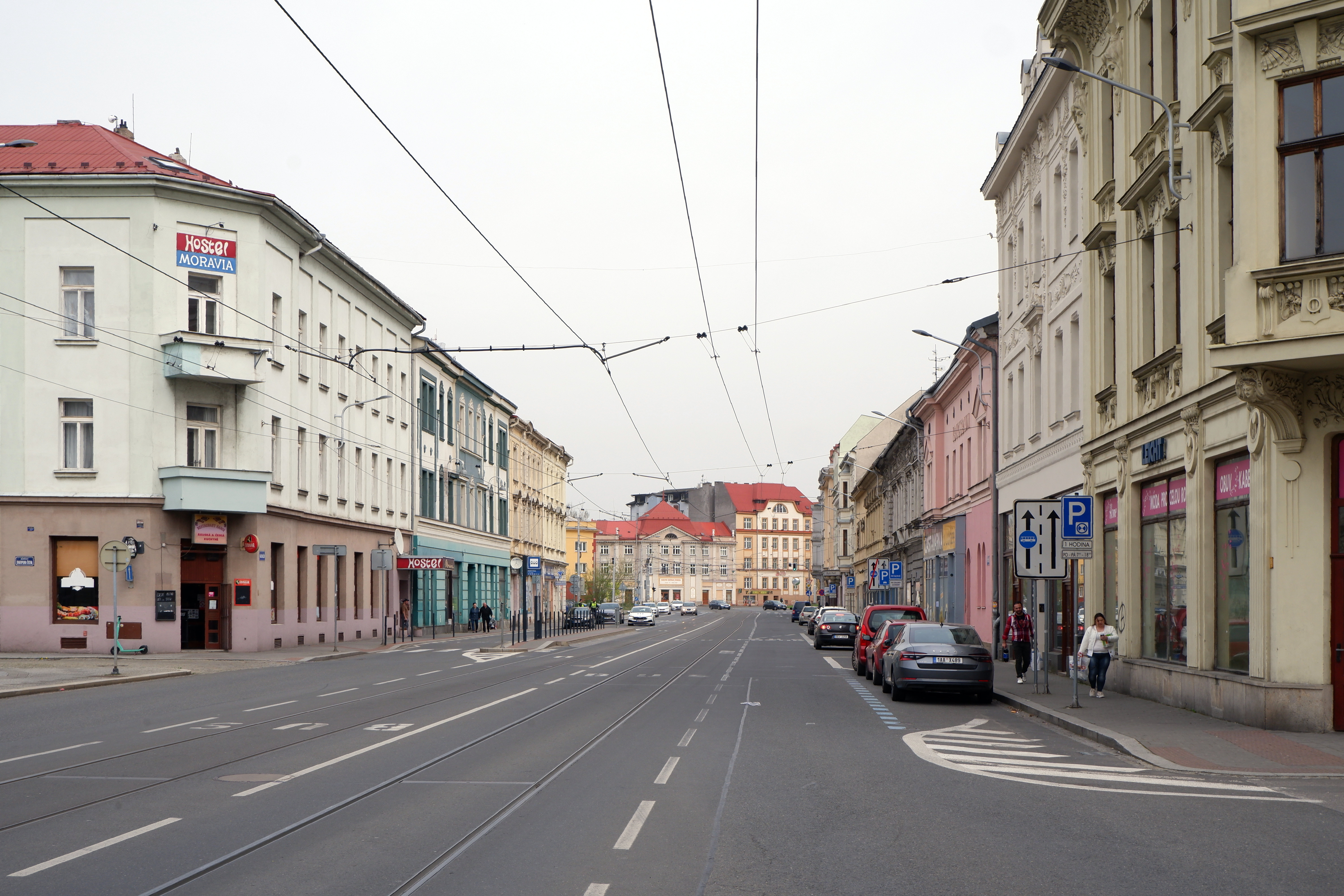
- Nádražní street
- Interactive map of Přívoz
- Country: Czech Republic
- Region: Moravian-Silesian Region
- City: Ostrava
- City district: Moravská Ostrava a Přívoz

Area
  - Total: 5.6 km^{2} (2.2 sq mi)

Population (2021)
  - Total: 3,897
  - Density: 700/km^{2} (1,800/sq mi)
- Time zone: UTC+1 (CET)
  - Summer (DST): UTC+2 (CEST)
- Postal code: 702 00

Přívoz (German: Prziwos, briefly until 1920 and 1939-1945 also Oderfurt) is a municipal part of the city of Ostrava, Moravian-Silesian Region in the Czech Republic. It lies in the Moravian part of the city, in the city district of Moravská Ostrava a Přívoz.

== History ==
Square in Přívoz designed by Camillo Sitte (including church and the town hall behind the church).

Přívoz was first mentioned in a written document in 1377 as Prsiewoz. The city plan including several momnumental buildings like the church or city hall was designed by Austrian urbanist Camillo Sitte in 1893.

Heavy industrialization that occurred in Ostrava in the second half of the 19th century also affected Přívoz. A railroad line was built there, a coke-processing plant was constructed in 1909 together with a power plant. Industrialization had an impact also on demographics, as an influx of migrant workers occurred.

Přívoz was formerly an independent municipality, in 1900 it gained town rights, in 1924 it became a part of Ostrava.

== Demographics ==
Historical population

Year	Pop.	±%
1869	2,452	—
1880	3,698	+50.8%
1890	5,250	+42.0%
1900	10,873	+107.1%
1910	16,462	+51.4%
1921	17,351	+5.4%
1930	18,544	+6.9%
1950	16,452	−11.3%

Year	Pop.	±%
1961	12,931	−21.4%
1970	8,415	−34.9%
1980	5,759	−31.6%
1991	4,280	−25.7%
2001	4,691	+9.6%
2011	4,555	−2.9%
2021	3,897	−14.4%

Source: Censuses

== Landmarks ==
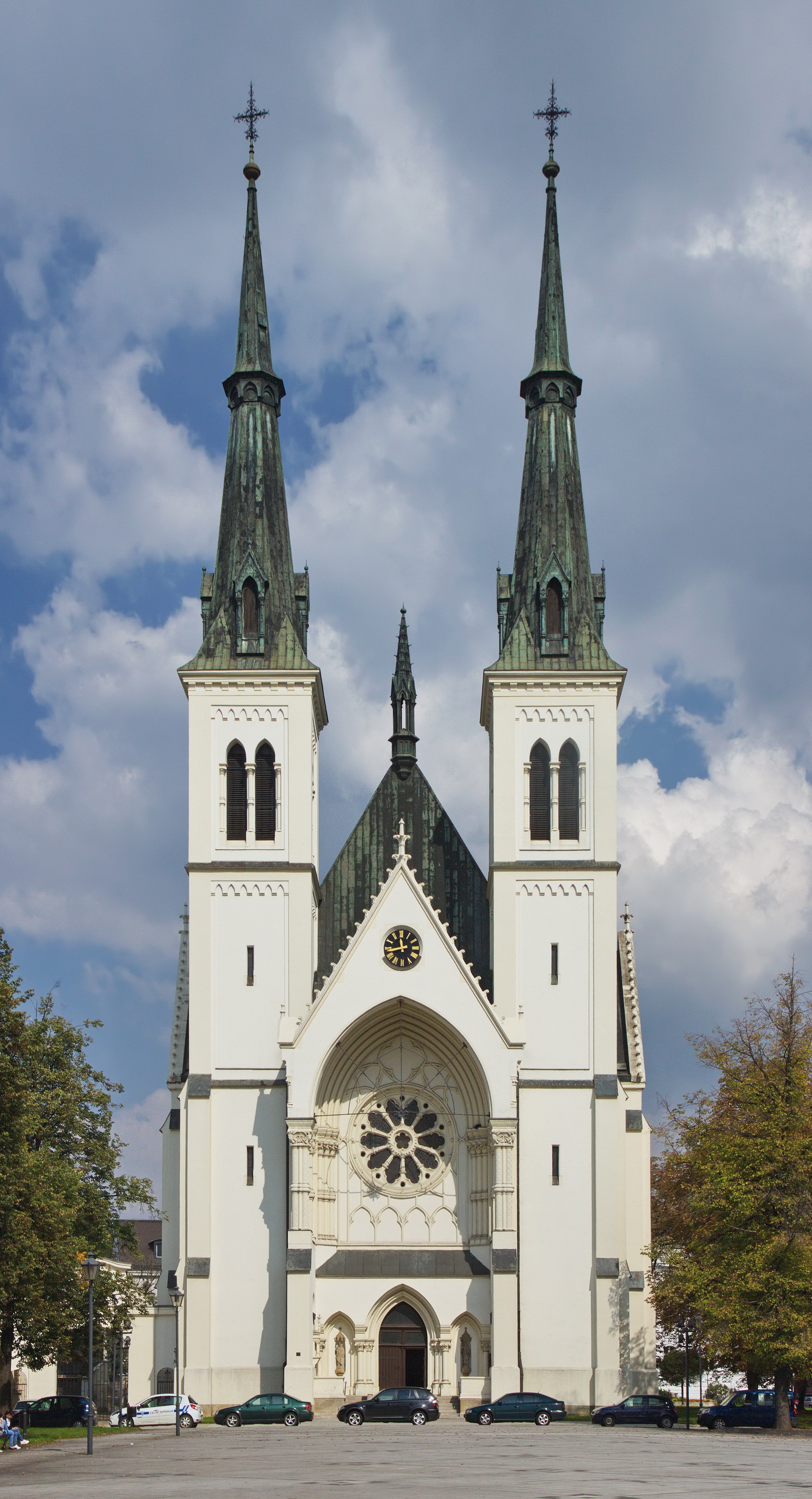
Church of the Immaculate Conception

The most important landmark in Přívoz is Immaculate Conception of Virgin Mary Church.

== Notable people ==
Polish writer Wiesław Adam Berger was born here, as was German silent film actress Gilda Langer.
