= Halbblut =

1919 film directed by Fritz Lang

- Directed by: Fritz Lang
- Screenplay by: Fritz Lang
- Produced by: Erich Pommer
- Cinematography: Carl Hoffmann
- Production company: Decla-Film-Ges. Holz & Co.
- Release date: April 3, 1919
- Country: Germany

Halbblut (lit. 'Half-blood' or 'Halfbreed') is a 1919 German silent film directed by Fritz Lang.

== Plot ==
Juanita is a beautiful woman who captures the attention of various men, but is not taken seriously because she is of mixed-race. She goes out on revenge which ends disastrously for many involved: her husband Edward gets sent to a madhouse, she seduces Edward's best friend Axel, and finally gets Axel in trouble with the police.

Axel evades arrest and Juanita flees to Mexico with the only man she is fond of who is a Mestizo. Axel arrives and shoots Juanita.

== Cast ==
- Ressel Orla as Juanita
- Carl de Vogt as Axel van der Straaten
- Carl Gerhard Schröder as Edward Scott
- Paul Morgan as Mestizo

== Production ==
Halbblut was directed and written by Fritz Lang. It was a German production by Decla-Film-Ges. Holz & Co.. The leading actors in the film were Ressel Orla and Carl de Vogt, Carl Gerhard-Schröder and Paul Morgan.

== Release and reception ==
Halbblut was released on April 3, 1919.

Writing for Der Kinematograph, Egon Jacobsohn critiqued the decision of the film to have scenes set outdoors filmed inside a film studio. He also commented on Decla's use of adding their logo to each intertitle in the silent film, as it led to inappropriate laughter when audiences read the logo outloud when reading the intertitles. A critic in Der Film found the screenplay gripping and logical in structure and praised Lang's direction as showing refined tastes and expertise but also subtle sensitivity to the tonal values that are effective.

== See also ==
- List of films made in Weimar Germany
- List of lost films
