= Senate district 15 – Pelhřimov =

Electoral district in the Czech Republic

Coordinates: 49°11′12″N 15°05′46″E

15 – Pelhřimov
- inline Senate district of the Czech Republic

- The Pelhřimov district on a map
- Senator: Ladislav Med; ODS
- Region: South Bohemian; Vysočina
- District: Pelhřimov; Jindřichův Hradec
- Electorate: 108392
- Area: 2,586.97 km²
- Last election: 2026
- Next election: 2032

Senate district 15 – Pelhřimov is an electoral district of the Senate of the Czech Republic, containing whole of the Pelhřimov District as well as parts of Jindřichův Hradec District including the city of Jindřichův Hradec. From 2026, Ladislav Med from ODS is the Senator for the district.

== Senators ==
Year	Senator	Party
1996	Milan Štěch	ČSSD
2002	Milan Štěch	ČSSD
2008	Milan Štěch	ČSSD
2014	Milan Štěch	ČSSD
2020	Jaroslav Chalupský	Svobodní
2026	Ladislav Med	ODS

== Election results ==
1996 Czech Senate election in Pelhřimov
Candidate	Party	1st round		2nd round	
Candidate	Party	Votes	%	Votes	%
Milan Štěch	ČSSD	9 071	25,11	19 142	52,41
Jan Litomiský	ODS	12 219	33,83	17 385	47,59
Václav Štěpán	KSČM	5 771	15,98	—	—
Miloslav Paulík	ODA	4 287	11,87	—	—
Petr Kesl	KDU-ČSL	4 267	11,81	—	—
Petr Koch	SZ	509	1,41	—	—

=== 2002 ===
2002 Czech Senate election in Pelhřimov
Candidate	Party	1st round		2nd round	
Candidate	Party	Votes	%	Votes	%
Milan Štěch	ČSSD	8 622	37,10	20 427	60,16
Jan Litomiský	ODS	6 269	26,97	13 526	39,83
Jaroslav Holík	US-DEU	4 291	18,46	—	—
Ing. Václav Štěpán	KSČM	4 054	17,44	—	—

=== 2008 ===
2008 Czech Senate election in Pelhřimov
Candidate	Party	1st round		2nd round	
Candidate	Party	Votes	%	Votes	%
Milan Štěch	ČSSD	18 588	43,12	21 972	60,26
Stanislav Bernard	ODS	13 645	31,65	14 485	39,73
Jaroslav Maxmilián Kašparů	KDU-ČSL	4 565	10,95	—	—
Jan Zedníček	KSČM	4 452	10,32	—	—
Marie Paukejová	SDŽ	604	1,40	—	—
Tomáš Hamet	ND	592	1.37	—	—
Zdeněk Guži	SZ	341	0,79	—	—
Václav Urbánek	US-DEU, SOS	319	0,74	—	—

=== 2014 ===
2014 Czech Senate election in Pelhřimov
Candidate	Party	1st round		2nd round	
Candidate	Party	Votes	%	Votes	%
Milan Štěch	ČSSD	16 730	36,29	13 269	61,70
Ivo Jahelka	TOP 09, STAN	8 023	17,40	8 234	38,29
Josef Fučík	ANO 2011	6 383	13,84	—	—
Tomáš Křišťan	KDU-ČSL	3 723	8,07	—	—
Josef Doubek	ODS	3 603	7,81	—	—
Radek Nejezchleb	KSČM	3 530	7,65	—	—
Zdeňka Bečková	STO	1 573	3,41	—	—
Miroslav Lidinský	O.K. party	1 301	2,82	—	—
Lubomír Havránek	Svobodní	648	1,40	—	—
Stanislav Kovář	SZ	583	1,26	—	—

=== 2020 ===
2020 Czech Senate election in Pelhřimov
Candidate	Party	1st round		2nd round	
Candidate	Party	Votes	%	Votes	%
Jaroslav Chalupský	Svobodní	8 731	23,54	8 433	52,43
Milan Štěch	ČSSD	11 581	31,22	7 649	47,56
Stanislav Mrvka	Z 2020	7 056	19,02	—	—
Vítězslav Jandák	ANO 2011	4 486	12,09	—	—
Pavel Hodáč	KSČM	2 673	7,20	—	—
Lubomír Pána	SPD	2 561	6,90	—	—

=== 2026 ===
2026 Czech Senate election in Pelhřimov
Candidate	Party	1st round		2nd round	
Candidate	Party	Votes	%	Votes	%
Ladislav Med	ODS, KDU-ČSL, TOP 09, STAN, STO	14 321	30,48	15 383	61,84
Michal Kozár	ANO 2011	12 758	27,15	9 490	38,15
Jaroslav Chalupský	HSR	11 799	25,11	—	—
Karolína Kubisková	VÝZVA	4 066	8,65	—	—
Lucie Pavlů Řádová	SPD	2 676	5,69	—	—
Pavel Hodáč	KSČM	1 356	2,88	—	—
