= Opinion polling for the 2017 Czech parliamentary election =

Opinion polling for the 2017 Czech parliamentary election started immediately after the 2013 parliamentary election. Monthly party ratings are conducted by Sanep, TNS Aisa, STEM and CVVM.

== Graphical summary ==
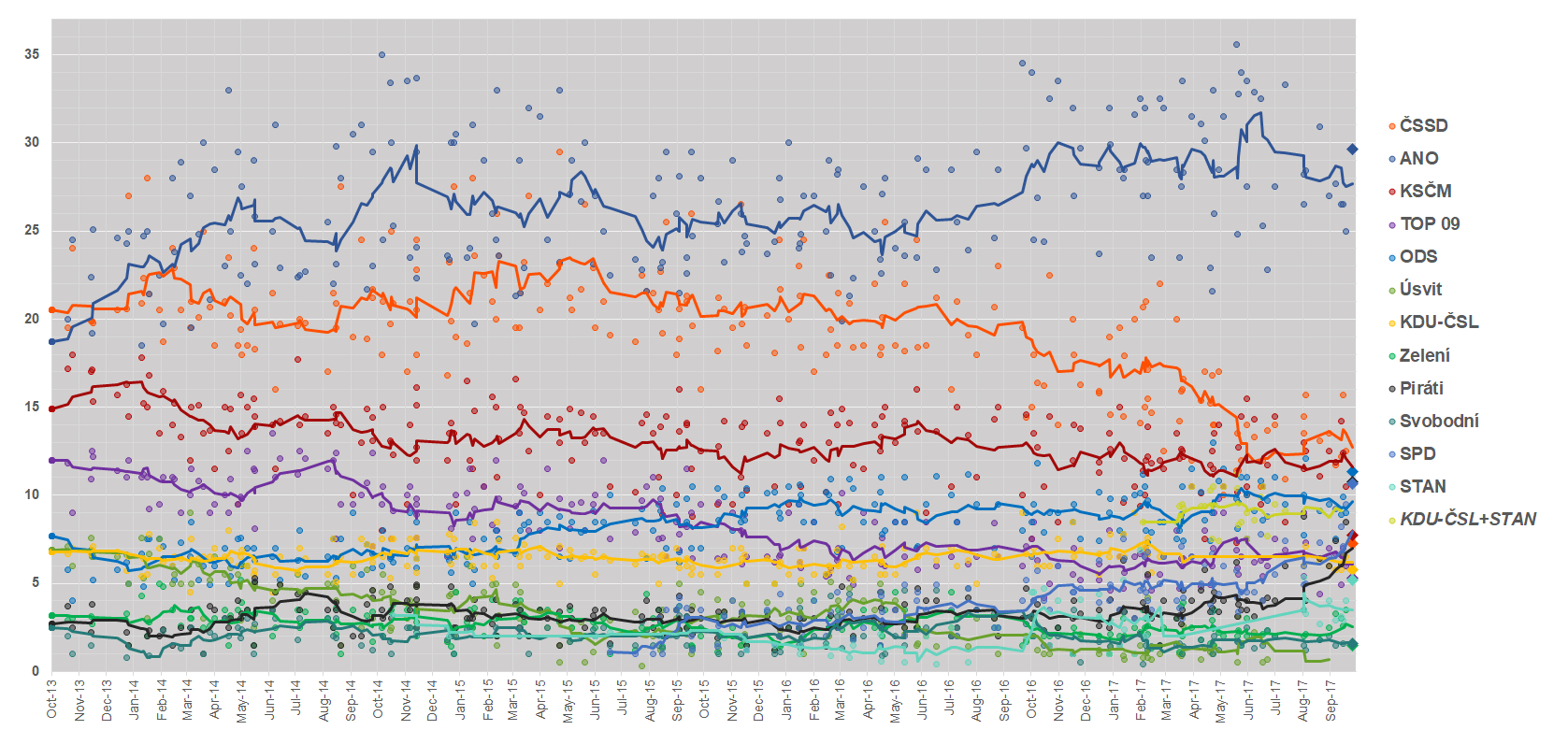
8 Poll average trend line of poll results from October 2013 to June 2017, with each line and dots corresponding to a political party.

== Percentage ==
Poll results are listed in the tables below in reverse chronological order, showing the most recent first. The highest percentage figure in each polling survey is displayed in bold, and the background shaded in the leading party's colour. In case of a tie, then no figure is shaded. Poll results use the date the survey's fieldwork was done, as opposed to the date of publication. However, if this date is unknown, the date of publication will be given instead.

There was an electoral threshold of 5% for political parties, and 10% for party alliances. In 2017 KDU-ČSL and STAN formed a political alliance, meaning they needed 10% to reach the threshold. They later disbanded this coalition.

=== Aggregate polls ===
Aggregate polling made by kdovyhrajevolby.cz website.

Date	Polling Firm	ČSSD	ANO	KSČM	TOP 09	ODS	ÚSVIT	KDU-ČSL	STAN	ZELENÍ	PIRÁTI	SVOBODNÍ	SPD	REAL	Lead
20 - 21 Oct	2017 parliamentary election	7.3 15 seats	29.6 78 seats	7.8 15 seats	5.3 7 seats	11.3 25 seats	0.0 0	5.8 10 seats	5.2 6 seats	1.5 0	10.8 22 seats	1.6 0	10.6 22 seats	0.7 0	18.3 53 seats
16 Oct 2017	kdovyhrajevolby.cz	12.34; 29 seats	25.32; 67 seats	11.41; 27 seats	6.18; 11 seats	9.20; 20 seats	—	5.75; 10 seats	3.96; 0	3.10; 0	7.64; 17 seats	2.09; 0	9.02; 20 seats	0.95; 0	13.05; 36 seats
15 Oct 2017	kdovyhrajevolby.cz	13.25; 32 seats	26.21; 68 seats	11.56; 26 seats	6.51; 12 seats	9.25; 20 seats	—	5.27; 9 seats	3.70; 0	3.09; 0	7.04; 15 seats	2.25; 0	8.49; 18 seats	0.98; 0	13.04; 35 seats
13 Oct 2017	kdovyhrajevolby.cz	13.10; 32 seats	26.23; 68 seats	11.41; 26 seats	6.47; 13 seats	8.63; 18 seats	—	5.03; 10 seats	3.82; 0	3.08; 0	7.02; 15 seats	2.25; 0	8.33; 18 seats	1.04; 0	13.13; 36 seats
11 Oct 2017	kdovyhrajevolby.cz	12.90; 31 seats	26.55; 68 seats	11.57; 26 seats	6.73; 13 seats	8.89; 19 seats	—	5.05; 10 seats	3.66; 0	3.07; 0	7.08; 15 seats	2.43; 0	8.29; 18 seats	1.09; 0	13.65; 37 seats
3 Oct 2017	kdovyhrajevolby.cz	13.91; 33 seats	25.99; 69 seats	11.62; 26 seats	7.13; 15 seats	9.15; 20 seats	—	5.4; 11 seats	3.68; 0	2.67; 0	6.57; 10 seats	2.4; 0	7.58; 16 seats	1.2; 0	12.08; 36 seats
15 Sep 2017	kdovyhrajevolby.cz	13.81	25.89	11.68	7.49	10.93	—	6.24	3.35	2.13	5.56	1.88	6.63	1.61	12.08
1 Sep 2017	kdovyhrajevolby.cz	13.02	26.82	12.10	7.54	10.59	—	6.59	2.03	2.00	4.51	2.08	6.57	1.55	13.80
25-26 Oct 2013	Election Results	20.5; 50 seats	18.7; 47 seats	14.9; 33 seats	12.0; 26 seats	7.7; 16 seats	6.9; 14 seats	6.8; 14 seats	—	3.2; 0	2.7; 0	2.5; 0	—	—	1.8; 3 seats

=== Election Potential ===
Date	Polling Firm	ČSSD	ANO	KSČM	TOP 09	ODS	ÚSVIT	KDU-ČSL	STAN	ZELENÍ	PIRÁTI	SVOBODNÍ	SPD	REAL	Others	Turnout	Lead
26 Sep - 14 Oct	Median	16.5	**32.5**	13.0	12.5	15.0	—	10.5	12.0	7.0	14.0	—	14.5	—	—	64.0	16.0
3 - 10 Oct	Focus	8.0 - 21.0	**13.0 - 29.0**	7.0 - 14.0	7.0 - 17.0	5.0 - 15.0	—	4.0 - 12.0	2.0 - 16.0	2.0 - 11.0	5.0 - 15.0	—	5.0 - 16.0	—	—	64.0	8.0
28 Sep - 4 Oct	Sanep	7.2 - 18.1	**15.1 - 26.3**	8.0 - 14.1	3.2 - 8.7	6.5 - 14.6	—	4.2 - 8.9	2.4 - 7.9	2.1 - 7.1	3.0 - 10.3	1.0 - 3.6	6.5 - 14.6	3.5 - 7.0		61.8	
7 - 13 Sep	Sanep	10.2 - 18.7	**16.9 - 28.1**	9.9 - 14.8	4.2 - 9.4	6.5 - 14.3	—	5.1 - 9.8	2.3 - 6.8	1.2 - 6.8	2.9 - 8.4	1.1 - 3.7	5.6 - 13.8	3.5 - 6.9		57.1	
13 Aug - 9 Sep	Phoenix Research	10.5 - 13.9	**23.0 - 28.2**	10.6 - 12.9	4.1 - 5.9	8.3 - 10.9	—	5.0 - 5.7	4.4 - 6.2	2.0 - 3.6	4.3 - 5.9	1.3 - 2.8	3.8 - 5.3	2.4 - 5.5			15.7
17 Aug - 23 Aug	Sanep	9.8 - 18.1	**17.1 - 28.2**	9.8 - 14.2	4.3 - 8.3	6.2 - 12.2	0.1 - 1.1	5.2 - 9.7	1.3 - 4.6	0.5 - 3.8	2.6 - 6.0	1.2 - 3.1	5.2 - 12.5	3.5 - 6.9	—	58.6	10.1
13 - 18 Jul	Sanep	9.6 - 17.8	**17.5 - 28.1**	9.7 - 13.6	4.2 - 7.8	6.5 - 12.8	0.1 - 1.2	5.3 - 10.1		0.5 - 4.0	2.5 - 5.9	1.3 - 3-2	5.2 - 12.4	4.3 - 7.1		58.6	10.3
11–17 May	Sanep	13.1 - 20.4	**15.3 - 27.8**	10.2 - 14.8	4.2 - 7.8	6.7 - 11.3	0.5 - 1.4	4.5 - 10.4		1.5 - 4.3	1.8 - 5.3	1.5 - 4.3	4.2 - 9.2	1.2 - 5.1		57.4	7.4
25-26 Oct 2013	Election Results	20.5; 50 seats	18.7; 47 seats	14.9; 33 seats	12.0; 26 seats	7.7; 16 seats	6.9; 14 seats	6.8; 14 seats	—	3.2; 0	2.7; 0	2.5; 0	—	—	2.6	59.5	1.8; 3 seats

=== Individual polls ===
Date	Polling Firm	ČSSD	ANO	KSČM	TOP 09	ODS	ÚSVIT	KDU-ČSL	STAN	ZELENÍ	PIRÁTI	SVOBODNÍ	SPD	REAL	Others	Turnout	Lead
20 - 21 Oct	2017 parliamentary election	7.3	29.6	7.8	5.3	11.3	0.0	5.8	5.2	1.5	10.8	1.6	10.6	0.7		60.8	18.3
Exit poll	Median	7.3	**29.6**	8.1	4.2	11.0	—	6.0	6.8	1.6	10.3	—	10.5	—	4.7		18.6
Exit poll	STEM	9-10	**26-27**	12-13	5-6	8-9	—	5-6	<5	<5	8-9	—	12-13	—			13-15
26 Sep - 14 Oct	Median	12.5	**25.0**	10.5	6.0	9.0	—	6.5	4.0	3.5	8.5	1.25	9.5	1.25	2.5	64.0	12.5
3 - 10 Oct	Focus	15.7	**26.5**	12.4	7.0	9.9	—	6.2	2.9	2.6	6.6	1.6	7.1	0.9	0.7	64.0	10.8
8 Oct	STEM/MARK	12.2	**26.5**	14.2	4.9	8.9	—	5.8	3.1	3.0	6.1	—	8.2	—	7.1	59.0	12.3
3 - 10 Oct	Focus	15.7	**26.5**	12.4	7.0	9.9	—	6.2	2.9	2.6	6.6	1.6	7.1	0.9	0.7	64.0	10.8
3 Oct - 7 Oct	Médea Research	9.8	**25.1**	14.4	6.0	6.6	—	6.8	4.8	2.2	9.3	1.5	10.5	—		59.7	10.7
28 Aug - 25 Sep	Median	13.5	**27.0**	12.5	7.0	9.5	—	6.0	4.0	2.5	6.0	2.0	6.5	1.25	2.25	62.0	13.5
4 - 14 Sep	CVVM	13.1	**30.9**	11.1	4.4	9.1	—	6.2	2.7	1.8	6.4	1.8	7.3	—	5.2	60.0	17.8
15 - 30 Aug	Focus	15.7	**28.4**	12.5	7.3	12.1	—	7.1	3.3	2.1	4.0	1.2	5.0	—	1.3	63.0	12.7
18 Aug - 27 Aug	Médea Research	13.54	**28.2**	11.52	5.4	7.72	—	6.03	5.35	—	8.79	—	<5.00	—			14.66
26 Jul - 27 Aug	Median	14.5	**26.5**	13.0	9.0	10.0	—	6.5	3.5	2.0	3.5	1.5	6.0	1.5	2.5	64.0	12.0
7 Aug	Médea Research	10.9	**33.3**	8.5	6.9	9.5	—	9.1		—	6.0	—	7.4	—			22.4
26 Jun - 26 Jul	Median	14.0	**27.5**	14.5	7.5	11.0	—	9.5		2.0	4.0	2.0	5.5	1.0	1.5	59.0	13.0
1 - 12 Jul	Phoenix Research	12.0	**25.3**	10.5	5.4	8.6	0.5	10.5		2.1	4.0	1.5	4.0	3.5	12.1	54.6	13.3
10 July	Médea Research	10.5	**32.5**	9.5	6.3	10.8	—	9.9		—	—	—	7.8	—			21.7
21 Jun - 3 Jul	STEM	13.3	**32.9**	14.3	6.2	9.1	2.2	6.7	1.9	2.0	3.1	1.3	4.5	—	2.5	56.0	19.6
21 Jun - 2 Jul	Focus	16.3	**29.3**	11.8	7.2	10.9	—	7.6		3.5	5.2	1.3	5.7	0.2	1.1	62.0	13.0
5 - 25 Jun	TNS Kantar	10.0	**33.5**	10.5	7.5	11.0	—	7.5		2.0	4.0	—	7.5	—	6.5		22.5
1 - 14 Jun	Phoenix Research	13.5	**24.8**	10.2	5.9	8.1	0.5	10.4		2.0	3.1	1.7	4.2	2.9	12.7	55.1	11.3
20 May - 25 Jun	Median	14.0	**27.5**	15.5	7.5	10.0	1.0	9.0		3.0	3.5	2.5	4.5	1.0	2.0	58.0	13.5
5 - 18 Jun	CVVM	12.0	**34.0**	14.5	6.5	11.0	—	7.5	1.0	1.5	3.5	1.5	4.5	—	2.5	60.0	19.5
5 - 15 Jun	STEM	11.4	**32.8**	12.7	5.5	9.6	3.1	7.4	0.9	2.3	3.8	1.7	3.4	—	4.4	56.0	20.1
13 Jun	Médea Research	11.4	**35.6**	7.3	6.9	9.8	—	11.2		—	6.2	—	5.7	—			24.2
9–29 May	TNS Kantar	10.0	**31.5**	10.5	9.0	11.5	—	8.5	2.0	2.0	4.0	—	6.0	—	5.0		20.0
11–24 May	Focus	17.0	**28.5**	14.0	9.8	10.8	—	7.4		2.2	3.4	1.2	4.4	0.7	0.5		11.5
8–18 May	CVVM	14.0	**33.0**	11.5	7.0	13.0	—	8.5	2.0	1.5	4.0	1.0	2.5	—	2.0	56.0	19.0
4–19 May	Median	14.0	**26.0**	13.5	9.0	9.5	1.5	7.0	2.5	3.5	4.5	2.0	5.0	—	2.0	—	12.0
1–15 May	Phoenix Research	15.2	**22.9**	11.7	4.9	7.4	1.1	10.3		1.6	3.4	1.3	3.8	2.8	13.6	—	7.7
9 May	Médea Research	17.0	**30.1**	7.5	8.0	8.6	1.3	9.4		—	5.8	—	6.1	—	6.2	—	13.1
3–4 May	STEM/MARK	15.4	**31.1**	10.1	4.8	10.2	0.7	9.4		1.8	4.6	1.8	5.0	—	4.8	82.2	15.7
1 - 24 Apr	Kantar TNS	12.0	**31.5**	10.5	6.5	11.5	—	7.0	3.5	2.5	4.0	—	6.5	—	4.5	—	19.5
6 - 14 Apr	STEM	16.6	**28.3**	12.2	6.4	7.4	2.6	7.1	2.2	3.9	4.6	1.4	4.2	—	3.1	54.0	11.7
3 - 13 Apr	CVVM	16.0	**33.5**	12.5	6.0	10.5	1.0	7.5	2.0	2.0	3.5	1.0	3.0	—	1.5	59.0	17.5
6 - 12 Apr	Sanep	15.9	**27.5**	12.6	6.4	8.9	0.9	8.4		3.7	2.7	—	7.1	—	5.9	56.2	11.6
1 - 10 Apr	Phoenix Research	14.2	**23.5**	12.1	4.7	8.0	1.0	9.4		1.1	3.2	1.6	3.6	2.6	15.0	—	9.3
6 Mar - 7 Apr	Median	20.0	**28.5**	13.5	8.0	7.5	—	6.5	2.0	3.0	3.0	1.5	4.0	—	3.0	59.0	8.5
3 - 24 Mar	Kantar TNS	12.5	**32.0**	11.5	6.5	8.5	—	6.5	4.0	2.5	4.0	—	6.5	—	5.5	—	19.5
6 - 19 Mar	CVVM	22.0	**32.5**	12.0	5.5	8.5	1.0	6.5	1.0	1.5	1.5	—	5.0	—	3.0	59.0	10.5
1 - 10 Mar	Phoenix Research	14.7	**23.5**	11.8	4.6	7.9	0.7	5.6	5.0	1.3	3.0	1.4	3.5	2.3	14.7	—	8.8
2 - 6 Mar	Sanep	17.1	**28.9**	12.2	5.4	9.7	0.2	6.7	2.1	2.1	3.4	—	6.8	—	5.4	53.6	11.8
27 Feb - 6 Mar	STEM	15.5	**27.0**	13.9	6.7	7.3	4.2	7.6	2.2	2.6	5.5	1.2	4.0	—	2.3	57.0	11.5
22 - 28 Feb	Focus	20.7	**27.0**	11.4	6.8	11.2	0.8	8.5		3.5	3.9	0.4	4.7	1.0	0.2	89.9	6.3
3 Feb - 4 Mar	Median	21.0	**29.0**	12.0	7.0	8.0	—	7.0	2.0	3.0	2.0	1.5	4.5	—	3.0	57.0	8.0
4 Feb - 3 Mar	Kantar TNS	15.0	**32.0**	10.0	6.5	10.5	—	7.0	2.0	2.5	3.5	—	6.5	—	4.5	69.0	17.0
11 - 25 Feb	Médea Research	14.1	**32.5**	9.4	6.7	10.1	1.5	7.1	6.9	2.2	2.1	2.1	4.6	0.7	0.7	—	18.4
6 - 19 Feb	CVVM	20.0	**31.5**	10.5	6.5	10.0	1.0	9.0	1.0	2.5	3.0	—	3.0	—	2.0	59.0	11.5
2 - 8 Feb	Sanep	17.9	**28.5**	12.1	5.6	9.8	0.7	6.5	2.4	2.0	3.4	—	6.4	—	4.7	52.9	10.6
6 Feb	Médea Research	14.5	**28.0**	9.6	4.7	7.8	0.9	7.8	5.2	3.0	6.3	3.4	7.5	—	1.1	—	13.5
1 Jan - 2 Feb	Median	19.5	**28.5**	15.0	6.5	8.0	—	6.5	1.5	2.0	3.5	1.5	3.5	—	3.0	58.5	13.5
1 - 23 Jan	STEM	14.6	**29.9**	12.6	4.6	9.8	1.4	7.8	2.9	2.1	4.1	1.4	4.9	—	3.9	57.0	15.3
9 - 22 Jan	CVVM	19.0	**32.0**	13.5	8.0	9.0	1.0	6.5	1.0	1.0	2.5	—	4.0	—	2.5	60.0	13.0
5 - 10 Jan	Sanep	15.8	**28.6**	11.9	6.1	10.2	1.0	6.7	3.1	2.0	3.5	—	6.3	—	4.8	54.5	12.8
1 - 10 Jan	Phoenix Research	15.9	**23.7**	11.3	5.2	7.4	1.2	5.5	4.4	2.0	2.6	1.7	3.9	1.2	14.2	50.5	7.8
2017
30 Nov - 20 Dec	STEM	16.3	**29.7**	13.8	5.2	7.5	2.1	6.9	4.1	1.9	3.3	0.5	4.7	—	3.2	54.0	13.4
13 Nov - 13 Dec	Median	18.0	**27.0**	14.0	7.0	9.5	—	6.5	2.0	2.5	4.0	2.0	3.5	—	3.5	60.0	9.0
28 Nov - 12 Dec	CVVM	20.0	**32.0**	12.0	5.5	8.5	1.0	8.5	1.0	1.0	3.0	1.0	4.5	—	2.0	57.0	12.0
5 - 25 Nov	TNS Aisa	14.0	**33.5**	8.5	6.0	9.0	—	7.5	4.0	2.5	2.5	2.0	6.0	—	4.5	65.0	19.5
7 - 16 Nov	CVVM	22.5	**32.5**	14.5	5.0	9.0	1.0	6.0	1.5	2.0	1.5	—	3.5	—	1.0	56.0	10.0
1 - 10 Nov	Phoenix Research	16.2	**24.4**	10.5	4.2	7.9	1.0	6.0	4.7	2.0	2.3	1.5	4.0	—	15.3	59.5	8.2
27 Oct - 2 Nov	Sanep	16.4	**26.9**	12.7	6.3	11.8	1.2	6.0	2.6	2.6	3.8	—	5.7	—	4.0	56.8	10.5
8 - 27 Oct	TNS Aisa	15.0	**34.0**	7.5	7.5	8.5	—	6.5	4.5	2.0	3.0	—	6.5	—	5.0	65.0	19.0
29 Sep - 29 Oct	Median	18.0	**24.5**	13.5	8.5	9.5	—	7.0	2.0	3.0	4.0	2.0	4.0	—	4.0	59.0	6.5
**14 – 15 Oct**	**Senate election (2nd round)**	**13.12**	**21.71**	**1.35**	**7.27**	**10.30**	—	**18.50**	**6.0**	**2.96**	—	—	—	—	**25.06**	**9.38**	**8.59**
13 - 21 Oct	STEM	14.4	**29.7**	14.6	7.1	9.0	1.8	6.7	7.1 (+TOP 09)	1.7	4.7	2.7	5.2	—	1.6	52.1	15.1
10 - 17 Oct	CVVM	19.5	**34.5**	10.0	6.0	8.0	—	9.0	—	1.5	3.0	—	4.0	—	4.5	56.0	15.0
**7 – 8 Oct**	**Senate election (1st round)**	**14.62**	**17.18**	**9.50**	**8.02**	**11.71**	**1.82**	**8.48**	**4.9**	**2.13**	**0.83**	—	**0.68**	—	**19.61**	**33.17**	**2.56**
**7 – 8 Oct**	**Regional election**	**15.3**	**21.1**	**10.6**	**5.5 (Note: Party received 2.1% in coalition with other parties.)**	**9.5**	**0.9**	**8.0 (Note: Party received 1.7% in coalition with other parties.)**	**4.0**	**1.7 (Note: Party received 1.5% in coalition with other parties.)**	**3.7 (Note: Party received 2.0% in coalition with other parties.)**	**2.6 (Note: Party received 2.4% in coalition with other parties.)**	**5.9 (Note: Party received 5.2% in coalition with other parties.)**	—	—	**34.6**	**5.8**
5 - 19 Sep	CVVM	23.0	**28.5**	15.0	6.5	9.5	1.0	6.5	—	2.5	2.0	—	2.5	—	3.0	59.0	5.5
30 Aug - 15 Sep	STEM	20.7	**24.6**	14.3	8.4	7.0	3.0	6.7	—	2.5	3.0	3.3	2.5	—	4.0	56.0	3.9
6 - 26 Aug	TNS Aisa	18.0	**29.5**	11.0	6.5	9.5	3.0	5.0	—	3.5	3.5	—	3.5	—	7.0	69.0	11.5
11 - 17 Aug	Sanep	19.1	**23.9**	13.4	6.1	11.2	1.4	6.3	0.5	—	4.2	4.7	4.7	—	4.5	54.1	4.8
4 Jul - 4 Aug	Median	21.0	**25.5**	15.0	8.5	8.5	2.0	6.0	1.5	3.0	3.5	2.5	2.0	—	1.0	78.5	4.5
23-29 Jul	TNS Aisa	16.0	**28.5**	10.5	6.5	10.0	2.5	7.0	2.5	4.5	2.0	2.0	3.5	—	4.5		12.5
7-12 Jul	Sanep	21.2	**22.8**	13.6	6.0	11.1	1.4	6.3	0.4	—	4.0	4.6	4.9	—	3.7	53.8	1.6
27 Jun-1 Jul	TNS Aisa	18.5	**28.5**	9.0	8.5	9.5	2.0	7.0	2.0	—	4.0	2.5	3.5	—	5.0	66.0	10.0
13-21 Jun	STEM	18.4	**29.1**	13.6	5.8	7.1	1.6	6.5	5.8 (+TOP 09)	2.5	4.7	2.4	4.5	—	3.7	57.0	10.7
3–20 Jun	CVVM	**24.5**	23.5	16.0	7.0	7.0	1.5	9.0	—	2.5	2.5	—	4.0	—	2.5	59.0	1.0
2–7 Jun	SANEP	18.2	**23.6**	14.2	6.5	11.0	2.1	6.1	0.5	—	3.8	4.6	4.9	—	4.5	54.2	5.4
5 May–7 Jun	Median	22.0	**25.5**	14.0	8.5	8.5	2.5	7.0	—	3.5	2.5	1.5	2.0	—	2.5	59.5	3.5
5–27 May	TNS Aisa	18.5	**24.0**	13.0	8.5	8.5	4.0	5.5	—	4.5	3.5	2.0	3.5	—	4.0	69.8	5.5
5–11 May	SANEP	18.4	**22.6**	13.3	6.1	11.0	2.8	6.2	0.6	—	3.6	4.5	4.3	—	5.0	53.8	4.2
4–13 May	STEM	20.1	**27.1**	14.5	7.6	7.8	2.4	7.1	—	2.0	2.6	0.9	3.4	—	4.5	56.0	7.0
2–16 May	CVVM	25.5	**28.0**	15.0	6.0	8.0	—	5.5	—	3.5	2.5	1.0	2.5	—	2.5	60.0	2.5
1–10 May	Phoenix Research	18.0	**23.4**	12.5	4.5	10.2	5.0	5.5	2.1	1.4	1.5	1.5	1.5	—	3.7	55.4	5.4
5 Apr–4 May	Median	22.0	**25.0**	14.0	8.5	9.5	3.5	6.5	—	2.5	3.0	—	—	—	4.5	59.5	3.0
16–22 Apr	TNS Aisa	18.5	**27.5**	11.5	9.0	8.5	4.0	6.0	—	3.5	3.0	2.0	2.5	—	4.0	68.0	9.0
1–10 Apr	Phoenix Research	18.4	**22.3**	11.7	4.9	10.4	5.2	5.2	1.5	1.8	2.0	1.9	1.8	—	4.7	57.7	3.9
1–6 Apr	Sanep	20.9	**21.3**	14.1	5.3	10.9	4.7	6.0	0.8	—	3.4	4.4	4.1	—	4.1	51.4	0.4
19–24 Mar	TNS Aisa	21.5	**28.5**	9.5	7.0	9.0	4.0	6.0	—	3.5	2.5	—	2.5	—	6.0	71.0	7.0
17–29 Mar	ppm Factum	**20.0**	19.9	14.9	10.1	7.0	3.1	8.2	—	2.4	4.8	1.3	3.4	—	4.9	53.0	0.1
16–23 Mar	STEM	18.5	**28.2**	14.0	6.3	6.8	2.8	6.9	—	2.5	2.8	3.1	4.5	—	3.6	58.0	9.7
10–16 Mar	Sanep	19.4	**22.5**	14.7	5.9	10.9	5.1	5.7	0.9	—	3.2	4.3	3.4	—	4.0	50.9	4.1
7–14 Mar	CVVM	22.5	**29.0**	13.0	5.5	10.0	2.0	6.0	—	3.0	2.5	—	2.5	—	3.0	57.0	6.5
2–11 Mar	Phoenix Research	18.0	**25.0**	10.2	5.4	10.2	5.5	5.5	1.5	1.5	1.4	1.6	2.0	—	4.5	55.6	7.0
8–15 Feb	CVVM	24.5	**27.0**	14.0	7.0	8.5	1.0	7.0	—	3.0	3.0	—	2.0	—	3.0	61.0	2.5
1–12 Feb	Phoenix Research	18.4	**24.8**	10.5	5.9	10.0	5.0	5.2	1.6	1.6	1.4	1.4	1.6	—	4.7	52.5	6.4
4–10 Feb	SANEP	21.3	**24.3**	13.1	6.2	10.6	4.0	6.2	1.0	—	3.0	3.6	3.1	—	3.6	55.9	3.0
13 Jan–9 Feb	Median	23.0	**24.0**	13.0	9.5	9.5	2.5	7.0	—	2.5	2.5	1.5	2.5	—	1.5	61.5	1.0
23–29 Jan	TNS Aisa	20.0	**30.0**	9.5	9.0	10.5	3.0	5.5	—	2.5	2.5	—	3.5	—	4.0	68.8	10.0
11–19 Jan	STEM	21.7	**26.8**	14.1	6.6	8.7	2.3	6.2	—	1.4	2.5	1.1	4.4	—	—	60.0	5.0
11–18 Jan	CVVM	24.5	**28.0**	15.5	6.5	9.0	2.0	6.0	—	1.5	2.0	—	2.0	—	3.0	58.0	3.5
2–13 Jan	Phoenix Research	18.1	**24.4**	10.5	6.2	10.2	5.0	5.0	1.5	1.2	1.2	1.0	1.6	—	5.2	52.5	6.3
1–5 Jan	Sanep	20.2	**23.7**	13.5	6.5	10.1	3.9	6.4	1.9	—	3.1	3.4	3.5	—	3.8	54.3	3.5
2016
3–11 Dec	STEM	20.7	**24.2**	14.1	8.9	8.6	2.1	6.6	—	1.7	—	2.0	2.8	—	—	54.0	3.5
30 Nov–7 Dec	CVVM	**26.5**	26.0	11.0	8.0	8.5	1.5	7.0	—	1.5	3.0	1.0	2.0	—	3.0	58.0	0.5
30 Nov–13 Dec	Phoenix Research	18.5	**24.3**	10.3	6.5	10.4	5.0	5.0	1.2	1.3	1.5	1.2	1.2	—	4.6	52.6	5.8
3–8 Dec	Sanep	19.7	**23.8**	13.9	6.1	10.0	3.8	6.4	1.9	—	3.4	3.3	3.4	—	4.3	56.4	4.1
21–27 Nov	TNS Aisa	19.5	**29.0**	9.5	9.0	8.0	4.0	7.0	—	2.5	—	2.0	4.0	—	5.5	—	9.5
12–18 Nov	Sanep	20.6	**23.2**	14.2	6.5	9.9	3.4	6.3	1.9	—	3.4	3.2	3.1	—	4.1	53.6	2.6
2–11 Nov	STEM	21.2	**26.7**	12.8	9.6	8.6	1.3	6.3	—	3.2	3.4	1.0	2.6	—	3.3	55.0	5.5
30 Oct–10 Nov	Phoenix Research	18.2	**25.4**	9.5	6.4	10.4	4.1	5.5	1.9	1.1	1.9	1.6	1.4	—	10.7	55.8	7.2
17–23 Oct	TNS Aisa	16.0	**28.0**	12.5	9.5	7.0	4.5	5.5	—	2.0	3.0	2.5	3.5	—	4.0	68.0	12.0
5–12 Oct	CVVM	26.0	**29.5**	11.5	9.0	7.0	1.0	5.5	—	1.5	3.5	—	2.0	—	3.5	59.5	3.5
30 Sep–13 Oct	Phoenix Research	19.6	**24.7**	8.8	6.4	10.5	3.7	5.9	2.3	1.4	2.1	1.3	1.2	—	12.1	56.2	4.8
1–7 Oct	SANEP	21.3	**22.6**	14.1	8.2	9.8	2.1	6.4	1.8	—	3.1	3.1	3.6	—	3.9	53.4	1.3
6 Sep–7 Oct	MEDIAN	21.0	**23.5**	14.0	11.5	8.5	2.5	6.0	—	2.5	2.5	1.5	3.0	—	3.5	60.0	2.5
18–28 Sep	STEM	20.6	**28.1**	13.6	6.9	6.2	2.3	5.9	—	3.7	2.4	2.2	3.7	—	—	—	7.5
17–28 Sep	ppm Factum	18.9	**21.5**	16.0	7.8	6.8	5.0	6.3	—	2.9	4.3	3.2	4.2	—	3.1	48.0	2.6
19–25 Sep	TNS Aisa	18.0	**26.0**	10.0	8.5	9.5	3.0	7.0	—	3.5	3.5	2.0	3.5	—	5.5	66.0	8.0
7–14 Sep	CVVM	25.5	**29.5**	14.5	6.5	7.0	—	6.5	—	2.0	2.0	—	3.5	—	3.0	57.0	4.0
31 Aug–10 Sep	Phoenix Research	19.2	**23.2**	8.9	7.6	10.4	3.5	6.6	2.3	1.4	2.1	1.3	1.0	—	1.8	—	4.0
3–8 Sep	Sanep	22.7	**22.9**	13.9	9.8	9.1	1.2	6.5	2.0	2.8	3.1	2.8	2.0	—	1.2	52.6	0.2
24–30 Aug	TNS Aisa	20.5	**28.0**	11.0	7.5	9.5	3.0	5.0	—	3.5	3.5	—	3.0	—	5.5	—	7.5
5 Aug–5 Sep	MEDIAN	21.5	**27.0**	13.5	11.0	8.0	2.0	6.5	—	3.0	2.5	1.5	1.0	—	2.5	58.0	6.5
13-23 Aug	ppm Factum	**21.6**	**21.6**	14.6	10.5	6.4	2.4	6.5	—	4.4	4.0	2.3	—	—	8.0	59.5	**Tie**
13-18 Aug	Sanep	22.5	**22.8**	14.1	9.7	9.2	0.3	6.7	2.1	2.5	3.1	2.8	2.1	—	4.6	50.3	0.3
30 Jul–10 Aug	Phoenix Research	18.7	**23.4**	10.2	7.9	8.4	3.4	6.1	2.2	1.2	2.2	1.5	1.0	—	1.8	—	4.7
26 Jun–13 Jul	Phoenix Research	19.1	**22.5**	10.5	7.5	10.0	2.9	6.3	2.2	1.0	1.6	1.5	1.1	—	4.0	—	3.4
6 Jun–6 Jul	MEDIAN	21.0	**25.0**	13.5	12.0	8.5	3.0	6.5	—	3.0	3.5	2.5	—	—	1.5	59.5	4.0
20-26 Jun	TNS Aisa	19.5	**27.0**	13.5	10.0	8.5	—	5.5	—	2.5	3.5	2.0	2.0	—	8.0	70.3	7.5
18-24 Jun	Sanep	22.9	**23.1**	14.5	9.5	9.1	1.1	6.8	—	2.8	3.2	2.4	—	—	9.8	52.4	0.2
8-15 Jun	CVVM	26.5	**30.0**	13.0	8.0	8.0	0.5	6.5	—	2.0	2.5	—	—	—	3.5	57.0	4.5
4-11 Jun	STEM	21.7	**26.7**	14.7	9.6	7.9	2.8	6.4	—	3.2	3.3	2.0	—	—	1.8	51.0	5.0
25–31 May	TNS Aisa	20.5	**29.0**	12.0	9.5	8.5	2.5	6.5	—	2.5	3.0	—	—	—	6.5	—	8.5
19–29 May	STEM	21.2	**27.1**	14.9	8.1	6.4	1.7	6.9	—	3.5	3.7	1.7	—	—	4.8	56.0	5.9
14–18 May	Sanep	23.1	**23.2**	14.3	9.8	8.8	1.5	7.1	—	2.8	3.4	—	—	—	8.8	51.7	0.1
11–18 May	CVVM	29.5	**33.0**	13.0	7.0	6.5	0.5	5.0	—	3.0	1.5	—	—	—	1.5	57.0	3.5
7 Apr–4 May	MEDIAN	22.0	**24.5**	14.5	11.5	8.5	2.5	6.5	—	3.5	3.0	2.5	—	—	1.5	59.5	2.5
20-26 Apr	TNS Aisa	20.5	**31.5**	10.0	8.0	9.0	3.5	7.0	—	3.5	3.5	—	—	—	3.5	68.0	11.0
4-13 Apr	CVVM	27.0	**32.0**	12.5	8.0	8.5	—	6.5	—	2.0	2.0	1.0	—	—	0.5	55.0	5.0
2-8 Apr	Sanep	**23.2**	22.9	14.7	10.1	8.3	2.8	7.2	—	—	3.1	—	—	—	7.7	52.6	0.3
28 Mar–3 Apr	TNS Aisa	19.5	**29.0**	13.5	9.0	9.0	3.0	6.5	—	3.5	2.5	2.0	—	—	2.5	46.0	9.5
8 Mar–7 Apr	MEDIAN	**21.5**	**21.5**	15.0	10.5	8.0	4.5	6.0	—	4.0	3.5	2.5	—	—	3.0	56.0	**Tie**
19-29 Mar	ppm Factum	19.5	**21.3**	16.6	9.4	6.7	4.9	7.6	—	4.0	3.8	—	—	—	6.2	59.5	1.8
2-9 Mar	CVVM	26.0	**33.0**	11.0	8.0	6.5	1.5	8.5	—	2.0	2.0	—	—	—	1.5	60.0	7.0
5-11 Mar	Sanep	**23.6**	**23.6**	13.2	9.8	7.5	3.2	7.4	—	—	3.1	—	—	—	8.6	52.8	**Tie**
20 Feb-3 Mar	ppm Factum	21.0	**26.0**	15.6	8.3	6.8	4.9	5.3	—	4.1	2.7	—	—	—	5.3	51.0	5.0
7 Feb-7 Mar	MEDIAN	20.0	**24.5**	15.0	12.0	8.0	5.0	6.0	—	3.0	4.1	2.5	—	—	1.5	58.0	4.5
16-22 Feb	TNS Aisa	22.5	**29.0**	10.5	10.5	7.5	4.5	6.0	—	2.0	3.5	—	—	—	4.0	69.5	6.5
5–11 Feb	Sanep	**23.6**	19.7	14.8	9.2	5.8	3.3	8.4	—	3.6	4.1	—	—	—	7.5	39.1	3.9
2–9 Feb	CVVM	28.0	**31.0**	11.5	7.5	5.0	2.5	6.0	—	2.5	3.0	—	—	—	3.0	61.0	3.0
1–3 Feb	ppm Factum	18.6	**23.5**	16.5	10.1	6.1	6.5	6.7	—	2.8	3.0	2.4	—	—	2.6	49.0	4.9
6 Jan-6 Feb	MEDIAN	21.5	**23.0**	12.0	11.5	8.5	6.0	6.5	—	3.5	3.0	2.0	—	—	2.5	56.5	2.5
18-21 Jan	TNS Aisa	19.0	**30.5**	9.5	10.0	9.0	4.5	6.5	—	4.5	2.5	2.0	—	—	2.0	64.0	11.5
12–19 Jan	CVVM	27.5	**30.0**	13.5	6.5	6.5	2.0	7.5	—	1.0	2.5	1.0	—	—	2.0	56.0	2.5
6–16 Jan	STEM	19.9	**30.0**	14.1	8.1	5.6	4.4	6.1	—	1.4	4.8	2.0	—	—	3.6	58.0	10.1
8–14 Jan	Sanep	23.2	**23.4**	13.5	9.4	6.3	4.3	7.8	2.0	—	3.7	—	—	—	6.4	53.9	0.2
12 Dec–12 Jan	Phoenix Research	16.8	**23.6**	12.0	6.5	6.6	1.7	6.8	2.5	1.7	2.5	1.8	—	—	5.6	—	6.8
2015
1–9 Dec	ppm Factum	20.5	**22.3**	16.1	9.8	7.0	4.8	6.4	—	3.4	4.9	2.5	—	—	1.8	49.0	1.8
4–8 Dec	Sanep	22.8	**24.1**	12.7	8.9	6.4	3.8	7.6	2.1	3.5	4.1	—	—	—	4.0	51.3	1.3
1–8 Dec	CVVM	24.5	**29.5**	12.0	9.5	8.5	2.5	7.0	—	2.0	2.5	—	—	—	2.0	57.0	5.0
29 Nov–08 Dec	STEM	18.0	**33.7**	15.1	7.6	5.9	3.3	5.6	—	2.8	4.8	2.2	—	—	1.0	55.0	15.7
1 Nov–1 Dec	MEDIAN	21.0	**23.5**	14.0	10.5	9.0	4.0	7.5	—	2.5	3.5	2.5	—	—	2.0	56.0	2.5
22-28 Nov	TNS Aisa	17.0	**33.5**	9.5	10.0	7.0	3.0	6.0	—	3.5	4.0	2.5	—	—	4.0	55.0	16.5
6–12 Nov	Sanep	20.9	**25.3**	12.3	9.1	6.2	4.5	7.5	3.2	3.8	3.9	—	—	—	3.3	50.3	4.4
3–10 Nov	CVVM	25.0	**30.0**	13.0	7.5	6.5	2.5	7.5	—	3.5	3.0	1.0	—	—	0.5	57.0	5.0
31 Oct–09 Nov	STEM	19.7	**33.4**	13.1	6.5	6.4	2.3	5.3	—	3.4	4.8	1.7	—	—	3.4	57.0	13.7
1 Oct–1 Nov	MEDIAN	21.0	**24.5**	15.0	10.5	8.0	5.5	6.5	—	2.0	3.0	2.0	—	—	2.0	55.5	3.5
25–31 Oct	TNS Aisa	18.0	**35.0**	8.0	9.5	6.0	4.5	7.5	—	2.5	3.5	—	—	—	5.5	64.0	17.0
16–20 Oct	Sanep	21.2	**23.0**	13.1	12.4	6.7	4.6	7.1	3.2	3.4	4.2	—	—	—	4.3	49.5	1.8
13–20 Oct	STEM	21.7	**29.5**	14.4	7.1	5.9	3.0	6.2	—	1.7	4.6	1.2	—	—	4.7	59.0	7.8
**17–18 Oct**	**Senate election (2nd round)**	**34.95**	**15.14**	–	**6.43**	**9.34 (Note: Candidate of ODS in coalition with KČ received another 1.87 % and got elected.)**	–	**16.27 (Note: Three candidates of KDU-ČSL+SZ received another 6.93 % votes, all of them got elected.)**	**2.3**	**– (Note: Three candidates of KDU-ČSL+SZ received another 6.93 % votes, all of them got elected.)**	**– (Note: Supported two candidates of KDU-ČSL+SZ, both of them got elected.)**	–	—	—	**15.34**	**16.69**	**18.68**
3–14 Oct	ppm Factum	18.9	**21.7**	14.9	10.7	7.2	5.8	7.2	—	3.2	3.8	2.8	—	—	2.9	49.0	2.8
**10–11 Oct**	**Senate election (1st round)**	**22.04**	**17.55**	**9.74**	**8.49**	**10.76 (Note: Candidate of ODS in coalition with KČ received another 0.76 % and got to 2nd round.)**	**1.30 (Note: Candidate of Dawn in coalition with Hora 2014 received another 0.23 %.)**	**8.21 (Note: Candidates of KDU-ČSL in coalitions with SZ and local movements received another 4.70 % votes. Three coalition candidates got to 2nd round.)**	**1.5**	**0.65 (Note: Candidates of SZ in coalitions with KDU-ČSL and local movements received another 3.95 % plus 0.41 % in coalition with Pirates. Three coalition candidates got to 2nd round.)**	**0.53 (Note: Candidate of Pirates in coalition with SZ received another 0.41 %. The party supported several candidates of SZ+KDU-ČSL, two of them got to 2nd round.)**	**1.41**	—	—	**17.17**	**37.87**	**4.49**
**10–11 Oct**	**Municipal election**	**12.65**	**14.59**	**7.80**	**8.40 (Note: TOP 09 also received 0.57 % statewide in coalitions with independent candidates.)**	**9.01**	**0.65**	**4.91 (Note: KDU-ČSL also participated in numerous local coalitions. Notably in Prague with SZ and STAN where it received 11.22 % (2.40 % statewide) and 8 mandates. It also received 0.56 % statewide in coalitions with independent candidates.)**	**3.0**	**1.16 (Note: SZ also participated in numerous local coalitions. Notably in Prague with KDU-ČSL and STAN where it received 11.22 % (2.40 % statewide) and 8 mandates. It also received 0.57 % statewide in coalitions with independent candidates.)**	**1.33 (Note: Pirates also participated in numerous local coalitions. Notably in Brno with movement Žít Brno, where it received 11.89 % (0.71 % statewide) and 7 mandates.)**	**1.84**	—	—	**37.5**	**44.46**	**1.96**
1–8 Oct	CVVM	24.5	**31.0**	13.0	10.0	5.5	2.5	7.5	—	—	2.0	1.5	—	—	2.5	62.0	6.5
22-28 Sep	TNS Aisa	19.0	**30.5**	10.0	9.5	9.0	6.0	5.5	—	3.5	2.0	2.0	—	—	3.0	64.0	11.5
8–15 Sep	CVVM	27.5	**28.0**	14.0	9.5	7.5	1.5	6.5	—	1.0	1.5	—	—	—	3.0	58.0	0.5
4–10 Sep	Sanep	19.5	**23.1**	14.6	12.4	5.3	4.8	6.2	—	3.6	3.9	3.0	—	—	3.6	55.1	3.6
3–10 Sep	STEM	20.9	**29.8**	14.1	7.5	6.4	4.0	5.1	—	2.1	3.5	1.9	—	—	4.7	59.0	8.9
6 Aug–6 Sep	MEDIAN	21.5	**22.0**	15.0	12.0	7.5	5.0	7.5	—	2.5	2.5	2.0	—	—	2.5	57.5	0.5
25-31 Aug	TNS Aisa	17.0	**25.5**	13.5	11.5	6.5	5.0	5.5	—	3.0	3.5	3.0	—	—	6.0	63.0	8.5
1–6 Aug	Sanep	19.8	**22.7**	14.5	12.1	5.4	4.5	6.4	—	3.4	4.5	—	—	—	6.7	54.3	2.9
3–31 Jul	MEDIAN	20.0	**22.5**	14.0	12.5	8.0	5.5	7.0	—	2.5	3.5	3.0	—	—	1.5	58.5	2.5
21–29 Jul	ppm Factum	19.6	**22.4**	17.7	11.2	6.3	4.9	5.6	—	3.5	4.4	1.8	—	—	1.7	49.0	2.8
3–9 Jul	Sanep	19.7	**22.9**	14.2	12.1	5.2	4.7	6.5	—	3.2	4.9	—	—	—	6.6	55.9	3.2
28 Jun-4 Jul	TNS Aisa	16.0	**31.0**	11.5	11.0	7.0	4.5	5.5	—	2.5	4.5	3.0	—	—	3.5	66.6	15.0
3–30 Jun	MEDIAN	21.5	**25.0**	14.0	13.5	6.5	4.0	4.5	—	2.0	3.5	3.5	—	—	2.0	55.0	4.5
5–10 Jun	Sanep	20.5	**23.1**	14.5	11.4	5.1	4.8	6.4	—	3.3	5.1	—	—	—	5.8	57.9	2.6
2–9 Jun	CVVM	24.0	**29.0**	15.5	11.5	7.0	2.5	5.5	—	1.5	1.5	1.0	—	—	1.0	60.0	5.0
31 May–10 Jun	STEM	18.3	**25.8**	13.9	8.1	6.3	4.9	5.7	—	3.3	5.3	2.7	—	—	5.7	56.0	7.5
8 May–2 Jun	MEDIAN	18.5	**22.0**	15.0	12.5	7.0	6.0	6.0	—	3.5	3.5	3.0	—	—	3.0	54.0	3.5
20–27 May	STEM	18.0	**27.5**	13.5	9.8	6.0	6.1	6.9	—	3.9	3.3	2.4	—	—	2.6	56.0	9.5
**24–25 May**	**EP election**	**14.17**	**16.13**	**10.98**	**15.95 (Note: Party received 15.95% in coalition with STAN.)**	**7.67**	**3.19**	**9.95**	**15.95 (Note: Party received 15.95% in coalition with TOP 09.)**	**3.77**	**4.78**	**5.24**	—	—	**8.17**	**18.20**	**1.96**
17–23 May	TNS Aisa	18.5	**29.5**	9.5	9.5	7.5	5.5	6.0	—	3.5	4.0	2.5	—	—	4.0	62.0	11.0
15–26 May	ppm Factum	19.4	**22.5**	15.7	9.9	7.6	2.9	6.5	—	5.2	3.0	1.9	—	—	4.0	47.0	3.1
8–14 May	Sanep	20.2	**25.0**	14.9	10.9	5.4	5.9	6.3	—	3.2	3.0	—	—	—	5.2	57.2	4.8
5–12 May	CVVM	23.5	**33.0**	12.5	9.0	5.0	3.0	8.0	—	1.5	2.5	2.0	—	—	1.0	61.0	9.5
8 Apr–8 May	MEDIAN	21.0	**23.0**	15.0	10.0	7.0	5.5	6.5	—	3.5	3.0	3.0	—	—	2.5	59.5	2.0
22–27 Apr	TNS Aisa	18.5	**28.5**	11.5	9.5	6.0	6.5	7.0	—	3.0	3.5	2.0	—	—	4.0	66.0	10.0
14–21 Apr	STEM	20.7	**21.1**	13.7	9.0	4.9	5.2	6.5	—	2.6	3.7	2.2	—	—	4.3	62.0	0.4
7–14 Apr	CVVM	25.0	**30.0**	13.5	10.5	6.0	3.0	6.5	—	2.5	1.0	1.0	—	—	1.0	62.0	5.0
3–9 Apr	Sanep	20.1	**24.8**	15.1	10.8	5.2	6.1	6.4	1.2	—	—	—	—	—	11.5	56.3	4.7
24–30 Mar	TNS Aisa	19.5	**27.0**	12.0	10.0	6.5	9.0	4.5	—	3.0	2.5	—	—	—	6.0	67.0	7.5
1–31 Mar	MEDIAN	**21.0**	19.5	15.0	11.5	8.5	5.0	7.5	—	3.0	3.5	2.5	—	—	3.0	57.5	1.5
11–20 Mar	STEM	20.5	**28.9**	13.3	9.0	7.3	5.0	6.4	—	2.6	2.5	1.3	—	—	3.1	58.0	8.4
6–12 Mar	Sanep	22.9	**23.8**	15.2	10.9	5.2	5.5	6.5	—	—	—	—	—	—	10.0	55.8	0.9
3–10 Mar	CVVM	24.0	**28.0**	14.0	11.0	6.0	5.0	6.0	—	3.5	1.5	—	—	—	1.0	61.0	4.0
20–28 Feb	ppm Factum	18.7	**19.7**	15.9	11.0	7.1	6.4	6.2	—	4.8	2.4	2.3	—	—	5.5	48.0	1.0
18–24 Feb	TNS Aisa	20.5	**22.5**	13.5	9.5	7.5	7.5	7.0	—	5.0	2.0	—	—	—	5.0	65.0	2.0
5–12 Feb	STEM	**21.4**	**21.4**	16.8	9.2	7.5	6.7	7.8	—	2.8	2.3	0.9	—	—	4.1	58.0	**Tie**
3–10 Feb	CVVM	**28.0**	25.0	15.0	11.0	7.5	3.0	5.5	—	2.0	2.0	—	—	—	1.0	66.0	3.0
1–6 Feb	Sanep	22.3	**24.7**	15.2	11.2	4.8	5.3	6.4	—	—	—	—	—	—	10.1	56.7	2.4
23 Jan–4 Feb	ppm Factum	**20.9**	18.5	17.8	11.0	6.7	7.6	5.4	—	4.3	—	—	—	—	7.8	46.0	2.4
13–20 Jan	CVVM	**27.0**	25.0	14.5	12.0	5.0	5.0	6.5	—	1.5	1.5	—	—	—	2.0	62.0	2.0
11–18 Jan	STEM	20.6	**24.3**	16.3	11.0	6.2	6.6	5.7	—	3.3	2.2	0.8	—	—	2.4	60.0	3.7
2–8 Jan	Sanep	20.5	**24.6**	15.7	11.4	5.8	6.5	6.8	—	—	—	—	—	—	8.7	57.2	4.1
2014
5–11 Dec	Sanep	19.8	**25.1**	15.3	12.2	5.2	6.5	7.1	—	—	—	—	—	—	8.8	56.3	5.4
2–9 Dec	STEM	19.9	**22.4**	17.0	10.9	6.9	7.6	6.7	—	3.1	2.2	1.5	—	—	0.8	55.5	2.5
28 Nov–10 Dec	ppm Factum	**19.9**	19.2	17.1	12.5	6.7	6.5	6.9	—	2.7	3.8	—	—	—	4.7	47.0	0.7
11–18 Nov	CVVM	24.0	**24.5**	18.0	9.0	4.0	6.0	7.0	—	3.0	2.5	1.0	—	—	1.0	63.0	0.5
5–13 Nov	ppm Factum	19.5	**20.0**	17.2	11.8	5.8	7.1	6.7	—	2.9	3.7	2.0	—	—	3.3	48.0	0.5
**25-26 Oct 2013**	**Election Results**	**20.5**	**18.7**	**14.9**	**12.0**	**7.7**	**6.9**	**6.8**	—	**3.2**	**2.7**	**2.5**	—	—	**2.6**	**59.5**	**1.8**

== Seats ==
Date	Polling Firm	ČSSD	ANO	KSČM	TOP 09	ODS	ÚSVIT	KDU-ČSL	SPD	ZELENÍ	PIRÁTI	SVOBODNÍ
20 - 21 Oct	2017 parliamentary election	15	78	15	7	25	0	10	22	0	22	0
21 Jun - 3 Jul	STEM	32	89	35	10	20	0	14	0	0	0	0
5 - 25 Jun	TNS Kantar	25	89	27	15	29	0	0	15	0	0	0
5 - 15 Jun	STEM	30	92	32	7	23	0	16	0	0	0	0
9–29 May	TNS Kantar	23	78	25	19	29	0	16	10	0	0	0
1 - 24 Apr	Kantar TNS	31	80	25	11	28	0	14	11	0	0	0
6 - 14 Apr	STEM	45	80	30	12	18	0	15	0	0	0	0
6 - 12 Apr	Sanep	41	70	32	16	23	0	0	18	0	0	0
3 - 24 Mar	Kantar TNS	34	81	29	12	20	0	12	12	0	0	0
2 - 6 Mar	Sanep	40	67	28	12	22	0	15	16	0	0	0
4 Feb - 3 Mar	Kantar TNS	50	78	23	11	25	0	14	11	0	0	0
2 - 8 Feb	SANEP	41	66	28	13	22	0	15	15	0	0	0
1 - 23 Jan	STEM	39	87	33	0	25	0	16	0	0	0	0
5 - 10 Jan	Sanep	37	67	28	14	24	0	16	14	0	0	0
2017
30 Nov - 20 Dec	STEM	44	84	34	7	16	0	15	0	0	0	0
5 - 25 Nov	TNS Aisa	36	85	20	11	22	0	15	11	0	0	0
27 Oct - 2 Nov	Sanep	38	63	30	15	27	0	14	13	0	0	0
8 - 27 Oct	TNS Aisa	38	85	17	17	21	0	11	11	0	0	0
13-21 October	STEM	34	78	33	15	21	0	14	5	0	0	0
30 Aug - 15 Sep	STEM	53	67	34	19	13	0	14	0	0	0	0
6 - 26 Aug	TNS Aisa	47	78	28	14	23	0	10	0	0	0	0
11 - 17 Aug	Sanep	48	60	33	15	28	0	16	0	0	0	0
23-29 Jul 2016	TNS Aisa	44	77	27	12	25	0	15	0	0	0	0
7-12 Jul	Sanep	52	56	34	15	27	0	16	0	0	0	0
2-7 Jun	Sanep	46	59	36	16	28	0	15	0	0	0	0
5–11 May	Sanep	47	57	36	16	28	0	16	0	0	0	0
1-6 Apr	Sanep	53	54	36	14	28	0	15	0	0	0	0
10-16 Mar	Sanep	46	53	35	14	26	12	14	0	0	0	0
4-10 Feb	Sanep	52	60	32	15	26	0	15	0	0	0	0
1-5 Jan	Sanep	50	59	34	16	25	0	16	0	0	0	0
2016
3-8 Dec	Sanep	49	60	35	15	25	0	16	0	0	0	0
12-18 Nov	Sanep	51	57	35	16	25	0	16	0	0	0	0
1-7 Oct	Sanep	52	55	34	20	24	0	15	0	0	0	0
3-8 Sep	Sanep	54	54	33	23	21	0	15	0	0	0	0
13-18 Aug	Sanep	53	54	33	23	21	0	16	0	0	0	0
18-24 Jun	Sanep	53	54	34	22	21	0	16	0	0	0	0
14–18 May	Sanep	54	54	33	23	20	0	16	0	0	0	0
2-8 Apr	Sanep	54	53	34	23	19	0	17	0	0	0	0
19-29 Mar	ppm Factum	52	58	43	21	11	0	15	0	0	0	0
5-11 Mar	Sanep	56	56	31	23	17	0	17	0	0	0	0
20 Feb-3 Mar	ppm Factum	57	67	39	19	12	0	9	0	0	0	0
1–3 Feb	ppm Factum	47	59	39	21	9	12	13	0	0	0	0
8–14 Jan	Sanep	55	56	32	23	15	0	19	0	0	0	0
2015
1–9 Dec	ppm Factum	54	58	41	23	12	0	14	0	0	0	0
4–8 Dec	Sanep	55	58	31	22	16	0	18	0	0	0	0
6–12 Nov	Sanep	51	62	30	23	15	0	19	0	0	0	0
16-20 Oct	Sanep	53	57	32	23	17	0	18	0	0	0	0
3–14 Oct	ppm Factum	47	58	36	23	13	8	15	0	0	0	0
17 - 28 Sep	ppm Factum	49	58	42	18	13	7	13	0	0	0	0
4–10 Sep	Sanep	48	57	36	31	13	0	15	0	0	0	0
1–6 Aug	Sanep	49	56	36	30	13	0	16	0	0	0	0
21–29 Jul	ppm Factum	51	60	44	25	10	0	10	0	0	0	0
3–9 Jul	Sanep	49	57	35	30	13	0	16	0	0	0	0
6–10 Jun	Sanep	47	54	34	26	12	0	15	0	0	12	0
15–26 May	ppm Factum	48	59	39	20	16	0	12	0	6	0	0
8–14 May	Sanep	46	56	34	25	12	13	14	0	0	0	0
3–9 Apr	Sanep	45	56	34	24	12	14	15	0	0	0	0
6–12 Mar	Sanep	51	53	34	24	12	12	14	0	0	0	0
20–28 Feb	ppm Factum	48	51	40	23	14	11	13	0	0	0	0
1–6 Feb	Sanep	52	58	36	26	0	13	15	0	0	0	0
23 Jan–4 Feb	ppm Factum	51	47	43	24	11	16	8	0	0	0	0
2–8 Jan	Sanep	45	54	34	25	13	14	15	0	0	0	0
2014
5–11 Dec	Sanep	43	55	34	27	11	14	16	0	0	0	0
28 Nov-10 Dec	ppm Factum	47	48	41	29	10	11	14	0	0	0	0
5–13 Nov	ppm Factum	48	48	42	25	8	15	14	0	0	0	0
25-26 Oct 2013	Election Results	50	47	33	26	16	14	14	0	0	0	0

== Map of voters ==
Behavio company and Charles University made a poll showing map of voters. According to this poll Civic Democratic Party, Czech Pirate Party, Christian and Democratic Union – Czechoslovak People's Party (as Populars and Mayors) and Green Party and TOP 09 can hold a strongest fight for voters according to the poll. Czech Social Democratic Party might have a problem because many of its voters are going for ANO 2011.

== Other surveys ==
Date	Polling Firm	ČSSD	ANO	KSČM	TOP 09	ODS	KDU-ČSL	STAN	ZELENÍ	PIRÁTI	SVOBODNÍ	SPD	REAL	Others	Lead
24 Oct - 1 Nov 2017	Prezident21	3	-1139	-322	1176	1442	191	—	—	1433	—	-1052	—	—	9
34 - 4 Oct 2017	Student election	2.48%	11.88%	3.29%	11.75%	6.14%	3.49%	2.29%	6.33%	24.52%	1.87%	7.76%	1.95%		12.64%
