= Jaroslav Holík (politician) =

Czech politician

Jaroslav Holík MP

Member of the Chamber of Deputies
- In office 26 October 2013 – 21 October 2021

Personal details
- Born: 29 June 1954 (age 71) Czech Republic
- Party: KSČM (until 2012); Dawn of Direct Democracy (2013–2015); Freedom and Direct Democracy (2015–present)

Jaroslav Holík (born 29. June 1953) is a Czech politician and a former member of the Chamber of Deputies from 2013 to 2021.

Holík is a graduate of the Brno University of Technology and owned a motorcycle repair business. Holík first entered politics as a municipal councilor in Březůvky Municipal Council in the Zlín District for the Communist Party of Bohemia and Moravia. For the 2013 Czech legislative election, he stood as a candidate for Tomio Okamura's Dawn of Direct Democracy party and was elected to the Chamber of Deputies for the Zlín region. In 2015, he joined Okamura's new Freedom and Direct Democracy (SPD) party and became leader of the party in Zlín. He was returned to the Chamber as an MP for the SPD in 2017.
