= 2012 President of the Senate of the Czech Republic election =

- 21 November 2012
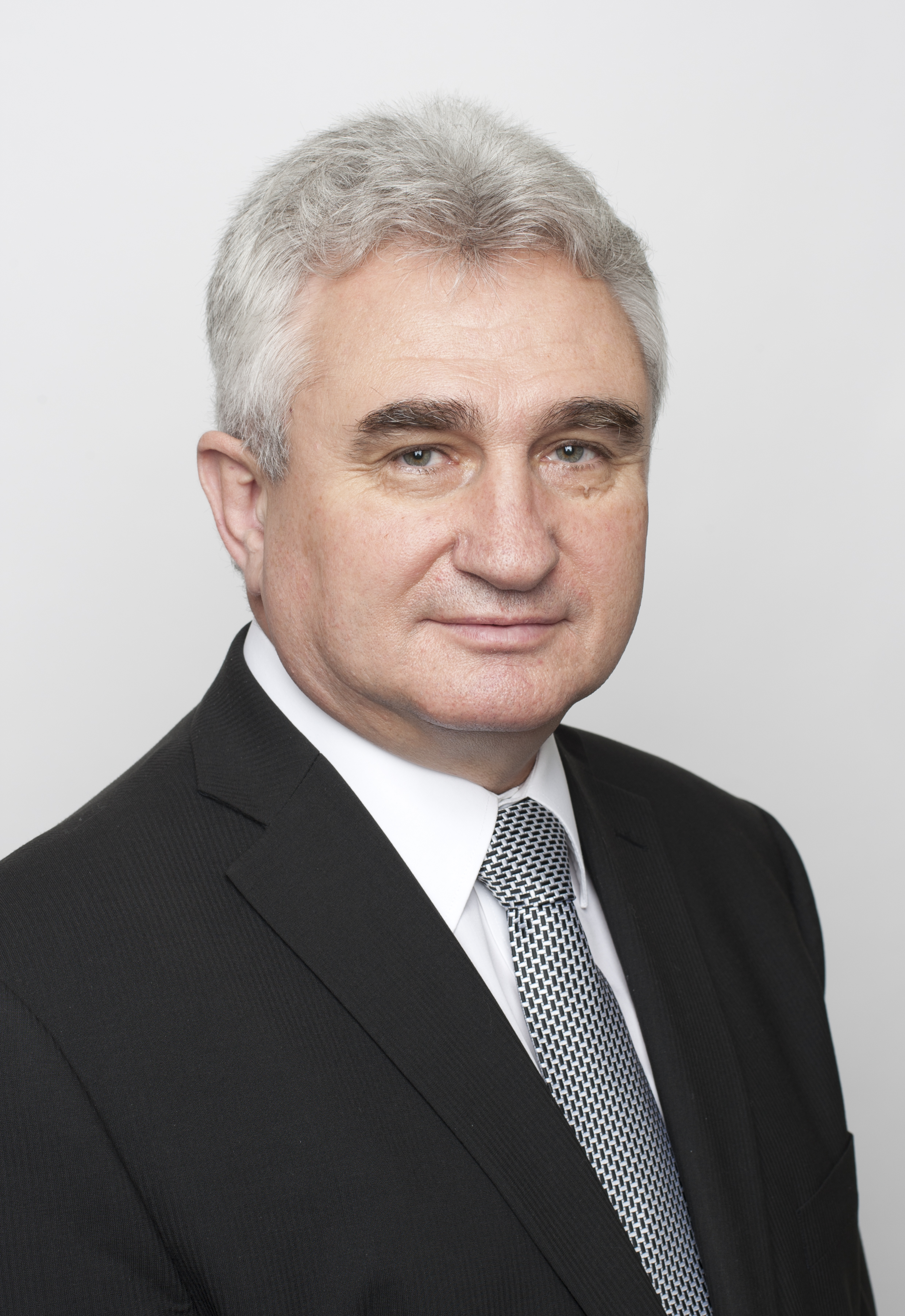
Candidate	Milan Štěch
Party	ČSSD
Popular vote	74
Percentage	93.7%
President before election
Milan Štěch
ČSSD
Elected President
Milan Štěch
ČSSD

Election of the President of the Senate of the Czech Republic was held on 21 November 2012. Milan Štěch was reelected for his second term.

== Background and voting ==
Czech Social Democratic Party has won 2012 Senate election. Party's gains gave Milan Štěch strong position to be reelected as the President of the Senate. Party nominated him as the only candidate.

Voting took place on 21 November 2012. Štěch received 74 votes of 79.
