= 2014 President of the Senate of the Czech Republic election =

- 19 November 2014
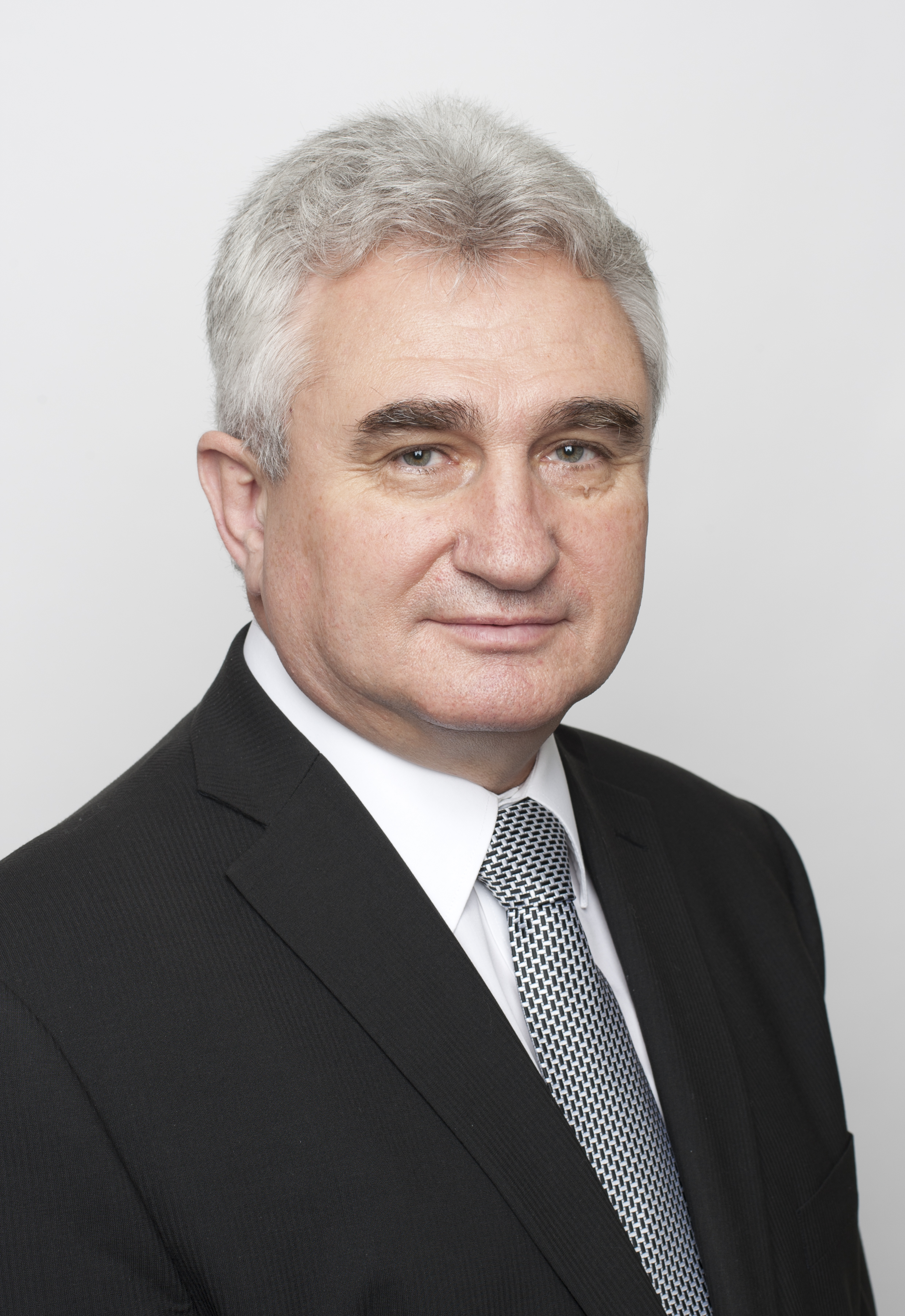
Candidate	Milan Štěch
Party	ČSSD
Popular vote	70
Percentage	89.7%
President before election
Milan Štěch
ČSSD
Elected President
Milan Štěch
ČSSD

Election of the President of the Senate of the Czech Republic was held on 19 November 2014. Milan Štěch was reelected for his third term.

== Background and voting ==
Czech Social Democratic Party has won 2014 Senate election despite heavy losses. The incumbent Senate President Milan Štěch remained Senator and announced his intention to run for another term.

Election was held on 19 November 2014. Štěch was the only candidate and received 70 votes of 78 and thus was elected for his third term.
