= 2016 President of the Senate of the Czech Republic election =

- 16 November 2016
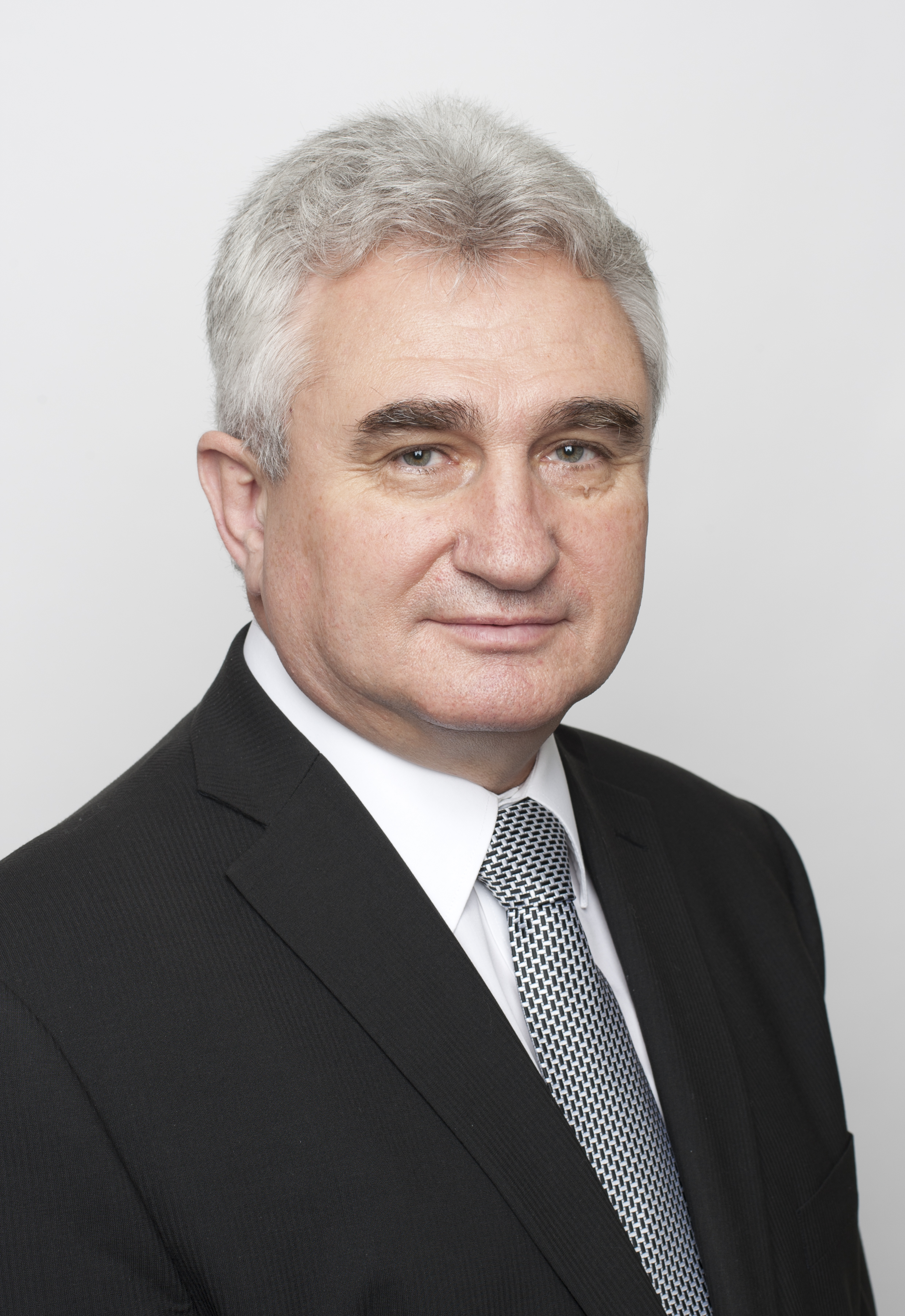
Candidate	Milan Štěch
Party	ČSSD
Popular vote	54
Percentage	69.2%
President before election
Milan Štěch
ČSSD
Elected President
Milan Štěch
ČSSD

Election of the President of the Senate of the Czech Republic was held on 16 November 2016. Milan Štěch was reelected for his fourth term when he received 54 votes of 78.

== Background and voting ==
Czech Social Democratic Party remained largest Senate party after 2016 senate election. The party decided to nominate the incumbent Milan Štěch for the position of Senate President. The Civic Democratic Party and ANO 2011 agreed to support him.

Christian and Democratic Union – Czechoslovak People's Party and Mayors and Independents announced on 3 November 2016 that they won't support Štěch's reelection due to his signature under controversial Declaration of four constitutional representatives which they consider "servile" towards China. Neither party nominated a candidate.

Voting took place on 14 November 2016. Štěch received 54 of 78 votes and was elected for another term.
