= 2010 President of the Senate of the Czech Republic election =

- 24 November 2010
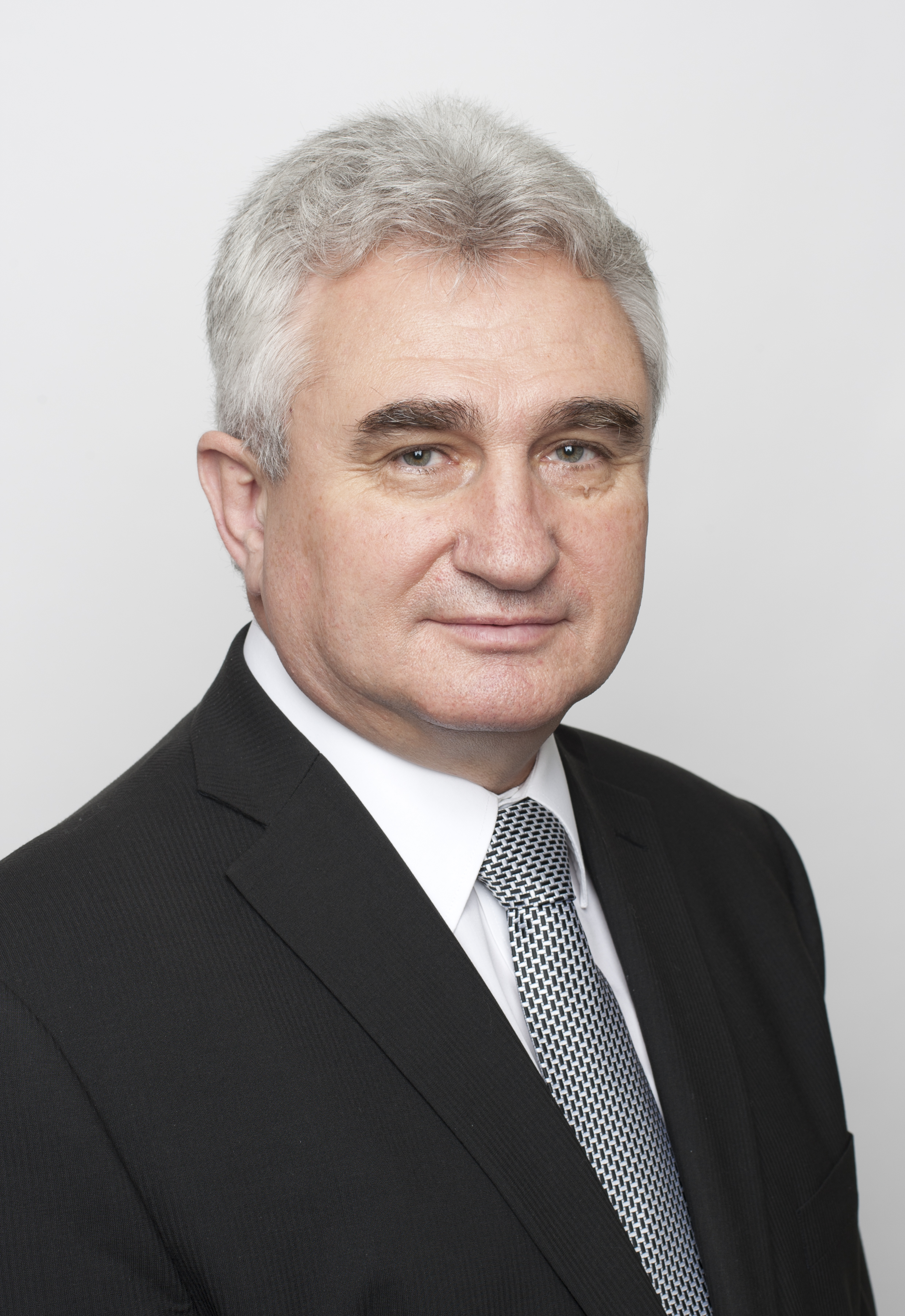
Candidate	Milan Štěch
Party	ČSSD
Popular vote	69
Percentage	85.2%
President before election
Přemysl Sobotka
ODS
Elected President
Milan Štěch
ČSSD

An election was held on 24 November 2010 to choose a new president of the Senate of the Czech Republic. Milan Štěch became the new president.

== Background and voting ==
The Czech Social Democratic Party (ČSSD) won the 2010 senate election and became the largest grouping in the Senate, with 41 seats of 81. The Civic Democratic Party suffered heavy losses and the incumbent President Přemysl Sobotka decided to not seek another term. Former Czech Prime Minister Vladimír Špidla ran for a senate seat in the Český Krumlov district. He was considered as a ČSSD candidate for the senate president but was defeated by Tomáš Jirsa in his Senate bid and was thusineligible.

Milan Štěch and Zdeněk Škromach expressed interest in running for the position of senate president. Alena Gajdůšková was also speculated as a potential candidate. ČSSD eventually decided to nominate Milan Štěch as the sole candidate.

Voting was held om 24 November 2018. Štěch received 69 votes of 81 and became the new president.
