= We do not want Islam in the Czech Republic =

Czech anti-Islam group

- Islám v České republice nechceme
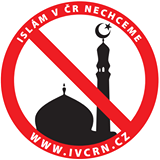
- Abbreviation: IVČRN
- Founded: 2009
- Purpose: Anti-Islam campaign
- Location: Czech Republic
- Key people: Martin Konvička
- Website: ivcrn.cz

We do not want Islam in the Czech Republic (Czech: Islám v České republice nechceme, IVČRN) is a Czech anti-Islam organisation led by Martin Konvička, founded in 2009. The Czech Ministry of the Interior has described the initiative as an Islamophobic populist entity which is attempting to take advantage of the rise of anti-Islamic and anti-immigrant sentiment. According to the ministry, it intentionally uses information that is taken out of context, misinterpreted or generalised.

== History ==
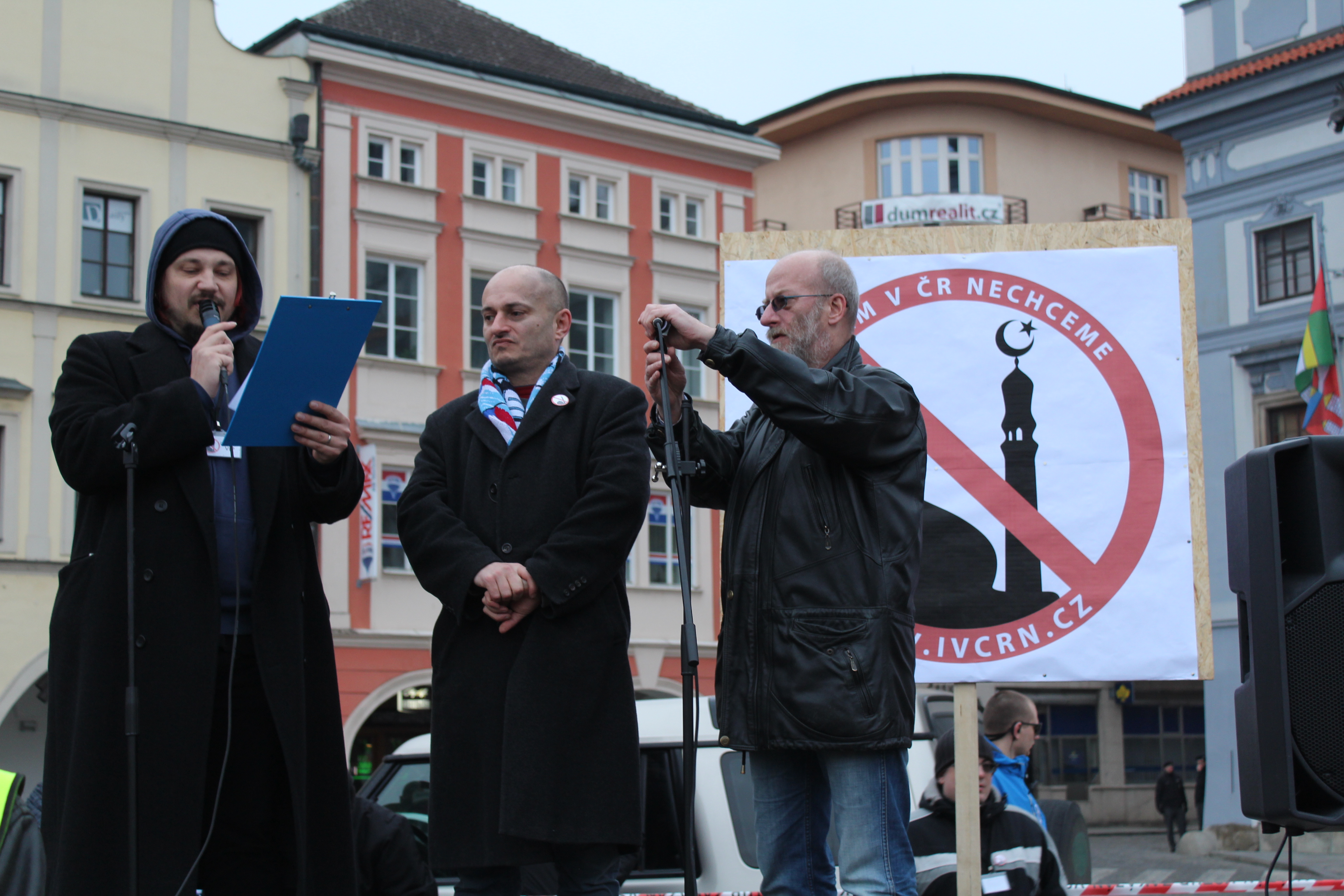
Activists for IVČRN, including Martin Konvička in 2015

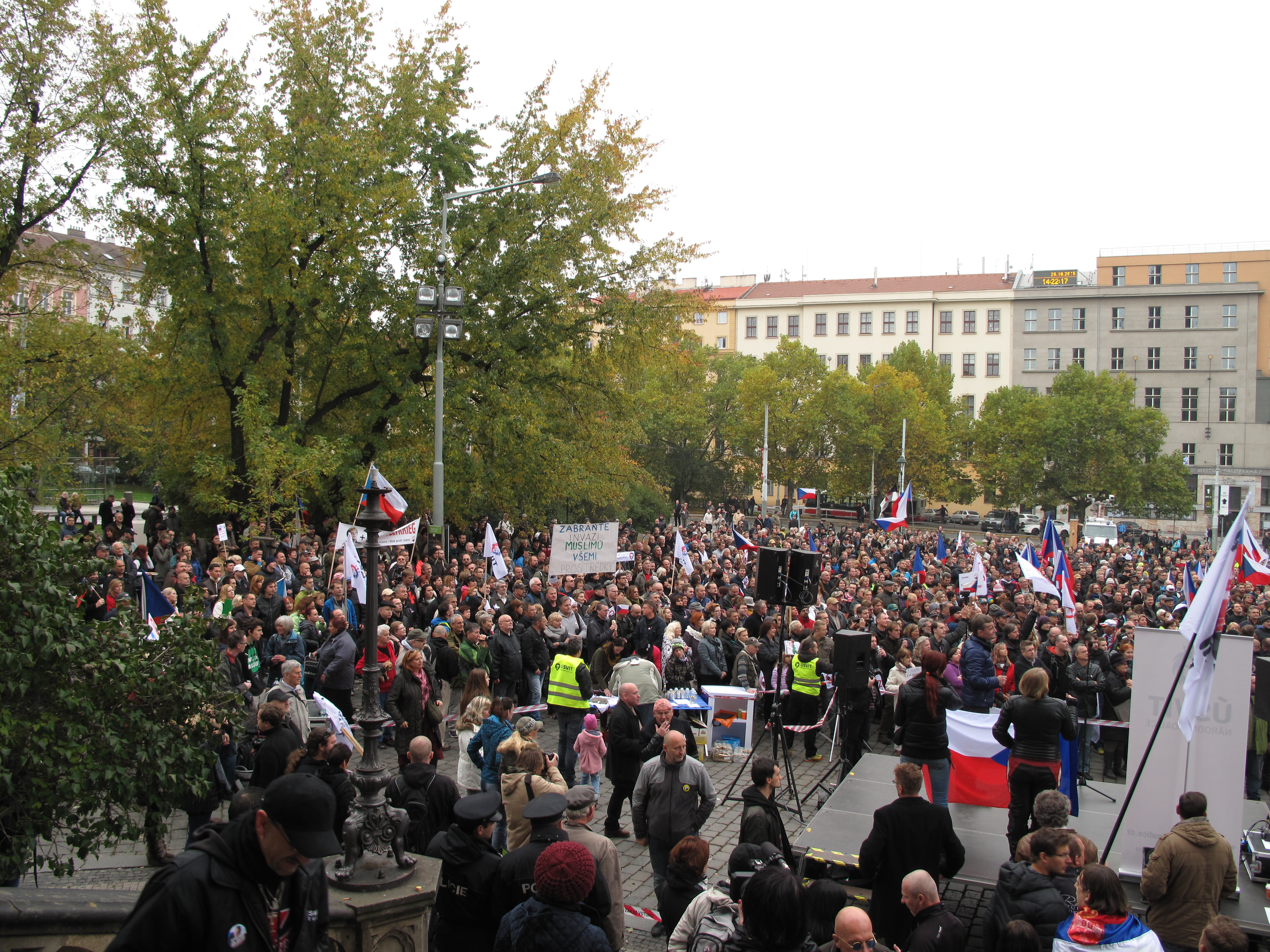
Demonstration by Bloc Against Islam and Dawn – National Coalition in 2015

IVČRN was created in July 2009 as a discussion community on Facebook, with a few hundred users. According to the Ministry of the Interior, the platform was created as a transformation of the pre-existing Czech Defence League (CzDL), based on the English Defence League, which was assessed as extremist and subsequently disappeared. The group draws ideologically from the counter-jihad movement.

The group's Facebook page has been banned several times, first in 2014 when it had 162,000 followers, and then in 2016, when it had 73,000 followers. The original page with 162,000 followers was restored in December 2016.

=== Bloc Against Islam ===
On 17 November 2015, the closely associated group Bloc Against Islam (Czech: Blok proti islámu, BPI) held a rally that was attended by President Miloš Zeman, who also spoke at the event.

On 6 February 2016, thousands of people attended a demonstration co-organised by IVČRN, the German group Pegida, and the political party Dawn – National Coalition, which was the largest anti-Islam demonstration held in the Czech Republic.
