= Chlum u Třeboně =

- Market town
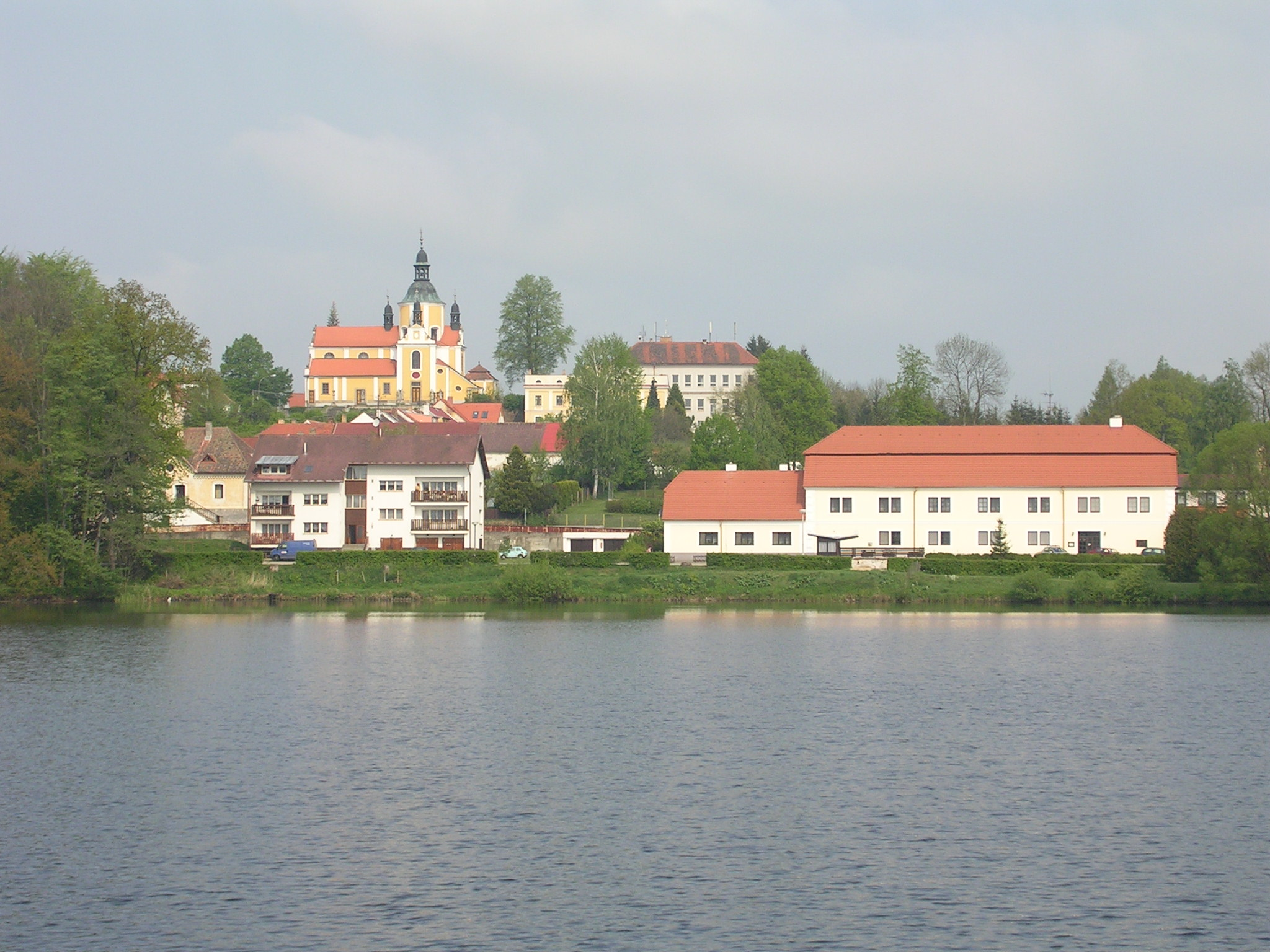
- View across the Hejtman Pond

- Flag Coat of arms

- Location in the Czech Republic
- Coordinates: 48°57′45″N 14°55′41″E
- Country: Czech Republic
- Region: South Bohemian
- District: Jindřichův Hradec
- First mentioned: 1399

Area
  - Total: 47.38 km^{2} (18.29 sq mi)
- Elevation: 490 m (1,610 ft)

Population (2026-01-01)
  - Total: 1,815
  - Density: 38.31/km^{2} (99.22/sq mi)
- Time zone: UTC+1 (CET)
  - Summer (DST): UTC+2 (CEST)
- Postal code: 378 04
- Website: www.chlum-ut.cz

Chlum u Třeboně (Czech pronunciation: [ˈxlum ˈu tr̝̊ɛboɲɛ]; German: Chlumetz) is a market town in Jindřichův Hradec District in the South Bohemian Region of the Czech Republic. It has about 1,800 inhabitants.

== Administrative division ==
Chlum u Třeboně consists of four municipal parts (in brackets population according to the 2021 census):

- Chlum u Třeboně (1,484)
- Lutová (87)
- Mirochov (84)
- Žíteč (178)

== Etymology ==
Chlum is a common Czech toponym. The word chlum meant 'hill' in old Czech. The suffix u Třeboně means 'near Třeboň'.

== Geography ==
Chlum u Třeboně is located about 20 kilometres (12 mi) south of Jindřichův Hradec and 33 km (21 mi) east of České Budějovice. It lies mostly in the Třeboň Basin, only a small part of the municipal territory in the east extends into the Javořice Highlands. The highest point is at 500 m (1,600 ft) above sea level. The entire territory lies within the Třeboňsko Protected Landscape Area.

The municipal territory is very rich in fishponds; the largest of them are Staré Jezero with an area of 83 ha (210 acres) and Hejtman with an area of 78 ha (190 acres). The market town proper is situated on the banks of the stream Koštěnický potok and on the shore of Hejtman, supplied by the Koštěnický potok. Hejtman was founded in 1554 and in addition to fish farming, it is used for water sports and recreation.

== History ==
The first written mention of Chlum u Třeboně is from 1399. From the beginning of the 15th century until 1508, the estate was owned by the Rosenberg family. In 1505–1575, the estate was a property of the Krajíř of Krajek family. During their rule, establishment of fishponds in the area began and a fortress in Chlum was built.

The next notable owners of Chlum were the Slavata family (1615–1693) and the Counts of Fünfkirchen (1693–1834). The Fünfkirchens significantly affected the local economy. Glass making was established here in the mid-18th century and production of iron started in 1796. From 1834 to 1861, Chlum was owned by Counts of Stadion. During their rule, in 1857, Chlum was promoted to a market town. In 1861, they sold the estate to Francis V, Duke of Modena. In 1875, Chlum was inherited by Archduke Franz Ferdinand of Austria. He had stopped all the industrial activity in the market town, had rebuilt the local castle into its present form and used it as a summer residence.

== Demographics ==
Historical population

Year	Pop.	±%
1869	2,878	—
1880	3,141	+9.1%
1890	3,123	−0.6%
1900	3,541	+13.4%
1910	2,959	−16.4%

Year	Pop.	±%
1921	2,899	−2.0%
1930	3,087	+6.5%
1950	2,266	−26.6%
1961	2,298	+1.4%
1970	2,363	+2.8%

Year	Pop.	±%
1980	2,394	+1.3%
1991	2,270	−5.2%
2001	2,265	−0.2%
2011	2,055	−9.3%
2021	1,833	−10.8%

Source: Censuses

== Transport ==
There are no railways or major roads passing through the market town.

== Sights ==
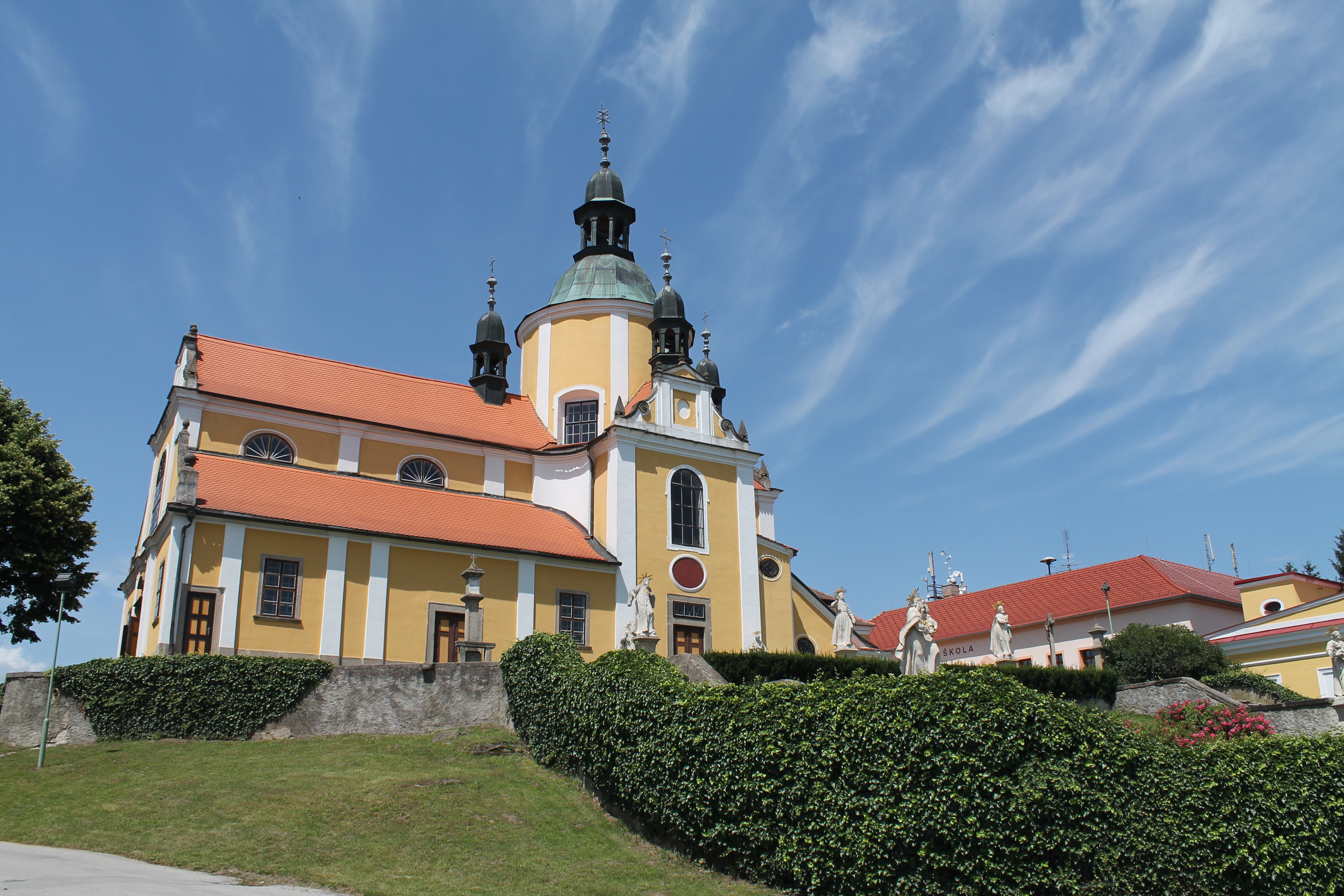
Church of the Assumption of the Virgin Mary

The Chlum u Třeboně Castle was built in 1719 on the site of the old fortress. In 1901–1903, the Baroque castle was rebuilt in the neo-Baroque style. Next to the castle is a romantic park. It is one of the most significant preserved Baroque areas in southern Bohemia. Today the castle is privately owned and used as a hotel.

The Church of the Assumption of the Virgin Mary was built in the Baroque style in 1745. It is a Marian pilgrimage site whose appearance was inspired by the Mariazell Basilica. In 1805, the church was extended.

The Church of All Saints is located in Lutová. It was originally a Gothic church, built before 1359. After 1615, it was rebuilt in the Mannerism style, but retained the Gothic core. Further modifications took place in 1875.

== Notable people ==
- Otto Jindra (1886–1932), World War I flying ace
- Miroslav Lidinský (born 1972), politician
