= Jaroslav Chalupský =

Czech politician

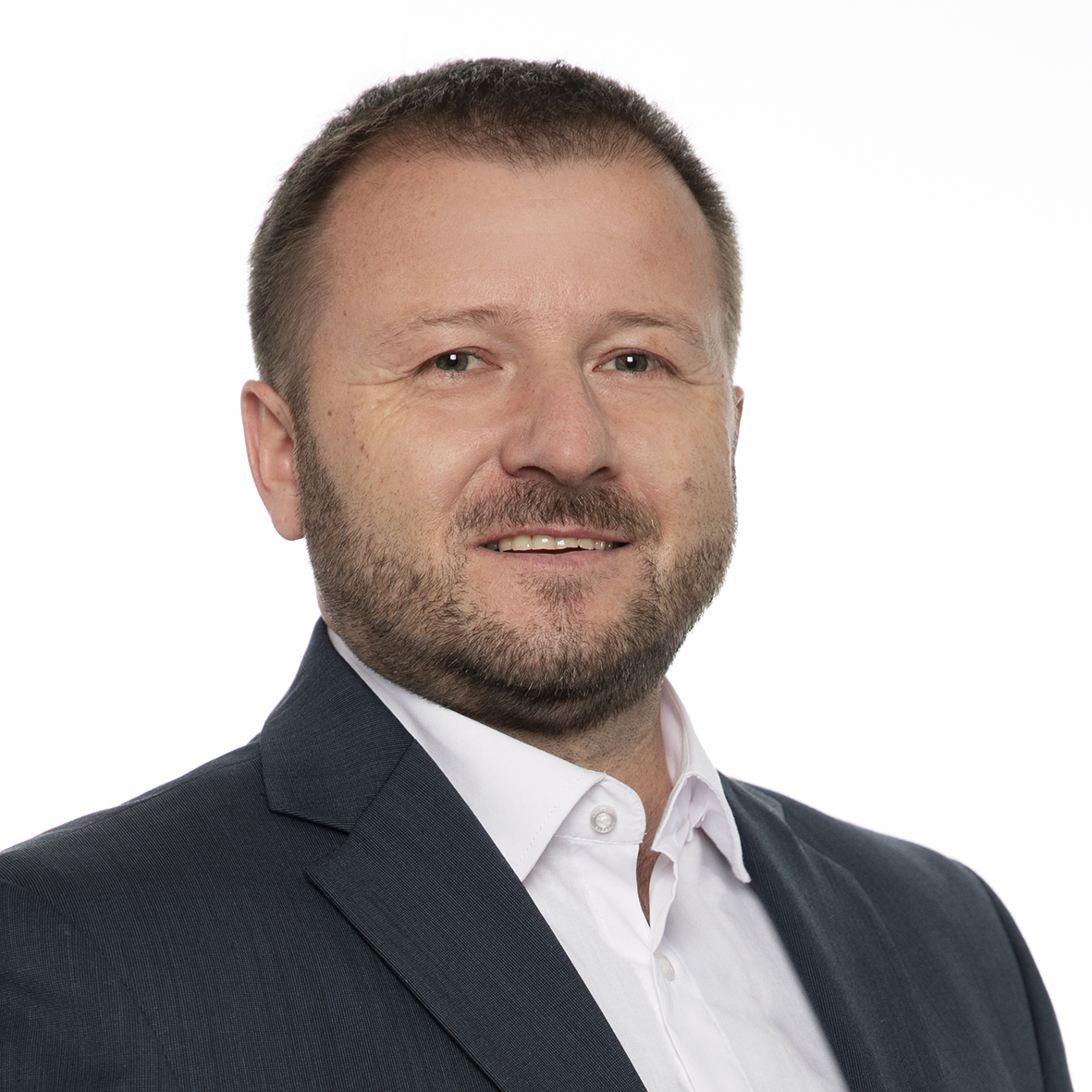

Senator from Pelhřimov
- In office 10 October 2020 – 10 October 2026
- Preceded by: Milan Štěch
- Succeeded by: Ladislav Med

Personal details
- Born: 27 April 1974 (age 52) Jindřichův Hradec, Czechoslovakia (now Czech Republic)
- Party: Svobodní (2020–2026); HSR (since 2026)

Jaroslav Chalupský is a Czech politician who served as Senator for Svobodní representing Pelhřimov from 2020 to 2026. He became senator after he narrowly beat Milan Štěch. He then joined ODS-TOP 09 Senate caucus.
