= Březůvky =

- Municipality
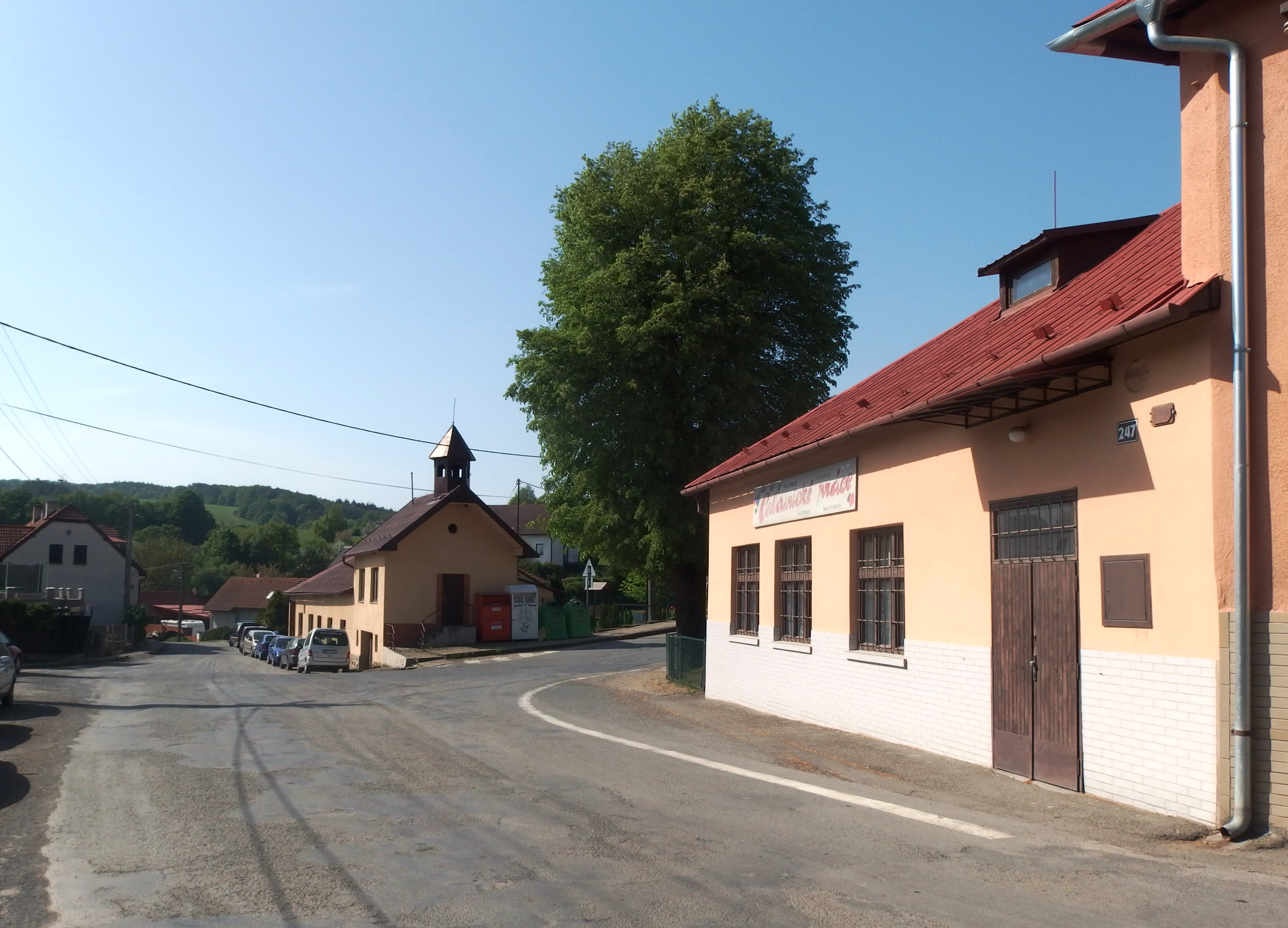
- Centre of Březůvky

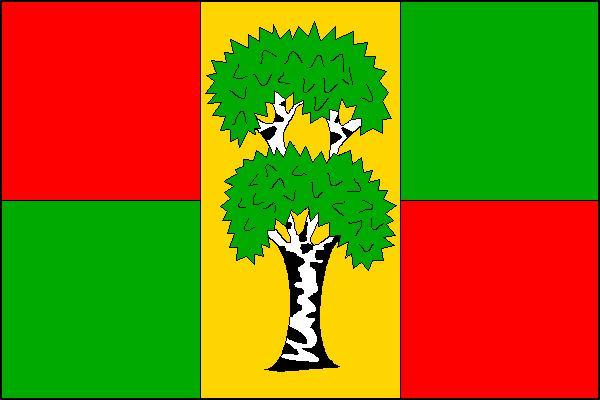
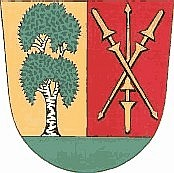
- Flag Coat of arms

- Location in the Czech Republic
- Coordinates: 49°9′12″N 17°41′59″E
- Country: Czech Republic
- Region: Zlín
- District: Zlín
- First mentioned: 1406

Area
  - Total: 7.97 km^{2} (3.08 sq mi)
- Elevation: 349 m (1,145 ft)

Population (2026-01-01)
  - Total: 753
  - Density: 94.5/km^{2} (245/sq mi)
- Time zone: UTC+1 (CET)
  - Summer (DST): UTC+2 (CEST)
- Postal code: 763 45
- Website: www.brezuvky.cz

Březůvky is a municipality and village in Zlín District in the Zlín Region of the Czech Republic. It has about 800 inhabitants.

Březůvky lies approximately 9 kilometres (6 mi) south of Zlín and 259 km (161 mi) south-east of Prague.

== Demographics ==
Historical population
Year	Pop.	±%
1869	464	—
1880	530	+14.2%
1890	552	+4.2%
1900	638	+15.6%
1910	700	+9.7%
1921	674	−3.7%
1930	693	+2.8%
1950	767	+10.7%
1961	791	+3.1%
1970	745	−5.8%
1980	686	−7.9%
1991	634	−7.6%
2001	629	−0.8%
2011	655	+4.1%
2021	693	+5.8%
Source: Censuses
