= Populars and Mayors =

Populars and Mayors Lidovci a Starostové
- Leader: Pavel Bělobrádek
- Founded: 2017
- Dissolved: 2017
- Ideology: Pro-Europeanism; Regionalism
- Political position: Centre
- Slogan: Síla, kterou má smysl volit' ('Power worth voting for')
- Coalition Partners: KDU–ČSL; STAN

Website
- http://www.lidovcistarostove.cz/

The Populars and Mayors (Czech: Lidovci a Starostové) was an alliance of Czech political parties, consisting of the Christian and Democratic Union – Czechoslovak People's Party (KDU-ČSL) and Mayors and Independents. Talks about a possible alliance of the two parties started in 2016, with the intention of participating in the 2017 legislative election, and becoming the "third power" of Czech politics. The alliance was dissolved in July 2017, before the election took place.

== History ==
The alliance was formed on 18 March 2017, with some leading members suggesting that they could win over 15% of votes. On 12 April 2017, KDU-ČSL leader Pavel Bělobrádek was announced as the alliance's candidate for Prime Minister. The logo and name of the alliance was announced on 15 May 2017.

An electoral alliance of political parties requires 10% of votes to enter the Chamber of Deputies, and following opinion polls showing Populars and Mayors to be under the 10% threshold, some media reported that KDU–ČSL were planning to disband the alliance and offer STAN candidates places on their ballot list. Bělobrádek refused to comment these reports, while Gazdík denied that the parties would end the alliance, stating that if KDU-ČSL disbands the alliance, STAN will participate in the election independently. STAN MEP Stanislav Polčák confirmed the media reports. Sources within KDU-ČSL said that KDU-ČSL were trying to persuade STAN to run on the KDU-ČSL ballot but they were refusing.

On 18 July 2017, the KDU-ČSL leadership met to discuss the matter, and voted to leave the alliance. Bělobrádek called for STAN to run on the KDU-ČSL ballot. Gazdík stated that party would need to discuss the matter. STAN refused the offer on 25 July 2017, ending the cooperation between the two parties.

== Logo ==
The alliance presented its logo on 15 May 2017. It consists of a triangle formed of four stripes. The four stripes are intended to represent family, municipality, region and state. Petr Gazdík, leader of Mayors and Independents, stated that the triangle represents the idea that decision making should start in families and municipalities in a well-functioning society. The logo is also supposed to represent power.

The logo became the target of jokes, with critics highlighting its similarity to the Adidas logo, the Stalin Memorial at Letná, the logo of financial Company OVB, and the symbol indicating a strong Wi-fi signal.
