= Miroslav Lidinský =

Czech politician

Leader of the Dawn – National Coalition
- In office 8 August 2015 – 20 March 2018
- Preceded by: Marek Černoch
- Succeeded by: Position abolished

Personal details
- Born: 23 September 1972 (age 54) Chlum u Třeboně, Czechoslovakia
- Party: Dawn – National Coalition
- Children: 1
- Education: University of South Bohemia in České Budějovice; University of Defence

Military service
- Allegiance: Czech Republic
- Branch/service: Czech Army
- Rank: Second Lieutenant
- Battles/wars: War in Afghanistan

Miroslav Lidinský (born 23 September 1972) is a Czech politician and former policeman. He was member of the Special Operations Unit of the Military Police and is a retired lieutenant at the Ministry of Defence. From August 2015 to March 2018, he was the chairman of the political party Dawn – National Coalition.

== Life ==
Lidinský was born on 23 September 1972 in Chlum u Třeboně, Czechoslovakia (now the Czech Republic). After studying at a technical college in Prague, he worked as a technologist. He later joined the Czechoslovak Border Guard, which was transformed into the Border Police and was subsequently incorporated into the Czech Police. He joined the Police of the Czech Republic in 1993, and first worked as a police officer in his hometown of Chlum u Třeboně. In 1996 he then moved to the operations unit in the České Budějovice, and spent ten years there. During that time he graduated from the Pedagogical Faculty of the University of South Bohemia in České Budějovice and the University of Defence. He taught at the University of Defence as an instructor of physical education for medical rescuers. He later became an instructor for diving, pyrotechnics, aerial rescue, and instructor for firearms training.

In November 2006 he joined the Special Operations Unit of the Military Police – SOG (Special Operations Group) and was trained to specially to combat terrorism domestically and abroad. In 2007 he was deployed in Afghanistan along with comrades in the SOG to handle special tasks directly alongside British coalition forces. On 28 July 2007 Lidinský was in the Helmand province and was seriously wounded when a Taliban fighter fired an anti-tank missile RPG that landed right between his legs and blew off his left ankle. In 2010 his leg had to be amputated below the knee.

In the aftermath of his injury, Lidinský went looking for alternative sports. His partner introduced him to golf, in which he eventually became a successful as a disabled athlete – acting as president of the Czech Gold Association Handicapped (CZDGA) and became a member of the national team of the Czech Republic until it was disbanded. From 2010 to 2013 he was a four-time winner of the European Cup EDGA (European Disabled Golf Association).

Divorced since 2008, Lidinský has a daughter Klára. As of 2017, he lives in Nový Knín.

== Political career ==
In the Czech Senate elections of 2014, he ran as an independent for the Civic Conservative Party (OKS) in the Pelhřimov District, and gained 2.82% of the votes and ended up in 8th place.

In 2015 he became a member of the tiny political party The Dawn of Direct Democracy, in July of the same year he designated Marek Černoch to lead the movement at the electoral conference in August 2015. He was then elected as chairman of the movement on 8 August 2015, and renamed the party Dawn – National Coalition.

== Military decorations ==
Lidinský was awarded the Karel Kramář Medal for Courage (2008), Silver and Bronze Cross of Merit Minister of Defense (2009, 2008) and further 10 other awards.
