= Dawn – National Coalition =

Dawn – National Coalition Úsvit – Národní koalice
- Leader: Tomio Okamura; Marek Černoch; Miroslav Lidinský
- Founded: 13 June 2013
- Dissolved: 20 March 2018
- Headquarters: Papírenská 6B, 160 00 Prague 6
- Membership: 273
- Ideology: Right-wing populism; Euroscepticism
- Political position: Far-right
- Colours: Blue (Note: as Dawn – National Coalition); Green (Note: as Dawn of Direct Democracy)

Dawn – National Coalition (Czech: Úsvit – Národní koalice), also known as Dawn (from June 2014 to August 2015), Dawn of Direct Democracy (Úsvit přímé demokracie) or Tomio Okamura's Dawn of Direct Democracy (from June 2013 to June 2014; Úsvit přímé demokracie Tomia Okamury), was a right-wing populist, Eurosceptic political party in the Czech Republic.

== Origins ==
The party was founded in May 2013 by Tomio Okamura, an independent senator attached to the Christian Democratic parliamentary group. Tomio Okamura's Dawn of Direct Democracy supported the implementation of direct democracy at all levels "as a solution to the corruption, nepotism, clientelism and kleptocracy," the use of referendums, the direct election of deputies, senators, mayors and regional governors, a presidential system and, consequently, a stronger separation of powers.

Founding members of Dawn of Direct Democracy included members of Public Affairs, a former member of the Civic Democratic Party, and a representative of Moravané.

In the parliamentary election of 2013 the party obtained 342,339 votes (6.88%), winning 14 seats. These included two deputies elected in the Central Bohemian Region, and one each in all others except the Plzen Region and Karlovy Vary Region.

== Party split ==
On 19 January 2015, Chief Whip Radim Fiala was removed and replaced by Marek Černoch.

In February 2015, most of the nine members of the party and the 14 members of the Dawn parliamentary group decided to establish a new party, without leader Tomio Okamura. On 26 February 2015, Okamura announced that the party was experiencing serious financial difficulties. Since their election to the parliament, the party had been receiving millions of Czech crowns from the state each year.

Several members of Dawn have created new parties, including Freedom and Direct Democracy, led by Okamura, and the Party of National Interests led by Petr Adam.

Original logo of the party

On 7 July 2015, Dawn announced plans to merge with the Party of the National Interests, which they did in August the same year. Retired veteran Miroslav Lidinský was elected as party chairman and the name was changed to Dawn – National Coalition. They also began working with the We do not want Islam in the Czech Republic group led by Martin Konvička. However, this collaboration also failed soon after, and Dawn's popularity has continued to decline. According to opinion polling, Dawn was unlikely to exceed the threshold for entry into parliament at the 2017 legislative elections.

Dawn MP Martin Lank left the party in May 2017, which reduced the parliamentary group to six MPs, further reduced to five on 6 June 2017 with the departure of Jana Hnyková. On 7 June 2017, Marek Černoch also left Dawn.

Dawn did not participate in the 2017 legislative election. In July 2017, prominent party members stated their intention to participate in local elections in 2018. The party was dissolved in March 2018.

== Election results ==
=== Chamber of Deputies ===
Year	Vote	Vote %	Seats	Place
2013	342,339	6.88	14 / 200	6th

=== Senate ===
Election	First round			Second round			Seats
Election	Votes	%	Places	Votes	%	Places	Seats
2014	13,331	1.30	11th	-	-	-	0 / 27

=== European Parliament ===
Election	Votes	Share of votes in %	Seats obtained	Place
2014	47,306	3.12	0 / 22	10th

=== Local election ===
Election	Share of votes in %	Councillors
2014	0.65	54

== Leaders ==
- Tomio Okamura 2013-2015
- Marek Černoch 2015
- Miroslav Lidinský Since 2015
