= 2014 Czech Senate election =

- 10–11 October 2014 (first round); 17–18 October 2014 (second round)
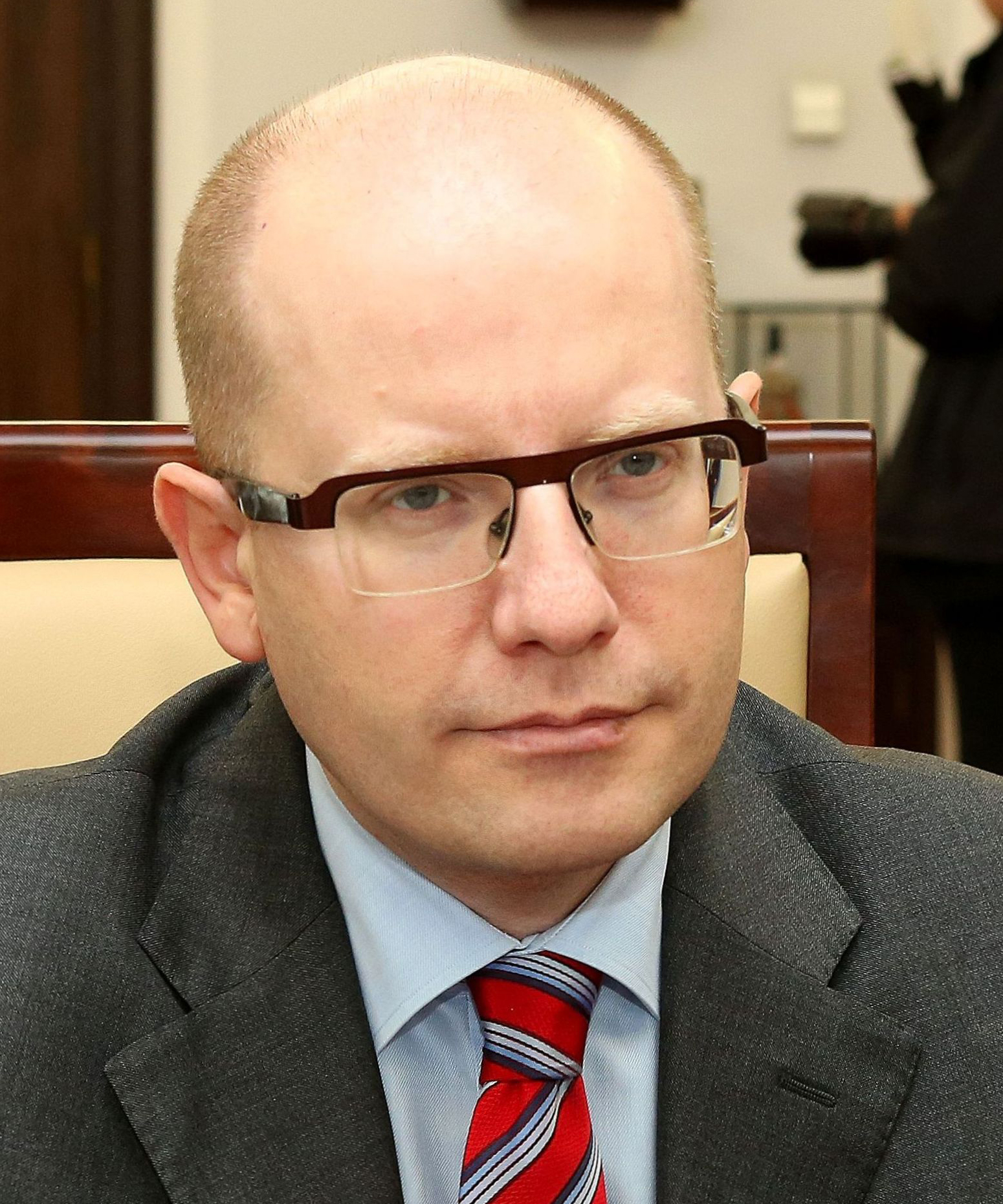

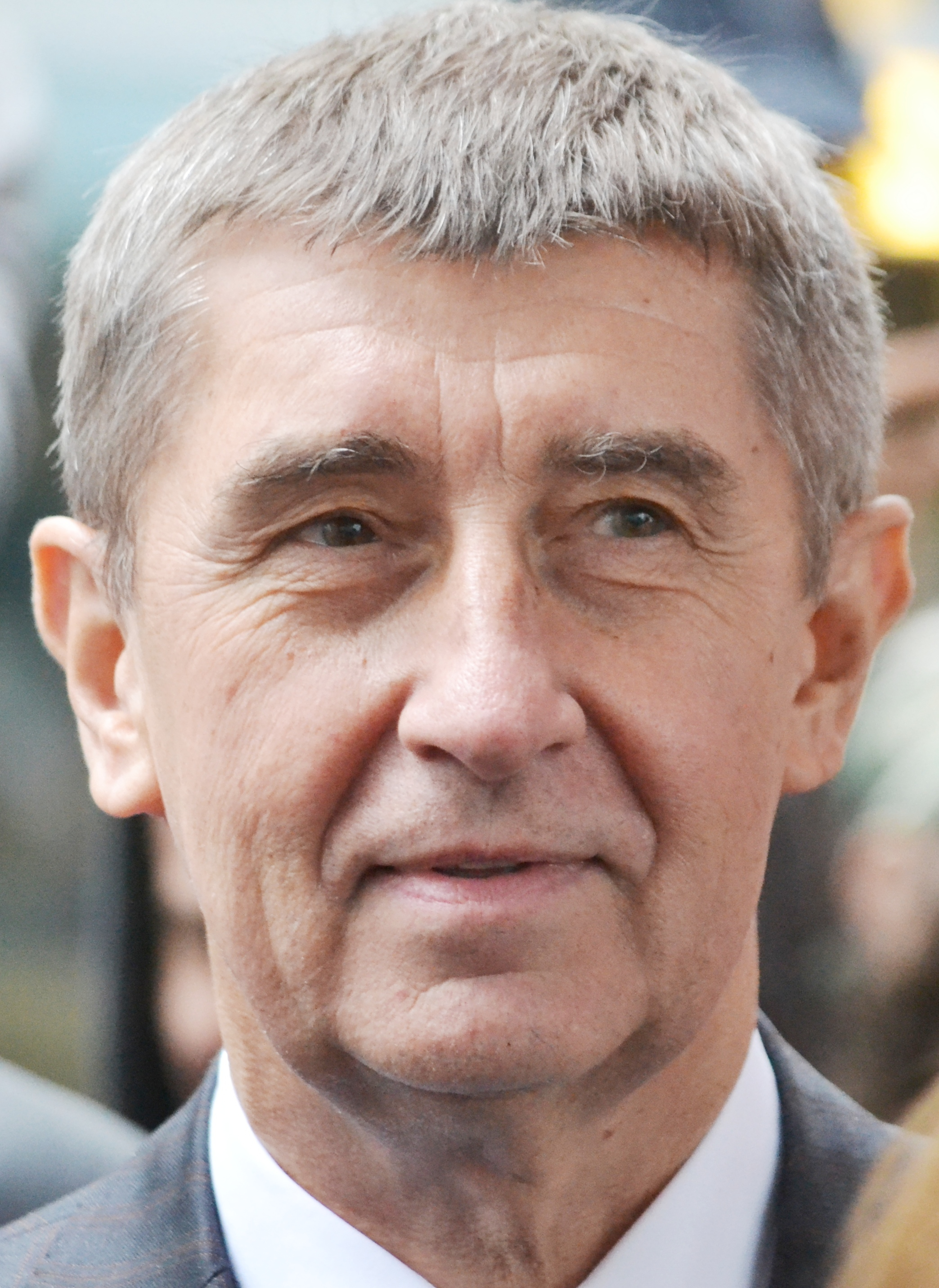

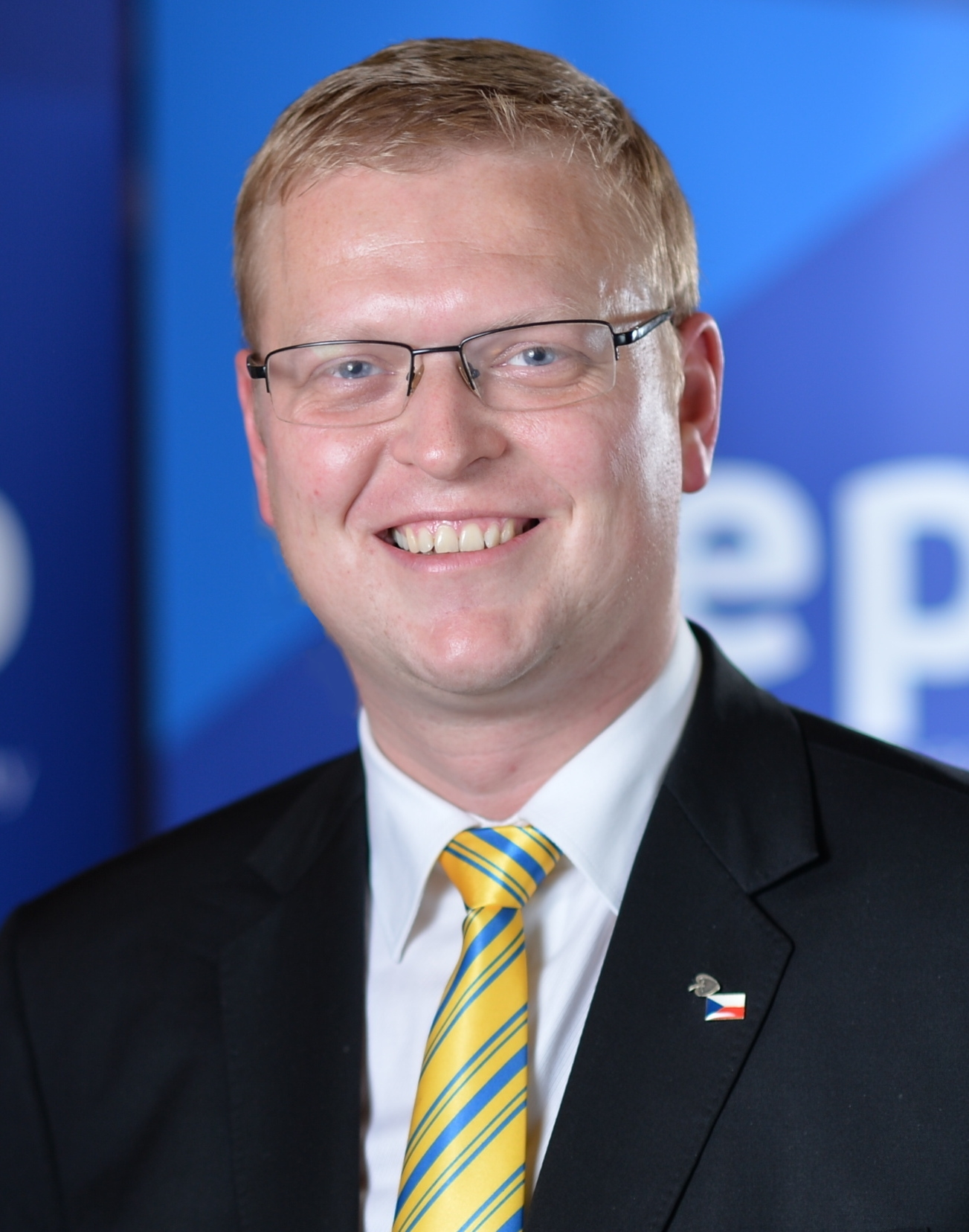

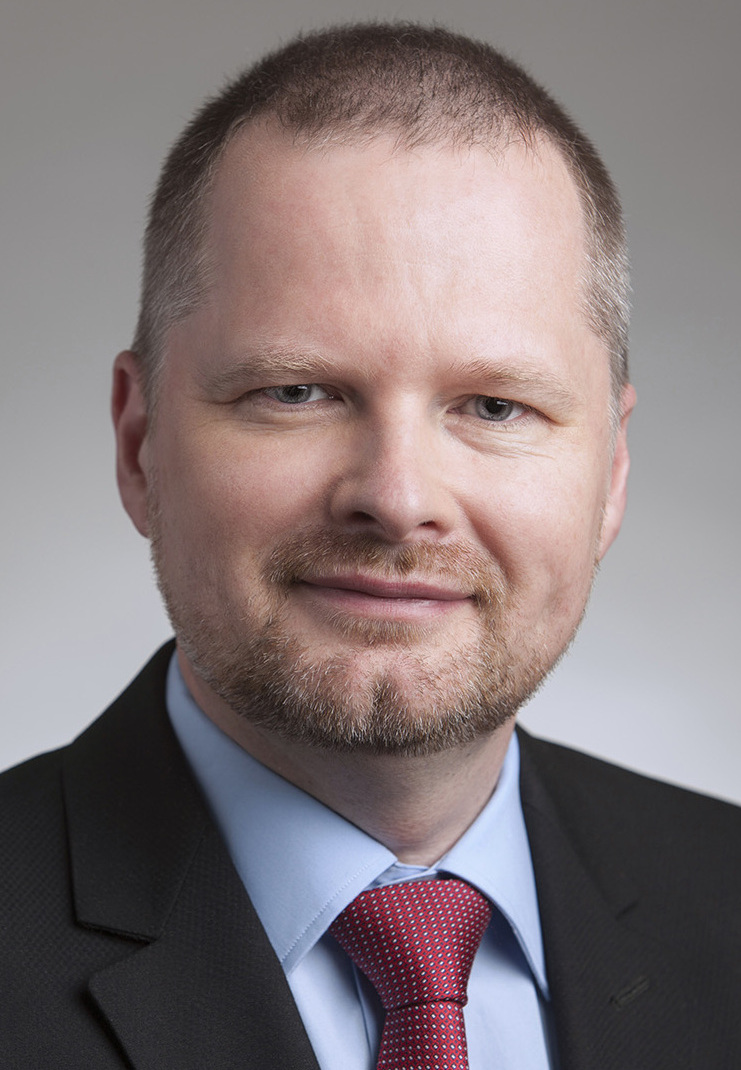

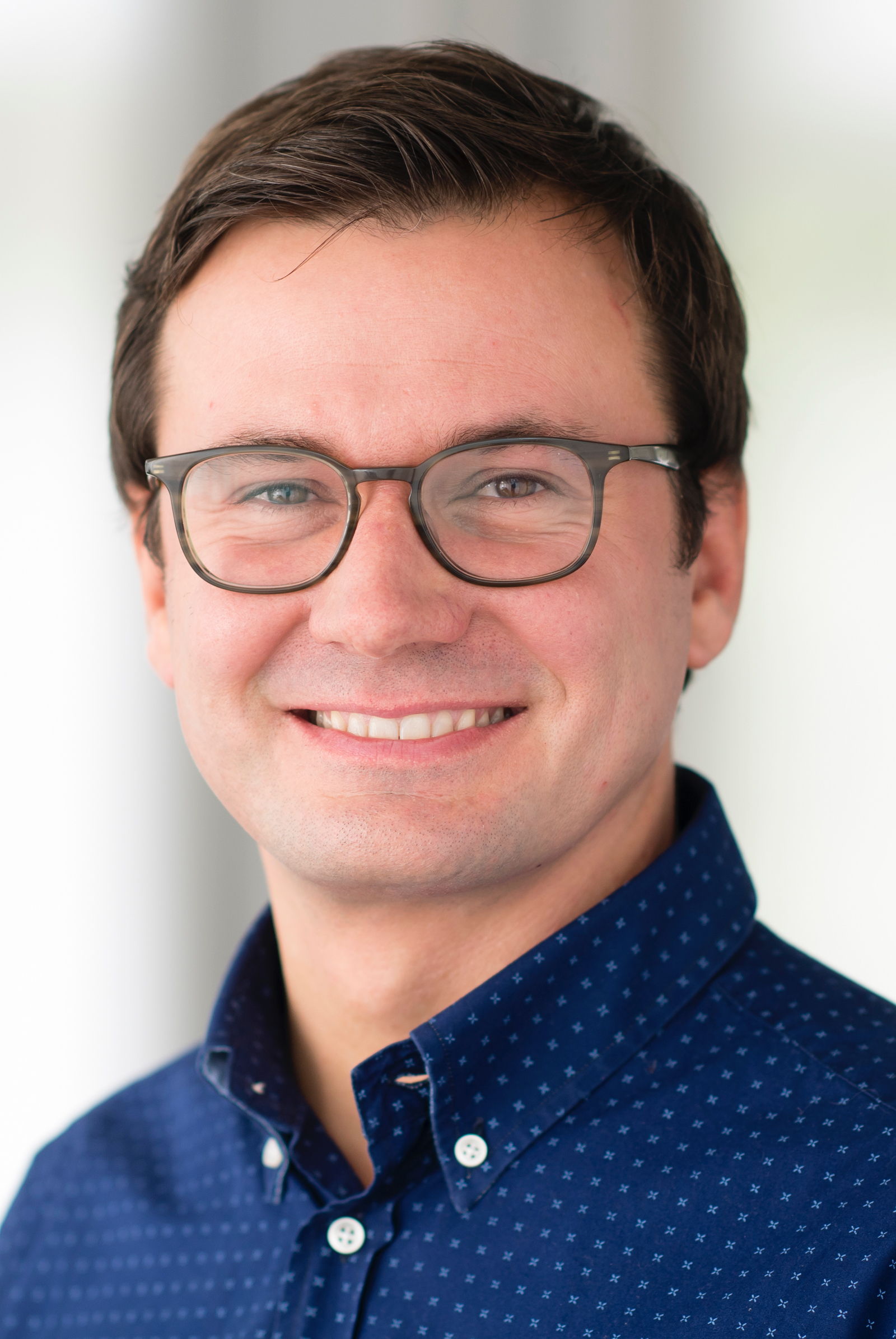
	First party	Second party	Third party
Leader	Bohuslav Sobotka	Andrej Babiš	Pavel Bělobrádek
Party	ČSSD	ANO	KDU-ČSL
Seats won	10	4	5
First round	226,239; 22.04%	180,136; 17.55%	102,898; 10.02%
Second round	165,629; 34.95%	71,739; 15.14%	87,682; 18.50%
	Fourth party	Fifth party
Leader	Petr Fiala	Ondřej Liška
Party	ODS	Greens
Seats won	2	2
First round	118,268; 11.52%	37,078; 3.61%
Second round	53,149; 11.21%	22,275; 4.70%

Senate elections were held in the Czech Republic on 10–11 October 2014, with a second round on 17–18 October 2014. One-third of Senate seats (27 out of 81) were elected, along with approximately 62,300 local council seats. The election date was announced by the President Miloš Zeman in June, 2014.

== Results ==
Map of senate constituencies of the Czech Republic. The 2014 election were held in the constituencies Nos. 3, 6, 9, 12, 15, 18, 21, 24, 27, 30, 33, 36, 39, 42, 45, 48, 51, 54, 57, 60, 63, 66, 69, 72, 75, 78 and 81

Nominating party	First round			Second round			Total seats
Nominating party	Votes	%	Seats	Votes	%	Seats	Total seats
Czech Social Democratic Party	226,239	22.04	0	165,629	34.95	10	10
ANO 2011	180,136	17.55	0	71,739	15.14	4	4
ODS	118,268	11.52	0	53,149	11.21	2	2
KDU-ČSL	102,898	10.02	0	87,682	18.50	5	5
Communist Party of Bohemia and Moravia	99,973	9.74	0				0
TOP 09	87,123	8.49	0	30,476	6.43	0	0
Green Party	37,078	3.61	0	22,275	4.70	2	2
Party of Civic Rights	22,080	2.15	0	11,971	2.53	1	1
Mayors and Independents	20,590	2.01	0	11,099	2.34	1	1
Dawn of Direct Democracy	15,718	1.53	0				0
Party of Free Citizens	14,508	1.41	0				0
Freeholder Party of the Czech Republic	14,071	1.37	0	11,660	2.46	1	1
Republic	9,107	0.89	0				0
Mayors for the Liberec Region	6,633	0.65	0	8,246	1.74	1	1
Czech Pirate Party	5,454	0.53	0				0
Ostravak	4,605	0.45	0				0
Independents	4,390	0.43	0				0
Mayors for Citizens	4,080	0.40	0				0
City for You	3,945	0.38	0				0
HNHRM	3,501	0.34	0				0
Our City F-M	3,356	0.33	0				0
Independent Democrats	3,267	0.32	0				0
Club of Committed Non-Party Members	2,738	0.27	0				0
Civic Conservative Party	2,270	0.22	0				0
iCesko	2,186	0.21	0				0
Tories	1,917	0.19	0				0
Movement of Good Changes	1,742	0.17	0				0
United Democrats – Association of Independents	1,534	0.15	0				0
National Democracy	1,476	0.14	0				0
Bloc against Islamisation – Home Defence	1,172	0.11	0				0
Health, Sports, Prosperity	1,104	0.11	0				0
Conservative Alliance 2014	1,055	0.10	0				0
Conservative Right Party – Council of the Nation	819	0.08	0				0
Ostrava Forum	779	0.08	0				0
Alternative for Plzeň	702	0.07	0				0
Active Independent Citizens	639	0.06	0				0
Solidarity, Homeland and Law	564	0.05	0				0
SNK European Democrats	560	0.05	0				0
ZH	508	0.05	0				0
Party of Common Sense	474	0.05	0				0
HOME	459	0.04	0				0
Citizens of the Czech Republic	457	0.04	0				0
National Socialists – Left of the 21st century	450	0.04	0				0
Anti-Bursik	347	0.03	0				0
State Party Direct Democracy – Labour Party	249	0.02	0				0
Czech Sovereignty	166	0.02	0				0
Independents	15,228	1.48	0				0
Total	1,026,615	100.00	0	473,926	100.00	27	27
Valid votes	1,026,615	95.01		473,926	99.54		
Invalid/blank votes	53,933	4.99		2,176	0.46		
Total votes	1,080,548	100.00		476,102	100.00		
Registered voters/turnout	2,853,106	37.87		2,853,618	16.68		
Source: Volby
