= Milan Štěch =

Czech politician (born 1953)

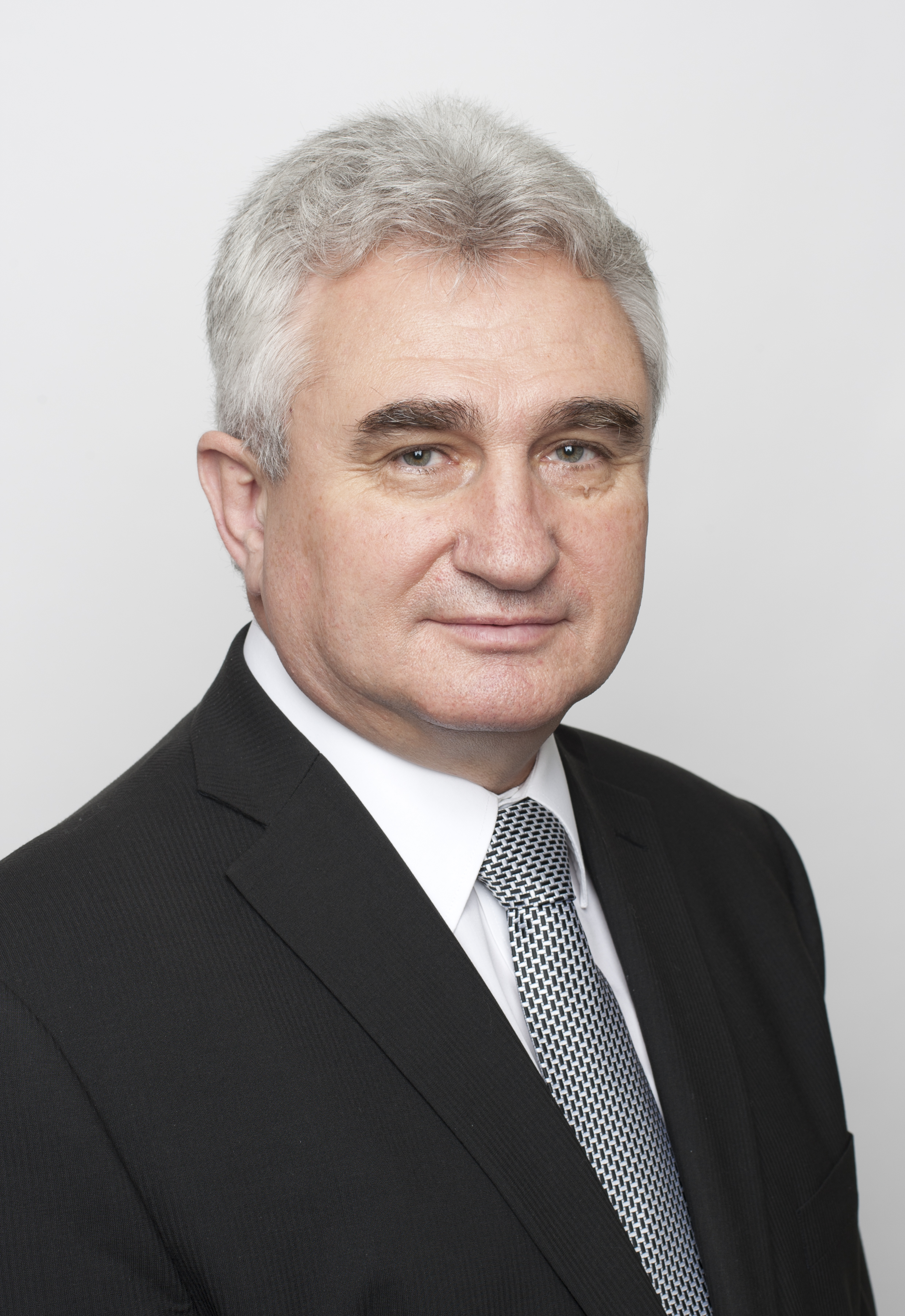

President of the Senate
- In office 24 November 2010 – 14 November 2018
- Preceded by: Přemysl Sobotka
- Succeeded by: Jaroslav Kubera

Vice-President of the Senate of the Czech Republic
- In office 14 November 2018 – 18 October 2020
- In office 26 November 2008 – 24 November 2010

Senator from Pelhřimov
- In office 23 November 1996 – 18 October 2020
- Preceded by: Office established
- Succeeded by: Jaroslav Chalupský

President of the Czech-Moravian Confederation of Trade Unions
- In office 20 April 2002 – 9 April 2010
- Preceded by: Richard Falbr
- Succeeded by: Jaroslav Zavadil

Personal details
- Born: 13 November 1953 (age 72) České Budějovice, Czechoslovakia
- Party: Communist Party (1978–1989); Civic Forum (1989–unknown); Social Democratic Party (1997–present)
- Spouse: wife
- Children: daughter and son
- Profession: politician and trade unionist
- Website: www.milan-stech.cz

Milan Štěch (born 13 November 1953) is a Czech social-democratic politician and former trade union leader. He served as the President of the Senate of the Czech Republic from 2010 to 2018 and was Senator from Pelhřimov from 1996 to 2020. From 2008 to 2010, he served as Vice-President of the Senate. Since 14 November 2018 he has been Vice-President of the Senate of the Czech Republic again.

He was a member of Czechoslovak Communist Party (between 1978 and 1989), Civic Forum (1989–?) and since 1997 he has been a member of Czech Social Democratic Party.
