= List of Czech presidential candidates =

The first Czech presidential election was held in 1993, and elections have been held every five years since. The President was elected indirectly by parliament until the 2013 election and has been elected directly by Czech voters since then.

Year	Candidate	Party	Result
1993	Václav Havel	ODS-KDU–ČSL-ODA	Won the election
1993	Miroslav Sládek	SPR–RSČ	3rd place
1993	Marie Stiborová	KSCM-SDL	2nd place
1998	Stanislav Fischer	KSCM	2nd place
1998	Václav Havel	US-KDU–ČSL-ODA	Won the election
1998	Miroslav Sládek	SPR–RSČ	3rd place
2003	Jaroslav Bureš	ČSSD	3rd place of 1st ballot
2003	Václav Klaus	ODS	Won the election
2003	Miroslav Kříženecký	KSČM	4th place of 1st ballot
2003	Jaroslava Moserová	ODA	2nd place of 2nd ballot
2003	Petr Pithart	KDU–ČSL	2nd place of 1st ballot
2003	Jan Sokol	ČSSD	2nd place of 3rd ballot
2003	Miloš Zeman	ČSSD	3rd place of 2nd ballot
2008	Jana Bobošíková	KSČM	Withdrawn
2008	Václav Klaus	ODS	Won the election
2008	Jan Švejnar	ČSSD	2nd place
2013	Jana Bobošíková	SBB	9th place
2013	Jiří Dienstbier Jr.	ČSSD	4th place
2013	Jan Fischer	Independent	3rd place
2013	Táňa Fischerová	SZ	7th place
2013	Vladimír Franz	Independent	5th place
2013	Zuzana Roithová	KDU–ČSL	6th place
2013	Karel Schwarzenberg	TOP 09	lost in runoff
2013	Přemysl Sobotka	ODS	8th place
2013	Miloš Zeman	SPO	Won the election
2018	Miloš Zeman	SPO	Won the election
2018	Jiří Drahoš	KDU–ČSL-STAN	lost in runoff
2018	Pavel Fischer	Independent	3rd place
2018	Michal Horáček	Independent	4th place
2018	Marek Hilšer	Independent	5th place
2018	Mirek Topolánek	ODS-SsČR	6th place
2018	Jiří Hynek	REAL	7th place
2018	Petr Hannig	Rozumní-ND	8th place
2018	Vratislav Kulhánek	ODA	9th place
2023	Petr Pavel	Independent	Won the election
2023	Andrej Babiš	ANO	lost in runoff
2023	Danuše Nerudová	Independent	3rd place
2023	Pavel Fischer	Independent	4th place
2023	Jaroslav Bašta	SPD	5th place
2023	Marek Hilšer	Independent	6th place
2023	Karel Diviš	Independent	7th place
2023	Tomáš Zima	Independent	8th place
