= President Wanted =

- President Wanted Poster
- Directed by: Tomáš Kudrna
- Produced by: Kateřina Černá, Pavel Strnad (Negativ), Lenka Poláková (Česká televize)
- Music by: Daniel Němec, Marek Hart
- Distributed by: Aerofilms
- Release date: March 21, 2013
- Running time: 109 minutes
- Country: Czech Republic
- Language: Czech
- Box office: $92,223

President Wanted (Czech: Hledá se prezident) is a 2013 Czech documentary film about the first direct presidential election in the Czech Republic. It was directed by Tomáš Kudrna.

President wanted follows candidates from the summer 2012 to January 2013. The film shows candidates behind scenes. The film also shows the most important moments in the campaign. It also follows candidates that didn't qualify for the election

It premiered on 21 March 2013.

== Plot ==
The film starts with introduction of all candidates during Czech Television debate prior the first round. Candidates included Jan Fischer (former caretaker Prime Minister), Miloš Zeman (former Prime Minister), Karel Schwarzenberg (Minister of Foreign Affairs), Jiří Dienstbier Jr. (Social democratic Senator), Vladimír Franz (University professor), Přemysl Sobotka (Senator), Jana Bobošíková (Journalist and leader of Sovereignty – Jana Bobošíková Bloc), Zuzana Roithová (Christian democratic MEP) and Táňa Fischerová (leader of leader of anthroposofic Key Movement). The film then returns to the beginning of the campaign. It shows Independent candidates, like Zeman, Fischer or Franz gathering signatures by citizens that are required to be candidate. Fischer is leading the polls while Zeman is second and Schwarzenberg third but film shows political scientists as they debate that Fischer could easily lose in the first round. As the election approaches, the gap between Zeman and Fischer is reduced and Zeman eventually takes the lead when both candidates duel in debate. On the election day, Zeman wins and qualifies for the second round but Fischer is surprisingly defeated by Schwarzenberg who becomes Zeman's rival. The second round becomes more aggressive when Schwarzenberg says that Czechoslovak president Edvard Beneš would be judged in The Hague for Expulsion of Germans from Czechoslovakia if it happened today. This statement angers Zeman who starts more aggressive campaign against Schwarzenberg while Václav Klaus then expresses his concerns towards Schwarzenberg. Zeman eventually beats Schwarzenberg on election day and becomes new president.

== Appearances ==
- Miloš Zeman
- Karel Schwarzenberg
- Jan Fischer
- Jiří Dienstbier Jr.
- Vladimír Franz
- Zuzana Roithová
- Táňa Fischerová
- Přemysl Sobotka
- Jana Bobošíková
- Vladimír Dlouhý
- Tomio Okamura
- Karel Randák
- Ladislav Jakl
- Filip Renč
- Daniel Hůlka
- Marek Vašut
- Jiří Bláha
- Jiřina Bohdalová

== Reception ==
The film has received mostly positive reviews. It holds 63% on Kinobox. Daniel Stroch of Kulturissimo called President Wanted a solid lecture for memory. He praised that the film shows candidates as normal humans. He also praised that it shows how political campaign works from the inside. Tomáš Kordík also praised the documentary. He noted how it shows candidates and their relationships together and that some of them seemed as friends even though they acted as rivals during the campaign. Daniel Zeman was less positive in is review. He mentioned that the film is actually about Miloš Zeman while other candidates are more "of a supporting cast." He criticised that the crew of the film try to push their opinion about him too much. He also noted that the most interesting materials were cut from the film but stills were used to promote the film.
