= Endorsements in the 2013 Czech presidential election =

This is a list of notable individuals and organizations who voiced their endorsement for the office of the Czech president, including those who subsequently retracted or withheld their endorsement, of any candidate during 2013 Czech presidential election.

== Miloš Zeman ==
=== Political ===
- Marie Benešová, former Supreme prosecutor.
- Jan Fischer, former Prime minister and presidential candidate. He indirectly expressed support for Zeman in the second round.
- Vladimír Franz, presidential candidate. He supported Zeman after the first round.
- Václav Klaus, the incumbent President. He endorsed Zeman for the second round.
- Martin Pecina, former Minister of internal affairs.
- Vladimír Remek, MEP and the first Czech Cosmonaut.
- Jiří Rusnok, former Minister of finances.
- Boris Šťastný, Civic Democratic Party MP.
- Vítězslav Jandák, Czech Social Democratic Party MP.

=== Non-political ===
- Jiřina Bohdalová, actress. She publicly endorsed Zeman in a spot.
- František Ringo Čech, musician, actor and writer.
- Martin Dejdar, actor. He stated that he is Zeman's voter.
- Daniel Hůlka, singer.
- Lukáš Konečný, boxer.
- Blanka Matragi, fashion designer.
- Antonín Panenka, retired football player.
- Filip Renč, director. He endorsed Zeman and directed spots for his campaign.
- Felix Slováček, musician.
- Jarmila Šuláková, singer.
- Marek Vašut, actor.
- Helena Vondráčková, singer. She endorsed Zeman for the second round.

== Karel Schwarzenberg ==
=== Political ===
- Petra Buzková, former politician of Czech Social Democratic Party.
- Ondřej Liška, Green Party politician. Edorsed him for the second round.
- Petr Moos, former minister of traffics.
- Zuzana Roithová, the Christian and Democratic Union – Czechoslovak People's Party nominee. She endorsed Schwarzenberg for the second round.
- Přemysl Sobotka, Senator and the Civic Democratic Party nominee. He endorsed Schwarzenberg for the second round.

=== Non-political ===
- Vojtěch Dyk, singer.
- Marek Eben, moderator.
- Miloš Forman, director.
- Ivan Havel, scientist and brother of Václav Havel.
- Roman Holý, musician.
- Jan Hřebejk, director. Hřebejk eventually endorsed Schwarzenberg.
- Radim Jančura, businessman. Supported Schwarzenberg for second round.
- Richard Krajčo, singer.
- Marta Kubišová, singer.
- Jiří Mádl, actor.
- Jan Pirk, hearth surgeon. He supported Schwarzenberg for the second round
- Bolek Polívka, actor. He originally endorsed Franz but eventually supported Schwarzenberg.
- Anna Polívková, actress. She participated in Schwarzenberg's campaign.
- Viktor Preiss, actor. He stated he will vote for Schwarzenberg.
- Marie Rottrová, singer.
- Petr Rychlý, actor and moderator. He participated in Schwarzenberg's campaign.
- Jan Šibík, photographer.
- Jan Svěrák, director. He helped with Schwarzenberg's campaign.
- Zdeněk Svěrák, actor and writer.
- Magda Vašáryová, Slovak actress and politician.
- Tatiana Vilhelmová, actress.

== Jan Fischer ==
=== Non-political ===
- Patrik Eliáš, Ice hockey player.
- Eva Jiřičná, architect and designer.
- Jan Pirk, hearth surgeon. He supported Fischer in the first round.
- Luděk Sekyra, businessman.

== Vladimír Franz ==
=== Non-political ===
- Bolek Polívka, actor. He endorsed Franz but later changed his mind and supported Schwarzenberg.

== Zuzana Roithová ==
=== Non-political ===
- Jan Graubner, Archbishop of Olomouc.

== Jana Bobošíková ==
=== Non-political ===
- Helena Vondráčková, singer.
