= 2006 President of the Senate of the Czech Republic election =

- 29 November 2006
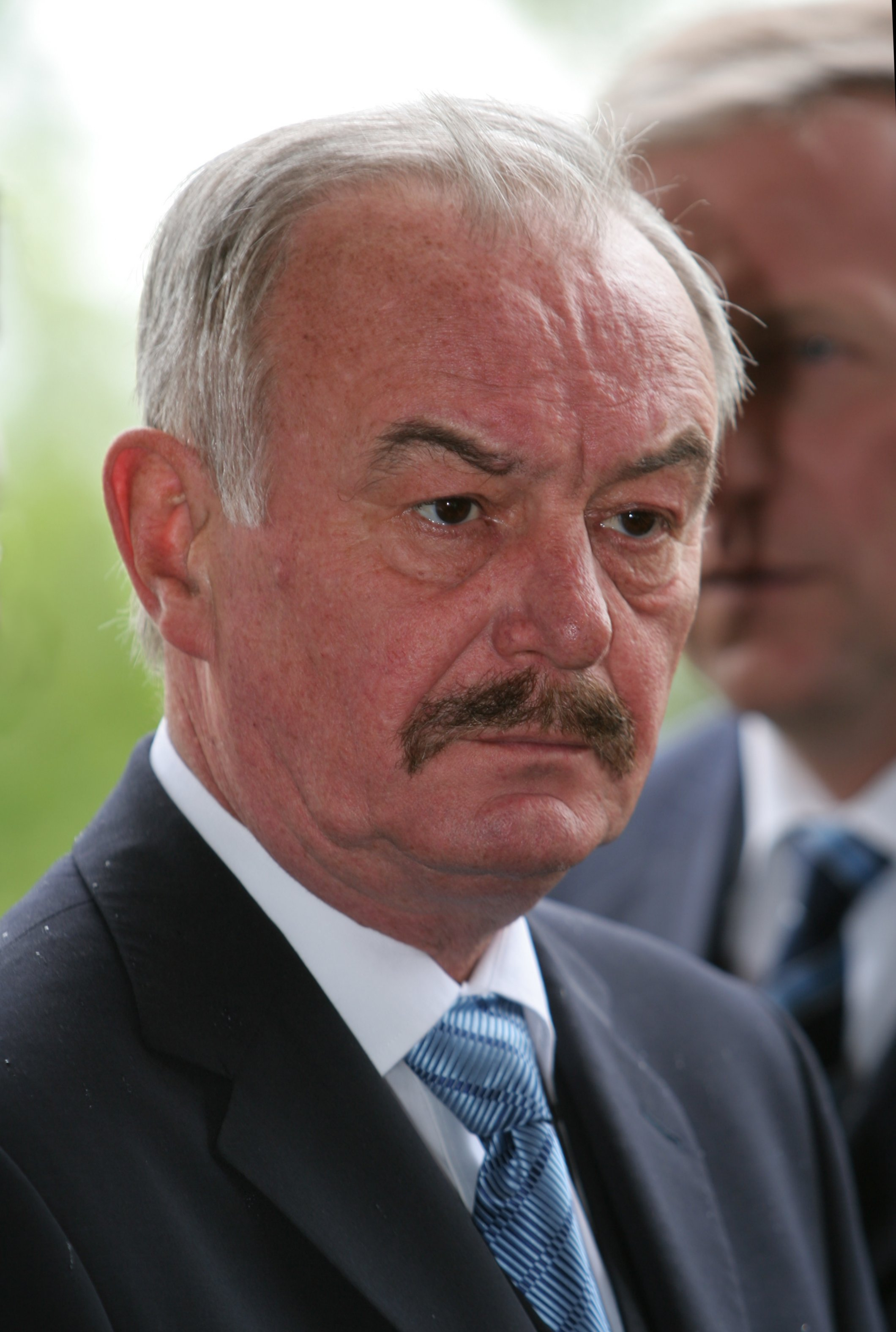
Candidate	Přemysl Sobotka
Party	ODS
Popular vote	74
Percentage	96%
President before election
Přemysl Sobotka
ODS
Elected President
Přemysl Sobotka
ODS

Election of the President of the Senate of the Czech Republic was held on 29 November 2006. Přemysl Sobotka wa reelected for second term.

== Background and voting ==
The Civic Democratic Party has won 2006 Senate election by landslide when won 14 of 27 contested seats. Civic Democrats hold 41 seats. The incumbent Senate President Přemysl Sobotka had strong position for reelection due to the result.

Voting was held on 29 November 2008. Sobotka was the only candidate. 77 senators voted. Sobotka received 74 votes which was 96% and was elected for the second term.
