= 2012 Civic Democratic Party presidential primaries =

30 April - 28 June 2012
- Turnout: 23%
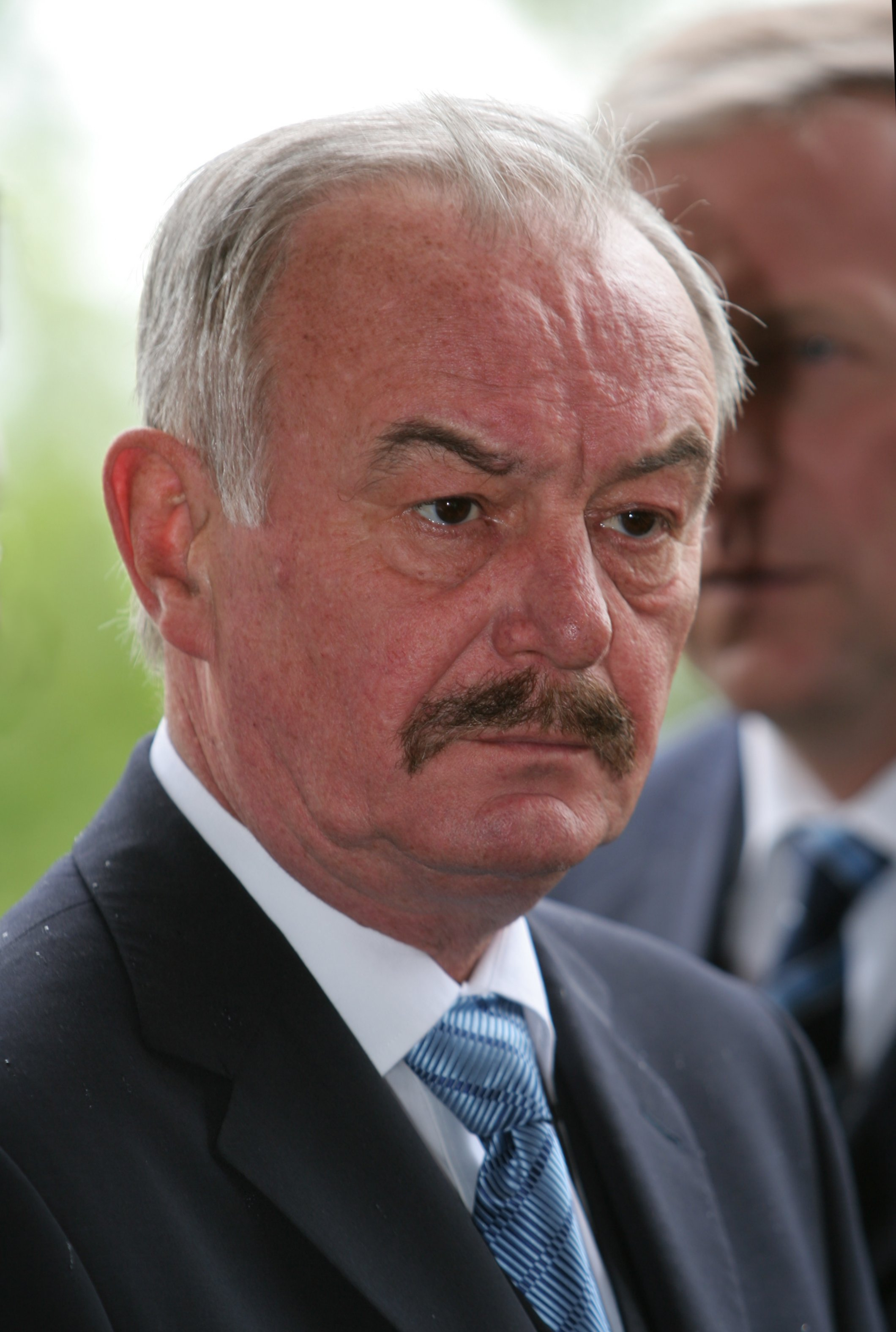

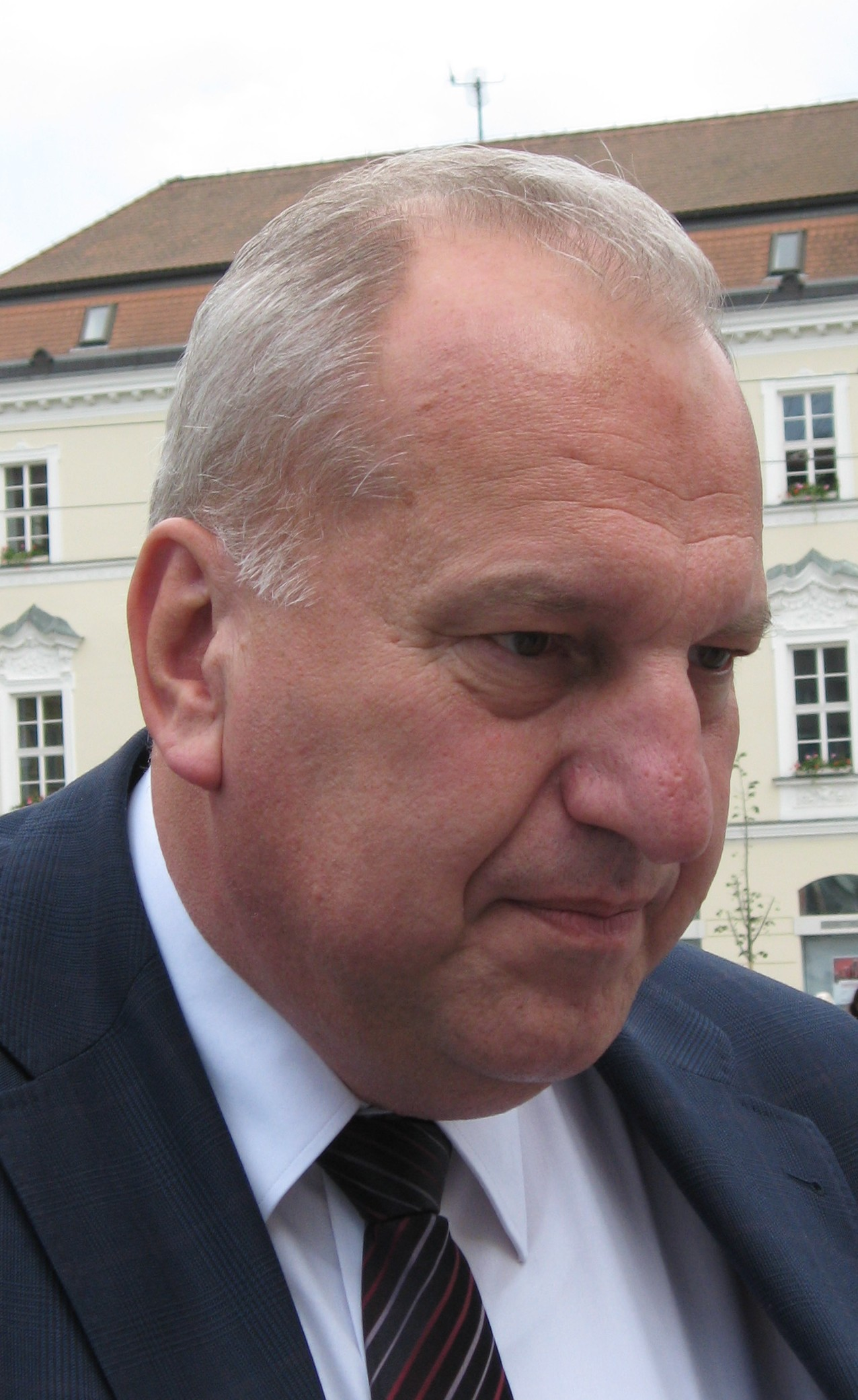
Nominee	Přemysl Sobotka	Evžen Tošenovský
Party	ODS	ODS
Popular vote	3,771	2,432
Percentage	61%	39%

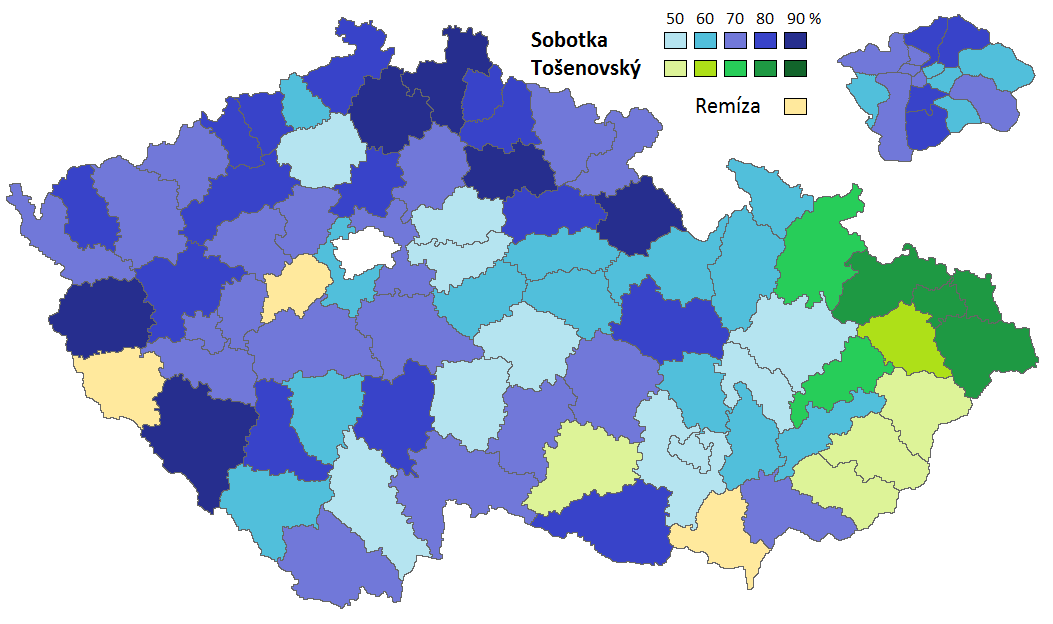
Results by District

Civic Democratic Party presidential primaries, 2012 were held for 2013 Czech presidential election from 30 April to 28. June 2012. They were the first presidential primaries in the Czech Republic. Přemysl Sobotka on the primaries with 61% of votes against 39 votes for the other candidate, Evžen Tošenovský. Primaries suffered for low voter turnout as only 6,203 from 27,000 party members voted.

There were members of ODS who were of opinion that the party should support Miloš Zeman instead of having its own candidate as neither Tošenovský or Sobotka is a strong candidate that can win. It was one of the reasons for a low turnout.

== Candidates ==
- Přemysl Sobotka, a vice-chairman of Senate.
- Evžen Tošenovský, a Member of European Parliament .

=== Declined ===
- Miroslava Němcová, a vice-chairman of Chamber of Deputies was expected to run. She decided to not participate in election. Her decision was speculated to be a result of low performance in opinion polls for presidential election.
- Jaroslav Kubera, senator and mayor of Teplice. He was offered nomination by Ústí nad Labem regional organisation of ODS in April 2012. He declined the offer. He stated that he has too much respect for presidential office to run and that he knows his limits. He ran in senate election instead.
- Tomáč Töpfer, an actor and former senator. Some members of party offered him support but he declined. "I would run only if some Neo-Nazi threatens democracy."
- Cyril Höschl, a psychiatrist. He decided to not participate as he is responsible for too many other projects.

== Debates ==
The first debate was held on 3 May 2012. Debate was very calm and without confrontation. Sobotka only criticised presidential front-runner Jan Fischer. He said that Fischer is popular because he wasn't brave to make any important decision as Prime Minister. Tošenovský said that wants to be a similar president to Václav Klaus.

== Support of candidates in opinion polls ==
Date	Agency	Miroslava Němcová	Přemysl Sobotka	Evžen Tošenovský
14–21 January 2012	Sanep	7.6%	2.8%	<1.8%
23 February - 2 March 2012	PPM Factum	6.9%	3.2%	—
23 March - 3 April 2012	PPM Factum	5.6%	<3.0%	<3.0%
14 April 2012	Median	2.5%	4.0%	3.5%
8 May 2012	Median	—	3.5%	5.0%
30 May - 6 June 2012	Sanep	—	2.9%	1.4%

== Voting ==
Voting took place in 9 election regions (each consisted of one or two Regions). Every member of Civic Democratic Party could participate if he joined party at least 60 days prior the beginning of primaries.

Voting started in Hradec Králové Region and Pardubice Region. Sobotka received 404 votes and Tošenovský 141. Přemysla Sobotka was reported to be surprised by results. Sobotka commented results: "Competition has only just started, but this victory is a good impulse to me for other rounds of primaries." Voter turnout was low with 30%.

Another voting took place in Olomouc Region and Zlín Region. Sobotka narrowly won in Olomouc region by 1 vote while Tošenovský narrowly won Zlín region by two votes. Overall results in Central Moravia were victory for Evžen Tošenovský who won by 1 vote. Sobotka considered this result a success as the voting took place in Tošenovský's territory. Sobotka was still ahead after voting in Central Moravia.

Another round took place in South Bohemia and in Vysočina Region. Sobotka won when he received 409 votes while Tošenovský received only 215 votes. Sobotka overall received 1,101 votes and Tošenovský 654 votes by the moment.

Sobotka also won voting in West Bohemia. More decisive victory was in Karlovy Vary region where Sobotka received 75% of votes. Voter turnout in region was only 19.3%. Sobotka was leading the overall primaries with 1,523 votes (66%) while Tošenovský had only 794 votes (34%).

Next voting took place in North Bohemia - in Sobotka's home region. Sobotka decisively won the voting with 722 votes while Tošenovský had only 170 votes. Sobotka widened his lead to more than 70% of votes in overall voting. Some reported that the most populous regions were ahead so the battle might not be over.

Moravian-Silesian Region where another voting took place is home region of Evžen Tošenovský. Tošenovský admitted that he is more nervous in this region than he was in the previous ones as there are more people who know him. Tošenovský won the region with 895 votes while Sobotka received only 229 votes. Voter turnout was higher than in other regions (46%). Sobotka was still leading with 2,474 votes (57%). Tošenovský had 1,895 votes (43%)

Sobotka won primaries in Central Bohemia. He received 425 votes while Tošenovský only 168. Sobotka widened his lead. He was winning nationally with 2,899 votes (59%).

Sobotka received 543 votes in Prague while Tošenovský only 181 votes. Sobotka was nationally winning with 3,442 votes, while Tošenovský had 2,208. Prague primaries also suffered of low turnout.

Last primaries were held in South Moravia. Sobotka received 329 votes and Tošenovský only 224. Sobotka won whole primaries and won party's nomination for president. Party's leader Petr Nečas praised the result and called Sobotka qualified and honest candidate who has clear opinion and isn't populist.

=== Results ===
Dates	Electoral Region	Přemysl Sobotka	Evžen Tošenovský	Turnout
30 April - 5 May	East (Hradec Králové Region, Pardubice Region)	404	141	30.5%
7–12 May	Centre (Olomouc Region, Zlín Region)	294	295	26.6%
14–19 May	South (Vysočina Region, South Bohemian Region)	409	215	25.5%
21–26 May	West (Plzeň Region, Karlovy Vary Region)	416	143	19.3%
28 May - 2 June	North (Ústí nad Labem Region, Liberec Region)	722	170	29.5%
4–9 June	Moravian-Silesian Region	229	895	46%
11–16 June	Central Bohemian Region	425	168	24%
18–23 June	Prague	543	181	24%
25–28 June	South Moravian Region	329	224	
30 April - 28 June	Czech Republic	3771	2432	23%

== Aftermath ==
Sobotka participated in 2013 Czech presidential election but received only 2.46% of votes. It was considered a devastating defeat. Some Journalists called the result "Blue Waterloo."

== See also ==
- Civic Democratic Party (Czech Republic)
- 2013 Czech presidential election
- Primary election
