= Vladimír Dlouhý =

Vladimír Dlouhý may refer to:

- Vladimír Dlouhý (politician) (born 1953)
- Vladimír Dlouhý (actor) (1958–2010)
