= Opinion polling for the 2008 Czech presidential election =

This page lists nationwide public opinion polls that have been conducted relating to the 2008 presidential elections in the Czech Republic.

Even though the election was indirect, there were numerous polls. The STEM agency made polls on ČSSD request while SC&C on ODS request. This cast their polls into doubt.

== Polls ==
=== Klaus vs Švejnar ===
Date	Agency	Václav Klaus Civic Democratic	Jan Švejnar Social Democratic	Leading by %
7 February 2008	SC&C	53.0%	47.0%	6.0%
6 February 2008	CVVM	38.0%	38.0%	tie
5 February 2008	SC&C	57.0%	43.0%	14%
5 February 2008	STEM	45.0%	55.0%	10.0%
3 February 2008	Palacký University	52.2%	47.8%	4.4%
30 January 2008	iDnes	53.3%	46.7%	6.3%
28 January 2008	Palacký University	51.2%	48.8%	2.4%
28 January 2008	SC&C	57.0%	43.0%	14%
28 January 2008	Median	59.0%	41%	18%
27 January 2008	STEM	48.0%	52.0%	4.0%
25 January 2008	Palacký University	51.2%	48.8%	2.4%
25 January 2008	STEM	48.0%	52.0%	4.0%
21 January 2008	Palacký University	51.4%	48.6%	2.8%
20 January 2008	Palacký University	53.0%	47.0%	6%
14 January 2008	Palacký University	51.0%	49.0%	2%
13 January 2008	Palacký University	55.0%	45.0%	10%
26 November 2007	SC&C	63.0%	37.0%	26%
10 November 2007	Median	43%	28%	14%

=== Other polls ===
Date	Agency	Václav Klaus Civic Democratic	Petr Pithart Christian Democratic	Jiří Dienstbier Social Democratic	Jan Švejnar Social Democratic	Václav Pačes Communist	Leading by %
September - October 2007	Median	57%	8.3%	6.7%	4.4%	4.4%	48.7%

=== Klaus's Second term ===
This lists polls that asked people if they want Václav Klaus as president for Second term.

Date	Agency	For	Against
19 October 2007	STEM	66%	34%
23 April 2007	STEM	58%	41%
28 February 2007	SC&C	67%	33%

== Media surveys ==
=== Klaus vs Dienstbier vs Švejnar ===
Date	Agency	Jiří Dienstbier Social Democratic	Václav Klaus Civic Democratic	Jan Švejnar Social Democratic	Leading by %
June 2007 - 1 February 2008	Aktuálně.cz	42.1%	41.6%	16.3%	0.5%
