= 2013 Czech presidential election =

- 11–12 January 2013 (first round); 25–26 January 2013 (second round)
- Turnout: 61.27% (first round); 59.08% (second round)
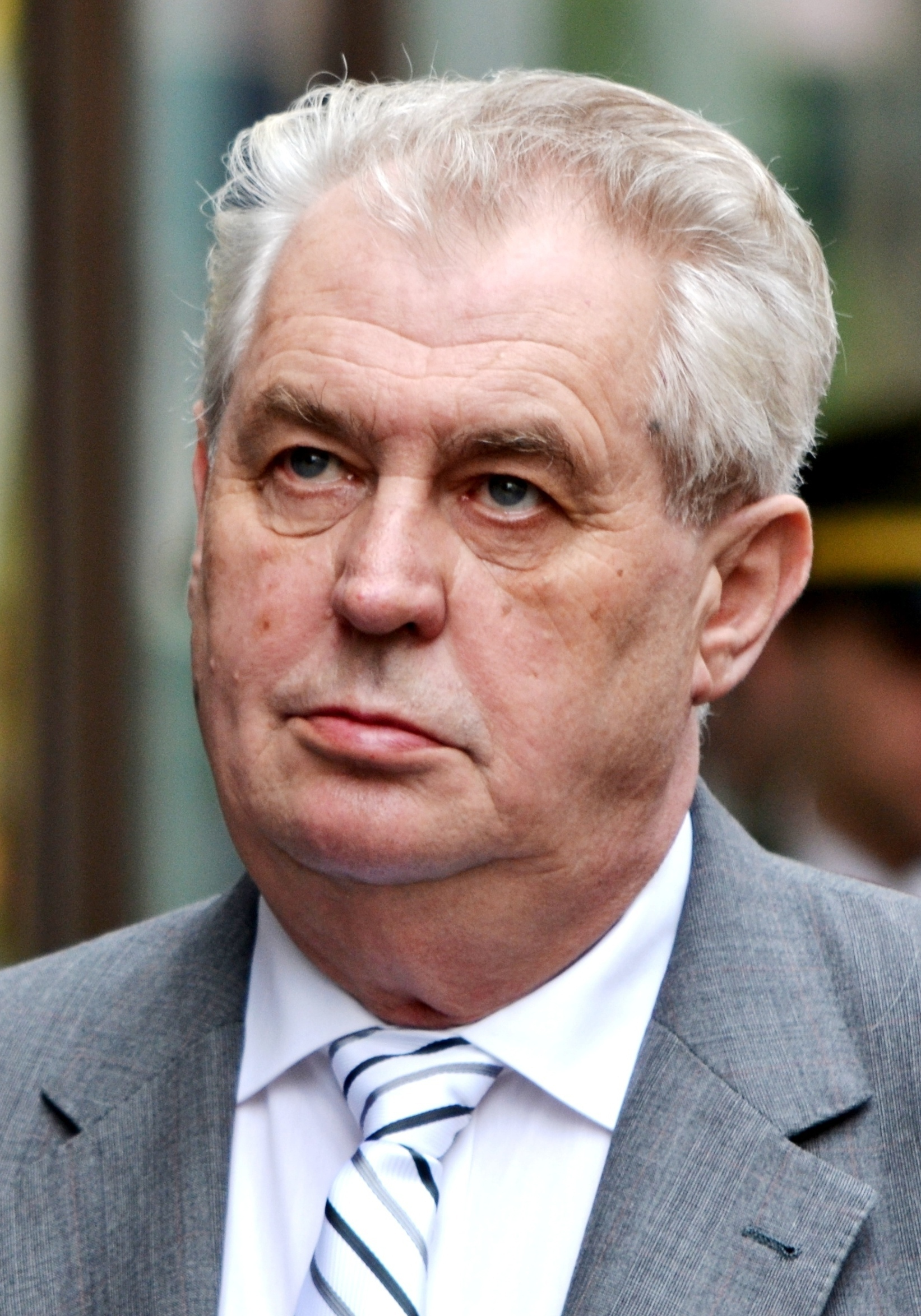

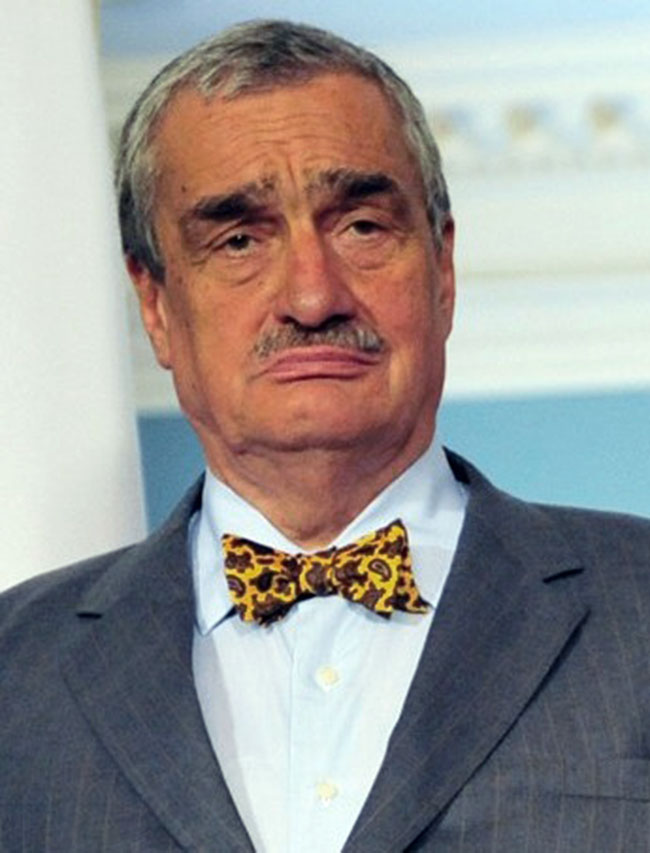
Candidate	Miloš Zeman	Karel Schwarzenberg
Party	SPO	TOP 09
Popular vote	2,717,405	2,241,171
Percentage	54.80%	45.20%
President before election
Václav Klaus
Independent
Elected President
Miloš Zeman
SPO

Presidential elections were held in the Czech Republic in January 2013, the country's first direct election for the presidency. No candidate received a majority of the votes in the first round on 11–12 January, so a second round runoff election was held on 25–26 January. Nine individuals secured enough signatures or support of parliamentarians to become official candidates for the office. Miloš Zeman of the Party of Civic Rights (SPOZ) and Karel Schwarzenberg of TOP 09 qualified for the second round, which was won by Zeman with 54.8% of the vote, compared to Schwarzenberg's 45.2%. Zeman assumed office in March 2013 after being sworn in.

== Background ==
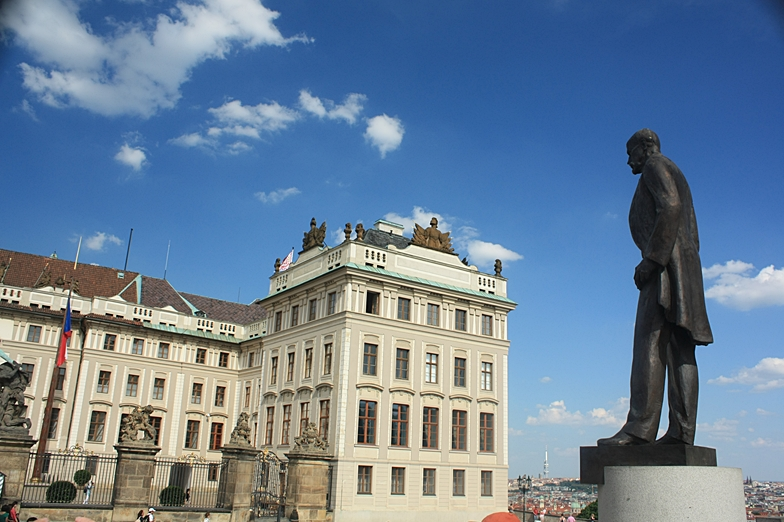
The Prague Castle, official residence of the Czech President, behind the statue of Tomáš Garrigue Masaryk, the first President of Czechoslovakia

After the dissolution of Czechoslovakia and the adoption of a new constitution in 1992, the president was indirectly elected by a joint session of the Chamber of Deputies and the Senate of the Czech Republic. The possibility of a directly elected president was controversial because of concerns that it could weaken a government under the prime minister. The 2008 presidential election, which narrowly reelected Václav Klaus after several attempts, however was criticized for the appearance of political deal-making and allegations of corruption. Prime Minister Petr Nečas subsequently put the issue of a directly elected president in his three-party coalition agreement when he formed his government in 2010, in part because of demands by the TOP 09 party, and the Public Affairs and Mayors and Independents parties. Several outspoken opponents of the change however came from the Prime Minister's own Civic Democratic Party.

In September 2011, an amendment was submitted to the Chamber of Deputies for a second official reading, during which the Communist Party (KSČM) tried to reject the bill by sending it back into the review process, but the Czech Social Democratic Party (ČSSD), also part of the opposition, did not support the Communists' motion, and allowed the bill to go ahead with certain changes, including limits on presidential power and penal immunity. On 14 December 2011, the Chamber of Deputies passed the constitutional amendment for direct elections by a vote of 159 out of 192. This was then sent to the Senate, which passed the amendment on 8 February 2012 after five hours of debate by a majority of 49 of 75. The Chief Justice of the Constitutional Court, Pavel Rychetský, criticized the bill's method in which a constitutional amendment was in effect added, though without changing the original text of the constitution, and while leaving the election open to legal and constitutional challenges.

In June 2012 an implementation bill for holding the election passed in the Chamber of Deputies, and in July in the Senate. Though constitutional amendments do not require presidential approval, and cannot be vetoed, President Václav Klaus did need to sign or veto the implementation bill; a refusal could have halted the constitutional changes. Klaus opposed the measure, though saying it was a "fatal mistake" as the country was not ready for such a move. He however signed the law on 1 August 2012. The law was scheduled to take effect on 1 October 2012, after which Senate President Milan Štěch was due to set a date for the election, following discussions with the Ministry of the Interior.

The two-day first round was on 11–12 January 2013. However, because no one secured an absolute majority, a run-off round was held on 25–26 January 2013. Candidates were allowed to spend up to Kč40 million in the first round and Kč10 million in the second round. Each candidate had an election committee that manages campaign funding, which should be run through a special account. All anonymous campaigns contributions were banned.

== Candidates ==
In order to be a candidate, an individual needs to gather 50,000 signatures from citizens or the support of twenty deputies or ten senators. The candidates were bound to file their applications with the signatures sixty-six days before the election; following which the Interior Ministry verified a sampling of the signatures.

The Civic Democratic Party (ODS) held primary elections in July 2012 to choose their candidate, selecting former president of the Senate Přemysl Sobotka over MEP Evžen Tošenovský. SPOZ, TOP 09, and Sovereignty have their party leaders running for the post. Jan Švejnar, who ran for the presidency in 2008 against Václav Klaus, declined to run in order to support Jan Fischer's candidacy.

=== Confirmed candidates ===
Candidate name and age, (Note: Inauguration day is set as the last possible date for person to become President.) political party	Office(s) held	Details
Zuzana Roithová (60); Christian and Democratic Union – Czechoslovak People's Party	Minister of Health (1998) Other offices: Member of the European Parliament from 2006 to 2009; Senator from 1998 to 2004	Running with number 1 and with support of 75,066 signatures from public.
Jan Fischer (62); Independent	Prime Minister (2009–2010) Other offices: President of the Czech Statistical Office from 2003 to 2010	Running with number 2 and with support of 77,387 signatures from public.
Jana Bobošíková (48); Sovereignty – Jana Bobošíková Bloc	Member of the European Parliament (2004–2009)	Running with number 3 and with support of 50,810 signatures from public.
Táňa Fischerová (65); Key Movement with Green Party support	Leader of Key Movement (2008–2018) Other offices: Member of the Chamber of Deputies from 2002 to 2006	Running with number 4 and with support of 64,961 signatures from public.
Přemysl Sobotka (68); Civic Democratic Party	President of the Senate (2004–2010) Other offices: Senator from 1996 to 2016	Running with number 5 and with support of 51 deputies.
Miloš Zeman (68); Party of Civic Rights	Prime Minister (1998–2002) Other offices: President of the Chamber of Deputies from 1996 to 1998; Leader of the Social Democratic Party from 1993 to 2001; Member of the Chamber of Deputies from 1996 to 2002	Running with number 6 and with support of 82,856 signatures from public.
Vladimír Franz (53); Independent	None	Running with number 7 and with support of 75,709 signatures from public.
Jiří Dienstbier Jr. (43); Czech Social Democratic Party	Senator (2011–2020) Other offices: Leader of Young Social Democrats from 2000 to 2002; Member of the Chamber of Deputies in 2011; Member of the Federal Assembly from 1990 to 1992	Running with number 8 and with support of 27 senators.
Karel Schwarzenberg (75); TOP 09	Minister of Foreign Affairs (2007–2009; 2010–2013) Other offices: Leader of TOP 09 from 2009 to 2015; Member of the Chamber of Deputies since 2010; Senator from 2004 to 2010	Running with number 9 and with support of 38 deputies.

Vladimír Franz appears insignificant in agency surveys but in November he was the obvious favorite of opinion polls of several different popular news servers and media (Aktuálně.cz, Reflex, iDnes.cz) as well as of so-called "students' elections" in all regions and all types of secondary schools. The current president Klaus expressed fear that his successor would be Franz or Okamura.

=== Disqualified candidates ===
The following list includes the candidates who were disqualified after the Ministry of Interior reviewed their petitions assessing that they failed to meet the quorum of minimum of 50,000 popular signatures or twenty MPs in the Chamber of Deputies, or ten MPs in the Senate.

Candidates Jana Bobošíková, Vladimír Dlouhý, and Tomio Okamura collected more than 50,000 signatures; however, after checking two samples of each petition and reducing the number of signatures according to the error rate, the number fell below the requirement; accordingly, they were not registered as candidates. Along with the action, the ministry stated that many of Bobošíková's alleged signatories were long dead; while in case of Okamura, the ministry found a large number of fictitious signatories. Both candidates appealed the ministry's decision before the Supreme Administrative Court, believing that the ministry had used an incorrect method of recount.

On 13 December 2012, the Supreme Administrative Court ruled on the complaints. It ordered that Bobošíková must be registered as a candidate, and rejected the complaints of Dlouhý and Okamura, as even after correcting the error in computation their number of valid signatures still fails to meet the quorum. Okamura unsuccessfully challenged the verdict at the Constitutional Court.

Candidate	Signatures lodged	Quorum fulfillment after recount	Party	Affiliation prior to the Velvet Revolution	Occupation	PPM Factum Opinion poll 27 August 2012	PPM Factum Opinion poll 6–16 Sep 2012	PPM Factum Opinion Poll 15 Oct 2012
Vladimír Dlouhý	59 165	38 687	Independent, formerly Civic Democratic Alliance and Civic Forum	Communist Party of Czechoslovakia	Economist, former Minister of Industry and Trade	N/A	4.5%	2.8%
Tomio Okamura	61 966	35 751	Independent	None	Entrepreneur, Senator	7.3%	6.1%	7.9%
Klára Samková	1 076	–	TOP 09, formerly member of Civic Democratic Party, formerly candidate of the Romany Civic Initiative within Civic Forum	–	Attorney, former Member of Chamber of Deputies of the Czech Parliament	–	–	–
Petr Cibulka	319	–	The Right Bloc	Dissident	Civic activist	–	–	–
Jiří Kesner	54	–	Independent	–	engineer	–	–	–
Karel Světnička	26	–	Independent	–	state inspector	–	–	–
Anna Kašná	unsuccessfully required parliament support	–	The Crown of Bohemia (Monarchist party of Bohemia, Moravia and Silesia)	–	jurist, (wheelchair user)	–	–	–
Iveta Heimová	unsuccessfully required parliament support	–	Independent	–	teacher and artist	–	–	–
Jindřiška Nazarská	60	–	member of Civic Democratic Party	–	teacher and artist	–	–	–
Roman Hladík	18	–	Independent	–	self-employed	–	–	–

=== Withdrawn candidate ===
Jan Toman from Bechyně filed his own candidature on 6 November but he attached no petition. He was also the attorney of the candidate Karel Světnička, and Karel Světnička was the attorney of Jan Toman. However, a candidate must not be an attorney of any proposer. Jan Světnička surrendered his own candidature on 22 November and remained the attorney of Karel Světnička.

=== Other announced candidates ===
The following list includes some of the people who announced their candidacy but the proposal was not filed finally. Some of them started to collect petition signatures.

- Ladislav Jakl, Party of Free Citizens, secretary to President Václav Klaus. He won the party's primaries but failed to gather enough signatures.
- Rut Kolínská, President of the Mother Centres Network
- Karel Randák, former head of the Czech counter-intelligence
- Tomáš Vandas, DSSS

=== Other possible candidates ===
Jan Švejnar a candidate in 2008 presidential election was speculated to be one of possible candidates and he himself admitted that he considers running. He quickly one of the frontrunners according to polls that showed him being the 2nd strongest candidate. His support decreased by the time and he fell to 3rd or 4th place. Švejnar eventually said in September 2012 that he won't run.

Vladimír Remek was offered presidential nomination by Communist Party of Bohemia and Moravia. He rejected his own party's offer.

== Primaries ==
=== Civic Democratic Party (ODS) ===
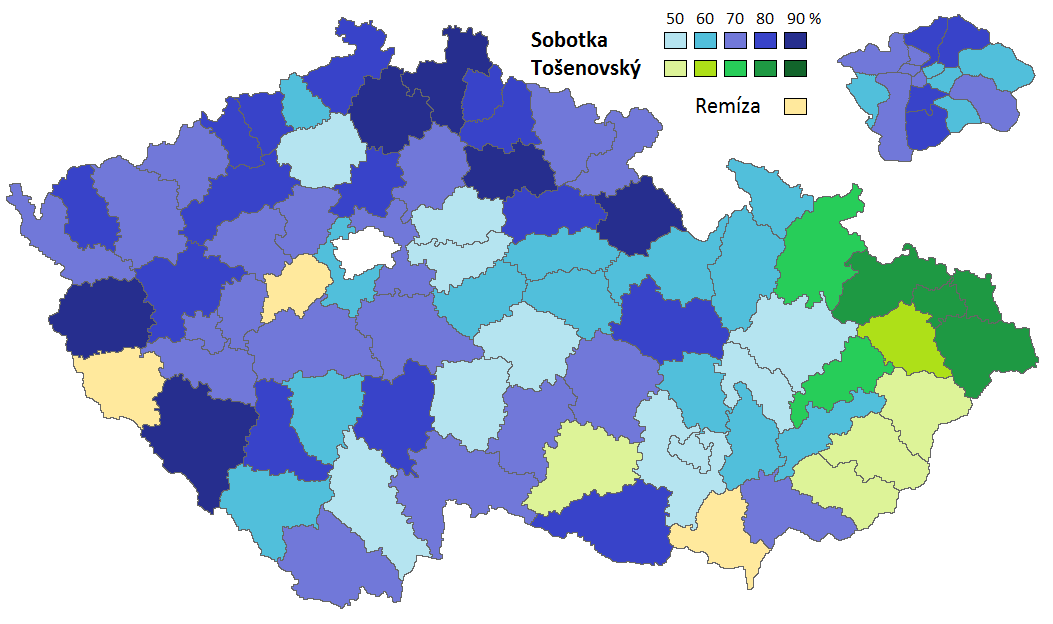
ODS Primaries results by districts

Civic Democratic Party held primary elections to decide who will become party's candidate. Primaries were held from end of April 2012 to 28 June 2012. Vice-Chairman of Senate Přemysl Sobotka faced MEP Evžen Tošenovský. Sobotka received 61% of votes and won party's nomination. Primaries suffered of low voter turnout.

=== Czech Social Democratic Party (ČSSD) ===
Czech Social Democratic Party held primaries in May 2012. The primaries were indirect, with only members of the party's Central Executive Committee able to vote. Jiří Dienstbier Jr. was expected to face Jan Švejnar. Švejnar withdrawn from primaries before voting took place and Dienstbier received the nomination on 19 May 2012.

=== Party of Free Citizens (Svobodní) ===
The Party of Free Citizens held presidential primaries in June 2012. Ladislav Jakl, the secretary of President Václav Klaus, was the only candidate. Jakl received 88% of votes and won the nomination but the party failed to gather enough signatures and Jakl could not participate in the election.

=== Public Affairs (VV) ===
Public Affairs also intended to choose its candidate in presidential primaries. Jan Švejnar was mentioned by Vít Bárta as a possible candidate. Švejnar himself didn't say that he would agree with nomination by the party. Leader of Public Affairs Radek John said that he would support Jan Fischer. Primaries never happened and Tomio Okamura was later speculated to be possible candidate of Public Affairs.

== Campaign ==
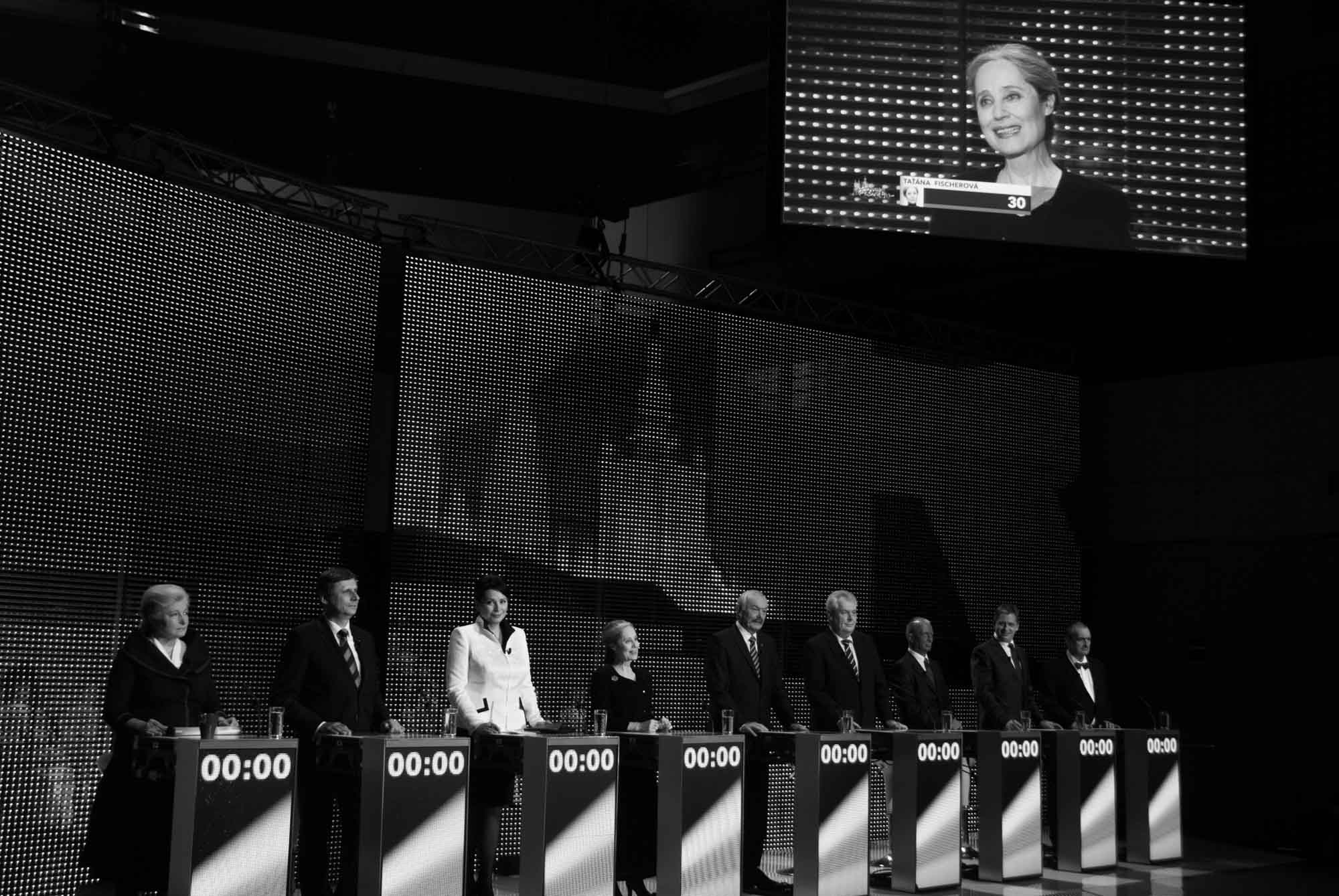
Presidential debate on Czech Television (ČT)

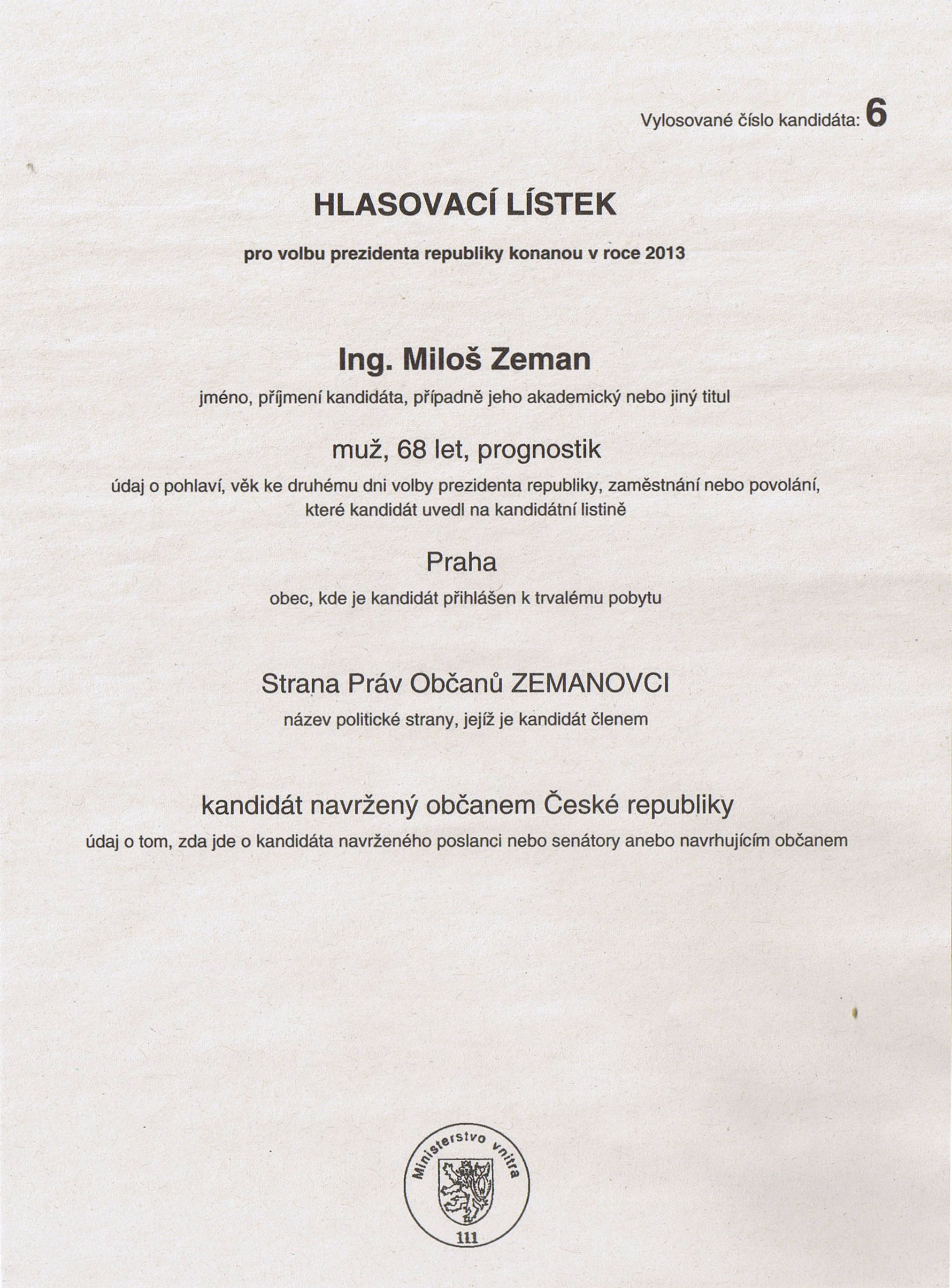
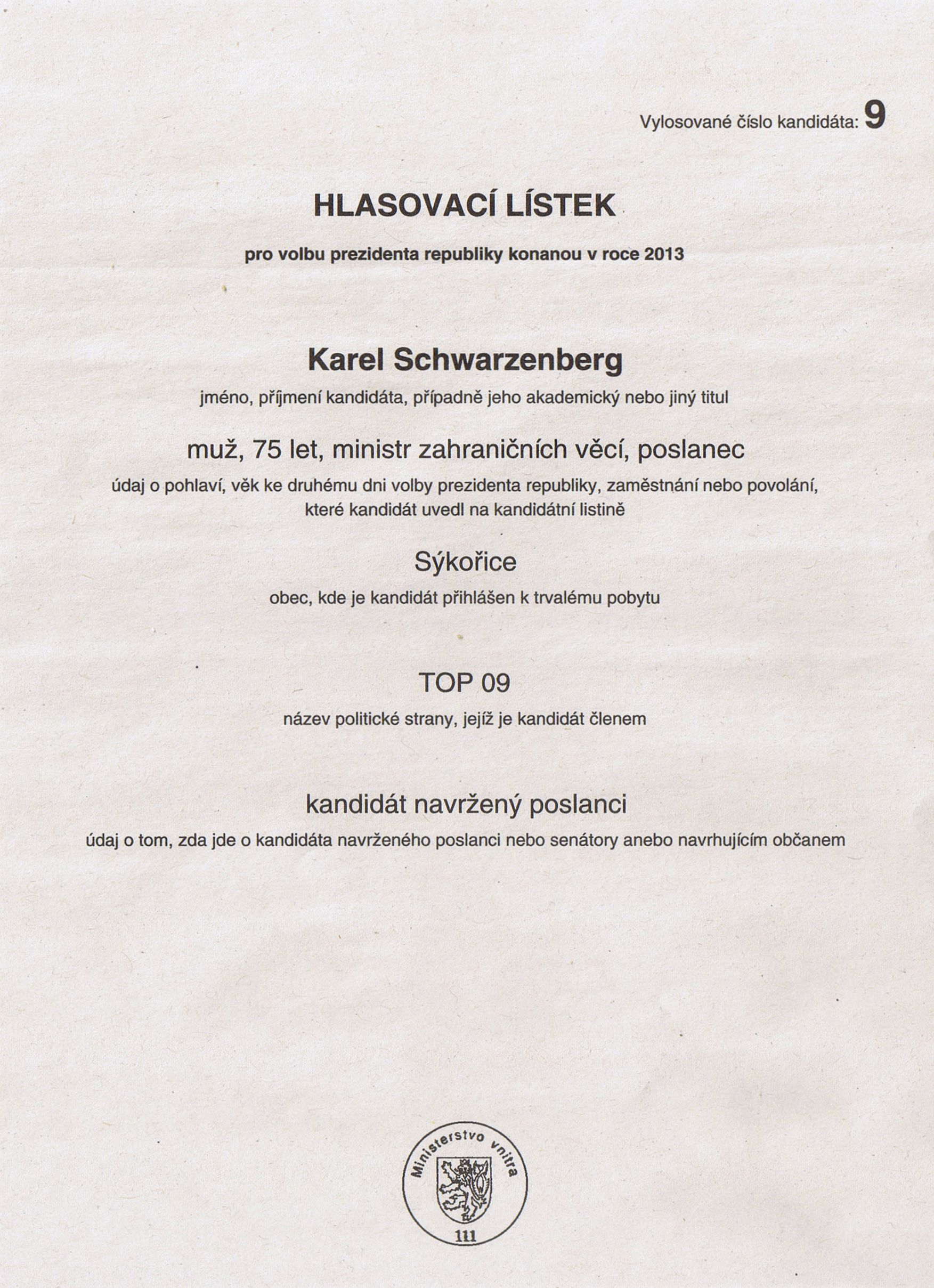
A sample of a ballot paper of Miloš Zeman and Karel Schwarzenberg used for the first round of the presidential election.

Zeman and Fischer were leading in the polls, but Schwarzenberg's campaign ended on a higher note with a crowd of about 10,000 people at a rally in Prague. Zeman said of the runoff: "It will be a presidential race between a candidate for the left and a candidate for the right. We'll start from scratch for the second round;" Schwarzenberg said of his campaign that he would make the Czech Republic "a successful country." Vladimír Franz called his campaign "a success."

=== First round ===
Miloš Zeman and Jan Fischer stated they would run if the election is direct. 2008 presidential candidate Jan Švejnar was also speculated as a candidate. Zeman's Party of Civic Rights started petition campaign for direct election on 29 June 2011. Petition was signed by more than 100,000 people as of October 2011. Direct election was accepted by parliament on 8 February 2012.

Karel Schwarzenberg announced his candidature on 22 October 2011.

Former prime minister of the Czech Republic Jan Fischer announced his candidature on 7 January 2012. Jana Bobošíková announced her candidature on 9 February 2012. Miloš Zeman stated that he will officially announce his candidature when he gathers enough signatures.

Miloš Zeman announced his candidature on 14 February 2012. Party of Civic Rights started to gather signatures for him. His presidential bid received support from LEV 21 and some politicians of Czech Social Democratic Party (ČSSD). ČSSD later decided to stand its own candidate Jiří Dienstbier Jr.

Jan Fischer became front-runner in early 2012. Jan Švejnar was considered his main rival. Miloš Zeman was third strongest candidate according to polls. Švejnar himself was at the time waiting if he receives support of Czech Social Democratic Party

Miloš Zeman started gathering signatures on 21 March 2012 when he launched his presidential campaign. Jan Fischer started his campaign on 2 April 2012.

Jan Švejnar withdrew from ČSSD primaries on 2 May 2012 and decided to run as independent. Czech Social Democratic Party then nominated Jiří Dienstbier Jr.

Zeman grew in polls and in May 2012 he caught up with Jan Švejnar in polls. He also received signatures of 10 senators which meant he doesn't need 50,000 signatures. Zeman gathered required number of signatures by the end of June 2012. Polls in June 2012 indicated that Miloš Zeman became Fischer's main rival.

Civic Democratic Party nominated Přemysl Sobotka on 28 June 2012 when Sobotka won the party's presidential primaries. Sobotka stated that his campaign will cost 8 million Korunas. Candidate of Czech Social Democratic Party Jiří Dienstbier Jr. stated on the other hand that his campaign will cost tens of million Korunas. Dienstbier came third according to one of polls.

Jan Fischer started to fully pursue his campaign on 9 July. He was supported by businessman Jaromír Soukup. Fischer was still front-runner at the time while Miloš Zeman was his main competition. Jan Švejnar who was originally considered the main rival of Fischer was losing in polls due to his indecisiveness.

Vladimír Franz announced his candidature on 30 July 2012.

Přemysl Sobotka started his campaign on 17 August 2012. Jan Fischer gathered 50,000 signatures by the end of August 2012.

Švejnar announced on 11 September 2012 that he won't run and endorsed Jan Fischer. Tomio Okamura started to gather signatures at the time On 14 September 2012, Jan Fischer officially launched his campaign. He defined himself against Zeman and stated that "Czech Republic isn't a burnt land" reminding Zeman's statements from 1990s. He promised that Czechs won't be ashamed of him as a president. Švejnar's withdrawal led to Fischer's growth in polls.

Green Party supported Táňa Fischerová for the election. Greens started gathering signatures for her on 27 September 2012. Jana Bobošíková gathered enough signatures on 29 September 2012. Vladimír Dlouhý and Zuzana Roithová announced on 1 October 2012 that they are getting closer to required number of signatures.

Tomio Okamura announced candidature on 3 October 2012. He also started to gather signatures. Zuzana Roithová gathered enough signatures on the same day. Vladimír Dlouhý announced that he gathered 50,000 signatures on 5 October 2012.

As of 5 November 2012, Miloš Zeman, Vladimír Dlouhý, Jan Fischer, Jana Bobošíková, Zuzana Roithová, Vladimír Franz and Tomio Okamura reportedly had enough signatures to run. Táňa Fischerová and Pavel Kořán were close to the number while Klára Samková and Ladislav Jakl was unlikely get enough signatures.

Nominations were closed on 6 November 2012. There were 11 candidates who met required conditions. Miloš Zeman, Jan Fischer, Vladimír Franz, Zuzana Roithová, Tomio Okamura, Táňa Fischerová, Vladimír Dlouhý and Jana Bobošíková gathered over 50,000 signatures while Jiří Dienstbier, Přemysl Sobotka and Karel Schwarzenberg received parliamentary nomination. On 23 November, Bobošíková, Dlouhý and Okamura were disqualified from the election due to invalid signatures. Bobošíková was returned to the election after recount on 13 December 2012.

According to polls in November 2012, a gap between Fischer and Zeman started to shrink. Zeman took lead in January 2013 after debates held prior to voting.

Voting took place on 11 and 12 January 2013. Zeman and Karel Schwarzenberg qualified for the second round. Jan Fischer was surprisingly eliminated when he received only 16% of votes and came third. Zeman received only 40,000 votes more than Schwarzenberg. Chances of both candidates in second round were considered balanced.

=== Second round ===
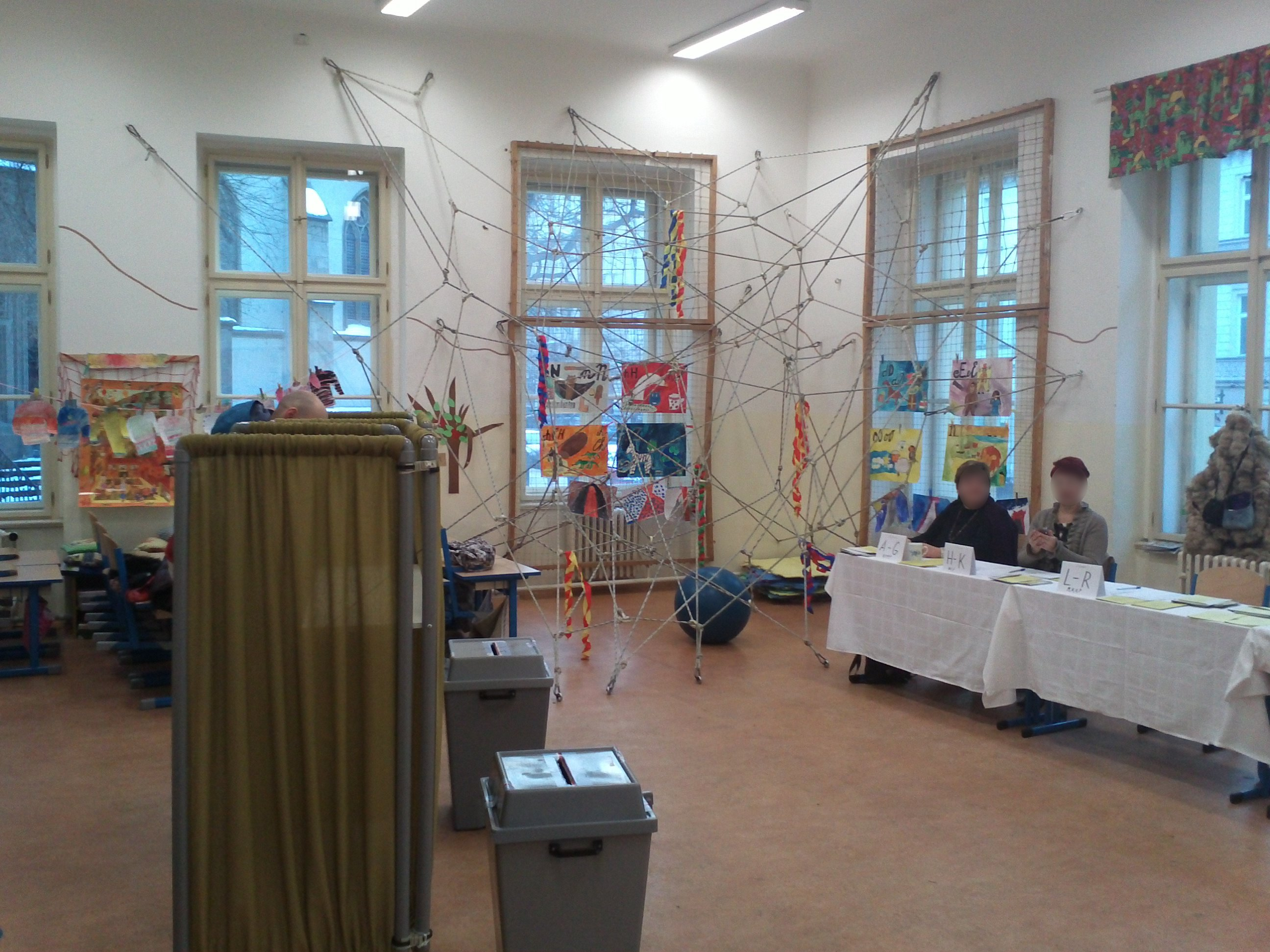
Second round at Štěpánská Elementary, Prague, Czech Republic

The campaign for the second round started with the agreement of both candidates, Miloš Zeman and Karel Schwarzenberg, not to attack each other and to conduct their campaign in a civil manner. However, when, in the second debate in the Czech Television held on 17 January 2013, Karel Schwarzenberg stated that the expulsion of Germans from Czechoslovakia after World War II would be today (in the 21st century) considered a war crime and the creators of the Beneš decrees (a series of laws dealing inter alia with the status of ethnic Germans and Hungarians in postwar Czechoslovakia in connection with Article 12 of the Potsdam Agreement) would be probably judged by the Hague Tribunal as war criminals, Zeman responded as following: "... he who marks (...) one of the presidents of Czechoslovakia as a war criminal, speaks as a "sudeťák" [Sudeten German] and not as the president". Schwarzenberg has been criticized for the fact that his wife cannot speak Czech and that he spent a part of his life abroad, despite the fact that his family fled from communists when he was a child. It was suggested that members of his family collaborated with Nazis, most notably by the son of the Czech President, Václav Klaus Jr. These charges have been dismissed by historians. President Václav Klaus, his Slovak spouse Livia and son Václav expressed their concerns towards Schwarzenberg, pointing to the complete lack of knowledge of the Czech language of his spouse or to his emigration during the communist era. Schwarzenberg responded that "...the last hundred years have demonstrated that an appeal to the lowest instincts has tragic consequences." Additionally, he countered by claiming that the President Klaus and Zeman created a power group and manipulated his claims. He also called their alleged pact a "fraud on the voters". In a leaked text message to a friend, President Klaus wrote that if Karel Schwarzenberg won the election, he would consider emigration.

Flag of the president of the Czech Republic with the inscription "Truth prevails".

The critics of Karel Schwarzenberg mentioned his post in the unpopular cabinet of Petr Nečas. Schwarzenberg, leader of a government coalition party TOP 09, a vice-premier and a foreign minister, was frequently associated with the finance minister and his TOP 09 colleague Miroslav Kalousek, one of the key proponents of the austerity measures and spending cuts in the Czech Republic. In the first round, he received the majority of support by voters in Bohemian regions and in some of the biggest Czech cities, such as Prague, Brno, and Plzeň.

Miloš Zeman, a former successful politician and Social Democratic prime minister, announced his comeback and the intention to run in the election in February 2012. He narrowly won the first round, supported mainly by voters from industrial regions such as North Bohemia and Silesia, and smaller towns and villages. He has been criticized for the opaque funding of his campaign; the media pointed to his special relationships with controversial business subjects and lobbyists, such as Miroslav Šlouf and the Russian oil company LUKoil. Some of the issues associated with his previous political activities also reappeared in public. During the pre-election debates, Zeman had to face questions about connections between his former chief advisor Šlouf and the alleged mafia kingpin František Mrázek or about a discrediting campaign against his former colleague, Minister Petra Buzková.

On 22 January, the newspaper Mladá fronta DNES reported that the "massive negative campaign" of Miloš Zeman and his team won him popularity in the online media, while Schwarzenberg's supporters have a majority on social sites, such as Facebook.

During the election, the tensions and rivalries in the Czech society and media culminated to an unusual degree. Some of the commentators and politologists pointed to growing polarization of the society, which was also noted by some of the foreign media, such as The New York Times.

On 26 January, Miloš Zeman won the second round of the election. In his first post-election speech, he thanked his supporters and promised to be the president of all people. He also criticized the media that openly supported only one of the candidates. "Truth and love have finally prevailed over lies and hatred", stated the outgoing President Klaus, ironically paraphrasing the renowned Czech statesman (and political opponent) Václav Havel.

The Austrian press ascribed Zeman's victory to a "dirty anti-German campaign."

Median a Czech agency made a survey to find out what was the reason of the result. According to the survey Zeman was able to gain votes of left-wing supporters of other candidates namely Jan Fischer and Jiří Dienstbier Jr. Schwarzenberg on the other hand a little exhausted his electoral base in the first round and lost some supporters during a debate about Beneš decrees and his membership in Petr Nečas' Cabinet. According to the survey Zeman was an acceptable candidate for 46% of voters and Schwarzenberg for 35%. 71% of asked expected that the next president will influence the government and will support patriotism.

=== Campaign Finance ===
Candidate	Raised	Money spent	Services cost	Debt	Total spent	Source
Karel Schwarzenberg	36,449,000 CZK	36,335,000 CZK	11,778,000 CZK	0 CZK	48,113,000 CZK	
Miloš Zeman	25.500.000 CZK	25.500.000 CZK	11,700,000 CZK	3,500,000 CZK	37,200,000 CZK	
Jan Fischer				8,180,000 CZK	33,200,000 CZK	
Jiří Dienstbier	16,300,000 CZK	15,400,000 CZK	1,500,000 CZK	0 CZK	16,900,000 CZK	
Přemysl Sobotka	15,032,000 CZK			0 CZK	14,900,000 CZK	
Zuzana Roithová					670,000 CZK	
Vladimír Franz				0 CZK	480,000 CZK	
Jan Bobošíková	156,000 CZK			0 CZK	152,000 CZK	
Táňa Fischerová					130,000 CZK	

== Results ==
There were 14,904 polling stations in the Czech Republic, and 102 abroad.

During the second round, in the presence of journalists, Karel Schwarzenberg registered an invalid vote by forgetting to insert his paper into the required stamped envelope.

Candidate	Party	First round		Second round	
Candidate	Party	Votes	%	Votes	%
Miloš Zeman	Party of Civic Rights – Zemanovci	1,245,848	24.22	2,717,405	54.80
Karel Schwarzenberg	TOP 09	1,204,195	23.41	2,241,171	45.20
Jan Fischer	Independent	841,437	16.36		
Jiří Dienstbier Jr.	Czech Social Democratic Party	829,297	16.12		
Vladimír Franz	Independent	351,916	6.84		
Zuzana Roithová	KDU-ČSL	255,045	4.96		
Táňa Fischerová	Key Movement	166,211	3.23		
Přemysl Sobotka	Civic Democratic Party	126,846	2.47		
Jana Bobošíková	Sovereignty	123,171	2.39		
Total		5,143,966	100.00	4,958,576	100.00
Valid votes		5,143,966	99.53	4,958,576	99.50
Invalid/blank votes		24,195	0.47	24,905	0.50
Total votes		5,168,161	100.00	4,983,481	100.00
Registered voters/turnout		8,435,522	61.27	8,434,648	59.08
Source: Volby.cz

== See also ==
- President Wanted - a documentary about the election
- 2012 Civic Democratic Party presidential primaries
- 2012 Czech Social Democratic Party presidential primaries
- Endorsements in the 2013 Czech presidential election
