= Evžen Tošenovský =

Czech politician (born 1956)

Evžen Tošenovský MEP
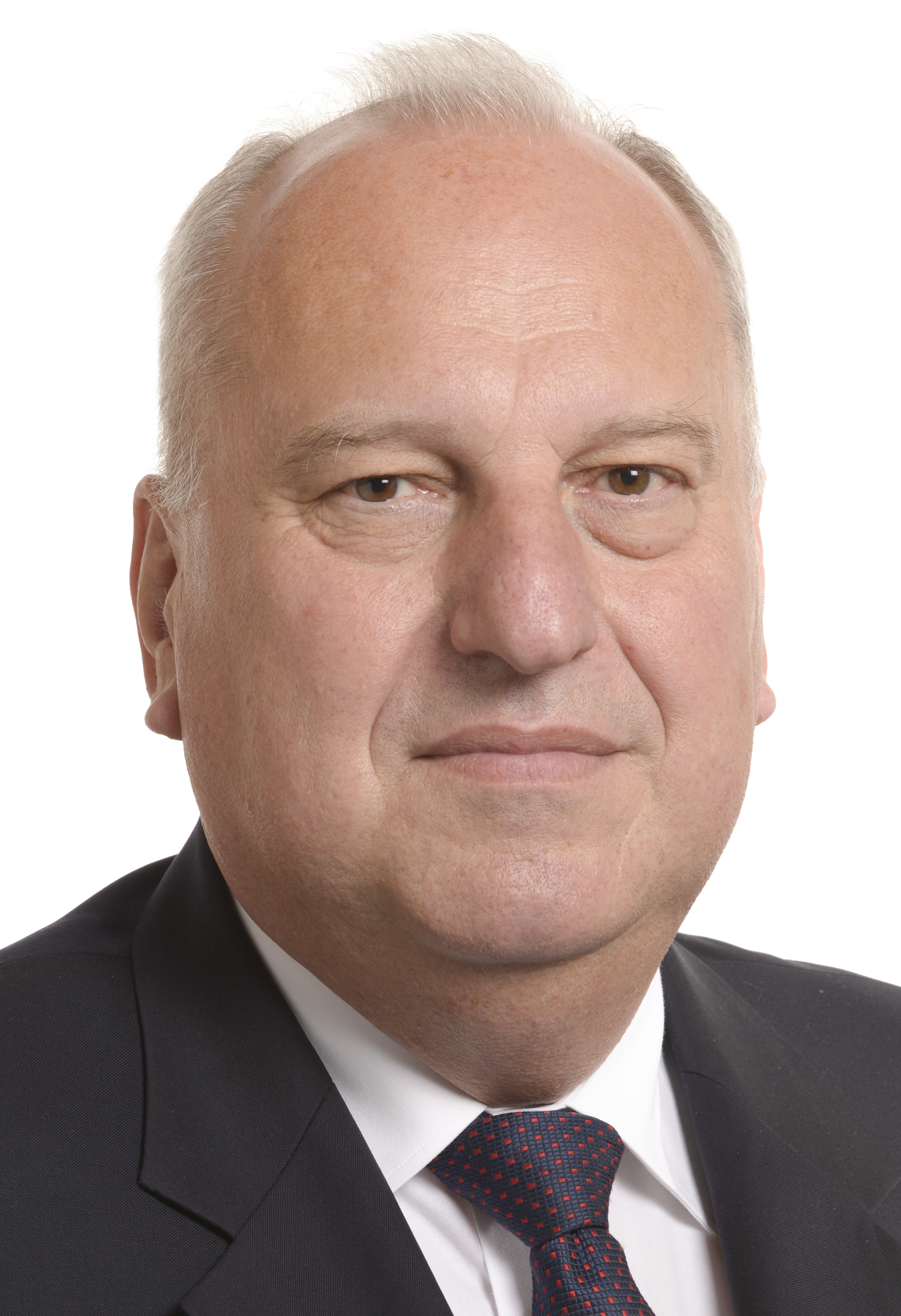

Member of the European Parliament for Czech Republic
- In office 14 July 2009 – 15 July 2024

Governor of Moravian-Silesian Region
- In office 21 December 2000 – 13 November 2008
- Preceded by: Established
- Succeeded by: Jaroslav Palas

Personal details
- Born: 26 February 1956 (age 70) Ostrava, Czechoslovakia
- Party: ODS
- Education: VSB – Technical University of Ostrava

Evžen Tošenovský (born 26 February 1956) is a Czech politician. He was elected as a Member of the European Parliament (MEP) in the 2009 European Parliament election receiving the largest number of preference votes.

Tošenovský graduated from the VSB – Technical University of Ostrava in 1981. In 1993, he was elected mayor of Ostrava and remained in the office until 2000. From 2000 to 2008, Tošenovský served as governor of Moravian-Silesian Region.

He's married and has two children. Tošenovský is also a recipient of numerous awards and decorations. In 2002, he was promoted to the rank of knight of the Légion d'honneur.

He ran for president in the first direct presidential election. He participated in Civic democratic primaries but lost to Přemysl Sobotka.
