= 2008 President of the Senate of the Czech Republic election =

- 26 November 2008
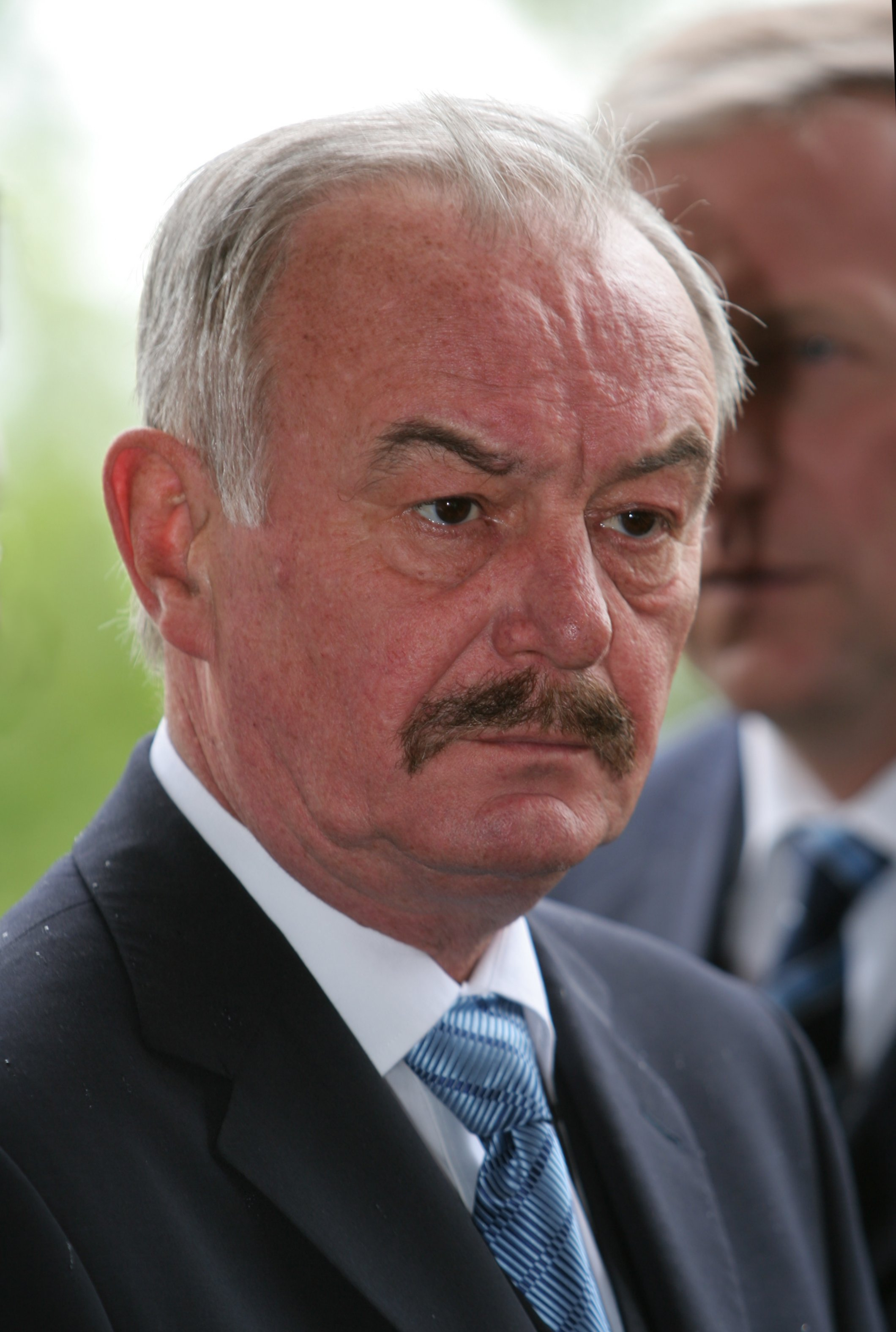
Candidate	Přemysl Sobotka
Party	ODS
Popular vote	78
Percentage	97.5%
President before election
Přemysl Sobotka
ODS
Elected President
Přemysl Sobotka
ODS

Election of the President of the Senate of the Czech Republic was held on 26 November 2008. Přemysl Sobotka wa reelected for his third term.

== Background and voting ==
The Civic Democratic Party has suffered heavy losses during 2008 Senate election losing its Senate majority despite remaining the largest senate faction. The Czech Social Democratic Party has won the election and had major gains. Social Democrats then suggested they would nominate Petr Pithart or Jiří Dienstbier for the position of Senate President. Civic Democrats decided to support the incumbent President Přemysl Sobotka. Sobotka stated he would run even if Social Democrats would nominate him a rival. Social Democratic leader Jiří Paroubek supported Pithart's nomination.

Přemysl Sobotka announced his candidacy on 26 October 2008. Social Democrats announced on 29 October 2018 they wouldn't nominate their own candidate. Social Democratic Senator Milan Štěch stated that Sobotka should remain the leader.

Election was held on 29 November 2008. Sobotka was the only candidate he received 78 votes on 80 and was elected for his third term.
