= 2012 Czech Social Democratic Party presidential primaries =

Czech Social Democratic Party presidential primaries, 2012
- 19 May 2012
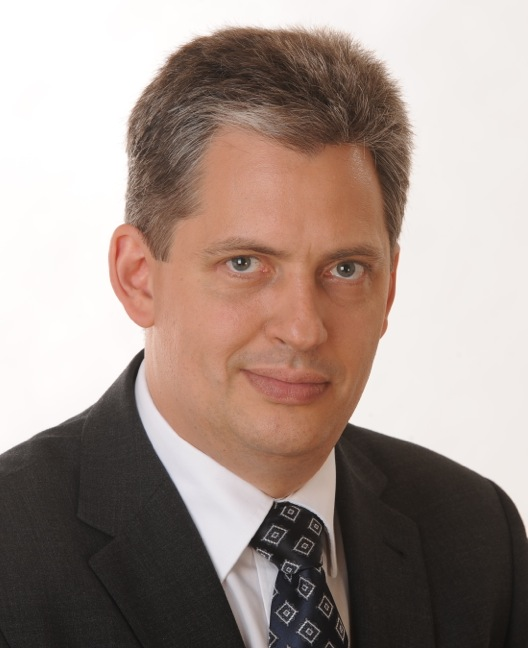
Nominee	Jiří Dienstbier	against
Party	ČSSD
Electoral vote	107	35
Percentage	75.35%	24.65%

Presidential primaries to select the Czech Social Democratic Party candidate for the 2013 presidential elections were held in May 2012. The primaries were indirect, with only members of the party's Central Executive Committee able to vote. Jiří Dienstbier Jr. became the party's candidate after receiving 107 votes to the 35 against. Dienstbier's only rival was Jan Švejnar, who withdrew prior to voting taking place.

== Candidates ==
- Jiří Dienstbier Jr. - Senator in Kladno district and most popular politician at the time.
- Jan Švejnar - Economist who was party's candidate in 2008. He was supported by Michal Hašek. Švejnar withdrawn from primaries on 9 May 2012 as he wanted to run as independent.

=== Speculated candidates ===
- Vladimír Špidla - He was speculated to be possible candidate of ČSSD.
- Miloš Zeman - There had been speculation that he would stand.
- Zdeněk Škromach - He was suggested by some members of ČSSD.

== Support of candidates in opinion polls ==
Date	Agency	Jiří Dienstbier	Jan Švejnar	Vladimír Špidla
8 May 2012	Median	4.5	17.5	—N/a
19 Apr - 1 May 2012	PPM Factum	5.3	17.8	—N/a
14 Apr 2012	Median	7.5	19.0	—N/a
23 Mar - 3 Apr 2012	PPM Factum	7.2	17.2	—N/a
23 Feb - 6 Mar 2012	PPM Factum	7.4	15.1	—N/a
14 - 21 Feb 2012	Sanep	—N/a	12.6	0.8

== Results ==
Candidate	Votes	%
Jiří Dienstbier Jr.	107	70.39
Against	35	23.03
not vote	10	6.58
Total	152	100
