= Proč právě Zeman? =

Czech political book

Proč právě Zeman? (English: Why Zeman?) is a book by Czech authors Jan Herzmann and Martin Komárek, about Miloš Zeman's 2013 presidential campaign and reasons for his victory. It was published in March 2013. The book follows the presidential candidates from the first round. The authors concluded that Karel Schwarzenberg was the ideal opponent for Zeman, as he never had a chance of beating him.
