= Jan Fischer (Czech actor) =

Czech Jewish actor and theatre director

Jan Fischer, also Jan Fišer (19 July 1921, in Prague – 26 September 2011, in Česká Lípa) was a Czech Jewish actor and theatre director. During World War II he was transported to the Jewish ghetto at Terezín where he directed plays. Fischer survived the death camps and returned to Prague after the war to marry his wife Hana (Meissl). Their daughter was the actress Taťana Fischerová.

The artist Franz Peter Kien sketched Fischer in the role of I. P. Omelet in the Terezin production of Gogol's "The Marriage."
