= Táňa Fischerová =

Czech actress (1947–2019)

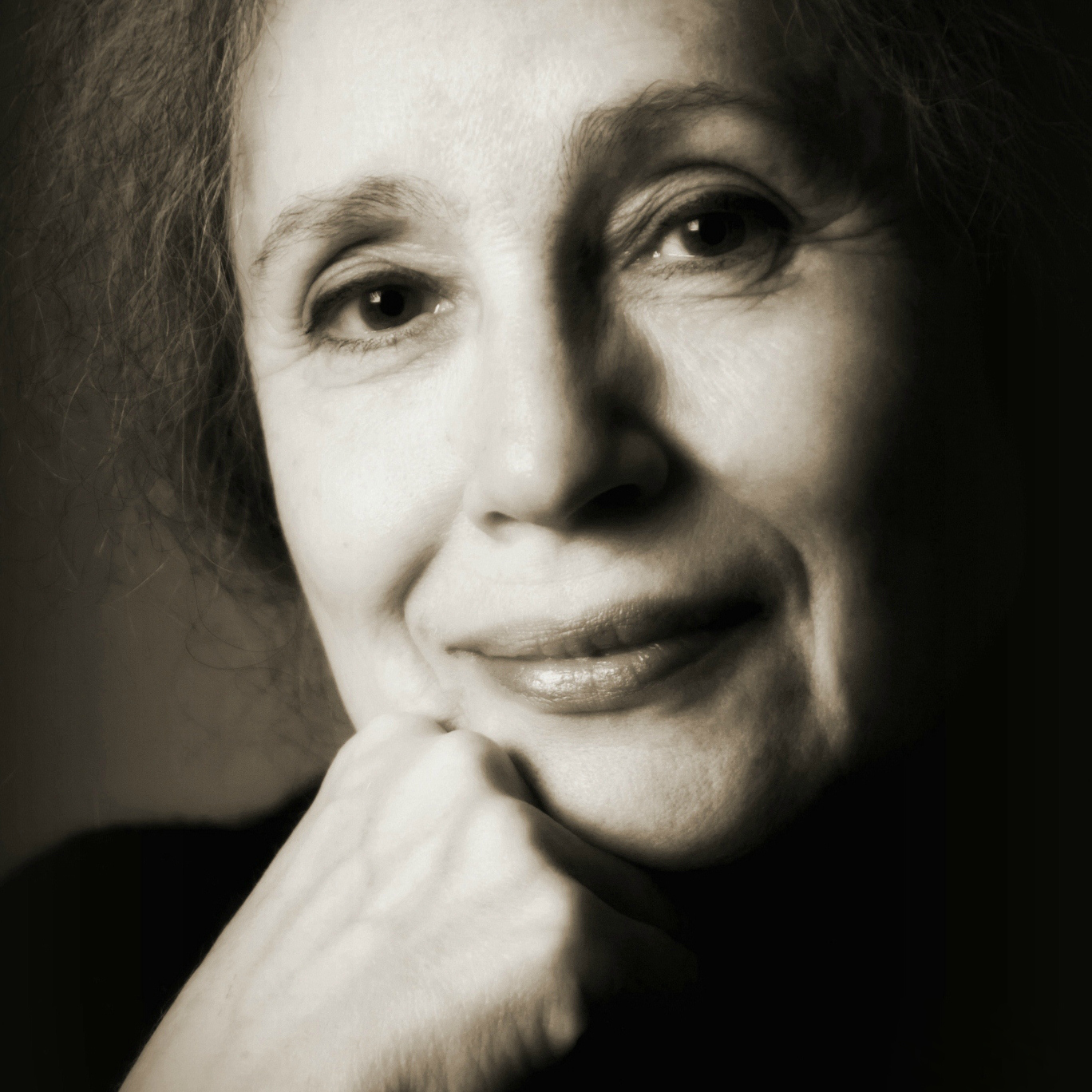
- Born: 6 June 1947; Prague, Czechoslovakia
- Died: 25 December 2019 (aged 72); Černošice, Czech Republic
- Occupations: Actress writer television host politician civic activist
- Website: tanafischerova.cz

Taťana Fischerová (better known as Táňa Fischerová) (6 June 1947 – 25 December 2019) was a Czech actress, writer, television host, politician and civic activist. From 2002 to 2006, she was a member of the Parliament of the Czech Republic. She was a candidate in the 2013 Czech presidential election.

== Biography ==
Fischerová was born in Prague. Her father, actor and theatre director Jan Fischer (or Fišer), was imprisoned in Theresienstadt and Auschwitz concentration camps during World War II.

She studied at the Janáček Academy of Music and Performing Arts in Brno, however, she did not finish her studies. In the late 1960s, she worked with Prague's Drama Club. She was sacked from the theatre during the period of normalization (in 1973). She then worked with the Jiří Wolker Theatre for four years. However, after her son Kryštof, whose father is the composer Petr Skoumal, was born with cerebral palsy, she left the theatre. In the 1980s, she worked as a freelance actress. During her acting career, she collaborated with significant personalities of Czech cinema, such as Jan Kačer, Evald Schorm, Antonín Máša, Jaromil Jireš, and Karel Kachyňa.

In 1989, she signed the petition "Několik vět" (A Few Sentences) prepared by the informal civic initiative Charter 77. At that time, she began participating in civic activities.

In 2002, Fischerová was elected to a seat in the Parliament of the Czech Republic as an independent candidate running on the slate of the Unie svobody-DEU (Freedom Union – Democratic Union). She served until 2006. However, she did not succeed in the next election, this time to the Senate of the Parliament of the Czech Republic.

Fischerová was one of the three female candidates in the 2013 Czech presidential election, along with Zuzana Roithová and Jana Bobošíková. She was supported by the Green Party. Her team gathered around 65,000 approved signatures from citizens and met the quorum of minimum of 50,000. In the 1st round of the election, she placed 7th with 3.23% (166 211 votes). She did not qualify for the second round.

She was a member of the board of the Dagmar and Václav Havel Foundation VIZE 97, the Czech Helsinki Committee, and a member of Amnesty International. Along with the singer Marta Kubišová and film director Jan Kačer, she helped to organize the series of annual advent charity concerts broadcast by the Czech Television.

== Selected filmography ==
- Kohout plaší smrt (1961)
- Hotel for Strangers (1966)
- Prodloužený čas (Extended Time) (1984)
- Lev s bílou hřívou (The Lion with the White Mane) (1986)
- Svědek umírajícího času (1989)
- Hanele (1999)
- Drona (2008 film) (2008)

== Selected bibliography ==
- Bílý den ... a jiné příběhy. Prague: Troja, 1999, 119 pp. ISBN 80-902-4282-0. (in Czech)
- Jeden čas seje, jeden plody sbírá. Illustration Ivan Svatoš. Prague: Svatošovo nakladatelství, 2002, 35 pp. ISBN 80-238-9785-3. (in Czech)
- Lydiiny dveře. Illustration Lýdie Hladíková. Prague: Porozumění, 1994, 84 pp. ISBN 80-238-1948-8. (in Czech)
- Táňa Fischerová: nežít jen pro sebe. Prague: Portál, 2002, 133 pp. ISBN 978-807-1786-542. (interview with Daniela Brůhová) (in Czech)
- Láska nevládne, láska tvoří: hledání cest k proměně společnosti. Hranice: Fabula, 2012, 177 pp. ISBN 978-808-7635-025. (co-authored with Radomil Hradil). (in Czech)
- Světliny 2: putování k polednám. Prague: Chvojkovo nakladatelství, 2006, 144 pp. ISBN 80-861-8352-1. (co-authored with Ludvík Procházka and Karel Funk). (in Czech)
