= Dvory nad Lužnicí =

- Municipality
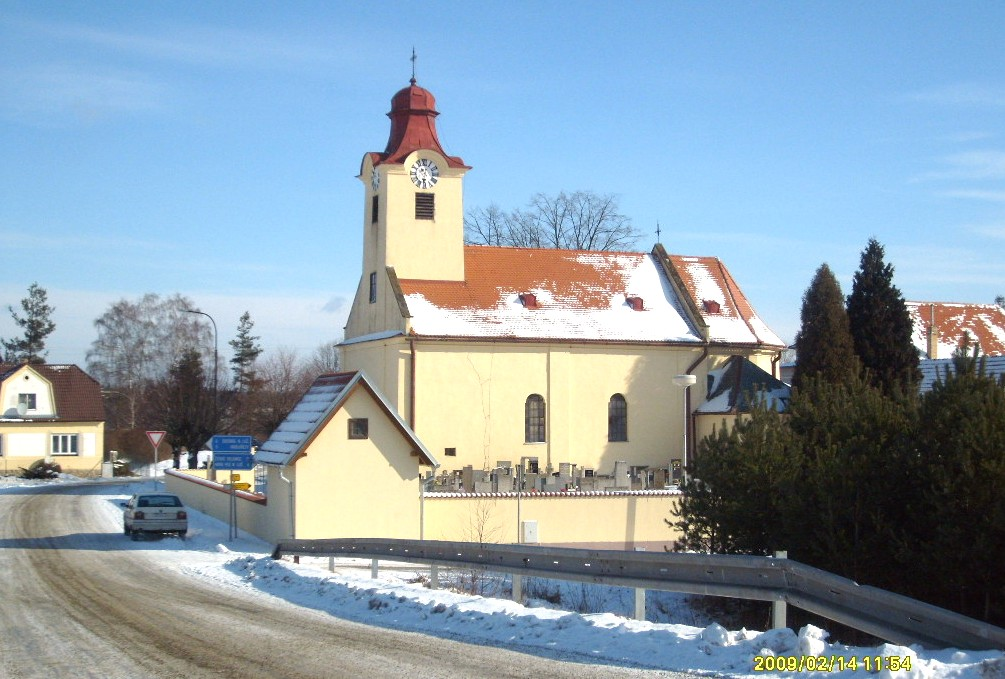
- Church of the Assumption of the Virgin Mary

- Location in the Czech Republic
- Coordinates: 48°51′10″N 14°54′2″E
- Country: Czech Republic
- Region: South Bohemian
- District: Jindřichův Hradec
- First mentioned: 1499

Area
  - Total: 15.64 km^{2} (6.04 sq mi)
- Elevation: 461 m (1,512 ft)

Population (2026-01-01)
  - Total: 365
  - Density: 23.3/km^{2} (60.4/sq mi)
- Time zone: UTC+1 (CET)
  - Summer (DST): UTC+2 (CEST)
- Postal code: 378 08
- Website: www.obecdvory.cz

Dvory nad Lužnicí (German: Beinhöfen) is a municipality and village in Jindřichův Hradec District in the South Bohemian Region of the Czech Republic. It has about 400 inhabitants. It is located on the Lužnice River.

== History ==
The municipality was historically a part of Lower Austria before 1920. In 1920 it was incorporated into Czechoslovakia as a result of Treaty of Saint-Germain-en-Laye.

== Demographics ==
Historical population
Year	Pop.	±%
1869	631	—
1880	614	−2.7%
1890	598	−2.6%
1900	676	+13.0%
1910	615	−9.0%
1921	592	−3.7%
1930	544	−8.1%
1950	459	−15.6%
1961	438	−4.6%
1970	388	−11.4%
1980	354	−8.8%
1991	349	−1.4%
2001	327	−6.3%
2011	332	+1.5%
2021	344	+3.6%
Source: Censuses

== Notable people ==
- Zuzana Roithová (born 1953), politician; lives here
