= Miroslav Šlouf =

Czech lobbyist (1948–2018)

Miroslav Šlouf (19 September 1948 – 16 February 2018) was a Czech lobbyist.

== Career ==
Between 1981 and 1992 he was a member of the Czech National Council. In 2000, he ran an unsuccessful campaign for senate as a Chrudim District candidate of the Czech Social Democratic Party.

The Party of Civic Rights – Zemanovci received money from Šlouf: "While denying allegations that it is financed by LUKoil, the party admits taking money from Russian-connected lobbyists. Chief among them is Miroslav Slouf, a former communist youth leader whose Slavia Consulting company brokered the LUKoil deal to supply Prague's airport. Slouf, who is known to be LUKoil's main promoter in the Czech Republic, also happens to be Zeman's right-hand man."

Šlouf has been filmed on numerous occasions entering and leaving buildings belonging to the Russian embassy in the Prague 6 district.

In September 2013, he was selected as leader of the Prague chapter of the SPOZ (Party of Civic Rights – Zemanovci) in the 2013 Czech legislative election.
