= Head Up – Electoral Bloc =

Head Up – Electoral Bloc Hlavu vzhůru – volební blok
- Founder: Jana Bobošíková
- Founded: 28 July 2006
- Dissolved: 23 February 2017
- Ideology: National conservatism Euroscepticism
- Political position: Right-wing to far-right

Hlavu vzhůru – volební blok, formerly Politika 21, was a small right-wing political party in the Czech Republic, established in 2006. The leader of the party was Jana Bobošíková, who had previously been a Member of the European Parliament.
