= Vladimír Dlouhý (politician) =

Czech Republic economist and politician

- Dlouhý in 2025

First Minister of Industry and Trade
- In office 2 July 1992 – 2 June 1997
- Prime Minister: Václav Klaus
- Preceded by: Office established
- Succeeded by: Karel Kühnl

Minister of Economy of the Czech and Slovak Federal Republic (ČSFR)
- In office 27 June 1990 – 2 July 1992
- Prime Minister: Marián Čalfa

Deputy Prime Minister of the first government of Marián Čalfa
- In office 10 December 1989 – 27 June 1990

Member of the Chamber of Deputies
- In office 1 June 1996 – 2 June 1997

Deputy of the Federal Assembly (SL)
- In office 7 June 1990 – 4 June 1992

Fourth president of the Czech Chamber of Commerce
- Incumbent
- Assumed office 22 May 2014
- Succeeded by: Petr Kužel

Personal details
- Born: 31 July 1953 (age 73) Prague, Czechoslovakia (now Czech Republic)
- Party: Communist Party of Czechoslovakia (1978–1989); Civic Forum (1990–1991); Civic Democratic Alliance (1991–1998)
- Children: son Štěpán and daughter Markéta
- Education: University of Economics; KU Leuven; Charles University

Vladimír Dlouhý (born 31 July 1953) is a Czech economist and politician.

Dlouhý is a former deputy chairman of the ODA political party and Minister of Industry and Trade between 1992 and 1997 in the government of Václav Klaus. Between 1989 and 1992 he served as the Minister of Economy of the Czech and Slovak Federal Republic (ČSFR). He currently works in the private sector and in the field of consulting and pedagogy activities. In May 2014, he was elected a President of the Czech Chamber of Commerce.

== Early life and education ==
Dlouhý studied economics at the University of Economics in Prague (computations in mathematical economic) and graduated in 1977. Between 1977 and 1978, he studied MBA at the Catholic University in Leuven in Belgium. As he was required to return to the Socialist Czechoslovakia, he did not manage to finish the two-year MBA studies. Between 1980 and 1982, he studied at the Charles University in a postgraduate programme of mathematical statistics and probability. Simultaneously, in 1980, he started Ph.D. studies at the University of Economics in Prague and, in 1983, he earned the degree of a candidate of science by defending dissertation thesis on the topic of ‘Unequal models of the socialist economy.’ A year later, this work was published as a book co-authored by Karel Dyba.

== Career in academia ==
Between 1977 and 1983, Dlouhý lectured at the University of Economics (VŠE). In 1984, he was a founding member of the Prognostic Department of the Czechoslovak Academy of Sciences (ČSAV), which later became the Prognostic Institute. There, he first worked as a research assistant, later as a head of department and eventually as a deputy head.

== Political career ==
In 1978, Dlouhý joined the Communist Party. In the third week of the November revolution of 1989 he was nominated as one of 10 Communists to the government of Czechoslovak Socialist Republic and on 10 December 1989 he was appointed Deputy Prime Minister of the federal government (the Government of National Understanding) where he also served as a Chairman of the State Planning Commission. In December 1989, he quit the Communist Party.

In the election Dlouhý joined the Assembly of People of the Federal Assembly (he was a lead candidate for the South Bohemian Region) and at the same time was appointed Federal Minister of Economy of the Czech and Slovak Federal Republic in the second government of Prime Minister Marián Čalfa. After dissolution of the Civic Forum in the autumn of 1991, he joined the Civil Democratic Alliance (ODA) and became its deputy head and in 1992 he was a lead candidate of ODA in the South Moravia. After the 1992 elections and the subsequent dissolution of the Czech and Slovak Federal Republic he joined the coalition government of Václav Klaus and was appointed the Minister of Industry and Trade. In the coalition government of Václav Klaus and in the same post he stayed even after elections in 1996, when he was elected to the Chamber of Deputies of the Czech Republic. In June 1997, he left all government and political posts.

== Career in the private sector ==
After leaving politics in 1997, Dlouhý worked in the private sector. Since September 1997 until now he has worked as an international adviser for multinational investment bank Goldman Sachs where he is responsible for Central and Eastern Europe.

From 1998 to 2010, Dlouhý worked as an adviser for ABB Group. Since 2010, he has been an adviser to the French investment fund Meridiam Infrastructure based in Paris. In the past, he was either a member of supervisory boards or an adviser to a number of other companies, such as Cofinec B.V in Amsterdam, Telefónica Czech Republic (Prague), KSK Power Ventur based in Hyderabad, India, PSJ, a.s. (Czech Rep.) and others. From 2013 to 2018, he was a member of the Advisory Group at Rolls-Royce Holdings in London. He is currently also a member of the supervisory board of Kooperativa.

At the same time, Dlouhý published in both domestic and foreign specialized journals and at international conferences. Since 2000, he has been lecturing again as a university teacher at the Institute of Economic Studies, Faculty of Social Sciences of the Charles University in Prague (teaches macroeconomics and economic policy). Between 2004 and 2010, he lectured at the University of Economics in Prague, where he was also a member of the Scientific Board of the Faculty of Economics. Between 2000 and 2011, he was a member of the Board of International Overseers) of the Illinois Institute of Technology (IIT) in Chicago. Since 2014, he has been a member of the Board of Directors of the Czech Technical University (ČVUT) in Prague, and, since 2018, he has also been a member of the board of directors of the Brno University of Technology (VUT).

Dlouhý is a member of a number of international and domestic institutions (he is a member of the Trilateral Commission; between 2010 and 2016, he was a vice-president of the European Group and was active in several other expert groups, such as DER Dialog, Euro 50 Group). Between 2006 and 2008, he was a member of an Independent Energy Commission, where he participated in the preparation of the long-term energy concept of the Czech Republic, published in the second half of 2008. Since 2009, he has been a member of the National Economic Council of the Czech government; in 2020, he was appointed again to this council. Between 2010 and 2012, he was a member of the European group of advisers to the managing director of the International Monetary Fund (IMF). He publishes extensively as an author or co-author, ranging from specialized texts to articles in the daily paper.

In 2009, Dlouhý established the public benefit company Prague Twenty, focused on the organisation of expert lectures in the fields of politics, social sciences, and culture, with the participation of foreign and domestic experts. Over the past years, many representatives from the Czech Republic have presented at these events (e.g. Václav Klaus, Zdeněk Tůma etc.) and abroad (e.g. Mario Monti, Jacob Frenkel etc.).

== Return to politics ==
In June 2012, Dlouhý announced his intention to run for president in the 2013 elections. Following the verification of signatures on petition sheets, the Ministry of Interior refused to register his candidacy due to insufficient number of signatures.

On 22 May 2014 in Plzeň, Dlouhý was elected at its Assembly as the President of the Czech Chamber of Commerce. He received 128 votes, thereby defeating Zdeněk Somr, who received 87 votes. In 2017, he was re-elected to hold the same post. In 2019, he was elected one of the deputy presidents of Eurochambres, under the leadership of president Christoph Leitl, and was elected president in March 2023.

In 2020, the Czech government of Prime Minister Andrej Babiš nominated Dlouhý as its candidate to succeed Angel Gurría in the position of Secretary-General of the Organisation for Economic Co-operation and Development (OECD) for a five-year term. By January 2021, he withdrew his candidacy due to insufficient support from other governments.

== Other activities ==
- Trilateral Commission, Member of the European Group

== Recognition ==
Together with Václav Klaus, Dlouhý was awarded ‘Ropák’ of the year 1993 and, in April 2016, he was awarded the Green Pearl for the following statement: ‘It is always quite difficult to interpret similar studies and results, but this really shows that the Třebíč Region and the whole southern part of the Vysočina Region would suffer very significantly economically and in the long term, if Dukovany were to be shut down or were not expanded.’ As much as the current numbers are ambiguous, which the authors admit, their conclusion is indisputable.“

== Personal life ==
Dlouhý has divorced twice; from his first marriage he has a son, Štěpán, and daughter, Markéta. His interests include music, history and sport, especially skiing, golf, cycling and running.

== See also ==
- Peter Sutherland
- Karel van Miert
- Mario Monti
- Romano Prodi
- Peter Sutherland
- Gianni Letta
