= Czech Sovereignty of Social Democracy =

ČSSD – Czech Sovereignty of Social Democracy ČSSD – Česká suverenita sociální demokracie
- Abbreviation: ČSSD
- Chairman: Jiří Paroubek
- Deputy Leaders: Jana Volfová; Petr Benda; Petr Gawlas; Pavel Havránek
- Founder: Jana Bobošíková; Jana Volfová
- Founded: 21 January 2011; 15 years ago
- Split from: Politika 21
- Headquarters: U Průhonu 1201/23, Prague
- Ideology: Social democracy; Left-wing nationalism; Euroscepticism; Anti-immigration
- Political position: Left-wing
- Colours: Orange
- Chamber of Deputies: 0 / 200
- Senate: 0 / 81
- European Parliament: 0 / 21

Party flag

Website
- cssdlidem.cz

ČSSD – Czech Sovereignty of Social Democracy (Czech: ČSSD – Česká suverenita sociální demokracie), until 29 June 2023 known as Czech Sovereignty (Czech: Česká Suverenita), formerly also known as Free Bloc (Czech: VOLNÝ blok) and Sovereignty – Jana Bobošíková Bloc (Czech: Suverenita – Blok Jany Bobošíkové), is a small left-wing nationalist Czech political party.

== History ==
=== Origins ===
The Party of Common Sense (Strana zdravého rozumu), led by Petr Hannig, took part in the 2002 election to the Chamber of Deputies three months after its foundation, winning 0.2% of the vote. This increased to 0.5% of the vote in the 2006 election.

In 2009, the Party of Common Sense began cooperating with former Eurosceptic MEP Jana Bobošíková (elected in 2004 for the Independents), her party Politika 21, and other independent candidates. This electoral alliance ran in the 2009 European election under the name 'Sovereignty', led by Bobošíková. The list came fifth, winning 4.3% of the vote, just short of the 5% threshold for representation. The Party of Common Sense changed its name to 'Sovereignty – Party of Common Sense' (Suverenita – Strana zdravého rozumu), and won 3.7% in the 2010 election, again falling short of parliamentary representation. The cooperation between the two parties subsequently ended.

=== Founding and Free Bloc ===
Sovereignty – Jana Bobošiková Bloc was established in 2011 in Prague, after the breakup of the Sovereignty – Party of Common Sense electoral alliance. It was described as right-wing. In January 2014, the party changed its name to Czech Sovereignty, and former Czech Social Democratic Party MP Jana Volfová became party chairwoman.

The party changed its name to Free Bloc (Volný blok) when Lubomír Volný, an MP for the Freedom and Direct Democracy party, joined Czech Sovereignty and became its parliamentary leader. Free Bloc won 1.33% of the vote in the 2021 election, falling short of parliamentary representation. The party changed its name back to Czech Sovereignty in January 2022 when it was described as far-right.

=== ČSSD – Czech Sovereignty of Social Democracy ===
Former Czech Prime Minister Jiří Paroubek joined the party in February 2024, and became party chair in the same month. The party is described as left-wing during this period.

== Election results ==
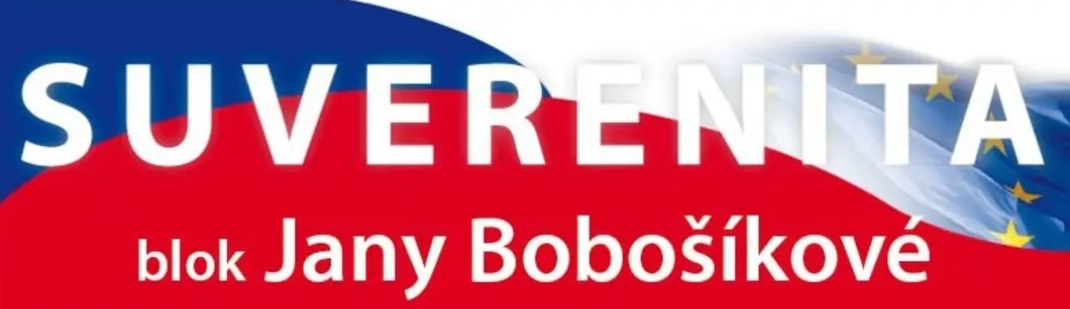
Logo of Sovereignty – Jana Bobošíková Bloc (2011–2014)

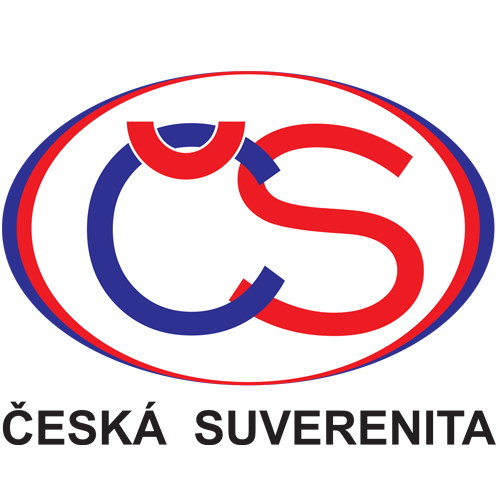
Logo of Czech Sovereignty (2014–2018)

Logo of the Free Bloc (2021–2022)

Logo of Czech Sovereignty (2018–2021, 2022–2023)

=== Chamber of Deputies ===
Year	Leader	Votes		Seats			Position
Year	Leader	No.	%	No.	±	Size	Position
2013 (Note: Ran on Head Up – Electoral Bloc list, which won 0 seats in total)	Jana Bobošíková	21,241	0.43	0 / 200	New	14th	Extra-parliamentary
2017 (Note: Ran on Bloc Against Islamization – Defence of the Homeland list, which won 0 seats in total)	Jana Borkovcová	5,077	0.10	0 / 200	0	20th	Extra-parliamentary
2021	Lubomír Volný	71,581	1.33	0 / 200	0	9th	Extra-parliamentary
2025	Jiří Paroubek	10,263	0.18	0 / 200	0	12th	Extra-parliamentary

=== Senate ===
Election	First round			Second round			Seats	Total seats	+/–
Election	Votes	%	Place	Votes	%	Place	Seats	Total seats	+/–
2026	7,672	0.66	45th				0 / 27	0 / 81	New

=== European Parliament ===
Election	List leader	Votes	%	Seats	+/−	EP Group
2014	Jana Volfová	2,086	0.13 (#15)	0 / 21	New	−
2019	David Rath	2,609	0.11 (#24)	0 / 21	0	−
2024	Jiří Paroubek	7,579	0.26 (#16)	0 / 21	0	−
