= Vladimír Franz =

Czech composer, painter and scholar

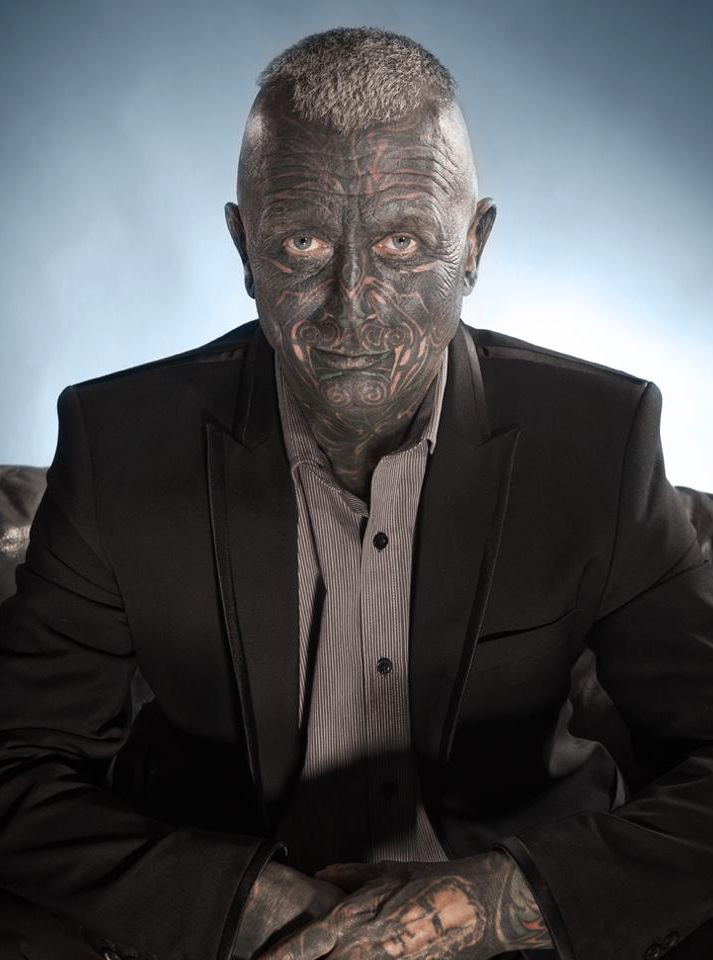
- Born: 25 May 1959 (age 67); Prague, Czechoslovakia
- Website: vladimirfranz.cz

Vladimír Franz (born 25 May 1959 in Prague, Czechoslovakia), is a Czech composer, painter, university scholar and occasional journalist, poet and playwright. Since the mid-1980s, he has composed stage music for more than 150 theatre performances—for many of which he was awarded national-level prizes. He has also composed a symphony, several operas, oratorios, a musical, a ballet, film music, and music for documentaries and radio plays. His second main area of activities in the field of arts is represented by painting. Since 1991 he has been a lecturer at the Prague's Faculty of Theatre. In 2012 he was also a registered candidate in the 2013 Czech presidential election. The attention of local and global media has been focused on him due to his extraordinarily extensive tattoos.

== Biography ==
Franz was born in Prague. He studied at gymnasium and later at the Faculty of Law of Charles University (1978–1982). During his studies, he took private lectures in painting, composition, art history and music history.

After his studies, he did not enter legal practice, but instead spent the 1980s in a variety of jobs, including as a high school teacher. In 1981, he co-founded the theatre Kytka, and gradually moved his attention to scenic music.

Since 1991, he has worked as a teacher at the Faculty of Theatre of the Academy of Performing Arts in Prague. In 2004, he was appointed Professor of Dramatic Arts.

In 2013 he was a candidate in the Czech presidential elections. He placed 5th in the first round with 6.84% (351,916 votes), but did not qualify for the second round.

== Tattoos ==
Vladimír Franz is known also for his extensive tattoos, including facial ones. His unusual appearance attracted the attention of world press during the 2013 presidential election.

In an interview for the TV NOVA, he commented:

The art of tattooing is accompanying mankind since time immemorial. In addition to the original magic and ritual function, it represents also an aesthetic function. Of course – an aesthetic point of view is a matter of each free individual. Tattooing is an expression of free will, not touching the freedom of others. It is an expression of permanent and unchangeable decision to stand up for your opinion, in both good and bad. (...) My tattooing is result of a long-term sophisticated concept, not a sudden emotion.

== Awards ==
Franz is a six-time recipient of the Alfréd Radok Award:

- 1998 – scenic music to the play Bloudění (Jaroslav Durych), directed by J. A. Pitínský, National Theatre, Prague
- 2000 – scenic music to the play Hamlet (William Shakespeare), directed by Vladimír Morávek, Klicperovo divadlo, Hradec Králové
- 2002 – scenic music to the play Marketa Lazarová (Vladislav Vančura), directed by J. A. Pitínský, National Theatre, Prague
- 2005 – scenic music to the play Devotion to the Cross (Pedro Calderón de la Barca), directed by Hana Burešová, Brno City Theatre
- 2006 – scenic music to the play Amphitryon (Molière), directed by Hana Burešová, Brno City Theatre
- 2007 – scenic music to the play Smrt Pavla I., Brno City Theatre

== Published works ==
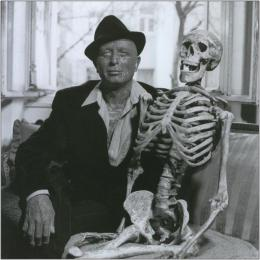
Franz posing with a human skeleton, 2012

- Kamenný most – 1997
- Faust – 1998
- Cirkus Humberto – 1998
- Júdit Tractatus Pacis – 1999
- Vladimír Franz pro Národní divadlo – 1999
- Gazdina roba – 2000
- Rút – 2001
- Kruhy do ledu – 2002
- Ha-Hamlet !!! (Shakespearovská svita) – 2005
- Triptych: Smrt Pavla I, Amfitryon, Znamení kříže – 2007

== See also ==
- List of Czech painters
- List of people known for extensive body modification
