= Jana Bobošíková =

Czech politician and journalist

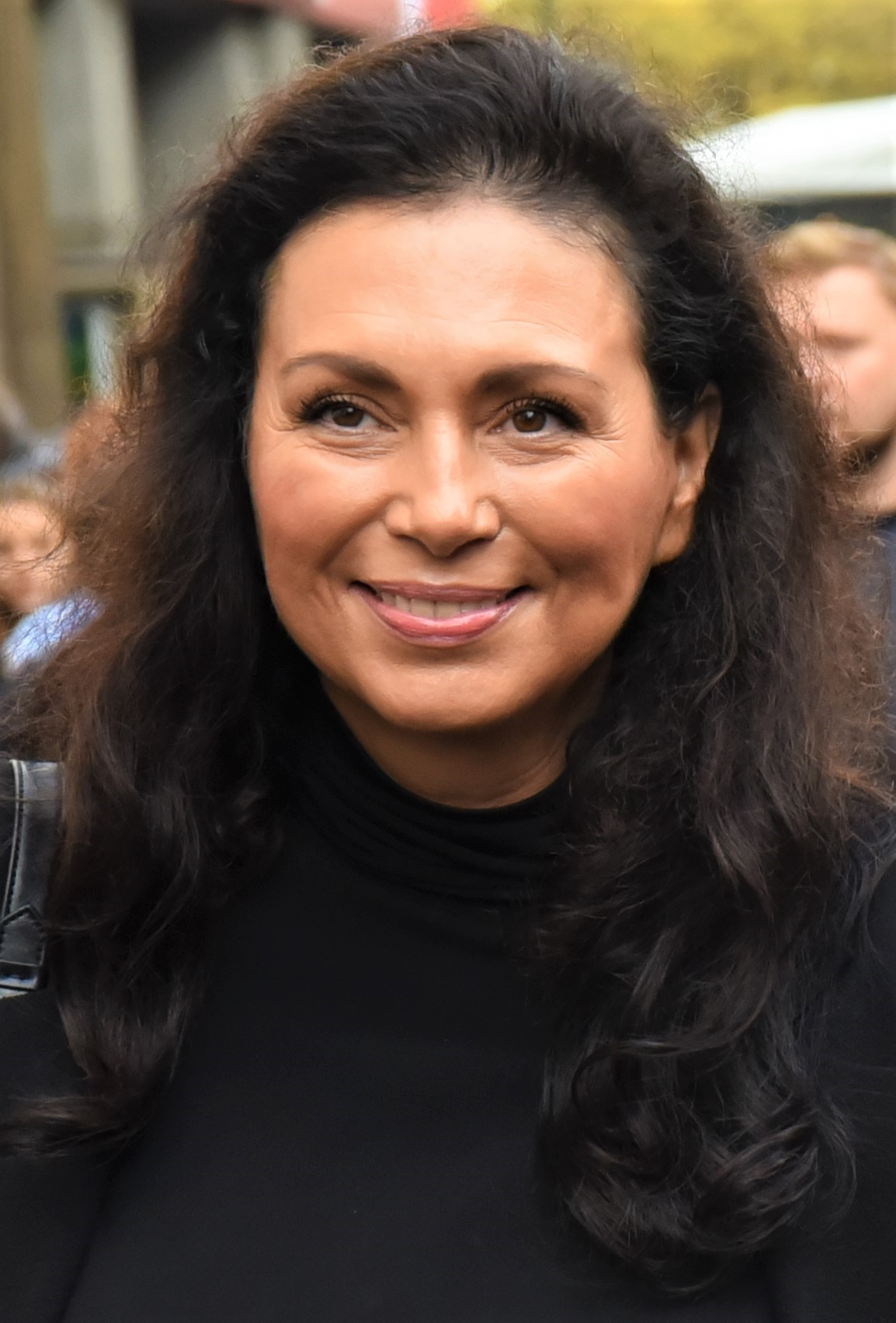
- Bobošíková in 2019

Member of the European Parliament for the Czech Republic
- In office 20 July 2004 – 13 July 2009

Personal details
- Born: 29 August 1964 (age 62) Prague, Czechoslovakia
- Party: „21“ (2006–2011); SBB (2011–2013); HLAVU VZHŮRU (2013–2014)
- Spouse: Pavel Bobošík (m. 1986; died 2022)
- Children: 2
- Education: Prague University of Economics and Business
- Occupation: Journalist • Politician

Jana Bobošíková (born 29 August 1964) is a Czech politician, journalist and presenter. In the 2004 European Parliament election she was elected a Member of the European Parliament for the Independents and remained unaffiliated in the European Parliament. In the 2008 and 2013 presidential elections she unsuccessfully ran for the office as President of the Czech Republic. She founded Politika 21 in 2006 and Sovereignty – Jana Bobošíková Bloc in 2009.

== Early life ==
She was a member of the Czechoslovak Socialist Youth Union. In 2012, Czech media noticed that in a TV news report from June 1986, she passed a bouquet of roses to President Gustáv Husák, the Secretary-General of the Communist Party of Czechoslovakia. She later told Czech Television that it had been "an honor". (Note: "Pro mě to byla čest.")

In 1987 she graduated with a master's degree in economics.

== Career ==
From 1989, Bobošíková presented TV programmes on politics and economics, spending most of her television career at Česká Televize (ČT). She was appointed Head of News in late 2000, and played a significant role in the Czech TV crisis of January 2001, following which she resigned from ČT and moved to TV Nova, where she worked until 2004.

She had already been an adviser to the chair of the Chamber of Deputies from 1999, and continued her move into politics in 2004 by standing for the European Parliament, elected on the Independents ticket. She was a Member of the European Parliament (MEP) until 2009. She sat on the Committee on Regional Development, was a substitute for the Committee on Economic and Monetary Affairs, and a member of the Delegation to the EU-Ukraine Parliamentary Cooperation Committee.

In 2009, she began cooperating with the Party of Common Sense. She led this electoral alliance in the 2009 European election under the name 'Sovereignty'; the list came fifth, winning 4.26% of the vote, just short of the 5% threshold for representation. In 2011, she established her own party, Sovereignty – Jana Bobošíková Bloc.

Bobošíková ran in the Czech presidential election in 2008 and 2013. In the first round of the 2013 election, she placed 9th with 2.39% (123,171 votes), and did not qualify for the second round.

Bobošíková launched a YouTube channel, Aby bylo jasno, on 19 January 2021.

On 31 March 2025, it was announced that Bobošíková would lead Stačilo! in the Central Bohemian Region in the 2025 Czech parliamentary election. The party came seventh, winning 4.31% of the vote, just short of the 5% threshold for representation. Bobošíková came 22nd in the Central Bohemian Region with 5,596 preferential votes.
