= Jan Švejnar =

Czech economist (born 1952)

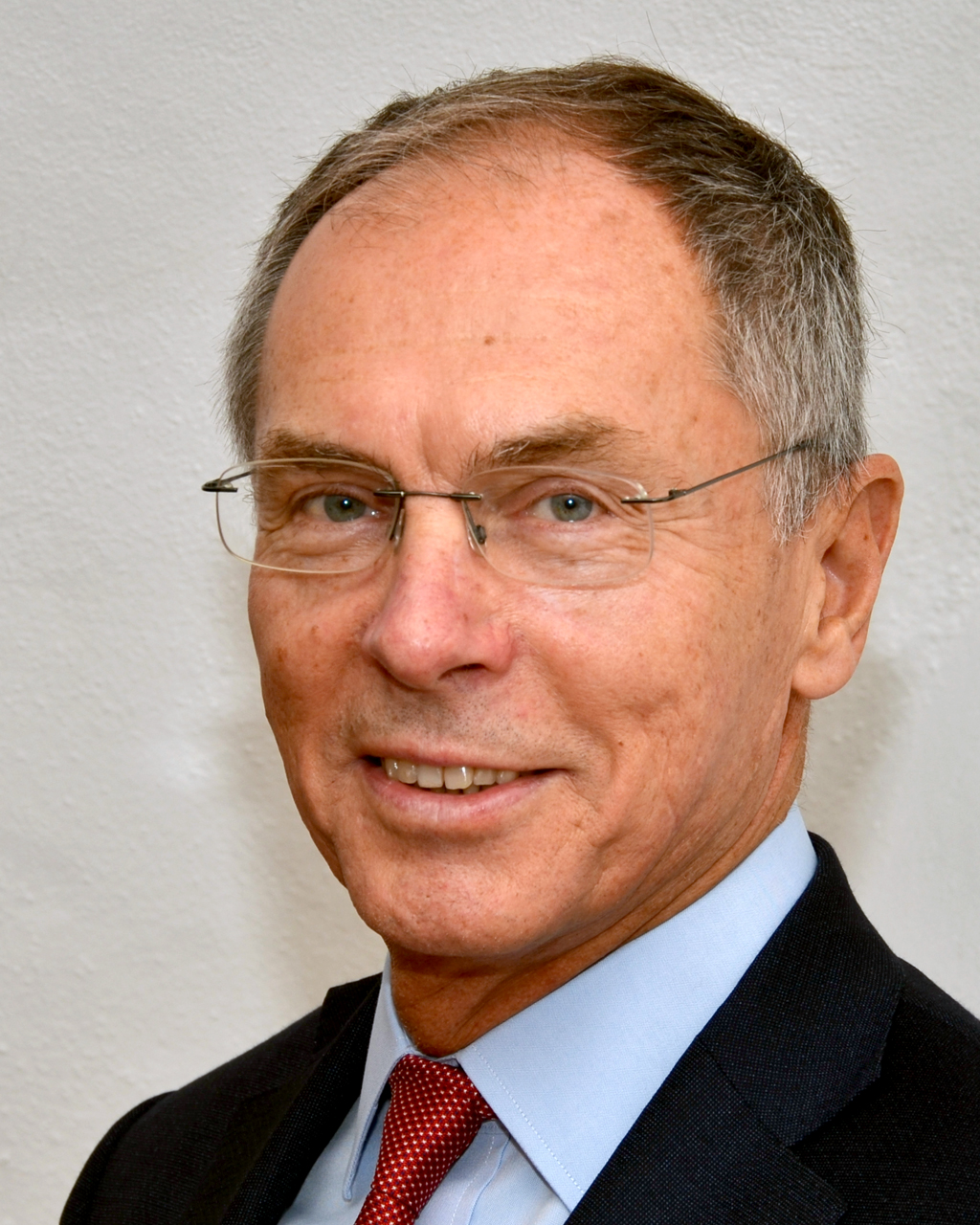
- Born: October 2, 1952 (age 73); Prague, Czechoslovakia

Academic work
- Discipline: Economics

Jan Švejnar (born October 2, 1952) is a United States-based, Czech-born economist. He was a candidate for the 2008 election of the President of the Czech Republic.

Professor Švejnar is Richard N. Gardner Professor of Economics and International Affairs and Director of the Center on Global Economic Governance at Columbia University . He is also a founder and chairman of CERGE-EI in Prague (a joint workplace of the Charles University in Prague and Economics Institute of the Academy of Sciences of the Czech Republic that offers an American-style Ph.D. program in economics that educates the new generation of economists for Central-East Europe and the Newly Independent States). He also served as the chairman of the supervisory board of ČSOB Bank (until November 2007) and co-editor of the Economics of Transition. Since 2007, he is a member of the International Advisory Council of the Center for Social and Economic Research (CASE). He is also a Fellow of the European Economic Association and research fellow of the Centre for Economic Policy Research (London) and Institute for the Study of Labor (IZA, Bonn).

== Life ==
Švejnar went into exile in 1970 and later on graduated from Cornell University with a B.S in industrial and labor relations. At Cornell, Švejnar resided at the Telluride House. He obtained a Ph.D. in economics at Princeton University. His academic interests are in the areas of economic development and transition, labor economics and behavior of the firm. His research focuses on the determinants and effects of (a) government policies on firms and labor and capital markets, (b) corporate and national governance and performance, and (c) entrepreneurship. He is the author and editor of a number of books and has published in academic, policy and practitioner-oriented journals in advanced and emerging market economies, including the American Economic Review, Econometrica, Economica, Economics of Transition, European Business Forum, European Economic Review, Journal of Comparative Economics, Journal of Development Economics, and many others.

In 2012, Švejnar was honored with a Neuron Prize for lifelong achievement from the Karel Janeček Endowment for Research and Science.

== Run for Czech presidency ==
On December 14, 2007, he announced his candidacy for the position of Czech president in the upcoming indirect presidential election. His nomination came from a proposal of 10 Senators (party affiliation – KDU-ČSL: 2, ČSSD: 3, SNK-ED: 1, independent: 4). In Parliament, his support was generally based on the Deputies and Senators elected for the Czech Social Democratic Party (ČSSD) and the Green Party.

On February 8, 2008, Švejnar faced Václav Klaus, at that time the incumbent Czech president, in the first round of presidential election held within the two chambers of the Czech Parliament. In a second round on February 9, 2008, neither candidate gained the required majority of 140 votes in both chambers together. Václav Klaus received 139 and Jan Švejnar 113 votes out of 278 votes cast in both chambers together.

In a third round on February 15, Klaus was re-elected with 141 votes out of 279 lawmakers present, one more than the required minimum, while Švejnar received 111 votes. Klaus' victory margin was supplied by 3 MPs who were elected for the ČSSD.

== Decorations ==
Awarded by Czech Republic

- Medal of Merit (2024)
