= Zuzana Roithová =

Czech politician

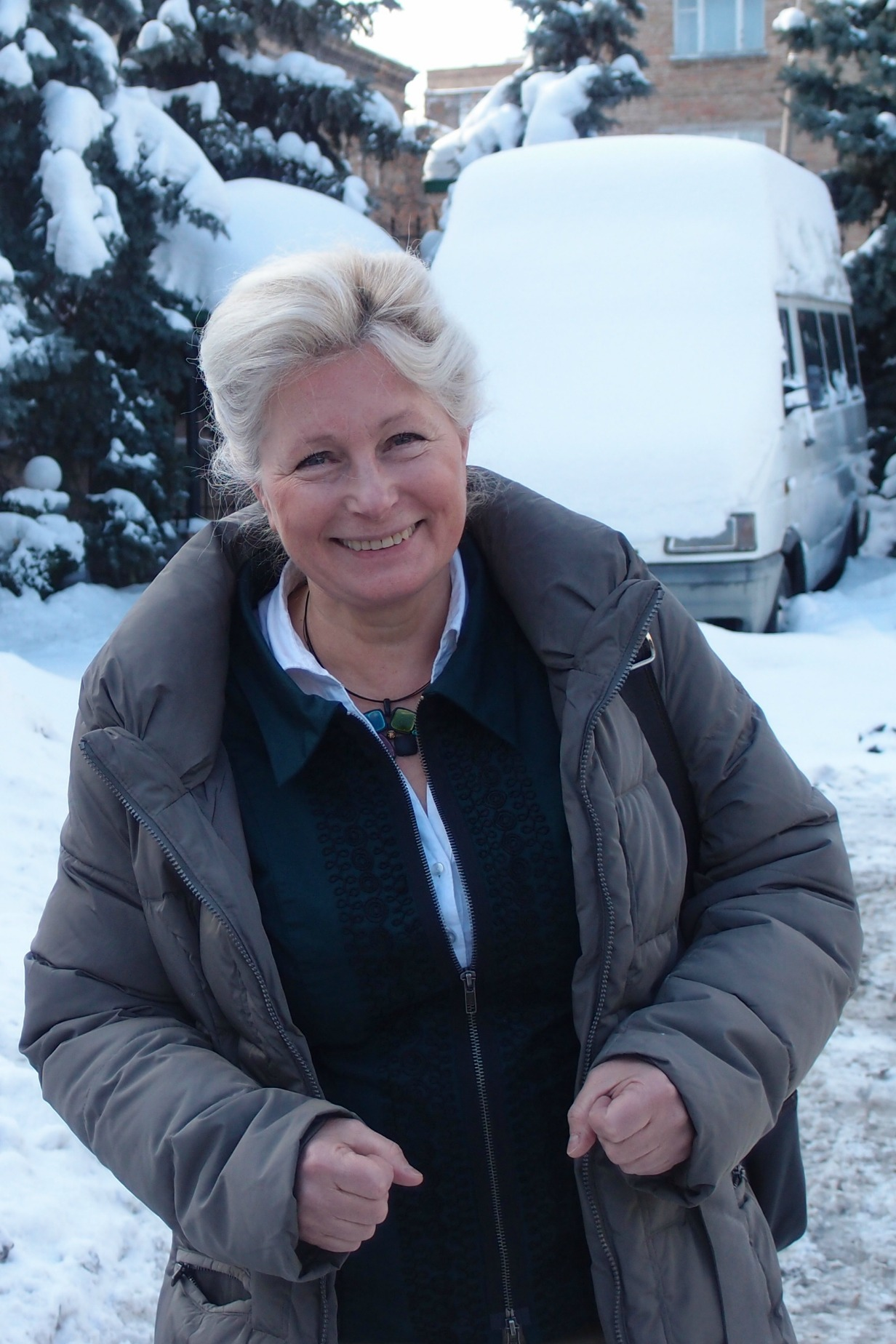

Minister of Health
- In office 2 January 1998 – 22 July 1998
- Prime Minister: Josef Tošovský
- Preceded by: Jan Stráský
- Succeeded by: Ivan David

Senator from Prague 10
- In office 21 November 1998 – 20 July 2004
- Preceded by: Milan Kondr
- Succeeded by: Jaromír Štětina

Member of the European Parliament for Czech Republic
- In office 20 July 2004 – 30 June 2014

Personal details
- Born: 30 January 1953 (age 73) Prague, Czechoslovakia (now Czech Republic)
- Party: Christian and Democratic Union-Czechoslovak People's Party
- Education: Charles University; Sheffield Hallam University

Zuzana Roithová (born 30 January 1953) is a Czech politician and former Member of the European Parliament. She was vice-chair of the European Parliament's Committee on the Internal Market and Consumer Protection, a substitute on the Committee on Women's Rights and Gender Equality and a member of the Delegation for relations with the countries of Central America.

She was a candidate in Czech presidential election 2013. In the 1st round of the election held in January 2013, she placed 6th with 4.95% (255,045 votes). She didn't qualify for the second round.

Having previously served as Minister of Health, Senator and as Chair of the European Movement in the Czech Republic, she is a signatory of the Prague Declaration on European Conscience and Communism and a member of the Reconciliation of European Histories Group.

== Personal life ==
Roithová lives in Dvory nad Lužnicí in the South Bohemian Region.

== Education ==
- 1978: Faculty of General Medicine, Charles University, Prague, Czech Republic.
- 1997: Master of Business Administration, Sheffield Hallam University, UK.
- Certificate of Professional Development in Healthcare Management (Executive Education), The Wharton School of the University of Pennsylvania, USA.

== Decorations ==
- 1998: Charles University Jubilee Medal

== Career ==
- 1979–1992: Hospital doctor
- Head of Prague Faculty Hospital (1990–1998) and Chairwoman of the Czech Association of Hospitals
- 1998: Minister of Health
- 1998–2004: Senator
- Chairwoman of the Senate Committee on Health and Social Policy (2000–2002), member of the permanent delegation of the Czech Parliament to the WEU
- 2000–2002: Chairwoman of the International European Movement in the Czech Republic
- 2001–2003: Deputy Chairwoman of KDU-ČSL (Christian Democratic Union – Czechoslovak People's Party)

== See also ==
- 2004 European Parliament election in the Czech Republic

Political offices
| Preceded by Jan Stráský | Minister of Health; 1998 | Succeeded by Ivan David |
