= Přemysl Sobotka =

Czech medical doctor and politician

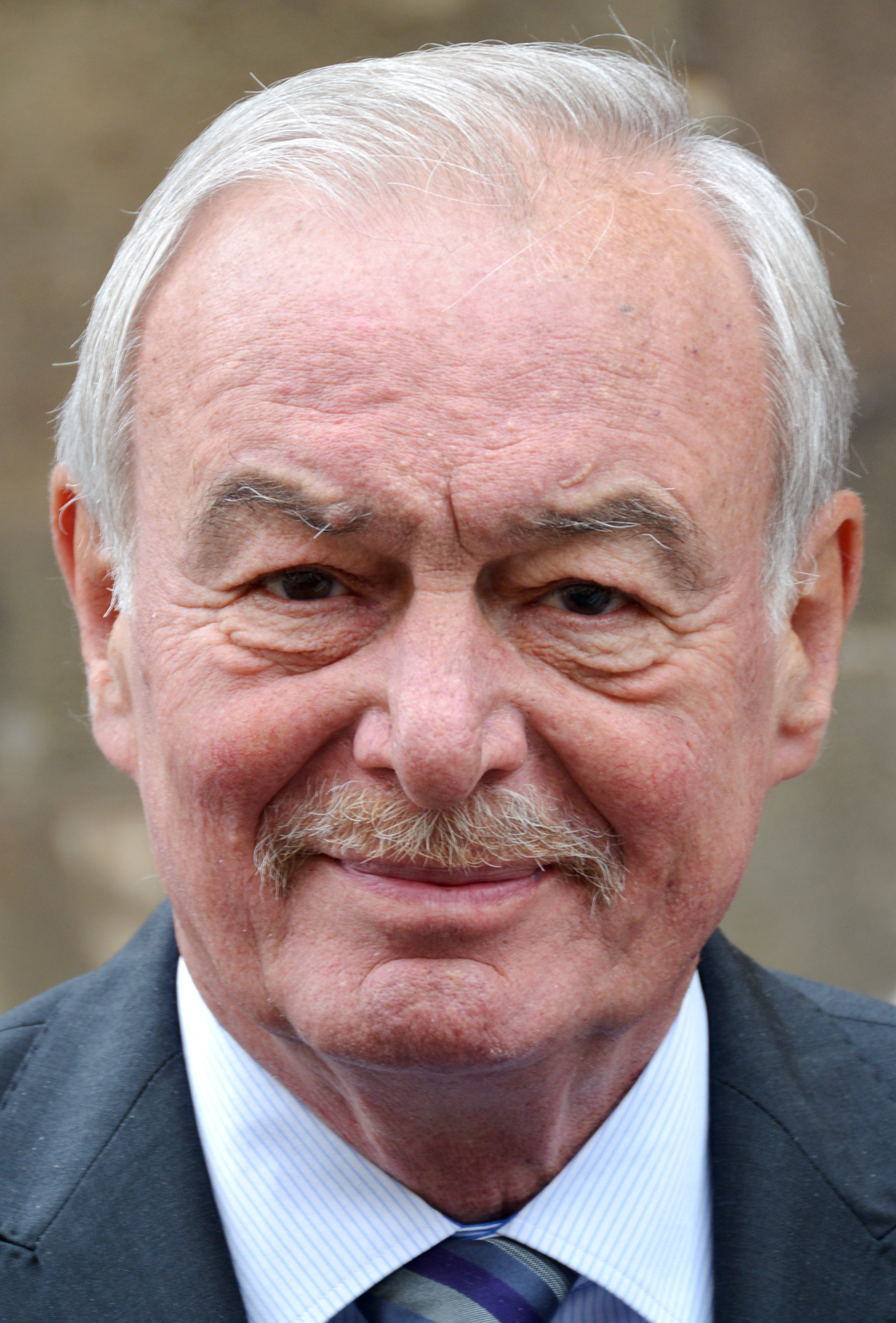
- Sobotka in 2015

President of the Czech Senate
- In office 15 December 2004 – 13 November 2010
- Preceded by: Petr Pithart
- Succeeded by: Milan Štěch

Senator from Liberec
- In office 23 November 1996 – 23 October 2016
- Preceded by: Seat established
- Succeeded by: Michael Canov

Personal details
- Born: 18 May 1944 (age 82) Mladá Boleslav, Bohemia and Moravia
- Party: Civic Democratic Party
- Spouse: Radmila Sobotková (2nd wife)
- Children: Věra Sobotková; Martina Sobotková
- Education: Charles University

Přemysl Sobotka (born 18 May 1944) is a Czech medical doctor and politician who served as the President of the Senate from 2004 to 2010.

Sobotka was a candidate in 2013 Czech presidential election, in January 2013. In the first round of the election he placed 8th with 2.46% (126,846 votes), failing to qualify for the second round.

== Early life and career ==
Sobotka was born on 18 May 1944 in Mladá Boleslav, Bohemia and Moravia (now Czech Republic). After the Nazi occupation during World War II Sobotka's family moved to Liberec, where he still lives and where his father worked as a teacher.

Sobotka graduated from the Faculty of Medicine of Charles University in 1968 as MUDr. and entered the surgical department of the Liberec Hospital, where he transferred to the X-ray department after two years. From 1991 to 1996, he was a senior consultant and Head of the Radiology Department.

== Political career ==
Sobotka's political career started in the Velvet Revolution in 1989. He was a member of the Civic Forum and joined the right-wing Civic Democratic Party after its foundation in 1991. He is a chairman of its Liberec regional organisation.

He served as councillor in the City of Liberec from 1990 to 1998. He was elected member of the Senate for the Liberec constituency for a shortened term of two years in the first Senate election held in 1996, and re-elected for two full six-year terms in 1998 and 2004. He was elected vice president of the Senate several times. He was elected president of the Senate for a two-year term on 15 December 2004, and re-elected for another two-year term in 2006.

== Personal life ==
He has two daughters from his first marriage, called Věra and Martina. He also has a stepson called Prokop from his second marriage. His wife, Radmila, worked as a nurse.
