= 2008 electoral calendar =

National and federal elections held in 2008

This electoral calendar 2008 lists the national/federal direct elections held in 2008 in the de jure and de facto sovereign states and their dependent territories. Referendums are included, even though they are not elections. By-elections are not included.

== January ==
- 5 January: Georgia, president, NATO membership referendum and election date referendum
- 7 January: Marshall Islands, President (by the parliament)
- 9 January: Kosovo, President (by the parliament)
- 12 January: Republic of China (Taiwan), Parliament and referendum
- 15 January: Barbados, Parliament
- 17–19 January: Tokelau, Parliament
- 19 January: Faroe Islands, Parliament
- 20 January: Cuba, Parliament
- 20 January: Serbia, President (1st round)
- 27 January: French Polynesia, Legislative (1st Round)
- 29 January: Bhutan, National Council

== February ==
- 3 February: Serbia, President (2nd round)
- 3 February: Monaco, Parliament
- 7 February: Belize, Legislative and referendum
- 8 February: Djibouti, Parliament
- 8–9 February: Czech Republic, President (indirect)
- 15 February: Czech Republic, President (indirect)
- 10 February: French Polynesia, Legislative (2nd Round)
- 11 February: Trinidad and Tobago, President (indirect)
- 17–19 February: Sahrawi Arab Democratic Republic, Parliament
- 17–24 February: Cyprus, President
- 18 February: Pakistan, Parliament
- 19 February: Armenia, President
- 24 February: French Polynesia, President (indirect)
- 24 February: Cuba, President (indirect)
- 24 February: Switzerland, Referendum
- October 2007 until February 2008: PR China, National People's Congress

== March ==
- 2 March: Russia, President
- 2 March: Thailand, Senate
- 8 March: Malaysia, Parliament
- 8 March: Malta, Parliament
- 9 March: Spain, Parliament
- 9 March: Hungary, Referendum against government reforms
- 9/16 March: Mayotte, Legislative
- 14 March: Iran, Legislative (1st round)
- 15 March: PR China, President (indirect)
- 22 March: Republic of China (Taiwan), President and UN membership referendum
- 24 March: Bhutan, Parliament
- 29 March: Zimbabwe, President (1st round) and Parliament

== April ==
- 6 April: Montenegro, President
- 9 April: South Korea, Parliament
- 10 April: Nepal, Constituent Assembly
- 13–14 April: Italy, Parliament
- 20 April: Paraguay, General
- 23 April: Guernsey, General
- 23–24 April: Tonga, General
- 25 April: Iran, Legislative (2nd round)
- 26 April: Nauru, Parliament
- 30 April: Tuvalu, Constitutional referendum

== May ==
- 4 May: Equatorial Guinea, Parliament
- 10 and 24 May: Burma/Myanmar, Constitutional referendum
- 11 May: Serbia, Parliament
- 16 May: Dominican Republic, President
- 17 May: Kuwait, Parliament
- 21 May: Georgia, Legislative
- 25 May: Lebanon, President (by the parliament)

== June ==
- 1 June: Switzerland, Referendum
- 1 June: Macedonia, Assembly
- 7 June: Niue, Parliament
- 12 June: Ireland, Treaty of Lisbon referendum
- 22 June: Slovenia, Regionalisation referendum
- 27 June: Zimbabwe, President (2nd round)
- 29 June: Mongolia, Legislative

== July ==
- 8 July: Grenada, Parliament
- 19 July: Nepal, President (1st round) (by the parliament)
- 21 July: Nepal, President (2nd round) (by the parliament)
- 27 July: Cambodia, Parliament

== August ==
- 2 August: Latvia, Constitutional referendum
- 5 August: Republic of the Congo, Senate (indirect)
- 10 August: Bolivia, Recall referendum
- 23 August: Latvia, Pensions law referendum

== September ==
- 2 September: Vanuatu, Parliament
- 5–6 September: Angola, Legislature
- 6 September: Pakistan, President (indirect)
- 7 September: Hong Kong, Legislature
- 15–18 September: Rwanda, Parliament
- 19 September: Swaziland, Parliament
- 19 September: Mauritius, President (indirect)
- 21 September: Slovenia, Parliament
- 21 September: France, Senate (third of the seats) (indirect)
- 25 September: South Africa, President (by the parliament)
- 28 September: Ecuador, Constitutional referendum
- 28 September: Austria, Parliament
- 28 September: Belarus, Parliament

== October ==
- 8 October: Maldives, President (1st Round)
- 12 October: Lithuania, Parliament (1st Round) and nuclear power referendum
- 14 October: Canada, Parliament
- 15 October: Azerbaijan, President
- 15 October: Jersey, General (1st Round) and Central European Time referendum
- 17/18 October: Czech Republic, Senate (one third)
- 24/25 October: Czech Republic, Senate (one third)
- 26 October: Lithuania, Parliament (2nd Round)
- 29 October: Maldives, President (2nd Round)
- 30 October: Zambia, President

== November ==
- 4 November: United States, President, House of Representatives, Senate (one third: Class 2 senators), Governor (11)
  - 4 November: American Samoa, Governor (1st Round), Legislative
  - 4 November: Guam, Legislative
  - 4 November: Puerto Rico, Governor, Legislative
  - 4 November: United States Virgin Islands, Legislative
- 4 November: Palau, President, Senate and House of Delegates
- 8 November: New Zealand, General
- 9 November: San Marino, Parliament
- 16 November: Guinea-Bissau, Parliament
- 18 November: American Samoa, Governor (2nd Round)
- 25 November: Greenland, Self-government referendum
- 26 November: Jersey, General (2nd Round)
- 30 November: Romania, Legislative
- 30 November: Switzerland, Referendum

== December ==
- 7 December: Ghana, President (1st Round) and Parliament
- 10 December: Switzerland, Federal Council (indirect)
- 14 December: Turkmenistan, Parliament (1st Round)
- 28 December: Ghana, President (2nd Round)
- 28 December: Turkmenistan, Parliament (2nd Round)
- 29 December: Bangladesh, General
