= 2008 presidential election =

2008 presidential election may refer to:

- 2008 Armenian presidential election
- 2008 Azerbaijani presidential election
- 2008 People's Republic of China presidential election
- 2008 Cypriot presidential election
- 2008 Czech presidential election
- 2008 Dominican Republic presidential election
- 2008 French Polynesian presidential election
- 2008 Ghanaian presidential election
- 2008 Kosovan presidential election
- 2008 Lebanese presidential election
- 2008 Maldivian presidential election
- 2008 Marshall Islands presidential election
- 2008 Mauritian presidential election
- 2008 Montenegrin presidential election
- 2008 Nepalese presidential election
- 2008 Pakistani presidential election
- 2008 Palauan presidential election
- 2008 Russian presidential election
- 2008 Serbian presidential election
- 2008 Taiwan presidential election
- 2008 Trinidad and Tobago presidential election
- 2008 United States presidential election
- 2008 Zimbabwean presidential election

== See also ==
- Electoral calendar 2008
- Category:2008 elections
