= Politics of Latvia =

The politics of Latvia takes place in a framework of a parliamentary representative democratic republic, whereby the prime minister is the head of government, and of a multi-party system. The President holds a primarily ceremonial role as Head of State. Executive power is exercised by the government. Legislative power is vested in both the government and parliament, the Saeima. The Judiciary is independent of the executive and the legislature. The Economist Intelligence Unit rated Latvia a "flawed democracy" in 2022.

== Political developments since independence ==
On March 19, 1991, the Supreme Council passed a law explicitly guaranteeing "equal rights to all nationalities and ethnic groups" and "guarantees to all permanent residents in the Republic regardless of their nationality, equal rights to work and wages." The law also prohibits "any activity directed toward nationality discrimination or the promotion of national superiority or hatred."

In autumn 1992 Latvia re-implemented significant portions of its 1922 constitution and in spring 1993 the government took a census to determine eligibility for citizenship. After almost three years of deliberations, Latvia finalized a citizenship and naturalization law in summer 1994.

In the 5–6 June 1993 elections, with a turnout of over 90%, eight of Latvia's 23 registered political parties passed the four per cent threshold to enter parliament. The Popular Front, which spearheaded the drive for independence two years previously with a 75% majority in the last parliamentary elections in 1990, did not qualify for representation. The centrist Latvian Way party received a 33% plurality of votes and joined with the Farmer's Union to head a centre-right coalition government.

Led by the opposition National Conservative Party, right-wing nationalists won a majority of the seats nationwide and also captured the Riga mayoralty in the 29 May 1994 municipal elections. OSCE and COE observers pronounced the elections free and fair, and turnout averaged about 60%. In February 1995, the Council of Europe granted Latvia membership.

With President Bill Clinton's assistance, on 30 April 1994 Latvia and Russia signed a troop withdrawal agreement. Russia withdrew its troops by 31 August 1994 but maintained several hundred technical specialists to staff an OSCE-monitored phased-array ABM radar station at Skrunda until 31 August 1998.

The 30 September-1 October 1995 elections produced a deeply fragmented parliament with nine parties represented and the largest party – the newly founded centrist Democratic Party "Saimnieks" – commanding only 18 of 100 seats. Attempts to form right-of-centre and left-wing governments failed; 7 weeks after the election, a broad but fractious coalition government of six of the nine parties was voted into office under Prime Minister Andris Šķēle, a nonpartisan businessman. The also-popular president, Guntis Ulmanis, had limited constitutional powers but played a key role in leading the various political forces to agree finally to this broad coalition. In June 1996, the Saeima re-elected Ulmanis to another 3-year term. In the summer of 1997, the daily newspaper Diena revealed that half the cabinet ministers and two-thirds of parliamentarians appeared to violate the 1996 anti-corruption law, which bars senior officials from holding positions in private business. Under pressure from Šķēle, several ministers subsequently resigned or were fired. However, after months of increasing hostility between Šķēle and leading coalition politicians, the coalition parties demanded and received the prime minister's resignation on 28 July. The new government was formed by the recent Minister of Economy Guntars Krasts. It included the same parties and mostly the same ministers as Šķēle's government. It pursued the same course of reform, albeit not as vigorously.

In the 1998 elections, the Latvian party structure began to consolidate with only six parties winning seats in the Saeima. Andris Šķēle's newly formed People's Party garnered a plurality with 24 seats. Though the election represented a victory for the centre-right, personality conflicts and scandals within the two largest right of centre parties – Latvian Way and the People's Party – prevented stable coalitions from forming. Two shaky governments under Vilis Krištopans and Andris Šķēle quickly collapsed in less than a year. In May 2000, a compromise candidate was found in the form of Andris Bērziņš, the Latvian Way mayor of Rīga. His four-party coalition government lasted till the next elections in 2002.

In 1999, the Saeima elected Vaira Vīķe-Freiberga, a compromise candidate with no party affiliation, to the presidency. Though born in Rīga in 1937, she settled in Canada during the years of the Soviet occupation, becoming a well-respected academic in the subject of Latvian culture. Since her election, she has become one of the most popular political figures in Latvia.

Local elections in 2001 represented a victory for the left-of-center parties in several municipalities, including Rīga. A leftist coalition in the Rīga City Council elected Gundars Bojārs, a Social Democrat, to the office of mayor.

Between local elections in 2001 and Saeima elections in 2002, two new parties formed: the conservative New Era Party led by Einars Repše and Christian Democratic Latvia's First Party. Both of them promised to fight corruption and made that the most important issue in the 2002 elections. Six parties were elected to Saeima in 2002 elections. New Era Party with 26 seats out of 100 became the largest party in the parliament. Several previously successful parties such as Latvian Way and the Social Democrats did not reach the 5% threshold of the popular vote needed to be in the parliament. This was mostly due to voters perceiving these parties as corrupt. After elections, Einars Repše formed a government consisting of his New Era Party and three other parties.

In 2003, Vaira Vīķe-Freiberga was re-elected to the presidency for the second term, until 2007. On 20 September 2003, Latvia voted to join the European Union in a referendum. Virtually all of the major political parties and major Latvian-language media supported the 'YES' vote. Latvian government also spent a significant amount of money for the 'YES' campaign. The 'NO' campaign lacked both funding and media access. Out of voters who participated in the referendum, 66.9% of cast votes in favour of EU. The vote was largely along the ethnic lines. It is estimated that 84% of ethnic Latvians voted 'YES', while 91% of ethnic Russians voted 'NO'.

After the referendum, Repše's government started to fall apart and he eventually resigned in January 2004. A new government, led by Indulis Emsis, head of the conservative Union of Greens and Farmers (ZZS) was approved by the parliament in March 2004. The government was a coalition of the ZZS, the People's Party (TP), and the Latvia's First Party (LPP); the coalition had only 46 out of 100 seats in Latvia's parliament, but was also supported by the leftist National Harmony Party (TSP). After the Saeima did not accept the budget for 2005 proposed by the government of Indulis Emsis, the government resigned. On 2 December 2004, Aigars Kalvītis became the new prime minister and thus head of the government.

Kalvītis was the first prime minister in the history of post-soviet independent Latvia whose government was reelected by an election in 2006. New Era Party, however, weakened, so a coalition reshuffle took place, and a 4-party centre-right coalition emerged. The government lasted only until 5 December 2007, when Kalvitis resigned due to his continuous and unsuccessful attempts to dismiss Aleksejs Loskutovs, the head of KNAB, the State Anti-Corruption Agency, after Loskutovs had investigated shadowy matters of the PM's party.

After negotiations, a "crisis-handling" government was formed, with the participation of the same parties, led by former PM Ivars Godmanis, a respectable public figure, and member of Latvian Way. The government tried to impose austerity measures, with moderate success. This was accompanied, though, with a widespread public opposition, which resulted in two referendums, one on pensions, the other on constitutional amendments, which would have allowed the electorate to initiate the dissolution of the parliament.

Both of the referendums failed, but the country entered into the worst political crisis since the independence from the Soviet Union, together with the economic situation severely deteriorating, due to the world financial crisis. The popularity of the governing parties melted and was below the parliamentary threshold. By the end of 2008, parties had a hard time agreeing on further budget cuts, (mainly in the social sphere) the planned reorganization of the government, and layoffs.

On 13 January 2009, there were severe riots in Riga, with protesters attacking the building of the parliament. The President Valdis Zatlers gave an ultimatum to parties, saying that should they not agree on constitutional amendments about the dissolution of the Saeima, he would dissolve the parliament by the end of March. After background talks and a failed vote of no confidence, PM Ivars Godmanis chose to resign in late February. On the 26 February, Zatlers nominated the candidate of New Era Party, MEP Valdis Dombrovskis to the post of prime minister. After talks, on 4 March 2009 five parties confirmed their participation in the coalition: New Era, People's Party, Union of Greens and Peasants, For Fatherland and Freedom/LNNK, and Civic Union.

In 2010 parliamentary election ruling centre-right coalition won 63 out of 100 parliamentary seats. Left-wing opposition Harmony Centre supported by Latvia's Russian-speaking minority got 29 seats. In 2014 parliamentary election was won again by the ruling centre-right coalition formed by the Unity Party, the National Alliance and the Union of Greens and Farmers. They got 61 seats and Harmony got 24. In 2018 parliamentary election pro-Russian Harmony (former Harmony Centre) was again the biggest party securing 23 out of 100 seats. the second and third were the populist KPV LV and New Conservative Party. Ruling coalition, comprising the Union of Greens and Farmers, the National Alliance and the Unity party, lost.

In November 2013, Latvian prime minister Valdis Dombrovskis, in office since 2009, resigned after at least 54 people were killed and dozens injured in the collapse at a supermarket in Riga. In December 2015, country's first female prime minister, in office since January 2014, Laimdota Straujuma resigned. In February 2016, a coalition of Union of Greens and Farmers, The Unity and National Alliance was formed by new prime minister Maris Kucinskis. In January 2019, Latvia got a government led by new prime minister Krisjanis Karins of the centre-right New Unity. Karins' coalition was formed by five of the seven parties in parliament, excluding only the pro-Russia Harmony party and the Union of Greens and Farmers.

On 15 September 2023, Evika Siliņa became the new prime minister of Latvia, following resignation of former prime minister Krišjānis Kariņš previous month. Siliņa’s government is a three-party coalition between her own New Unity (JV) party, the Greens and Farmers Union (ZZS), and the social-democratic Progressives (PRO) with total 52 of 100 seats in the 2022 Latvian parliamentary election. Harmony, the former largest political party in the Saeima, lost all its seats. Some former Harmony supporters appeared to support for a new Eurosceptic populist party, For Stability!, that split from Harmony in 2021.

== Citizenship and language issues ==
The current edition of the citizenship law was adopted in 1998 after much debate and pressure from Russia and European Union, amending a more restrictive law, initially passed in 1994. In accordance with the law, Latvian citizens are those who had Latvian citizenship prior to June 17, 1940, and their descendants. Those who settled in Latvia during the Soviet occupation, with exception of those who did so subsequent to retirement from the Soviet Army, or were employees, informers, agents or safehouse keepers of the KGB, or of the security services, intelligence services or other special services of some other foreign state, can obtain Latvian citizenship via naturalization. Other categories of persons not eligible for naturalization include convicted criminals, state officials and servicemen of armed forces of a foreign state, members of Communist Party as well as members of certain affiliate organizations, who, after 13 January 1991, have acted against the Latvian State. Naturalization criteria include a conversational knowledge of Latvian, an oath of loyalty, renunciation of former citizenship, a 5-year residency requirement, and a knowledge of the Latvian constitution. As of November 2005, about 109,000 persons applied for naturalization and about 103,000 of them were granted Latvian citizenship.

In 2006, approximately 18 per cent of the total population (420,000 inhabitants of Latvia, slightly less than half of ethnically non-Latvian population) had no Latvian citizenship. Most of them have Latvian non-Citizen Passports, which give them a status similar to permanent residency in other countries. They can reside in Latvia indefinitely and obtain most of the public services (e.g., education and healthcare) according to the same conditions as the citizens of Latvia. Non-citizens of Latvia cannot vote during municipal and state elections and are not allowed to work in government, the police and civil services. Several foreign nations also treat citizens and non-citizens of Latvia differently, admitting citizens of Latvia without a visa but requiring visas from non-citizens. Russia used to have the opposite practice, requiring visas from both citizens and non-citizens of Latvia, but allowing non-citizens to travel to Russia with a cheaper visa.

As a transitional clause, the Latvian law allows dual citizenship for those who were forced to leave Latvia during the Soviet or Nazi occupation and adopted another citizenship while away from Latvia. In order to be eligible for dual citizenship, they had to claim it by July 1, 1995. After that date the other citizenship must be renounced upon the acceptance of Latvian citizenship.

Latvian is the sole state language in Latvia; while the threatened Livonian language is recognized as "the language of the indigenous (autochthon) population". The Latgalian written language is also protected "as a historic variant of the Latvian language." All other languages are considered foreign by the law on state languages. Two parliamentary parties, Harmony Centre and ForHRUL, have requested that Russian (26.9% of inhabitants, according to the 2011 census, are Russians) be given official status.

Since 1999, the education laws have forbidden the public universities to instruct students in languages other than Latvian (there are exclusions made for linguistics, some international projects and non-budget groups). The law included a provision allowing for instruction in Latvian only in public high schools since 2004. Following large-scale protests in 2003—2004 organized by the Headquarters for the Protection of Russian Schools, the law was amended, requiring instruction in Latvian within at least 60% of the curriculum.

== Executive branch ==
Main office-holders
Office	Name	Party	Since
President	Edgars Rinkēvičs	Independent	8 July 2023
Prime Minister	Evika Siliņa	Unity	15 September 2023

The president is elected by Parliament for a maximum of two terms of four years, by secret ballot and by an absolute majority of the vote (Constitution of Latvia, Articles 35, 36 and 39).

The president is a largely ceremonial head of state, and in common with other presidents in parliamentary republics, the President of Latvia has influence and authority rather than power.

Although the president is formally the commander-in-chief of the armed forces, signs treaties, represents Latvia abroad, and officially appoints ambassadors and other key officials, these powers are constitutionally exercised on the binding advice of the prime minister, who is politically responsible for them (Constitution of Latvia, Article 53). The president does, however, have personal discretion over the proposal of legislation to the Parliament, vetoing legislation, calling referendums on legislation, and nominating the prime minister. The president also has the right, in extremis, to call a referendum on the premature dissolution of Parliament: if the referendum is passed, Parliament is dissolved; but if the referendum fails, the president must resign.

The prime minister is appointed by the president. The prime minister then chooses the Council of Ministers (Cabinet) which has to be accepted by the Parliament. The Parliament can remove the prime minister and Cabinet by means of a vote of no-confidence (Constitution of Latvia, Article 59).

== Legislative branch ==
The unicameral Parliament (Saeima) has 100 members, elected for a four-year term by proportional representation with a 5% threshold. The parliamentary elections are held on the first Saturday of October. Locally, Latvia elects municipal councils, consisting of 7 to 60 members, depending on the size of the municipality, also by proportional representation for a four-year term.

== Political parties and elections ==
Summary of the 1 October 2022 Latvian Saeima election results

Party	%	Seats	+/–
JV	19.19	26	+18
ZZS	12.58	16	+5
AS	11.14	16	New
NA	9.40	13	0
For Stability!	6.88	11	New
LPV	6.31	9	New
PRO	6.21	10	+10
Source: CVK

== Judicial branch ==
Judges' appointments are confirmed by Parliament and are irrevocable, except on the decision of the Judicial Disciplinary Board or on the judgment of a criminal court. There is a special Constitutional Court, with the authority to rule on the constitutionality of laws, whose members must be confirmed by an absolute majority vote of Parliament, by secret ballot.

== International organization participation ==
BIS, CBSS, CE, EAPC, EBRD, ECE, EU, FAO, IAEA, IBRD, ICAO, ICC, ICRM, IDA, IFC, IFRCS, ILO, IMF, IMO, ITUC, Intelsat (nonsignatory user), Interpol, IOC, IOM (observer), ISO (correspondent), ITU, NATO, NSG, OAS (observer), OECD, OPCW, OSCE, United Nations, UNCTAD, UNESCO, UNIDO, UPU, WCO, WEU (associate partner), WHO, WIPO, WMO, WTO, WTrO (applicant)

== Opinion polls ==
Main political issues in Latvia were health care access, cost of living, waste of public funds and economic development according to a 2026 SKDS opinion poll.
