= Elections in Latvia =

Latvia elects on the national level a legislature. The Saeima has 100 members, elected for a four-year term by proportional representation with a 5% threshold. An unmodified Sainte-Laguë method is used to allocate seats. The parliamentary elections are held on the first Saturday of October. Locally, Latvia elects municipal councils, consisting of 7 to 60 members, depending on the size of the municipality, also by proportional representation for a four-year term.

Latvia has a multi-party system, with numerous parties in which no one party often has a chance of gaining power alone, and parties must work with each other to form coalition governments.

== 2022 parliamentary election ==
Latvian parliamentary elections from 1993 graph

A parliamentary election was held on 1 October 2022.

Party	Votes	%	Seats	+/–
New Unity	173,425	19.19	26	+18
Union of Greens and Farmers	113,676	12.58	16	+5
United List	100,631	11.14	15	New
National Alliance	84,939	9.40	13	0
For Stability!	62,168	6.88	11	New
Latvia First	57,033	6.31	9	New
The Progressives	56,327	6.23	10	+10
Development/For!	45,452	5.03	0	–13
Harmony	43,943	4.86	0	–23
For Each and Every One	33,578	3.72	0	New
Latvian Russian Union	33,203	3.67	0	0
Sovereign Power	29,603	3.28	0	New
The Conservatives	28,270	3.13	0	–16
Republic	16,088	1.78	0	New
Force of People's Power	10,350	1.15	0	New
People's Servants for Latvia	9,176	1.02	0	0
Union for Latvia	2,985	0.33	0	–16
United for Latvia	1,413	0.16	0	New
Progressive Christian Party	1,379	0.15	0	New
Total	903,639	100.00	100	0
Valid votes	903,639	98.58		
Invalid/blank votes	13,052	1.42		
Total votes	916,691	100.00		
Registered voters/turnout	1,542,407	59.43		
Source: Central Electoral Commission

== Referendums ==
The Constitution of Latvia prescribes a referendum for five purposes:

- recalling of the Parliament (Article 14)
- acceding to the European Union (Article 68)
- accepting substantial changes in the terms regarding the membership in the European Union (if requested by 50% of the Parliament) (Article 68)
- accepting legislation suspended by the President (Article 72)
- amending the Constitution or adopting a law (Article 78)

One tenth of registered voters have the right to initiate a national referendum regarding recalling of the Parliament. Voter turnout needed is two thirds of the number of the voters who participated in the last elections for the Parliament. The Constitution imposes several restrictions on when the recall referendum can be held. It cannot be held:

- one year after the parliamentary elections
- one year before the parliamentary elections
- six months before the presidential elections
- six months after the last recall referendum.

There has been one such referendum, the parliamentary dissolution referendum of 2011.

Substantial changes in the terms regarding Latvia's membership of the European Union must be decided by a national referendum if such a referendum is requested by at least one-half of the members of the Parliament.

In certain cases the President or one third of members of the Parliament have the right to suspend the proclamation of a law for a period of two months. A referendum will be held on that law if in that two-month period one tenth of the electorate requests a referendum, except if the Parliament again adopts the law by three three-quarters super-majority. Voter turnout needed is 50% of the number of voters who participated in the last elections for the Parliament. If no referendum is requested in the two-month period, then the law is put into effect. Such a referendum has been held on three occasions: in 1998, 1999 and 2007

The Constitution limits issues which can be submitted to a referendum. It forbids issues like budgets, taxes, military conscription, declarations of war, peace treaties, agreements with other nations, etc.

One tenth of the electorate can request amendment of the Constitution or adoption of a law. If the Parliament does not accept the amendment or the draft law, then it will be submitted to a referendum. Certain parts of the Constitution can be amended only by a referendum. An absolute majority (majority of all electors, regardless of voter turnout) is required for an amendment or a draft law to pass on such a referendum. The exception is decisions regarding Latvia's membership of the EU or substantial changes in the terms of membership of the EU - those measures need a voter turnout of 50% of the number of voters who participated in the last elections for the Parliament. Amendments to the Constitution have been put to a referendum in 2 cases: in 2008 and 2012; the same was done for a draft law in 2008 and a European Union membership referendum was held in 2003.

There have been 13 referendums in Latvia's history: 4 in the 1923–1934 period and 9 since 1991.

== European elections ==
- European Parliament election, 2004
- European Parliament election, 2009
- European Parliament election, 2014
- European Parliament election, 2019
- European Parliament election, 2024

== See also ==
- Electoral calendar
- Electoral system
