= 1985 Nepal bombings =

Terrorist attack

- Location: Nepal: Kathmandu; Jhapa; Pokhara; Biratnagar; Janakpur; Birgunj; Mahendranagar; Nepalganj; Bhairahawa Airport
- Date: 20 June 1985
- Target: Civilians
- Weapon: Bombings
- Deaths: 8
- Perpetrator: Nepal Janabadi Morcha

A series of coordinated bomb blasts occurred on 20 June 1985 in Kathmandu and other cities in Nepal. This spate of bomb attacks was the first of its kind in the country. In total, at least eight people (including a Member of Parliament) were killed. Several people were injured.

== Kathmandu ==
In Kathmandu bombs went off at the Royal Palace (southern and western gates), the reception hall of Hotel de l'Annapura (owned by the royal family), at the main gate of the National Panchayat Secretariat and Singh Durbar.

== Other parts of the country ==
Outside of Kathmandu, bombs detonated in Jhapa, Pokhara, Biratnagar, Janakpur, Birgunj, Mahendranagar, Nepalganj and at Bhairahawa Airport.

== Aftermath ==
Two exiled groups claimed responsibility for the bombings. One of the groups claiming responsibility was the Nepal Janabadi Morcha of Ram Raja Prasad Singh.

In the aftermath of the bombings mass arrests took place (according to one source some 1,400 people were arrested). Laxman Bisheshwar Mandal and Prem Bahadur Vishwakarma were sentenced to death; Khemraj Bhatta 'Mayalu' was sentenced to life imprisonment. Five other NJM leaders were caught and died in custody. The government launched a new strict criminal law in response to the bombings, the Destructive Crimes (Special Control and Punishment) Act. The bombings also prompted the mainstream opposition, the Nepali Congress, to call off its satyagraha (civil disobedience) campaign that had been launched on May 23, 1985. At the time, there were persistent rumours that monarchist hardliners could have been involved in the incidents, in order to discredit the ongoing civil opposition campaign.
