= Open list =

Personalized list proportional voting system

Countries using open-list proportional representation as of 2026: Countries where all parties use an open list Countries where most parties use an open list Varies by state

Open list describes any variant of party-list proportional representation where voters have at least some influence on the order in which a party's candidates are elected on the list. This is as opposed to closed list, in which party lists are in a predetermined, fixed order by the time of the election and gives the general voter no influence at all on the position of the candidates placed on the party list.

An open list system allows voters to select individuals rather than, or in addition to parties, with some systems even allowing voters to vote for candidates of multiple parties (free list). Open list systems can be described as votes for individuals being pooled by party for the purposes of seat distribution. In all open list systems voters may vote for candidates and seats are primarily distributed to parties, then seats won by parties are given to candidates. The voter's candidate choices are usually called preference vote; the voters are usually allowed one or more preference votes for the open list candidates. Different systems give the voter different amounts of influence to change the default ranking (with not fully open list systems also called flexible lists).

Open lists differ from mixed-member proportional representation, also known as personalized proportional representation in Germany. Some mixed electoral systems also use open lists in their list-proportional representation component. Open lists can increase the personalization of politics due to intra- and inter-party electoral competition, as well as identity politics.

== Variants ==
=== Relatively closed variants ===
A relatively closed open list system is one where a candidate must reach a full electoral quota of votes on their own to be assured of winning a seat. The total number of seats won by the party minus the number of its candidates that achieved this quota gives the number of unfilled seats. These are then successively allocated to the party's not-yet-elected candidates who were ranked highest on the party list.

==== Iceland ====
In both parliamentary and municipal elections, voters may alter the order of the party list or strike candidates from the list completely. How many votes need to be altered in this way to have an effect on the results varies by the number of seats won by the party in the constituency or municipality in question and the candidate's place on the list. In the parliamentary elections of 2007 and 2009, voters altered the party lists enough to change the ranking of candidates within party lists; however, this did not affect which candidates ultimately got elected to parliament.

=== More open variants ===
In a "more open" list system, the quota for election of an individual representative could be lowered from the above amount. It is then possible that more of a party's candidates achieve this quota than the total seats won by the party. It should therefore be made clear in advance whether list ranking or absolute votes take precedence in that case. The quota for individuals is usually specified either as a percentage of the party list quota, or as a percentage of the total votes received by the party. In one example, the quota is 1,000 votes and the open list threshold is specified as 25% of the quota, i.e. 250 votes. Therefore, a party that received 5,000 votes wins five seats, which are awarded to its list candidates as follows.

| Candidate position on the list | Preference votes | 25% of the quota | Elected |
|---|---|---|---|
| 1 | 3,500 | x (first) | x |
| 2 | 50 | | x |
| 3 | 150 | | x |
| 4 | 250 | x (third) | x |
| 5 | 100 | | |
| 6 | 100 | | |
| 7 | 450 | x (second) | x |
| 8 | 50 | | |
$\vdots$

Candidates No. 1, 7, and 4 have each achieved 25% of the quota (250 preference votes or more). They get the first three of the five seats the party has won. The other two seats will be taken by No. 2 and 3, the two highest remaining positions on the party list. This means that No. 5 is not elected even though being the fifth on the list and having more preference votes than No. 2. In practice, with such a strict threshold, only very few candidates succeed to precede on their lists as the required number of votes is huge. Where the threshold is lower (e.g. in Czech parliamentary elections, 5% of the total party vote is the required minimum), results defying the original list order are much more common. Parties usually allow candidates to ask for preference votes, but without campaigning negatively against other candidates on the list. In some countries individual political parties can choose if their list is open or closed.

==== Austria ====
The members of the National Council are elected by open list proportional representation in nine multi-member constituencies based on the states (with varying in size from 7 to 36 seats) and 39 districts. Voters are able to cast a single party vote and one preference votes each on the federal, state and electoral district level for their preferred candidates within that party. The thresholds for a candidate to move up the list are 7% of the candidate's party result on the federal level, 10% on the state level and 14% on the electoral district level. Candidates for the district level are listed on the ballot while voters need to write-in their preferred candidate on state and federal level.

==== Croatia ====
In Croatia, the voter can give their vote to a single candidate on the list, but only candidates who have received at least 10% of the party's votes take precedence over the other candidates on the list.

==== Czech Republic ====
In Czech parliamentary elections, voters are given 4 preference votes. Only candidates who have received more than 5% of preferential votes at the regional level take precedence over the list. For elections to the European Parliament, the procedure is identical but each voter is only allowed 2 preference votes.

==== Indonesia ====
In Indonesia, any candidate who has obtained at least 30% of the quota is automatically elected.

==== Netherlands ====
In the Netherlands, the voter can give their vote to any candidate in a list (for example, in elections for the House of Representatives); the vote for this candidate is called a "preference vote" (voorkeurstem in Dutch). Candidates with at least 25% of the quota takes priority over the party's other candidates who stand higher on the party list but received fewer preference votes. Most people vote for the top candidate, to indicate no special preference for any individual candidate, but support for the party in general; however, people sometimes want to express their support for a particular person. For example, some people vote for the first woman on the list. If a candidate gathers enough preference votes, then they get a seat in parliament, even if their position on the list would leave them without a seat. In the 2003 elections Hilbrand Nawijn, the former minister of migration and integration, was elected into parliament for the Pim Fortuyn List by preference votes even though he was the last candidate on the list.

==== Slovakia ====
In Slovakia, each voter may, in addition to the party, select one to four candidates from the ordered party list. Candidates who are selected by more than 3% of the party's voters are elected (in order of total number of votes) first and only then is the party ordering used. For European elections, voters select two candidates and the candidates must have more than 10% of the total votes to override the party list. In the European election in 2009 three of Slovakia's thirteen MEPs were elected solely by virtue of preference votes (having party-list positions too low to have won otherwise) and only one (Katarína Neveďalová of SMER) was elected solely by virtue of her position on the party list (having fewer preference votes than a number of other candidates who themselves, nevertheless had preferences from fewer than 10 percent of their party's voters).

==== Sweden ====
In Sweden, a candidate needs to receive 5% of the party's votes for the personal vote to overrule the ordering on the party list. Voting without expressing a preference between individuals is possible, although the parties urge their voters to support the party's prime candidate, to protect them from being beaten by someone ranked lower by the party. The share of voters using the open list option at 2022 Swedish general election was 22.49%.

=== Most open variant ===
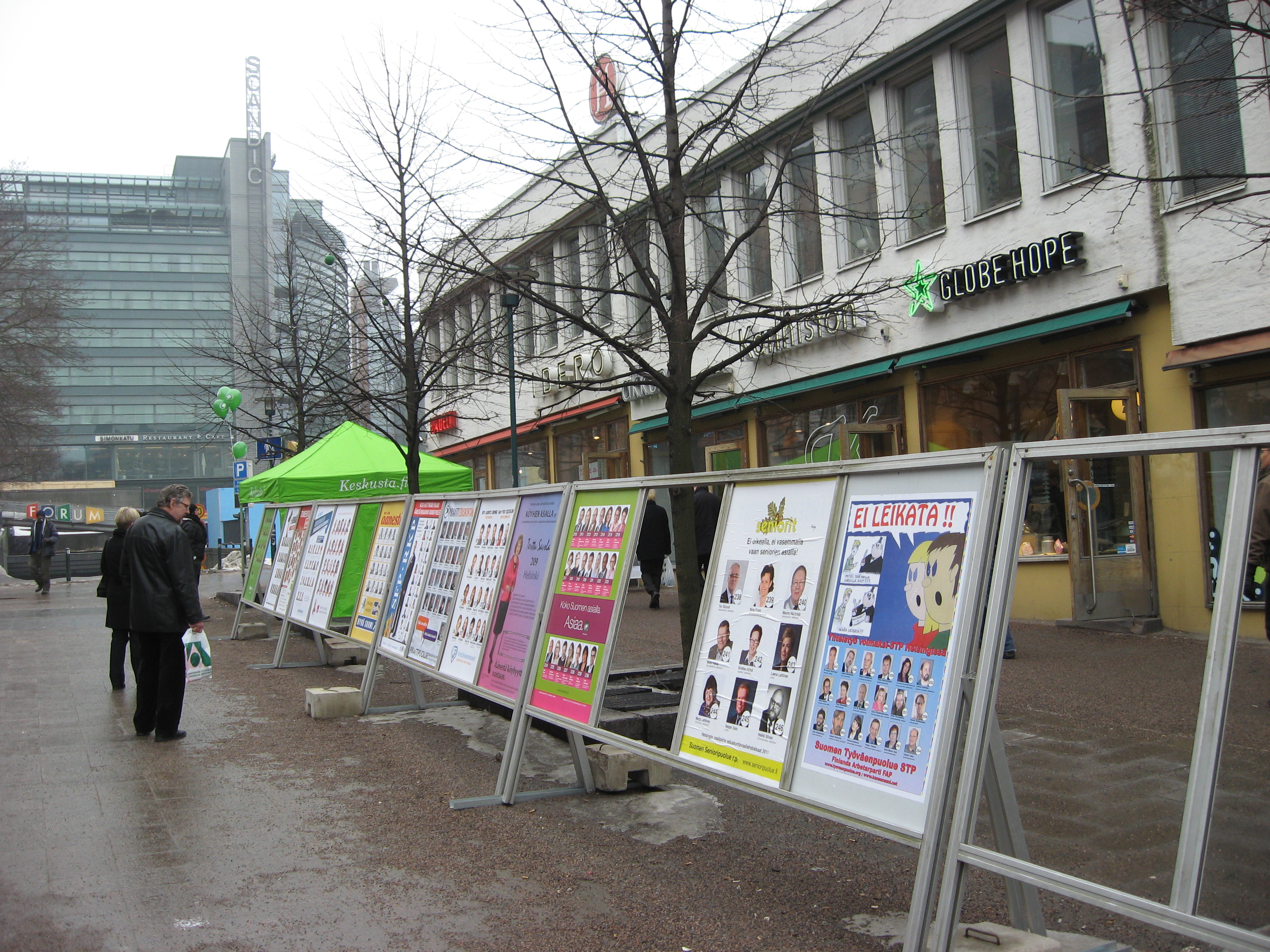
Finnish parliamentary election uses the open list method. Here an official poster rack in central Helsinki displays the candidates and their assigned ballot numbers by party.

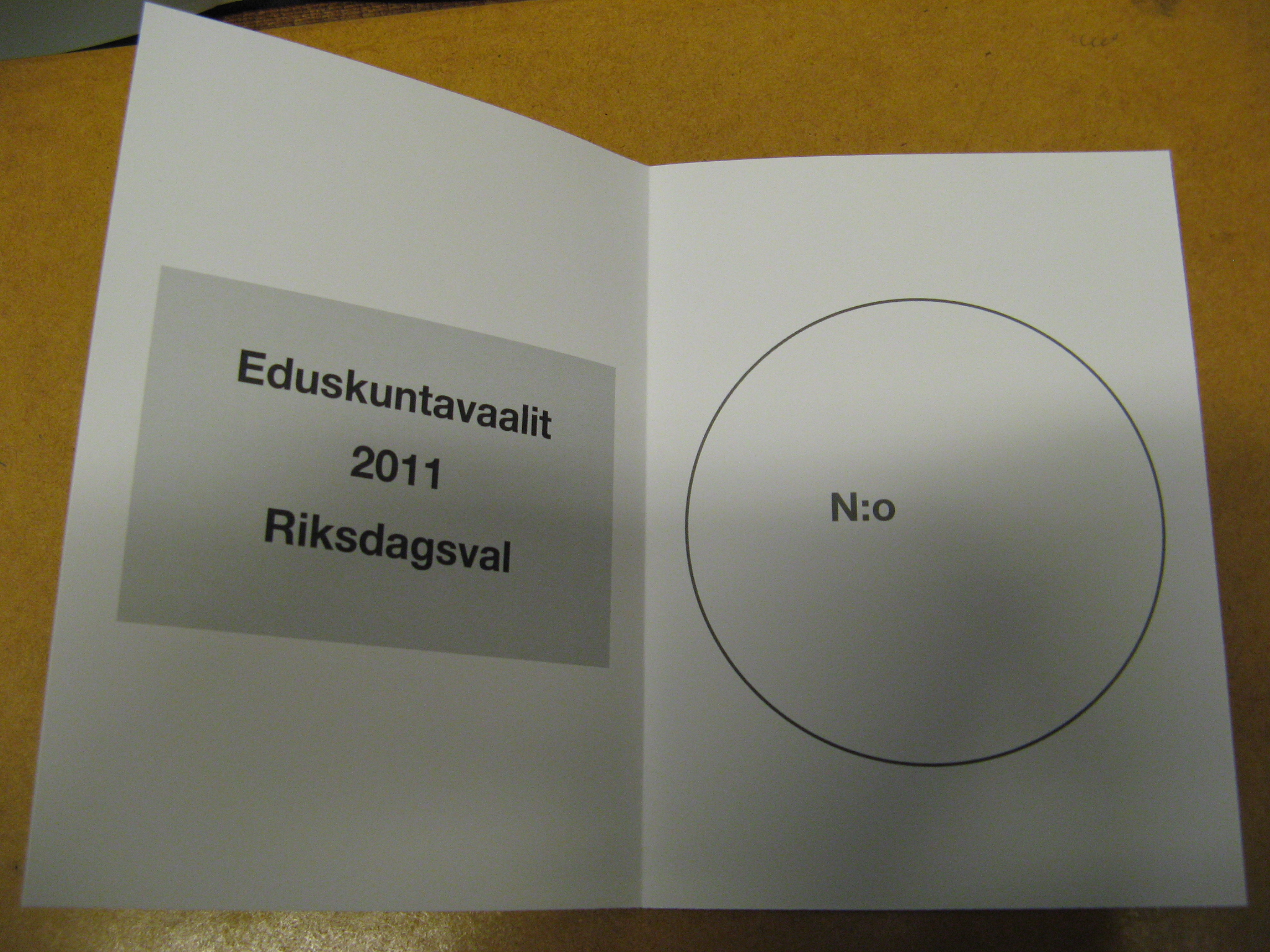
Ballot during the Finnish parliamentary election of 2011

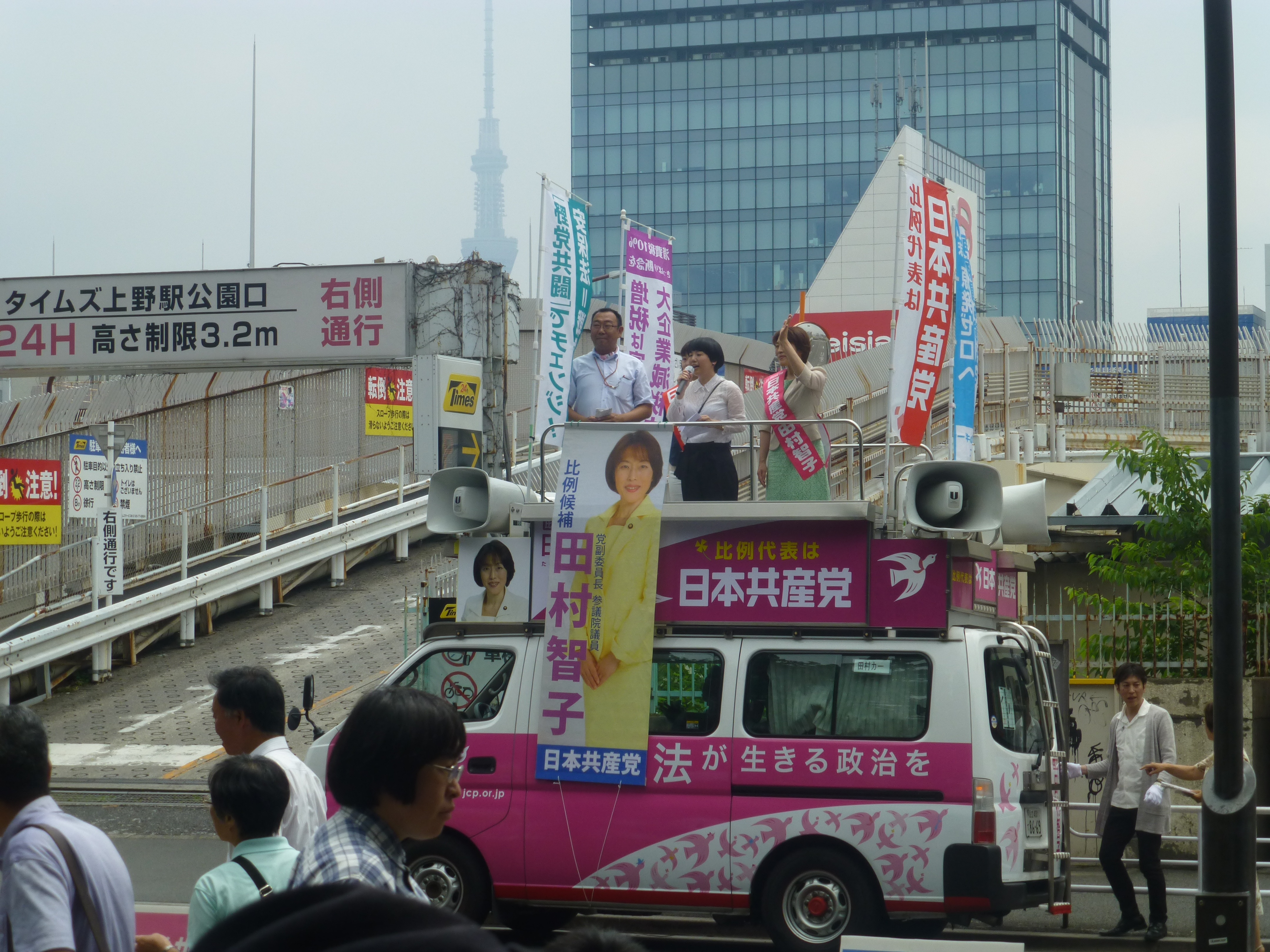
A campaign bus in Tokyo for (successful) Communist proportional candidate Tomoko Tamura in Japan's 2016 Councillors election. Tamura received roughly half of her votes in Tokyo, other proportional candidates on the same list won most of their votes in other prefectures. The proportional district is nationwide; but limited by a very short legal campaign period, some proportional candidates focus their campaign efforts on only certain regions where they personally or their party have a local base.

The most-open list, fully-open list, or simply open list system is one where the number of votes for each candidate fully determines the order of their election on the list. This system is used in all Finnish, Latvian, and Brazilian multiple-seat elections. Since 2001, lists of this "most open" type have also been used in the elections to fill the 96 proportional seats in the 242-member upper house of Japan.

==== Brazil ====
While Brazil still uses the most open type of list for the election of the lower house of the federal legislature, since 2018 there is an additional requirement that candidates must receive 10% of the Hare quota individually to get elected.

==== Latvia ====
In Latvia, voters may vote for a single party but may also give both positive and negative preference votes to each candidate.

=== Free lists or panachage ===
A "free list", more usually called panachage or mixed list, is a variant on the most open list where voters may support candidates on different lists. Candidates are typically elected on the list using either cumulative or block plurality voting. This gives the voters full control over which candidates are elected, not just within a particular party, but even across them. As a result, independents are not forced to support candidates of only one party, and can support candidates across multiple lists, while the pooling by lists still ensures the results are ultimately proportional. It is used in elections at all levels in Liechtenstein, Luxembourg, and Switzerland, in congressional elections in El Salvador, and Honduras, as well as in local elections in a majority of German states, in French communes with under 1,000 inhabitants, and in Czech municipal elections.

== Ballot format ==
Some ways to operate an open list system when using traditional paper-based voting are as follows:

- One method (used in Belgium and the Netherlands) is to have a large ballot paper with a box for each party and sub-boxes for the various candidates. In Belgium, when electronic voting is used (in Flanders and Ostbelgien), the voter has to choose with an electronic pencil on a touchscreen between lists and blank vote, then on the list's page between the top box (vote for the list without preference for specific candidates) or the box(es) for one or several candidates on the same list.
- Another method (used in Slovakia and Spain) is to have a separate ballot paper for each party. To maintain voter secrecy, the voter is handed ballot papers for every party. The voter chooses the candidates (or may vote for the party as a whole) on one of the ballot papers, for example, by drawing circles around the candidate numbers (which is why casting preference votes is called circling in the Czech Republic and Slovakia). Then, the voter puts the party ballot paper into an envelope and puts the envelope into the ballot box.
- In Finland, each candidate is assigned a 3-digit number.

Via voting machines:

- In Brazil, each candidate is assigned a number (in which the first 2 digits are the party number and the others the candidate's number within the party). The voting machine has a telephone-like panel where the voter presses the buttons for the number of their chosen candidates.

=== By country ===
Some of these states may use other systems in addition to an open list, for example first-past-the-post in individual constituencies. Some countries currently with an open list system may only use it in one of the chambers of the legislature.

==== Africa ====
- Democratic Republic of the Congo

==== Americas ====
- Brazil
- Chile
- Colombia
- El Salvador
- Honduras
- Panama
- Peru
- Suriname

==== Asia-Pacific ====
- Fiji
- Indonesia
- Japan for House of Councillors elections
- Jordan
- Lebanon
- Sri Lanka

==== Europe ====
- Albania
- Austria
- Belgium
- Bosnia and Herzegovina
- Bulgaria
- Croatia
- Cyprus
- Czech Republic
- Denmark
- Estonia
- Finland
- Germany in:
  - Bavaria
  - Bremen
  - Hamburg
  - Municipal elections in various states
- Greece
- Iceland
- Italy for European, regional and municipal elections. For national parliamentary elections from the 2027 election.
- Latvia
- Liechtenstein
- Lithuania
- Luxembourg
- Netherlands
- Poland
- San Marino
- Slovakia
- Slovenia
- Sweden
- Switzerland
- Ukraine

==== Partially recognized states ====
- Kosovo
- Northern Cyprus
- Somaliland

=== Types ===
Types of open list systems used in the lower house of the national legislature. Does not include subnational levels, like Aruba.

| Country | Legislative body | System | Variation of open lists | Theshold (flexible lists) | Number of votes (for candidates) | Notes |
|---|---|---|---|---|---|---|
| Albania | Parliament (Kuvendi) | Open list party proportional representation | Partially open | | | |
| Austria | National Council | Open list party proportional representation | More open (flexible lists) | 14% on the district level (among votes for the candidates party) | 1 in each geographic level of candidate list | |
| Austria | National Council | Open list party proportional representation | More open (flexible lists) | 10% on the regional (state) level (among votes for the candidates party) | 1 in each geographic level of candidate list | |
| Austria | National Council | Open list party proportional representation | More open (flexible lists) | 7% of the on the federal level (among votes for the candidates party) | 1 in each geographic level of candidate list | |
| Belgium | Chamber of Representatives | Open list party proportional representation | Semi-open (flexible list) | | As many as there are mandates in the district | |
| Bosnia and Herzegovina | House of Representatives | Open list party proportional representation | | | 0-1 | |
| Brazil | Chamber of Deputies | Open list party proportional representation | Fully open list | None (fully open) | 0-1 | Since 2018 there is an additional requirement that candidates must receive 10% of the Hare quota individually to get elected. |
| Bulgaria | National Assembly | Open list party proportional representation | Semi-open (flexible list) | | 0-1 | |
| Chile | Chamber of Deputies | Open list party proportional representation | Fully open list | None (fully open) | 1 | |
| Colombia | | | | | | |
| Croatia | | Open list party proportional representation | | | 0-1 | |
| Cyprus | | Open list party proportional representation | | | 0-1 for every 4 seats in the district | |
| Czech Republic | | Open list party proportional representation | Relatively open (flexible list) | 5% on the district level (among votes for the candidates party) | 0-4 | |
| Democratic Republic of the Congo | | Parallel voting | | | 0-1 to 0-5 depending on number of seats in the district | |
| Denmark | Folketing (Unicameral legislature) | Open list two tier proportional representation with compensating | Relatively open (flexible list) | | 0-1 | |
| El Salvador | Legislative Assembly | Open list party proportional representation | | | As many as there are mandates in the district Panachage allowed | |
| Estonia | | Open list party proportional representation | Panachage | | 1 | |
| Fiji | | Open list party proportional representation | | | 1 | |
| Finland | | Open list party proportional representation | | | 1 | |
| Greece | | Majority bonus | | | 0-1 to 0-5 depending on number of mandates in the district | Nationwide closed lists and open lists in multi-member districts. The winning party used to receive a majority bonus of 50 seats (out of 300), but this system will be abolished two elections after 2016. In 2020 parliament voted to return to the majority bonus two elections thereafter. |
| Honduras | | Open list party proportional representation | Fully open with panachage (free lists) | None (fully open) | As many as there are mandates in the district Panachage allowed | |
| Iceland | | Open list party proportional representation | | | May change order of candidates on list or cross out rejected candidates | |
| Indonesia | | Open list party proportional representation | | | 0-1 | |
| Kosovo | | Open list party proportional representation | | | 0-5 | |
| Latvia | | Open list party proportional representation | Fully open list | None (fully open) | May vote for as many candidates or reject as many candidates as there are on the list | |
| Lebanon | | Open list party proportional representation | | | 0-1 | |
| Liechtenstein | | Open list party proportional representation | | | As many as there are mandates in the district | |
| Lithuania | | Parallel voting | | | 0-5 | |
| Luxembourg | Chamber of Deputies | Open list party proportional representation | Fully open with panachage (free lists) | None (fully open) | May vote for or delete as many candidates as there are mandates in the district Panachage allowed | |
| Netherlands | House of Representatives | Open list party proportional representation | More open (flexible lists) | 25% of the quota to override the default party-list | 0-1 | |
| Panama | | Parallel voting | | | As many as there are mandates in the district | |
| Peru | | Open list party proportional representation | | | 0-2 | |
| Poland | Sejm | Open list party proportional representation | | | 1 | |
| San Marino | | Majority jackpot / Open list party proportional representation | | | 1 | If needed to ensure a stable majority, the two best-placed parties participate in a run-off vote to receive a majority bonus. |
| Slovakia | | Open list party proportional representation | | | 0-4 | |
| Slovenia | | Open list party proportional representation | | | 0-1 | |
| Sri Lanka | Parliament | Open list Two tier proportional representation without compensating | Panachage (up to 3 preference votes) | | 0-3 | |
| Sri Lanka | Parliament | Open list Two tier proportional representation without compensating | — | | | |
| Suriname | National Assembly | Open list party proportional representation | Most open | | 0-1 | |
| Sweden | Riksdag | Open list Two tiers proportional representation with compensating | More open (5% of the party vote to override the default party-list) | | 0-1 | |
| Switzerland | National Council (Lower house of national legislature) | Open list party proportional representation | Fully open with panachage (free lists) | | May vote for or delete as many candidates as there are mandates in the district Panachage allowed | |

== Notes ==
CEPPS
