= 1971 Nepalese general election =

- 1971

General elections were held in Nepal in 1971 to elect members of the Rastriya Panchayat. At the time, the Rastriya Panchayat had 125 members; out of them 16 were appointed by the King, 90 were elected by Zonal Assemblies, 15 were elected by class organizations and 4 were elected by the graduates constituency.

== District representatives ==
The district representatives were elected by the Anchal Sabhas (Zonal Assemblies) of the 14 Zones of Nepal, one representative for each district. The 15 districts with a population of more than 100 000 were able to elect an additional Rastriya Panchayat member. The Anchal Sabhas consisted of all the members of the Zilla Panchayats (District Councils). Each Zilla Panchayat had 11 members, who were elected from the town or village panchayats in the district. The town and village panchayats were elected from local assemblies in which all adult residents could vote.

A potential candidate had to be a Zilla Panchayat member of the concerned district to be an eligible to contest a district seat. Moreover, the potential candidate had to be proposed and seconded by two other members of the same Zilla Panchayat. To be elected the candidate would need a simple majority of the votes in the Anchal Sabha. The system favoured the less populates areas in the hills, whose districts had a much lower population than the Terai districts in the south.

== Class organisation representatives ==
The following official class organisations were able to select their representatives in the Rastriya Panchayat. The representatives were elected by the central committees of the respective organisation, through a preferential proportional representation vote:

- Peasants Organisation; 4 seats
- Youth Organisation; 4 seats
- Women's Organisation; 3 seats
- Labour Organisation; 2 seats
- Ex-Servicemens' Organisation; 2 seats

== Graduates constituency ==
The college graduates of the country, numbering about 13000 at the time, were able to elect four members of the Rastriya Panchayat. The representatives were elected with Preferential Proportional Representation vote. The candidates had to be college graduates themselves. In total 22 candidates were in the fray. Seventeen of them contested on a joint reformist agenda. One candidate, the young advocate Ram Raja Prasad Singh, demanded direct transition to parliamentary democracy.

The prime minister Kirti Nidhi Bista campaigned against the reformist candidates as opponents of the Panchayat system. However, the regime was embarrassed as the reformist candidates were elected, including Ram Raja Prasad Singh.
