= Ram Raja Prasad Singh =

Nepali politician (1936–2012)

- Born: 1936; Saptari, Nepal
- Died: 12 September 2012 (aged 75–76); Kathmandu, Nepal
- Occupations: Lawyer, politician

Ram Raja Prasad Singh (Nepali: राम राजा प्रसाद सिंह) (1936 – 12 September 2012) was a Nepalese politician. In July 2008, Communist Party of Nepal (Maoist), a Nepalese political party which merged with other communist parties and renamed to Communist Party of Nepal (Maoist-Centre) नेपाल कम्युनिष्ट पार्टी (माओवादी)केन्द्र, or CPN(M-C), proposed Singh as their candidate in the first presidential election in the country.

Singh was born in 1936, in the Saptari district. His father, Jaya Mangal Prasad Singh, was landlord of Indian origin. In 1942, Indian socialist leaders Jayaprakash Narayan and Ram Manohar Lohia visited Nepal to gain support for the Quit India Movement and organise a guerrilla army to fight against British colonial rule. The two stayed at Singh's household, when he was seven years old. Nepali police discovered a cache of rifles in the forest and arrested Lohia and Narayan, along with three other comrades. Singh's father and the remaining guerrilla soldiers attacked the detention centre and freed the guerillas. His father was later arrested and sentenced for the killing of two policemen during the raid. Ram Raja and his brother Laxman were imprisoned alongside their father. They were released after India's independence.

Singh went on to study law at Delhi University. He met Latin American revolutionary leader Che Guevara while studying at the university. Guevara advised Singh to take up guerrilla struggle in Nepal.

Singh, a young Supreme Court lawyer, contested one of the four graduate seats in the 1971 Rastriya Panchayat election. He won the seat on a platform of restoring parliamentary democracy in Nepal, and his victory was seen as a humiliation for the regime. Whilst several other candidates for the graduate seats had declared their wish for gradual democratic reforms (17 candidates contested on a common reformist platform), Singh was the sole candidate to call for immediate transition to democracy.

The presiding officer of the Rastriya Panchayat was reluctant to let Singh be sworn in along with the other members of the assembly. He was arrested by plainclothes policemen inside the lobby of the assembly. A special tribunal sentenced him. On 26 August 1971, he was given a royal pardon and was later sworn in as a member of the Rastriya Panchayat. After his release, Singh continued to be a vocal advocate for democratic change and began organising public meetings in different parts of the country.

In 1976, he established Nepal Janabadi Morcha (Nepal Democratic Front), a left-wing political movement in Nepal.

Singh claimed responsibility for the 1985 bombings in Kathmandu. He was convicted of the bombings and his property was confiscated by the government. However, Singh escaped Nepal and went into exile in India. At least eight people were killed, including a member of parliament. In the capital, the blasts went off near the royal palace, at the deluxe Hotel de l'Annapurna owned by the royal family, Singh Durbar, the prime minister's office, and parliament. Bombs also went off at the Bhairahawa airport, Nepalganj and Mahendranagar in the west as well as Birgunj, Janakpur, Biratnagar and Jhapa in the east.

He returned to Nepal in 1990.

On 2 September 2012, Singh was admitted to the Tribhuvan University Teaching Hospital (TUTH) in the Kathmandu. He died on 12 September 2012 at the hospital at the age of 77. The Nepali government ordered the national flag to be flown at half-mast in all government offices in the country and Nepali embassies and missions abroad on 13 September 2012.

== See also ==
- Ram Raja Prasad Singh Academy of Health Sciences
