= Khemraj Bhatta 'Mayalu' =

Nepali politician (1946/1947–2023)

Personal details
- Born: 1946/1947
- Died: 22 September 2023 (aged 76) Kathmandu, Nepal
- Party: Nepali Congress
- Other political affiliations: Nepali Congress (Democratic)

Khemraj Bhatta 'Mayalu' (Nepali: खेमराज भट्ट 'मायालु'; 1946/1947 – 22 September 2023) was a Nepalese politician. He was a member of the Nepali Congress (NC) party, the successor party to Nepali Congress (Democratic) [NC(D)] of which he had also been a member while it existed. (The two—formerly split—parties reunified in 2007.) During the panchayat regime he was the general secretary of the underground leftist group Nepal Janabadi Morcha (NJM), living in exile in Lucknow, India. After the 1985 Nepal bombings, which NJM had claimed responsibility for, Mayalu received a life sentence in absentia.

In the 1994 Nepalese legislative elections Mayalu was the candidate of NJM in the Dadeldhura constituency. Mayalu came second with 9966 votes; the seat was won by Sher Bahadur Deuba of Nepali Congress with 20701 votes.

Later Mayalu joined the Nepali Congress; he won the Bardia 3 seat in the 1999 legislative elections as a Nepali Congress candidate. He got 15574 votes.

On 23 February 2001, the Maoists (at that time, the "Communist Party of Nepal (Maoist)", and since 2009, the "Communist Party of Nepal [Maoist Centre]") attacked Mayalu's residence in Daulatpur, Bardiya. In total Maoists have seized 15 bighas (10.1 hectares or 25 acres) of land belonging to Mayalu.

When Sher Bahadur Deuba split away from the NC party and formed NC(D), Mayalu followed him. On 18 October 2001, Mayalu was named Minister of General Administration in Deuba's cabinet.

Mayalu died in Kathmandu on 22 September 2023, at the age of 76. The 76-year-old former MP was receiving treatment for cancer at Bir Hospital, Mayalu's brother Chhabi Raj Bhatta confirmed.
