= 1999 Latvian pensions referendum =

13 November 1999
- Are you in favor of repealing the amendments of 5 August 1999 to the People's Pension Law?

Results
Choice	Votes	%
Yes	320,071	94.63%
No	18,160	5.37%
Valid votes	338,231	99.52%
Invalid or blank votes	1,648	0.48%
Total votes	339,879	100.00%
Registered voters/turnout	1,354,099	25.1%

A referendum on state pensions was held in Latvia on 13 November 1999. A bill amending the state pension law had been passed by the Saeima on 5 August. It proposed equalising the retirement age of 60 for men and 57.5 for women at 62 by 2006, as well as beginning to withhold pensions from pensioners earning more than double the state pension the following year and withholding payments to all pensioners earning an income by 2005.

Voters were asked "are you for or against the repeal of the Amendments in the Law on State Pensions of 5/8/1999?" A large majority (95%) voted in favour of repealing the law, although voter turnout was just 25%.

== Results ==
Choice	Votes	%
For	320,071	94.63
Against	18,160	5.37
Total	338,231	100.00
Valid votes	338,231	99.52
Invalid/blank votes	1,648	0.48
Total votes	339,879	100.00
Registered voters/turnout	1,354,099	25.10
Source: Nohlen & Stöver
