= Senate Caucus Mayors and Independents =

Parliamentary group in the Czech Senate

Caucus of Mayors and Ostravak (Czech: Klub Starostové a Ostravak) is a parliamentary group in the Czech Senate.

== Members ==
5 senators:

- TOP 09 and Mayors and Independents: Jaromír Štětina, a senator re-elected in 2010, Jan Horník senator re-elected in 2010, Luděk Jeništa senator elected in 2012
- Ostravak: Leopold Sulovský, a senator elected in 2012
- Mayors and Independents and Citizens for Budějovice : Jiří Šesták, a senator elected in 2012

== Former members ==
- Freedom Union–Democratic Union: 1 senator elected in 2002
- Liberal Reform Party: 1 senator elected in 2002
- Path of Change: 1 senator elected in 2002
- Independent Mayors for Region: 1 senator elected in 2002
- Party for the Open Society: Soňa Paukrtová, a senator re-elected in 2006
- Civic Democratic Alliance: Karel Schwarzenberg, Foreign minister, a senator elected in 2004

== See also ==
- Senate of the Czech Republic
- 2008 Czech Senate election
