= 2008 Mahoran departmental election =

Legislative elections were held in Mayotte on 9 and 16 March 2008 as part of the 2008 French municipal elections. The Union for a Popular Movement emerged as the largest party, winning eight of the nineteen seats.

== Results ==
Party	Seats
Union for a Popular Movement	8
Miscellaneous right	4
Citizen and Republican Movement	1
Democratic Movement	1
Miscellaneous left	1
Independents	4
Total	19
Source: CIA
