= 2008 Czech presidential election =

- 8–9 & 15 February 2008
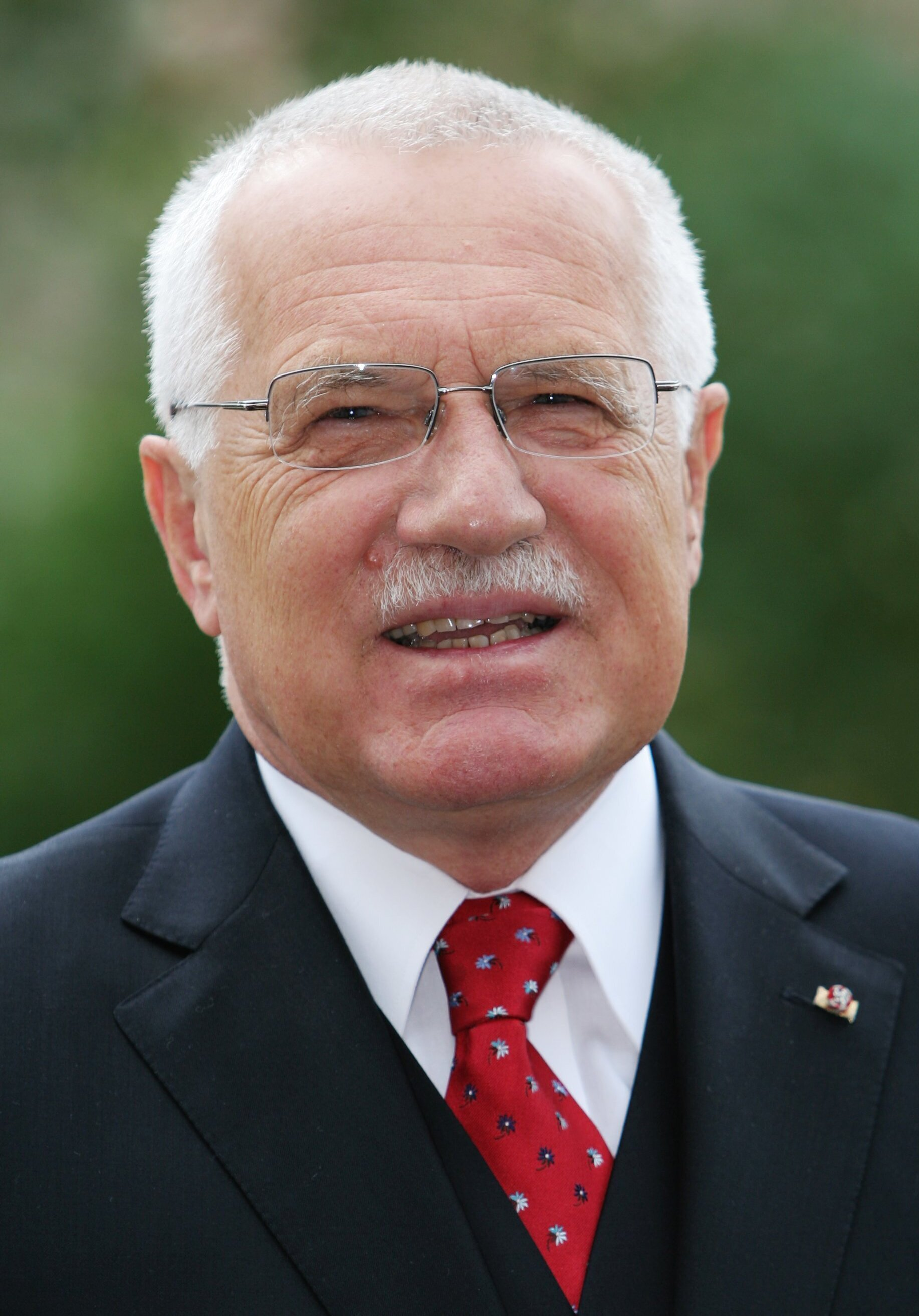

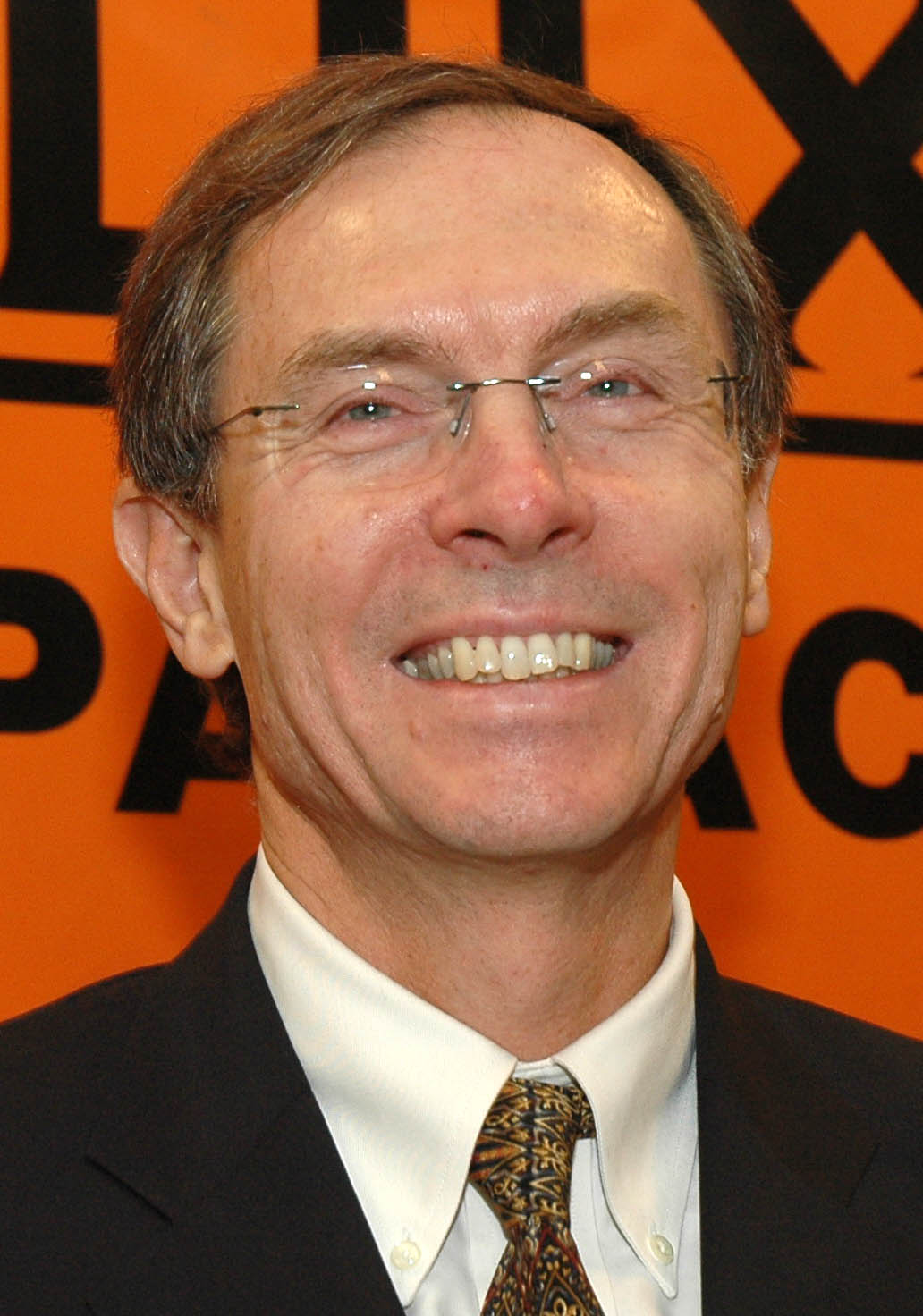
| Nominee | Václav Klaus | Jan Švejnar |
| Party | ODS | ČSSD |
| Electoral vote | 141 | 111 |
| Percentage | 56% | 44% |
President before election
Václav Klaus
ODS
Elected President
Václav Klaus
ODS

Indirect presidential elections were held in the Czech Republic on 8–9 February 2008, in which the President was elected by the Parliament. The candidates standing for election were the incumbent president Václav Klaus and University of Michigan Professor Jan Švejnar.

When no winner emerged on the first ballot, another ballot was held on 15 February 2008, with Klaus narrowly elected for a second term.

== Electoral system ==
The indirect election could be held over a maximum of three rounds, with progressively less strict requirements for election. There were several differences between the 2008 election and previous elections:

1. Compared to the 2003 election, the balance of power between the two chambers of parliament had switched; Klaus's party had an absolute majority in the Senate, supported by pro-Klaus senators from smaller parties.
2. For the first time there were only two candidates, so there was no elimination between the first and second rounds.
3. Due to absences of MPs, the electoral quorum was reduced to 140.

== Background ==
Klaus was nominated for the second term by the 122 MPs and senators belonging to his Civic Democratic Party on 28 November 2007. Jan Švejnar, a US-based economist originally from the Czech Republic, stated that he would announce in early December whether he would run against Klaus, with the support of former president Václav Havel, the Czech Social Democratic Party (ČSSD) and the Green Party, as well as the Senate caucuses of the Association of Independent Lists (SNK) and Open Democracy, which brought together independent and liberal senators from a range of small parties. The Communist Party of Bohemia and Moravia was also considering supporting him. The Christian and Democratic Union – Czechoslovak People's Party (KDU–ČSL) were unable to unite on a candidate, and remained undecided even after holding talks with Klaus. However, along with ČSSD and the Green Party, they supported a constitutional amendment to replace the indirect presidential elections with direct elections, though this only applied from the next election in 2013. Most analysts assumed that Klaus would win re-election.

KSČM was due to decide on 7 December 2007 whether to support Švejnar, and ČSSD said they required substantial cross-party support for his candidacy by 8 December 2007 to declare their full endorsement. However, KSČM interrupted the discussions supporting Švejnar on 7 December 2007, seeking reassurances from ČSSD that they would indeed support Švejnar, fearing that their support for Švejnar would be weakened if ČSSD were not united in his support. Both Klaus and Švejnar vied for the support of KDU–ČSL. Švejnar announced on 8 December 2007 that his candidacy was still active, and that he would decide whether to run in the coming week, depending on the outcome of talks with major parties. On 11 December 2007 the press reported that Švejnar had obtained the support of five analysts and experts to assist him in his presidential bid.

KSČM announced five conditions necessary for them to support a candidate, and said that both of the candidates fulfilled some of the conditions. They said that Švejnar should renounce his US citizenship, which he later pledged to do if elected. ČSSD announced their official support for Švejnar on 15 December 2007.

As the president was to be elected by an absolute majority of MPs and senators, Klaus only needed 19 votes from other parties to win re-election. A public opinion poll in mid-December indicated that Švejnar had gained in popularity and was tied with Klaus.

While it was still uncertain whether Švejnar would run, a serious and emotional debate between Klaus and Švejnar over who contributed more to the economic reforms at the start of the 1990s was interpreted by analysts as a sign that Švejnar did indeed intend to run. By 12 December 2007, he announced that he had gathered the necessary ten signatures from MPs or senators required to run for president; among those nominating him were Senate deputy chairman Petr Pithart (KDU–ČSL), head of the ČSSD senators' group Alena Gajdušková, and Soňa Paukertová, head of the Caucus of Open Democracy in the Senate.

Švejnar proposed a public debate with Klaus, which Klaus refused on the grounds that he did not need the publicity and that it would only help Švejnar. His decision was strongly criticised by ČSSD. According to polls, 43% preferred Klaus as president, while 28% preferred Švejnar and 29% were undecided. Former foreign minister Jiří Dienstbier was also suggested by some Social Democrats and Communists as a possible anti-Klaus candidate.

ČSSD reportedly considered various options to ensure that none of their MPs voted for Klaus against the party line, such as conducting an open ballot, making MPs vote in pairs, or asking MPs to take photos with their mobile phones as proof of their votes.

Former president Václav Havel endorsed Švejnar on 1 January 2008.

There were rumours that KDU–ČSL offered their support to Klaus in exchange for the re-appointment of Jiří Čunek as a government minister. Foreign minister Karel Schwarzenberg stated unequivocally that he would resign if Čunek joined the government again after his resignation in late 2007, and the Greens also stated their opposition.

KSČM indicated that they would support Švejnar in the first round to ensure Klaus was not the only candidate to progress to the second round, but said they had not officially decided who to support in later rounds.

According to polls from early January 2008, Švejnar would have beaten Klaus in a direct election by 52% to 48%. Polls from late January 2008 saw Švejnar increase his lead to 55% against Klaus's 45%. Other polls favored Klaus in a direct election. According to Palacký University, Klaus would have won 51% to Švejnar's 49. According to Median, Klaus would have won 59% of the vote. The credibility of the polls was questioned when it was revealed that some had been conducted at the request of politicians.

According to questions asked by Mladá fronta Dnes, Klaus and Švejnar differed most on two points: Švejnar was in favor of introducing the Euro as quickly as possible and moving to direct presidential elections, while Klaus was against both. The candidates also differed in their views on the economic transformation of the country after the Velvet Revolution, and on environmental issues.

All parties except ODS agreed that the vote should be held publicly by acclamation (which ODS had a majority to decide in the lower house), threatening to block the third round if the joint session could not agree on the election method. A survey found that over two-thirds of Czechs were in favour of public elections.

== Parties in parliament ==
| Party | Chamber of Deputies | Senate | Endorsed candidate |
|---|---|---|---|
| Civic Democratic Party (ODS) | 81 / 200 | 41 / 81 | Václav Klaus |
| Czech Social Democratic Party (ČSSD) | 72 / 200 | 13 / 81 | Jan Švejnar |
| Communist Party of Bohemia and Moravia (KSČM) | 26 / 200 | 3 / 81 | Jana Bobošíková |
| Christian and Democratic Union - Czechoslovak People's Party (KDU-ČSL) | 13 / 200 | 11 / 81 | Václav Klaus |
| Green Party (SZ) | 6 / 200 | 1 / 81 | Jan Švejnar |
| SNK European Democrats (SNK ED) | 0 / 200 | 7 / 81 | Jan Švejnar |
| Freedom Union – Democratic Union (US-DEU) | 0 / 200 | 1 / 81 | Jan Švejnar |
| Independents | 2 / 200 | 4 / 81 | |

== Candidates and party support ==
| Name | Party | Occupation | Note |
|---|---|---|---|
| Jana Bobošíková | KSČM | MEP; Journalist | Nominated by KSČM at the second election. |
| Václav Klaus | ODS | Incumbent President; Former leader of ODS; Former Prime Minister | Incumbent president running for a second term. |
| Jan Švejnar | ČSSD, SZ | Economist | Announced his candidacy on 14 December 2007. |

ODS and KDU-ČSL supported Klaus.

The Czech Social Democratic Party, the Green Party, the Caucus SNK and the Caucus of Open Democracy supported Švejnar.

KSČM was divided over whether to support Švejnar or Klaus; about half of the party's 26 deputies and three senators favored Klaus, and the other half Švejnar.

Three well-known Czech political analysts rated the chances of Klaus and Švejnar at 60–40, 70–30 and 95–5, respectively.

== Results ==
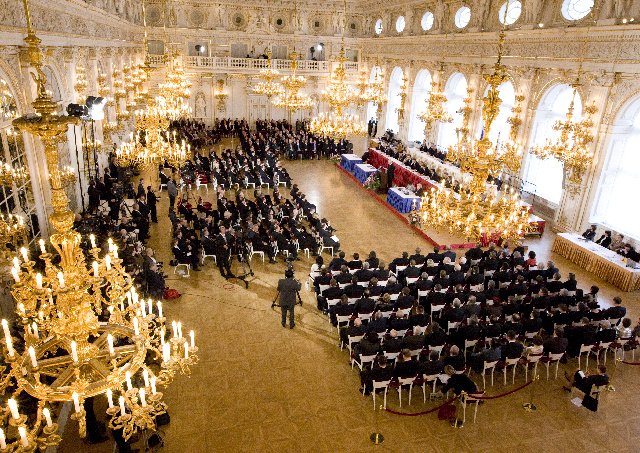
Joint session of the Parliament of the Czech Republic electing the President.

=== First attempt (8–9 February) ===
The joint session started on 8 February 2008 at 10 a.m. As predicted, the vote was delayed by a long debate on the election method, but after six hours it was agreed to hold an open ballot. After two rounds of voting, the session was adjourned at 9 p.m as previously agreed, and the election was postponed to the next day, when the results of the second vote held on the first day were also announced.

Prior to the third round of voting, three lawmakers left the joint session due to health issues: ČSSD deputy Evžen Snítilý and KDU-ČSL senators Josef Kalbáč and Karel Barták. Snítilý was thought to be in favour of Švejnar, but supported Klaus in the second election on 15 February and was later expelled from the Social Democrat group, while both Kalbáč and Barták supported Klaus. The third round also failed to produce a winner; the Communists abstained instead of voting for Švejnar, but Klaus fell one vote short of a majority of 140 of the 278 lawmakers present.

| Round | Václav Klaus | | Jan Švejnar | |
| Round | Deputies | Senators | Deputies | Senators |
|---|---|---|---|---|
| 1st | 92 | 47 | 106 | 32 |
| 1st | 139 | | 138 | |
| 2nd | 94 | 48 | 104 | 31 |
| 2nd | 142 | | 135 | |
| 3rd | 92 | 47 | 81 | 32 |
| 3rd | 139 | | 113 | |

=== Second attempt (15 February) ===
The date for the second election was set for 15 February 2008. The second election also allowed for three rounds, with the same rules as the first election, and both candidates ran again. In the second election, KSČM proposed an additional candidate: MEP and former TV news presenter Jana Bobošíková, known as an outspoken critic of the EU and the planned US missile shield in Poland and the Czech Republic.

The three nominees were Švejnar, Klaus and Bobošíková. Bobošíková was nominated by 17 KSČM deputies, but the Communists indicated that they would be inclined to support Švejnar under certain conditions.

Klaus's chances of reelection were boosted when Snítilý announced that he would vote for Klaus prior to the session. In his address on 15 February 2008 before the joint session of parliament, Klaus unexpectedly declared that he supported holding the presidential election as a public ballot, and not a secret ballot as he had demanded before. Klaus's speech was also significantly more nationalist and eurosceptic than the previous week. This was interpreted as a sign that he knew he had the votes to win and no longer needed to moderate his words.

Bobošíková withdrew her candidacy shortly after the debate and before the first round of voting, citing a lack of support. The Communists then said they would use the same strategy as in the first election, supporting Švejnar in the first and second rounds, but abstaining in the third, thus attempting again to prevent the session from electing a president.

After further debate on the method of voting, ODS agreed to hold the vote again with a public ballot. Green MP Olga Zubová was absent from the session for health reasons.

In the first round of voting, Klaus received 141 votes, just enough for his reelection in the third round. The second round saw similar results, but also a drop in support for Švejnar from the Communists. Prior to the third round, it was reported that the Minister for Human Rights and Minorities Džamila Stehlíková from the Greens was at Zubová's residence, in an attempt to convince her to attend the third round of voting to improve Švejnar's chances.

In the third round Klaus was re-elected as President of the Czech Republic.

| Round | Václav Klaus | | Jan Švejnar | | Jana Bobošíková |
| Round | Deputies | Senators | Deputies | Senators | Jana Bobošíková |
|---|---|---|---|---|---|
| 1st | 93 | 48 | 104 | 32 | retracted candidacy |
| 1st | 141 | | 136 | | retracted candidacy |
| 2nd | 93 | 48 | 94 | 32 | retracted candidacy |
| 2nd | 141 | | 126 | | retracted candidacy |
| 3rd | 93 | 48 | | | retracted candidacy |
| 3rd | 141 | | 111 | | retracted candidacy |
