= 2008 Slovenian regionalisation referendum =

A referendum on establishing thirteen provinces was held in Slovenia on 22 June 2008. While turnout was only 10.9% of registered voters, voters in all but two of the thirteen proposed provinces approved the change, the exception being the Central Slovenia and Coastal–Karst provinces. The referendum was not binding, and a parliamentary decision to establish the provinces was expected later in 2008. While the government explained the necessity of the reform with the fact that Slovenia is the only EU country not to have primary subdivisions, and that it would lead to better administration, the opposition criticised the large number of provinces and called for abstention in the referendum.
