= Nepal Janabadi Morcha =

Nepal Janabadi Morcha (NJM; lit. Nepal Democratic Front) is a leftwing political movement in Nepal. The group was founded in 1976, and worked clandestinely during the panchayat regime. Its chairman Ram Raja Prasad Singh lived in exile in India. After the successful Constituent Assembly election in April 2008, Ram Raja Prasad Singh was proposed by the Communist Party of Nepal (Maoist)—now the Communist Party of Nepal (Maoist Centre)—as a potential candidate to become the first president of the Federal Republic of Nepal.

On June 20, 1985, several bombs detonated throughout the country. Eight people were killed. Several days later, NJM claimed responsibility. The explosions spurred hundreds of arrests. The National Panchayat pronounced death sentences in absentia for the NJM leadership, Ram Raja Prasad Singh, Laxman Prasad Singh (vice chairman) and Khemraj Bhatta 'Mayalu' (general secretary). Dr. Laxmi Narayan Jha, Iswar Lama, Padam Lama, Maheswar Chaulagain and Saket Mishra were amongst those arrested after the attacks whom disappeared while in custody.

These events had a great impact on the political situation in the country. At the time it was widely believed that the bombings were the work of provocateurs, as the government wanted to disrupt the mass civil disobedience movements taking place.

In 1987 the NJM split, with one section forming Janabadi Morcha (Nepal)

After the popular uprising of 1990 and the introduction of multiparty democracy, NJM was registered as a legal political party. It is still led by Ram Raja Prasad Singh, but plays little importance in national politics. It publishes Mukti-Morcha. NJM favoured abolition of the monarchy.

In the 1994 legislative elections, Khema Raj Mayalu came second in the constituency Dadeldhuda with 9,966 votes.
