= 2008 Swiss referendums =

List of referendums in Switzerland in 2008

Ten referendums were held in Switzerland during 2008. The first two were held on 24 February on business tax reform and aircraft noise. A further three were held on 1 June on public information campaigns, naturalisation and health reform. The final five were held on 30 November on legalising cannabis, making the pension age flexible, restricting the right of appeal of associations against construction projects, amending the constitutional article on narcotics and eliminating the statute of limitations with respect to pornographic crimes against children.

== February referendums ==
The two February questions were held on:

- A facultative referendum on the business tax reform II – A coalition of parties and organisations (including the Social Democratic Party of Switzerland, the Swiss Federation of Trade Unions, the Green Party of Switzerland, the Evangelical People's Party of Switzerland, the Christian Social Party, the Swiss Labour Party, ATTAC Switzerland, Travail.Suisse) collected about 65,000 signatures by early July 2007, thus meeting the required number of signatures for a facultative referendum.

Choice	Votes	%
For	938,744	50.53
Against	918,990	49.47
Invalid/blank votes	57,221	–
Total	1,914,955	100
Registered voters/turnout	4,957,889	38.62
Source: Direct Democracy

- A people's initiative against fighter aircraft noise in tourism areas – seeking to forbid training flights of fighter aircraft over tourism areas in times of peace.

Choice	Public vote		Cantons		
Choice	Votes	%	Full	Half	Total
For	601,071	31.92	0	0	0
Against	1,282,108	68,08	20	6	23
Invalid/blank votes	37,706	–	–	–	–
Total	1,944,259	100	20	6	23
Registered voters/turnout	4,957,889	38.74	–	–	–
Source: Direct Democracy

== June referendums ==
The three referendums in June were held on:

- people's initiative against publicly funded information campaigns by the government, also known as the "muzzle initiative";
- people's initiative for democratic naturalisation, which was trying to retain the right of deciding on the naturalisation of foreign citizens through a vote at municipal level;
- counterproposal to the withdrawn people's initiative on the Krankenversicherungsgesetz.

All three questions were rejected in the referendum. The most controversial initiative was the proposal to allow local communities to hold popular votes on the naturalisation of foreigners with no right of appeal.

=== Naturalisation ===
Switzerland has one of the largest number of foreign residents in Europe with foreigners making up over 20% of residents. In order to gain citizenship people must have lived in Switzerland for 12 years and have passed tests on the language and culture of Switzerland. In July 2003 the Swiss Supreme court blocked the holding of popular votes by local communities to decide on the naturalisation of immigrants who live in that community. The Supreme Court acted after a vote in Emmen in which eight Italians were approved but 48 Eastern European and Turkish candidates were rejected. The court ruled that they had been discriminated against on religious and ethnic grounds and said that all applicants had the right to know the reason for rejection.

The Swiss People's Party (SVP) brought an initiative forward to permit such popular votes to take place.

During the campaign on naturalisation votes the SVP sent literature out detailing crimes committed by people who had been granted citizenship. They also produced billboards showing black, brown and white hands reaching for Swiss passports and saying "Stop the Mass Naturalizations". They argued the measure was needed due an eightfold increase in naturalisations between 1991 and 2006.

The government and the four other main political parties opposed the naturalisation referendum and preferred the existing system where elected bodies took the decision and where there is a right to appeal. In May 2008 a group of 72 professors of constitutional law produced newspaper adverts urging people to reject the measure. Opponents argued that the measure was unconstitutional and violated international law.

A poll on the referendum in April showed support for the measure but another in May showed only 33% supporting the measure, 56% against and 11% undecided.

In order for the initiative to pass a majority of Swiss cantons would have had to support it as well as a majority of voters. In the end only one of the 26 cantons, Schwyz, supported the initiative. Some cantons, such as Geneva and Vaud, had up to 82% of voters against the measure.

Internal disputes within the People's Party and the lack of a clear message in favour of the proposal were seen as reasons for the defeat of the measure. The government welcomed the results of the referendum saying that they showed people had confidence in the authorities.

Choice	Public vote		Cantons		
Choice	Votes	%	Full	Half	Total
For	804,730	36.25	1	0	1
Against	1,415,249	63.75	19	6	22
Invalid/blank votes	25,598	–	–	–	–
Total	2,245,577	100	20	6	23
Registered voters/turnout	4,970,220	45.18	–	–	–
Source: Direct Democracy

=== Government information ===
This question asked voters to restrict the information that the government could provide before referendums. The measure would have prevented members of the government from giving their opinions on topics that were to be voted on in a referendum. Supporters, including the People's Party, argued the government should not be providing what they described as propaganda at the expense of the taxpayers. The measure had been proposed due to what they described as excessive government propaganda on foreign policy questions. However opponents, including most other political parties, argued it was the job of the government to provide their opinion on referendums.

Choice	Public vote		Cantons		
Choice	Votes	%	Full	Half	Total
For	538,928	24.80	0	0	0
Against	1,634,196	75.20	20	6	23
Invalid/blank votes	56,089	–	–	–	–
Total	2,245,577	100	20	6	23
Registered voters/turnout	2,229,213	44.85	–	–	–
Source: Direct Democracy

=== Health reform ===
This measure was intended to reform the health sector by reducing expenditures and increasing the role of insurers. The measure would have amended the constitution to give an outline of the health care system including the principles of competition and free choice. It was designed to increase competition within the health insurance sector. However opponents feared it would bolster the position of insurance companies, give higher costs for patients and restrict access to doctors. It was supported by the government but opposed by the Social Democratic and Christian Democrat parties.

Choice	Public vote		Cantons		
Choice	Votes	%	Full	Half	Total
For	661,312	30.52	0	0	0
Against	1,505,702	69.48	20	6	23
Invalid/blank votes	60,196	–	–	–	–
Total	2,227,210	100	20	6	23
Registered voters/turnout	4,970,220	44.81	–	–	–
Source: Direct Democracy

== November referendums ==
In the November referendums Swiss voters rejected initiatives aiming at a legalisation of cannabis, at a flexibilisation of the pension age and at restricting the right of appeal of associations against construction projects. They accepted the revision of the federal statute on narcotics and, as a surprise result, the elimination of the statute of limitations with respect to pornographic crimes against children.

=== Elimination of the statute of limitations with respect to pornographic crimes against children ===
The initiative "for the elimination of the statute of limitations with respect to pornographic crimes against children" (German: Für die Unverjährbarkeit pornografischer Straftaten an Kindern, French: Pour l'imprescriptibilité des actes de pornographie enfantine) provided for an amendment to the Swiss Federal Constitution, introducing a new article 123b stating that "the prosecution of sexual or pornographic infractions against prepubescent children, as well as the penalty for such infractions, are not subject to the statute of limitations".

The initiative was submitted on 1 March 2006 by "Marche Blanche", an association of victims of child sexual abuse and their relatives, with 119,375 valid signatures. The proponents of the initiative argued that victims of pedophilia often take a long time to become old enough and muster the courage to bring the perpetrators, who are often members of their immediate family, to justice. Therefore, according to the proponents, the statute of limitations often has the effect of preventing the effective prosecution of child sexual abuse.

The Swiss Federal Council and the Swiss Federal Assembly recommended that the initiative be rejected. The National Council opposed the initiative with 163 against 19 votes, the Council of States unanimously. All political parties in Switzerland with the exception of the Swiss People's Party and the Federal Democratic Union also opposed the initiative. The federal authorities argued that the initiative was vaguely phrased, making reference to the puberty of children, a developmental phase often difficult to exactly pinpoint in time and varying among children. They noted that the statute of limitations was necessary to prevent useless prosecutions, because after dozens of years the testimony of witnesses was often not reliable enough to secure a conviction. In the opinion of the federal authorities, imprescriptibility should remain reserved for crimes of exceptional gravity such as genocide and terrorist acts. Finally, the federal authorities argued that a previous change in law had already accomplished much of what the proponents desired, fixing the period of prescription at 15 years starting with the 18th birthday of the victim.

Choice	Public vote		Cantons		
Choice	Votes	%	Full	Half	Total
For	1,206,323	51.87	16	4	18
Against	1,119,119	48.13	4	2	5
Invalid/blank votes	48,870	–	–	–	–
Total	2,374,312	100	20	6	23
Registered voters/turnout	4,996,626	47.52	–	–	–
Source: Direct Democracy

=== Legalisation of the personal consumption and production of cannabis ===
The initiative "for a sensible cannabis policy with effective protection of the youth" (German: Für eine vernünftige Hanfpolitik mit wirksamem Jugendschutz, French: Pour une politique raisonnable en matière de chanvre protégeant efficacement la jeunesse) provided for an amendment to the Federal Constitution. It would have introduced a new article 105b declaring the consumption, purchase and production of cannabis for personal use to be legal, while charging the federal authorities with ensuring an adequate protection of the Swiss youth.

The initiative was submitted on 13 January 2006 by a committee of left-wing and liberal politicians with 105,994 valid signatures. The proponents of the initiative argued that the prohibition of cannabis was ineffective, as attested by some 600,000 consumers of the drug in Switzerland, and should be lifted.

The Swiss Federal Council and the Swiss Federal Assembly recommended that the initiative be rejected. The National Council opposed the initiative with 111 against 73 votes, the Council of States with 19 against 18. Among the political parties in Switzerland, only the liberal and left-wing parties and the youth wing of the Free Democratic Party of Switzerland supported the initiative.

Choice	Public vote		Cantons		
Choice	Votes	%	Full	Half	Total
For	846,985	36.75	0	0	0
Against	1,457,900	63.25	20	6	23
Invalid/blank votes	60,546	–	–	–	–
Total	2,365,431	100	20	6	23
Registered voters/turnout	4,996,626	47.34	–	–	–
Source: Direct Democracy

=== Revision of the federal statute on narcotics ===
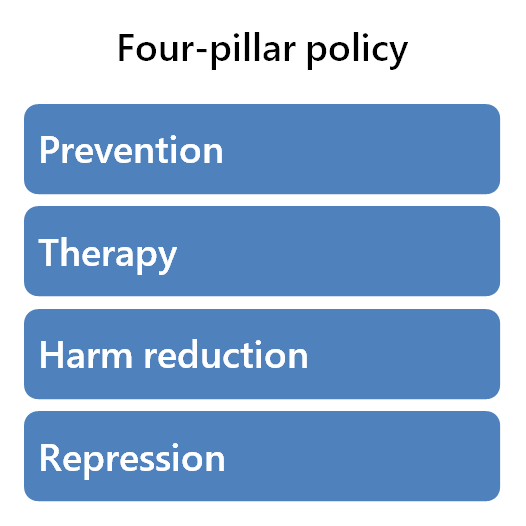
The 4 pillars of Switzerland's drug policy: prevention, treatment, harm reduction and repression.

The revision of the federal statute on narcotics (German: Bundesgesetz über die Betäubungsmittel und die psychotropen Stoffe, French: Loi fédérale sur les stupéfiants et les substances psychotropes) was adopted on 20 March 2008 by the Swiss Federal Assembly, with the National Council passing the law by 114 to 68 votes and the Council of States unanimously. It provided for a statutory basis for the Swiss strategy against illegal drugs practiced since 1999, which consists of four pillars: prevention, harm reduction, therapy and repression. Most controversially, the revision allowed for a continuation of the governmental distribution of heroin to heavily addicted persons.

Objecting to that programme and demanding a strict policy of prohibition, a committee of conservative politicians of the Federal Democratic Union and Swiss People's Party collected 51,969 valid signatures against the change in law, thereby subjecting it to a popular referendum.

Choice	Votes	%
For	1,541,928	68.08
Against	722,992	31.92
Invalid/blank votes	82,003	–
Total	2,355,412	100
Registered voters/turnout	4,996,626	47.14
Source: Direct Democracy

=== Restriction of the right of associations to appeal against building projects ===
The initiative for the restriction of the right of associations to appeal against building projects (German: "de:Verbandsbeschwerderecht: Schluss mit der Verhinderungspolitik - Mehr Wachstum für die Schweiz!", French: "Droit de recours des organisations: Assez d'obstructionnisme - Plus de croissance pour la Suisse!") provided for an amendment to the Federal Constitution. It would have introduced a new article 30a, which would have removed the standing of environmental organizations to take legal action against construction projects approved by popular vote or by a federal, cantonal or municipal legislature.

Choice	Public vote		Cantons		
Choice	Votes	%	Full	Half	Total
For	773,467	34.00	0	0	0
Against	1,501,766	66.00	20	6	23
Invalid/blank votes	83,980	–	–	–	–
Total	2,359,213	100	20	6	23
Registered voters/turnout	4,996,626	47.22	–	–	–
Source: Direct Democracy

=== Flexible state pension age ===
The initiative "for a flexible state pension age" (German: ""für ein flexibles AHV-Alter"", French: «Pour un âge de l'AVS flexible») provided for an amendment to the Federal Constitution. It would have introduced a new article art. 112 par. 2 littera e, which would have allowed most people to retire without the loss of state benefits at the age of 62 instead of at the age of 65 for men or 64 for women.

Choice	Public vote		Cantons		
Choice	Votes	%	Full	Half	Total
For	970,221	41.38	4	0	4
Against	1,374,598	58.62	16	6	19
Invalid/blank votes	35,377	–	–	–	–
Total	2,380,196	100	20	6	23
Registered voters/turnout	4,996,626	47.64	–	–	–
Source: Direct Democracy
