= 2003 Latvian European Union membership referendum =

| 20 September 2003 |
- Do you support the membership of Latvia in the European Union?

Results
| Choice | Votes | % |
|---|---|---|
| Yes | 676,700 | 67.49% |
| No | 325,980 | 32.51% |
| Valid votes | 1,002,680 | 99.23% |
| Invalid or blank votes | 7,787 | 0.77% |
| Total votes | 1,010,467 | 100.00% |
| Registered voters/turnout | 1,414,133 | 71.45% |

A referendum on European Union membership was held in Latvia on 20 September 2003. Latvia was the last of the states which would join the EU in 2004 to hold a referendum on the issue. Just over two-thirds of voters voted Yes and Latvia joined the EU on 1 May 2004.

== Background ==
Latvia was invited to begin negotiations to join the EU in 1999 and was formally invited to join at a summit in Copenhagen in December 2002. On 27 December 2002 the Latvian government decided to hold a referendum on 20 September 2003 on joining the EU. In May 2003 the Parliament of Latvia amended the Constitution of Latvia to allow referendums on international matters. Campaigning began on 5 May 2003.

== Referendum question ==
The question voted on in the referendum was:

Do you support the membership of Latvia in the European Union?

== Campaign ==
Latvia was seen as being one of the more skeptical countries on joining the European Union, but polls in the years before the referendum consistently showed an advantage for supporters of EU accession. Only one opinion poll in February 2002 showed opponents of membership in the lead. Support for membership rose during the campaign with over 50% expected to support membership as the referendum neared.

Supporters of joining the EU included the coalition government and the business community. They argued that this would give access to EU markets and development aid. They also stressed that membership would provide protection from pressure from Russia. In the last few weeks the Yes campaign launched an advertising campaign with the slogan "Don’t stay aside!”

The No campaign argued that Latvia should not surrender the sovereignty they had recently gained from the Soviet Union. They also suggested that Latvia would suffer economically as the poorest of the candidate countries. Generally opposition was higher among southeastern regions of Latvia with a large ethnic Russian population.

== Results ==
Result by district and city For Against

The results saw the highest turnout of any of the Eastern European countries holding referendums in 2003 and well above the 35% required in order to make the referendum binding. The Yes vote was ahead in 30 of the 34 electoral districts with the highest Yes vote among Latvians abroad with over 90% supporting membership. The highest No vote was in the poorer east of Latvia, especially where there were significant numbers of ethnic Russians.

| Choice | Votes | % |
|---|---|---|
| For | 676,700 | 67.49 |
| Against | 325,980 | 32.51 |
| Total | 1,002,680 | 100.00 |
| Valid votes | 1,002,680 | 99.23 |
| Invalid/blank votes | 7,787 | 0.77 |
| Total votes | 1,010,467 | 100.00 |
| Registered voters/turnout | 1,414,133 | 71.45 |
Source: Nohlen & Stöver

== Reactions ==
The Prime Minister of Latvia, Einars Repše, celebrated the result with 2,000 young people in Riga. He put a blue EU t-shirt on and said that "Latvians understand this is a decisive moment!" The President of Latvia, Vaira Vīķe-Freiberga, described the result as "wiping out forever the divisions on the map of Europe that the odious Molotov–Ribbentrop Pact of 1939 placed here."
