= 2008 Trinidad and Tobago presidential election =

- 11 February 2008

72 members of the Parliament of Trinidad and Tobago 37 Electoral votes needed to win
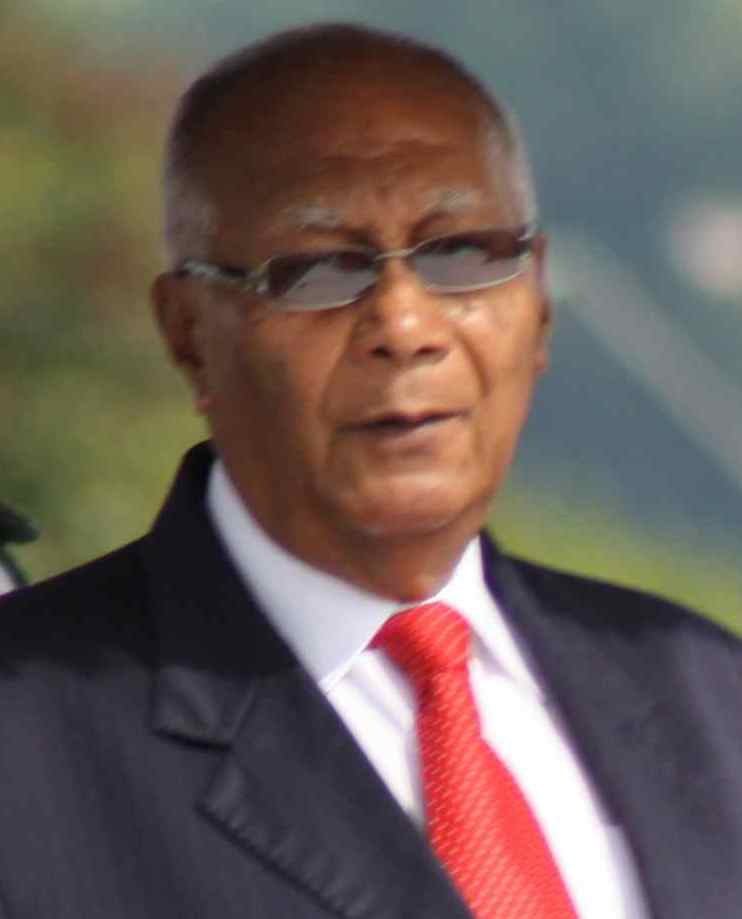
Nominee	George Maxwell Richards
Party	Independent
Electoral vote	Unopposed
President before election
George Maxwell Richards
Independent
Elected President
George Maxwell Richards
Independent

Indirect presidential elections were held in Trinidad and Tobago on 11 February 2008.

The incumbent George Maxwell Richards was expected to be reelected after being approved as the only nominee by 15 MPs on 4 February 2008.

The election was held through an electoral college consisting of a joint sitting of the two houses of parliament consisting of 72 representatives, and Richards was reelected as expected.

The Opposition party nominated no candidate, in part as a protest to a foregone conclusion of the result and a boycott of the process.
