= 2008 Nepalese presidential election =

Presidential election in Nepal

- 19 July 2008 (first round); 21 July 2008 (second round)
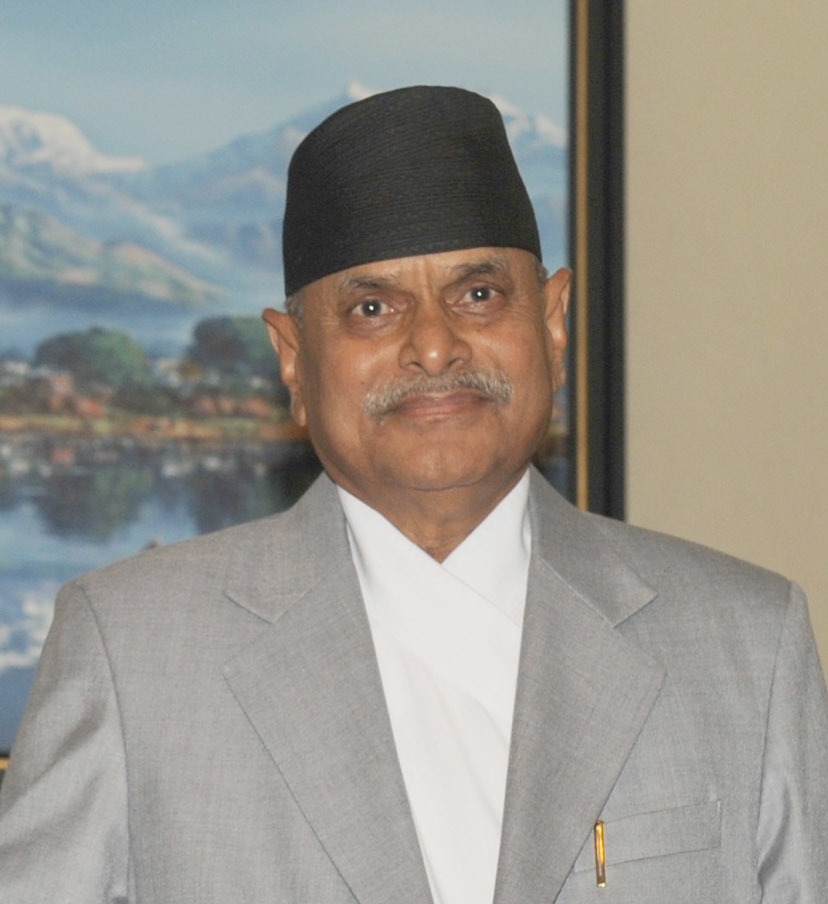
Candidate	Ram Baran Yadav	Ram Raja Prasad Singh
Party	Congress	CPN (Maoist)
Home state	Dhanusa	Saptari
Running mate	Parmananda Jha	Shanta Shrestha
Electoral vote	308	282
Percentage	52.20%	47.80%
Elected President
Ram Baran Yadav
Congress

Indirect presidential elections were held in Nepal in July 2008. The first round of voting was held on 19 July, with a run-off on 21 July. The 1st Nepalese Constituent Assembly (CA) elected in April 2008 elected a new president and vice-president after the Fifth Amendment to the Interim Constitution was passed on 14 July. This would be the first President to be elected after Nepal became a republic a few months earlier.

== Background ==
Following the newly passed amendment, provisions were introduced stating that the majority party would form the government, the Constituent Assembly (CA) would elect the new president on the basis of a majority, and the Leader of the Opposition would become a member of the Constitutional Council. Subsequently, the leading political parties, the Nepali Congress, the Communist Party of Nepal (Maoist), and the Communist Party of Nepal (United Marxist–Leninist) engaged in discussions regarding the selection of the new president. The Nepali Congress supported Prime Minister and interim Head of State Girija Prasad Koirala, while the Communist Party of Nepal (United Marxist–Leninist) backed its former Secretary-General Madhav Kumar Nepal for the presidency. However, the Communist Party of Nepal (Maoist) advocated for an independent figure rather than party leaders such as Koirala or Nepal. Although the Maoists emerged as the largest party in the CA, they still needed to form a coalition government with other parties.

== Organisation ==
The election was conducted by the Office of the Election Officer (OEO). On 16 July 2008 OEO released a voters list of 593 CA members. The CA was 601 seats in total, but due to by-elections due in five constituencies and three CA members had not been sworn in at the time.

== Candidates ==
On 9 June 2008, the CPN (Maoist) declared that five names from outside their party they would consider for the presidency:

- Sahana Pradhan
- Ram Raja Prasad Singh
- Nara Bahadur Karmacharya
- Padma Ratna Tuladhar
- Devendra Raj Pandey.

Negotiations between CPN(Maoist) and CPN(UML) appeared to have broken down by 17 July 2008 so the three major parties all nominated their own candidates for president and vice-president. All three main presidential candidates were Madhesis. The largest Madhesi party, the MJF, announced that they'd support Singh as president, but nominated their own candidate for vice president.

Party	Presidential candidate	Vice-presidential candidate
Communist Party of Nepal (Maoist)	Ram Raja Prasad Singh	Shanta Shrestha
Nepali Congress	Ram Baran Yadav	Min Bahadur Bishwokarma
Communist Party of Nepal (Unified Marxist-Leninist)	Ramprit Paswan	Astalaxmi Shakya
Madhesi Janadhikar Forum		Parmanand Jha

On the day of the poll the CPN(UML) and MJF agreed to back the NC candidate for the presidency and the CPN(UML) and NC agreed to back the MJF candidate for the vice-presidency, thus nullifying the agreement the Maoists had with the three Madhesi parties.

== Results ==
578 CA members participated in the poll on 19 July 2008. Rastriya Prajatantra Party, Rastriya Janamorcha, the Nepal Workers and Peasants Party and the Communist Party of Nepal (Unified) boycotted the election. The sole CA member of the Chure Bhawar Rastriya Ekta Party, Keshav Prasad Mainali, only participated in the vice-presidential poll.

On 19 July, Parmananda Jha was declared the first Vice President of Nepal. Jha received 305 votes beating his nearest rival Shanta Shrestha from the Communist Party of Nepal (Maoist) (CPN-M) with 243 votes. However, the President of Nepal could not be elected as neither candidate got a clear majority. Ram Baran Yadav received 283 votes and Ram Raja Prasad Singh won 270 votes. A run-off election was thus called for.

On 21 July, Ram Baran Yadav of the Nepali Congress, who was supported by the CPN (UML) and MJF, got support from around 308 Constituent Assembly members in 594 Constituent Assembly members. His rival was Ram Raja Prasad Singh, nominated by the CPN (M). Prasad won 282 votes. Earlier, during vice-presidential election and first round of presidential elections, Maoists had threatened to refuse to form a government if their choice for the presidency did not succeed as they feared that certain electoral pledges such as land reform would not able to pass. Kul Bahadur Gurung, the speaker of constituent assembly, declared Ram Yadav winner of second-round presidential election on Monday. Yadav went to become the first President of Nepal after it became a republic. The new president replaced the deposed King Gyanendra as the head of the state.

=== President ===
Candidate	Party	First round		Second round	
Candidate	Party	Votes	%	Votes	%
Ram Baran Yadav	Nepali Congress	283	51.18	308	52.20
Ram Raja Prasad Singh	Communist Party of Nepal (Maoist)	270	48.82	282	47.80
Total		553	100.00	590	100.00
Valid votes		553	95.67		
Invalid votes		24	4.15		
Blank votes		1	0.17		
Total votes		578	100.00		
Registered voters/turnout		594	97.31		
Source: Nepal News

=== Vice-President ===
Candidate	Party	Votes	%
Parmanand Jha	Madheshi Jana Adhikar Forum, Nepal	305	55.66
Shanta Shrestha	Communist Party of Nepal (Maoist)	243	44.34
Total		548	100.00
Source: Nepal News
