= 2008 Lebanese presidential election =

- 25 May 2008
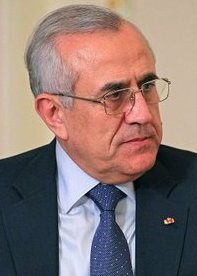
Nominee	Michel Suleiman
Party	Independent
Electoral vote	118
Percentage	92.19%
President before election
Fouad Siniora (acting)
Future Movement
Elected President
Michel Suleiman
Independent

An indirect presidential election was held in the Parliament of Lebanon on 25 May 2008, after the term of incumbent President Émile Lahoud expired on 24 November 2007 at midnight. General Michel Sleiman, the Commander of the Lebanese Armed Forces, was elected as the consensus candidate after months of delays in holding the election due to an ongoing political dispute.

By convention, the presidency is always attributed to a Maronite Christian personality. Under the article 49 of the Lebanese Constitution, a qualified majority of two-thirds of the members of the 128-seat Lebanese Parliament is required to elect the president. After the second round of election, the president is elected by an absolute majority of 65 MPs out of 128.

== Postponement and delays ==
The requested quorum was not formed in the first round (scheduled on 25 September 2007) since opposition MPs boycotted the parliamentary session. Parliament Speaker Nabih Berri initially postponed the session to October 23, 2007, as previously suggested. The session was then further postponed to 12 November 2007, then to 21 November 2007 and finally to 23 November 2007, when the incumbent's term ends. However, on 23 November the session was further postponed until 30 November 2007, and then to 7 December 2007. On December 7 the reforms to the Constitution needed to elect consensus candidate General Michel Sleiman had not been finished yet and the vote was postponed again to 11 December 2007. On that date, it was postponed to 17 December 2007, and then again to 22 December 2007 and to 29 December 2007. On 28 December, it was again delayed to 12 January 2008; on 11 January it was again delayed to 21 January 2008, and then, on 20 January, it was delayed to 11 February 2008. On 9 February, it was again delayed to 26 February 2008, and on 25 February 2008 again delayed until 11 March 2008, then on 9 March 2008 delayed until 25 March 2008. It was then delayed on 24 March 2008 to 22 April 2008. On 22 April 2008, the session was postponed and on 26 April the new date was set to 13 May 2008. Parliament postponed a vote on a new Lebanese president for the 19th time, delaying the session to June 10, 2008. After the Doha Agreement was decided upon on 21 May 2008, a session to elect the president was called on 22 May 2008 to occur on 25 May 2008. On this date, Michel Sleiman was finally elected.

Four candidates from the March 14 Alliance were among the possible standing candidates: MP Boutros Harb, Minister of Justice Charles Rizk, MP Robert Ghanem and former MP Nassib Lahoud. MP Michel Aoun from the Free Patriotic Movement is the single opposition candidate.

== Voting and results ==
The vote was expected to be tense, especially after the assassination of Phalangist MP Antoine Ghanem on 19 September 2007. March 14 leaders, who blame the Syrian government for the assassination of Ghanem, vowed to hold the presidential election as scheduled and to possibly elect a March 14 candidate as president even by simple majority after the second round.

The opposition, which includes Hezbollah, Amal and the Free Patriotic Movement, demanded the formation of a national unity cabinet and warned that an election by simple majority would result in the formation of a shadow cabinet.

An opinion poll by IPSOS and published on 17 September 2005 suggested that the majority of Lebanese may look favourably at a consensual candidate. The LAF Chief Commander Michel Sleiman, the Governor of the Central Bank Riad Salame and the former FA Minister Jean Obeid were credited as possible "consensual" candidates. Sleiman turned out to be the eventual consensus candidate, but his election required constitutional amendments allowing senior state officials to become president.

The term of the ex-president Émile Lahoud was extended for three years in 2004, allegedly under pressure from the Syrian government. Syria withdrew its troops from Lebanon in April 2005, after the assassination of former prime minister Rafik Hariri and the subsequent mass demonstrations known as Cedar Revolution. The general election in Spring 2005 resulted in a majority of 72 seats out of 128 for the anti-Syrian March 14 Alliance.

== Consensus emerges ==
On 29 November 2007, opposition leader Michel Aoun announced that he was in favour of Michel Sleiman becoming the next president of Lebanon. A constitutional amendment will have to be passed with a two-thirds majority in Lebanon's parliament to allow military commanders to move directly into the presidential office, but it seems certain that the majority will be achieved with both Aoun and the 14 March Alliance in favour. On 3 December, the March 14 Alliance announced it would draft a constitutional amendment to allow Sleiman to become president.

Sleiman, however, threatened to withdraw from the presidential race if the parties were not able to come to agreement.

A compromise deal was finally reached on 21 May 2008 (dealing with the issues of a new electoral law, a unity government and Hezbollah's disarmament), leading to Sleiman's election on 25 May 2008 as planned. Out of the 127 votes, Sleiman received 118, while three members of parliament voted for others and six abstained.
