= 2008 French Polynesian presidential election =

- 24 February 2008
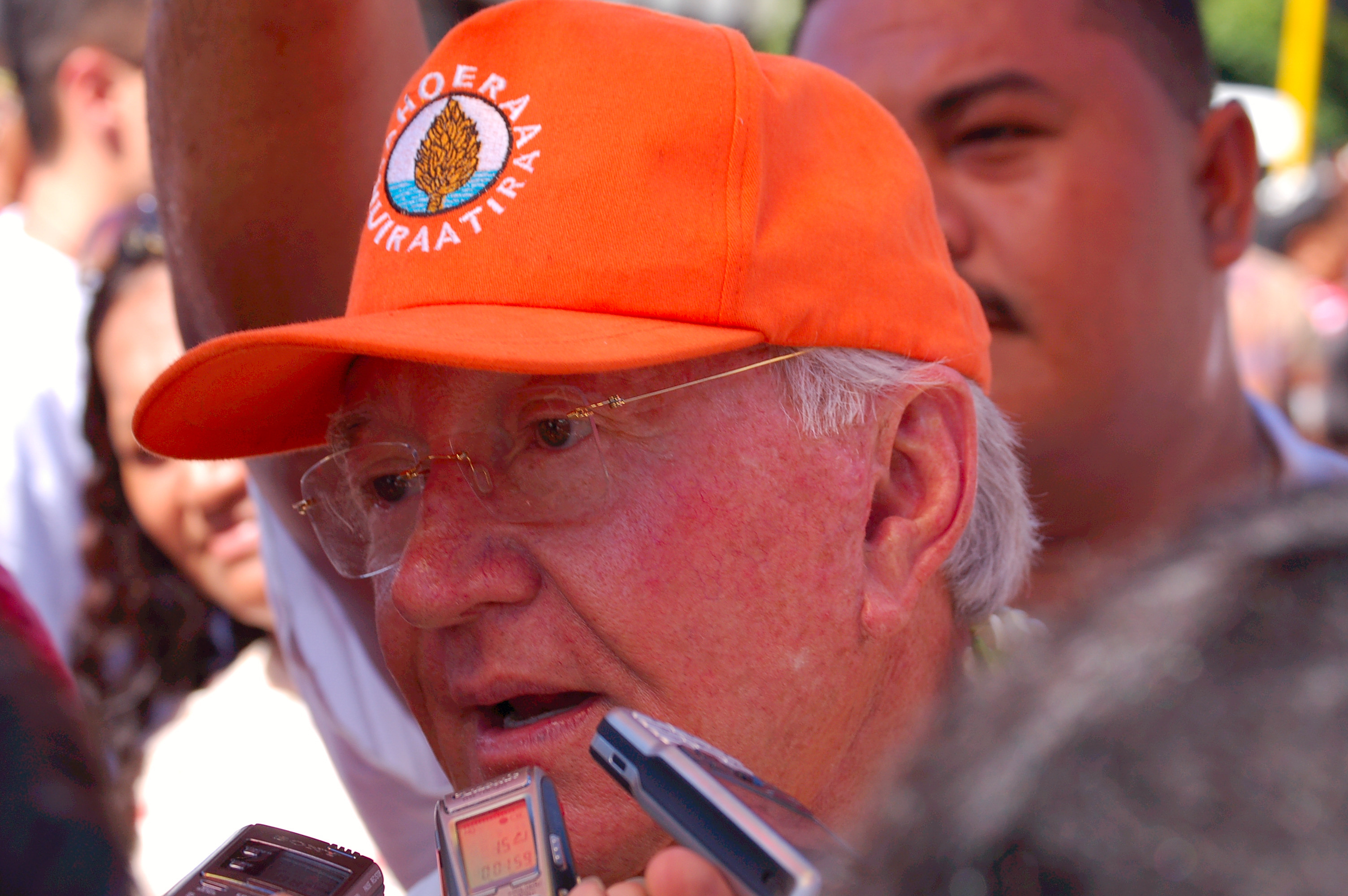

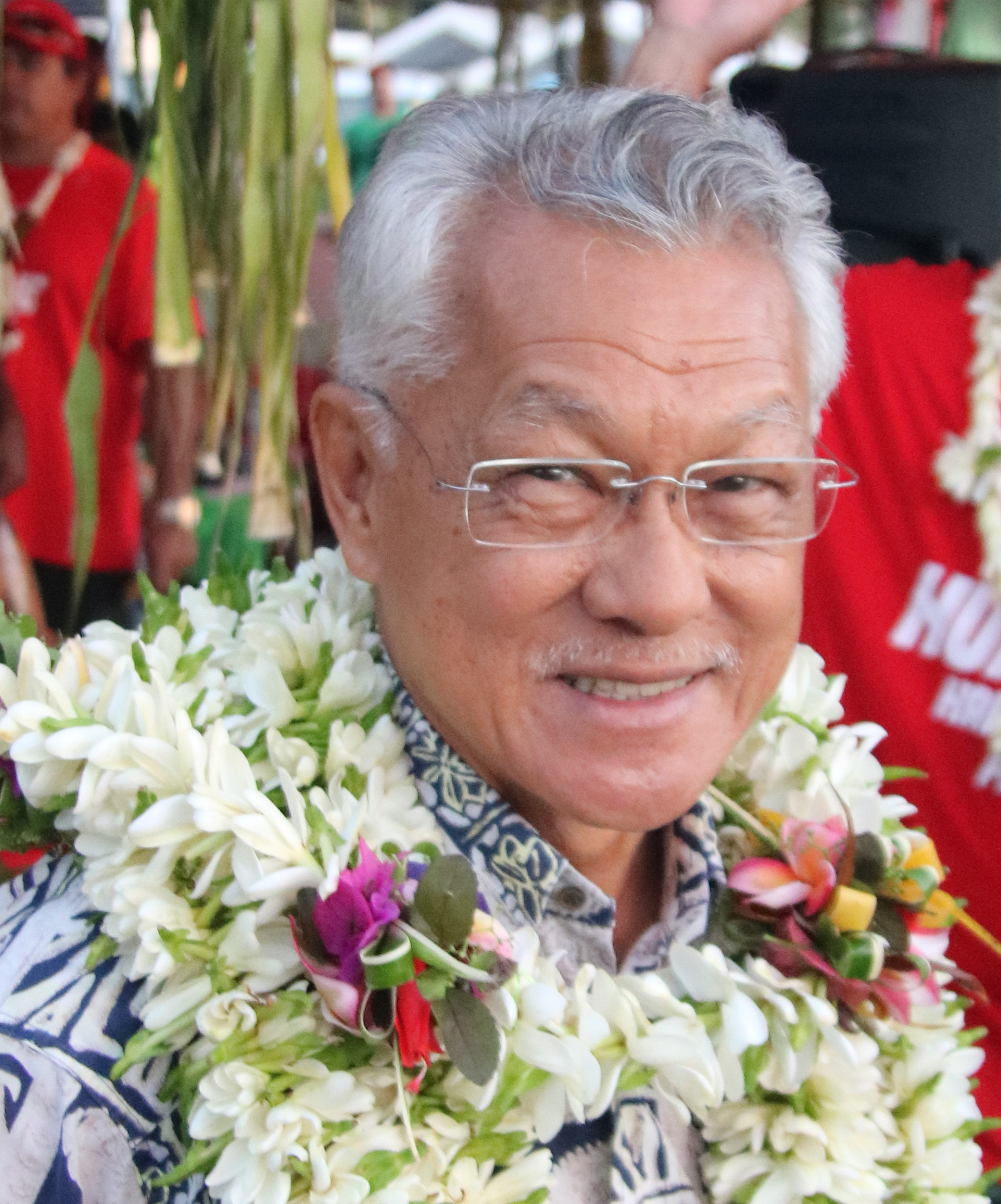
| Nominee | Gaston Flosse | Gaston Tong Sang |
| Party | Tahoera'a Huiraatira | PTA |
| Caucus vote | 29 | 27 |
| Percentage | 51.79% | 48.21% |
President before election
Gaston Flosse
Tahoera'a Huiraatira
Elected President
Gaston Flosse
Tahoera'a Huiraatira

An indirect presidential election was held in French Polynesia on 24 February 2008 following the legislative election held on 27 January and 10 February 2008. It had originally been planned to be held in late February or early March, but was brought forward after an agreement by the three party groups in the Assembly.

In the first two rounds, an absolute majority is required to be elected, and in the third round, a relative majority suffices; should two candidates be tied in the third round, the older one is declared elected.

Gaston Flosse was reelected with the support of the pro-independence Union for Democracy with 29 to 27 votes.
