= 2008 Mauritian presidential election =

An indirect presidential election was held in Mauritius on 19 September 2008. Anerood Jugnauth, who was first elected as president in 2003, was re-elected by the National Assembly in a unanimous vote, supported by both the government and the opposition.
