= 2008 Latvian constitutional referendum =

- 2 August 2008
- Do you support the adoption of the draft law 'Amending the Constitution of the Republic of Latvia'?
- Outcome: Proposal failed as less than 50% of registered voters voted in favour

Results
Choice	Votes	%
Yes	608,847	97.00%
No	18,857	3.00%
Valid votes	627,704	99.78%
Invalid or blank votes	1,415	0.22%
Total votes	629,119	100.00%
Registered voters/turnout	1,515,213	41.52%

A constitutional referendum to amend the constitution of Latvia in order to allow one-tenth of the total registered electorate to initiate a popular referendum to dissolve the Latvian parliament was held in Latvia on 2 August 2008.

The referendum on this issue was triggered when the Government of Latvia voted against an opposition motion to adopt this change to the constitution, which resulted in a referendum in Latvia by law. President Valdis Zatlers and the left-wing opposition were in favour of the referendum, while the government was against it, arguing that it would cause even more instability in a country which has seen 13 governments in the 18 years since independence. At least half of the total registered electorate (i.e. more than 757,607) had to approve the referendum proposal in order for it to be valid.

Preliminary results indicated that an overwhelming 96% of voters had voted in favour of the amendment, although only about 40% of the electorate voted in favour, which means the referendum is invalid. It is expected that the strong result, while failing to directly change the constitution, might press politicians to adopt a similar measure nonetheless.

If passed, the amendment would have represented the first time in an EU country that voters would have been able to dissolve their national parliament – a right traditionally reserved for the head of state.

== Background ==
The moves to initiate the referendum began in Autumn 2007 at a time of public discontent with the government which had led to the largest street protests to date in the post-Soviet era.

The movement to organise the referendum was led by the Free Trade Union Confederation of Latvia. The referendum also took place at a time of poor economic indicators with inflation exceeding 17 percent and economic growth expected to fall to near zero.

=== Procedure for calling a referendum ===
Under the ‘Latvian Law on National Referendums and Legislative Initiatives’, the procedure on calling popular referendums has several stages. The first stage involves the collection of 10,000 signatures certified by notaries, which are then presented to the Latvian Central Election Commission (CEC). Following positive verification of these signatures, the Latvian Government must then provide facilities for signature gathering in every town and village in the country, to enable the population to sign in favour of a proposal for a referendum.

In order to be successful, more than one-tenth of citizens eligible to vote in the previous parliamentary elections must sign in favour. Again, the signatures are verified by the CEC. If the 10% threshold is met, then the draft amendments are presented to the president who submits them to parliament for approval. If two thirds of MPs approve the changes at a sitting in which at least two thirds of the parliament is present then the changes are passed into law without the need for a referendum. If parliament rejects the laws, then a referendum is held.

== Collection of signatures ==
In the event, 11,095 signatures were initially collected and positively verified. Collection of further signatures then took place from March 12 to April 10, 2008 in 660 designated places, of which 40 were abroad. In total, counting the initial signatures, 217,567 voters supported the introduction of the draft amendments. A further 6,814 signatures were disqualified. In the vast majority of cases this was due to citizens signing more than once. However, 35 were disqualified due to not being Latvian citizens, 22 on the grounds of insanity, 62 who were deceased or could not be identified and 1 person who was under the age of 18 upon signing.

As the total number of valid signatures represented 14.6% of the electorate, the amendments were duly presented by the president to parliament, which rejected them on 5 June 2008. Accordingly, under the terms of the referendum law, a referendum had to be held not earlier than one month and not later than two months after rejection.

== Referendum campaign ==
=== "No" campaign ===
Opposing the referendum, Prime Minister Ivars Godmanis pointed out that political instability had also been a feature of pre-Soviet Latvia. He also argued that “Electing the parliament is a creative process, while a referendum would be a destructive process without any result." Parliamentary speaker Gundars Daudze argued that such referendums could create a huge crisis with neither parliament nor president operating. Meanwhile, the head of the People's Party in parliament, Māris Kučinskis, stated his belief that such referendums would allow a small number of people to change the election results. The advertisements of the no campaign also played on fears of Russian influence, with one advertisement, illustrated by pictures of ethnic Russian politicians from the opposition left wing parties playing a balalaika in a sauna, declaring “If you vote tomorrow, then you, brother, are crazy. In our places, the Russians will come. The Russians will come.”

=== "Yes" campaign ===
Former Prime Minister Einars Repše, a member of the opposition New Era party, argued that a yes vote of the majority of the electorate would be in accordance with basic democratic principles and that many contemporary Latvian politicians were working not for the state interest but for the interest of “Godfathers.” Civic Union party leader Sandra Kalniete also called for a yes vote on the grounds that the amendments could force MPs “to finally listen to the will of their voters.” For Human Rights in United Latvia MP Juris Sokolovskis supported a yes vote on the basis of perceived alienation of the electorate from their MPs and on the grounds that, even if the 50% quorum was not reached, a large yes majority would still be difficult for politicians to ignore.

== Results ==
Latvian constitutional referendum, 2008
Choice	Votes	%
For	608,847	97.00
Against	18,857	3.00
Total	627,704	100.00
Valid votes	627,704	99.78
Invalid/blank votes	1,415	0.22
Total votes	629,119	100.00
Registered voters/turnout		41.52
Turnout needed		50.00

== Reactions ==
Following the anticipated large yes vote, President Valdis Zatlers said the support shown was strong enough to prompt Parliament to adopt similar amendments on its own. "The rights of the people to dissolve the Parliament have to be included in the Constitution as soon as possible," Zatlers was quoted as saying by local news agency BNS. "If 40% want that, the duty of the Parliament is making it possible."
