= 2008 Latvian pensions law referendum =

- 23 August 2008
- Are you in favor of the legislative project to amend the National Pensions Act?
- Outcome: Proposal failed due to low voter turnout

Results
Choice	Votes	%
Yes	333,799	96.38%
No	12,524	3.62%
Valid votes	346,323	99.75%
Invalid or blank votes	859	0.25%
Total votes	347,182	100.00%
Registered voters/turnout	1,516,097	22.9%

A referendum on amendments in the pensions law was held in Latvia on 23 August 2008. It failed due to low turnout, as 453,730 votes (half of the votes cast in the previous parliamentary election) would have been necessary to make it valid. If it had succeeded, minimum pensions would have been tied (until the end of 2009) to the government-set subsistence benefit level with a higher coefficient than earlier, in effect tripling the minimum pension from 50 lati to at least 135 lati. The referendum was strongly supported by an organisation called Society for Different Politics, which aimed to become a political party.

== Results ==
Latvian pensions law referendum, 2008
Choice	Votes	%
For	333,799	96.38
Against	12,524	3.62
Total	346,323	100.00
Valid votes	346,323	99.77
Invalid/blank votes	794	0.23
Total votes	347,117	100.00
Registered voters/turnout	1,516,097	22.90
Turnout needed		50.00
Source: CVK, C2D
