= Senate district 70 – Ostrava-City =

Electoral district in the Czech Republic

70 – Ostrava-City
- inline Senate district of the Czech Republic

- The Ostrava-City district on a map
- Senator: Zdeněk Nytra; ODS
- Region: Moravian-Silesian
- District: Ostrava-City
- Last election: 2022
- Next election: 2028

Senate district 70 – Ostrava-City is electoral district to the Senate, upper house of the Parliament of the Czech Republic, comprising part of Ostrava-City District. The district is represented by Civic Democratic Senator Zdeněk Nytra.

== Senators ==
| Term | Senator | Party |
|---|---|---|
| 1996-2004 | Mirek Topolánek | ODS |
| 2004-2010 | Liana Janáčková | NEZ |
| 2010-2016 | Antonín Maštalíř | ČSSD |
| Since 2016 | Zdeněk Nytra | ODS |

== Election results ==
=== 1996 election ===
| Candidate | Party | First round | | Second round | |
| Candidate | Party | Votes | % | Votes | % |
|---|---|---|---|---|---|
| Mirek Topolánek | ODS | 9,416 | 37.9% | 12,322 | 51.3% |
| Jiří Smejkal | ČSSD | 5,639 | 22.7% | 11,692 | 48.7% |
| Otakar Podhajský | KSČM | 4,020 | 16.2% | | |
| Ilja Racek | KDU-ČSL | 2,444 | 9.9% | | |
| Miroslav Nejezchleba | ODA | 1,742 | 7.0% | | |
| František Vyhňák | Greens | 461 | 1.9% | | |
| Ladislav Vrchovský | ČSNS | 358 | 1.4% | | |
| Ladislav Kachel | DEU | 310 | 1.3% | | |
| Jozef Facuna | ROI | 262 | 1.1% | | |
| Jan Vozárik | SDS | 163 | 0.7% | | |

=== 1998 election ===
| Candidate | Party | First round | | Second round | |
| Candidate | Party | Votes | % | Votes | % |
|---|---|---|---|---|---|
| Mirek Topolánek | ODS | 9,551 | 39.4% | 9,269 | 63.3% |
| Jiří Grossmann | ČSSD | 4,858 | 20.0% | 5,375 | 36.7% |
| Josef Babka | KSČM | 4,851 | 20.0% | | |
| František Hromek | 4K | 4,022 | 16.6% | | |
| Václav Vápeník | DL | 992 | 4.1% | | |

=== 2004 election ===
| Candidate | Party | First round | | Second round | |
| Candidate | Party | Votes | % | Votes | % |
|---|---|---|---|---|---|
| Liana Janáčková | NEZ | 5,151 | 22.6% | 7,337 | 56.7% |
| Hana Heráková | ODS | 6,066 | 26.6% | 5,594 | 43.3% |
| Milan Peša | KSČM | 3,979 | 17.5% | | |
| Vojtěch Mynář | ČSSD | 2,680 | 11.8% | | |
| Jiří Hořínek | KDU-ČSL | 1,964 | 8,6% | | |
| Helena Fousková | SD-SN | 1,729 | 7.6% | | |
| Jan Černota | SNK | 623 | 2.7% | | |
| Maxmilián Šimek | SSPD-SP | 280 | 1.2% | | |
| Vladimír Smetana | Common Sense | 173 | 0.8% | | |
| Jaroslav Broulík | HNHRM | 142 | 0.6% | | |

=== 2010 election ===
| Candidate | Party | First round | | Second round | |
| Candidate | Party | Votes | % | Votes | % ' |
|---|---|---|---|---|---|
| Antonín Maštalíř | ČSSD | 8,561 | 23.7% | 12,091 | 53.0% |
| Liana Janáčková | NEZ | 8,922 | 24.7% | 10,707 | 47,0% |
| Lukáš Ženatý | ODS | 5,725 | 15.9 | | |
| Justina Kamenná | KSČM | 4,507 | 12.5% | | |
| Tomáš Čermák | TOP 09 | 4 271 | 11,84 | | |
| Zbyněk Pražák | KDU-ČSL | 1,782 | 4,9% | | |
| Aleš Dobrozemský | VV | 1,101 | 3.1% | | |
| Zdeněk Pavlíček | Common Sense | 752 | 2,10 | | |
| Radoslav Štědroň | ProOstr. | 449 | 1.2% | | |

=== 2016 election ===
The 2016 election was held as part of the 2016 Czech Senate election. Independent candidate Liana Janáčková was considered the front-runner of the election. Social democratic candidate Josef Pravda was considered her main rival. Janáčková was eventually defeated by Zdeněk Nytra, candidate of right wing parties. First candidates appeared in March 2016. Incumbent senator Antonín Maštalíř decided to not run. ODS decided to nominate Chairman of Moravia-Silesian firefighters Zdeněk Nytra. Nytra stated that he wants to geet support from other right wing parties, notably TOP 09. TOP 09 endorsed Nytra in April 2016. Nytra was eventually registered as an independent candidate due to a conflict of his partisan affiliation with a newly passed law that banned him from running as a partisan candidate due to his position as a Chairman of Firefighters. Nytra also received support from Freeholder Party. Christian democrats nominated former Chairman of Czech television Ilja Racek. Communists nominated Ivan Strachoň. Political movement NEZ nominated Liana Janáčková, Mayor of Mariánské Hory. Social democrats were yet to decide their nominee. Social democratic nomination was pursued by Josef Pravda, Vladimír Majer and Marian Starý. In April 2016, Social democrats nominated Josef Pravda. ANO nominated Radim Babinec. Dawn – National Coalition nominated Chairwoman of Czech energetic regulation bureau Alena Vitásková who faced criminal trial for corruption. Janáčková was considered front-runner while Social democratic nominee Josef Pravda was seen as her main rival. Zdeněk Nytra was also considered a serious contender. There were 10 candidates overall. Zdeněk Nytra ran a contact campaign. He was attending meetings with people. Nytra stated that he wants to focus on safety and readability of laws if he is elected. Liana Janáčková also led campaign for regional election. Her campaign gained attention for giving matches to voters. Candidate of Dawn Alena Vitásková focused during campaign on Zdeněk Bakala. She promised to ensure investigation of OKD case. Vitásková herself faced criminal trial which led to suspicion that she wants to get immunity by winning the election. First round was held on 7 and 8 October 2016. Janáčková received highest number of votes. Zdeněk Nytra also advanced to second round. Janáčková stated that she is looking forward to a fair duel with Nytra. Nytra stated that he si glad but also noted that his rival is strong and hard to defeat. He also admitted that he didn't expect that he will advance to the second round. Janáčková was considered front runner for the second round. Second round was held on 14 and 15 October 2016. Nytra eventually defeated Janáčková by a narrow margin.

Janáčková showed disappointment with the result. She stated that she lost because she didn't have support of strong parties and everybody united against her. She also blamed her defeat on low turnout. Nytra was pleased by the result. He stated that result could have been influenced by the fact that Janáčková also ran in regional election which some people take unpleasantly.

NEZ later challenged the result at court. They argued that Nytra wasn't in fact an independent candidate because of his support from ODS and TOP 09. In November, 2016 court declined the complaint.

| Candidate | Party | First round | | Second round | |
| Candidate | Party | Votes | % | Votes | % |
|---|---|---|---|---|---|
| Zdeněk Nytra | NK | 4,569 | 15.44 | 6,058 | 51.81 |
| Liana Janáčková | NEZ | 5,777 | 19.53 | 5,634 | 48.18 |
| Radim Babinec | ANO 2011 | 4,258 | 14.39 | | |
| Alena Vitásková | Dawn | 3,599 | 12.16 | | |
| Ivan Strachoň | KSČM | 2,635 | 8.90 | | |
| Ilja Racek | KDU-ČSL | 2,577 | 8.71 | | |
| Josef Pravda | ČSSD | 2,303 | 7.78 | | |
| Tomáš Málek | Ostravak | 2,147 | 7.25 | | |
| Jan Becher | Pirates | 1,289 | 4.35 | | |
| Petr Borna | DSSS | 423 | 1.43 | | |

=== 2022 election ===
| Candidate | Party | First round | | Second round | |
| Candidate | Party | Votes | % | Votes | % |
|---|---|---|---|---|---|
| Zdeněk Nytra | KDU-ČSL, ODS, TOP 09 | 8,405 | 25.42 | 7,215 | 51.53 |
| Miroslav Antl | ANO 2011 | 7,452 | 22.53 | 6,786 | 48.46 |
| Hana Zelená | PRO 2022 | 4,642 | 14.03 | | |
| Peter Harvánek | SPD | 4,312 | 13.04 | | |
| Liana Janáčková | PRO Zdraví | 4,276 | 12.93 | | |
| Patrik Hujdus | STAN | 3,581 | 10.83 | | |
| Radoslav Štědroň | SSPD-SP | 396 | 1.19 | | |
