= Zdeněk Nytra =

Czech politician

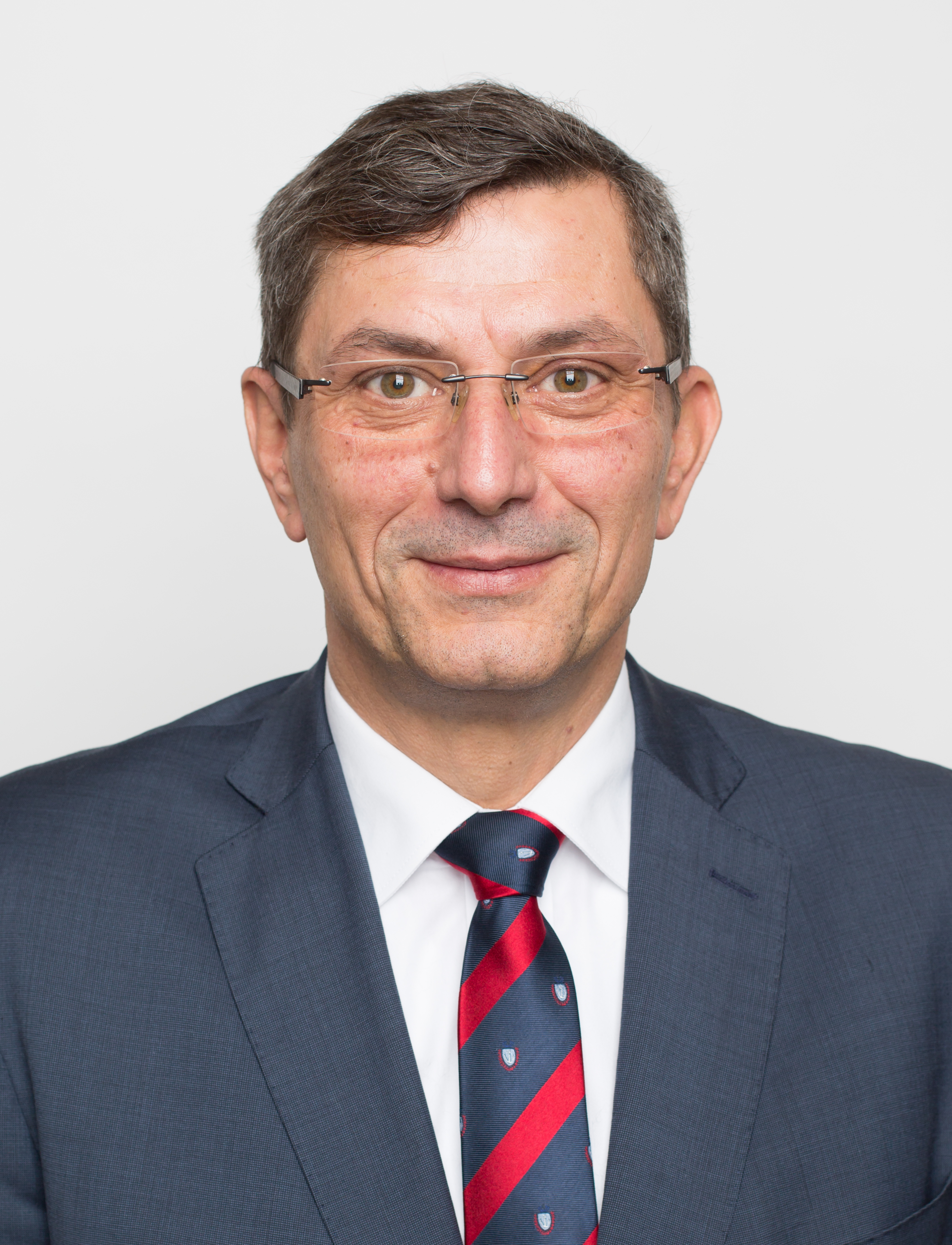

Leader of the ODS+TOP 09 Group in the Senate
- Incumbent
- Assumed office 13 October 2020
- Preceded by: Martin Červíček

Senator from Ostrava
- Incumbent
- Assumed office 15 October 2016
- Preceded by: Antonín Maštalíř

Personal details
- Born: 6 October 1961 (age 64) Frýdek-Místek, Czechoslovakia
- Party: ODS
- Education: VSB – Technical University of Ostrava

Zdeněk Nytra (born 6 October 1961) is a Czech politician. He has been Senator from Ostrava since 2016.

== Biography ==
Nytra studied at Technical University of Ostrava. He became a professional fireman in 1984. He started as a commander of Fireman's corp for protection of trains in Ostrava. He joined Firemen's security corps of Ostrava in 1991. In 2001 he became Chairman of Firemen's security corps of Moravian-Silesian Region.

== Political career ==
He ran for Proskovice municipal assembly in 2002 election as a candidate of the Civic Democratic Party. He wasn't elected but in 2006 he became a member of Moravská Ostrava a Přívoz assembly. He was reelected in 2010 and 2014 election.

He decided to run for Senate in 2016 election. He officially ran as an independent but was supported by Civic Democratic Party, TOP 09 and Freeholder Party of the Czech Republic. He advanced to the second round and narrowly defeated Liana Janáčková.

During 2018 presidential election, Nytra endorsed Mirek Topolánek.

Nytra leads the Civic Democratic Party during 2018 municipal election.
