= 2022 Ostrava municipal election =

Municipal election of the Czech Republic

2018 Ostrava municipal election
← 2018	23-24 September 2022	2026 →

All 55 seats in the Assembly 28 seats needed for a majority
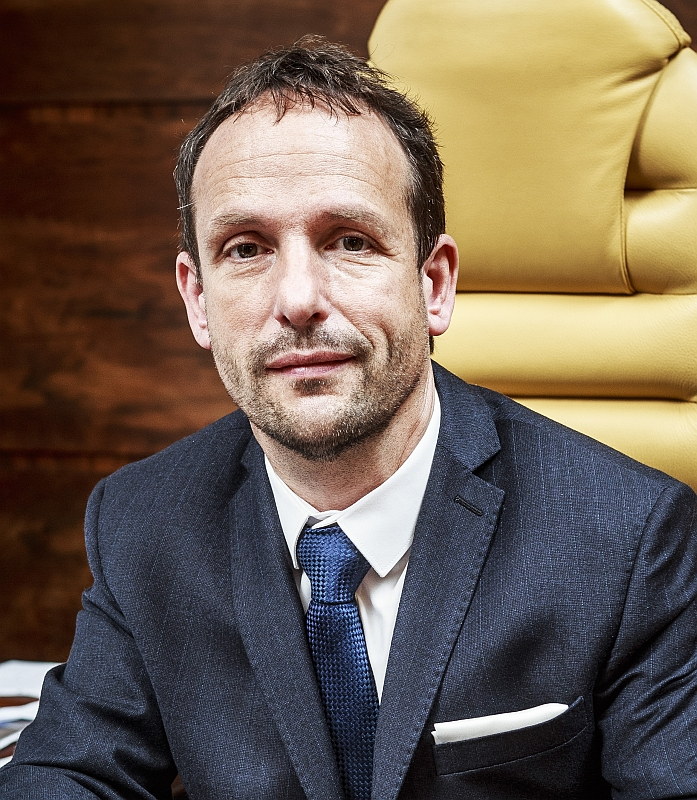

	First party	Second party	Third party
Leader	Tomáš Macura	Jan Dohnal	Lukáš Semerák
Party	ANO	ODS	Ostravak
Alliance		SPOLU
Last election	21 seats	9 seats	7 seats
Seats won	21	9	8
Popular vote	1,315,173	554,705	489,598
Percentage	34.0%	14.3%	12.6%
	Fourth party	Fifth party	Sixth party
Leader	Václav Kubín	Jiří Jureček	Andrea Hoffmannová
Party	SPD	STAN	Pirates
Last election	4 seats	0 seats	5 seats
Seats won	7	4	3
Popular vote	449,945	262,840	224,812
Percentage	11.6%	6.8%	5.8%
	Seventh party
Leader	Martin Juroška
Party	KSČM
Alliance	Ostrava Left
Last election	3 seats
Seats won	3
Popular vote	210,253
Percentage	5.4%
Mayor before election
Tomáš Macura
ANO
Elected mayor
Tomáš Macura
ANO

The 2022 Ostrava municipal election was held on 23 and 24 September 2022 as part of the nationwide municipal elections. ANO 2011 has won the third election in row.

== Background ==
Previous election was held in 2018. ANO 2011 won the election with Tomáš Macura being reelected as the Mayor. ANO formed coalition with ODS, KDU-ČSL and Pirates. Macura decided to run for reelection in 2022. ODS, KDU-ČSL and TOP 09 decided to run under Spolu alliance banner with Jan Dohnal as electoral leader. Ostravak is once again led by Lukáš Semerák.

== Opinion polls ==
Polling firm	Fieldwork date	Sample size	Turnout	ANO	Ostravak	SPOLU			KSČM	Piráti	SPD	ČSSD	STAN	Oth.	Lead
Polling firm	Fieldwork date	Sample size	Turnout	ANO	Ostravak	ODS	KDU– ČSL	TOP 09	KSČM	Piráti	SPD	ČSSD	STAN	Oth.	Lead
Sanep	11 - 20 August 2022			30.2	12.1	14.8			N/A	7.2	8.4	5.7	5.3	16.3	15.4
Phoenix Research	20 July - 12 August 2022	1,016		31.6	9.9	11.2			N/A	9.2	8.0	5.6	4.7		20.4
Phoenix Research	20 June - 13 July 2022			34.3	9.8	11.3			4.5	8.7	7.9	5.4	4.2	13.9	23.0
Phoenix Research	20 May - 13 June 2022	998		33.1	9.9	11.2			4.2	7.6	7.5	5.3	7.6	12.6	21.9
Sanep	1-8 March 2022	5,116	35.7	29.8	12.3	10.8	6.1	1.1	5.3	4.1	8.3	N/A	5.9	16.3	17.5
2018 election	5 and 6 October 2018		33.9	32.7	11.5	9.7	5.8	—	9.0	9.0	6.8	5.5	3.0	7.1	21.2

== Result ==
Party	Votes	%	Seats
ANO 2011	1,315,173	33.97%	21
Spolu	554,705	14.33%	9
Ostravak	489,598	12.64%	8
Freedom and Direct Democracy	449,945	11.62%	7
Mayors and Independents	262,840	6.79%	4
Czech Pirate Party	224,812	5.81%	3
Ostrava Left - KSČM and NK	210.253	5.43%	3
Czech Social Democratic Party and LEČO	149,974	3.87%	0
Přísaha	72,882	1.88%	0
Yes, We return water to people	55,217	1.43%	0
Swiss Democracy	33,828	0.87%	0
Silesian for People	26,647	0.69%	0
Tricolour Citizens' Movement	25,779	0.67%	0
Democratic Party of Greens	403	0.1%	0
