= 2014 Ostrava municipal election =

- 10–11 October 2014

All 55 seats in the Assembly 28 seats needed for a majority
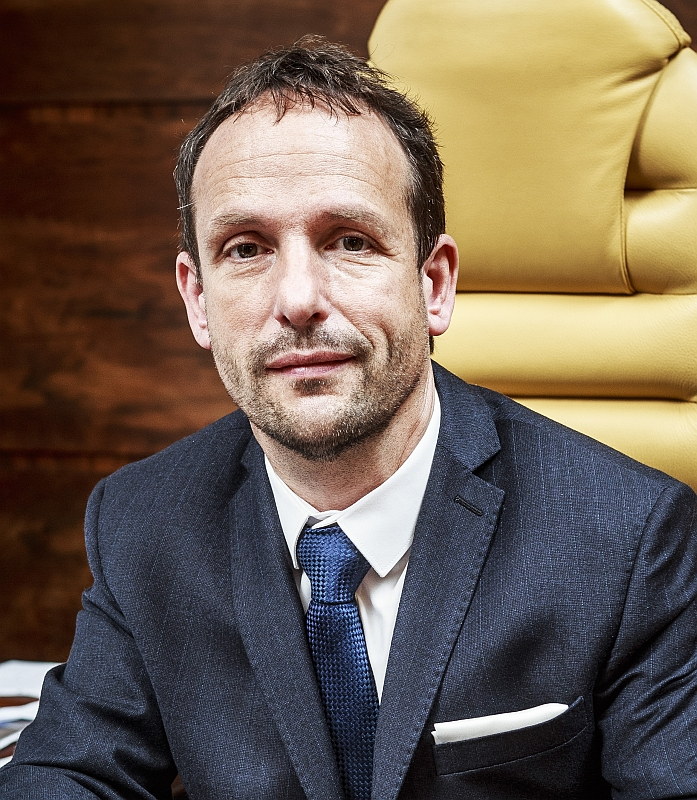

	First party	Second party	Third party
Leader	Tomáš Macura	Lumír Palyza	Lukáš Semerák
Party	ANO	ČSSD	Ostravak
Seats won	15	12	10
Popular vote	740,392	562,612	477,259
Percentage	21.3%	16.2%	13.8%
	Fourth party	Fifth party	Sixth party
Leader	Martin Juroška	Zbyněk Pražák	Martin Štěpánek
Party	KSČM	Christian and Democratic Union – Czechoslovak People's Party	ODS
Seats won	10	4	4
Popular vote	465,762	214 496	200,545
Percentage	13.4%	6.2%	5.8%
Mayor before election
Petr Kajnar
ČSSD
Elected mayor
Tomáš Macura
ANO 2011

Municipal election in Ostrava was held as part of Czech municipal elections in 2014. It was a victory of ANO 2011. Tomáš Macura then became new Mayor when he formed coalition with ČSSD and KDU-ČSL.

== Results ==
Party	Votes	%	Seats
ANO 2011	740,392	21.34	15
Czech Social Democratic Party	562,612	16.22	12
Ostravak	477,259	13.76	10
Communist Party of Bohemia and Moravia	465,762	13.43	10
Christian and Democratic Union – Czechoslovak People's Party	214 496	6.18	4
Civic Democratic Party	200,545	5.78	4
Ostrava Forum	171,858	4.95	0
Independents	130,790	3.77	0
We are Ostrava - SZ and Pirates	105,374	3.04	0
TOP 09	96,119	2.77	0
Torys	62,675	1.81	0
Dawn of Direct Democracy	56,124	1.62	0
Change for Ostrava	46,496	1.34	0
Party of Free Citizens	44,431	1.28	0
Workers' Party of Social Justice	29,518	0.85	0
National Socialists - Left of the 21st century	27,468	0.79	0
Roma Democratic Party	23,619	0.68	0
Party of Civic Rights	13,282	0.38	0

== Aftermath ==
ANO 2011 originally intended to form coalition with Ostravak and refused to negotiate with ČSSD. ANO negotiated with OStravak, KDU-ČSL and ODS. Negotiations were unsuccessful and Ostravak agreed to form coalition with ČSSD and KSČM. This coalition broke quickly afterwards giving ANO 2011 new opportunity. Coalition was finally formed between ANO, ČSSD and KDU-ČSL and leader of Ostravan ANO Tomáš Macura became new Mayor.

Coalition ruled Ostrava until December 2015 when ĆSSD and KDU-ČSL left the coalition. ANO 2011 the formed new coalition with ODS and Ostravak.
