= Bart Van der Bruggen =

Belgian academic and researcher (born 1972)

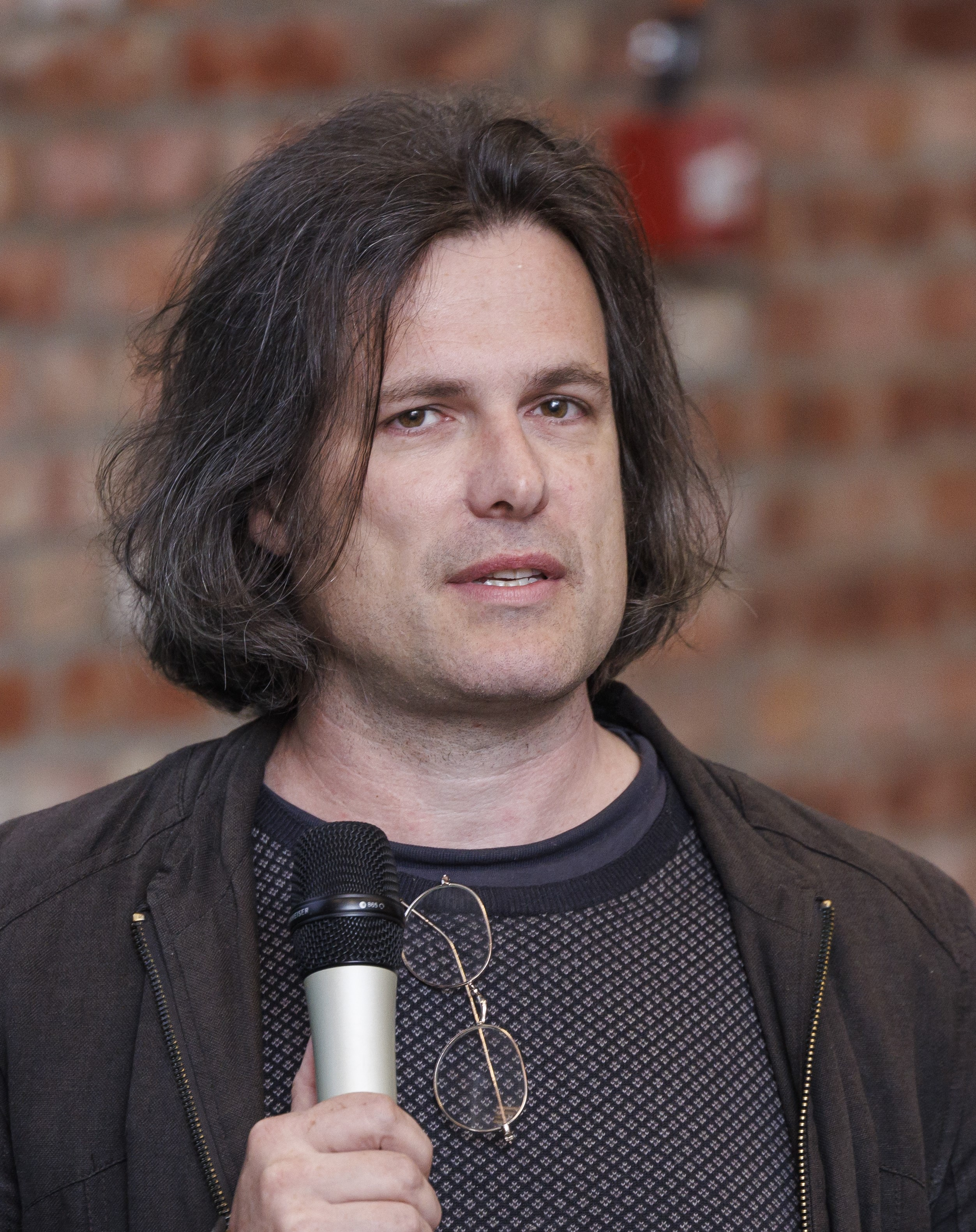

Bart Van der Bruggen (Chinese: 巴特·范德布鲁根; born 14 October 1972) is a Belgian chemical engineer and academic specializing in membrane science and separation processes. He has been at KU Leuven since 2004, and serves as a full professor in the Department of Chemical Engineering at KU Leuven since October 2009. He has also served as an extraordinary professor at Tshwane University of Technology (Pretoria, South Africa) since 2014, at the Technical University of Ostrava (Czech Republic) since 2025, and an Adjunct Professor at Korea University (K-Club) from March 2025 until 2026.

== Early life and education ==
Bart Van der Bruggen was born on born 14 October 1972. He studied chemical engineering at KU Leuven, where he obtained his master’s degree in 1995. He completed his doctoral studiesin Applied Science, Chemical Engineering, at KU Leuven in 2000. His dissertation was "Removal of organic molecules from aqueous solution by nanofiltration".

After his PhD, he was awarded a postdoctoral fellowship by the FWO-Vlaanderen (Fund for Scientific Research-Flanders). During thus period, he carried out research as a visiting scholar at the University of North Carolina at Chapel Hill in the United States, the Institute for Membrane Technology in Calabria, Italy, and Lappeenranta University of Technology in Finland.

== Academic career ==
Van der Bruggen began his academic career at KU Leuven, where he held various teaching and research positions. From 2002 to 2004, he served as a part-time Lecturer, followed by a role as a Lecturer from 2004 to 2006, and later as a Senior Lecturer from 2006 to 2009. In October 2013, he was promoted to Full Professor at KU Leuven.

In addition to his home institution, he has held visiting academic and research positions at Università della Calabria and ITM-CNR, Italy, Lappeenranta University of Technology (LUT), Finland, and Dalian University of Technology, China.

== Research contributions ==
Van der Bruggen has authored and co-authored more than 750 international peer-reviewed publications. His work has been widely cited, with more than 74,000 citations, and h index of 134.

He has held several editorial positions in scientific publishing. He has served as Editor-in-Chief of the journal Separation and Purification Technology and as Executive Editor of the Journal of Chemical Technology and Biotechnology. He has also been a member of the editorial boards of journals in the field, including the Journal of Membrane Science, Journal of Applied Polymer Science, and Process Safety and Environmental Protection.

In addition to his editorial work, he has been involved in professional societies related to membrane science. He served in the Council of the European Membrane Society (EMS) from 2007 to 2011, and was Vice-President (2009–2011); in a second term from 2013 to 2017, he was President of the EMS. He served as the Founding President of World Association of Membrane Societies (WA-MS), for which WA-MS from 2017 to 2020.

== Awards and honors ==
- Winner of the Prince Sultan Bin Abdulaziz International Prize for Water, 4th Award (2008–2010) in the 3rd Branch – Alternative (Non-traditional) Water Resources.
- 2006, Laureate of the Koninklijke Vlaamse Academie van België voor Wetenschappen en Kunsten (Royal Flemish Academy of Belgium for Sciences and Arts) in the class of Nature Sciences.
- Winner of the Annual Award of the European Membrane Society (EMS) for the best journal paper on membrane science and engineering published in 2002.
- 2001, Winner of the Textile Innovation Award (awarded by the Federation of the Flemish textile industry, Centexbel).
