= 2018 Ostrava municipal election =

Elections in Czechia

- 5 and 6 October 2018

All 55 seats in the Assembly 28 seats needed for a majority
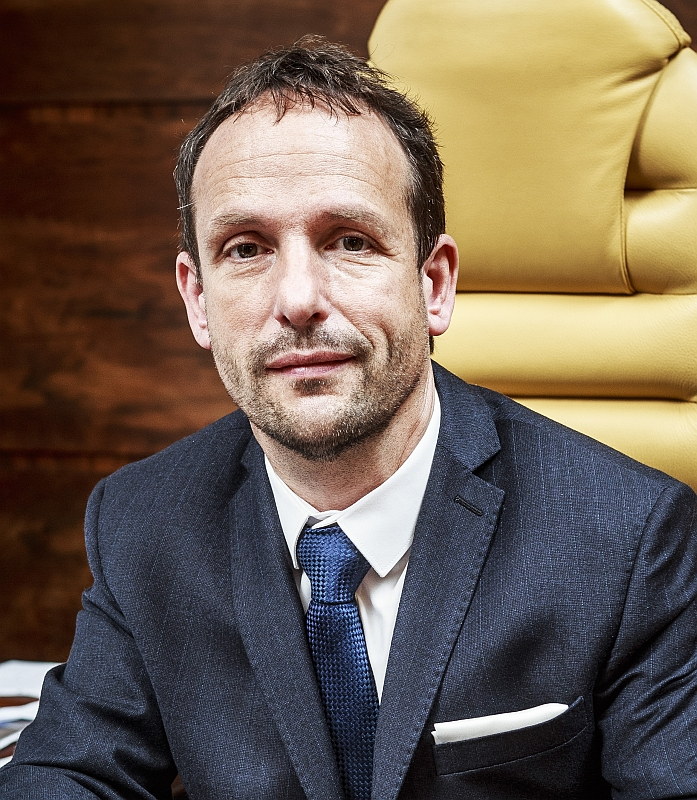

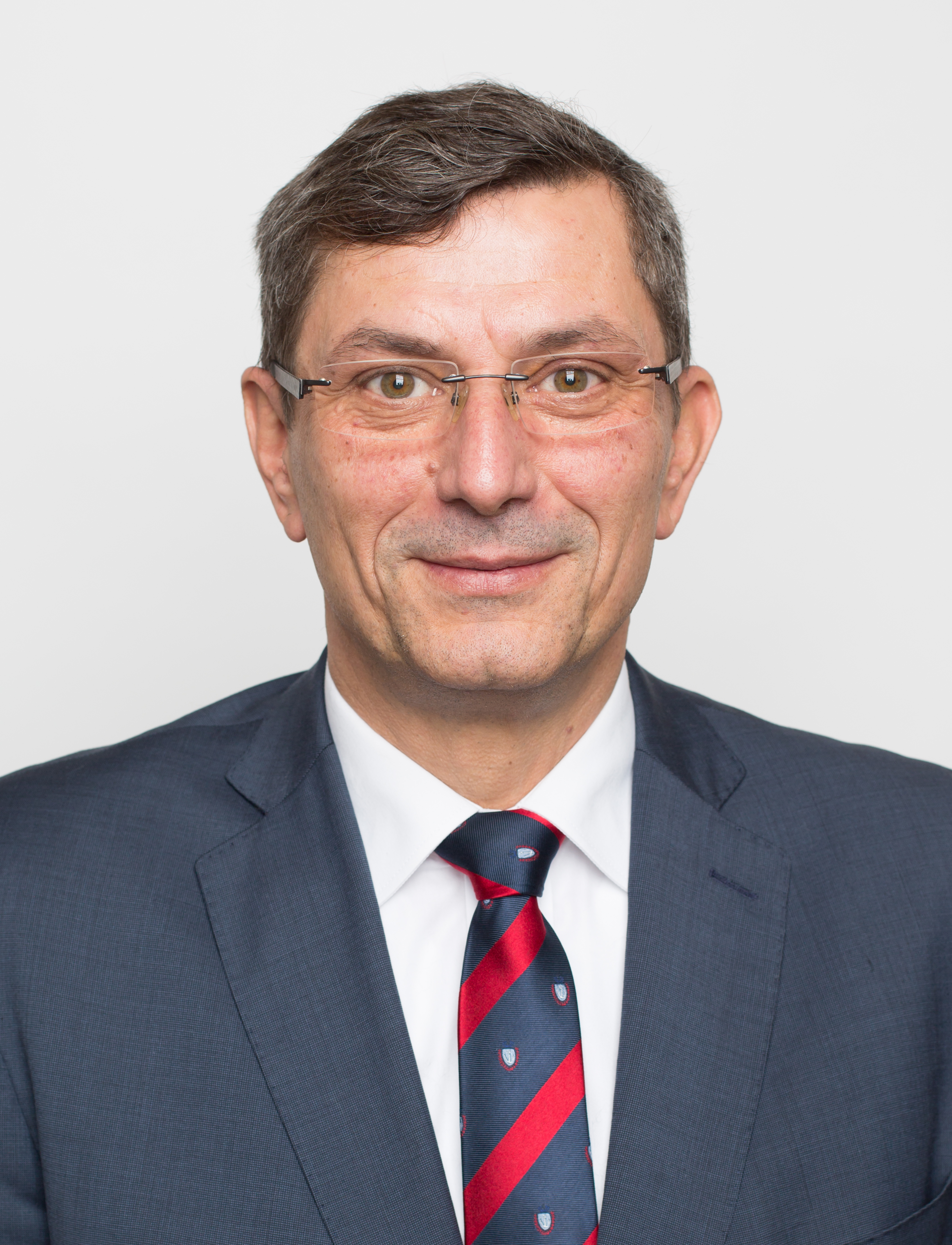

	First party	Second party	Third party
Leader	Tomáš Macura	Lukáš Semerák	Zdeněk Nytra
Party	ANO	Ostravak	ODS
Seats won	21	7	6
Popular vote	1,273,101	447,207	378,658
Percentage	32.72%	11.49%	9.73%
	Fourth party	Fifth party	Sixth party
Leader	Martin Juroška	David Witosz	Václav Kubín
Party	KSČM	Pirates	SPD
Seats won	6	5	4
Popular vote	348,514	348,337	263,323
Percentage	8.96%	8.95%	6.77%
	Seventh party	Eighth party
Leader	Zbyněk Pražák	Jiří Srba
Party	Christian and Democratic Union – Czechoslovak People's Party	ČSSD
Seats won	3	3
Popular vote	226,779	215,047
Percentage	5.83%	5.53%
Mayor before election
Tomáš Macura
ANO
Elected mayor
Tomáš Macura
ANO

Municipal election in Ostrava was held as part of Czech municipal elections in 2018.

== Current composition of assembly ==
Party	Seats
ANO 2011	15
Ostravak	10
Communist Party of Bohemia and Moravia	10
Czech Social Democratic Party	7
Christian and Democratic Union - Czechoslovak People's Party	4
Civic Democratic Party	4

== Background ==
=== Previous election ===
Previous election was held in 2014. ANO 2011 has won the election. ANO then negotiated with Ostravak, KDU-ČSL and ODS about possible coalition. Negotiations were unsuccessful and Ostravak agreed to form coalition with ČSSD and KSČM. This coalition broke quickly afterwards giving ANO 2011 new opportunity. Coalition was finally formed between ANO, ČSSD and KDU-ČSL and leader of Ostravan ANO Tomáš Macura became new Mayor. Coalition ruled Ostrava until December 2015 when ĆSSD and KDU-ČSL left the coalition. ANO 2011 the formed new coalition with ODS and Ostravak.

=== Campaign ===
ANO 2011 decided to nominate incumbent Mayor Romáš Macura as its leader on 20 January 2018.

The Civic Democratic Party (ODS) announced on 12 February 2018 that Senator Zdeněk Nytra will lead party in the election. TOP 09 and Freeholder Party of the Czech Republic decided to support ODS in the election.

Czech Social Democratic Party (ČSSD) had to deal with inner problems during March 2018. 6 deputies left the party. It reduced ČSSD to only 7 seats in Assembly. Deputies who left the party, included Lumír Palyza who led the party in previous election.

== Opinion polls ==
Date	Company	ANO 2011	ČSSD	Ostravak	KSČM	KDU-ČSL	ODS	SPD	Piráti	Others
22 Jun 2018	Phoenix Research	34.0	10.9	—N/a	9.2	4.0	8.3	14.0	7.6	7.3
1 - 10 Jun 2018	Sanep	32.2	8.1	4.0	9.2	4.1	10.2	16.2	10.1	5.9
22 Mar - 13 Apr 2018	Phoenix Research	35.1	9.7	—N/a	8.8	3.1	8.7	14.5	8.2	11.9

== Result ==
Party	Leader	Votes	%	Seats
ANO 2011 (ANO)	Tomáš Macura	1,273,101	32.72	21
Ostravak	Lukáš Semerák	447,207	11.49	7
Civic Democratic Party (ODS)	Zdeněk Nytra	378,658	9.73	6
Communist Party of Bohemia and Moravia (KSČM)	Martin Juroška	348,514	8.96	6
Czech Pirate Party (Piráti)	David Witosz	348,337	8.95	5
Freedom and Direct Democracy (SPD)	Václav Kubín	263,323	6.77	4
Christian and Democratic Union – Czechoslovak People's Party and Independents	Zbyněk Pražák	263,323	5.83	3
Czech Social Democratic Party (ČSSD)	Jiří Srba	215,047	5.53	3
Better clean Ostrava		151,975	3.91	0
Mayors and Independents (STAN)		115,314	2.96	0
INDEPENDENTS		101,318	2.60	0
DSSS, SSPD-SP		15,303	0.39	0
Safety, Responsibility, Soliarity		5,794	0.15	0
JAUNER Czechoslovakia 2018		85	0	0
Total		3,890,934	100	55
