= Liana Janáčková =

Czech architect and politician

Mayor of Mariánské Hory a Hulváky
- In office 1990 – 6 November 2006
- Preceded by: Position established
- Succeeded by: Radomír Michniak
- In office 6 June 2007 – 5 November 2018
- Preceded by: Radomír Michniak
- Succeeded by: Patrik Hujdus

Senator from Ostrava
- In office 23 November 1996 – 21 November 2004
- Preceded by: Mirek Topolánek
- Succeeded by: Antonín Maštalíř

Personal details
- Born: 17 December 1953 (age 72) Ostrava, Czechoslovakia (now Czech Republic)
- Party: Civic Forum; Civic Democratic Party (1992–2004); Svobodní (2009); Independents (2014–2022); Motorists for Themselves (since 2025)
- Children: 2
- Education: Brno University of Technology

Liana Janáčková (born 17 December 1953) is a Czech politician, former mayor of the Mariánské Hory a Hulváky district of Ostrava and a senator.

== Biography ==
She studied at the Faculty of Architecture of Brno University of Technology, before working at Stavoprojekt Ostrava and Drupos Ostrava.

== Political career ==
She became Mayor of Mariánské Hory a Hulváky in 1990 and joined the Civic Democratic Party (ODS). She left ODS in 2004. She was replaced by Radomír Michniak in 2006. She returned to the position in 2007.

In 2004, Janáčková was elected to the Senate as a nominee of the Svobodní. She left the party in 2009. She sought a second term in 2010 election but was defeated by Antonín Maštalíř.

In the 2013 Czech parliamentary election, she ran as a leader of the Head Up – Electoral Bloc in the Moravian-Silesian Region, but was not elected.

She also ran for Senate in 2016, 2020, 2022 and 2024, but was not elected.

In 2025, Janáčková joined the Motorists for Themselves. In the 2025 Czech parliamentary election, she ran as the third candidate in the Moravian-Silesian Region, but was not elected.
