= Hulváky =

City part of Ostrava, Czech Republic

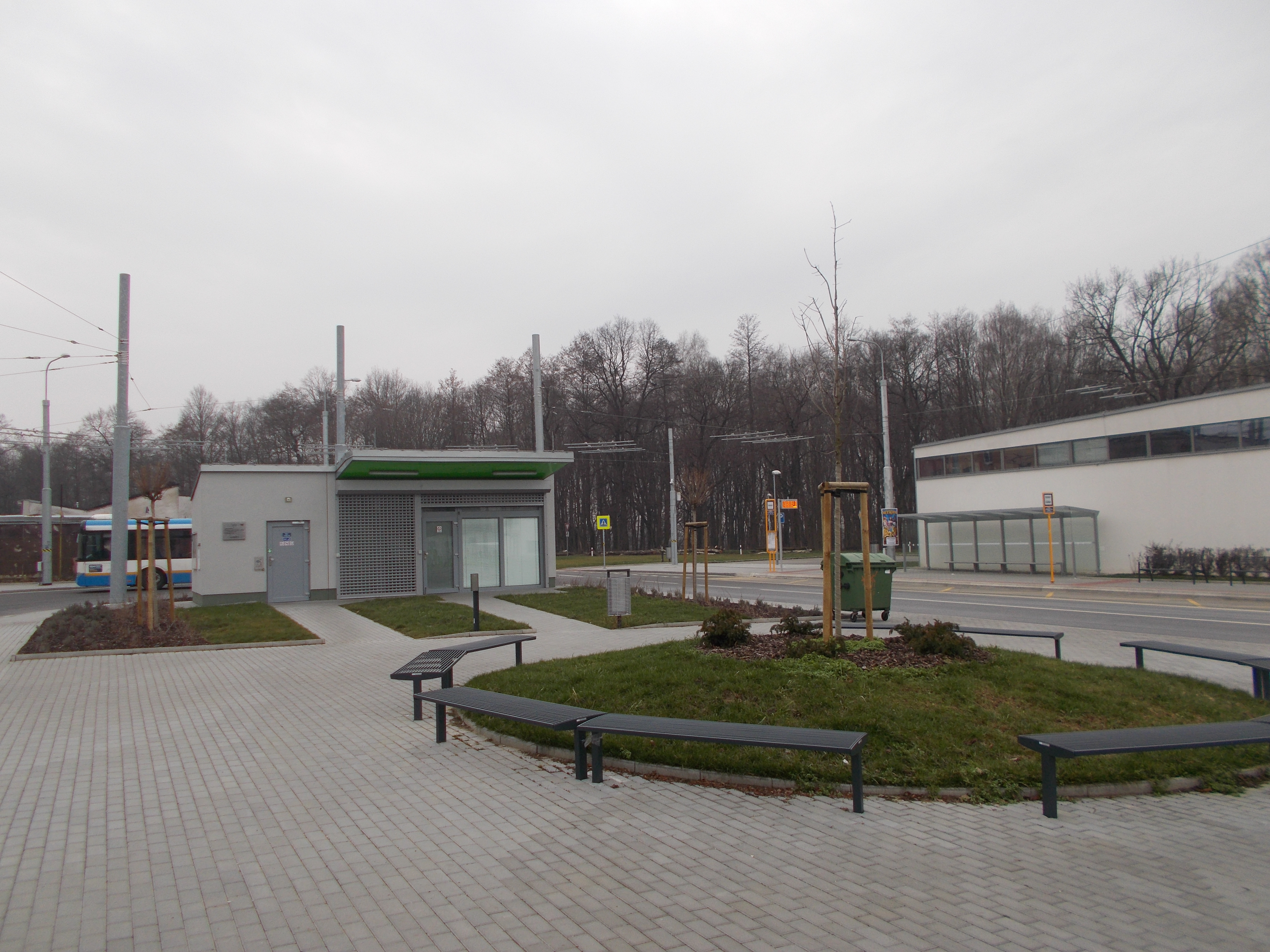
Transport terminal in Hulváky

Hulváky is a part of the Mariánské Hory a Hulváky city borough in Ostrava, Czech Republic. Originally, it was administratively part of the nearby area of Zábřeh. On 24 November 1990, Hulváky was merged with Mariánské Hory to form one of the 23 self-governing boroughs of Ostrava.
