= Mariánské Hory =

Municipal part of Ostrava, Czech Republic

Coordinates: 49°49′57″N 18°15′8″E

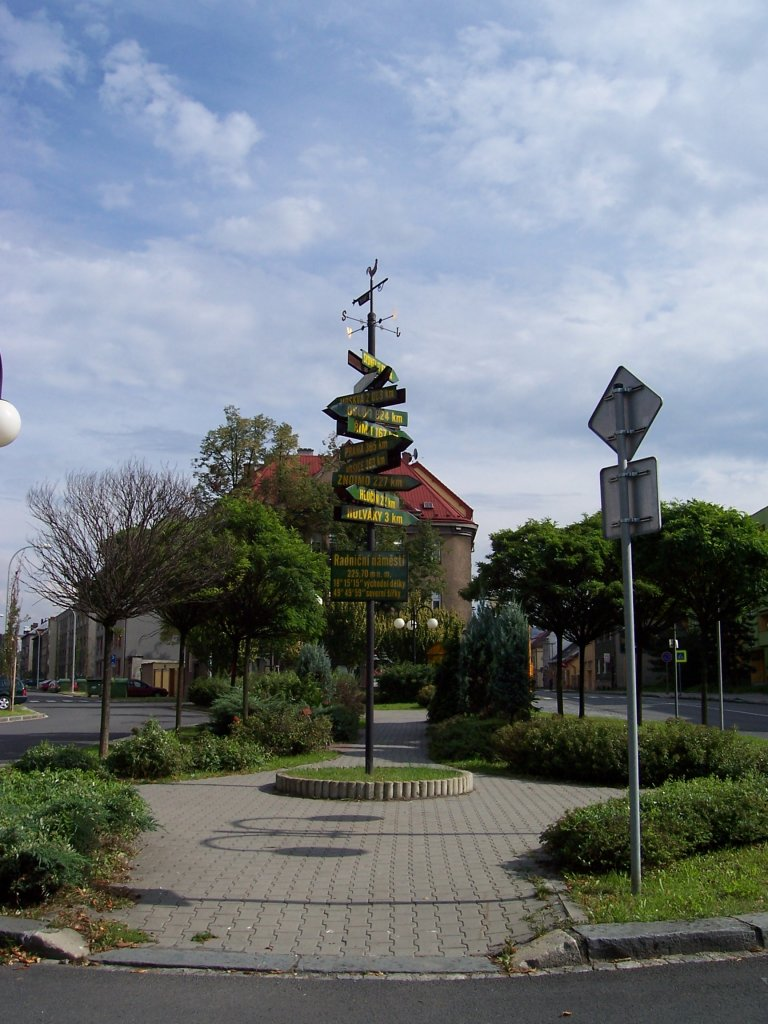
Radniční náměstí square

Mariánské Hory is a municipal part of the city of Ostrava, Czech Republic. Originally a separate town, it was merged with Ostrava on 1 January 1924. On 24 November 1990, Mariánské Hory was merged with Hulváky to form the Mariánské Hory a Hulváky borough, one of the 23 self-governing boroughs of Ostrava.
