= Mariánské Hory a Hulváky =

- City district of Ostrava
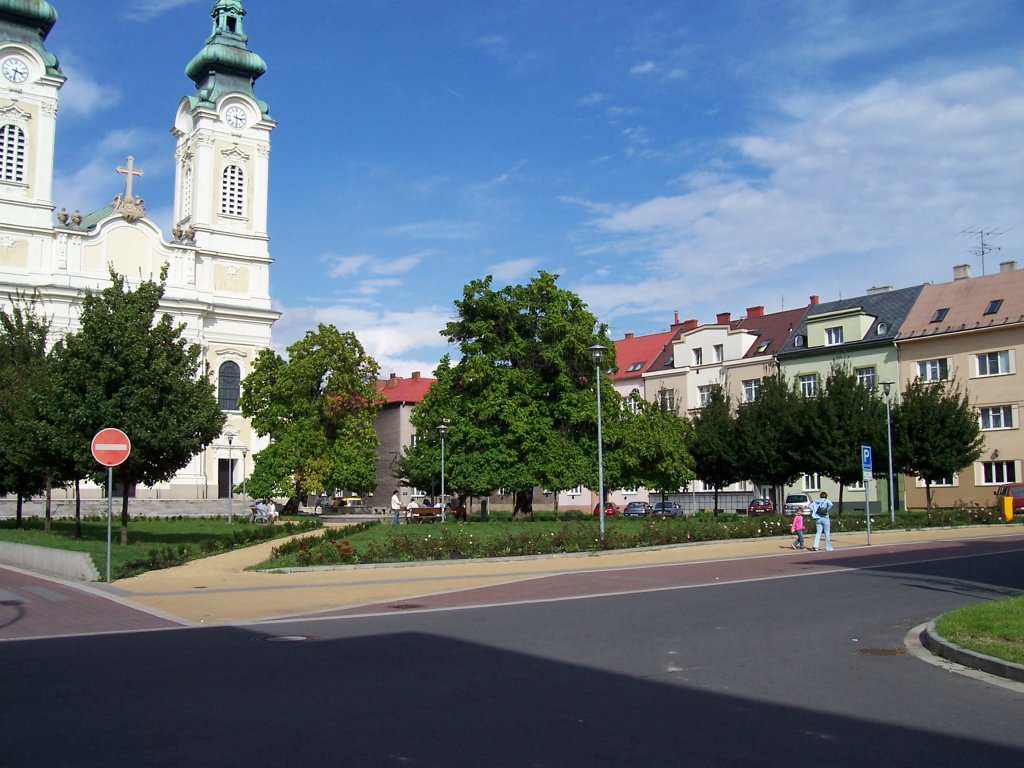
- The square Stojanovo náměstí

- Flag Coat of arms

- Location of Mariánské Hory a Hulváky in Ostrava
- Coordinates: 49°49′56″N 18°15′7″E
- Country: Czech Republic
- Region: Moravian-Silesian
- District: Ostrava-City
- City: Ostrava

Area
  - Total: 7.35 km^{2} (2.84 sq mi)

Population (2021)
  - Total: 11,629
  - Density: 1,580/km^{2} (4,100/sq mi)
- Time zone: UTC+1 (CET)
  - Summer (DST): UTC+2 (CEST)
- Postal code: 709 00
- Website: marianskehory.ostrava.cz

Mariánské Hory a Hulváky (lit. 'Mariánské Hory and Hulváky') is a city district of the city of Ostrava in the Czech Republic. Situated in the north-central part of the city, it comprises the city parts Mariánské Hory, located in the northern part of the borough, and Hulváky, located in the southern part. Both were originally separate municipalities. On 24 November 1990, it became one of the 23 self-governing boroughs of Ostrava. It has 11,629 inhabitants.

== Etymology ==
The name Mariánské Hory means literally 'Marian mountains' in modern Czech, but hory is also an archaic term for a mining area.

The name Hulváky likely derives from the German word Hohlweg, meaning 'sunken road'.

== Demographics ==
Historical population

Year	Pop.	±%
1869	428	—
1880	472	+10.3%
1890	1,154	+144.5%
1900	10,363	+798.0%
1910	14,667	+41.5%

Year	Pop.	±%
1921	12,513	−14.7%
1930	18,479	+47.7%
1950	13,555	−26.6%
1961	19,780	+45.9%
1970	14,119	−28.6%

Year	Pop.	±%
1980	16,152	+14.4%
1991	14,542	−10.0%
2001	12,998	−10.6%
2011	12,270	−5.6%
2021	11,629	−5.2%

Source: CZSO

== Gallery ==
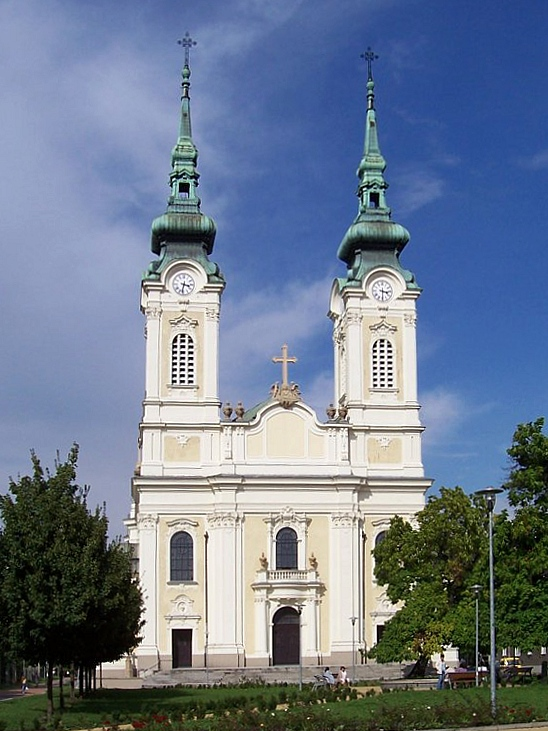
Church of Virgin Mary the Queen in Mariánské Hory

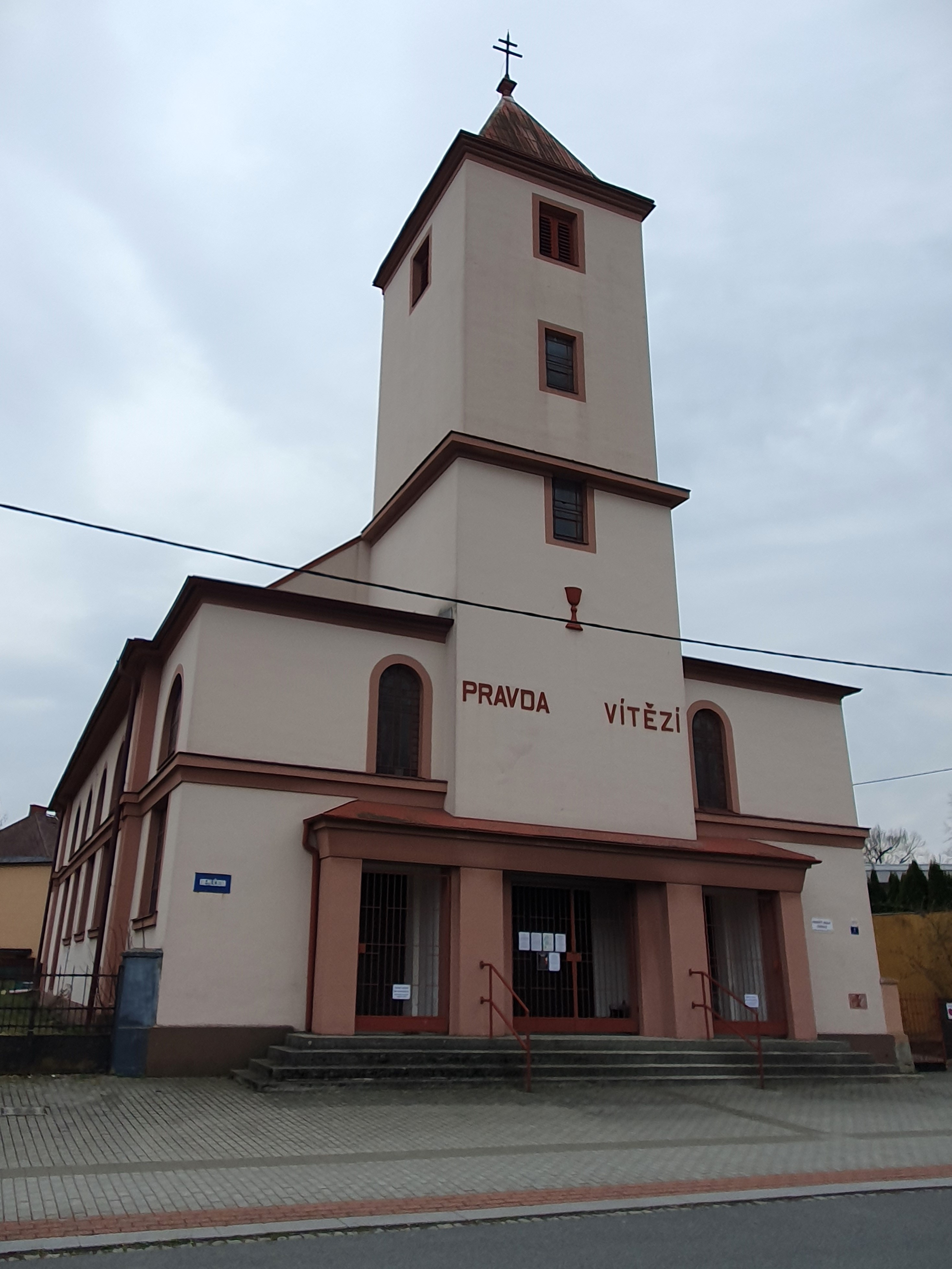
Hussite church
