= Tomáš Čermák =

Czech engineer (1943–2026)

- Born: 8 February 1943; Ostrava, Protectorate of Bohemia and Moravia
- Died: 22 May 2026 (aged 83)

Academic background
- Education: Technical University of Ostrava

Academic work
- Discipline: International economics, macroeconomics

Tomáš Čermák (8 February 1943 – 22 May 2026) was a Czech engineer and rector of Technical University of Ostrava (VŠB-TUO).

== Life and career ==
Tomáš Čermák was born in Ostrava on 8 February 1943. He graduated in 1964 from Brno University of Technology at the faculty of electrical engineering. From 1964 to 1968 he worked as an engineer for the Vitkovice Steel Company. In 1968 he became senior researcher at the VŠB – Technical University of Ostrava. In 1981 he became an assistant professor in the Department of Electrical Engineering. In 1974 he earned his Ph.D. in the field of electrical drives at the Brno University of Technology.

From 1977 to 1990 Čermák was deputy head, head and vice-dean of the Department of Electrical Machines and Drives at VŠB – TUO. In 1991 he earned a full professorship.

Čermák was rector of the Technical University of Ostrava from 1990 to 1997, and vice-rector for R&D and Foreign Affairs from 1997 to 2003. He served as the rector of VŠB – TUO since 2003.

He was a member of numerous national and international committees, such as vice-president of Czech Universities Council, Member of General Assembly of Czech Academy of Science (AVČR) and founding member of the Czech Engineering Academy (IAČR) and International Centre for Eyecare Education (ICEE). He was also consultant for the Czech government as a member of the State Committee for Scientific Degrees and Chairman of Engineering Division of Grant Agency of the Czech Republic (GAČR).

From 1997 he was the Chairman of the Board of the Vesuvius (formerly Hinckley) Slavia Group and Chairman of Supervisory at OZOBEL.

Čermák was an author of nine books and numerous articles published in journals and papers presented at national and international conferences.

Čermák died on 22 May 2026, at the age of 83.
