= VSB – Technical University of Ostrava =

Public university in Ostrava, Czech Republic

- Vysoká škola báňská
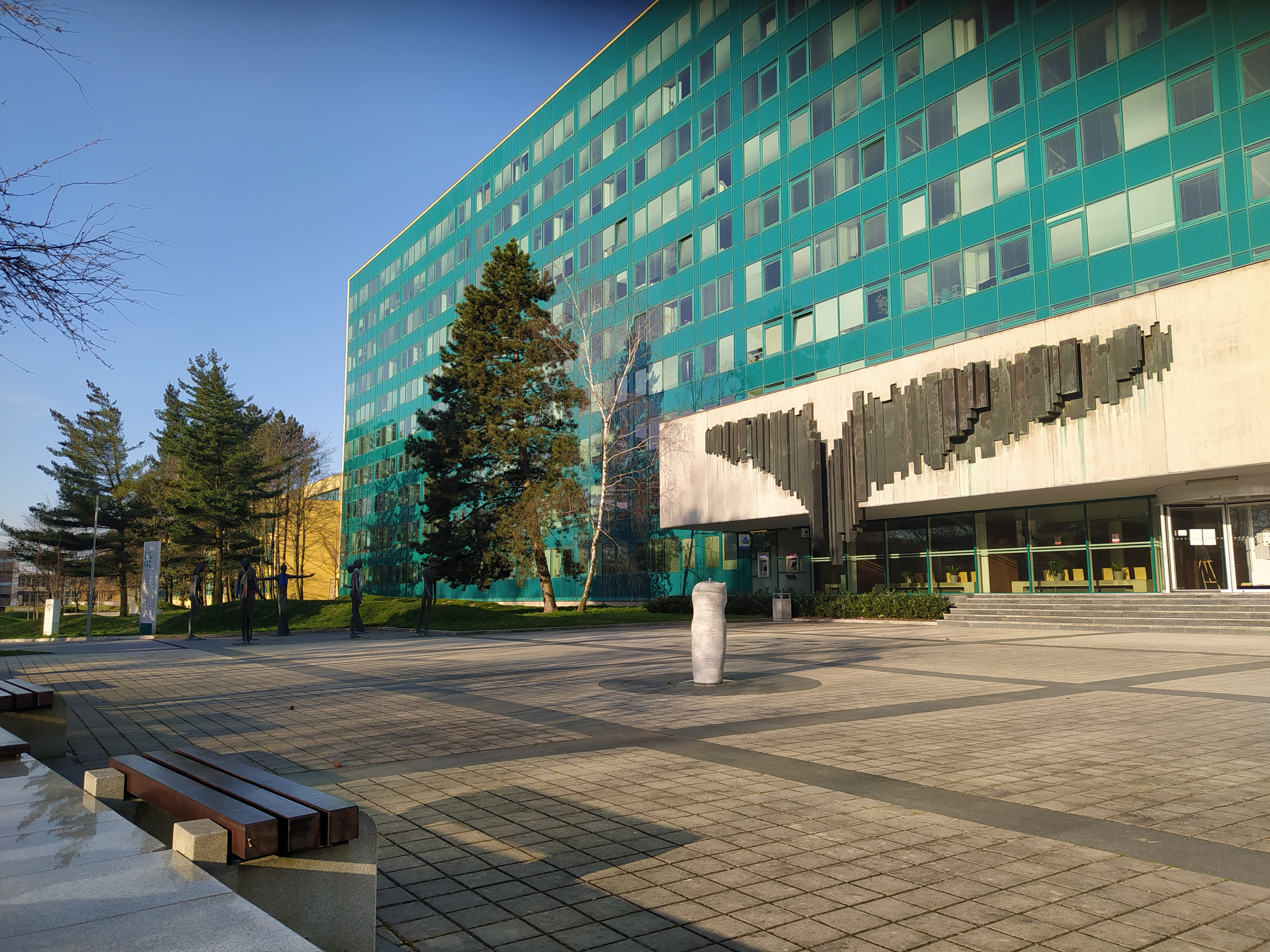
- Former name: University of Mining in Ostrava
- Type: Public
- Established: 1849 / 1904
- Rector: Václav Snášel
- Administrative staff: 1,150
- Students: 22,512
- Doctoral students: 1,740
- Location: Ostrava, Czech Republic; 49°50′0.86″N 18°9′50.44″E
- Website: www.vsb.cz/en/

University rankings

Regional – Overall
- QS Emerging Europe and Central Asia: 84 (2022)

VSB – Technical University of Ostrava (abbreviated VSB–TUO; Czech: Vysoká škola báňská – Technická univerzita Ostrava) is a university in Ostrava in the Moravian-Silesian Region of the Czech Republic. It is a polytechnic university with a long history of high-quality engineering education and research. The first Fraunhofer Innovation Platform for Applied Artificial Intelligence for Materials and Manufacturing in the Czech Republic was located at VSB - Technical University of Ostrava.

As of 2018, VSB–TUO was one of the leading Czech and European universities offering education in technology, natural sciences, and economics, producing applied and basic research and providing the necessary professional advisory, consultancy, and expert services to industry, banking, and business sectors, including lifelong learning. The graduates of the University often find jobs during their studies, with an average of 3,117 students successfully graduating each year. The University supports student activities – running their own business, studying abroad or student organisations. VSB – Technical University of Ostrava cooperates with a number of Czech and foreign universities and companies.

== History ==
=== Founding ===
The school was founded in the middle of the 19th century when long-standing efforts to establish a vocational school to train mining professionals culminated. The Mining Vocational School in Příbram (Montan-Lehranstalt in Příbram) was established by imperial decree on 23 January 1849, and the first year of study was inaugurated on 10 November of the same year. From the time of its foundation, the school offered two courses, one for mining and the other for metallurgy. In 1865, the school adopted the name of the Mining Academy in Příbram (Bergakademie in Příbram). Although private mining companies undervalued higher education in mining, its importance was emphasised by the increasing frequency of mining disasters. According to the statutes of 1895, the Rector, elected by the professorial staff members, was responsible for the management of the mining academy, as in other universities. The professors of the Mining Academy in Příbram were thus placed on an equal footing with the professors of the technical colleges. Still, it was not until 1904 that the Mining Academy in Leoben and Příbram was upgraded to a fully-fledged university under a new statute, which was common to the mining academies in Leoben and Příbram. The new legislation also changed the name of the Mining Academy in Příbram to the Mining University in Příbram (Montanistische Hochschule in Příbram).

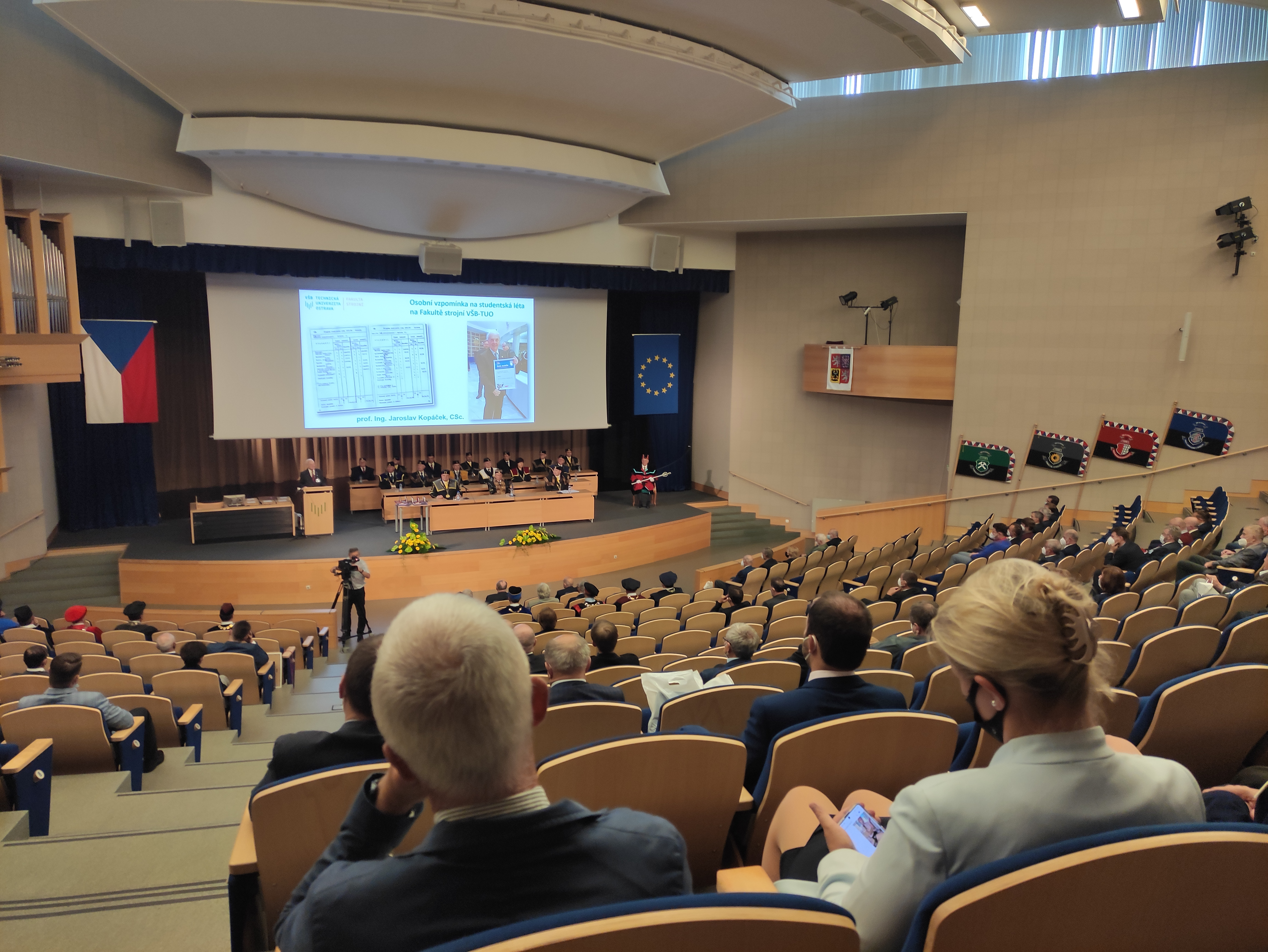
Celebrations of the 70s of the Faculty of Mechanical Engineering

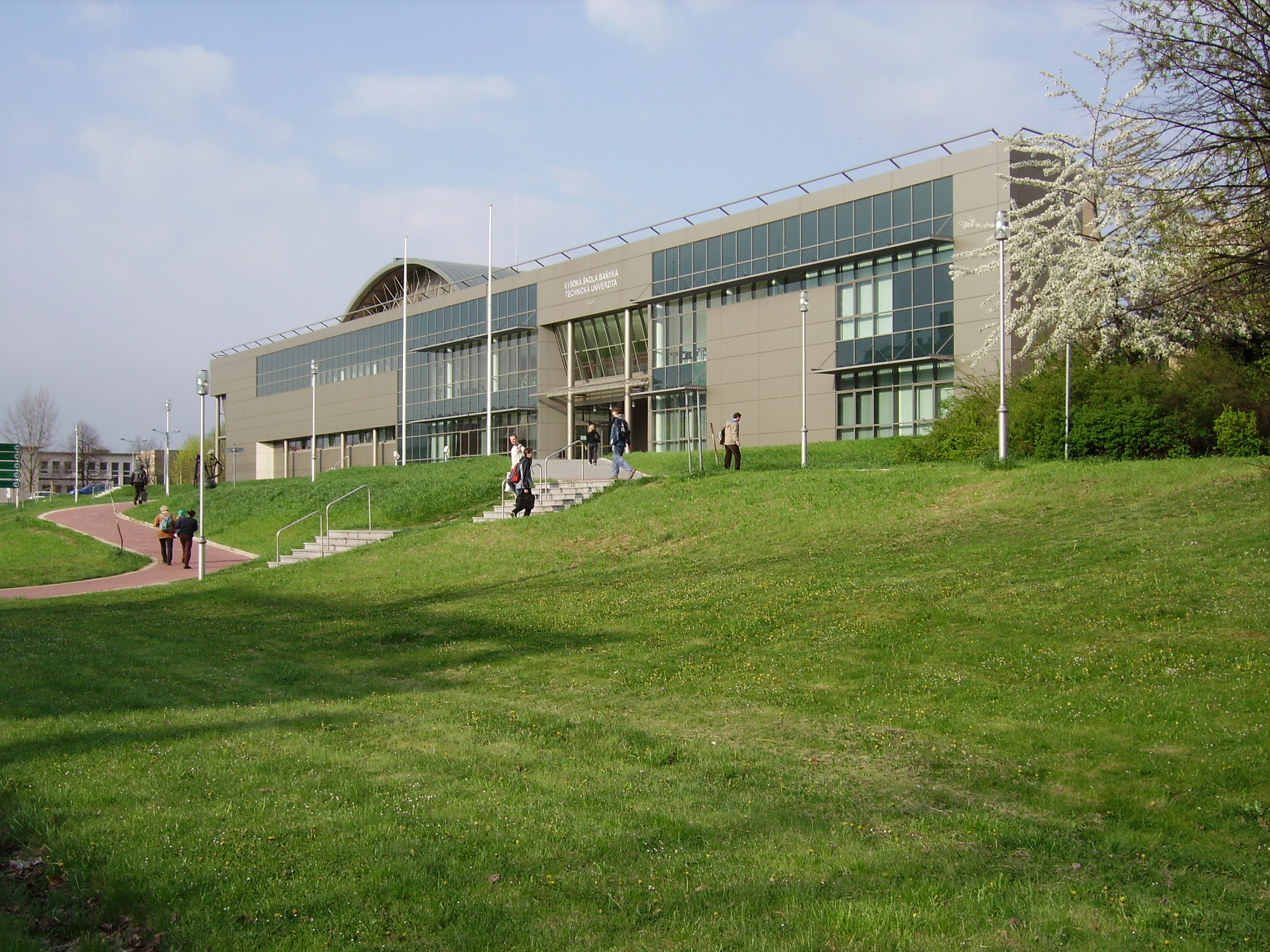
Auditorium

The declaration of independent Czechoslovakia in 1918 and the introduction of the Czech language of instruction a year later were important milestones for the further development of the University. Among the most important issues that all rectors dealt with in the interwar period was the demand for the transfer of VSB from Příbram as an independent university to Prague, which did not happen during the entire First Republic period. Nevertheless, during this period, VSB in Příbram gained an important position in the system of higher technical education and made a significant contribution to the development of scientific knowledge in the traditional mining disciplines and the fields of mechanical engineering, electrical engineering, and natural sciences. The closure of the Czech universities in November 1939 marked the end of VSB's Příbram period, just as it was preparing to celebrate its 90th anniversary.

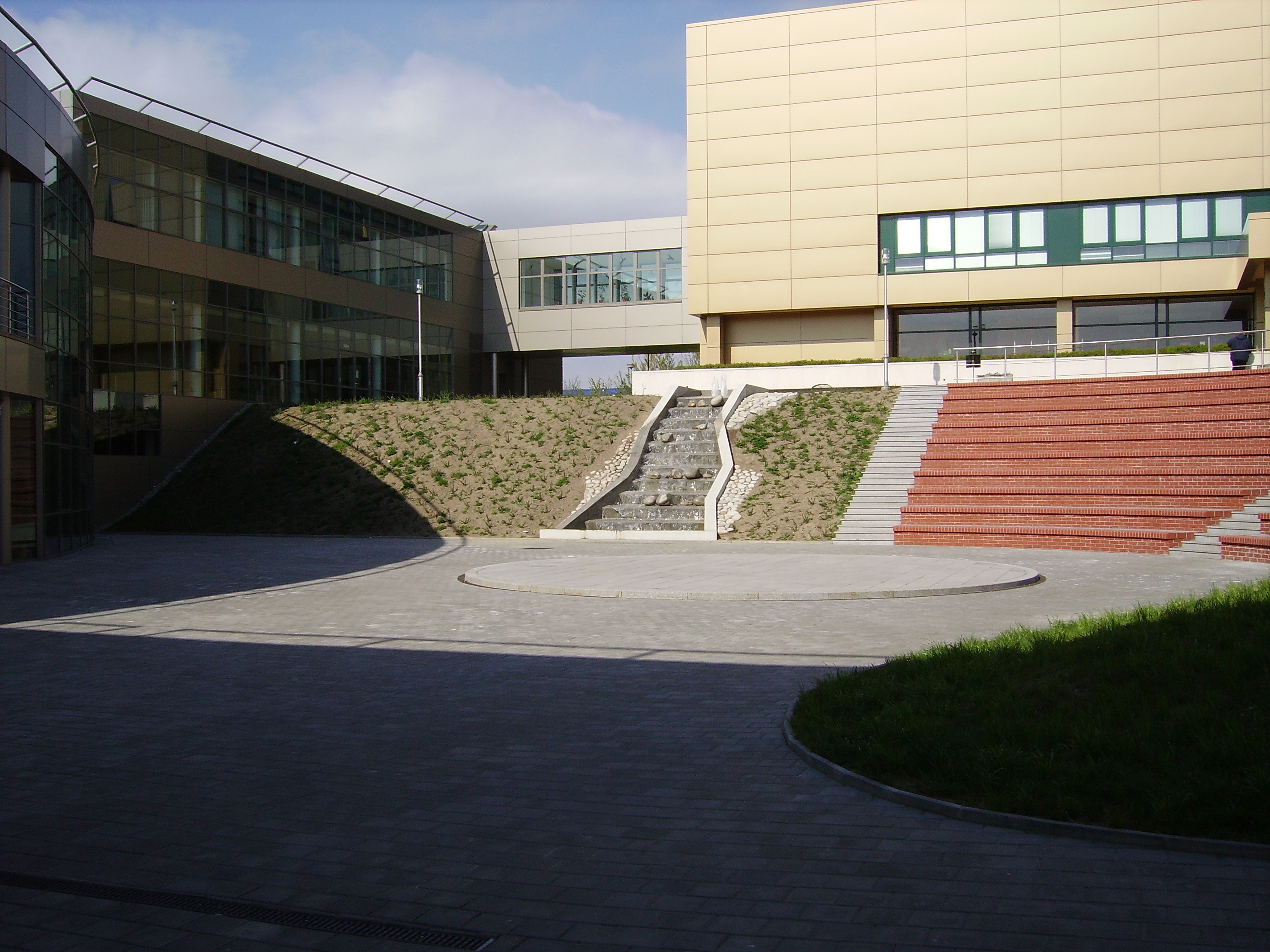
Courtyard

After the liberation of Czechoslovakia in 1945, VSB in Příbram resumed its activities in May, but based on the decree of the President of the Republic Edvard Beneš of 8 September 1945, it was transferred from Příbram to Ostrava. The teaching of the winter semester of the academic year 1945/1946 started in Ostrava in November 1945. The further development of VSB in Ostrava and the whole Czechoslovak higher education system was influenced by the issue of the new Higher Education Act in 1950. The new act represented a fundamental change in the existing structure of the higher education system. In effect, it subordinated higher education institutions to state supervision and effectively abolished academic freedoms. The new legal regulation of 1950 also fundamentally changed the internal structure of VSB in Ostrava. From the academic year 1951/1952, the Faculties of Mining and Metallurgy were established. The Faculty of Mining Engineering (since 1968, the Faculty of Mechanical Engineering) was established at VSB by incorporating the College of Engineering in Brušperk. In 1953, two more faculties were established, the Faculty of Economics and Engineering (abolished in 1959) and the Faculty of Geology (merged with the Faculty of Mining in 1959). From the 1950s onwards, new fields of study and specialisations were gradually established in response to the demands of industrial practice, triggered by significant developments in the traditional mining disciplines and mechanical and electrical engineering. An important moment in the development of the University was the start of its activities in the newly built premises in Ostrava-Poruba in 1973. VSB in Ostrava gradually transformed from a traditional mining university into a polytechnic university, which was facilitated by the development of disciplines and fields of study that increasingly used computer technology. The development of economic disciplines at VSB Ostrava resulted in the establishment of the Faculty of Economics in 1977. In the same year, the Faculty of Mechanical Engineering was renamed the Faculty of Mechanical and Electrical Engineering, which was the culmination of many years of development and gradual profiling of the faculty’s scientific and pedagogical activities in the field of electrical engineering.

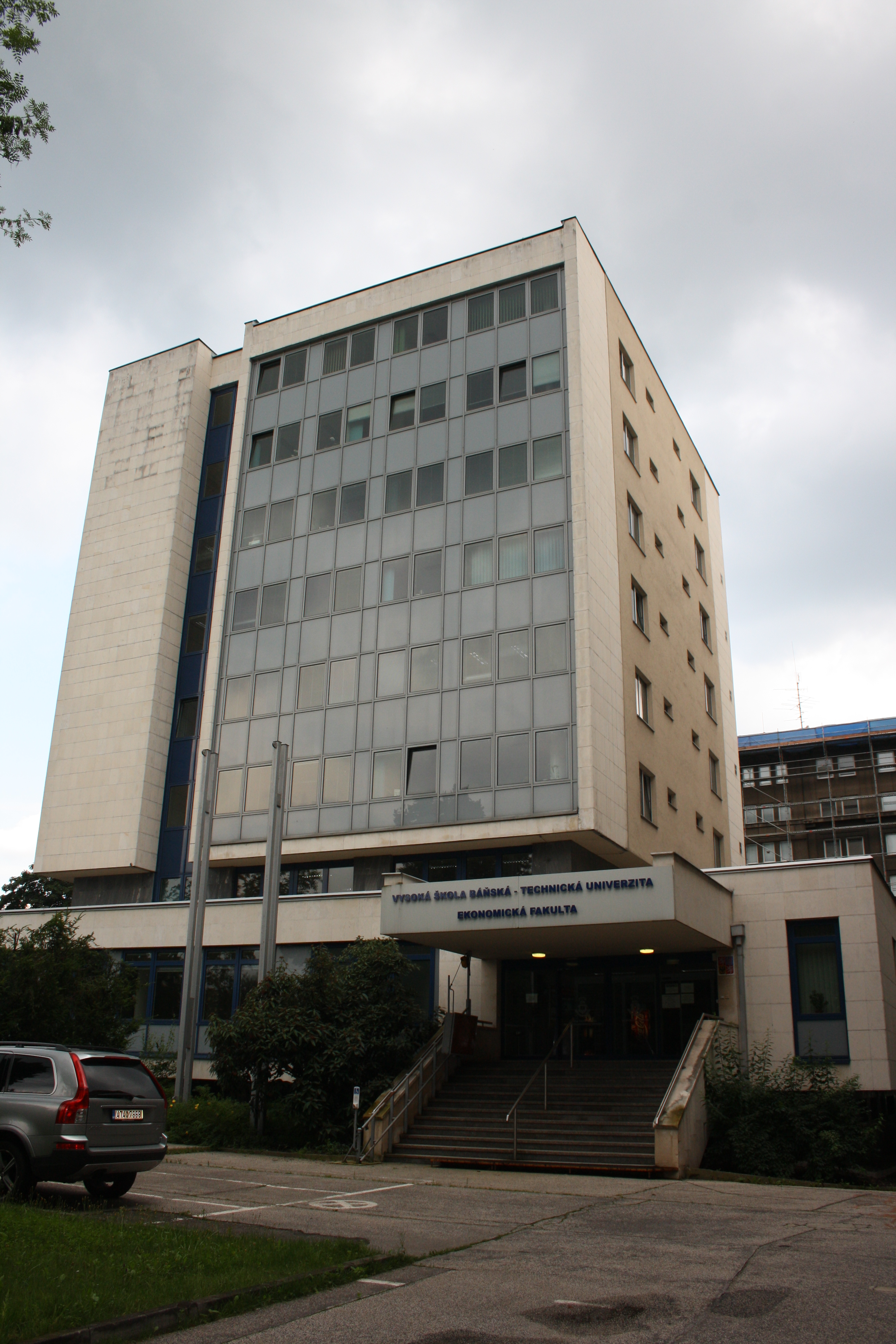
Faculty of Economics

The society-wide events of November 1989 and the subsequent political developments marked a return to autonomy and academic freedoms for Czechoslovak higher education. In the first half of the 1990s, VSB in Ostrava underwent an extensive transformation. The change in study fields was triggered by the restructuring of the metallurgical industries and the downsizing programme in the mining sector. While preserving the traditional fields of study in which VSB Ostrava had maintained an exclusive position for decades, it was necessary to focus on other fields using new technologies and materials. The faculties thus had to respond to the current needs of the labour market in the content of individual degree programmes. A positive consequence of the revolutionary events was the opening of the borders, which enabled the establishment of contacts and contracts with foreign universities and research institutes and the involvement of the University in international scientific research programmes. The transformation of VSB into a polytechnic university was completed with the establishment of the independent Faculty of Electrical Engineering in 1991 and its name extension to the Faculty of Electrical Engineering and Computer Science in 1993. The change of the traditional name of the Faculty of Metallurgy to the Faculty of Metallurgy and Materials Engineering in 1991 was related to its new concept and the focus of its research and teaching activities in the field of materials science.

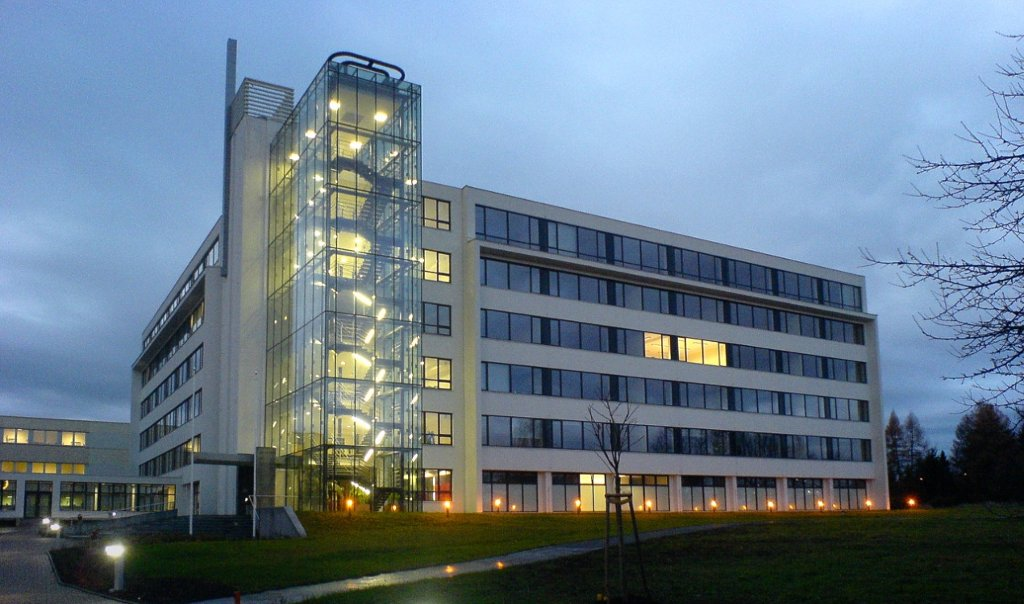
Faculty of Civil Engineering

=== Modern period ===
In 1994, the traditional historical name of the university was changed to VSB – Technical University of Ostrava. The long tradition of teaching in civil engineering and geotechnics became the basis for establishing the independent Faculty of Civil Engineering in 1997. More than thirty years of development in the field of fire prevention technology and industrial safety, together with the demands of practice for the preparation of university-educated professionals in the field of safety engineering, led to the establishment of the Faculty of Safety Engineering in 2002. With the establishment of other specialised workplaces, quality facilities corresponding to their needs were built within the University campus in Ostrava-Poruba. The Energy Research Centre, the Nanotechnology Centre, the University institute ENET (Energy Units for Utilisation of Non-Traditional Energy Sources), and now the Centre for Energy and Environmental Technologies have been developing their successful research activities here. Based on long-standing research and development activities in the field of information technologies, the National Supercomputing Centre IT4Innovations was established in 2015. It currently operates two supercomputers: Barbora (commissioned in autumn 2019) and Karolina (ranked as the 112th most powerful supercomputer in the world in 2024), as well as a dedicated system for artificial intelligence computing, NVIDIA DGX-2 (launched in spring 2019).

In 2021, the construction of a new building of the Faculty of Economics and the construction of the Centre for Energy and Environmental Technologies started within the VSB–TUO campus.

== Faculties ==
- Faculty of Mining and Geology (Czech: Hornicko-geologická fakulta – HGF): 1716
- Faculty of Materials Science and Technology (Czech: Fakulta materiálově-technologická – FMT): 1849
- Faculty of Mechanical Engineering (Czech: Fakulta strojní – FS): 1950
- Faculty of Economics (Czech: Ekonomická fakulta – EKF): 1977
- Faculty of Electrical Engineering and Computer Science (Czech: Fakulta elektrotechniky a informatiky – FEI): 1991
- Faculty of Civil Engineering (Czech: Fakulta stavební – FAST): 1997
- Faculty of Safety Engineering (Czech: Fakulta bezpečnostního inženýrství – FBI): 2002

== Research, innovations and discoveries ==
Strategic research areas:

- IT
- Power engineering
- Material sciences
- Environmental Engineering

Partial research and development directions:

- Engineering and technology: electrical engineering, mechanical engineering, materials science and engineering, civil engineering, safety engineering, biomedical and biomechanical engineering, environmental protection and brownfield management, chemical engineering, geological engineering, geodesy and geoinformatics, automotive and transport engineering, acoustic engineering, nanotechnologies, additive technologies.
- Computer science and cyber-physical systems: artificial intelligence, machine learning, computer vision and image processing, software and process engineering, high-performance computing, high-performance data analysis, computational and applied mathematics, Industry 4.0, robotics.
- Power engineering and raw materials: renewable energy, energy storage, high-capacity energy storage systems, energy management using artificial intelligence methods, energy diagnostics, electromobility, processing of energy raw materials.
- Economic and financial processes: economics, finance, management science, business administration.

Students from the VSB - Technical University of Ostrava's Faculty of Mechanical Engineering presented the new formula model. The Formula team members have spent their time preparing for an international competition in the Czech Republic and abroad. Vector 07 is the name of the new student formula.

== Notable alumni ==
- Karel Heyrowský (1802–1863), Professor of mining, mining machinery and mining measurements 1849–1863
- Josef Theurer (1862–1928), Professor of mathematics and physics 1895–1926, first chancellor of Vysoká škola báňská in Příbram (1904), and rector 1903–1927
- František Mařík (1884–1966), Professor of winding equipment
- František Čechura (1887–1974), Professor of mining measurements, rector 1945–1950
- Alois Řiman (1896–1966), Founder of mine planning
- Richard Doležal (1921–2005), Professor of process engineering at TU Ostrava, CTU Prag, Braunschweig University of Technology, University of Stuttgart
- Tomáš Čermák (1943–2026), engineer and rector 1990-1997 and 2003-2010
- Václav Roubíček (born 1944), Professor of fire engineering at TUO, rector 1997 to 2003; former member of the Senate of the Czech Republic
