= Ostravak =

Political movement in Ostrava, Czech Republic

Ostravak Citizens' Movement Ostravak hnutí občanů
- Chairman: Tomáš Málek
- 1st Vice Chairwoman: Eva Schwarzová
- Registered: 29 July 2010 (#71443215)
- Headquarters: Brandlova 1267/6, Ostrava, 702 00
- Ideology: Ostrava regionalism
- Political position: Big tent
- Colours: Red
- Senate: 0 / 81
- Municipal councils: 47 / 62,300

Website
- ostravak.cz

Ostravak is a regional political movement in Ostrava, Czech Republic, formed ahead of the 2010 Czech municipal elections from the civic association "We Live in the City - Our Ostrava". The movement only participates in municipal and Senate elections, and has no national affiliation or ambitions to nationwide political participation.

== History ==
The Ostravak movement emerged ahead of the 2010 municipal elections, with the goal of disrupting the existing grand coalition of the Czech Social Democratic Party (ČSSD) and the Civic Democratic Party (ODS), which they argued did not respect the interests of the city's citizens. According to the movement itself, it was formed in response to "clientelism, arrogance of power, unprofessionalism, disrespect for the law, inefficient and uneconomical use of Ostrava property".

== Elections ==
Ostravak ran in the 2010 municipal elections in the city of Ostrava, winning 10 seats, and in Moravian Ostrava and Přívoz, winning 10 seats and finishing ahead of ODS (8 seats) and ČSSD (9 seats).

In the 2012 Senate election, Ostravak's candidate Leopold Sulovský was elected in the Ostrava-město district. In the 2018, Sulovský defended his seat with 59.89% of the vote.

== Electoral results ==
Year	Votes		Mandates	
Year	abs.	%	abs.	%
2010	774,985	0.86	20	0.03
2014	797,271	6.73	55	1.31
2026	612,873	0.55	48	0.08

== Party funding ==
Since its formation, Ostravak has received donations from citizens totalling CZK 3,604,700. According to Marek Stoniš of Reflex, Ostravak serves to promote the interests of businessman Lukáš Semerák, chairman of the board and co-owner of the real estate company S.P.I. Holdings, which is the largest donor to the movement.
